= Letchworth-Love Mounds Archaeological State Park =

State park in Florida, United States

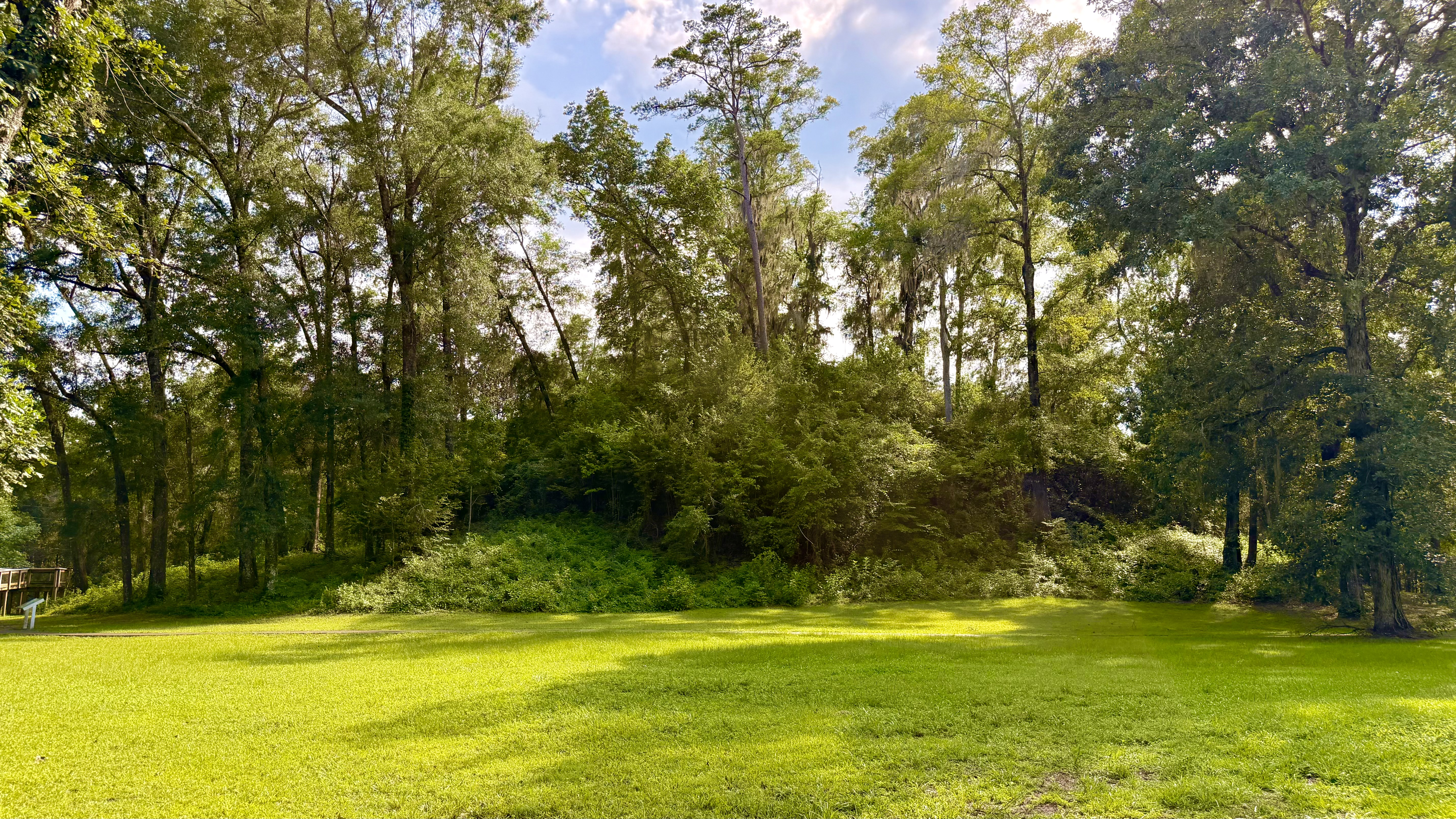
- Mound 1, the tallest prehistoric earthwork in Florida

- Location within Florida Location within the United States
- Interactive map of Letchworth-Love Mounds Archaeological State Park
- Location: Jefferson County, Florida, US
- Nearest city: Monticello, Florida
- Coordinates: 30°31′04″N 83°59′30″W
- Area: 190.11 acres (76.93 ha)
- Established: June 30, 1992; 34 years ago
- Governing body: Florida Department of Environmental Protection
- Letchworth Mounds Archaeological Site
- U.S. National Register of Historic Places
- NRHP reference No.: 10001034
- Added to NRHP: 15 December 2010

Letchworth-Love Mounds Archaeological State Park is a 190.11-acre (76.93 ha) Florida state park in Jefferson County, Florida, United States, about six miles (9.7 km) west of Monticello. It preserves the Letchworth-Love Mounds, a Woodland period mound complex on a low sandy rise near the southwestern shore of Lake Miccosukee. The site is recorded in the Florida Master Site File, the state's inventory of historical and archaeological resources, under the Smithsonian trinomial 8JE337. Its principal earthwork, Mound 1, stands about 49 feet (15 m) tall and is the tallest prehistoric Native American earthwork in Florida. The site was added to the National Register of Historic Places in 2010.

The complex was built and occupied chiefly by the Swift Creek and Weeden Island cultures between roughly AD 200 and 900, with most mound construction falling in the early Weeden Island period. At least seven mounds survive within the park, set around a central plaza with an adjoining habitation area; historical accounts describe as many as 28 mounds across the wider site. Excavations in the habitation area have uncovered a Woodland-period house whose radiocarbon dates place it in the fifth or sixth century AD. Lying near the geographic center of the Weeden Island culture area, Letchworth is distinctive among the culture's major ceremonial centers, most of which stand at its margins.

The mound was described in print as early as 1931 and noted in 1939 by the historian Mark F. Boyd, who called it the "Miccosukee mound"; even so, the land remained in private, largely agricultural ownership and was not recorded as an archaeological site until 1975. The state assembled the park through purchases in 1992 and 2005, and it is managed by the Florida Department of Environmental Protection (FDEP) Division of Recreation and Parks.

Beyond the mounds, the park protects a mosaic of upland woodland and wetland communities in the Tallahassee Hills that shelter several rare and imperiled species, and it lies within the Florida Wildlife Corridor. It is open for hiking, birding, picnicking, and wildlife viewing, with an interpretive pavilion and an elevated platform overlooking Mound 1.

== Name ==
The park is named for the Letchworth-Love Mounds (8JE337), the archaeological site it protects. (Note: The park was known as "Letchworth Mounds Archaeological State Park" through at least 2003; the addition of "Love" to the name postdates the state's August 2005 acquisition of a second parcel from Hurley H. Booth, though the specific origin of the "Love" element is not addressed in the sources cited here.) The "Letchworth" part of the name comes from Larry R. and Rosa C. Letchworth, the former private owners of the land on which the principal mound sits. The state bought the land from them in 1992 as part of the P-2000 and CARL land-conservation programs. Earlier writers referred to the principal earthwork by other names: the historian Mark F. Boyd called it the "Miccosukee mound" in 1939, and the archaeologist Hale G. Smith the "Lake Miccosukee Mound" in 1951. In archaeological literature the site is also called "Letchworth Mounds" or simply "Letchworth".

== History ==
=== Discovery and early documentation ===
The earliest known publication of the site comes from June 1931, when an article in the Tallahassee Daily Democrat by Bob Evans described Mound 1 as the largest known Indian mound in Florida. Evans reported that members of the Tallahassee post of the American Legion were working to preserve the mound, and noted that four excavation pits had already been dug into its top. The following year, on January 21, 1932, members of the Florida Geological Survey visited the mound; a photograph taken during that visit shows W. F. Yarborough at its base and J. Clarence Simpson at its summit, and is now preserved in the Florida State Archives. In a 1939 article on Spanish mission sites, the historian Mark F. Boyd listed a pyramidal earthwork he called the "Miccosukee mound", about half a mile west of Lake Miccosukee and south of U.S. Highway 90, and observed that it "may actually lie in Jefferson county".

Despite this early attention, the land stayed under private ownership and the site was not recorded until April 1975, when Jeanne Fryman noted that six of the eight smaller mounds had been disturbed by farming, and landowners told her of 10 to 20 additional mounds in the woods toward Lloyd Creek. By then much of the property had seen agricultural and forestry use, including cattle grazing behind wire fencing; plowing had cut into the largest mound, and one of the smaller mounds had been destroyed during the 1970s.

=== State acquisition ===
On June 30, 1992, the Board of Trustees of the Internal Improvement Trust Fund bought a tract of about 81 acres (33 ha) from Larry R. and Rosa C. Letchworth, drawing on the P-2000 and Florida Conservation and Recreation Lands (CARL) programs. (Note: The Division of Recreation and Parks' 2026 jurisdiction report gives the acquisition date as June 20, 1992; the date used here is from the state's acquisition record and Landrum's history of the park system.) The tract was leased to the Florida Department of Environmental Protection (FDEP), Division of Recreation and Parks, for management on October 21, 1996. A second purchase of about 109 acres (44 ha) from Hurley H. Booth on August 29, 2005, enlarged the park to its present 190.11 acres (76.93 ha). (Note: Landrum's 2013 history of the park system and the 2019 management plan both give the park's size as 188.20 acres; the current figure is from the Division of Recreation and Parks' 2026 jurisdiction report, which is based on GIS mapping.)

== Archaeology ==
=== The mound complex ===
Within the state park, the site extends across roughly 114 acres (46 ha) and contains at least seven surviving mounds, together with a plaza, a former habitation area, and a pond, which may originally have been a borrow pit dug to supply earth for mound construction. A 1997 letter from the archaeologist Calvin Jones placed the overall total at 28 mounds in and around the site, about a dozen of them on private land to the south and east.

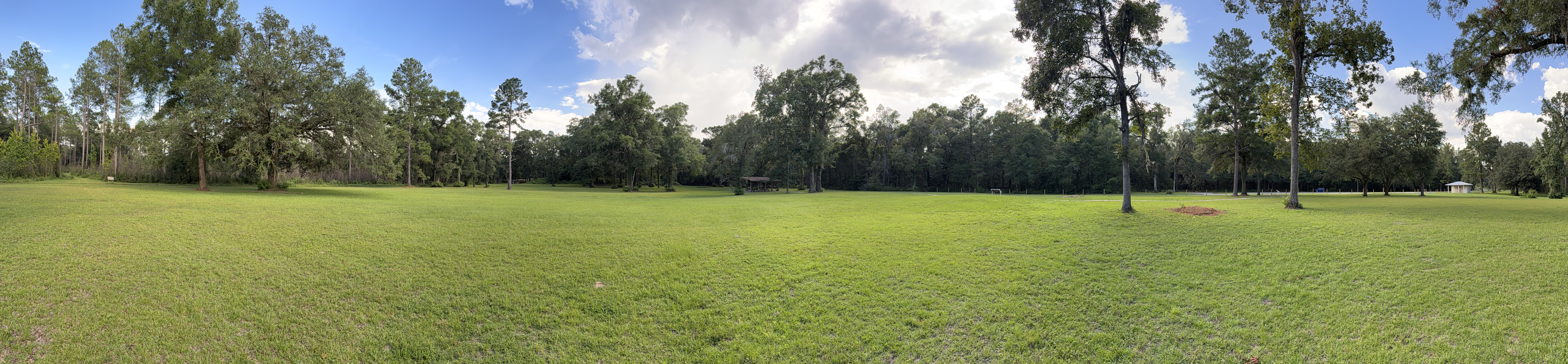
The mound complex plaza; Mound 1 lies in the treeline at left and Mound 3 at right.

=== Individual mounds ===
The 2019 unit management plan documents seven standing mounds within the state park, numbered 1 through 7, along with related mound components outside the current park boundary that have been recorded historically or destroyed before state acquisition.

Standing mounds at Letchworth-Love Mounds (8JE337)
Mound	Shape	Dimensions	Function	Condition
1	Truncated pyramid with ramp, aprons, and platform	49 ft (15 m) tall	Ceremonial	Fair
2	Rectangular	~66 ft (20 m) × 25 m (82 ft), less than 3.3 ft (1 m) tall	Possible residential platform	Good
3	Conical	~33 ft (10 m) diameter, less than 3.3 ft (1 m) tall	Not specified	Fair
4	Oval	~33 ft (10 m) diameter, less than 3.3 ft (1 m) tall	Not specified	Good
5	Oval	160 ft (50 m) diameter, 6.6 ft (2 m) tall	Not specified	Fair
6	Oval	200 ft (60 m) diameter, 4.9 ft (1.5 m) tall	Mortuary	Fair
7	Low sand mound	Not specified	Not specified	Good
Source: FDEP 2019, pp. 32–33. Condition uses the FDEP Good/Fair/Poor scale.

Mound 1, the principal earthwork, is a flat-topped pyramidal mound of the kind archaeologists call a platform mound: a ramp climbs its northern side, low apron-like extensions flank it to the east and west, and a broad platform projects to the south. Standing about 49 feet (15 m) high, it is the tallest prehistoric earthwork in Florida. Radiocarbon evidence indicates that it was raised in three stages, beginning after the late third or early fourth century AD. In 1951 Smith observed that it stood about ten feet higher than the largest mound at Lake Jackson.

Mound 2, in front of the former Letchworth house, is a low mound of roughly rectangular outline whose form has been read as a base that once carried dwellings. Mound 3 appeared only as a symbol marked "Indian mounds possible mounds" on Jones's 1987 sketch map and was not accurately mapped until the 2002–03 survey, when it was located close to the present parking area and pavilion; clearing under private ownership had reshaped its outer slope. Mound 4, a small oval feature little touched by modern activity, was noticed by Louis Tesar during the 2002–03 survey as vegetation was cleared along the south edge of Mound 1. Mound 5, the tallest of the low mounds and oval in plan, has been disturbed by agricultural plowing. Mound 6, also oval, is interpreted in the management plan as a burial mound and has likewise been affected by farming and silviculture. Mound 7, immediately east of Mound 6, is the most recent discovery; the University of South Florida located it through archaeological sensitivity modeling after a prescribed burn removed the dense shrub layer, and no artifacts were visible on the surface when it was recorded.

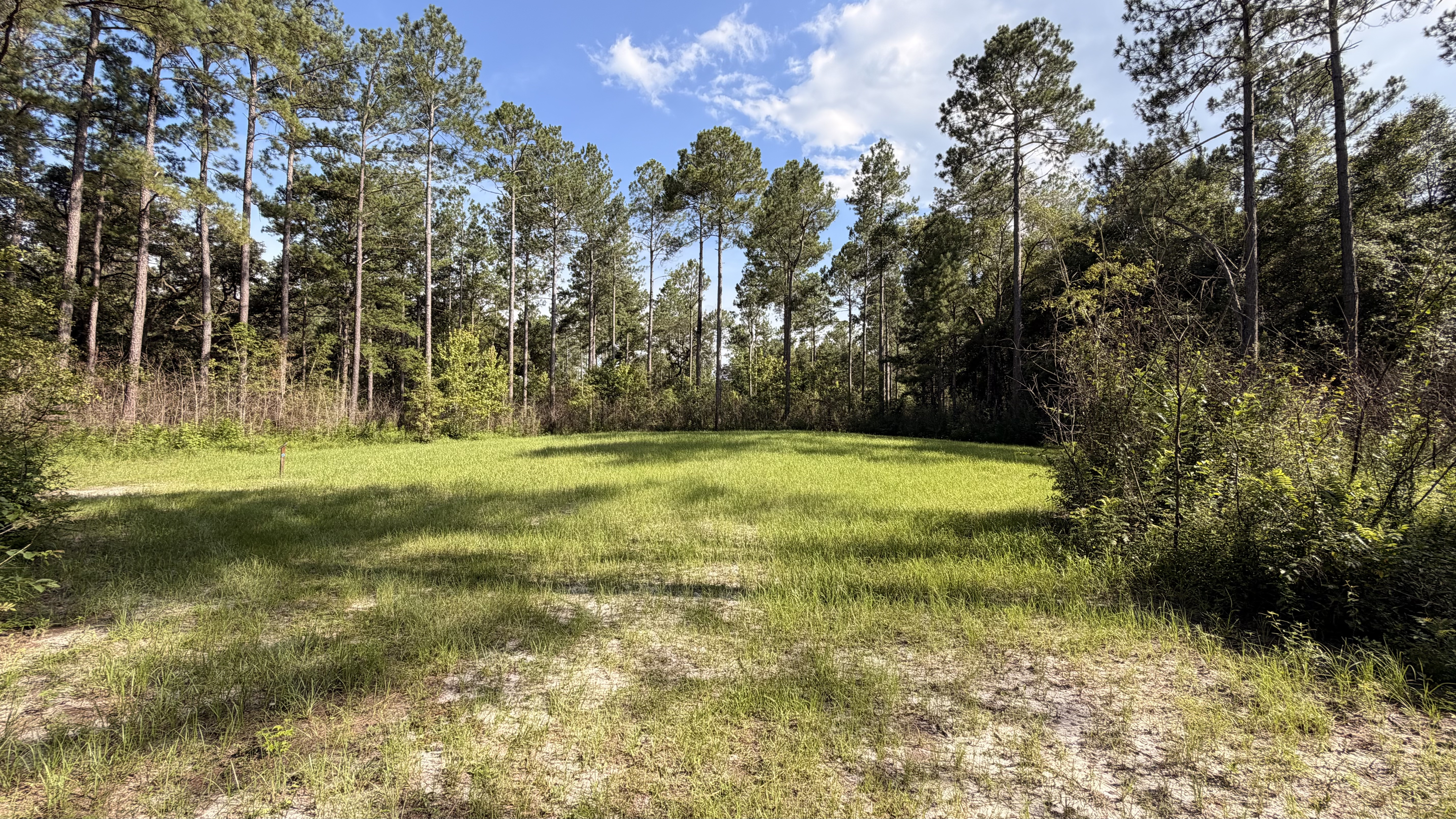
Mound 6 at Letchworth-Love Mounds in the afternoon.

Other mounds once tied to the complex either lie beyond the modern park or no longer exist. The Sun Ray Road Mound (8JE133), recorded in 1972 by the archaeologist James J. Miller, was a small conical burial mound of yellow sand, about 5 feet (1.5 m) high and 50 feet (15 m) across, just east of the original Letchworth tract; it was destroyed during land leveling in the 1980s.

Jones's 1987 sketch map also placed three mounds on what is now state land, allegedly where the landowner recalled them being located since by this point, they had already been destroyed by land clearing. The 2002–03 survey team designated these locations CJ-A, CJ-B and CJ-C, to be numbered only if confirmed, and found no mound remains at any of them.

=== Chronology and cultural affiliation ===
Artifacts from the site suggest that humans used the area at least intermittently for as long as 10,000 years, though the majority date to the Weeden Island period. A 2003 survey of the southern portion of the park, which mapped its topography and sampled buried soil through systematic auger testing (boring small test holes into the ground), suggested from indirect evidence gathered outside the mounds that they were most likely built during the earlier phases of the Weeden Island period (AD 200–900); the recovered assemblage is detailed below (see § Artifacts).

Located near the geographic center of the Weeden Island cultural area, Letchworth is distinctive among the culture's known ceremonial centers. Other major Weeden Island ceremonial centers include the McKeithen site in Columbia County, Florida and Kolomoki in Early County, Georgia, along with, possibly, Crystal River; all lie at the peripheries of the cultural area rather than at its center.

=== Domestic architecture ===
During the 2019–2020 field season, excavations directed by University of Michigan archaeologist Martin Menz uncovered a Woodland-period residential structure at the site. This structure is a significant find, as it is one of only a handful of such structures identified in the Gulf Coastal Plain. Most of its postholes were about 3.9 inches (10 cm) across, indicating a frame of narrow, bent ("flexed") poles rather than rigid upright posts. The building measured approximately 14 feet (4.3 m) in diameter and enclosed about 156 square feet (14.5 m^{2}) of interior space, with a central hearth and six interior storage pits. Radiocarbon dates on features in the structure cluster around cal AD 420–637, placing residential use at the site in the fifth and sixth centuries AD. Of the Woodland-period houses Menz compared from ceremonial centers in the region, the Letchworth structure is the only one built with flexed poles, which Menz associates with lower labor investment, shorter-term occupation, and greater mobility.

=== Artifacts ===
Artifacts were recovered throughout the survey area during the 2003 survey. Stone (lithic) artifacts accounted for approximately 79 percent of the total assemblage, ceramics for 16 percent, and a smaller quantity of clay, animal bone, and other material for the remainder. No historic-period artifacts were recovered during the survey. Fewer than six percent of the recovered artifacts were diagnostic, meaning distinctive enough in style to be assigned to a particular period or culture. Of those, about 77 percent dated to the Weeden Island period and 14 percent to the Deptford period, while the Fort Walton period was represented by only two plain body sherds. Across all diagnostic artifacts noted at the site, the report gives 96 percent (1,340 pieces) as Weeden Island, 3 percent (35) as Deptford, and 1 percent (19) as Fort Walton.

The stone collection includes material from every stage of stone-tool manufacture: cores, flakes struck from the weathered outer surface of the stone, and blocky waste fragments; broken blanks, preforms (partly shaped tools), and flakes removed while thinning tools; and simple, quickly made tools such as knives, shavers, and abraders, along with a smaller number of finished tools. A concentration of stone artifacts near a swampy area in the southwest corner of the survey area suggests that a chert quarry source may lie nearby, although no chert was seen exposed at the surface and auger testing encountered no limestone. Only two artifacts were identified as possible Paleoindian or Early Archaic pieces: a partly finished tool worked on both faces, made of translucent chert with a heavy weathered surface (patina), and the working end of a scraper worked on one face only. Middle Archaic material is largely limited to a few simple flake tools and the tip of a projectile point resembling the Newnan or Hillsborough types.

Swift Creek Stamped sherds recovered from Russell Cave National Monument in Alabama

Ceramic assemblages include several characteristic Weeden Island wares, including Franklin Plain, Swift Creek Complicated Stamped, Wakulla Check Stamped, and Carrabelle Punctated types. Three concentrations of ceramics were identified during auger testing, in the middle-southwestern, southeastern, and northeastern portions of the survey area. A single sand-tempered Chattahoochee Brushed body sherd, identified as a possible Seminole-period vessel fragment, was recovered from an auger unit was recovered from one of the auger units. The domestic collection from the Woodland-period house at Block 1 is described as dominated by utilitarian ceramics and everyday tools.

All artifacts and field notes from the 2003 survey are curated by the Florida Bureau of Archaeological Research (BAR) in Tallahassee under Accession Number 03.02. The park itself does not maintain collections of archaeological artifacts or materials.

=== Relationship to nearby sites ===
In their 2003 survey report, Tesar and colleagues suggested that the Letchworth mounds were most likely built between about AD 200 and 900, at least two centuries before Middle Mississippian-period Fort Walton culture mound construction began at the nearby Lake Jackson site. They also noted that Letchworth's early Weeden Island artifacts resemble those from Kolomoki in Georgia, and suggested that the complex could be another regional mound center linked to Kolomoki and the McKeithen site, a possibility they considered worth further investigation.

== Geology and climate ==
=== Physiography ===
The Letchworth-Love Mounds lie in the Tallahassee Hills of northern Florida, a region of hills and ridges standing up to about 260 feet (79 m). The hills are remnants left behind by erosion, capped by the Miccosukee Formation, a layer of sand, silt, and clay (clastic sediment) laid down late in the Miocene epoch. Deeply cut by streams and by the slow dissolving (solution) of the rock beneath them, the Hills are interpreted as the eroded remains of an originally near-level delta plain that once extended across northern Jefferson County; they are broken today by scattered lakes, streams, and narrow valleys, among them Lake Miccosukee in the western part of the county. To the south the Hills end at the Cody Scarp, a south-facing escarpment separating them from the lower Gulf Coastal Lowlands.

Lying on a low, barely perceptible sandy rise on Lake Miccosukee's southwestern shore, the park is within the flat corridor through which the lake drains, at roughly 80 feet (24 m) above sea level. Away from the mound group the natural surface is nearly level, so that the most pronounced relief in the park is artificial: Mound 1 stands about 49 feet (15 m) above the surrounding ground.

=== Rock layers ===
Beneath the park, the Tallahassee Hills are built of a varied mass of sand, silt, and clay. The surface layer is the late Miocene Miccosukee Formation, a weathered red clayey quartz sand; it passes gradually downward into the middle Miocene Hawthorn Formation and then the early Miocene St. Marks Formation. In Jefferson County the Hawthorn is a waxy clay rich in phosphate, interbedded with sands that also contain phosphorite (phosphate-bearing rock). It is generally 50 to 70 feet (15 to 21 m) thick across the central and southern county and rests on an eroded surface of the older beds below, a gap in the geologic record known as an unconformity. The St. Marks Formation is a white to pale-orange, fine-grained sandy limestone (calcilutite) up to about 120 feet (37 m) thick, which likewise rests on an eroded surface of the Suwannee Limestone, the oldest rock exposed in the county, dating to the Oligocene.

At greater depth, wells record the Suwannee Limestone above a thick layer of carbonate rock from the Eocene (the Ocala Group, Avon Park Limestone, and Lake City Limestone), below which Paleocene, Cretaceous, and finally Paleozoic beds descend to a quartzitic sandstone reached at about 7,900 feet (2,400 m).

=== Soils ===
Soils at the park follow its gentle relief. Well-drained Lucy loamy fine sand and Orangeburg sandy loam, which reach into the park from the northwest, carry the upland mixed woodland; moderately well-drained Blanton fine sand covers the center, where past cultivation was concentrated; and poorly drained Albany sand along the northern rim supports a young, early-successional upland hardwood forest. On the low, wet ground of the southern margin, Plummer and Pelham fine sands and Pamlico–Dorovan mucks (dark, waterlogged soils rich in decayed plant matter) underlie the bottomland forest, basin swamp, and depression marshes.

=== Hydrology ===
Meaningful surface drainage is confined to the park's far southern margin, where a few intermittent streamlets and more persistent seeps feed Lake Drain, a blackwater channel flowing toward Lake Miccosukee. Three depression marshes at the southern edge of the park, set within upland hardwood forest, connect to Lake Drain at least seasonally.

By safeguarding these headwaters and wetlands, the park contributes to recharge of the Floridan aquifer, the region's principal source of groundwater. The Floridan, a thick sequence of middle Eocene to early Miocene carbonate rocks, underlies Jefferson County and is recharged in part through sinkholes around Lake Miccosukee, whereas the overlying Hawthorn Formation yields only minor, discontinuous secondary aquifers.

=== Climate ===
The park has a humid subtropical climate (Köppen Cfa), with hot, humid summers and mild winters. The nearest long-term weather station, at Tallahassee International Airport approximately 25 miles (40 km) to the west, records roughly 59 inches (1,500 mm) of annual precipitation, most of which falls in summer thunderstorms between June and September.

Climate data for Tallahassee International Airport, the nearest weather station (1991–2020 normals, extremes 1892–present)
Month	Jan	Feb	Mar	Apr	May	Jun	Jul	Aug	Sep	Oct	Nov	Dec	Year
Record high °F (°C)	84 (29)	89 (32)	91 (33)	95 (35)	102 (39)	105 (41)	104 (40)	103 (39)	102 (39)	97 (36)	89 (32)	84 (29)	105 (41)
Mean daily maximum °F (°C)	63.9 (17.7)	67.8 (19.9)	74.2 (23.4)	80.2 (26.8)	87.4 (30.8)	90.8 (32.7)	92.1 (33.4)	91.5 (33.1)	88.6 (31.4)	81.7 (27.6)	72.5 (22.5)	65.9 (18.8)	79.7 (26.5)
Daily mean °F (°C)	52.2 (11.2)	55.6 (13.1)	61.4 (16.3)	67.3 (19.6)	75.2 (24.0)	80.8 (27.1)	82.5 (28.1)	82.4 (28.0)	79.1 (26.2)	70.3 (21.3)	60.2 (15.7)	54.4 (12.4)	68.5 (20.3)
Mean daily minimum °F (°C)	40.5 (4.7)	43.5 (6.4)	48.6 (9.2)	54.4 (12.4)	63.0 (17.2)	70.8 (21.6)	73.0 (22.8)	73.2 (22.9)	69.6 (20.9)	58.8 (14.9)	48.0 (8.9)	42.9 (6.1)	57.2 (14.0)
Record low °F (°C)	6 (−14)	−2 (−19)	20 (−7)	29 (−2)	34 (1)	46 (8)	57 (14)	57 (14)	40 (4)	29 (−2)	13 (−11)	10 (−12)	−2 (−19)
Average precipitation inches (mm)	4.41 (112)	4.28 (109)	5.24 (133)	3.53 (90)	3.36 (85)	7.76 (197)	7.14 (181)	7.60 (193)	4.91 (125)	3.24 (82)	3.10 (79)	4.24 (108)	58.81 (1,494)
Average precipitation days (≥ 0.01 in)	8.9	8.1	8.0	6.7	7.5	14.3	16.4	14.8	9.0	5.9	6.3	8.3	114.2
Source: NOAA

== Ecology ==
=== Flora ===
Plant life seen along the Weedon Trail

The Florida Natural Areas Inventory (FNAI) recognizes five natural community types within the park; the FNAI uses the term for a recognizable mix of plants, animals, and other organisms that occurs again and again wherever similar physical conditions exist. The largest of these communities is the upland mixed woodland, covering 112.57 acres (45.56 ha) across the central and northern portions of the property. In the FNAI's classification, this woodland pairs hardwoods with pines under a canopy that can be open or partly closed: southern red oak (Quercus falcata), mockernut hickory (Carya alba), post oak (Q. stellata), blackjack oak (Q. marilandica), and black oak (Q. velutina) grow alongside shortleaf and longleaf pine (Pinus echinata, P. palustris). Shrubs and small trees such as flowering dogwood (Cornus florida) and sparkleberry (Vaccinium arboreum) are scattered beneath them, and the ground is thickly covered with grasses, forbs (broad-leaved herbs), and hardwood sprouts.

Upland mixed woodland grows naturally only in a band of northern Florida between Jackson and Marion counties, reaching a little way into Georgia. Much of that band was converted to farmland long ago, leaving the community in scattered remnants.

As the FNAI describes it, upland hardwood forest is a shady forest of mostly deciduous trees, mixed with some evergreens, on moist ground that fire rarely reaches; its typical trees include southern magnolia (Magnolia grandiflora), pignut hickory (Carya glabra), sweetgum (Liquidambar styraciflua), live oak, laurel oak (Q. hemisphaerica), and American beech (Fagus grandifolia). It is the park's second most extensive community, covering about 49.83 acres (20.17 ha). Live oak and southern magnolia lead the canopy at the park, but years of earlier management for northern bobwhite quail thinned it, leaving the stand grassier and younger, at an earlier stage of succession, than it would otherwise be.

The remaining three communities occupy the wet southern edge of the property: bottomland forest (16.16 acres (6.54 ha)), basin swamp (7.14 acres (2.89 ha)), a forested wetland in a low basin, here with swamp tupelo (Nyssa biflora) and bald cypress (Taxodium distichum), and three small depression marshes (3.11 acres (1.26 ha) combined), shallow wetlands that fill low spots in the land. Mature live oaks encircle the southernmost marsh, and buttonbush (Cephalanthus occidentalis) grows in its deepest water; the two marshes nearer the power-line right of way are edged with St. John's wort and have more open centers dominated by herbs. The remaining 1.31 acres (0.53 ha) is mapped as developed land.

=== Fauna ===
The park lies within the Florida Wildlife Corridor, a statewide network of nearly 18 million acres (73,000 km^{2}) of connected conservation lands and working landscapes established under the Florida Wildlife Corridor Act of 2021. The corridor is intended to keep such lands linked so that animals can move between them to find mates, food, and shelter, sustaining genetic diversity in populations that would otherwise be isolated.

Across the park's uplands, elevations and soils are suitable for the gopher tortoise (Gopherus polyphemus), which the Florida Fish and Wildlife Conservation Commission (FWC) lists as threatened at the state level. Only a few abandoned burrows have been recorded, and no occupied burrows are currently known within the park; the park's management plan expects routine prescribed burning to improve conditions for the species.

The depression marshes and swamps host a range of wetland wildlife. Frogs recorded there include the cricket frog, southern leopard frog, bronze frog, and spring peeper, while mosquitofish (Gambusia spp.) live in the standing water, and a patch of open water in the basin swamp is fringed with Virginia chain fern (Woodwardia virginica). Because Lake Miccosukee lies just to the north, the wetlands also draw wading birds: the little blue heron (Egretta caerulea), also listed by the FWC as threatened, appears periodically, along with the great egret, wood duck, and pileated woodpecker. Mammals reported from the basin swamp and bottomland forest include the raccoon, Virginia opossum, and marsh rabbit.

== Recreation ==
Beyond the mounds, the park offers birding, hiking the Weedon Trail, picnicking, and wildlife viewing. To limit erosion and damage to Mound 1, an elevated viewing platform was built to overlook it, and visitors are no longer permitted to walk on the mound itself.

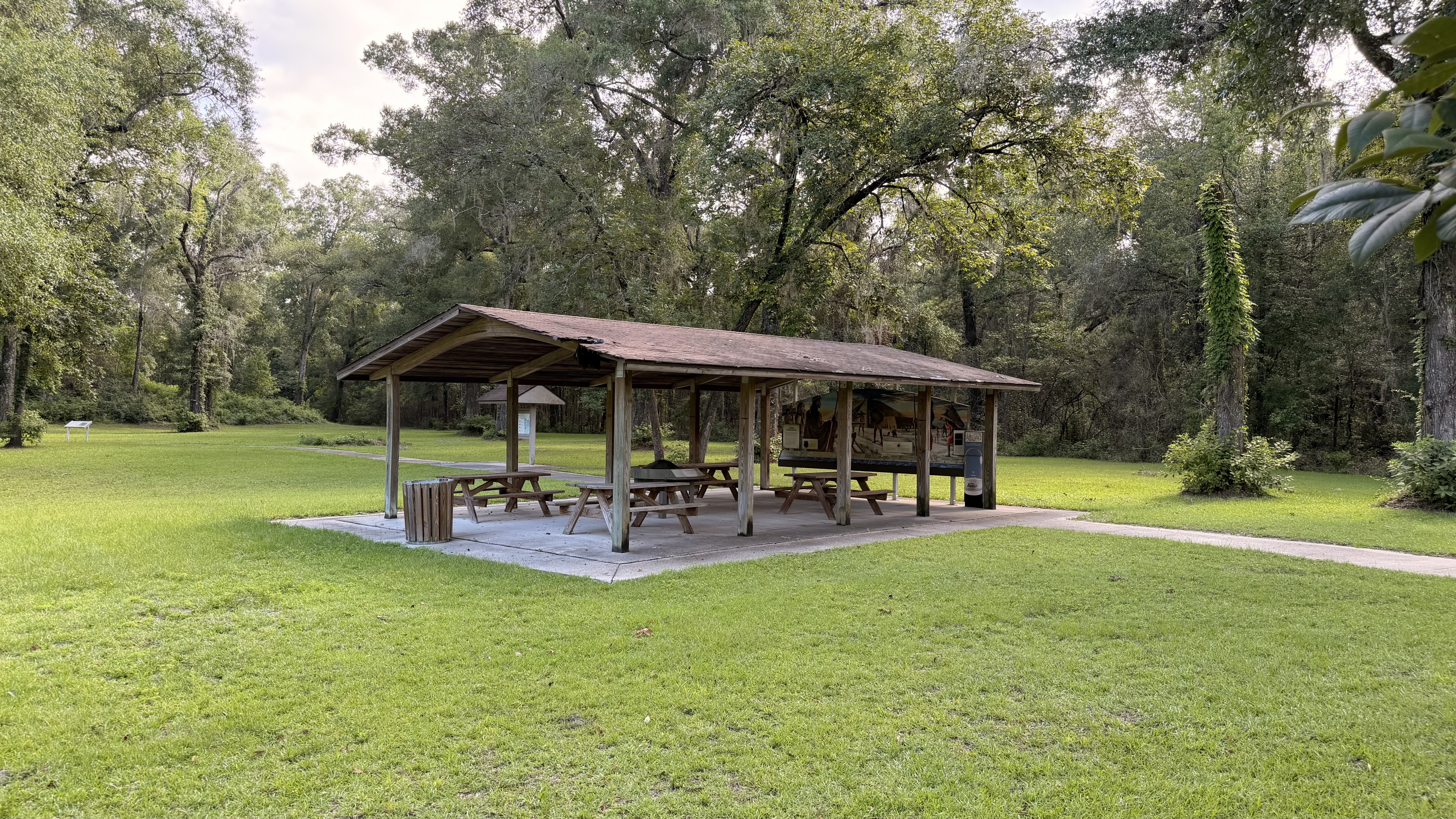
The park's interpretive pavilion.

An interpretive pavilion presents the history of the site, and additional signs are placed along the paved walking path. Its exhibit includes interpretive panels, a tactile replica of Mound 1 that visitors can touch, and audio narration.

=== Visitor information ===
As of 2026, the park is open daily from 8:00 a.m. to sunset, and admission is $3 per vehicle, collected through an honor box. The pavilion and the Mound 1 viewing platform are wheelchair-accessible.
