= Countergradient variation =

Countergradient is a type of phenotypic plasticity

Countergradient variation is a type of phenotypic plasticity that occurs when the phenotypic variation determined by a biological population's genetic components opposes the phenotypic variation caused by an environmental gradient. This can cause different populations of the same organism to display similar phenotypes regardless of their underlying genetics and differences in their environments.

To illustrate a common example known as countergradient growth rate, consider two populations. The two populations live in different environments that affect growth differently due to many ecological factors, such as the temperature and available food. One population is genetically predisposed to have an increased growth rate but inhabits an environment that reduces growth rate, such as a cool environment, and thereby limits the opportunities to take full advantage of any genetic predisposition. The second population is genetically predisposed to have a decreased growth rate but inhabits an environment that supports an increased growth rate, such as a warm environment, and allows members of the population to grow faster despite their genetic disadvantage. Since the genetic influence directly counteracts the environmental influence in each population, both populations will have a similar intermediate growth rate. Countergradient variation can reduce apparent variability by creating similar phenotypes, but it is still possible for the two populations to show phenotypic diversity if either the genetic gradient or the environmental gradient has a stronger influence.

Many examples of countergradient variation have been discovered through the use of transplant experiments. Countergradient variation of growth rate is one of the most common examples. Growth rate and body size have important ecological implications, such as how they impact an organism's survival, life history, and fecundity. Countergradient variation has been described in many ectothermic animals, since ectotherms rely on environmental temperature to regulate their metabolic rates, and thus, their growth rates. Ectotherms grow at a slower rate as latitude increases due to this impact of temperature. However, under countergradient variation, when these same animals are placed in a common environment with their low-latitude relatives, they grow faster relative to the low-latitude population. These studies are useful in predicting how animals can adapt to and will survive in different environmental conditions.

== History ==
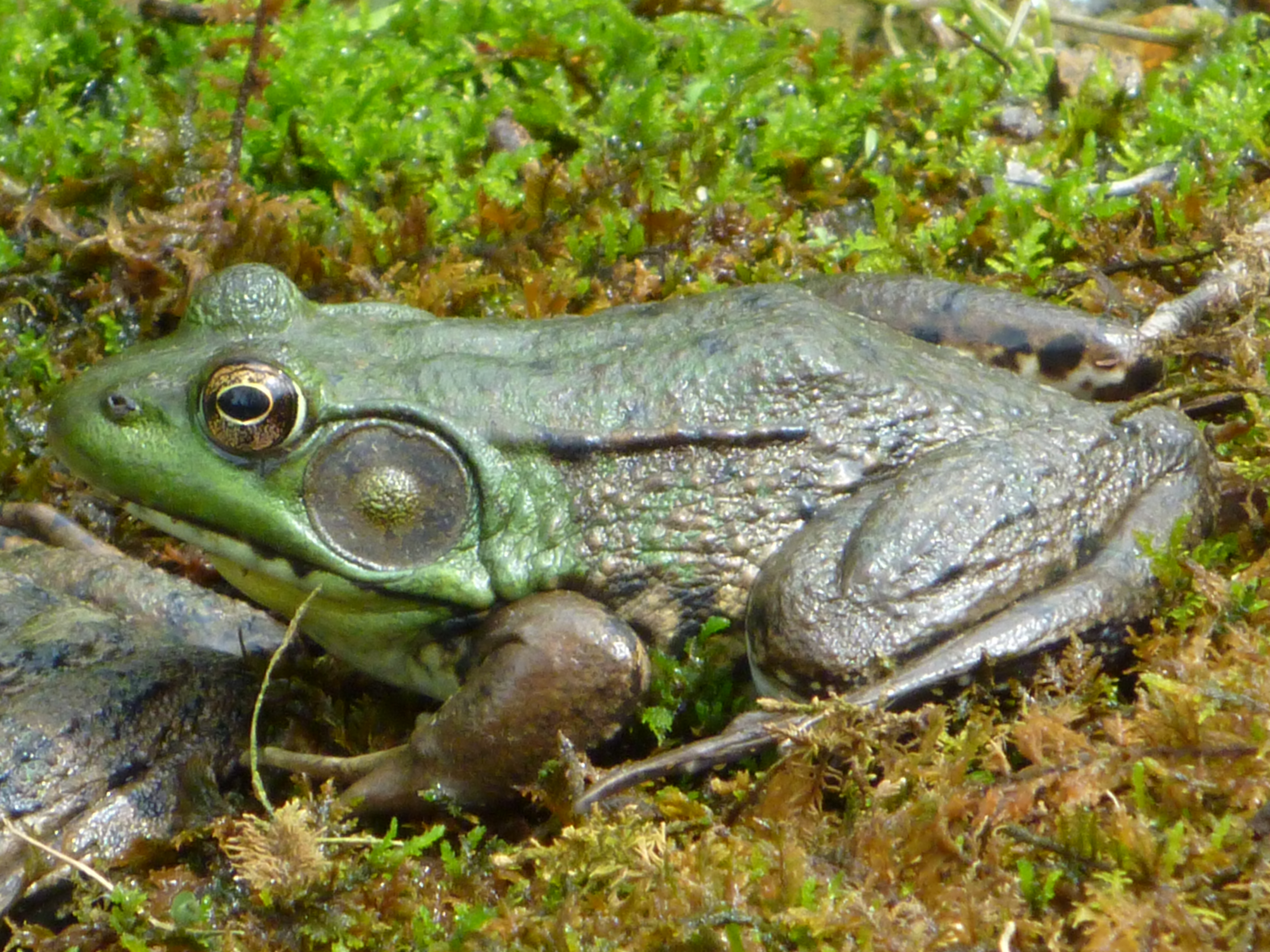
Green frog Lithobates clamitans unexpectedly grows faster in montane populations

Countergradient variation, originally termed "contra-gradient variation", was coined by Richard Levins in his 1968 book Evolution in Changing Environments. Levins first used the term when describing patterns of body size across an altitudinal gradient in populations of Drosophila, and since then many other instances of countergradient variation have been discovered. A study by Keith Berven and others was the first to find countergradient variation in a vertebrate. Specifically, they found that in comparing montane, high altitude, populations to lowland, low altitude populations of the green frog (Lithobates clamitans, formerly Rana clamitans), rates of growth and development were higher in the montane populations. This is counter to what is expected since high altitude populations grow slower than low altitude ones in their respective environments. Similar to the results of this study, most of the known instances of countergradient variation are associated with a latitudinal or altitudinal gradient having an effect on growth rate (see Examples section).

== Examples ==
The following are among the discovered cases of countergradient variation. The species name is followed by the trait affected and the environmental gradient studied.

=== Animals ===
- Drosophila melanogaster – body size; altitude
- Menidia menidia – growth; latitude
- Lithobates clamitans – developmental rate; altitude
- Lithobates sylvatica – growth; latitude and altitude
- Sceloporus undulatus – growth; latitude

=== Plants ===
- Laminaria saccharina – growth; latitude
- Carex aquatilis – shoot height; temperature and latitude
- Spartina angilca – growth and survival; tide elevation and succession stage

== Mechanisms ==
Countergradient variation is the opposite of cogradient variation, in which the environmental effect on the phenotype enhances the genetic effect on the phenotype. One common way to test for both of these patterns is with transplant experiments. By bringing the two populations to the same environment, the environmental effect on phenotype is eliminated and only the genetic effect will cause variation. If cogradient variation is occurring, the same relationship will be seen in the common environment as the two natural environments. However, if countergradient variation is occurring the opposite relationship of what is seen in the natural environments will be seen in the common environment. For example, if Population 1 has higher growth than Population 2 in their respective natural environments, countergradient variation can be detected if, when brought to the same environment, Population 1 now has lower growth than Population 2. Many of the examples listed above were discovered through these types of experiments. However, the mechanisms of how these differential growth rates arise is not fully understood.

Take the example of Sceloporus undulatus, the eastern fence lizard. These lizards demonstrate countergradient variation in growth rate across a latitudinal gradient. That is, in a common environment eggs from populations from the northern part of their range hatch out sooner than the eggs from populations at a more southern range. This is opposite the pattern seen in their native habitats. One explanation for this could be that the northern eggs are also naturally larger, so they have more yolk energy available. Originally this maternal investment in larger eggs was thought to support increased developmental rate. However when yolk is removed from the eggs so that the populations have equal energy sources, there is still a substantial difference in growth. Therefore, the mechanism behind this differential growth rate may lie in the efficiency of energy use.

== Ecological relevance ==
Populations that inhabit high latitudes experience shorter growing seasons than those that inhabit low latitudes due to the differences in seasonality. Because of this, it is thought that countergradient variation of growth is a means to compensate for the short amount of time juveniles have to prepare for winter. With a genetic disposition to grow faster, these individuals can reach a large enough body size to survive through the winter. Increased body size is also associated with higher reproductive output. Additionally, when countergradient variation acts on developmental rates, embryos that develop sooner or hatch out larger will have more time to grow or require less resources, respectively.

Since these inherently fast growth rates are not observed in all populations, it seems there are potential trade-offs that would prevent this from being beneficial in low latitude populations. One proposed detriment of enhanced embryonic growth is that animals use too much of their supplied nutrients or yolk during development. In some species of lizards the yolk remaining after hatching is absorbed into the body and used as energy for growth as a hatchling. The use of more yolk energy during development diminishes the reserves available for hatchling growth and can impact hatchling survival. Another hypothesis is that animals that grow quickly do not expend as much energy on differentiation or cellular maintenance because they have shorter incubation times. This allows more energy to be used for growth, but less energy for differentiation. Increased growth has been shown to lead to higher occurrences of defects or complications that cause higher rates of mortality. Some examples include rapid growth leading to bone deformities in sandhill cranes and increased risk of cardiovascular problems in Atlantic salmon.

Animals are able to employ different strategies for growth and development to counteract environmental challenges. However, the fact that all individuals do not grow faster and the presence of the mentioned potential fitness trade-offs show that there must be some limit to how much animals can use countergradient growth to compensate for environmental conditions that cause slow growth. Studies of countergradient variation are being explored as a useful way to predict the evolutionary constraints animals face in differing environmental conditions.
