= Red Hills Region =

Region of the southeastern United States

Coordinates: 30.6113°N 84.0004°W

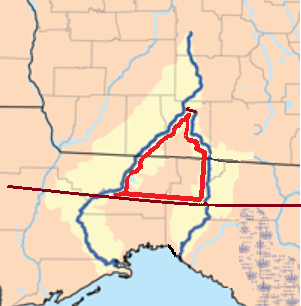
Red Hills is highlighted in red

The Red Hills or Tallahassee Hills is a region of gently rolling hills in the southeastern United States. It is a geomorphic region and an ecoregion.

== Location ==
The Red Hills physiographic region of northern Florida was defined in 1914 as most of Leon County north of the Cody Scarp, and small portions of southernmost Grady and Thomas counties in Georgia. The original tree cover of the region was a shortleaf pine-oak-hickory woodland with deep sandy clay soil. A wider definition of the Red Hills Region includes Jefferson County, Florida north of the Cody Scarp and the southern portions of Grady and Thomas counties in Georgia. This larger region consists of about 2,400 square kilometers (930 square miles) that is bounded by the Aucilla River on the east and northeast, by the Ochlockonee River on the west and northwest, and by the Cody Scarp on the south. The Red Hills physiographic region is part of the Tallahassee Hills/Valdosta Limesink ecoregion, which extends across northern Florida and southern Georgia from the Apalachicola River to the vicinity of Valdosta, Georgia.

A wider Red Hills section of Florida has been defined as extending 150 miles (240 kilometers) along the Alabama and Georgia borders, including, from east to west, Madison, Jefferson, Leon, Gadsden and Jackson counties.

There is a Red Hills Physiographic Province in south central Alabama.

== History ==
The area was first populated by Paleo-Indians in and around the various lakes in the southern part of the Red Hills. The Apalachee were found here in the 16th century, and were almost annihilated through wars, disease, and slavery. In the 18th century, the Seminoles made the Red Hills their home until the early 19th century and the Seminole Wars.

Also in the 19th century, white settlers began cotton plantations, which thrived until the Civil War. At one time, Leon County, Florida, was the 5th largest producer of cotton among all counties in Georgia and Florida. After the Civil War, many of the Red Hills' plantations became winter homes and quail hunting plantations for wealthy northerners; the area between Thomasville and Tallahassee is still home to dozens of such plantations, such as Greenwood, Pebble Hill, and Goodwood.

== Geography ==
Rolling hills, ravines and gullies covered by forests and the large lakes of Lake Jackson, Lake Iamonia, Lake Miccosukee, Lake Lafayette, and Lake Talquin. The highest point in the Red Hills is 280 feet (85 meters) north of Tallahassee by 10 miles (16 kilometers). The soil is red clay deposited during the last ice age from the Appalachian Mountains. Rivers running through the Red Hills Region are the Aucilla River, Ochlockonee River, and Telogia Creek. The St. Marks River is subterranean until it meets the surface in the Woodville Karst Plain.

== Flora and fauna ==
=== Trees ===
The area is covered in a number of native species. There are a variety of oak including southern live oak, water oak, laurel oak, white oak, overcup oak, post oak, black oak as well as other hardwood trees such as American sweetgum, a variety of magnolia, as well as hickory, flowering dogwood, red maple, and redbud. Conifers are also abundant, including shortleaf pine, and loblolly pine. The Red Hills are home to some of the last remnants of the great longleaf pine forests remaining in the nation.

=== Animal life ===
The Red Hills Region supports the northern bobwhite quail, white-tailed deer, red fox, raccoon, eastern gray squirrel, nine-banded armadillo, black bear, migratory bird, federally endangered red-cockaded woodpecker, gopher tortoise, eastern diamondback rattlesnake, eastern tiger salamander, and many other animals and plants.

=== Features ===
The Red Hills Region serves as one of the highest recharge areas for the Floridan aquifer — which is critical to the drinking water supply for residents of Florida, Georgia, and Alabama. The Red Hills Region also has the largest concentration of undeveloped plantation lands in the United States. The Red Hills has been identified for special conservation efforts, and The Nature Conservancy has designated the Red Hills as one of America's "Last Great Places".

== Parks and natural areas ==
- Alfred B. Maclay Gardens State Park
- Lake Jackson Mounds Archaeological State Park
- Elinor Klapp-Phipps Park

== Red Hills Horse Trials ==
Each spring, the equestrian community meets for the Red Hills Horse Trials, an Olympic qualifying event held at Elinor Klapp-Phipps Park.
