= Lake Miccosukee =

Lake in the state of Florida, United States

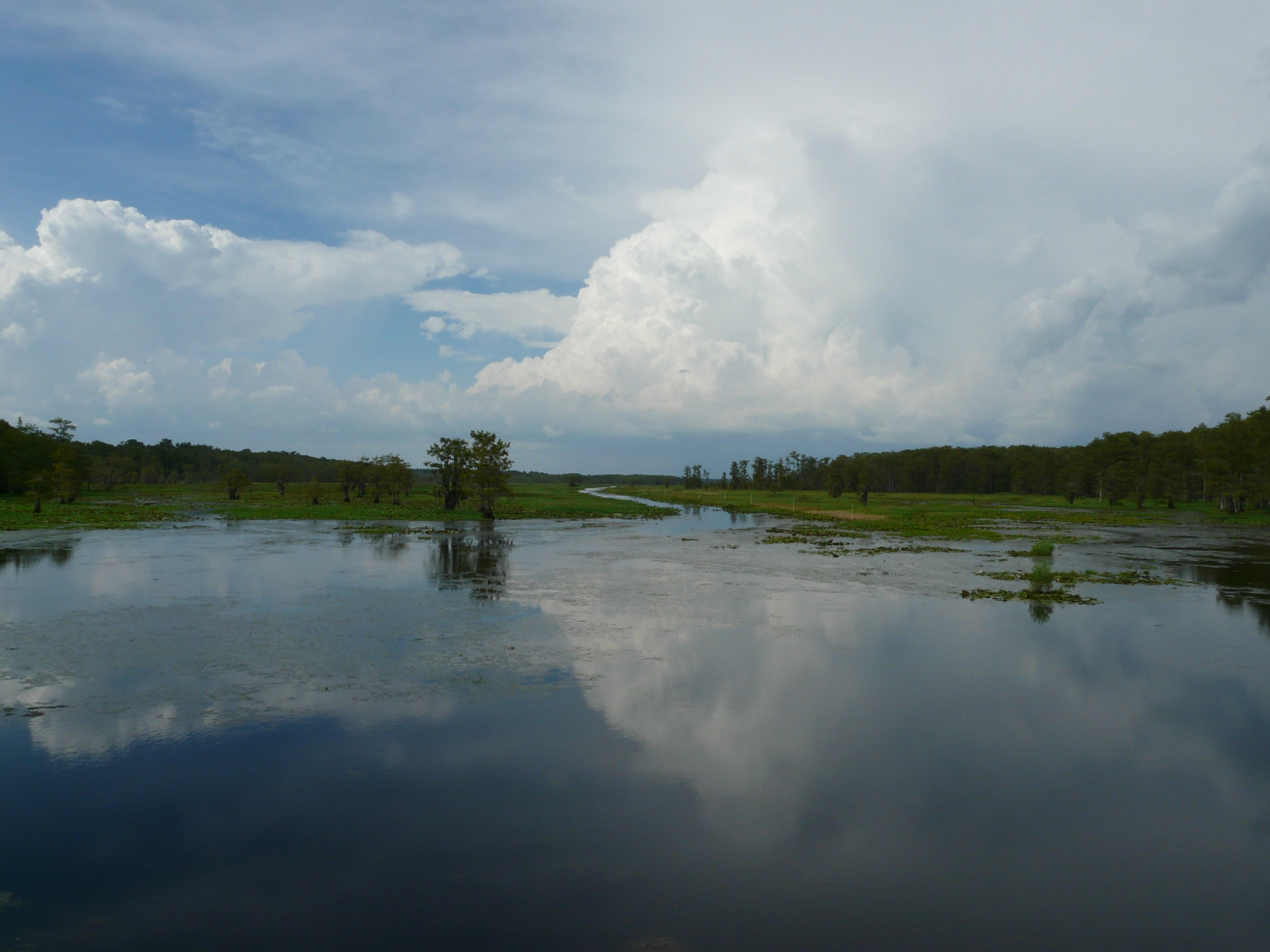
- Lake Miccosukee, Florida

- Location within Florida Location within the United States
- Location: Jefferson / Leon counties, Florida, United States
- Coordinates: 30.5707°N 83.9791°W
- Type: prairie lake
- Basin countries: United States

Lake Miccosukee is a large swampy prairie lake in northern Jefferson County, Florida, located east of the settlement of Miccosukee. A small portion of the lake, its northwest corner, is located in Leon County. The small town of Miccosukee, Florida is located on the north eastern shore of the lake in Leon County.

The lake is named after the Miccosukee people.

== Characteristics ==
Lake Miccosukee forms the northern border between Jefferson and Leon Counties. The lake is controlled by an active sink hole located in the northern end and water represents the actual surface of the Floridan Aquifer as the caverns beneath the sink reach into the aquifer.

== History ==
=== Early history ===
Lake Miccosukee was a natural prairie lake prior to settlement by the Miccosukee people. Thousands of years ago, the lake connected directly with the St. Marks River on the south end. Today, that connection is underground and reappears above ground in Wakulla County. The shores of the lake attracted ancient Paleoindians and the Apalachee later on. From the 1830s to 1860 the land around the lake was home to a few cotton plantations.

=== Later history ===
Lake Miccosukee's descriptions have changed through time, particularly in regard to coverage of the lake's surface with aquatic plants. Like Lake Lafayette and Lake Iamonia in Leon County, this was a prairie lake. In 1876, a plant-clogged Lake Miccosukee was described as being covered by maidencane, monocotyledonous and white bonnets. In 1914, a large amount of open water was noted; the lake was said to be covered with water to a depth of 2 to 5 feet. The southern end had grass and buttonbushes projecting above the water. Aerial photographs taken in 1976 and 1988 show a plant-clogged lake; only 19.4% of the lake was open water.

Around the late 1940s, aquatic plant coverage of the lake's surface varied as the basin periodically emptied and refilled on a 10 year cycle. This is a natural cycle for lakes of this type in northern Florida such as Lake Iamonia and Lake Jackson in Leon County. As aquatic vegetation grew back, more and more of the lake's surface gradually became overgrown with plant life. More extensive restoration could have created deep areas within the lake and future open water habitats, but permits could not be obtained form the Forestry Service to allow fires to burn the muck deposits within the lake. There was concern that smoke from the fires could cause traffic accidents on Highway 90 which crosses the lake system at its south end.

In 1954, an earthen dike, concrete spillway, and gate was built around the sinkhole to keep the lake from drying naturally as it had done in previous years as a prairie lake. At the southern end of the lake, a wooden weir was built to keep the water from disappearing into the Lloyd Sink. Between 1954 and 1988, the lake was stabilized to the point that it only drained twice. Water level stabilization accelerates the aging process of lake by allowing build-up of excess plant life, sediment, and muck created from dying plant life. By the late 1990s the lake was almost completely covered with plant life and in essence turning the lake into a marsh good for alligators and waterfowl but poor for sport fishing.

=== Restoration ===
In 1999, a drought struck northern Florida and part of the lake was allowed to drain into the aquifer. The lake was excavated in many places and most of the lake bottom was burned during the draw-down to get rid of the muck. Restoration provides for healthy populations of fish and other wild life. Further restoration could have occurred creating deeper areas within the lake. The Florida Forestry Service could not obtain fire permits with concerns of traffic accidents on nearby U.S. Highway 90.

== Recreation ==
Lake Miccosukee provides duck hunting in north Florida and has scenic value. One endangered species of plant exists in only three places in the world. The Miccosukee gooseberry (Ribes echinellum) can be found on two places on the shores of Lake Miccosukee.
