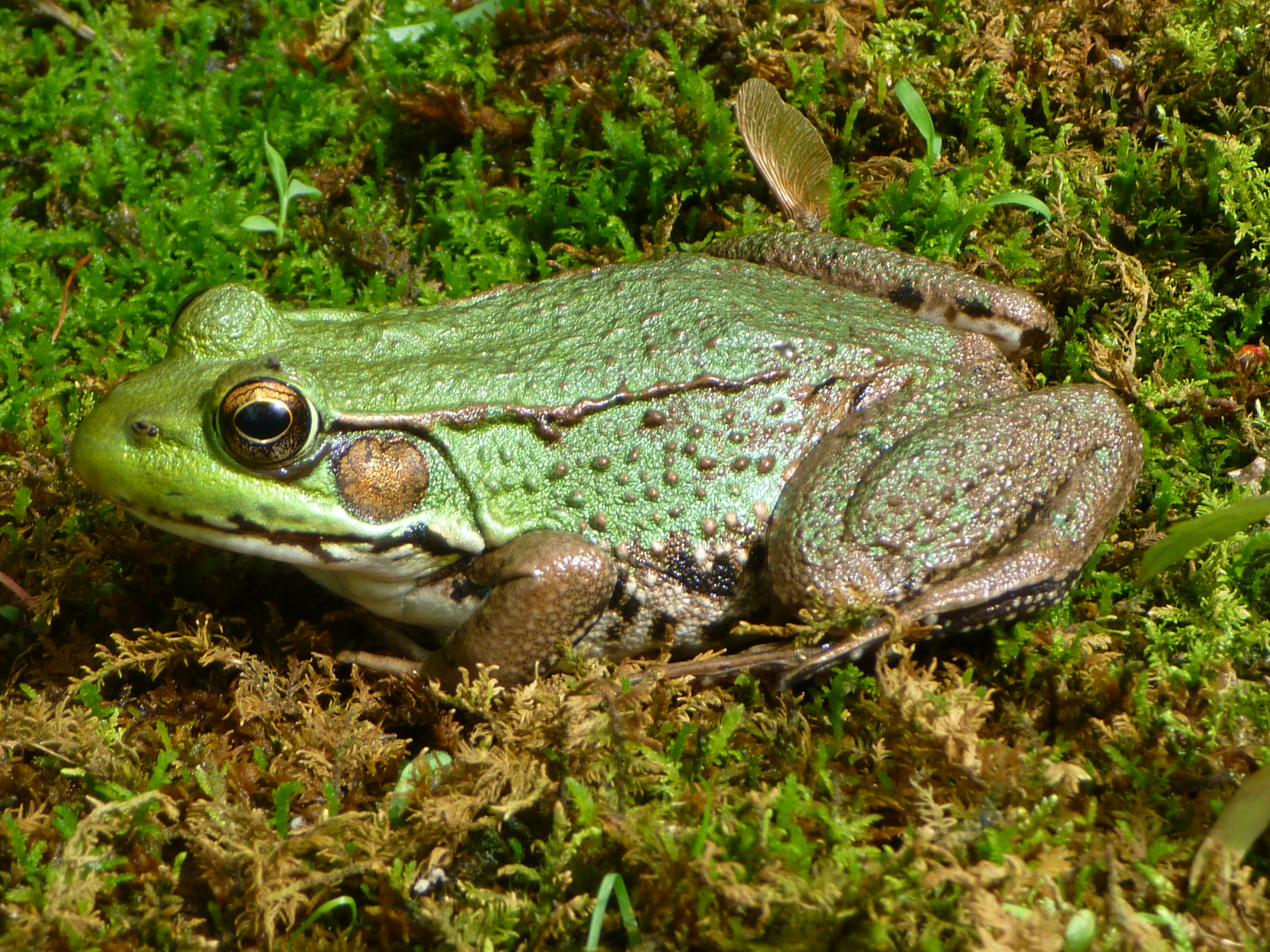
- Female, Tewksbury Township, New Jersey

Scientific classification
- Domain: Eukaryota
- Kingdom: Animalia
- Phylum: Chordata
- Class: Amphibia
- Order: Anura
- Family: Ranidae
- Genus: Lithobates
- Species: L. clamitans
- Subspecies: L. c. melanota

Trinomial name
- Lithobates clamitans melanota (Rafinesque, 1820)
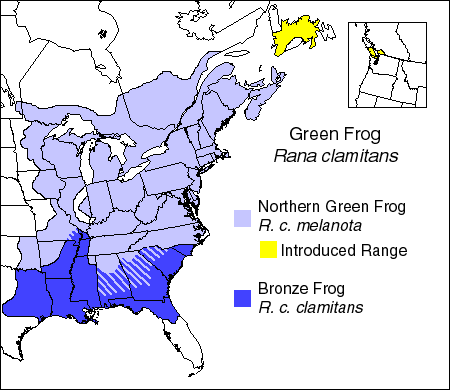
- Native range

Synonyms
- Rana clamitans melanotus

= Northern green frog =

Subspecies of amphibian

The northern green frog (Lithobates clamitans melanota) is a subspecies of the green frog, Lithobates clamitans. It is native to the northeastern North America and has been introduced to British Columbia. Its mating call sounds like the single note of a plucked banjo. It is also quite common in the pet trade.

== Description ==
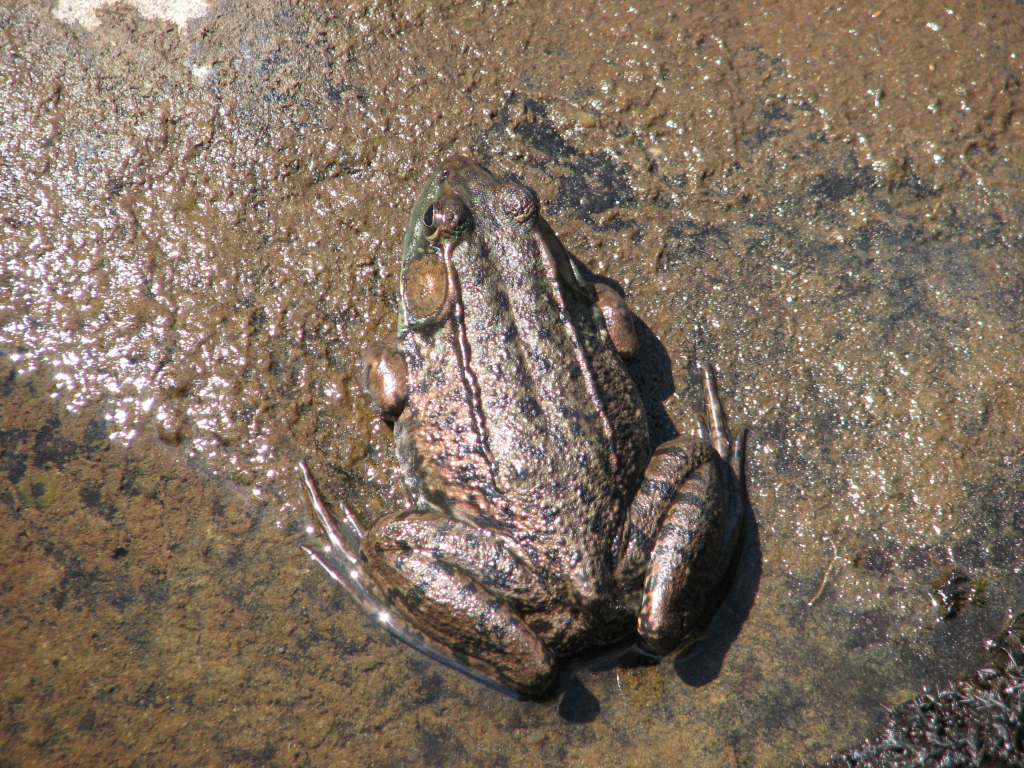
Top view, Temagami, Ontario

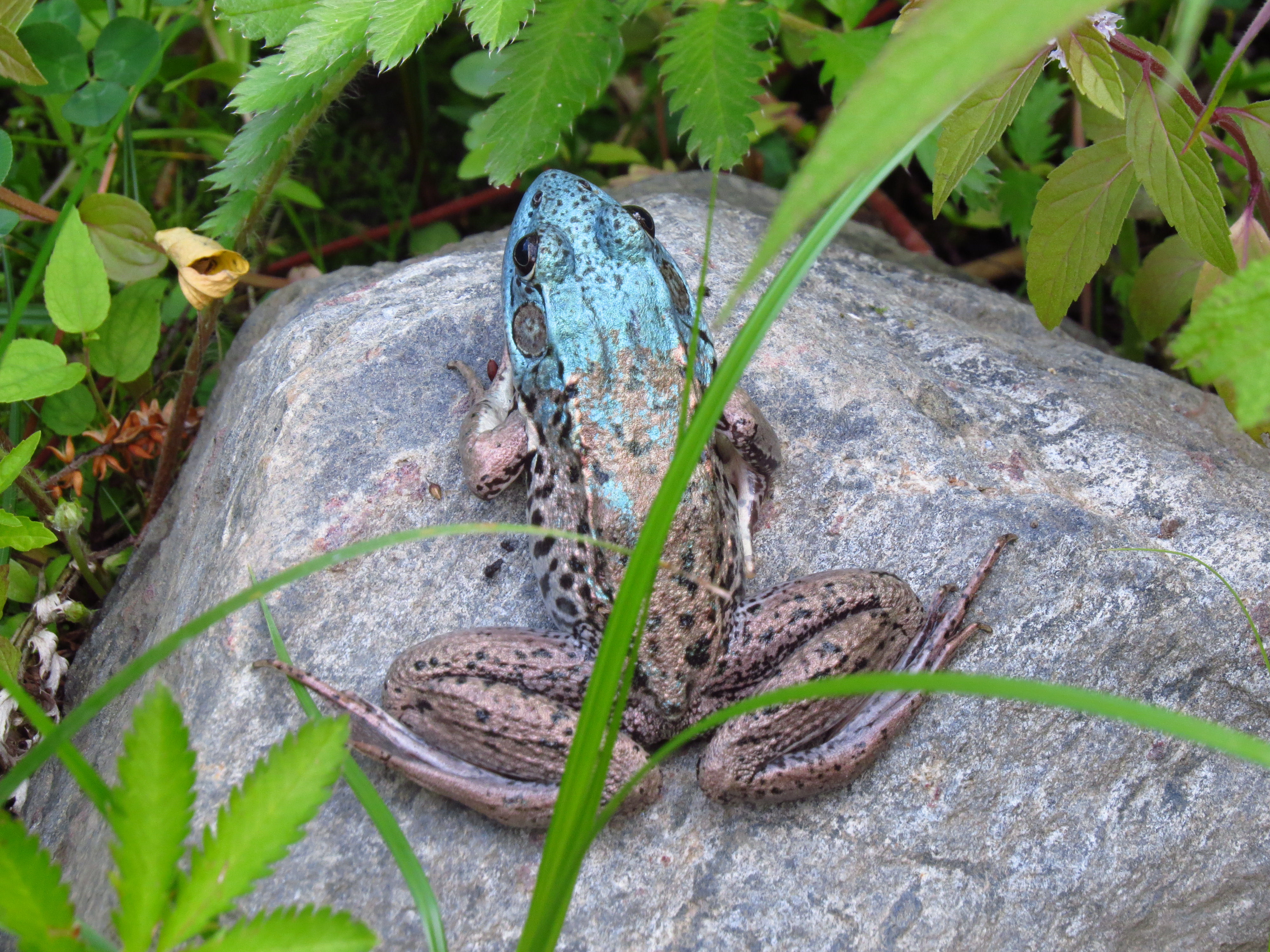
Blue coloured variation

Adult green frogs attain a snout-vent length (excluding the hind legs) of 5.5 to 9 cm (2.25 to 3.5 in). The ground color is green or brownish-green. Where the green back and sides fade into the white belly and chest, some black mottling may occur. Some individuals may have light-gray mottling on the chest. The most prominent feature is the pair of dorsolateral folds extending from behind the tympanic membranes to just beyond halfway down the back. The male's single vocal sac is internal. When it calls, the throat swells, but the vocal sac is not visible.

== Habitat ==
The northern green frog dwells in marshes, swamps, ponds, lakes, springs, and other aquatic environments. It is active both day and night.

== In Captivity ==
Northern Green frogs are kept as common pets among the pet trade, although they're often mislabeled as bullfrogs. A 10 gallon half land/half water aquarium or woodland terrarium is suitable for one frog, but two or more frogs will require a larger space to reduce stress and competition. Crickets, night crawlers and meal worms provide adequate nutrition. The tank water should be changed once a week to reduce parasites and diseases. If tap water is used, it should be treated or tested to remove harmful metals and ammonia. On average, in captivity, Northern green frogs live for 10 years.
