= Prairie lake =

Type of ephemeral lake

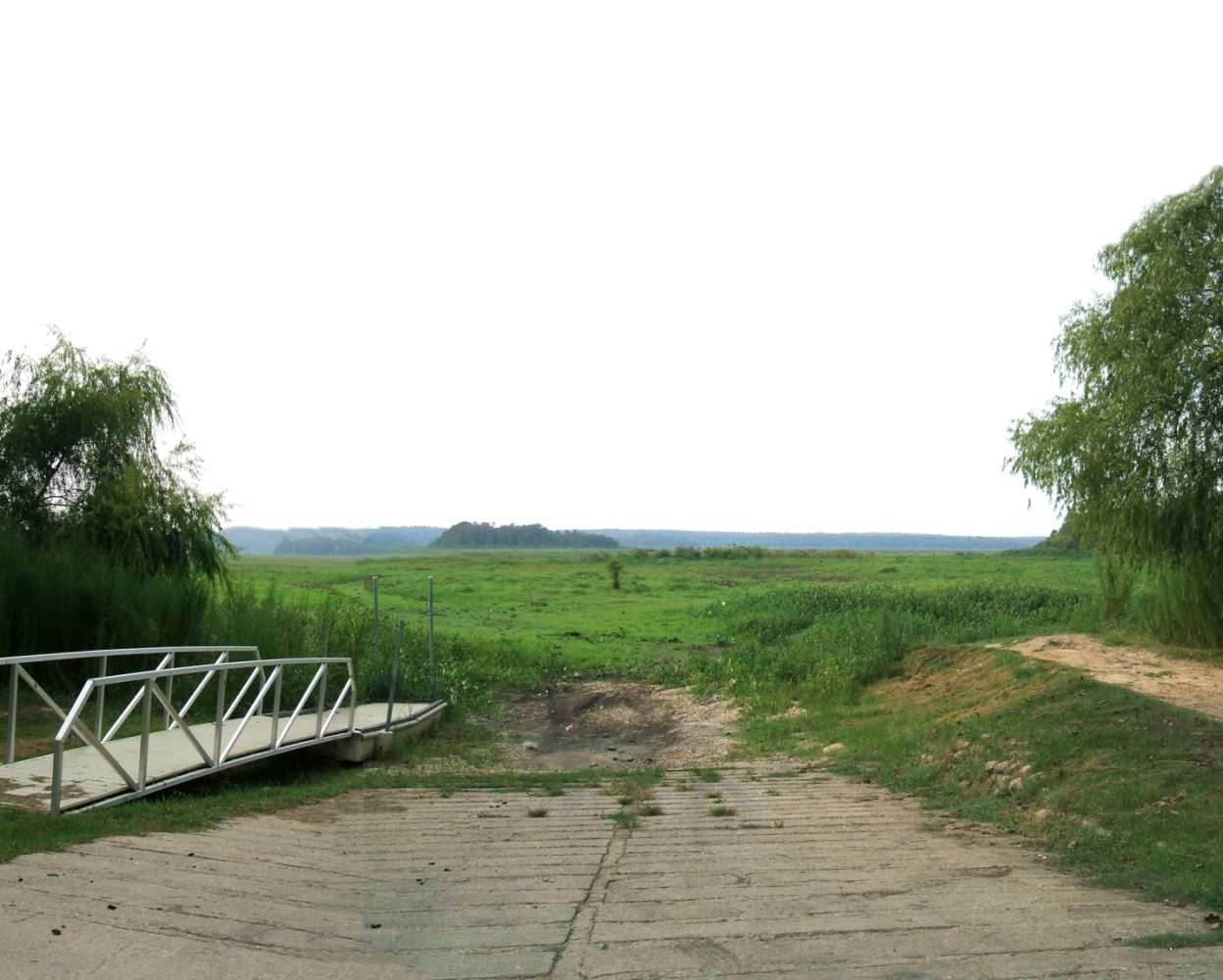
Lake Iamonia in its "prairie stage" in northern Leon County, Florida during the drought of 2007

A prairie lake is a somewhat shallow lake that will empty naturally during dry seasons, allowing a variety of terrestrial plants to flourish upon the rich nutrients in the exposed lakebed, and the lakes eventually refill with water returning to their previous aquatic state.

In northern Florida, a flatwoods/prairie lake is generally a shallow basin in flatlands with high water table and often with sinkholes. These lakes frequently have a broad littoral zone; still water or flow-through; sand or peat substrate; variable water chemistry, but characteristically colored to clear, acidic to slightly alkaline, soft to moderately hard water with moderate mineral content sodium, chloride, sulfate; oligo-mesotrophic to eutrophic. These lakes are often associated with aquifers.

Northern Florida has four large prairie lakes: Lake Lafayette, Lake Jackson, Lake Iamonia, and Lake Miccosukee. During the antebellum period in Florida, cotton plantation owners used these lakes to graze cattle, sheep, and other animals when dry. Prairie lakes also exist in the upper midwestern United States in Iowa, Montana, and Minnesota in Black Rush Lake, and Lake Shaokatan, a shallow prairie lake in west central Lincoln County. The geology may be different from those in Florida.

== Resources ==
- Florida Natural Areas Inventory
- Paisley, Clifton; From Cotton To Quail, University of Florida Press, c1968.
- EPA study
- University of Minnesota
