= George Nesmith Bridge =

Bridge in Florida, United States of America

George NeSmith bridge
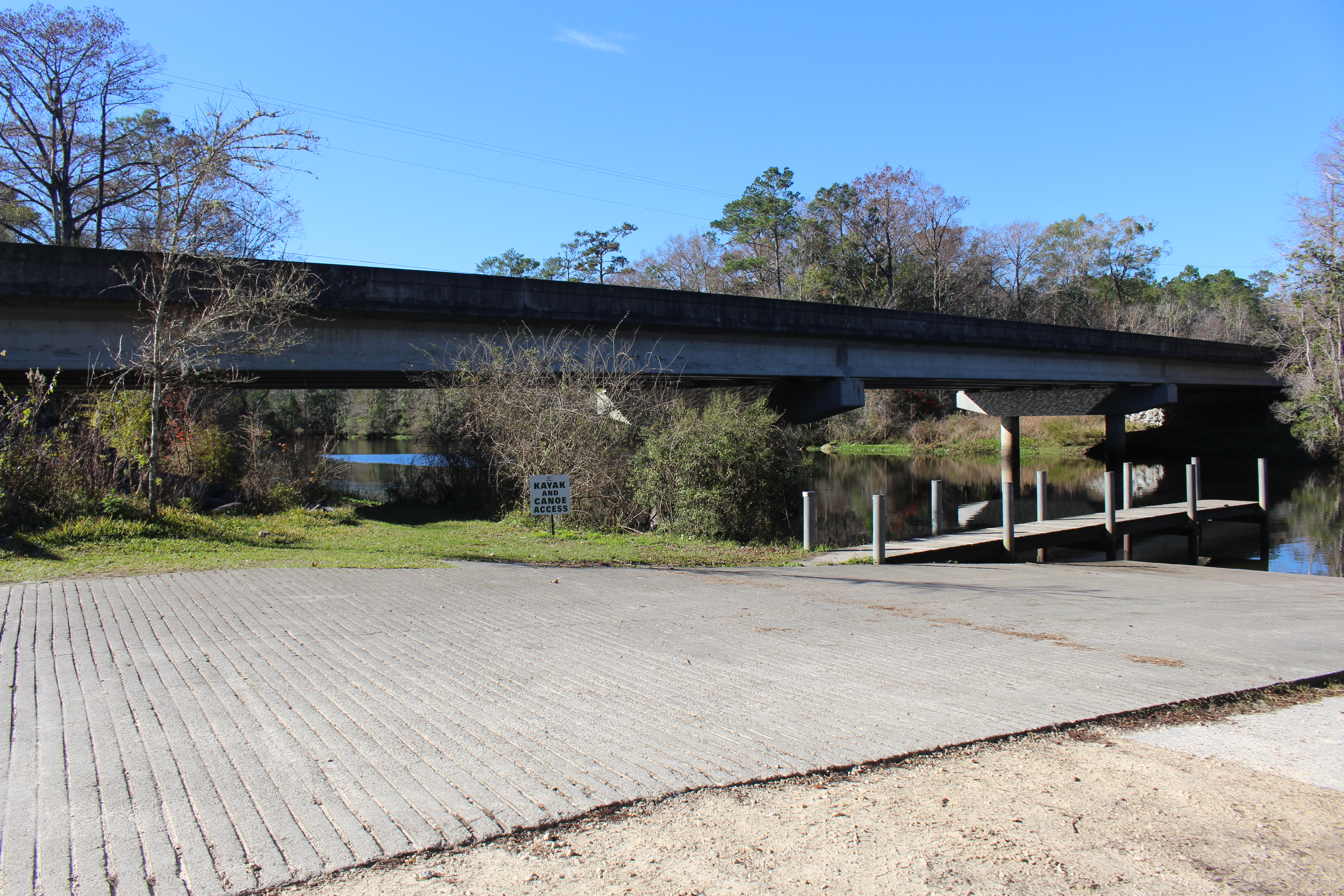
- Coordinates: 30.1988°N 84.1780°W
- Carries: 2 General purpose lanes of US 98
- Crosses: St. Marks River
- Locale: Newport, Florida
- Maintained by: Florida Department of Transportation
- ID number: 590056

Characteristics
- Clearance below: 40

History
- Opened: 2001

Statistics
- Daily traffic: 2300

The George Nesmith Bridge carries U.S. Route 98 (US 98) over the St. Marks River in Newport, Florida.
