= East River (Florida) =

River in Florida, United States

- Downstream in St. Marks NWR

Location
- Country: United States
- State: Florida
- County: Wakulla

Physical characteristics
- Source
  - location: Florida
  - coordinates: 30°11′57″N 84°6′42″W
- Mouth: St. Marks River
  - location: Florida
  - coordinates: 30°5′19″N 84°10′44″W

The East River is a 10-mile-long (16 km) river entirely within Wakulla County, Florida, draining part of the St. Marks National Wildlife Refuge into the St. Marks River.

A dam within the refuge, crossed by the Florida Trail, creates the 245-acre (99 ha) impoundment known as the East River Pool, with a boat ramp allowing access by canoes and small boats. Oyster bars are abundant around the mouth of the river.

During the early 19th century, salt works were established along the East River, and were destroyed by a tropical storm in June 1863. Later during the American Civil War, a small skirmish was fought between Union and Confederate troops along the East River on March 3–5, 1865, resulting in the capture of the East River Bridge by Union forces prior to the Battle of Natural Bridge.

== List of crossings ==
| Crossing | Carries | Image | Location | Coordinates |
|---|---|---|---|---|
| Headwaters | | | | 30°10′11″N 84°8′3″W |
| Twin Bridges | CR 59; Lighthouse Road | | | 30°8′43″N 84°8′27″W |
| | Florida Trail | | | 30°7′37″N 84°8′59″W |
| Mouth (St. Marks River) | | | | 30°05′19″N 84°10′44″W |
