= Lake Lafayette =

Lake in Leon County, Florida, US

- Location within Florida Location within the United States

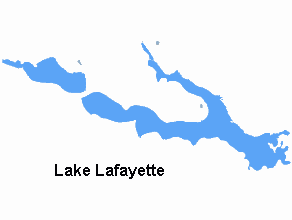
- Map of Upper Lake Lafayette, Lake Lafayette, Piney Z Lake and Alford Arm
- Location: Tallahassee, Leon County, Florida
- Coordinates: 30.4376°N 84.1736°W
- Type: prairie lake, hypereutrophic
- Catchment area: 79.6 sq mi (206 km^{2})
- Basin countries: United States
- Surface area: 2.85 sq mi (7.4 km^{2})

Lake Lafayette is a prairie lake located in the coastal lowland in eastern Tallahassee, Leon County, Florida with US 27 / State Road 20 running close on its south side.

== History ==
=== Prehistoric ===
Originally known as Prairie Lake, Lake Lafayette is the remnant of a Pleistocene river delta. Water levels receded in the last ice age and the coast moved farther south of the site which became a river valley and eventual a tributary of the St. Marks River. Dissolution processes culminated in the formation of a large basin, 8,925 acres (36.12 km^{2}), a major sinkhole is located in Upper Lake Lafayette just South of the Cody Scarp.

The Lake Lafayette Basin is considered to be one of the premier paleoarchaelological sites in Florida. The lake area is surrounded by archaeological sites. A large number of Native American mounds surround the lake; one excavated mound is currently displayed at the Florida Museum of Natural History. The large middens on Lake Piney Z, and the Temple Mounds at Fallschase, are of particular interest. Native American settlements are common in the Lafayette Basin and Hernando de Soto spent the first Christmas in the New World at one of these sites.

=== Early 1800s ===
The early settlers of Leon County called Lake Lafayette 'Prairie Lake' as it looked much like a prairie during droughts. The lake took its name from the Lafayette land grant, the township (36-square-mile tract) on the north and east side of Tallahassee that was granted by the US Congress in 1824 to General Lafayette in gratitude for his military services in the American Revolutionary War.

In the late 1820s, portions of the Lafayette grant around the lake were sold and became plantations, each a few thousand acres in size. The Francis Eppes Plantation, Evergreen Hills Plantation and the Joseph Chaires Plantation grew cotton until the 1860s.

=== 20th Century ===
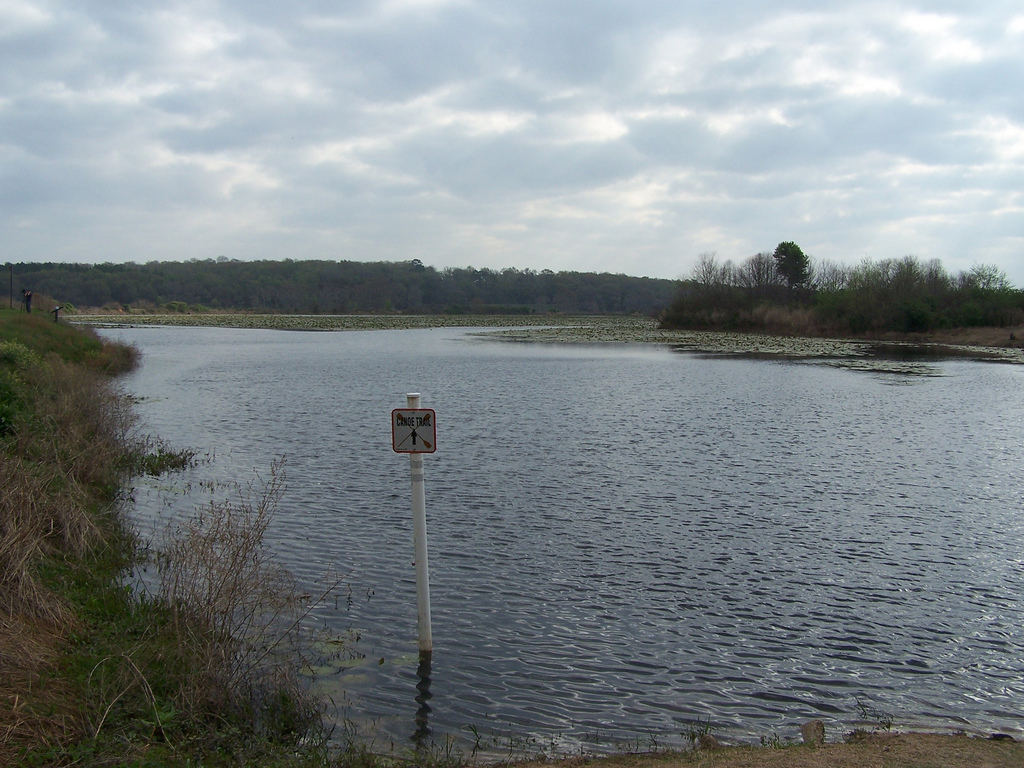
Lake Piney Z

Lake Lafayette functioned as one hydrological unit until 1948, when the owners of Piney Z Plantation constructed two earthen dikes in the middle of the lake and turned the central part of Lake Lafayette into a farm pond. More dikes were constructed and the lake was further broken up creating Upper Lake Lafayette, Piney Z Lake, Lower Lake Lafayette, and the Alford Arm. This began the process which started the lake(s) to transform into a vegetated marsh.

Of the four major lake basins in Leon County - Lake Jackson, Lake Iamonia, Lake Miccosukee, and Lake Lafayette - the Lake Lafayette basin is the most intensively developed; it is also considered the most modified lake basin in all of northern Florida, since it is no longer functioning in a natural fashion due to human effects. Lafayette Basin once functioned as a temporary lake, much like Lake Miccosukee and Lake Iamonia where water was frequently exchanged between the Lake Basin, the Floridan Aquifer (sink holes) and the St. Marks River through a series of connecting sloughs.

Lower Lake Lafayette is covered with floating islands of aquatic vegetation, called tussocks, usually the root systems of decaying Fragrant Water Lily, an invasive species. These are colonized by aquatic grasses, sedges and even small trees which float around the lake driven by the winds. They can trap or crush boats, docks and piers.

== Geography ==
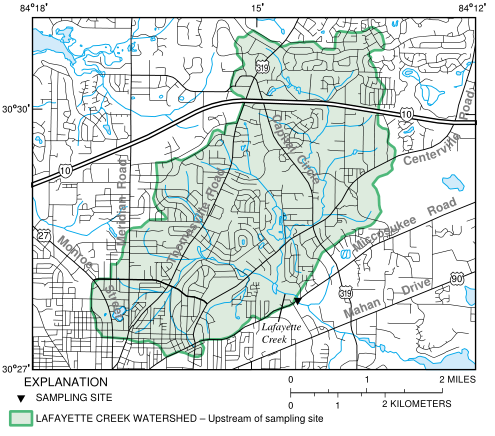
Lafayette Creek watershed

Lake Lafayette is fed by Lafayette Creek, draining a significant portion of northeastern Tallahassee; it has a drainage basin of approximately 10 sq mi (26 km^{2}). The creek flows into a small reservoir upstream from Lake Lafayette, impounded by a weir at the Weems Road bridge, then continues into Upper Lake Lafayette. Lower Lake Lafayette formerly flowed into the St. Marks River underground, and in sheet flow after heavy rains; it currently is connected to the river by a canal.

== Scientific ==
1. Lake Lafayette has a surface area of 2.85 square miles (7.4 km^{2}) and a drainage basin of 79.6 square miles (206 km^{2}) and is classified as Hypereutrophic.
2. Upper Lake Lafayette has a surface area of 0.46 square miles (1.2 km^{2}) and a drainage basin of 23.4 square miles (61 km^{2}). It's classified as hypereutrophic.
3. Lake Piney Z has a surface area of 0.3 square miles (0.78 km^{2}) and a drainage basin of 1.5 square miles (3.9 km^{2}) It's classified as hypereutrophic.
4. Lower Lake Lafayette (including Alford Arm) has a surface area of 2 square miles (5.2 km^{2}) and a drainage basin of 54.6 square miles (141 km^{2}) and classified as hypereutrophic.

== Recreation ==
Lake Lafayette offers several opportunities for recreation. Lafayette Heritage Trail Park is a public recreational park located in Tallahassee, Florida. The park offers many activities such as picnicking, hiking, fishing, kayaking, and mountain biking. The central feature of the park is Lake Piney Z, a 200-acre lake that is part of the Lake Lafayette system. "Two dams constructed around 1950 divided the lake into three sections, Upper Lafayette continues to be a wet prairie, Piney Z Lake is a 200 acre open water lake, and Lower Lafayette resembles a cypress-covered Louisiana bayou." The park has limited access to Lower Lake Lafayette, and is adjacent to Piney Z Plantation neighborhood as well as Tom Brown Park. The park is open sunrise to sunset.

Fishing is a popular activity in Lake Lafayette. Most of the fishing opportunities are in Piney Z and Lower Lake Lafayette with the former being the most popular. Visitors have access to Lake Piney Z via 7 fishing fingers as well as a hand launch boat ramp. The boat ramp offers access for kayaks and small boats; however, the lake is electric motor only and all watercraft must be carried to the water by hand as there is no trailer access. Many local residents frequent the parks numerous fishing fingers in pursuit of the two most popular species at lake Piney Z; largemouth bass and bream. Thanks to efforts by the FWC, the park hosts a healthy population of fish. FWC officials have placed several vegetation patches and fish attractors throughout the lake in order to improve catch rates for fishermen and improve the habitat of the fishery. The lake hosts a very large population of largemouth bass with bass averaging on the small side in the 9"-12" range with the occasional bass surpassing three pounds. Bass fishing can often be fast and furious from shore when a school of feeding bass swims within casting distance. It was originally prohibited to harvest largemouth bass from Piney Z; however, harvesting regulations have since been changed to align with the current FWC regulations for Florida lakes. Bluegill populations diminished over the years when largemouth bass harvest was prohibited. Numbers are expected to rebound with the repeal of the largemouth bass ban and the annual fall stocking of bluegill in Piney Z.

=== Lafayette heritage trail park ===
Lafayette Heritage Trail Park is a public recreational park located in Tallahassee, Florida. The park offers many activities such as picnicking, hiking, fishing, kayaking, and mountain biking. The central feature of the park is Lake Piney Z, a 200-acre lake that is part of the Lake Lafayette system. "Two dams constructed around 1950 divided the lake into three sections, Upper Lafayette continues to be a wet prairie, Piney Z Lake is a 200 acre open water lake, and Lower Lafayette resembles a cypress-covered Louisiana bayou." The park is adjacent to Piney Z Plantation neighborhood and Tom Brown Park. The park is open sunrise to sunset.

=== Trails ===
Lafayette Heritage Trail Park has several trails that offer hiking, running, and cycling opportunities. A map of the trail system can be found here.

In addition to the various footpath trails and mountain biking trails, Lafayette Heritage Trail park also serves as the start of the Lafayette Passage paddling trail.

=== Fishing ===
Lafayette Heritage Trail Park offers some of the best bank fishing in the Tallahassee area. Visitors have access to Lake Piney Z via 7 fishing fingers as well as a hand launch boat ramp. The boat ramp offers access for kayaks and small boats; however, the lake is electric motor only and all watercraft must be carried to the water by hand as there is no trailer access. Many local residents frequent the parks numerous fishing fingers in pursuit of the two most popular species at lake Piney Z; largemouth bass and bream. Thanks to efforts by the FWC, the park hosts a healthy population of fish. FWC officials have placed several vegetation patches and fish attractors throughout the lake in order to improve catch rates for fishermen and improve the habitat of the fishery. The lake hosts a very large population of largemouth bass with bass averaging on the small side in the 9"-12" range with the occasional bass surpassing three pounds. Bass fishing can often be fast and furious from shore when a school of feeding bass swims within casting distance. It was originally prohibited to harvest largemouth bass from Piney Z; however, harvesting regulations have since been changed to align with the current FWC regulations for Florida lakes. Bluegill populations diminished over the years when largemouth bass harvest was prohibited. Numbers are expected to rebound with the repeal of the largemouth bass ban and the annual fall stocking of bluegill in Piney Z.

Other species of fish that inhabit the lake include bowfin, gar, and crappie.
