= Lake Jackson (Leon County, Florida) =

Lake in Florida, United States

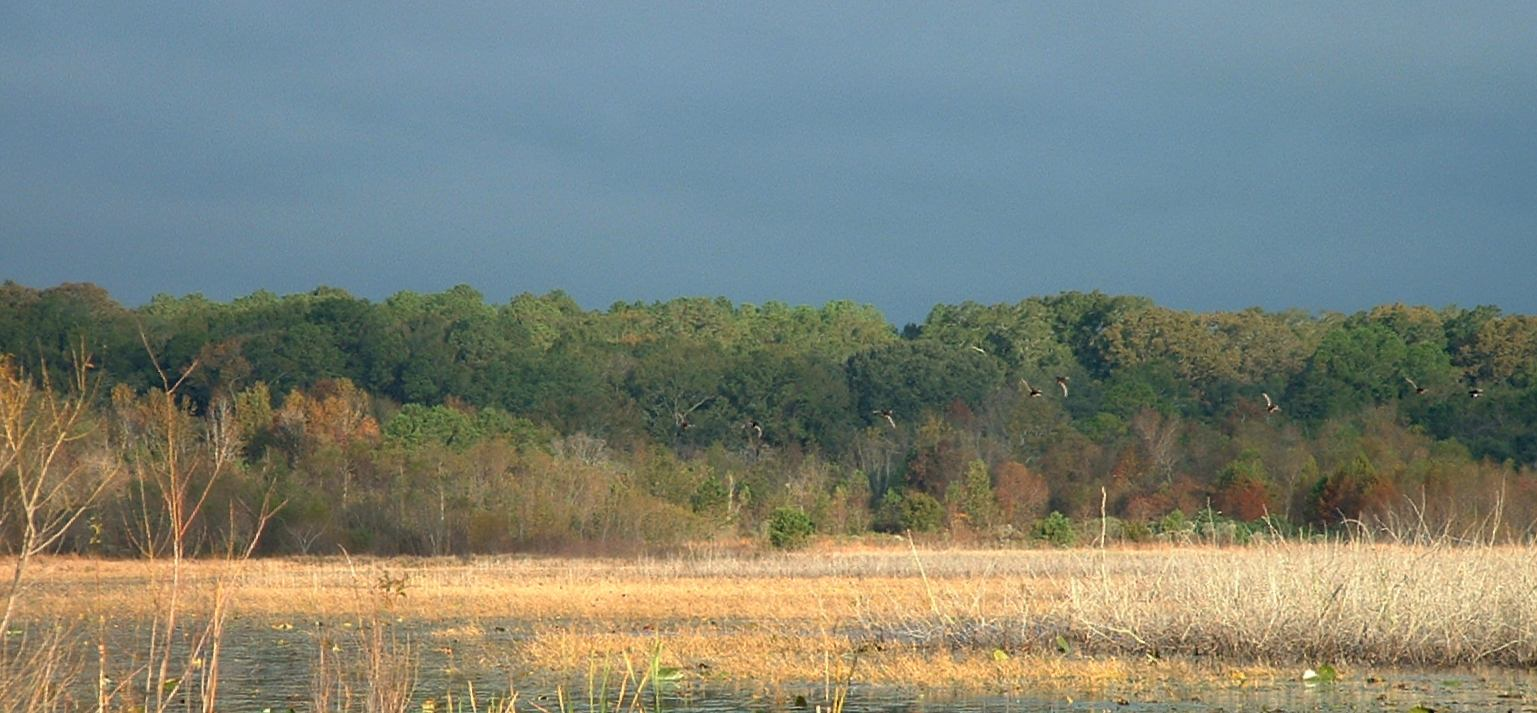
- Lake Jackson, September 2005, with storm approaching. Note flying ducks.

- Location within Florida Location within the United States

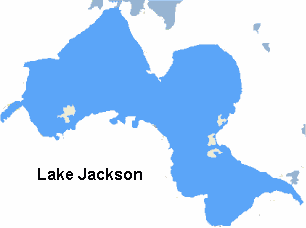
- Map
- Location: Leon County, Florida
- Coordinates: 30°31′46″N 84°19′21″W
- Type: prairie lake
- Primary outflows: sinkholes
- Catchment area: 42.1 square miles (109 km^{2})
- Basin countries: United States
- Max. length: 8 miles (13 km)
- Surface area: 6.2 square miles (16 km^{2})
- Surface elevation: max. 96.2 feet (29.3 m)

Lake Jackson is a shallow, prairie lake on the north side of Leon County, Florida, United States, near Tallahassee, with two major depressions or sinkholes known as Porter Sink and Lime Sink.

The lake is located in the Red Hills Region, and has fluctuated from periods of being dry to a maximum elevation of 96 feet (29 m) above sea level. The lake is approximately 7.5 miles (12 km) long and its area is 6.2 square miles (16 km^{2}). There is no outflow from streams or runoff.

== Geography ==
Interstate 10 runs across the southern tip of the lake.

There is another Lake Jackson and Little Lake Jackson in Sebring, Florida, not related to the current article.

The Lake Jackson Mounds Archaeological State Park is located adjacent to the lake.

== Geology ==
=== Drainage ===
Water drains from the lake into the Floridan Aquifer through the sinkholes. These are usually partially or completely plugged with sediments, but collapse when groundwater levels drop, allowing lake water to funnel into the aquifer, which can completely drain the lake. This has occurred on numerous occasions. Newspaper accounts report draining episodes in 1829, and again in 1840 and 1860. Sellards reports that the lake drained though a sinkhole in June 1907 and drained again during the summer of 1909. Lake Jackson drained again in November 1918, and yet again in January 1932 and October 1936. The lake drained in 1956–1957, and again in 1981–1982. More recently, Lake Jackson drained in 1999, May 2007, June 2012 and most recently in June 2021. During the 2007 drainage, the lake flowed down the Porter Sink, but pools of water still remained.

== Ecology ==
=== Fauna ===
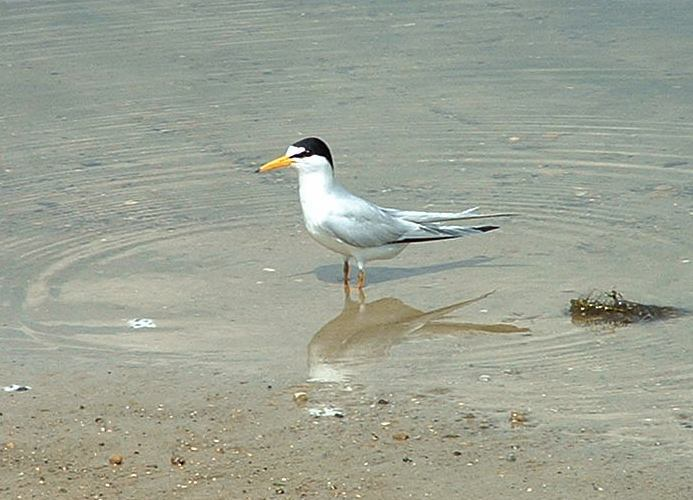
Least tern at Lake Jackson, Florida, May 2004

Large numbers of waterfowl species are found at Lake Jackson. These include great blue heron, little blue heron, great egret, snowy egret, limpkin, Moorhen, American coot, wood stork, osprey, bald eagle, fish crow, and least tern. Common reptiles and amphibians include the American alligator, Southern chorus frog, Southern leopard frog, and the Florida softshell turtle. Among the mammals that inhabit the shoreline is the round-tailed muskrat. Brown pelicans, rare inland, have also been found on occasion.

=== Flora ===
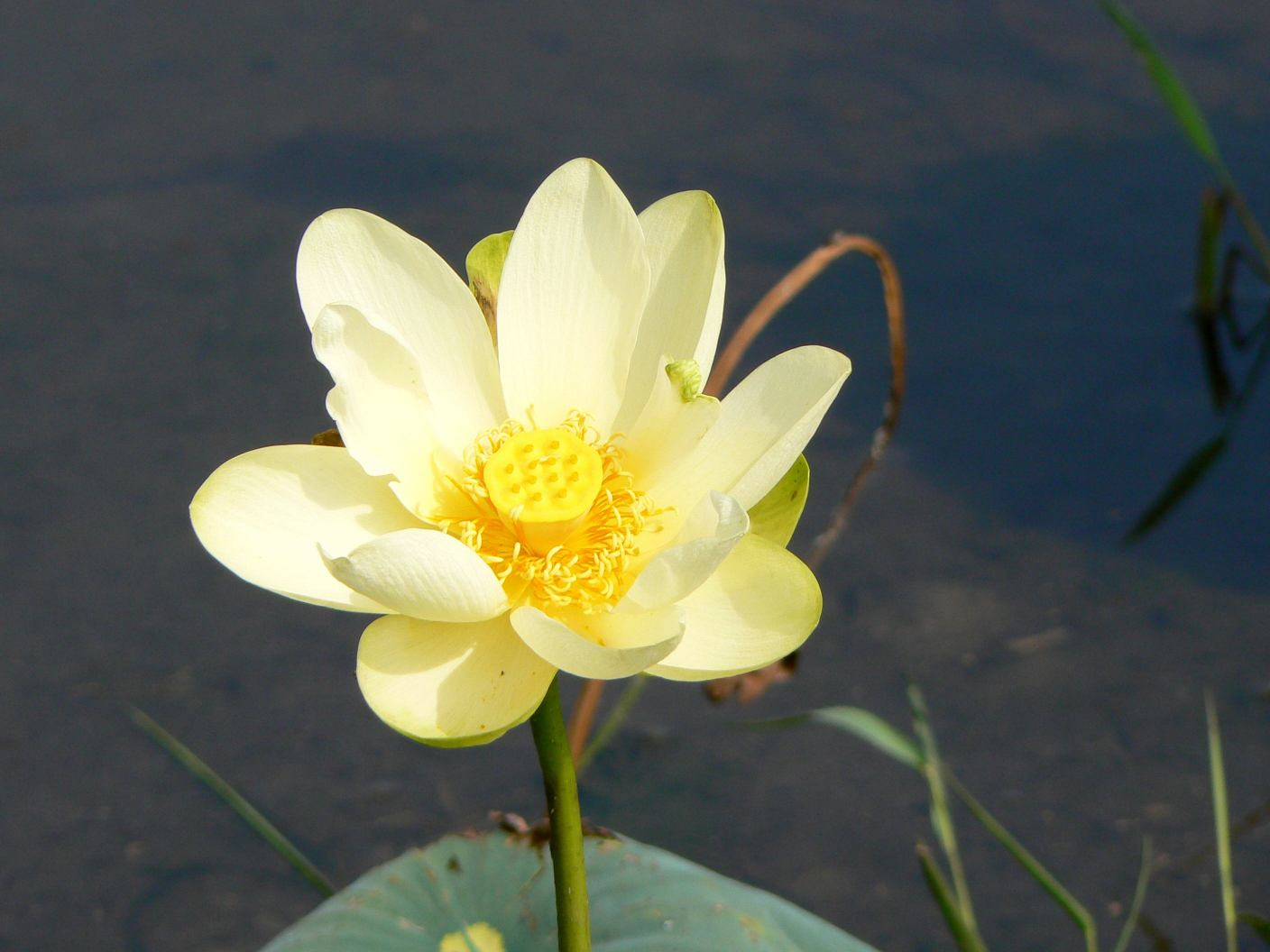
American lotus at Lake Jackson, Florida, August 2006

Submerged vegetation is abundant throughout the lake and include blue hyssop, coontail, green fanwort, variable-leaf milfoil, and bladderwort. Marsh plants include maidencane, pickerelweed, American lotus, and slender spikerush. Numerous wetland tree and woody plant species also inhabit the drier portions of the transitional marsh. These include sweetgum, a variety of oaks, wax myrtle, the Carolina willow (salix caroliniana), and elderberry. Exotic invasive species have also established themselves in some areas, including Chinese tallow and hydrilla.

== Preservation ==
Lake Jackson is part of the Lake Jackson Aquatic Preserve, along with Carr Lake and Mallard Pond. The preserve was established in 1973.

== Fire suppression ==
Lake Jackson Volunteer Fire Department was established in 1988 and serves the largest territory of all Leon County's Volunteer Fire Departments. They respond to between 75 and 100 service calls each month including incidents on Route 27, Route 90 and Interstate 10 with assistance from the Tallahassee Fire Department.
