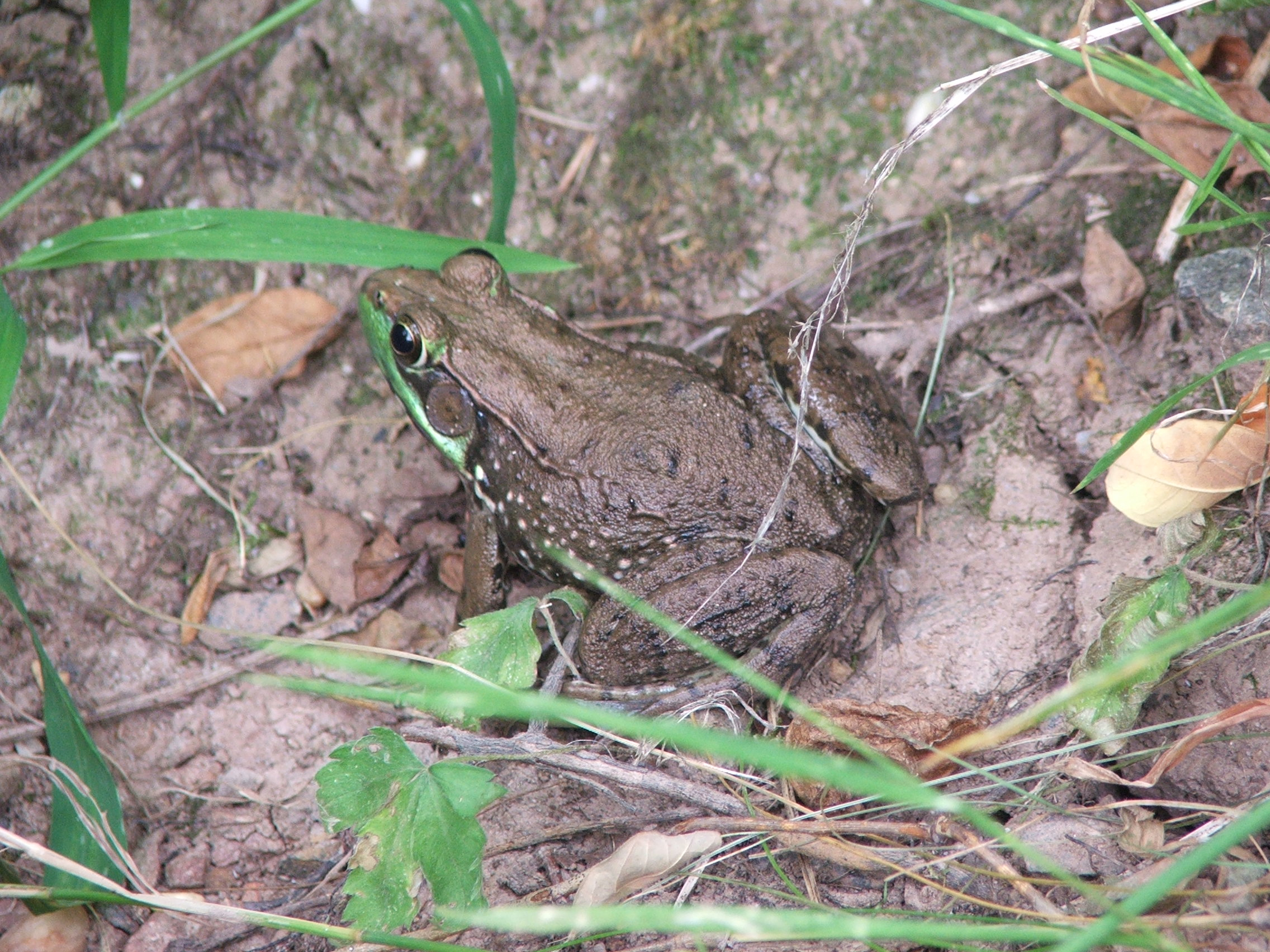

Scientific classification
- Kingdom: Animalia
- Phylum: Chordata
- Class: Amphibia
- Order: Anura
- Family: Ranidae
- Genus: Lithobates
- Species: L. clamitans
- Subspecies: L. c. clamitans

Trinomial name
- Lithobates clamitans clamitans (Latreille, 1801)
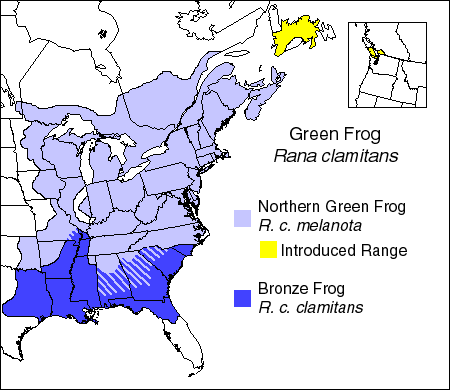
- Green Frog range

Synonyms
- Rana clamitans

= Bronze frog =

Subspecies of amphibian

The bronze frog (Lithobates clamitans clamitans) is a subspecies of Lithobates clamitans found in the southeastern region of North America.

== Description ==
The bronze frog grows up to 2–4 in (5.4–10.2 cm). Distinguishing characteristics include a bronze to brownish body, a white belly with dark, irregular blotches, and a bright-green upper lip and nose. Males may have yellowish throats. Bronze frogs are smooth-skinned, like all true frogs. They have long hind legs with webbed toes. Two dorsolateral folds begin behind the eye and runs two-thirds the length of body. The tympanum (ear disc) is larger in males.

== Behavior ==
Bronze frogs are nocturnal and solitary. They remain under cover, in logs and crevices, most of the time. Male bronze frogs court females with a distinct call. Researchers agree that the mating call of the bronze frog sounds like someone plucking a loose banjo string. Named for its body color, the bronze frog may be difficult to find until warm, humid evenings, when its mating call is heard. Colloquially referred to as the "banjo frog", the primary breeding call is an explosive "clunk," or "cloink" frequently repeated several times in succession, but less powerfully each time. Like many species of frogs, the males voice an aggressive call when concentrations of these frogs are high in breeding areas. This call is a quick, harsh, spitting sound that sometimes precedes an attack on a competitor.

== Distribution ==
Bronze frogs are found in the southeastern portion of the United States, from North Carolina to the eastern third of Texas.

== Habitat ==
Bronze frogs are found in shallow streams, ponds, marshes, springs, bayous, and bald cypress swamps with plenty of vegetation. They are active both day and night.

== Diet ==
Bronze frogs eat a variety of vertebrates and arthropods. They eat flies, crickets, fish, small snakes, crayfish, tadpoles, and other frogs.

== Breeding ==
It reaches sexual maturity in the first full summer after metamorphosis. Breeding season begins in early spring and lasts through the summer. Females lay 2,000–4,000 eggs in small masses attached to underwater vegetation. Eggs are 1.5 mm when laid, but grow to 6 mm as cells divide. Incubation is one to two weeks. Tadpoles are green with small, dark spots. They grow 1.0–1.5 inches (28 – 33 mm) before they metamorphose (change from tadpoles to frogs). Bronze frogs live seven to 10 years.
