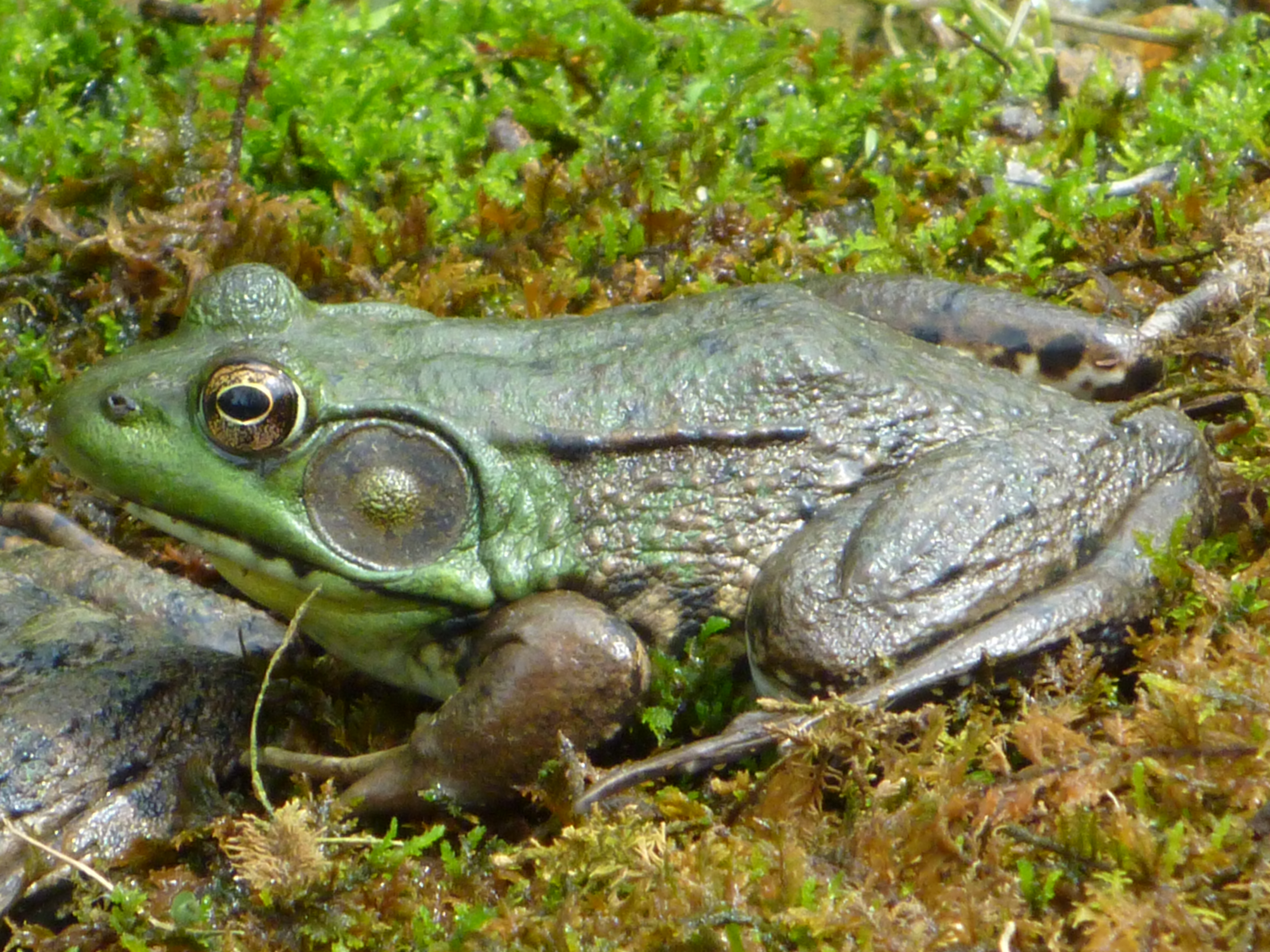
- Male, Tewksbury Township, New Jersey

Conservation status
- Least Concern (IUCN 3.1)

- Secure (NatureServe)

Scientific classification
- Kingdom: Animalia
- Phylum: Chordata
- Class: Amphibia
- Order: Anura
- Family: Ranidae
- Genus: Lithobates
- Species: L. clamitans

Binomial name
- Lithobates clamitans (Latreille, 1801)

Subspecies
- See text L. c. clamitans, bronze frog L. c. melanota, northern green frog
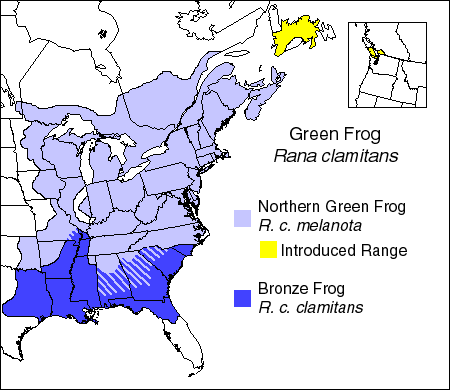
- Green frog range

Synonyms
- Rana horiconensis Holbrook, 1842; Rana fontinalis Holbrook, 1842; Rana clamitans Latreille, 1801

= Lithobates clamitans =

Green frog

Species of amphibian

Lithobates clamitans or Rana clamitans, commonly known as the green frog, is a species of frog native to eastern North America. The two subspecies are the bronze frog and the northern green frog.

These frogs, as described by their name, typically have varying degrees of green heads. These frogs display significant acts of territoriality, with males being the primary actors. Male green frogs use this technique against other male frogs in addition to other intruders that might have interest in nearing their territory. Territoriality also plays a role in mating, as females favor males who are strong in this field and exhibit strong mating calls. Male green frogs use four different types of breeding calls to attract potential female mates. Predators of the eggs of green frogs include beetles, water bugs, and water scorpions. Adult frogs are typically threatened by several types of birds.

== Taxonomy ==
Lithobates clamitans is a member of the true frog family Ranidae and genus Lithobates. Litho- meaning stone, a rock climber. Originally classified in the genus Rana until systematic revision, features of the genus are true frogs with slim waist and wrinkled skin, found across much of Eurasia and North America.

=== Subspecies ===
The two recognized subspecies of L. clamitans are:

- Lithobates clamitans clamitans (Latreille, 1801) – bronze frog
- Lithobates clamitans melanota (Rafinesque, 1820) – northern green frog

== Description ==
This species is a mid-sized true frog. Adult green frogs range from 5–10 cm (2.0–3.9 in) in body length (snout to vent, excluding the hind legs). The typical body weight of this species is from 28 to 85 g (0.99 to 3.00 oz). The sexes are sexually dimorphic in a few ways: mature females are typically larger than males, the male tympanum is twice the diameter of the eye, whereas in females, the tympanum diameter is about the same as that of the eye, and males have bright yellow throats. The dorsolateral ridges, prominent, seam-like skin folds that run down the sides of the back, distinguish the green frog from the bullfrog, which entirely lacks them.

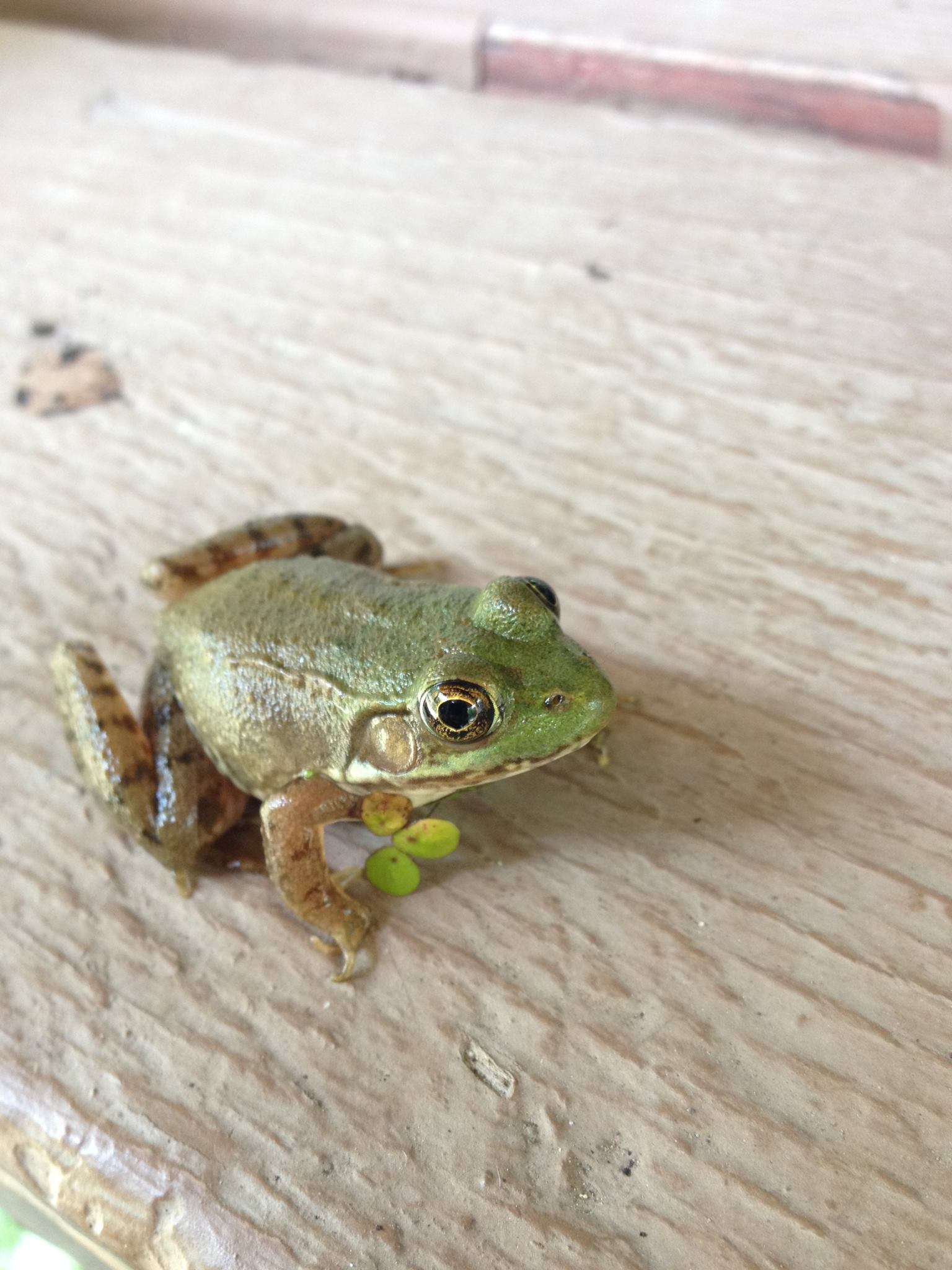
Young Green Frog

Green frogs usually have green heads while the body is brown, gray, or dark green. The green head can be more or less prominent on certain individuals, with some frogs only having green on the side of their heads while other frogs are green all the way down their back. The belly is white with black mottling. Male green frogs in breeding condition have yellow throats. Green frogs are darker colored on colder days to help absorb heat. Green frogs can sometimes be blue due to a genetic mutation known as axanthism that prevents the frog from producing yellow pigments (yellow and blue pigments together make the color green).

Green frog tadpoles are olive green and iridescent creamy-white below. Metamorphosis can occur within the same breeding season or tadpoles may overwinter to metamorphose the next summer.

== Habitat and distribution ==
Green frogs are associated with bodies of water and have been found in a variety of habitats, living at the margins of shallow freshwater ponds, road-side ditches, lakes, swamps, and streams, and of vernal pools and other temporary bodies of water though less so than other frogs. They maintain small home ranges around these water sources and spend about a third of their time foraging for resources (especially in regions of abundant leaf litter and dense vegetation), returning to the water for refuge. Their habitat has also been impacted by human interaction via the development of roads, buildings, and other infrastructure and agriculture which involves the destruction of their habitat. However, if there is abundant and quality habitat nearby, green frogs have the capability to flee from deforestation and are also somewhat tolerant of said destruction. When attempting to flee from the destruction of their habitat, Green frogs tend to move primarily among three distinct types of aquatic habitats: ephemeral wetland, stream, and swamp. Additionally, green frogs select for increased soil moisture, fine woody debris, and fewer trees with water cover being the most important factor emphasizing the fact that they tend to inhabit areas near water and with open environments in order to survive.

The green frog is a widespread species native to North America, mainly occurring throughout eastern North America from the St. Lawrence River Valley in southeastern Canada to Northern Florida and Eastern Texas.

== Habitat loss ==
Due to increasing destruction of their habitat, deforestation, climate change, diseases, and chemical contaminants, amphibian population decline and extinctions may be as high as 211 times the background extinction rate. Both water and air temperatures play a major role in timing and rates of breeding, larval development, time-to-metamorphosis, size-at-metamorphosis, growth, and physiological parameters. There is experimental data present that details how organisms are more sensitive to contaminants when there is variation in temperature, which explains how chemical contamination can greatly impact the development of these frogs. Chloride in particular affects the development of the Green Frog. Vast exposure to chloride can result in many larvae having broken tails, swollen body cavities, a loss of pigment, and behavioral abnormalities. As the temperature increased in the environment, the frogs had lower time-to-mortality and significantly higher hazard when compared to the controls. This shows how temperature directly affects sensitivity to chemicals and thereby the development of the Green Frog by making their habitat more dangerous. According to the Maryland Biological Stream Survey, stormwater ponds which are a main example of a breeding habitat in Maryland can experience chloride concentrations of up to 3250 mg/L, which shows how there are several factors within their habitat affecting the survival rate of these frogs. Various herbicides and pesticides also can harm these frogs due to their permeable skin.

== Diet ==
Green frogs will attempt to eat any mouth-sized animal they can capture, including insects, spiders, fish, crayfish, shrimp, other frogs, tadpoles, small snakes, slugs, and snails. Green frogs practice "sit and wait" hunting and therefore eat whatever comes within reach. Tadpoles will eat nearly anything organic, including diatoms, algae, and tiny amounts of small animals such as zooplankton (copepods and cladocerans).

== Reproduction ==
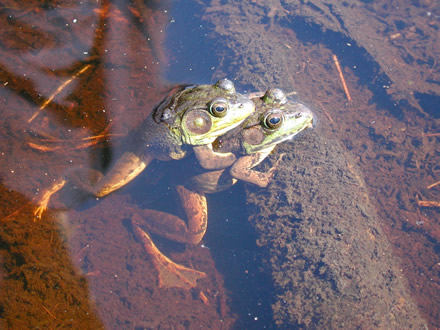
Green frog pair in amplexus: Note large tympanum of male, on top, and small tympanum of the female

Males become sexually mature at one year, females may mature in either two or three years. Males will establish breeding territories and maintain them throughout the entirety of the breeding period, with the season occurring from spring through summer, with variations depending on location and temperature. There is a strong positive correlation between temperature and detection. During this breeding period, an egg clutch consisting of 1000 to 7000 eggs is laid in surface films about 15–30 cm in diameter and are attached to vegetation in shallow water in order to protect the eggs from predators. Females may sometimes lay two clutches of eggs in a single season, with their size reaching a maximum of 98–105 mm. Females who are ready to mate typically enter into male territories and assumed a low posture to approach resident males very slowly. Once close, the male my clasp the female in amplexus, but if the female is not clasped, she will eventually swim to another territory. Females tend to ignore noncalling males and satellite males were not observed attempting to intercept females approaching calling males. Egg masses are primarily deposited in male territories.

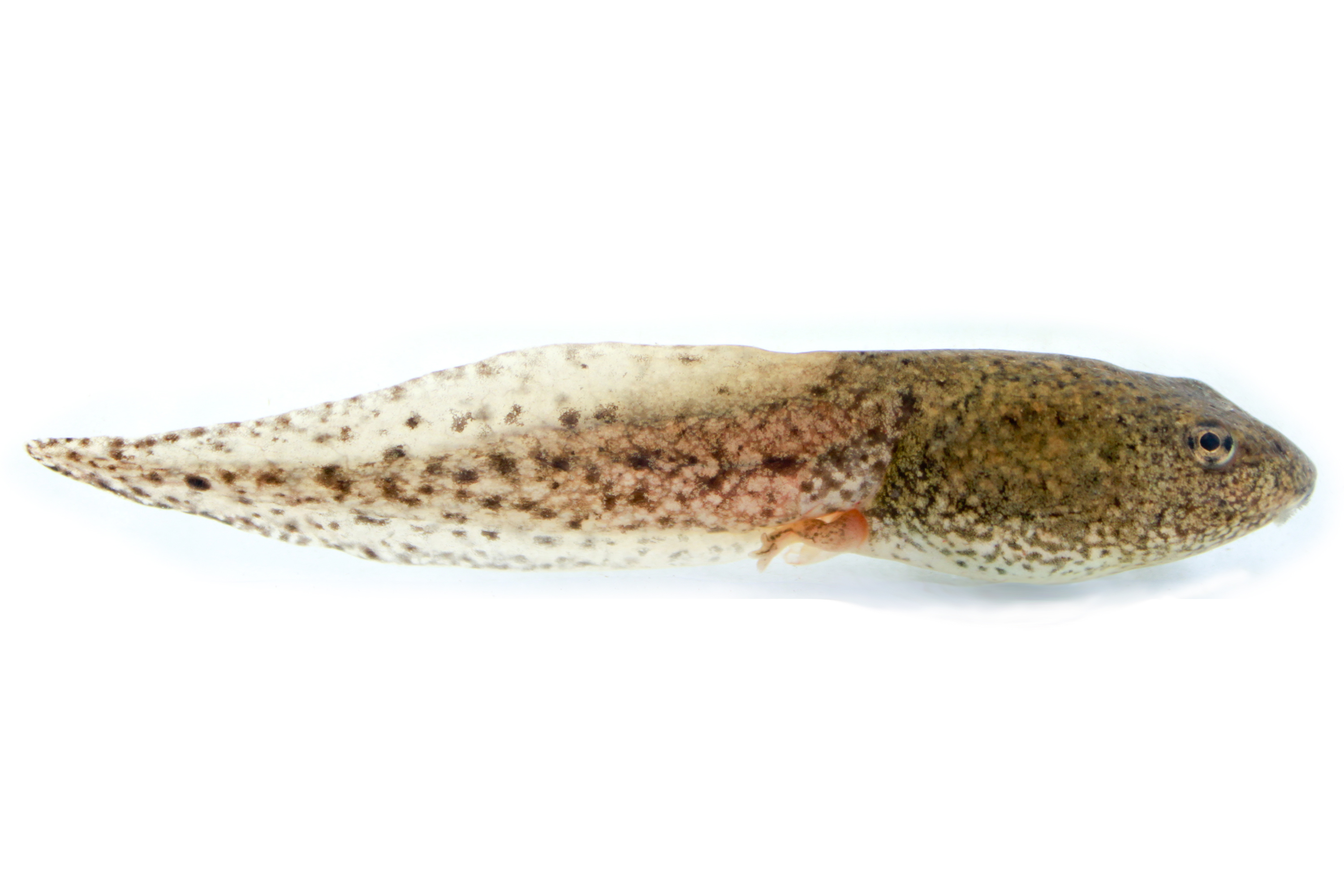
Tadpole

Research shows that wild green frogs, both living in contaminated suburban backyard ponds and also in relatively pristine forested ponds, can switch sexes. This sex reversal appears to be a natural condition but it is currently unknown whether these wild sex-reversed green frogs are able to breed.

After the eggs are deposited, development begins to occur. The typical larval life of green frogs is between 70 and 360 days depending on the time of year in which the eggs were laid. The season of growth in adult frogs (where snout-to-vent measurements increased the most) is primarily between mid-May and mid-September. This mainly correlates with the mean monthly temperature and the amount of time that the temperature is favorable for feeding. Sexual maturity is reached about a year after metamorphosis. However, frogs do not become sexually active until the year after sexual maturity is attained. There is no sexual dimorphism in size in the fully mature frog.

=== Home range and territoriality ===
Territoriality of male frogs has been studied using experimental pools. Territory defense behaviors included aggressive behaviors such as chases, jump attacks, and wrestling. Male frogs were only observed to be territorial during the breeding seasons. Male green frogs often establish their territories near to shore. Density of cover foliage impacts territory size. In denser areas, males defend smaller territories while in more open areas, territories defended were larger. Many males occupy multiple territories during a breeding season and will visit each site 2 or 3 times. Residency at each sight tends to last one week or less, although one site tends to be favored and occupied for a longer period. Larger body size positively correlates with length of residency period.

Males who do not have their own territory may inhabit the territories of resident males and are referred to as "satellite males." Such satellite males tend to sit with a low posture with only their eyes and tops of their heads exposed above the water. However, in the absence of the resident male, a satellite males may assume the vacant site. However, satellite males who try to force out resident males are usually not successful. In cases where another male ousts a resident male aggressive, the former resident male tends to remain behind as a satellite male. Resident males only tend to get displaced by smaller males if they have become weak and emaciated. At the end of the breeding season, territorial defense terminates.

== Behavior ==
=== Vocalizations ===
To emphasize their territory during breeding season, males advertise their positions with vocalizations and exhibit aggressive behavior including chases and jump attacks. Males have four main vocalizations used to maintain their territories. The first type of call is the advertisement call, which functions to advertise a male's position to other males and to prospective mates. The distinctive call sounds like a plucked loose banjo string, usually given as a single note, but sometimes repeated. The dominant frequency of the advertisement call has been found to be negatively correlated with snout vent length (SVL). Many studies show that aggressive behavior is evoked from other male frogs in response to this call.

The second type of call is similar to the first but is more urgent. This call is used in response to a disturbance in the territory. It is thought to demonstrate dominance because it is often given by the winners of wrestling bouts when chasing the losers out of their territories.

The third type of call is often directed towards others in an agonistic encounter. It is usually the first call produced when a frog's territory has been invaded and while the male approaches the intruder. Consequently, this call antagonizes more aggressive behavior since there were often physical bouts between the intruder and owner of the territory. This is different from the second type of call, because the second call serves as more of a warning call while this call meant that violence would follow.

Finally, the fourth type of call is produced during wrestling bouts and given by the male that is winning the fight. Additionally, there is also a fifth call type that both males and females use which serves as a release call when an individual is clasped by another frog. For males, it was released when they were losing wrestling bouts, while for females, it was released both when non-gravid females were being clasped by males and when females were ready to be released after completing oviposition. Both the females and losing males releasing the same call emphasizes the fact that males without territory or males who lost to other males are seen as weaker and subordinate in this species.

=== Movement and posture ===
Males often move from territory to territory since they occupy several different territories to increase their mating appeal to females. Males that do not have a territory for the breeding season often move into other males' territory and become satellite males. Satellite males use these new territories to intercept females who are responding to the call of territory owners, demonstrating a type of sexual coercion. In contrast, females did not exhibit any particularly aggressive interactions since they normally spent the day hiding in vegetation while at night they foraged for resources.

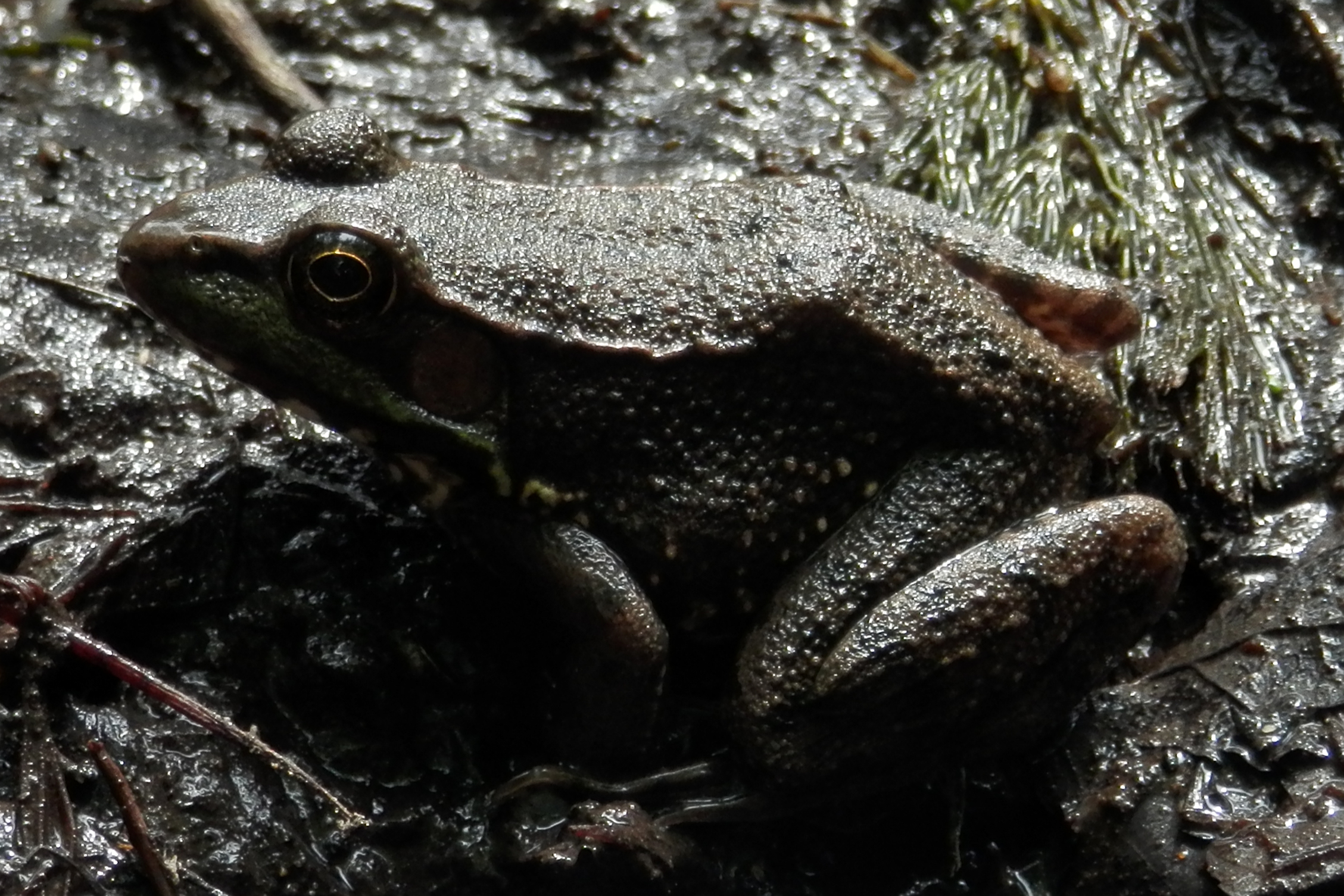
Green Frog

Males demonstrating territorial behavior often presented different postures emphasizing different aspects of their physical appearance when compared to satellite males. Territorial males maintain a high posture, with the lungs inflated and only the lower parts of the limbs under water. These frogs tilt their head at a certain angle to allow their bright yellow throat to be exposed which is an act of presenting dominance and marking their own territory. They maintain this posture throughout the entire day (calling time or not). In contrast, satellite males assume a low posture with only the top of the head and eyes above the water's surface. Since their main focus is to steal the territory from the dominant male when he leaves to go to his other territories, the satellite males assume a more sneaky position since they will often stalk the resident male and move cautiously through the territory. This low position also decreases the chances of the satellite male being attacked by the resident male since they were seen as being subordinate/below the resident male.

== Predation and enemies ==
Due to their environment being so dependent on water, pathogens, predators, and other deadly problems often trouble the Green Frog. The fungal pathogen Batrachochytrium dendrobatidis (Bd) has been involved with the decline of several amphibian populations, one being the Lithobates clamitans. Bd kills amphibians by interfering with external water exchange, which causes an imbalance with ion exchange, thereby leading to heart failure. An important factor in mediating the interaction between amphibians and Bd is temperature. If the temperature is beyond 30 degrees Celsius, then Bd will not survive, while the optimal temperature for Bd is 17-23 degrees Celsius. Furthermore, seasonal temperature variation can cause differences in immunity to this pathogen. For the Green Frog species, the prevalence of Bd was significantly higher in closed canopy streams, while infection intensities were higher in emergent wetlands. This could be due to prevalence being directly related to lower temperature habitats which are present in the canopy streams.

Green Frogs historically have several types of predators. Firstly, their eggs are eaten by turtles, tadpoles are eaten by diving beetles, giant water bugs, and water scorpions. They are also preyed upon by ducks, herons, and crows.

== Anti-predatory measures ==
Green Frogs have also developed certain anti-predatory measures in order to survive. One example of an anti-predatory measure developed by several different organisms is the use of chemical cues. Chemicals are released by predators and prey throughout the entire duration of a predation event thereby allowing the prey to detect the presence of predators through chemicals subconsciously released by the predators. Several research studies have demonstrated that aquatic prey tend to avoid chemical cues as their form of an anti-predatory measure. Specifically for the tadpoles of the Green Frog, they reacted with spatial anti-predator behavior (distancing themselves from the chemical cues), when only exposed to both Anax kairomones and conspecific alarm cues together. Experimenters hypothesize that presence of both of these cues are needed because the costs of fleeing their habitat may result in a massive loss of foraging opportunities. If they choose to respond to a certain cue that is not strong or reliable, then they are losing a vast amount of resources. Thus, when they choose to demonstrate spatial avoidance, there must be multiple chemical cues present in order for the benefits to outweigh the risks.

Typically, when encountering predators, animals tend to develop anti-predator traits in order to promote reproductive success. Consequently, these traits will be passed down throughout generations until the predator develops a new trait to counteract this measure thereby creating an arms race between the predator and the prey. Another consequence of this type of evolution is subsets of a species developing new traits due to the different exposure of predators due to their different environments (diverging evolution). Regarding the Bronze Frog (which is a subspecies of the Green Frog), when present in ponds inhabited by invertebrate predators, the tadpoles may develop small bodies and large tail muscles in order to increase fast-start locomotor performance to escape from their predators. Consequently, the presence of fish and invertebrate predators plays a large role in size, shape, and swimming performance of the tadpoles of the Green Frog. As a result, this can lead to some morphological differences between the subspecies within the Green Frog, which highlights divergent natural selection and adaptive phenotypic plasticity.
