= St. Marks River =

River in Florida, United States

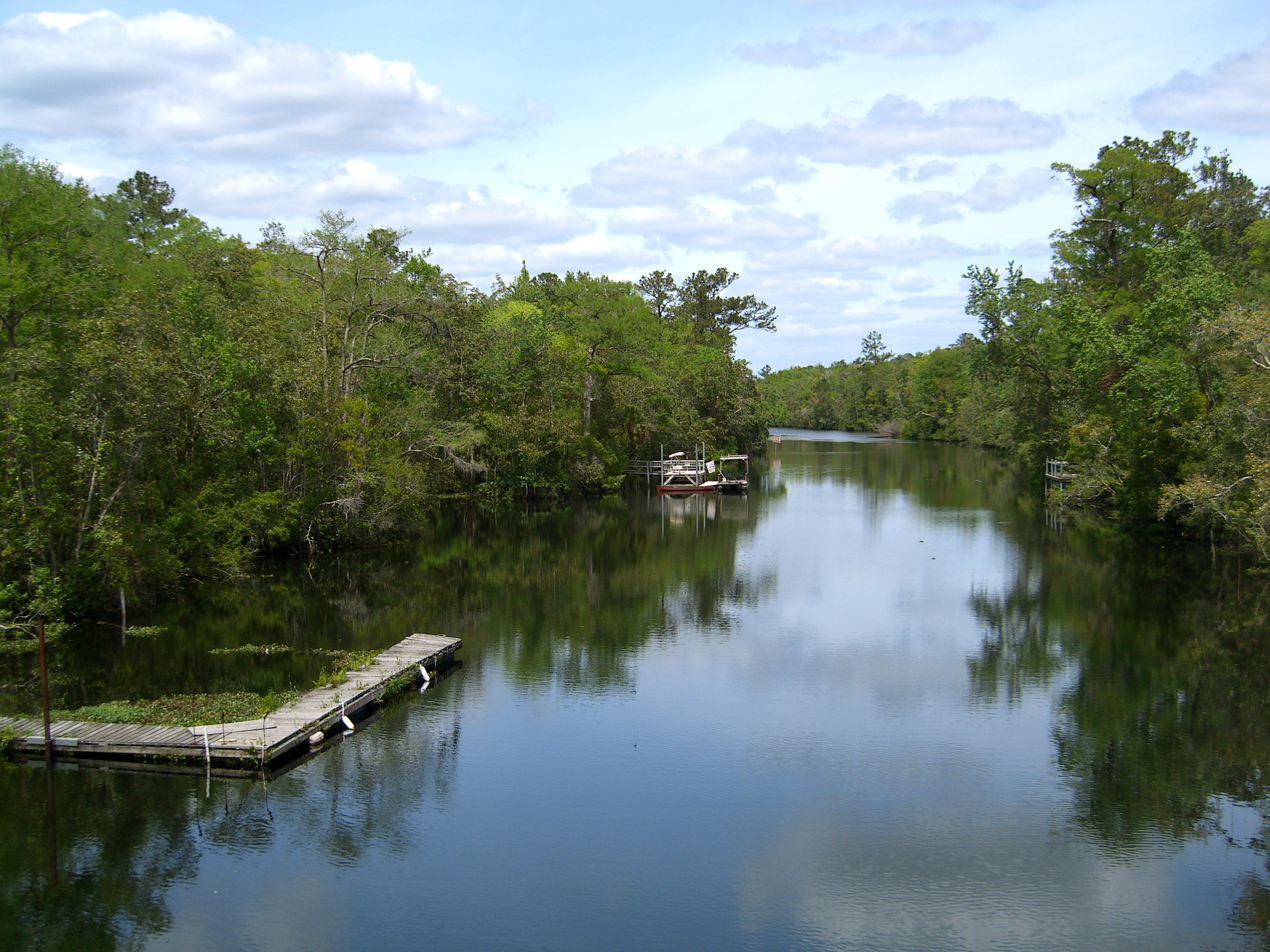
- St. Marks River viewed from U.S. Highway 98.

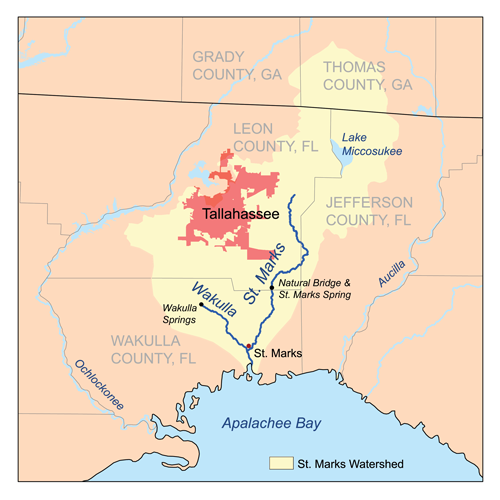
- St. Marks River watershed

Location
- Country: United States
- State: Florida
- Counties: Leon, Jefferson, Wakulla
- District: NWFWMD

Physical characteristics
- Source: Tallahassee Hills
  - location: Capitola, Florida
  - coordinates: 30°28′40″N 84°06′01″W
- Mouth: Apalachee Bay
  - location: Port Leon, Florida
  - coordinates: 30°4′53″N 84°11′31″W
- Length: 36 mi (58 km)
- Basin size: 1,150 sq mi (3,000 km^{2})
- Discharge
  - average: 1,122 cu ft/s (31.8 m^{3}/s)
- Discharge
  - location: St. Marks River Rise
  - average: 433 cu ft/s (12.3 m^{3}/s)

Basin features
- Tributaries
  - left: East River
  - right: Lafayette Creek, Wakulla River

The St. Marks River is a river in the Big Bend region of Florida. It has been classified by the Florida Department of Environmental Protection as an Outstanding Florida Water, and is the easternmost river within the Northwest Florida Water Management District.

The St. Marks River begins in eastern Leon County, Florida and flows 36 miles (58 km) through Leon and Wakulla counties into Apalachee Bay, an arm of the Gulf of Mexico. It has a drainage basin of 1,150 square miles (3,000 km^{2}) in size. It has one significant tributary, the Wakulla River.

A few miles south of its source the St. Marks passes under a natural bridge at Natural Bridge Battlefield Historic State Park and then disappears underground to become a subterranean river for about one-half mile. The river emerges at the St. Marks River Rise, a first magnitude spring with a discharge of 433cf/s, to pass over a stretch of rocks forming rapids.

The incorporated town of St. Marks is located at the juncture of the Wakulla and St. Marks Rivers. To the north is the community of Newport. Between St. Marks and Newport is a small industrial area serviced by barge.

The San Marcos de Apalache Historic State Park and St. Marks lighthouse are located near the mouth of the river, while the City of Tallahassee's Sam O. Purdom Generating Station is located on the river in St. Marks.

== List of crossings ==
Crossing	Carries	Image	Location	Coordinates
Headwaters				30°28′40″N 84°06′01″W
	Driveways on Faye Way			30°28′35″N 84°06′02″W
	Valentine Road			30°28′21″N 84°06′04″W
	CR 1568; Buck Lake Road			30°27′49″N 84°06′25″W
rail bridge	CSX Transportation		Capitola	30°26′39″N 84°06′12″W
	CR 1540; Capitola Road		Capitola	30°26′36″N 84°06′11″W
Confluence with Lafayette Creek				30°25′40″N 84°06′17″W
	US 27; Perry Highway			30°25′15″N 84°06′05″W
	CR 259; Tram Road		Cody	30°21′43″N 84°03′39″W
ford	private road			30°19′42″N 84°05′21″W
	CR 2192; Natural Bridge Road		Natural Bridge Battlefield State Park	30°17′03″N 84°09′02″W
natural bridge				30°16′59″N 84°09′03″W
George Nesmith Bridge	US 98; Coastal Highway		Newport	30°11′56″N 84°10′41″W
Confluence with Wakulla River			St. Marks	30°08′58″N 84°12′40″W
Confluence with East River				30°05′19″N 84°10′44″W
Mouth				30°04′53″N 84°11′31″W
