= Backplate and wing =

Type of back-mount scuba harness

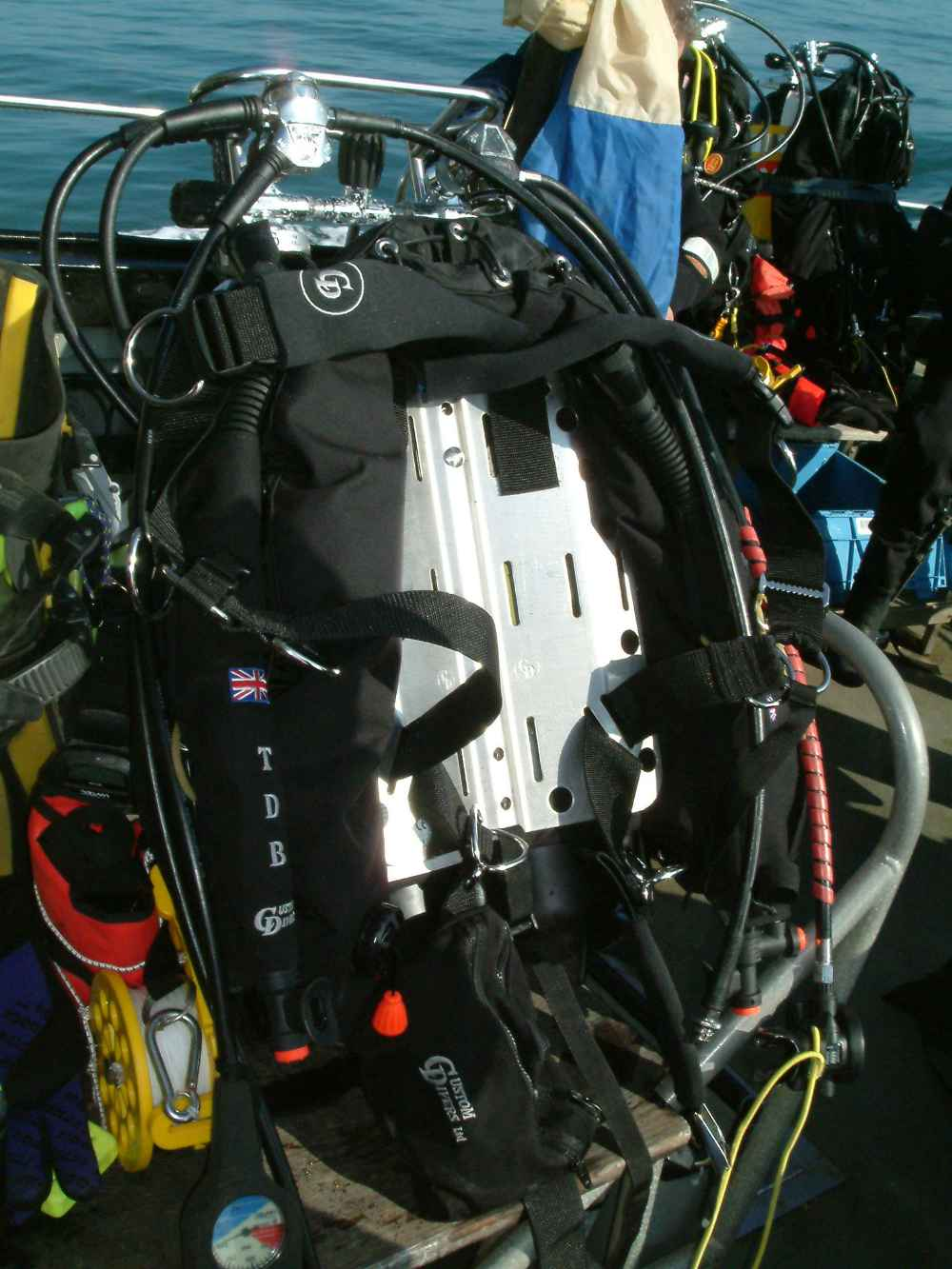
- A stainless steel backplate, wing and manifolded twinset
- Uses: Scuba harness and buoyancy compensator
- Related items: Buoyancy compensator (diving)

A backplate and wing (often abbreviated as BP&W or BP/W) is a type of scuba harness with an attached buoyancy compensation device (BCD) which can be used to establish neutral buoyancy underwater and positive buoyancy at the surface.

However, unlike most other BCDs, the backplate and wing is a modular system, in that it consists of separable components. The core components of this system are:

- The backplate, a plate, usually made from stainless steel, sometimes aluminium or carbon fibre composite, which is held against the diver's back by the harness, and to which the diver's primary cylinder or cylinders are attached.
- A harness, which attaches the system to the diver, and may support other accessories.
- An inflatable buoyancy bladder known as a wing, between the backplate and the cylinder(s), used for adjusting the buoyancy of the diver when in the water.
- A set of cambands or cylinder bands, to hold the cylinder(s) in place.

== Function ==
The backplate and wing combination is a modular form of scuba harness and back mounted buoyancy compensator used by scuba divers to support the diving cylinder and buoyancy compensator bladder on the diver's back. It also provides attachment points for accessory equipment such as auxiliary scuba sets for decompression or bailout, lights, cutting tool and guideline reel.

== Configuration ==
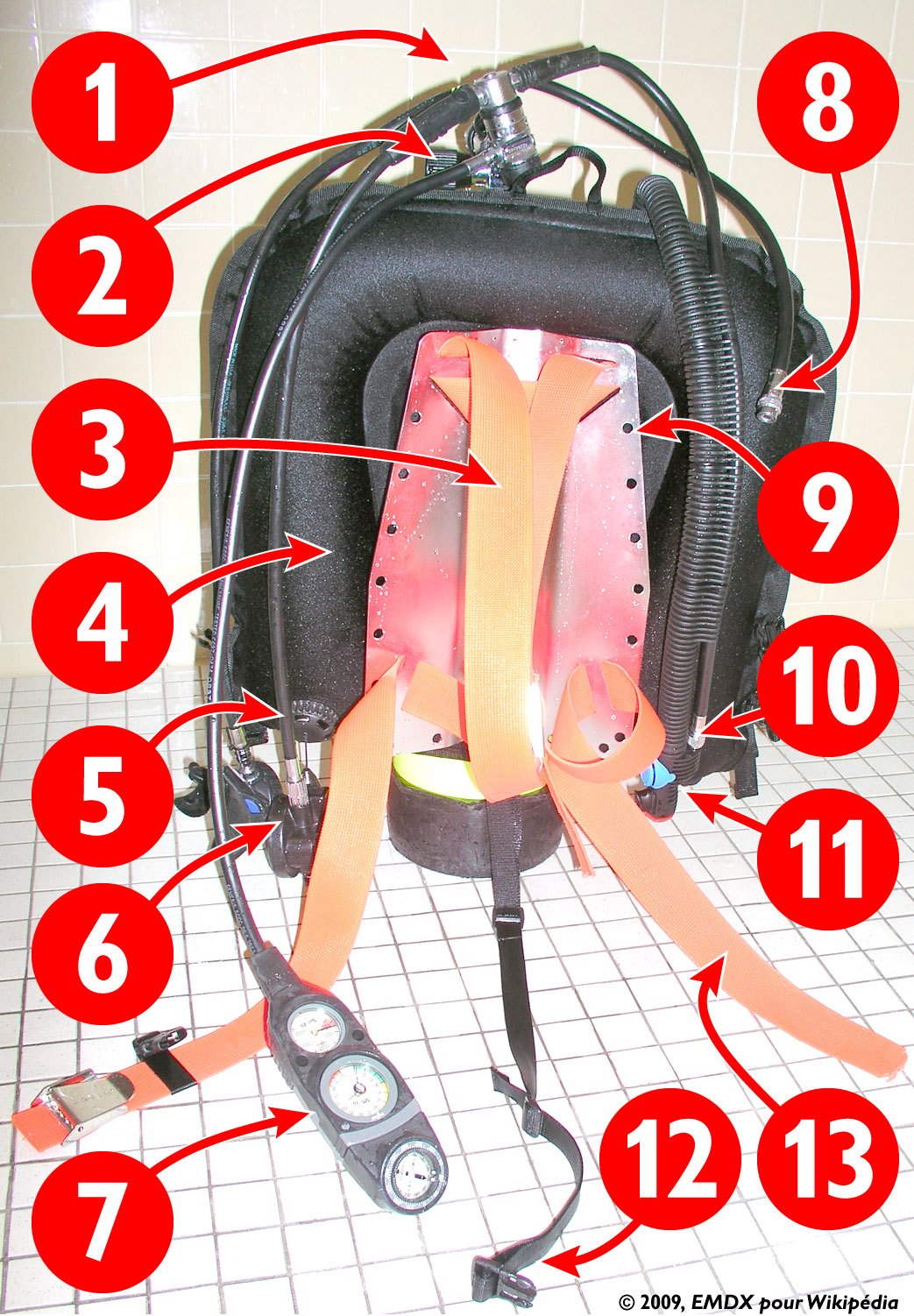
Backplate with wing style BC, scuba set, and harness: 1. Regulator first stage; 2. Cylinder valve; 3. Shoulder straps; 4. Buoyancy compensator bladder; 5. Relief and bottom manual dump valve; 6. Regulator second stages (with "octopus"); 7. Console (pressure gauge, depth gauge & compass); 8. Dry-suit inflator hose; 9. Backplate; 10. BC inflator hose; 11. Oral inflation mouthpiece and manual dump valve; 12. Crotch strap; 13. Waist strap

=== Harness ===
The basic harness comprises two lengths of 2 in (51 mm) webbing: One is woven through the slots in the backplate to form closed shoulder loops and an open waist strap, with a weightbelt-type lever action buckle for securing the waist strap.

The second section of webbing forms a crotch strap, running from the bottom of the backplate, between the diver's legs, and up to the waist strap, which would be passed through a loop at the front end of the crotch strap. This harness is sometimes referred to as a one-piece harness, due to the shoulder and waist straps being made from a single piece of webbing.

The harness is usually fitted with stainless steel D-rings secured by stainless steel "sliders", small slotted plates which hold their position by friction. A loop of elastic cord is normally attached at the same place as the left shoulder D-ring, to secure the wing's inflator hose.

This arrangement is extremely rugged, reliable and hard-wearing, and may be adjusted to fit different builds of diver by shortening the webbing used to tighten the harness, or installing a new longer section of webbing to loosen the harness. Once adjusted, some flexibility is still allowed by positioning the buckle, which can change the effective length of the waist strap depending on where it is secured.

The harness webbing can be replaced by the user with no special tools when the webbing wears through or is damaged, and other components can be easily replaced. This makes this style of harness very economical over the long term.

==== Harness accessories ====
- D-rings or a functional equivalent are usually fitted to the waistbelt, shoulder straps and crotch strap to secure stage cylinders, additional equipment, and clipping off demand valves, light heads, and submersible pressure gauges which are not currently being used. The number and position of these D-rings can be adjusted by the user, but there are a few positions which have become fairly standard.
  - Left and right shoulder strap at roughly the height of the collar bone in front.
  - Left hip just forward of the backplate.
  - Crotch strap at the back and front. The front one is used for a tow-line when scootering
- Weight holders are available for integrated weight systems which can be slid over the waist belt.
- Canister lights can be carried on the waist belt. The standard position is on the right side.
- A small diver's knife or cutting tool is commonly carried on the left side alongside the buckle.
- Backup lights are generally clipped to the shoulder D-rings and held against the shoulder straps by rubber bands cut from bicycle inner tubes. Other methods are possible, but the inner tubes work and are easily replaced when they wear out.

Many variations to this basic harness are used, and these may include:

- Differing number or positioning of D-rings.
- Shoulder straps that cross behind the diver's neck.
- No crotch strap.
- An additional chest strap, which crosses the diver's sternum.
- For divers who find it difficult to get the harness on or off, a buckle may be fitted to one or both of the shoulder straps. The left shoulder strap is particularly convenient because this is the side where most dry suits have the auto-dump valve, which tends to snag on the harness.
- Neoprene padding tubes may be used over the shoulder straps for comfort.

Some manufacturers offer alternative harnesses, often marketed as "deluxe" options, which may include the above variations.

Omitting the buoyancy bladder reduces the setup to a plain backpack harness if the breathing set needs to be used on land. However, the standard bent sheet-metal backplate is ergonomically unsuited to this function.

=== Backplate ===
The backplate is usually made from a single piece of stainless steel or anodised aluminium, bent along four lines to form a shallow channel running vertically down the center. The plate is about 15 inches (380 mm) long and 10 inches (250 mm) wide. There are two slots near each of the shoulders and hips, where the harness passes through, and another slot at the bottom of the plate where the crotch strap attaches. There is also one or more pairs of holes in the channel to be used for cylinder attachment; the holes of each pair are usually 11 inches apart.

A variation on this design uses another two parallel bends to form a shallow trough down the back of the central channel, which stabilises a single cylinder strapped to the centreline, with two pairs of slots for a pair of cambands..

Steel backplates are commonly used when the buoyancy of the diver's other equipment (primarily cylinders and exposure protection) would need a weightbelt, as the negative buoyancy of the steel plate can replace some of this weight. Aluminium backplates are commonly used when the diver would not require a weightbelt (such as when wearing heavy steel cylinders) or when the mass of the backplate must be kept low for air travel. Backplates are occasionally made from other materials, including carbon fiber reinforced plastics, titanium, and ABS plastic.

Lightweight versions of the backplate are available with inessential areas cut away to reduce the weight. When taken to the extreme, a single cylinder is used as the longitudinal stiffener, and the backplate is reduced to a skeletal frame at the level of the waist belt, which stabilizes the cylinder against rolling on the diver's back.

Backplate weights tend to range from around 2.5 to 5 kilograms (5.5 to 11.0 lb) for stainless steel, 1 to 1.5 kilograms (2.2 to 3.3 lb) for aluminium and 0.5 to 1 kilogram (1.1 to 2.2 lb) for lighter materials.

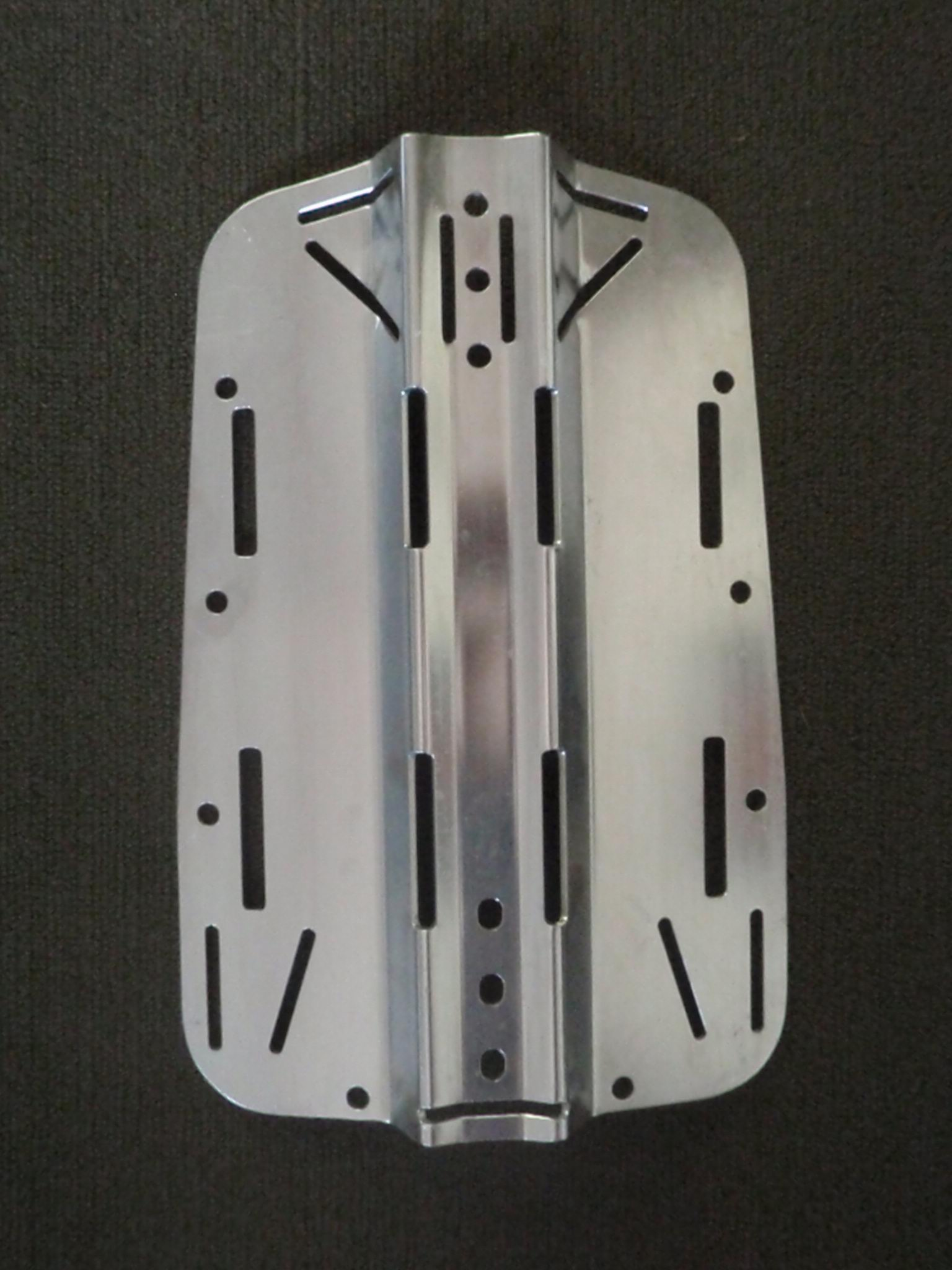
A stainless steel backplate with "M"-section centre channel

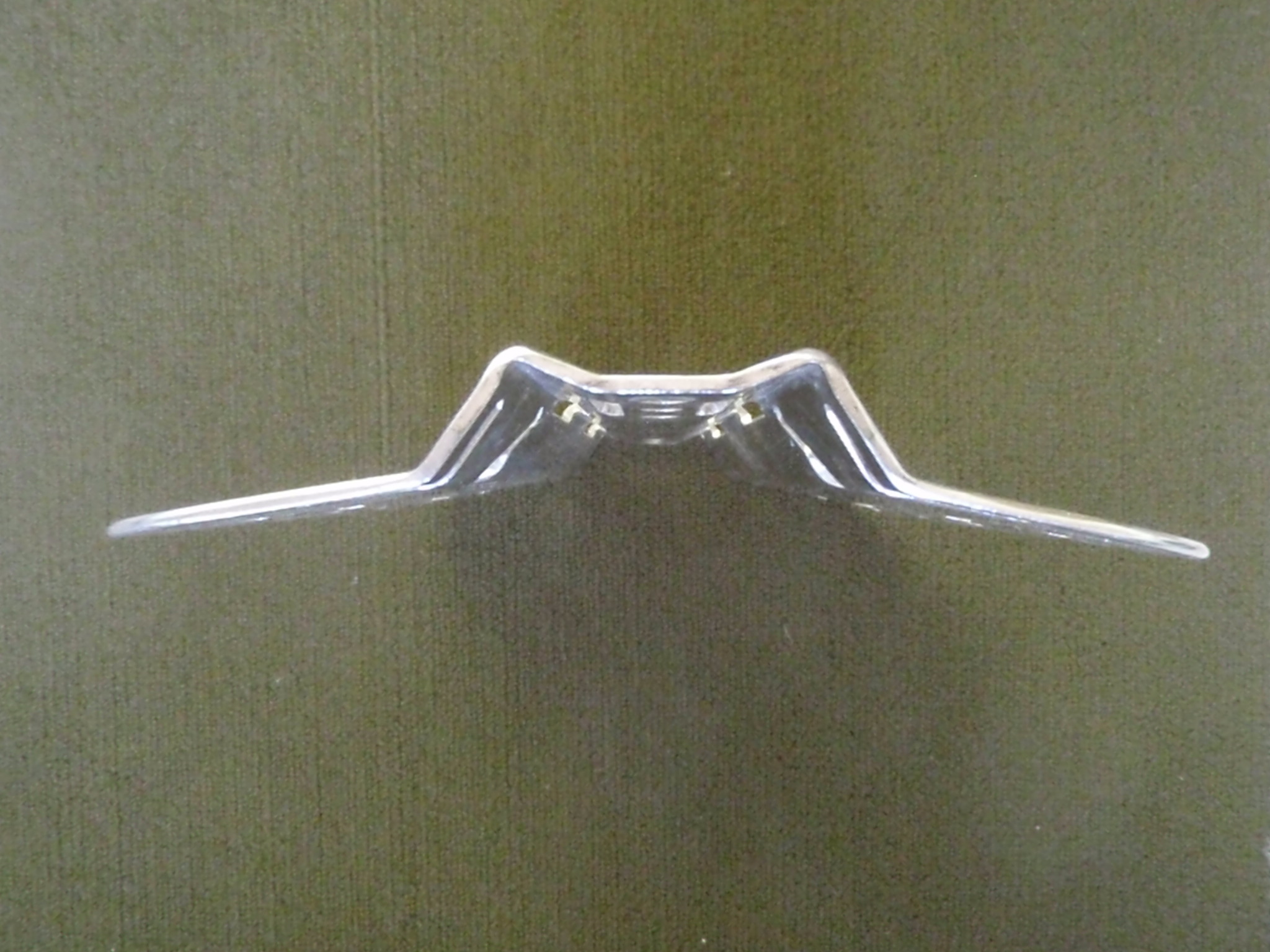
End view of a backplate showing the "M"-section of the central channel

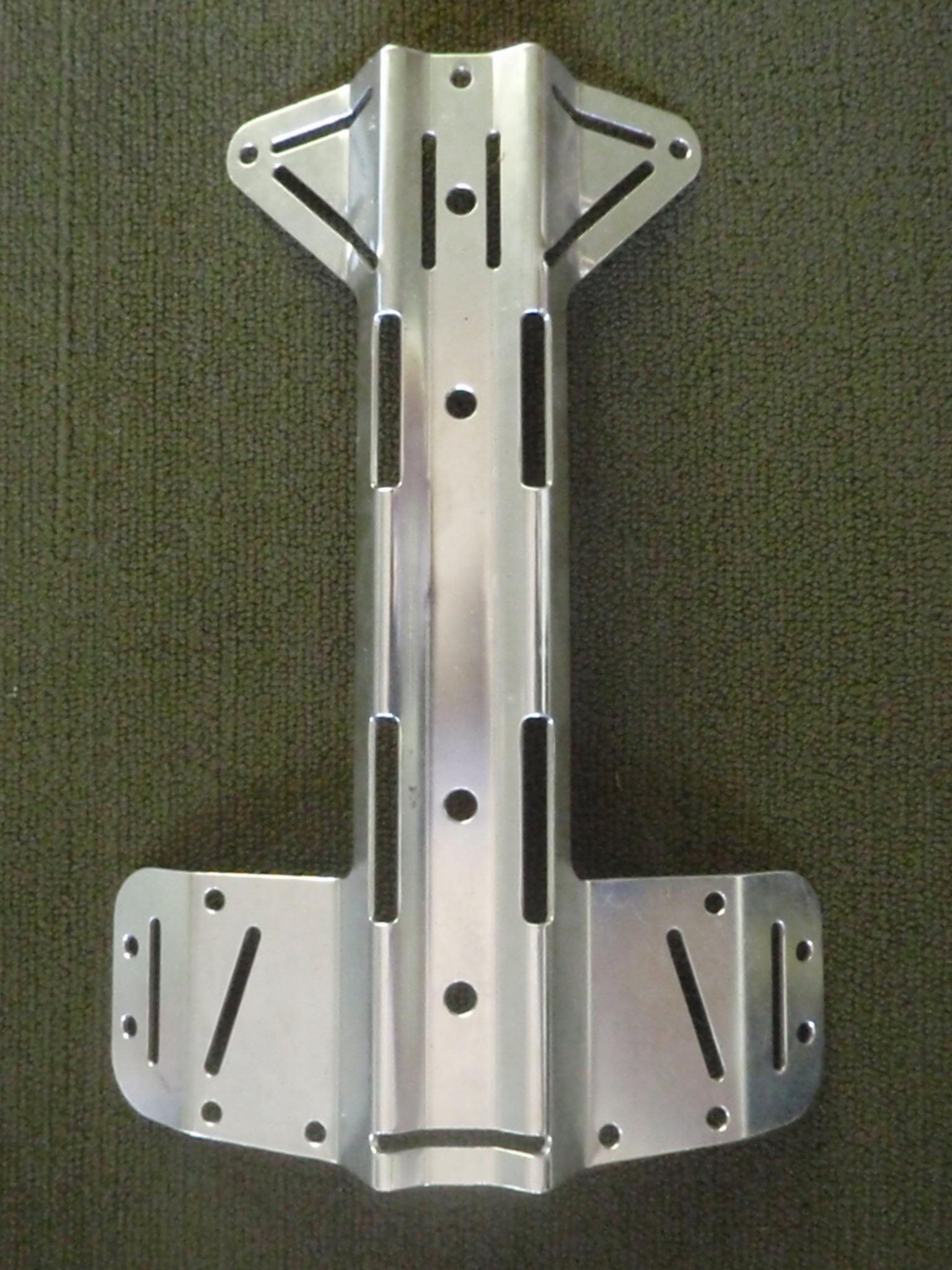
Lightweight backplate with non-essential plating cut away to reduce mass

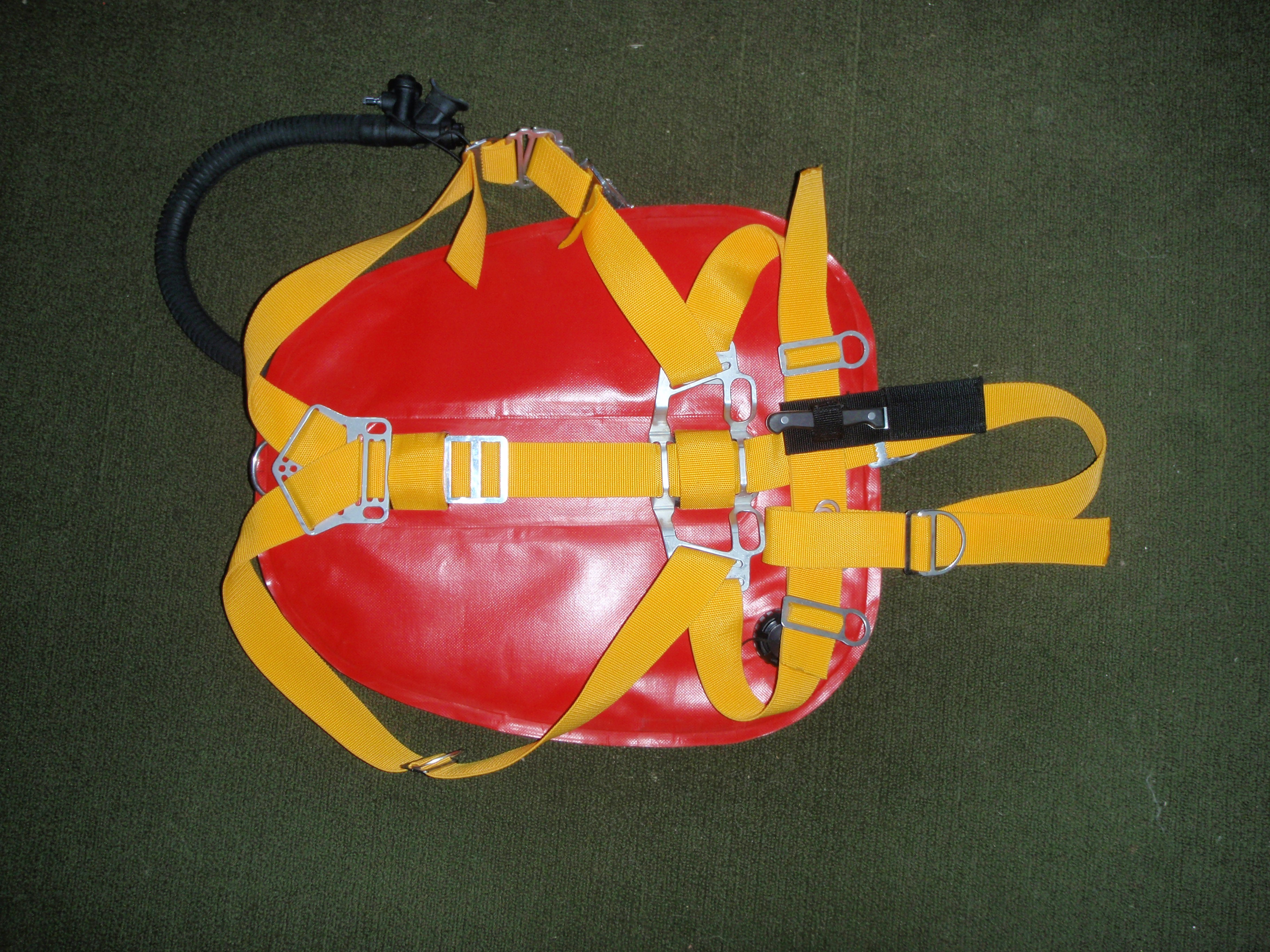
Lightweight travel diving harness with wing buoyancy compensator and minimal backplate suitable for single back mount cylinder or side mount cylinders - front view.

=== Wing ===
The wing is an inflatable buoyancy bladder, similar to that in other varieties of BCD, except that it is not in or permanently attached to the harness part of a BCD. As with other BCDs, wings have an inflation valve on a corrugated hose, dump valve, and over pressure valve. Wings are usually oval (annular, doughnut or toroidal) or U-shaped (horseshoe), and are designed to wrap slightly around the diving cylinder(s) when inflated.

Wings are usually designed to be used with either a single diving cylinder or twin cylinders, although some manufacturers make wings that they recommend for both single and twin cylinder diving. Single-cylinder wings are most commonly oval-shaped and are relatively narrow, and twin-cylinder wings are more likely to be U-shaped and are wider.

Wings are available in a wide range of volumes, which can be described as:

- low volume, suitable for warm water where the diver does not use a high buoyancy dive suit, up to about 20 pounds (9.1 kg) lift, also sometimes called tropical wings, and used with a single cylinder.
- medium volume single tank wings, for use with more buoyant dive suits, with a buoyancy between about 20 and 30 pounds (9.1 and 13.6 kg).
- high volume wings for twin tanks, with buoyancy of over about 40 pounds (18 kg).

==== Bungee wings ====
Some wings, known as bungee wings, incorporate elastic cords to constrain the wing when it is less than completely full and accelerate air dumping. These wings usually have rubber bungee cords wrapping the bladder area, but some designs use an elasticised shell or cords along a bellows fold gusset. Arguments for and against are:

- For:
  - That constricting the wing improves streamlining and ease of gas dumping.
- Against:
  - That the bungee will increase streamlining only if the wing is inappropriately large.
  - That the bungee would forcefully expel gas from the wing if there is a small puncture.
  - That the bungee creates a rough surface, increasing drag; however, in reality it is extremely unlikely that any increase in drag would be significant.
  - That drag is a minor concern, but entanglement is a real hazard; for this reason, many technical wreck and cave divers use "bungee-less" wings, as the elastic cords increase the risk of snagging.
  - That the creases caused by the cords make it more difficult to dump the last of the air, and this may encourage divers to carry more weight than is strictly necessary, thus making good trim more difficult.

Some manufacturers, such as OMS and Dive Rite make both and let the purchaser choose which style they prefer. The style which uses elastic only on the side gussets is more streamlined and smoother than the full wrap bungee style.

==== Dual bladder wings ====
Another variety, the dual bladder wing, contains a second, redundant bladder and inflation assembly, with the second bladder being intended for use if the primary bladder fails, either through a puncture, or through an inflation valve failing. Some technical divers may choose a dual bladder wing to have backup redundancy if the primary bladder fails. Detractors of this arrangement point out that if the extra bladder is inadvertently inflated, the diver may not realise that this has occurred, and it may result in an uncontrolled buoyant ascent, with a risk of fatal injury. This risk may be reduced by having only oral inflation for the backup wing, or requiring the same low pressure inflator hose to be used for both wings, and having the backup bladder inflation on the opposite side to the primary bladder. This makes it necessary to disconnect the hose and reconnect to the other bladder to use the low pressure inflator for the backup wing, and it is not possible for a leaky inflation valve to fill the backup wing without the diver's knowledge.

The wing may be a single or double skin unit. A single skin wing uses the same material for structure and holding the air, while a double skin arrangement uses an airtight bladder in a structural casing of strong but porous textile. Single skin construction is simpler, and usually uses RF welding to make the seams. These bladders are usually lighter and dry out more quickly than double skin wings, but if the bladder is punctured, a new bladder is relatively easily fitted to a double skin wing, while repair of the single skin bladder may not be practicable, depending on material and construction details, and the location and extent of the damage. Single skin wings are also easier to decontaminate, particularly if the outer surface is smooth. Single skin wings may use a bellows fold gusset to increase inflatable volume while retaining a relatively compact outline. This can reduce drag while swimming when the bladder is deflated.

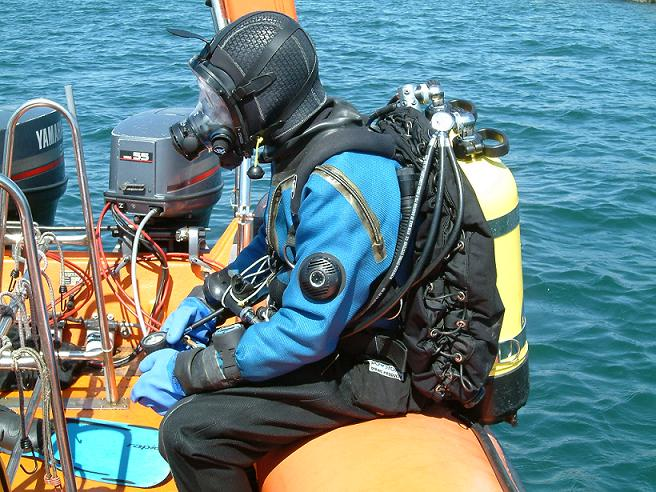
Diver wearing a bungee wing

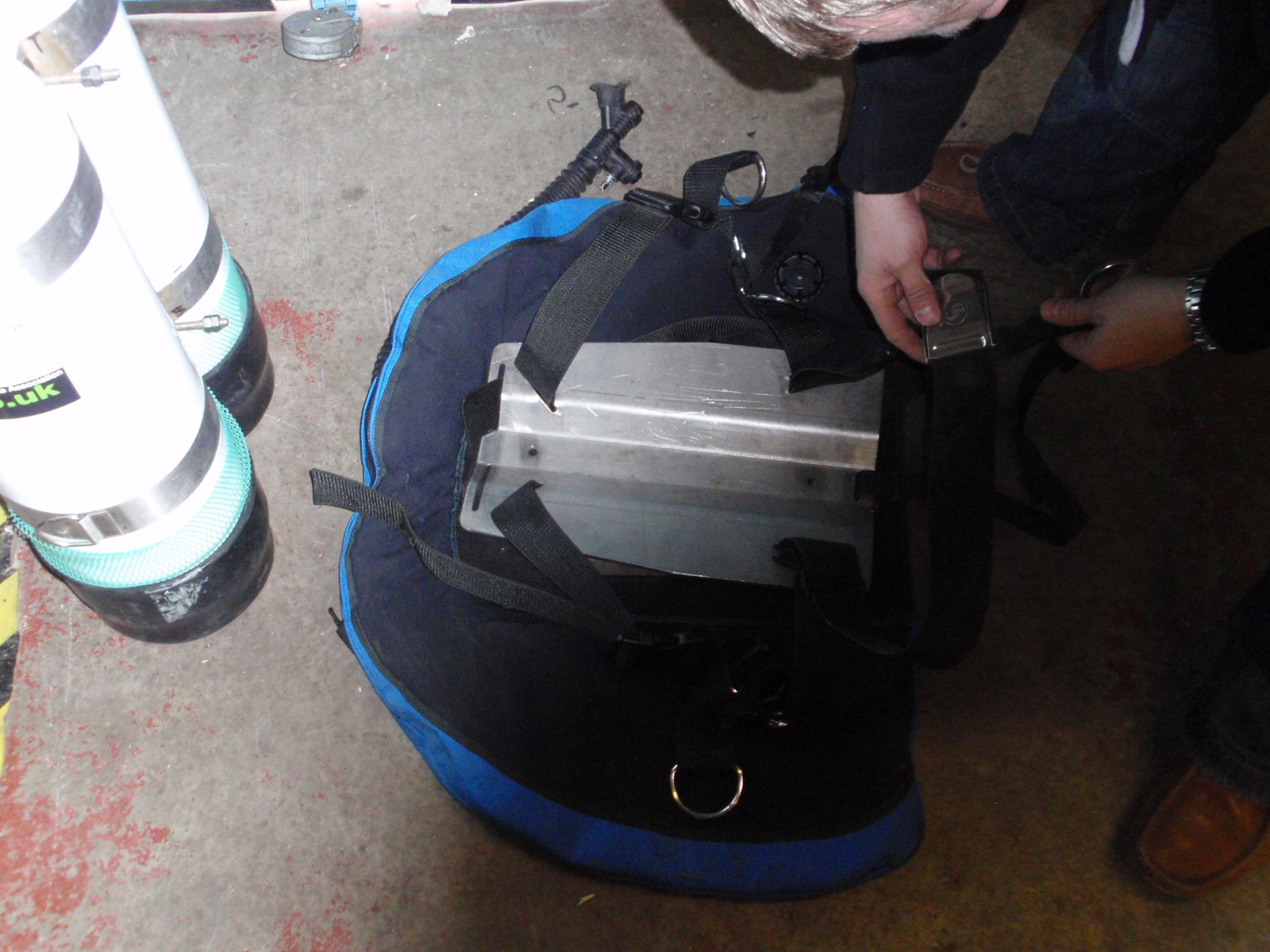
Horseshoe configuration wings for twin-cylinder set: the cylinders are fastened by 2 metal straps to the backplate with the wings between them.

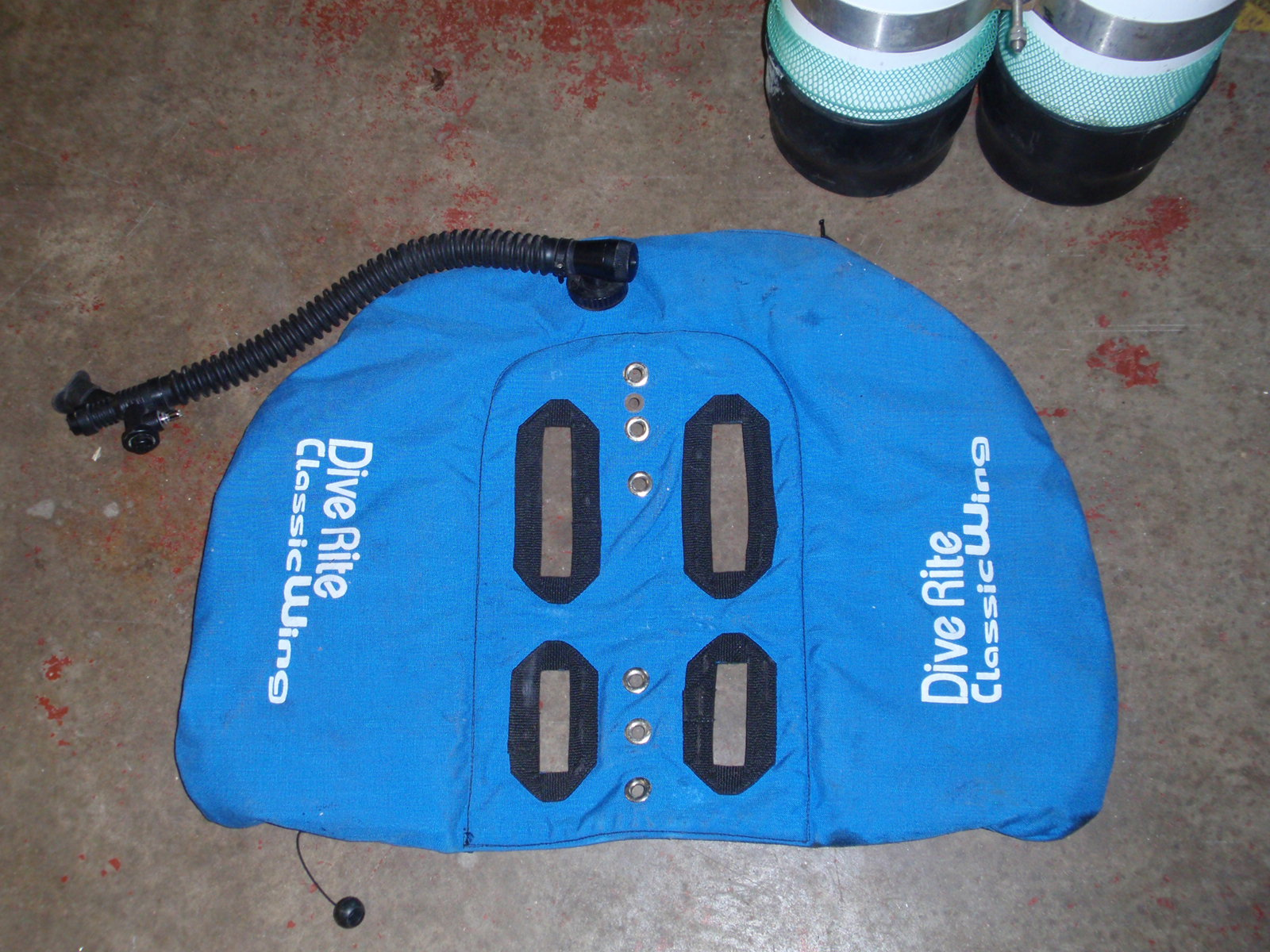
Horseshoe style wing. The two pairs of slits allow use of cambands to hold a single cylinder.

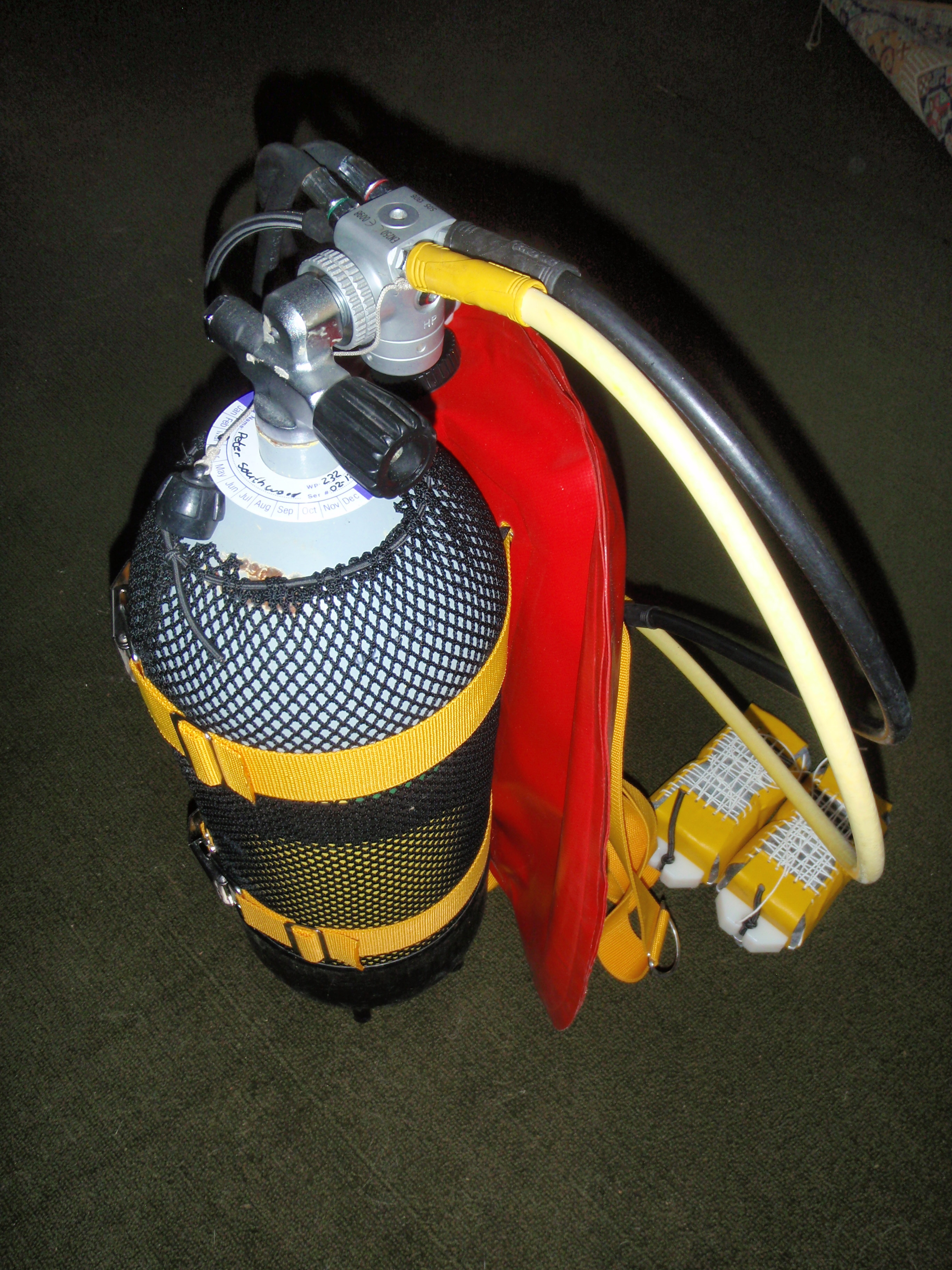
Bellows fold - deflated

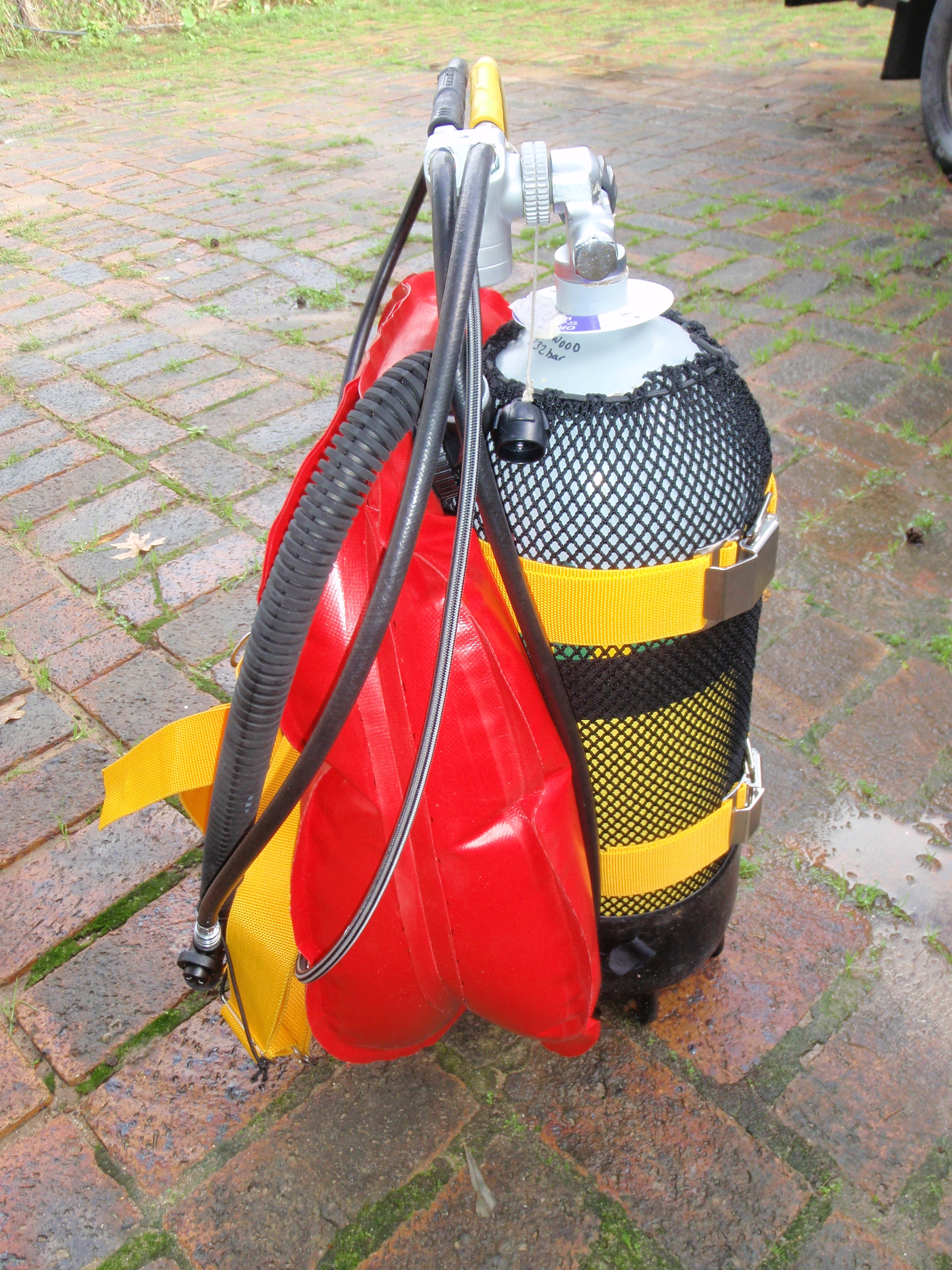
Bellows fold - fully inflated

=== Cylinder attachment ===
When a backplate is used with a single cylinder, a single tank adapter, or STA, is usually used. The STA is a small metal structure that bolts onto the backplate on the outside of the wings, contains two camstraps, and accommodates the cylinder. Use of a single tank adaptor slightly increases the profile height of the assembly and may affect the centre of gravity which may affect trim. In some cases the increase in height may be undesirable.

In some instances, the STA may be omitted, and the camstraps threaded through the wing and backplate. In these cases, the wing will contain a built-in STA in the form of two rods or pads which stabilise the cylinder, or the backplate may be made with a slight channel in the central ridge to hold the single cylinder.

Twin cylinders are usually attached to the backplate via bolts, passing through the cylinder bands, and secured by nuts in the central channel of the backplate. An alternative is to use two sets of camstraps and extra slots in the backplate and wing. This arrangement will allow convenient attachment of independent cylinders of almost any size without use of cylinder bands.

Some rebreather divers fit backplates to their rebreathers. The exact method of attachment varies between users and rebreather models, and may include modification to the rebreather or using a customised backplate. Some rebreathers are designed specifically for use with backplates.

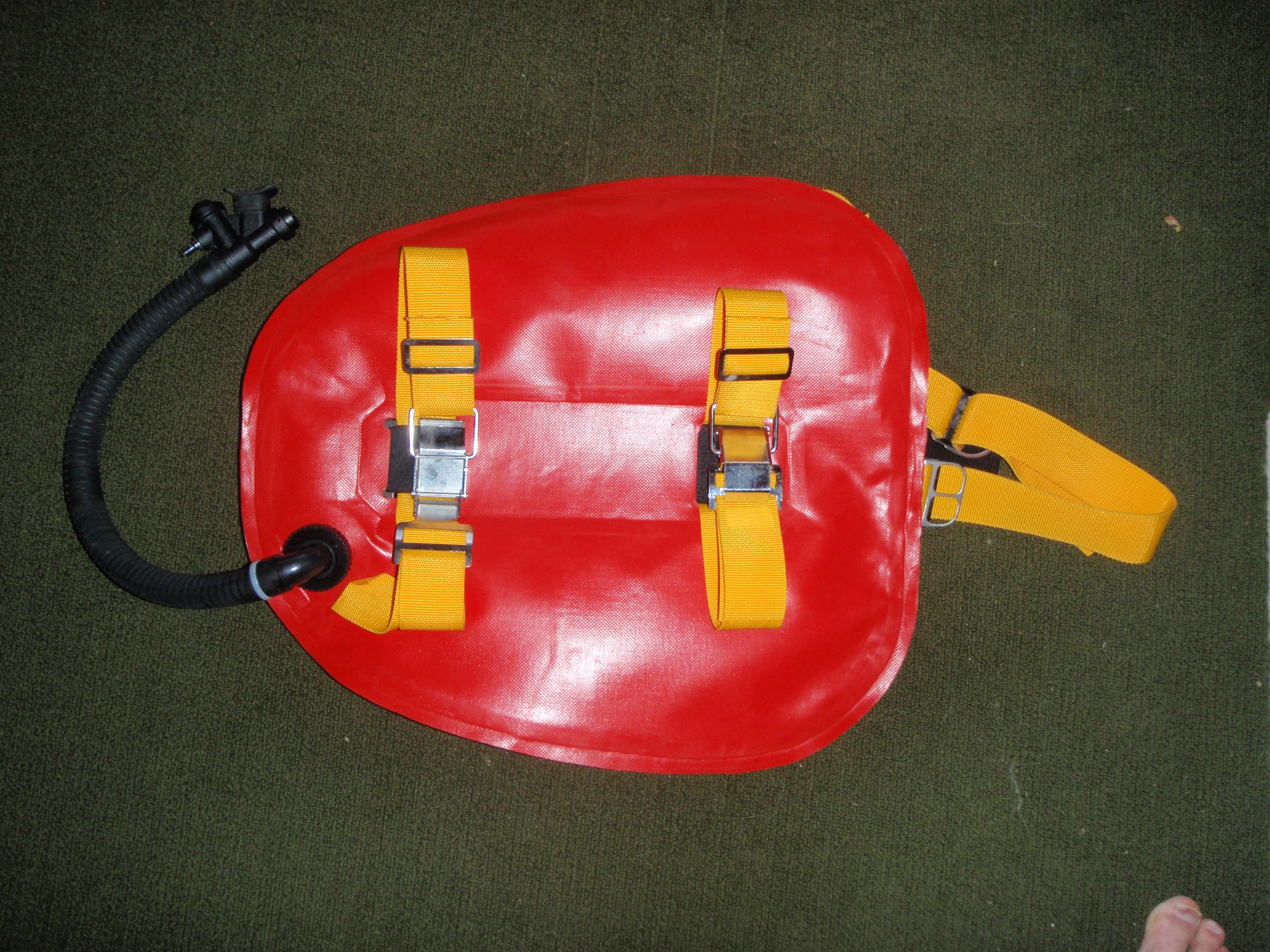
Lightweight travel diving harness - back view, showing camstraps

=== Ancillary equipment ===
The backplate and wing is a minimalistic system, however it does facilitate addition of other equipment. Ancillary equipment, commonly attached to the backplate and wing includes:

- Sling mounted stage cylinders or decompression cylinders.
- "Tow behind" diver propulsion vehicles, which use a tow-cord, attaching to the crotch strap D-ring of the harness.
- Pockets.
- Cutting tool sheath.
- Dive lights and dive light battery canisters.
- Some or all of the diver's ballast weights may be bolted to the plate, clipped to the harness webbing, or strapped to the cylinder (tank weights). A v-weight, keel weight or p-weight, trim weights or clip-on weights may be used.

Some of this equipment is difficult to attach to other styles of BCD.

=== Hogarthian configuration ===
The Hogarthian scuba configuration or "Hogarthian rig" is a specific version of the backplate and wing arrangement developed largely by William Hogarth Main and other members of the Woodville Karst Plain Project as particularly suited to the diving conditions of the Florida caves, and adopted by the DIR scuba movement as an all-purpose scuba configuration.

== Images ==
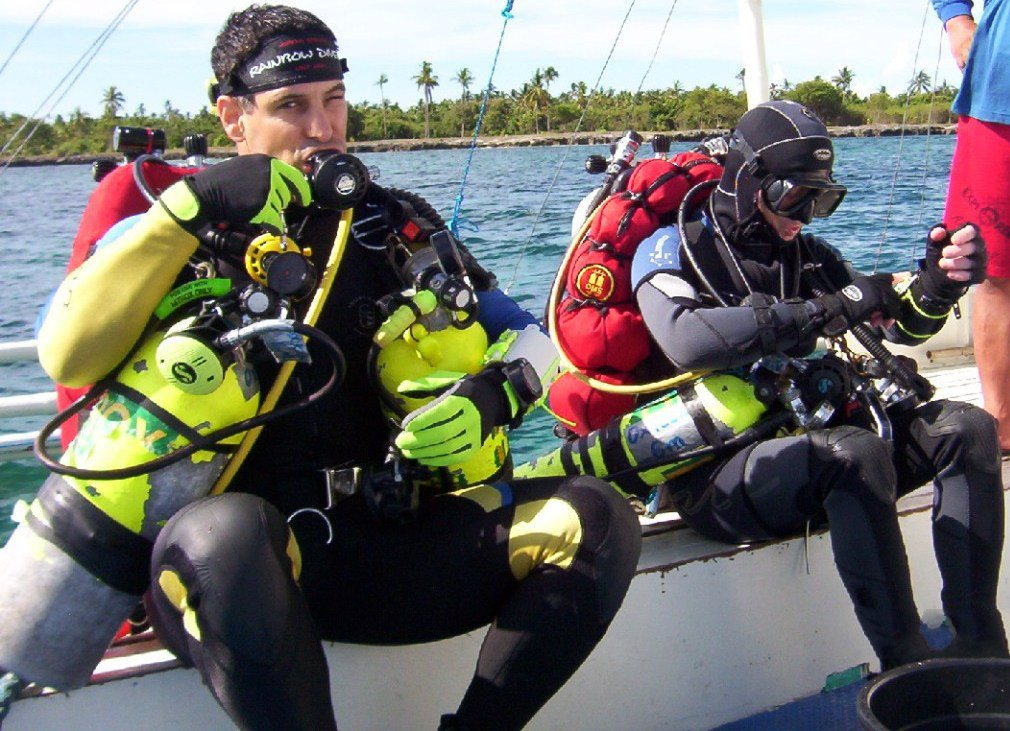
Technical divers preparing for a mixed-gas decompression dive. Note the backplate and wing setup with side mounted stage tanks.

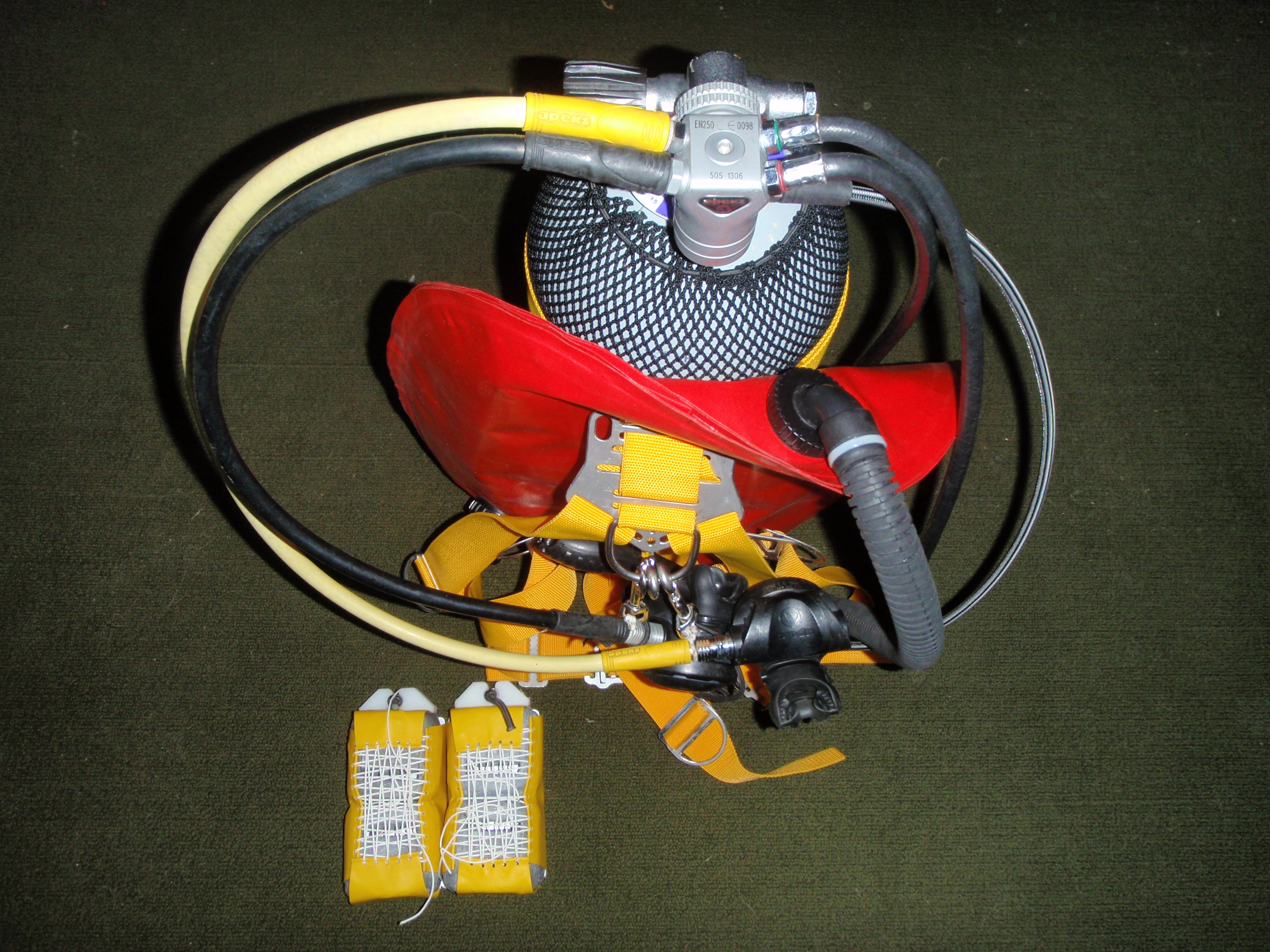
Lightweight travel diving harness - assembled with 15l steel cylinder and regulator set. A travel weight set with weights assembled stands at the cylinder base.

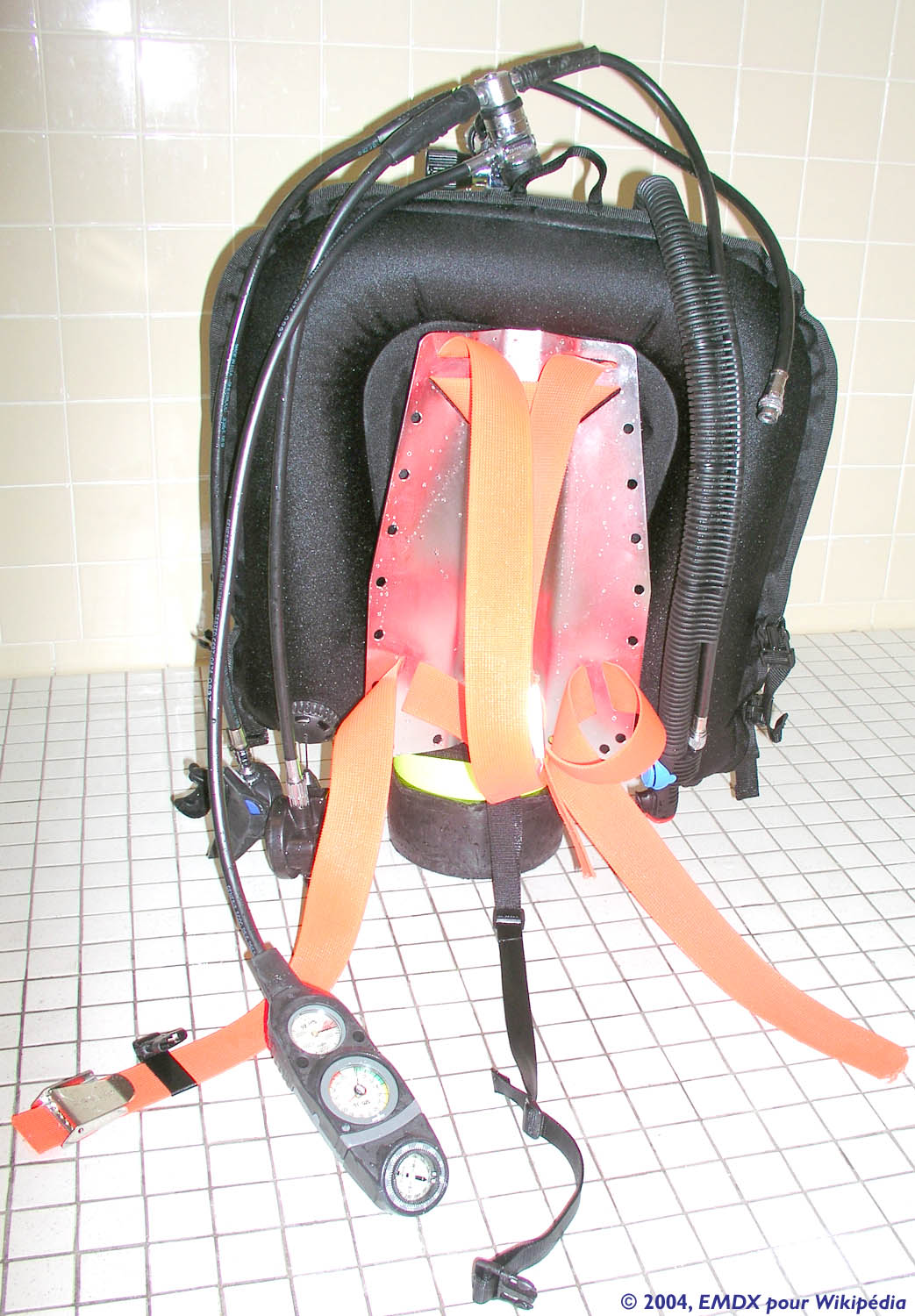
Homemade backplate with wings

== Comparison with alternative equipment ==
The predominant type of BCD currently used in recreational diving is the jacket style BCD. The backplate and wing differs from the jacket style primarily in the way that the functions required of a BCD (attachment to diver, buoyancy control and attachment to cylinder(s)) are performed by distinct components, rather than a single unit. The most significant effects of this division are shifting the buoyancy bladder from the diver's chest to their back and the modularity of the system, allowing buoyancy cells, harnesses, and plates to be interchanged as needed. The buoyancy of a backplate is often significantly negative, especially when the plate is made from stainless steel, and so can replace some of the weight that would otherwise be worn on a weightbelt. Ancillary features that would often be present in jacket BCDs, such as pockets or weight integration, are not found in the core system of a backplate and wing, but can be added as additional components if desired.

Other types of BCD exist which more resemble backplate and wing BCD. Back-inflation BCDs are similar in construction to jacket BCDs, except for where the buoyancy cell is. In a back-inflation BCD, as with a backplate and wing, the cell is behind the diver's back, and is of similar shape to a wing, but a back-inflation BCD usually does not have the modularity of a backplate and wing, although some models let buoyancy cells be substituted.

Softpack BCDs are another style closer still to backplate and wing BCDs. Softpacks, like backplates, are designed to be modular, and are often marketed towards technical divers. A softpack consists of a padded semi-rigid section that serves that same purpose as a backplate, and uses a harness that is either replaceable, like a backplate harness, or permanently fixed. Softpacks may be used with the same models of wings that are used with backplates. The primary differences between these and backplates are the lack of a rigid plate and possible non-separability of the softpack and harness. The relatively low density of the softpack usually necessitates more ballast weight.

A minimalist form of softpack harness is a set of webbing straps much like that of the backplate, but with a webbing strap instead of the plate. This strap may be formed by stitching or threading through sliders a double layer of webbing with slots between the layers which the cambands pass through, and the wing is sandwiched between harness and cylinder. There is no need for a plate, as the cylinder forms the rigid part of the assembly. This arrangement is best suited to single cylinders, and can be made very compact and light for travelling. In some cases a stabiliser plate may be included at the base of the vertical strap, and the harness shoulder and waistband straps thread through this as is done on the standard backplate.

== History ==
Early scuba sets were simply a set of harness straps connected to a cylinder or manifolded group of cylinders, with a regulator connected to the cylinder valve. This works quite satisfactorily for twin and triple sets, which are inherently quite stable on the back, and have little tendency to roll from side to side.

Florida cave diver Greg Flanagan has been credited with inventing a backplate in 1979 to prevent twin cylinders from shifting during a dive, but it is possible that similar systems were in use earlier.

A simple backplate solved the rolling problem, and was often developed into a more ergonomically formed metal, fibreglass, or later, blow-moulded plastic backplate. These usually used simple webbing harness, and were cheap, reliable, and easily repaired. They were usually dedicated to the cylinder, but later versions allowed quick release and attachment of other cylinders. As stabiliser jacket buoyancy compensators became popular, the harness system was integrated with the jacket structure, to simplify the structure and make it easier to use and more comfortable. Eventually most harness systems became more complex and less easy to repair by the user. They also became more bulky over the chest area than the original simple harness systems.

Cave divers found that the bulkiness of the stabiliser jackets over the front and sides of the torso got in the way of suspending additional cylinders at their sides for bailout and decompression gases.

The traditional backplate and wing harness has the benefit of reduced points of failure(due to it usually being a single piece of webbing with the front locking buckle the only break), ability to modify to personal requirements and stronger, safer, points for carrying equipment, and if needed to be attached to in a rescue scenario. Being able to use the same harness to adapt as needed through one's diving career is an added advantage (single tank, dual, rebreather etc.) can make it a more economical approach also. Routine maintenance and replacement of damaged components is simple.

== See also ==
- Doing It Right – Technical diving safety philosophy
- Sidemount diving – Diving using equipment configuration where scuba sets are clipped to the diver's sides
