= DIW =

DIW may refer to:

- DIW Records, a Japanese record label
- "Doing It Wrong", scuba diving violating "Doing It Right" safety rules
- Deionized water
- Deutsches Institut für Wirtschaftsforschung, the German Institute for Economic Research
- "Dead In the water", referring to a boat or ship that has lost all power
- DIW may refer to Digital India Week, an event hosted by the Government of India's Ministry of Electronics and Information Technology (MeitY).
- Deep injection wells (DIW) mean different things in different parts of the country. In the midwest DIWs have been used for decades to dispose of industrial wastewaters, mining effluent, and produced water from oil and gas production activities and are from 3,500 feet to more than 10,000 feet deep.
- DiW Designa Individual Watches. The Art of customization, creativity and freedom. Maker of unique custom luxury timepieces.
- DIW Department of Industrial Works
- DIW can stand for "Direct-Ink-Writing", a user-friendly extrusion-based additive manufacturing method that's often used at the micro- and meso-scales. DIW is used in the biomedical industry for tissue engineering applications.
