= Ratio decompression =

Rule of thumb for estimating a decompression schedule for a given set of breathing gases

Ratio decompression (usually referred to in abbreviated form as ratio deco) is a technique for calculating decompression schedules for scuba divers engaged in deep diving without using dive tables, decompression software or a dive computer. It is generally taught as part of the "DIR" philosophy of diving promoted by organisations such Global Underwater Explorers (GUE) Innerspace Explorers (ISE) and Unified Team Diving (UTD) at the advanced technical diving level. It is designed for decompression diving executed deeper than standard recreational diving depth limits using trimix as a "bottom mix" breathing gas.

There have been three iterations of UTD Ratio Deco, The latest as of 2021 is RD 3.0, which has less emphasis on deep stops than RD 2.0.

== Theory ==
The physiology behind the off-gassing of nitrogen or helium absorbed by the body from breathing gases under pressure has never been definitively established, particularly in relation to the formation of bubbles in the body's tissues, and a number of different algorithms have been developed over the years, based on simplified hypotheses of gas transport and absorption in body tissues, modified to fit empirical data, to predict the rate of off-gassing to reduce the risk of decompression sickness in divers to an acceptable level. However, these models do not describe the individual physiology of the diver accurately: divers have been known to suffer symptomatic decompression sickness whilst diving within the limits of dive tables or dive computers (sometimes referred to as an "undeserved hit"), and divers have exceeded No Decompression Limits but remained asymptomatic.

While Ratio Decompression is not a complete decompression model, it most resembles those of Bühlmann algorithm, and the Varying Permeability Model algorithm, with emphasis on the use of deep stops and gradient factors. It is a type of simplified curve fitting applied to a model decompression profile considered by the author of the model to be acceptable based on experience.

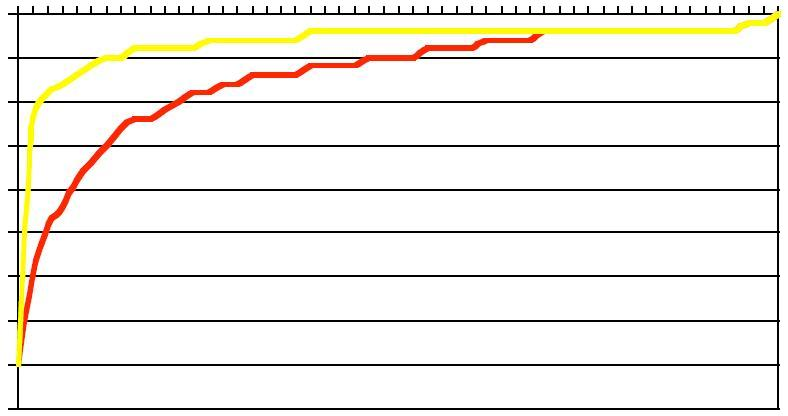
A theoretical illustration of different ascent profiles. Ratio deco would be expected to give a slower ascent similar to the red line profile, whereas traditional Haldanean models would be expected to give a steeper ascent similar to the yellow line profile. Illustration only - not calculated on the basis of any actual profile.

A conventional decompression profile, based on a dissolved gas model algorithm, will result in a diver ascending relatively quickly through shorter deep stops before spending a great deal of time at the shallower stops (resulting in a much sharper angle in the depth/time graph of the ascent profile), ratio deco will allow a diver to dynamically take a total decompression obligation for a given dive and create a profile which makes better use the most effective parts of the decompression profile, and spends comparatively less time at the less effective stops (resulting in a much softer curve in the depth/time graph of the ascent profile).

== Methodology ==
The basis for calculating a decompression schedule using ratio decompression is actually relatively simple (and certainly much simpler than the extremely complicated algorithms used by dive computers). The following represents a slightly simplified summary of the process. Not all versions of ratio deco use exactly the same procedure.

The starting point is to ascertain the correct ratio (from whence the technique gets its name) of the amount of total decompression time as a ratio to the total bottom time. This ratio is fixed solely by reference to depth. Although on traditional tables the amount of decompression would vary according to time at depth, the basis of the theory that most dives will operate within a range of normalcy which makes the use of fixed ratios permissible. Certain depths establish certain ratios; a 1:1 ratio occurs at approximately 150 feet (46 m); a 2:1 ratio occurs at approximately 220 feet (67 m). Between these depths, for each 10 feet (3 m) deeper or shallower than a fixed ratio depth, the diver will then add or subtract a specified number of minutes to their total decompression time. Accordingly, once the diver knows their planned depth and time, they can look up the most proximate ratio, calculate the difference in depths, and add or subtract the appropriate number of minutes from their total bottom time to give a total decompression time.

Unlike traditional dive tables (but on a similar basis as dive computers which accumulate gas loading based on summation of ingassing at current depth over short intervals - ratio deco sums over 5 minute intervals while computers may refine this to 30 second intervals or less), ratio deco is calculated by reference to average depth rather than maximum depth. The technique also requires that the dive be divided into 5 minute segments, and the total decompression time accumulated for each 5 minute segment be calculated. To add an element of conservatism, divers lump 5 minute segments into pairs, and use the deeper depth of the pair to calculate the amount of decompression time accumulated.

Once the diver has calculated the total required decompression time, they calculate the depth at which the deep stops commence. To do this, they calculate the absolute pressure (in atmospheres absolute) at their maximum depth, and multiplying this figure by either 6 (for feet) or 2 (for meters), and then deducting that figure from the maximum depth, and rounding up to the next shallower increment of 10 feet (3 m). That is the depth at which the deep stops will commence, and is equivalent to a pressure of 80% of the pressure at maximum depth. The diver will then do standard deep stops at every 10 feet (3 m) until they reach the depth for the appropriate gas switch to their decompression gas. The diver is expected to do at least 3 minutes at the gas switch stop to acclimatise to the higher partial pressure of oxygen (known as the "oxygen window in technical diving"), and use this window to calculate the remaining stops.

After the gas switch is made, the actual decompression is performed. The total decompression is divided into two - half up to a depth of 30 feet (9 m), and half between 20 feet (6 m) and the surface. For the deeper half, the diver simply calculates the total number of stops, stopping every 10 feet (3 m), up to and including the last stop, and then divides the deep half of the decompression time equally between all of the stops. At 20 feet (6 m) the diver will then perform the second half of the total required decompression, and then ascend as slowly as possible to the surface (characteristically aiming for 3 feet (1 m) per minute).

== Limitations ==
Ratio decompression has never been adopted by more mainstream technical diver training agencies, such as TDI or IANTD. Although the safety record of ratio deco appears to be good, it suffers from a number of limitations.

- The diver is generally limited to two potential bottom breathing mixes (specific mixes of Trimix). The technique does not work for deep air diving, or if a diver elects to use a bottom or decompression mix other than the ones used to develop the specific ratio deco model.
- The variability suggests that increasingly greater risks are assumed at greater depths and for greater exposures; the modelling works much better when the decompression time to bottom time ratio is 1:1 or less.
- Whilst the mathematical computations are manageable, it involves a greater degree of task loading, that appears unnecessary given the ready availability of dive computers and dive planning software.
- It can result in the diver conducting more decompression than is necessary by adding several deep stops and an additional 6 minutes to surface after decompression time has elapsed. This criticism is probably unwarranted - almost all decompression software and computers result in a diver doing more decompression than, on average, is necessary; but because of lack of certainty over the physiology, a sizeable degree of conservatism is usually employed.

GUE has not been keen on the wider use of the technique, and has always stressed that ratio deco should form part of the wider DIR philosophy espoused by the organisation. GUE has expressed concerns that divers trying to utilise the technique without proper training, or without employing DIR approach to skill development, hydration and fitness leads to an unacceptably high risk of decompression sickness.

However, the technique has a history of successful decompressions, and regardless of theoretical efficiency and lack of formal validation, it has undoubted value in emergency situations where a dive plan is seriously compromised, and a personal dive computer, or appropriate contingency decompression schedule, is not in use.

== Independent review ==
Although at that date no independent forensic review of ratio decompression as a decompression algorithm had been conducted, in his book Deco for Divers, Mark Powell considers ratio decompression, and analyses it in slightly simplistic "flattening the curve" terms, illustrating it by way of comparison to certain more traditional models. Nonetheless, given the limited amount of forensic research available on any decompression algorithm, it is difficult to see what further comment the author would have been in a position to make.

A comparison based on changes in inflammatory profiles between divers decompressing from a single trimix dive using ratio deco and the ZH-L16 algorithm modified by a 30/85 gradient factor was made in 2016. The dive profiles were 50m for 25 minutes in open water, followed by the decompression appropriate to the algorith used, The Ratio model used deeper stops and a total ascent time 6 minutes longer than the ZH-L16 model. Matched control groups of recreational divers on air and surface swimmers were used to compare with the effects of air decompression and exercise with no decompression on the inflammarory profile. No symptomatic DCS was observed in the Ratio group. Electrocardiography was done at 30minutes after surfacing, and blood samples taken to test for inflammatory markers.

There were no statistically significant differences in bubble grading between the two decompression models. A significant increase in inflammatory markers was detected in the recreational air divers and the Ratio deco divers, with insignificant change in the ZH-L16 group, and no correlation between bubble grades and circulating inflammatory marker levels.
