= Global Underwater Explorers =

Recreational/technical scuba training and certification agency

Global Underwater Explorers, Inc.
- Founded: 1998
- Type: 501(c)(3) Nonprofit organization
- Purpose: research, exploration, science and education
- Location: High Springs, Florida, United States
- Region served: Worldwide
- Revenue: Membership and donations
- Website: www.gue.com

Global Underwater Explorers (GUE) is a scuba diving organization that provides education within recreational, technical, and cave diving. It is a nonprofit membership organization based in High Springs, Florida, United States.

GUE was formed by Jarrod Jablonski and gained early prominence in association with the success of its well-known Woodville Karst Plain Project (WKPP), which now has the status of a nonprofit affiliate of GUE. Jablonski, the president of GUE, promoted the ideas of "Hogarthian" gear configuration attributed to William Hogarth Main, and the "Doing It Right" (DIR) system of diving, to a global audience. Following the WKPP's introduction in 1995 of a standardized approach to gear configuration and diving procedures, there was a significant reduction in diving incidents within the Woodville Karst Plain cave system.

The standardized approach is the basis of the diver training program of GUE, marking an important difference from the programs of other recreational diver training organizations. GUE also focuses on protecting the maritime environment. The most popular GUE course is GUE Fundamentals, which is designed to introduce the GUE system to non-GUE divers and is the pathway to technical courses. Further courses are offered in recreational, technical, and cave diving, as well as instructor courses.

== Foundation ==
GUE is a nonprofit 501(c)(3) organization formed to promote education, conservation, and exploration of the aquatic realm. The organization was formed by Jarrod Jablonski and a small group of educators, explorers, and diving instructors. The founding members sought to build upon the history of the Cousteau Society by creating a diverse network of satellite organizations. In this way, local advocates help GUE establish detailed diver training, vibrant exploration, and sustainable conservation initiatives. When GUE was formed it was co-located with Extreme Exposure dive store. However, Extreme Exposure has subsequently changed locations, which has allowed for further growth of GUE.

== Board of directors ==
The GUE board of directors includes The Explorers Club fellow Jarrod Jablonski, entrepreneur Robert Carmichael, researcher Todd Kincaid, Corey Jablonski, Gideon Liew, Richard Lundgren, and Sam Meacham.

== Training ==
Among the diving community, GUE is known for a rigorous style of training that diverges from other diver training organizations and seeks to establish high levels of diver proficiency by extending training time, establishing objective performance criteria, and requiring requalification among its instructors and divers. GUE diver training started with technical cave and technical diving classes, expanding into recreational training while refining its most popular class known as GUE Fundamentals. GUE also adheres to a standardized equipment and procedural system, which it claims enhances diver safety and efficiency by reducing confusion and helping divers act as a team. This latter training component is a controversial aspect of GUE training, as it stipulates a fairly strict set of guiding principles. GUE's founder, Jarrod Jablonski, was a long-time proponent of a standardized system known as Hogarthian diving and also a key architect in the Doing It Right (DIR) system, which extends the scope of standardized diving equipment and procedures.

In February 2016, the British Sub-Aqua Club confirmed that a review has been completed on how to integrate GUE divers into BSAC branches.

=== Courses ===
As of May 2017, GUE offered 26 courses in four subject areas.

- Recreational Diver Curriculum:
  - Discover Diving
  - Recreational Supervised Diver
  - Recreational Diver Level 1 - Nitrox diver
  - Recreational Diver Level 2 - Triox diver
  - Recreational Diver Level 3 - Trimix diver
- Foundational Diver Curriculum
  - Doubles Primer
  - Drysuit Primer
  - GUE Fundamentals (available as two separate classes: GUE Fundamentals Part 1 and Part 2)
  - Diver Propulsion Vehicle Level 1
  - Diver Propulsion Vehicle Cave
  - Documentation Diver
  - Gas Blender
  - Rescue Primer
  - Navigation Primer
  - Triox Primer
- Technical Diver Curriculum:
  - Technical Diver Level 1
  - Tech 60
  - Technical Diver Level 2
  - Technical Diver Level 2 "Plus" Upgrade
  - Technical Diver Level 3
  - Rebreather Diver (includes RB80 and JJ-CCR courses)
- Cave Diver Curriculum:
  - Cave Diver Level 1
  - Cave Diver Level 2
  - Underwater Cave Survey

=== EUF Certification ===
GUE obtained CEN certification from the EUF certification body in 2013 for the following diver grades:

- GUE Fundamentals/GUE Recreational Diver Level 1 - EN 14153-2/ISO 24801-2 (i.e., 'Autonomous Diver')
- GUE Recreational Diver Level 3 - EN 14153-3/ISO 24801-3 (i.e., 'Dive Leader')
- GUE Fundamentals Instructor/GUE Recreational Instructor Level 1 - EN 14413-2/ISO 24802-2 (i.e., 'Instructor Level 2')
- GUE Fundamentals/GUE Recreational Diver Level 1 - ISO 11107 (i.e., 'Nitrox diving').

== WKPP ==
The best known of GUE's satellite organizations is the Woodville Karst Plain Project (WKPP), which is a non-profit affiliate of GUE. GUE members are engaged in science and exploration projects conducted by the WKPP. This collaboration helped encourage the state of Florida to budget more than 200 million dollars toward the development of enhanced wastewater treatment practices as means to enhance ground water protection and support the conservation of Wakulla Springs State Park. GUE has launched a global conservation project known as Project Baseline to document the condition of global aquatic environments.

== Outreach ==
Some of the organization's notable outreach projects have included:

- GUE and Woodville Karst Plain Project (WKPP) members made a record 5.6 km (3.5 mi) cave penetration in Wakulla Springs in 1998, followed by new records in 2001 and 2006.
- GUE and the WKPP provided video captured by documentary filmmaker Marc Singer for Hazlett-Kincaid, Inc.'s interactive, multimedia exhibit Awesome Aquifer Adventure which highlighted various aspects of groundwater for the Reading Public Museum. The sixth month exhibit ended March 24, 2002.
- The Ocean Conservancy beach clean-up at Hutchinson Island located in Martin County, Florida in 2003.
- The "Underwater Exploration and the DIR system" was held in Italy.
- The "GUE Conference 2005" was held in Gainesville, Florida.
- GUE volunteers supported the scanning and archiving of the Undersea and Hyperbaric Medical Society journals with the Rubicon Foundation.
- The "GUE Conference 2006" was held in Gainesville, Florida.
- The "GUE Conference 2007" was held in Budapest, Hungary.
- In 2008, GUE was a sponsor for the Divers Alert Network Technical Diving Workshop held Durham, North Carolina.
- In 2011, three members of the GUE and Projecto Espeleológico de Tulum dive team, Alex Alvarez, Franco Attolini, and Alberto Nava, explored a section of cave known as Hoyo Negro for their work with the Quintana Roo Speleological Survey. The divers located the remains of a mastodon as well as a human skull that may be the oldest evidence of early man in the area to date.

GUE instructors regularly host "Introduction to GUE" workshops aimed at promoting the Global Underwater Explorers approach to diving.

== Publications ==
GUE publishes a quarterly journal, Quest, as well as a number of books and videos related to their philosophy of diving. These are generally available through their website, other online retailers and bookshops.

GUE also began publishing annual reports in 2016 to provide the public with a better overview of community dive projects, Project Baseline activities, and GUE training and operational information.

- Jablonski, Jarrod (2001). Doing it Right: The Fundamentals of Better Diving. Global Underwater Explorers. ISBN 0-9713267-0-3.
- Jablonski, Jarrod (2003). Beyond the Daylight Zone: The Fundamentals of Cave Diving. Global Underwater Explorers.
- Jablonski, Jarrod (2003). Getting Clear on the Basics: The Fundamentals of Technical Diving. Global Underwater Explorers.
- MacKay, Dan. Dress for Success. Global Underwater Explorers.
- Berglund, Jesper. Beginning With the End in Mind - the Fundamentals of Recreational Diving. Global Underwater Explorers.
- GUE (2004). DIR 2004 (DVD). Global Underwater Explorers. Archived from the original on 2011-06-11.
- GUE (2005). Pantelleria 2005 (DVD). Global Underwater Explorers. Archived from the original on 2008-09-09.
- GUE (2006). The Mysterious Malady: Toward an understanding of decompression injuries (DVD). Global Underwater Explorers. Archived from the original on 2011-06-11.
- GUE (2006). The Woodville Karst Plain Project: Chip's Hole Exploration 1996-2005 (DVD). Global Underwater Explorers. Archived from the original on 2011-06-11.
