= William Hogarth Main =

Cave diver and scuba configuration experimentalist

William "Bill" Hogarth Main
- Known for: Developer of the Hogarthian dive gear configuration

William "Bill" Hogarth Main is a cave diving pioneer who is best known as a developer in the 1980s, and the namesake of, the "Hogarthian gear configuration" that is a component of the "Doing It Right" (DIR) holistic approach to scuba diving. According to Jarrod Jablonski, the Hogarthian style "has many minor variations, yet its focus asserts a policy of minimalism." The configuration was refined in the 1990s, partially through the Woodville Karst Plain Project (WKPP), established in 1985 and considered among the most aggressive cave diving initiatives in the world.

Main began diving in 1966 or early 1967 after completing the NAUI Open Water Course, made his first cave dive on a single tank in 1969, and switched to double tanks on a single regulator in 1972. Main describes this period: "There was no formal cave training back then. We just worked things out as we went along, and made the things we needed that didn't exist." Following a challenging dive, Main decided with fellow diver Bill Gavin that all WKPP deep dives would be on mixed gas.

Main, along other members of the WKPP such as Lamar English, George Irvine, and Jablonski all cultivated the idea that there was an ideal equipment configuration that should be standardized among the WKPP divers. As Main put considerable efforts towards streamlining configurations, his middle name was taken to represent the approach. Main asserts that term "Hogarthian" was initially used as a joke by fellow diving pioneer John Zumrick.

While Main continues to work with equipment to create more efficient configurations, the "Hogarthian approach" became widely known, largely through the WKPP breaking every distance record for cave diving without any fatalities or serious injuries. The configuration is sometimes abbreviated "Hog" or "hog," often by divers who are unaware that it refers to a person, with at least one claim in the DIR diving community that William Hogarth Main is a fictional person. While "Hogarthian" and "DIR" were sometimes used interchangeably in early descriptions of the approach, by 2010, "Hogarthian" referred to gear configuration, as opposed to the holistic system of DIR of which Hogarthian rigs were a part.

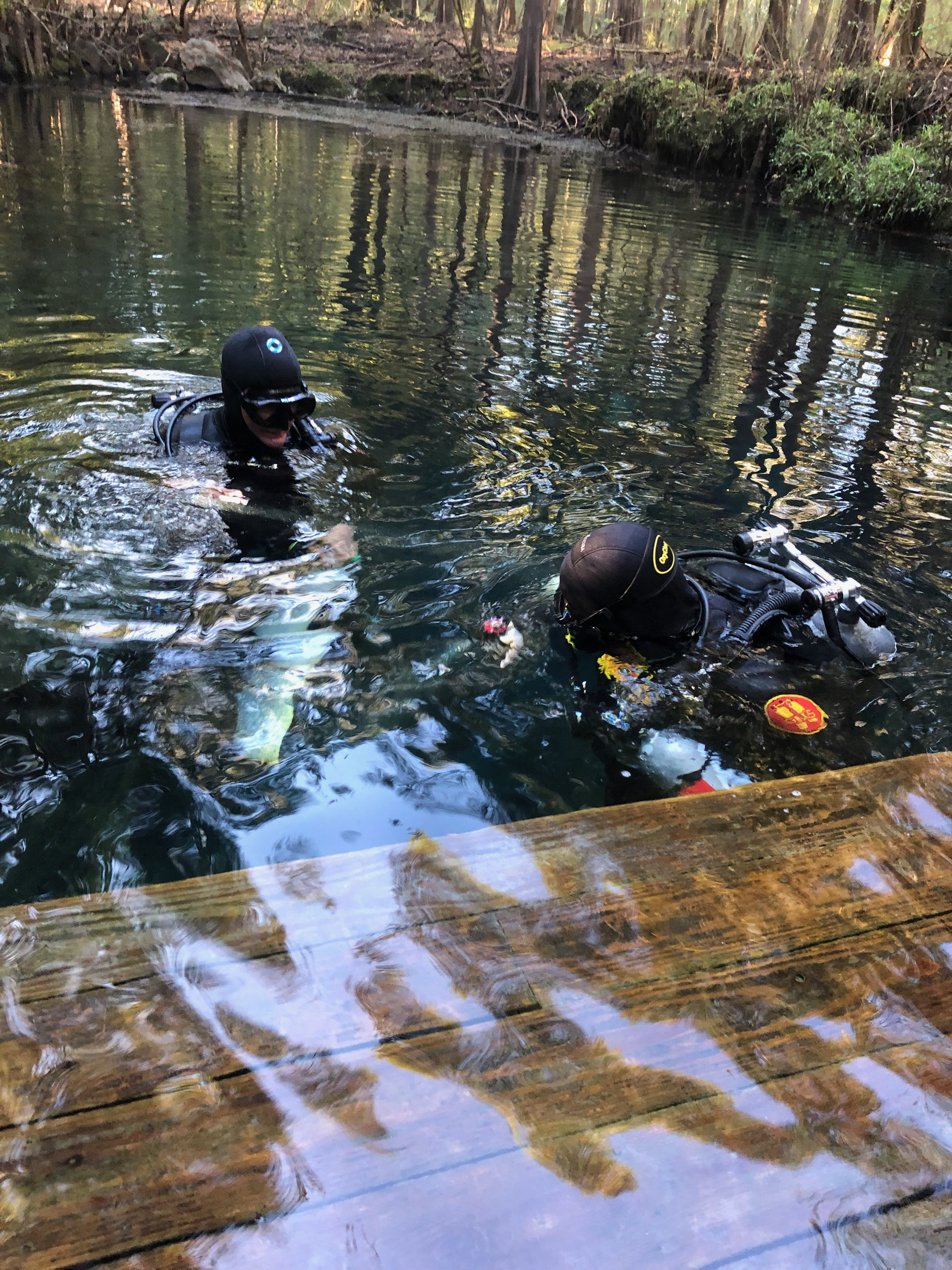
Preparing for a cave dive.

== See also ==
- Doing It Right – Technical diving safety philosophy
- Backplate and wing – Type of back-mount scuba harness
