= Doing It Right (scuba diving) =

Technical diving safety philosophy

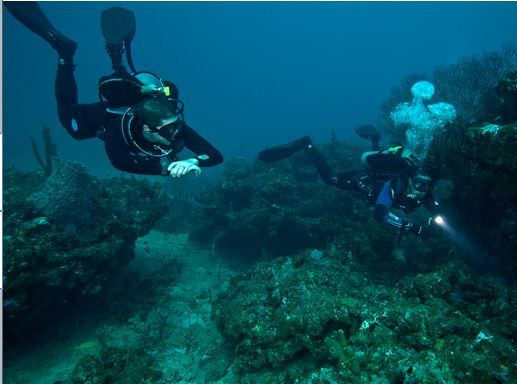
DIR divers

Doing It Right (DIR) is a holistic approach to scuba diving that encompasses several essential elements, including fundamental diving skills, teamwork, physical fitness, and streamlined and minimalistic equipment configurations. DIR proponents maintain that through these elements, safety is improved by standardizing equipment configuration and dive-team procedures for preventing and dealing with emergencies.

DIR evolved out of the efforts of divers involved in the Woodville Karst Plain Project (WKPP) during the 1990s, who were seeking ways of reducing the fatality rate in those cave systems. The DIR philosophy is now used as a basis for teaching scuba diving from entry-level to technical and cave qualifications by several organizations, such as Global Underwater Explorers (GUE), Unified Team Diving (UTD) and InnerSpace Explorers (ISE).

== History ==
The DIR approach (and name) evolved out of the Woodville Karst Plain Project (WKPP) in the mid-1990s, where the objective was conducting dives in a very high risk environment: Not only cave diving, but also deep, long duration and exploration of previously unknown parts of a very large cave system. The origins of the approach to equipment taken by DIR practitioners can be found in the 'Hogarthian' equipment configuration attributed to William Hogarth Main. These individuals, along with many others, were attempting to develop equipment and procedures to allow the safer exploration of the deep submerged caves in the area. Successfully carrying out the advanced diving required for deep cave penetration, as in the Woodville Karst Plain Project, places a great need to focus on the fundamentals of exactly how such diving should be carried out, and how equipment should be selected and configured for this type of diving, to maximise mission effectiveness and minimise risk. The DIR approach was originally confined to cave diving, but soon spread to other forms of technical diving. Since recreational diving is the natural source of future technical divers, the DIR philosophy was extended into this field, although the recreational practices were already considered acceptably low risk by most diver certification agencies and insurance companies.

The phrase "Doing It Right" as applied to diving is thought to have appeared in 1995 in an article by George Irvine III. Irvine and Jarrod Jablonski eventually formalized and popularized this approach as DIR, promoting its practices for all forms of scuba diving. Irvine's polemic style and inflexible stance led to a great deal of controversy and, while popularizing the style among some people, repelled many others. This has begun to ameliorate somewhat. As of 2009, there are at least two US-based dive training organizations, Global Underwater Explorers (GUE) and Unified Team Diving (UTD), and many independent dive instructors who teach a DIR style of diving. GUE renamed its 'DIR Fundamentals' course to 'GUE Fundamentals' in 2007, distancing itself somewhat from the acronym "DIR". In 2013, GUE first started offering a Closed circuit rebreather course breaking with some core DIR principles, and has reduced the prerequirements for the course progressively from prior hypoxic trimix training to offering it to divers with only the lowest GUE tech training completed in 2024. Additionally, in 2017, GUE started offering a sidemount course, providing yet another configuration alteration of the original DIR setup. Similarly, UTD have modified the original DIR methodology to suit sidemount and Closed circuit rebreather use.

Primary areas of focus
Aspect	Rationale	Claimed implications
Team diving	The logistical complexity of deep cave diving requires a team effort to achieve goals.	Individuals may need to switch assignments. This makes it essential to have interchangeability of divers. This in turn requires standardisation of diving equipment and procedures among all divers within the group that makes up the team.; It also makes “non-team” related diving particularly dangerous, when trying to achieve the many tasks needed for this type of diving.
Dive planning	Deep cave diving requires a comprehensive and detailed plan. The parameters and dive profiles for such a plan generally require meticulous pre-dive computations and preparation to mitigate the considerable risk. Such planning is rendered pointless if it is not followed.	The selection and use of any equipment item must be made within the context of overall effectiveness of achieving dive goals
Technical diving/ Cave diving	Deep, decompression diving is necessarily required to effect penetration diving on the WKPP. Extended dive duration and surveys of previously unexplored parts of the cave system exposed divers to unprecedented exposures. Diving of this type is subject to increased level of risk and increased risks require more stringent mitigation.	Equipment must be selected such that it is suitable for more advanced diving practise. Such equipment should be consistently reliable and offer adequate performance for the more extreme environments it may be used in. It is proposed that this equipment is also suitable for less extreme activities.; Redundancy in equipment is necessary in main life-support systems. Part of this redundancy must be provided by the diver, and part can be provided by the combined team.; The large amount of equipment necessary for the extreme penetrations made it essential to rigorously optimise every aspect of equipment configuration and procedure to keep the task loading and equipment burden to a level that made the dives physically practicable at a personally acceptable level of risk.; Equipment must be minimised to only what is essential to minimise failure modes and accomplish the tasks of the dive.

== Tenets ==
"Doing It Right" (DIR) is a scuba diving philosophy centered on standardized safety procedures, buddy support, and teamwork. The system advocates for a specific, streamlined equipment configuration to minimize task loading, reduce drag, and lower entanglement risks. Proponents assert that this uniform approach improves maneuverability, buoyancy control, and overall team efficiency.

A holistic approach to diving is a central DIR principle. DIR is a system and as such equipment configuration should be considered within the context of the whole philosophy, and the ultimate aims of ensuring safety, efficiency and enjoyment. Diving equipment is viewed as only one part of the diving activity. DIR proponents believe that the most important piece of dive equipment is the diver, followed by the team, and the interactions between the team members.

=== Experience ===
Experience is considered a key aspect of becoming a good diver. It is the result of training and familiarity with the demands of the various environments. Training of fundamental skills by a suitably competent professional educator is recommended as the most effective route to gaining experience safely, however this is not a substitute for time spent in the water practicing and using the skills, as this produces the familiarity and comfort of repetitive exposure, eventually allowing the diver to perform the skills with minimised stress and delay, even in difficult circumstances.

=== Ability ===
Competence is a combination of knowledge, aptitude and practice of good technique. Knowledge and technique can be learned, and assiduous practice can compensate for lack of natural aptitude. Course training does not generally provide sufficient time to hone skills and develop the optimum level of knowledge, and therefore additional review and practice are usually necessary.

=== Equipment ===
DIR proponents say equipment configuration should be simple, streamlined, exactly sufficient or minimalistic and applicable to all diving situations, from shallow reef diving to long cave penetrations. It must also be appropriate for reliable team support, so the configuration of each diver's equipment must be familiar to all members of the dive team

==== Streamlined equipment and standardised configuration ====
The standard DIR equipment configuration is fairly well established. The configuration has been designed and evolved to work in all situations. The intention was to improve a diver's efficiency and overall convenience and minimise risk. The configuration is minimalist and streamlined, and equipment should not hang free, stick out or increase drag unnecessarily, or cause entanglement.

==== Balance and trim ====
The DIR rig is carefully weighted to ensure that the diver is not overweight but is able to maintain accurate depth and trim at any decompression stop. This requires assessment of how each component part fits into and affects the buoyancy characteristics of the configuration as a whole. The choice of cylinder size and material must be made with due consideration of the effects on buoyancy and trim in conjunction with the selection of dive suit

==== Gas selection parameters ====
The parameters for gas use recommended by DIR are relatively conservative. These include:

- Equivalent narcotic depth (END) of less than 100 fsw (30 msw)
- Partial pressure of oxygen (pO_{2}) not exceeding 1.2 atm (1.2 bar) for the active sectors of a dive. Currently 1.0 atm.
- Partial pressure of oxygen (pO_{2}) not exceeding 1.4 atm (1.4 bar) for decompression stops, 1.6 atm for 100% oxygen (may be exceeded in dry chamber).
- Liberal use of helium together with the conservative use of oxygen to limit the toxic effects of oxygen, nitrogen and carbon dioxide. Air is not listed as one of the recommended gases: Either nitrox or trimix will have advantages over air at any given stage of a complex dive.
- Standardised breathing gases are promoted to simplify the logistics of mixing gases and marking cylinders. This makes decompression planning simpler and reduces task loading when sharing gas in an emergency, as all divers in the team have the same decompression plan.
- Cylinders are marked with the Enriched Air Percentage, maximum operating depth (MOD) in a clear and easily identifiable manner, and time/date and person confirming mix and MOD before usage. This practice is used in conjunction with standardised mixtures as a simple and reliable identification procedure.

=== Unified team ===
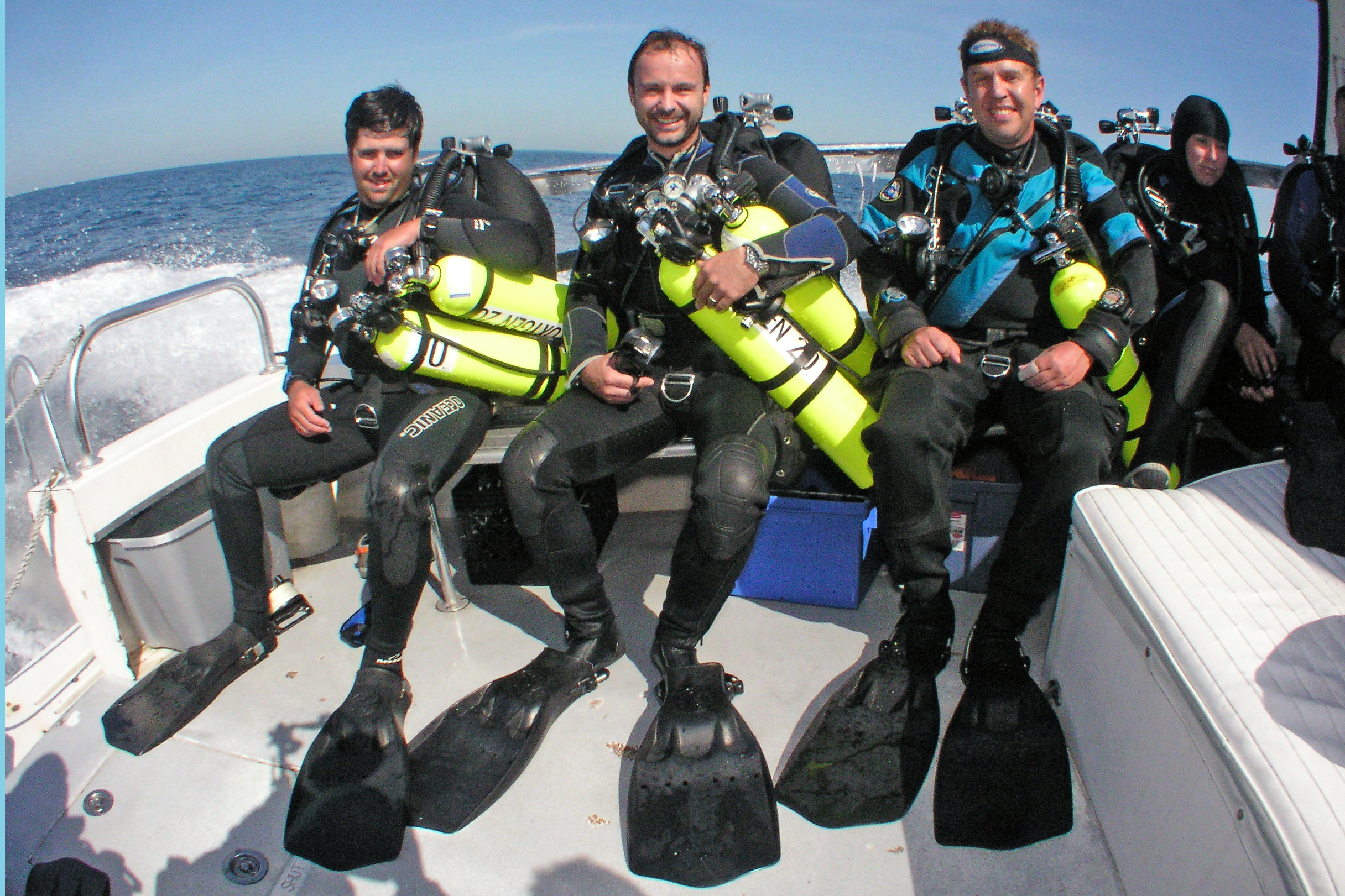
DIR divers

The notion of a unified dive team is central to the DIR philosophy. A unified team acts in concert to preserve the safety of the team and meet the goals of the dive. All of the team's equipment and its consumables (i.e. breathing gas, batteries) are held in common and dedicated to the safety, comfort and dive goals of the team. In addition, each team member should be familiar with what all other team members are carrying.

Divers of similar competence and preparation are grouped together to form a team that provides greater safety than possible if they dive independently. By maintaining a similar high level of care and attention among the team members, the experience of diving as part of the team can be more rewarding and satisfactory than diving without the support of such a team.

=== Preparation ===
The notion of preparation within the DIR ethos applies well before the divers approach the water. It encompasses personal physical fitness, mental fitness, rigorous planning and pre-dive safety drills and routines.

==== Fitness ====
DIR divers are expected to keep themselves physically fit, as this reduces the stressful effects of high levels of exertion, and provides the diver with a better chance of effectively dealing with a problem. GUE minimum level of fitness is equivalent to a 400m continuous swim. with a medium fitness rated as 1600m continuous swim. Whilst all forms of diver training promote physical fitness, the DIR approach takes it further than most.

Mental fitness includes focus on the dive, so that the diver can be responsive to the demands of the dive and remain aware of the situation and surroundings, and respond timeously to contingencies, so that development of crises can be curtailed at an early stage. This approach is supported by the findings of Blumenberg (1996) and Lock (2011)

==== Dive planning ====
===== Unique features =====
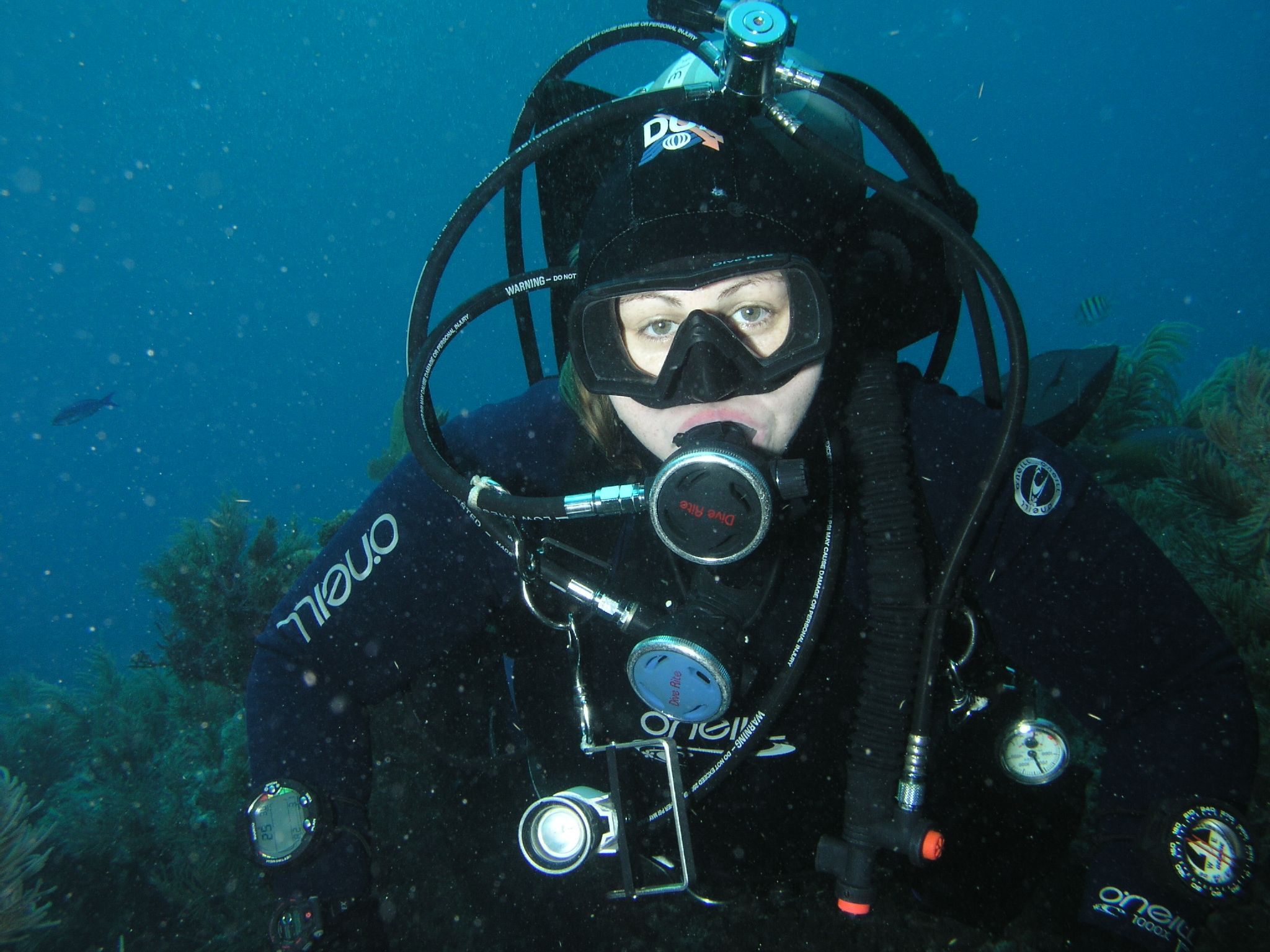
DIR diver

Several features of the DIR approach are at odds with more conventional forms of diver training.

- Ratio decompression — In addition to using established algorithms for decompression diving, DIR utilizes ratio decompression, (RD) which is assumed to yield results that are always on the "safe" side of the Bühlmann decompression algorithm and the Varying Permeability Model. RD is based on the common patterns of output from decompression programs that can be closely approximated by simple calculations in the diver's head. Because no dive computers use this methodology (and DIR eschews dive computers in any event), divers are taught to recalculate decompression schedules on the fly (although they still plan their dives in advance). The degree to which RD is used varies; UTD depends on it heavily, and GUE teaches it as a backup method. Versions of RD used by different agencies following the DIR philosophy may differ, and may be updated to follow developments in decompression knowledge.

==== Training ====
DIR training differs from mainstream Rec/Tec in several ways.

Agencies that promote DIR do not train divers younger than 16 (UTD), (GUE Rec 1), or 14 for divers certified by another agency (GUE Primer).

There are several standardised procedures and safety drills developed by the DIR community. These include:

- Breathing the primary—The primary regulator used during the dive for breathing the back gas is the long hose on the right cylinder valve. The secondary/backup regulator is on the left cylinder valve and is held under the chin on an elastic "necklace"
- Bubble check—to ensure there are no leaks or before committing to the dive. Divers check each other's equipment for bubbles indicating leaks. specifically around first stages, second stages, and gas hoses and fittings and make a general visual check that everything is in place.
- S-Drill—short for safety drill—is a simulated donation of the long hose to ensure that it deploys freely and is routed correctly.
  - In a modified S-drill the long hose is deployed before entering the water or whilst on the surface of the water to make sure it is free.
  - In a full S-Drill the divers descend a few metres and perform simulated out of gas exercises so that they all get practice at sharing gas.
- Valve Drill—to make sure the back gas cylinder and manifold valves are fully open and that the diver can open and close them.
  - In a modified valve drill the diver reaches back and checks that the valves are fully open.
  - In a full valve drill the valves are closed and re-opened in sequence and the regulators checked while a team member stands by in case of problems.

== Fundamental diving skills ==
DIR holds that lack of basic diving skills is common in recreational and technical diving, and the lack of these skills results in stress, fatigue and occasionally fatalities. Poor technique is said to increase stress, and reduce ability to cope with emergencies, which often develop as an accumulation of poor technique and lack of situational awareness. Skill levels should be appropriate to the environment, planned dive profile and tasks.

Unlike some other diver training and certification agencies, GUE is specific about the required standard of performance for the basic skills for a new diver, an advanced diver, and an advanced technical diver, and specifies the equipment the diver should be carrying during assessment in the latter case. This allows an objective assessment of skills. The diver and instructor can both agree whether the skill has been performed as required, and the diver has a specific goal to aim for while practicing. These criteria are shared by professional diver training quality assurance organisations.

The DIR view is that it is essential that divers master the skills of mask clearing, even if it takes many repetitions, as inability to adequately clear the mask leads to stress and distraction, and the dislodging of the mask during a stressful stage of a dive may then lead to panic.

Buoyancy control is considered both an essential skill and one of the most difficult for the novice to master. Lack of proper buoyancy control is likely to disturb or damage the surroundings, and is a source of additional and unnecessary physical effort to maintain precise depth, which also increases stress.

Trim is the diver's attitude in the water, in terms of balance and alignment with the direction of motion. Accurately controlled trim reduces swimming effort, as it reduces the sectional area of the diver passing through the water. A slight head down trim is recommended to reduce downthrust during finning, and this reduces silting and fin impact with the bottom. Buoyancy compensators and weighting systems that make horizontal trim difficult are deprecated for this reason. Systems are recommended that concentrate weight centrally and restrict weighting to what is actually needed to compensate for equipment buoyancy and use of gas during the dive.

The DIR diver must be aware of remaining gas supply at all times, as this is the critical requirement for survival. The diver must be aware of how much gas is needed to return to the surface from any point in the dive, and ensure that this, and a suitable safety margin, is available according to the dive plan.

Efficient propulsion is not only necessary for good gas endurance, but also for skilled maneuvering. The diver is required to master finning styles that are suitable for the different environments and circumstances, and fins must not only be suitable for performing the required finning techniques, but must provide sufficient thrust when needed, and minimise snagging on lines and other items. Overly flexible fins, hinged fins and split fins may be unable to provide these requirements, and are therefore considered an unacceptable handicap. Straps must not fail, and simple, snag free and reliable systems are required.

The ability to find one's way around during a dive can be critical to survival. Navigation skills and techniques appropriate to the environment must be mastered. The dive plan must be understood and followed, and contingency plans should be available for the foreseeable deviations from the plan.

DIR divers must be completely dedicated to the buddy system, primarily in the interest of safety, but also because failure to follow the expected procedures is likely to compromise the dive plan. The DIR buddy and his/her equipment are regarded as backup to the whole team, and provide necessary redundancy in case of equipment failure or other accident, without overburdening the divers with additional equipment. Communication is central to buddy and team diving. DIR divers must be competent at underwater communication by hand signals and light signals, and to use them to ensure that they are always aware of the status of the rest of the team. DIR divers have an extended range of hand signals, some particularly relevant to overhead and decompression diving. Divers are expected to understand hand signals by touch in case of zero visibility.

Familiarity and comfort with equipment are considered important, as the diver should be able to perform necessary procedures quickly and effectively both for efficiency in normal diving, and for safety in emergencies, where any delay can increase the risk of escalation. The use of standardised equipment configurations and procedures is promoted as conducive to familiarity and thereby comfort. The recommended configurations are claimed to be optimised for both comfort and efficiency. DIR proponents indicate that poor equipment handling skills are often due to shortcomings in training programmes, but can also be a result of inherently sub-optimal configurations.

DIR proponents consider that rescue skills and training are necessary for all levels of diver, not only to perform a rescue in an emergency, but also because the training and skills are likely to reduce the risk of an emergency developing in the first place. Most emergencies are the result of bad planning, inadequate skills and lack of awareness culminating in a situation beyond the control of the diver. Self rescue occurs when the diver pre-empts the development of the emergency by recognising the early stages and taking appropriate action. This is facilitated by the same training appropriate to rescue of another diver. The second way of preventing an emergency is monitoring by an aware and alert buddy, who may pick up signs of impending problems by situational awareness and skilled observation, one of the advantages of the unified team concept and effective communications within the team. Actual rescue, though desirable when necessary, often indicates a failure to manage minor problems and a lack of attention to signs of stress buildup. However, there are also occasions when things do go wrong in spite of good planning and procedures—and good training and well honed skills contribute to a successful rescue effort, rather than a double fatality.

The factors most likely to increase risk of an accident are considered to be:

- Going beyond one's level of training. This can be mitigated by appropriate further training.
- Going beyond one's personal level of comfort. This can be mitigated by working up towards dives outside of the current comfort zone in stages. Familiarity and practice reduces stress and improves awareness of detail. Maintaining an adequate standard of fitness can make a big difference to comfort.
- Diving beyond the range of application of a gas mixture. Gas mixtures must be used that are suited to the dive, and it must be possible to positively identify the range of application for the mixture in use. Clear labeling of maximum operating depth is the most effective way of marking the cylinder. Opening the cylinder valve only after checking the MOD and testing the regulator is a positive method for ensuring that the correct gas is in use. Restricting END to 100 feet (30 m) minimises the risk of nitrogen narcosis contributing to poor judgement and reduced efficiency. Stress on the diver can be caused by a large range of factors. It is not possible to eliminate them all, but a large number may be reduced by appropriate training, adequate skills and fitness, the use of suitable equipment in effective configurations, and effective teamwork and communications. In effect, this is the purpose of the DIR system.

== Equipment and configuration ==
DIR equipment choice and equipment configuration should be considered together, as the two are philosophically inseparable. A change to one item of equipment may have complex consequences for the entire configuration and for procedures that depend on that equipment configuration. These consequences must be analysed before making a change. This is not to say that DIR equipment and configuration is immutable and can not be improved, but that all the consequences to the system must be considered when a variation is contemplated, so that knock-on effects can be avoided.

The basic principle of DIR diving also includes familiarity of all divers in the team with all equipment used by the team, and all the procedures intended to be used by the team, and that interchangeability of DIR divers between teams is highly desirable. The natural consequence is that changes are not easily accepted unless very well motivated. This may be interpreted as inflexibility by persons who do not analyse the philosophy of the system.

When there is a choice between two items of equipment with the same purpose, and one is clearly better than the other for a reason that affects risk and safety, the DIR philosophy insists that only use of the safer item is doing it right.

The configurations and procedures recommended by the DIR proponents did not spring into existence fully formed and perfect, they were developed, largely by trial and error, and significantly by William Hogarth Main, who continues experimenting with configurations and equipment in the interests of improving the system.

The DIR equipment system can be described as minimalist. Items of equipment that do not serve a useful purpose on a dive are considered a liability. Redundancy is provided where necessary within the personal equipment of the diver, and where possible by availability of team equipment. Multiple redundancy across personal and team equipment is only resorted to when necessary.

Streamlining and maintaining a low profile and cross sectional area are important considerations but effectiveness and robust applicability to a wide range of environments are possibly more important, as they allow a basic core configuration that is effective in virtually any recreational diving situation, and allow standardisation of procedures, which in turn lets the diving team be assembled from similarly trained and equipped divers, who integrate more easily into an effective team. In this context, streamlining includes the aspect of reducing hydrodynamic drag when swimming, but more importantly, the reduction of entanglement and entrapment hazards due to equipment components to a minimum.

This philosophy does not preclude the use of equipment that is necessary for a special task, but would be applied to the choice of the equipment and how it is transported and deployed.

The standard DIR configuration is also known as the Hogarthian rig in recognition of the development work done on it by William Hogarth Main (Bill Main).

=== Backplate ===
The backplate and harness forms the foundation of the DIR diving equipment system. The back plate is used to support the buoyancy compensator and back gas cylinders and provides storage for other items. The back plate is a rigid plate with minimal padding bent from flat stainless steel or aluminum plate and slotted for straps, or formed from other materials with similar rigidity characteristics. The choice of materials is determined by the operational needs of the diver and the environment. The back plate is designed primarily for double tanks and adaptable for singles tanks as required, using either an adapter or strap cutouts.

=== Harness ===
The harness supports the backplate and its cargo on the diver. It is formed from one continuous length of 2-inch (5.1 cm) nylon webbing secured through dedicated top and bottom slots in the back plate. The webbing must be adjustable and is secured with a single stainless steel buckle located on the diver's right waist, this position lessens the potential of accidental opening by the crotch strap. A crotch strap runs from the bottom of the back plate to a loop in front that the waist strap passes through, securing the harness/back plate system to the diver. The crotch strap prevents the harness system from shifting and riding high on the diver. The harness supports 5 “D” rings, one placed on the divers left waist, one on each shoulder strap, and two on the crotch strap. The left side waist “D” ring is used to attach the back gas SPG, stage bottles, and other gear that may be required for a particular dive. The shoulder “D” rings are used for securing the backup lights, the primary regulator when not in use, and temporary storage of other pieces of equipment. The front crotch strap “D” ring is to be used solely for attachment to a DPV (scooter), and the rear “D” ring is used for attaching equipment as needed. The primary light battery canister is placed on the waist belt on the right, secured with a secondary stainless steel belt buckle or the primary belt buckle as best suits the size of canister and diver.

=== Buoyancy control ===
Buoyancy control involves the balance between the buoyancy of the various items of equipment during the course of a dive. The main variables are:

- Suit buoyancy, which is usually significantly positive, and may vary with depth
- Cylinder buoyancy, which can vary from significantly negative to slightly positive, and increases during the dive as breathing gas is consumed
- Harness and accessories, which are usually all slightly to significantly negative
- Ballast weights, which are a constant negative
- Buoyancy compensator, which is adjustably positive, and compensates for the combined effect of the other equipment.

In keeping with the minimalist philosophy, buoyancy compensators should be only as large as is necessary to provide neutral buoyancy at any point in the dive, and should allow easy, confident and reliable dumping. The volume should not exceed about 65 pounds (29 kg) for twin cylinders or 30 pounds (14 kg) for single cylinders, on the premise that needing more would be evidence that the rig is unbalanced and unsafe, as the diver should be able to drop excess weight and swim up without a functioning buoyancy compensator. An unnecessarily large bladder volume is considered dangerous as it can contribute to a runaway ascent. Wings with the expansion constrained by elastic cords are also deprecated as they can trap air pockets, making it difficult to get all the air out.

Dual bladder buoyancy compensators are considered both unnecessary and unsafe. Unnecessary in that there are alternative methods available to a correctly rigged diver to compensate for a defective BC, and unsafe in that there is no obvious way to tell which bladder is holding air, and a leak into the secondary bladder may go unnoticed until the buoyancy has increased to the extent that the diver is unable to stop the ascent, while struggling to empty the air from the wrong bladder. Monitoring the air content of two bladders is unnecessary additional task loading, which distracts attention from other matters.

The corrugated hose of the inflator assembly should be long enough to easily dump air from the bladder and no longer, as unnecessary length makes it difficult to streamline. The inflator mechanism must not be a high flow type as these use a non-standard connector, and can fill the wing dangerously quickly if the valve sticks open. It is easier to deal with a runaway inflation on a low flow rate inflator. A pull dump valve on the inflation manifold is an unnecessary additional point of failure.

The drysuit is considered unsuitable as the default method for compensating for weight changes due to gas consumption during the dive. Excessive volume in the suit has an undesirable effect on trim, the suit provides poor support for the back gas cylinders compared to a wing, where the buoyancy is arranged where it is needed and dumping gas in an emergency is easier from the wing as a wing can dump in the inverted (feet up) position.

=== Regulators ===
==== Connection ====
The yoke connector is vulnerable to blowing the O-ring seal when impacted against an overhead or other obstacle. As the loss of the o-ring that seals the first stage to the cylinder valve causes a major loss of breathing gas, this weakness of the yoke connector is unacceptable, considering that the alternative DIN connection is freely available and more resistant to loss of seal on impact. The DIN connection also has a slightly lower profile in the vulnerable manifold area and is therefore less likely to be impacted in the first place, particularly with normal outlets (outlets that are perpendicular to the cylinder axis, as opposed to those tilted at about 45°).

==== Hoses ====
The long hose(5 to 7 ft, depending on diver height) is required in overhead and decompression diving as it simplifies air sharing, thus reducing risk. It is always mounted to the right cylinder valve post, as the right cylinder valve is unlikely to be rolled closed by contact with an overhead surface, and possibly jammed in this position. It is optional in shallow, open water diving where there is direct access to the surface and no requirement to travel any considerable distance while sharing gas.

The secondary regulator hose length should be no longer than necessary to breathe comfortably and move the head normally, so that it is less likely to snag.

The long hose is routed down the diver's right side, tucked under the primary light battery housing on the harness waist belt, then up to the left side of the head, round the back of the neck and approaches the mouth roughly horizontally from the right side. This arrangement is sometimes called Hog-looping, referring to its association with the Hogarthian configuration.

==== Regulator configuration ====
Two first stages are used when twin cylinders are used, or when a "Y" or "H" cylinder valve is used. A long hose is used for the primary, which is mounted on the right cylinder valve or right post of the "Y" or "H" valve. The right side first stage also supplies gas for the BC inflation hose, as this side is at a lower risk for roll-off. The left cylinder first stage supplies the backup second stage, which is routed over the right shoulder and stored on a necklace, the suit inflation hose, and the submersible pressure gauge. The SPG hose is routed down the left side of the harness and the SPG is clipped to the left hip D-ring.

When diving with a single first stage on a single cylinder, both second stage hoses route to the right, and the inflator hose and SPG hose route to the left. This lets divers use all the components in exactly the same way and store them in the same places as when they use two first stages. A long hose may be used for the primary, but is not obligatory for shallow open water diving.

===== Stage regulators =====
Stage regulators are fitted with a submersible pressure gauge on a short (6 inches (150 mm)) hose, bent so the diver can read it easily, and held in place against the cylinder valve or first stage with bungie cord. The regulator hose is octopus length (about 1 metre (39 in)) and when not in use is secured to the cylinder under an elastic band. The cylinder valve is closed when not in use, though the regulator may be pressurised to keep water out before starting the dive.

==== Submersible pressure gauges ====
The SPG must be neatly clipped off where it cannot snag or cause unnecessary drag. This implies a hose just long enough to reach the waist belt D-ring on the left hip, where it is clipped, and no additional instruments in a console to increase bulk. The gauge is read by unclipping with the left hand, and bringing it up to where it can be read without disturbing the trim and progress of the diver, whether finning or using a DPV.

=== Cylinders ===
Cylinder boots may snag on wreckage or tight restrictions in a cave, and retain water, encouraging rusting of the bottom of the cylinder. In squeezing through narrow places, the cylinder boot and other things fastened to the side of the cylinder may snag on the surroundings. Netting around cylinders can catch on obstructions. As they are not necessary they are deprecated.

==== Cylinder valves and manifolds ====
Barrel sealed manifolds with two O-rings in parallel are more tolerant of minor misalignment and varied centre distance than face-sealed manifolds with single O-ring seals which are more likely to leak if impacted. Isolation manifolds provide the possibility of closing off one cylinder if there is an unrecoverable leak, conserving the remaining gas in the other cylinder. Cylinder or manifold valve knob extension operators (slobwinders) can be stiff, can trail and snag on things, and can be difficult to find when needed. Valve- and manifold protector frames are not normally necessary and may be worse line-traps than the valves. Some models make it more difficult to reach the valve, and some can increase the diver's profile.

The knobs fitted to cylinder valves and manifolds should be able to withstand a moderate impact without fracturing or bending the spindle and jamming. The approved valve knob is hard rubber or non-brittle plastic, which flexes to absorb much of the impact energy, with a metal insert, so the connection to the spindle is less likely to strip. Spring loading of the valve knob can also absorb impact loads, but only from some directions. Hard plastic and metal knobs are not approved. Hard plastic knobs may be brittle and break under impact, and metal knobs are more likely to transfer the full impact to the spindle, thus a greater risk of bending or shearing the spindle and rendering the valve inoperable. If the valve is rolled off (closed by friction against the environment) at the same time, the gas supply is isolated and unavailable to the diver. Almost all knobs are currently (2018) made of hard rubber or non-brittle plastic.

It is possible to accidentally turn off an isolation valve during a fill or a safety drill, and a closed isolator can cause problems. The isolator is normally left completely open, so the manifolded cylinders maintain equal pressure during filling and use, and are closed during an emergency to prevent gas loss from both cylinders, during safety drills, or to identify a fault. Symptoms of a closed isolator depend on which tank the diver is breathing from. If the gauge is on the same tank that the diver is breathing from, the diver may notice an unusually quick reduction in pressure, and mistakenly believe that they are running out of gas. If the gauge and regulator in use are on separated by the isolator, the gauge will continue to read the same pressure as the other tank is depleted. When the cylinder in use is emptied, the gauge will still read full, and the diver may assume that the regulator has malfunctioned. This is only likely to happen to divers that are paying little attention to their gas supply, as an apparently abnormally fast or slow depletion of gas supply is an indication that valve status should be checked, and if necessary, corrected.

==== Stage and decompression cylinders ====
A stage cylinder contains gas intended to extend bottom time. A decompression cylinder contains gas intended for use during decompression, usually a different mixture to the bottom gas. Externally the equipment is basically identical, except for the marking identifying the contents by maximum operating depth.

The DIR requirement for stage and decompression cylinders for the dive is that they should be aluminium, for reasons of near-neutral buoyancy. The cylinders should be rigged with stainless steel bolt snaps of a size to allow easy operation. If gloves are worn in cold water, a large snap is needed. The snaps must be attached to a line clamped about halfway along the cylinder. The upper snap is attached to the line near the neck and close to the tank, and the lower snap to the line that extends beyond the clamp. ¼" braided line and stainless steel hose clamps are standard. The distance between the snaps should be about 16" to match the distance between the D-rings from which it will be suspended.

The cylinder is carried clipped to the shoulder and hip D-rings on the left side, and should be held close at the shoulder and relatively loose at the hip, to allow it to find a streamlined position at the diver's side. It must be possible to cut the cylinder free if the snaps should jam. Each cylinder must be marked with Maximum Operating Depth on both sides where it can be seen by the diver and others in the team. Other markings are considered extraneous.

=== Mask ===
Low volume masks are used as they reduce drag and are easier to clear. A spare mask is recommended if the dive will be long with extended decompression.

=== Snorkel ===
The snorkel is an adjunct to diving without breathing apparatus and face-down surface swimming. In overhead diving they are considered a significant entanglement hazard and are not worn on the mask strap while underwater, as this could interfere with deployment of the long hose in an emergency.

=== Fins ===
Stiff bladed fins with spring straps replacing the original plastic buckles and rubber straps are recommended. Short, stiff blades are suitable for reverse kick and other kick styles necessary for maneuvering in a tight overhead environment and can generate adequate thrust provided the diver has sufficient leg strength. The spring straps are considered more secure and reliable than the conventional rubber and plastic straps. All aspects of fin design and construction should minimize the risk of entanglement or breakage.

=== Knife or cutting tool ===
The knife is carried in an open sheath on the waist belt to the left of the crotch strap where it can be reached by either hand and is unlikely to snag. It is a line cutting tool and does not need to be large or to have a point, but must have a sharp edge that is effective on thin lines and nets. Paramedic shears and purpose designed line cutters can be kept in a wetsuit/ drysuit pocket if there is a high risk of entanglement.

=== Dive lights ===
The basic DIR configuration includes a single primary canister light at the diver's right hip and two reserve lights clipped to the chest D-rings and secured against the harness straps by rubber bands. Lights are optional for shallow open water diving.

==== Primary light ====
The recommended primary light is a canister light with a Goodman handle light head. The Goodman handle allows the diver to direct the beam of the light while leaving the hand free to perform other functions. The principle of only carrying equipment that is necessary would make the primary light a requirement on dives where a light is needed, but not otherwise. However even in good visibility a powerful light can enhance the dive by restoring full colour at depth. The canister is carried on the waist belt to the right side, secured by a belt buckle, and the light head is carried on the left hand when in use, and clipped to the right shoulder D-ring when not in use or when the hands are needed to perform an operation where the light would be in the way. The primary light would be optional on well illuminated recreational dives.

==== Backup lights ====
Backup (reserve) lights are carried where they are unlikely to snag, and cause minimal drag, but can be reached and operated by one hand. Two are required for overhead diving. The storage position for backup lights is clipped to the chest D-rings and held against the harness by rubber bands, where they are tucked away and unlikely to snag, but remain easily accessible to both hands, and can be turned on before unclipping, so they can be easily found if dropped. Fresh non-rechargeable batteries should be installed before any dive where burn time of the backup light may be critical to safety, and burn time should allow exit from any point in the dive with a margin for problems.

=== Scooters ===
The “tow behind” scooter arrangement is preferred to the ride-on style scooter which creates higher drag as the scooter and diver stacked together present a greater cross sectional area to the water than when one follows the other, and they make it more difficult to tow another diver or additional gear. The tow behind scooter reduces these problems as the diver is towed in the wake of the scooter, the propeller is visible and in front of towed equipment, and they are more easily steered, particularly in tight spaces. Scooter tow lanyards run from the scooter handles and clip on to the front crotch strap D-ring when in use, to pull the diver by the D-ring, taking most of the load off the arms, and allowing control with one hand. The most efficient position for the scooter is at a relaxed arm's length in front, offset below so the propeller wash will not hit the diver.

=== Depth Gauge ===
Depth gauges need to be viewable at all times, particularly during ascent and decompression. They are wrist-mounted on the right arm, to allow monitoring while buoyancy is being controlled using the left hand to operate the inflator hose and dump valves on the left. They should not be mounted on a bulky console and dragged behind the diver, as this could damage the environment on contact, or increase the risk of entanglement, and require retrieval of the console every time the depth is to be checked.

=== Compass ===
The compass is mounted on the wrist, as the alternative mounting on a retractor or on a console are considered more likely to snag or drag on the bottom, thereby potentially damaging delicate structures and organisms. It is worn on the left to keep it away from the magnetic field of the scooter motor when a scooter is used.

=== Variation to suit the environment ===
When the DIR equipment configuration is used in different environments, equipment details change to suit without compromising the basic concepts.

- In cold water, dry suits, hoods, gloves are substituted for or added to wet suits
- Overhead (cave or wreck penetration) diving requires additional lights (total of 1 primary, 2 backups)
- Shallow open water allows single cylinder and smaller volume buoyancy compensator, Primary hose length may be reduced as there is no requirement for single file transit through small spaces.
- A decompression buoy is carried when there is a reasonable chance that it may be useful.
- The Diver Life Raft and Surf Shuttle are inflatable safety devices for diving where currents or distance could create a life-threatening situation if the diver is separated from the dive boat. They are intended as flotation aids for lost divers or those facing long surface swims. These items can be stored in a pocket mounted to the diver's backplate.

=== "Doing It Wrongly" ===
Some DIR divers refer to non-DIR diving practices as DIW (Doing It Wrongly), and the non-DIR-compliant divers as "strokes". The website frogkick.nl claims to represent the DIR philosophy and expresses an opinion that the practices and equipment are "faulty". This is a highly controversial matter in recreational and technical diving. Some of the tenets are logical, supported by evidence and may even be undisputed. Others are strongly disputed, and may lack robust evidence for the claims, or may be defended by inconsistent logic. Others again may be more applicable to specific aspects of technical diving, and not generally best possible practice:

The following listed practices and equipment are some of those deprecated by persons representing themselves as DIR divers and/or training organisations:

- Badly designed clips, which may rust, or have sharp edges, or may open and break the connection unintentionally, potentially losing equipment, and particularly clips that may snag a line and clip themselves on without the intention of the diver and are colloquially known as suicide clips.
- Decompression computers are recognised as being useful but are not a substitute for planning decompression and gas requirements of a multi-level profile before the dive. Electronics may fail and batteries may run out.
- Instruments mounted in a console attached to the pressure gauge, supported by the high-pressure hose are vulnerable to snagging and impact with the environment, and reaching for the console to read the instruments occupies a hand, increasing task loading. Depth and time instruments should be worn on the wrists where they can be monitored constantly during ascent without occupying a hand.
- Helmets for head protection, and head mounted lights may snag the long regulator hose which is looped around the neck and may cause difficulty changing the diving mask. Head mounted lights also increase diver profile and hydrodynamic drag, and increase the risk of shining the light in the buddy's eyes when looking towards him. They are difficult to use effectively for signalling purposes.
- Negatively buoyant steel stage cylinders can cause trim problems and buoyancy difficulty if handed off.
- A battery canister for the primary light carried at the lower end of the back cylinders (butt mount) may interfere with the diver's leg action in finning, is not as easily reached while diving, and needs a longer lamp lead, which is more vulnerable to snagging behind the diver. If the canister floods, the diver's trim is may be adversely affected (feet down), and it is more difficult to remove the canister during the dive if necessary
- A gas switch block increases the risk of a diver unintentionally switching or being switched to a breathing gas unsuited to the depth, with possibly fatal consequences, and compromising the decompression plan.
- All-metal connections cannot be cut free in an emergency if the connector jams.
- Non-standard gas connections for demand valve hoses and inflator hoses for dry suits and buoyancy compensators conflict with the requirement for all team members' gas connections to be the same, so that they can be shared in an emergency.
- Swivelling gas connections are an additional point of possible failure and are not needed with DIR hose routing.
- A Snorkel is undesirable when it has no meaningful benefit, and its presence is an additional hazard if it can snag on something. If on the head, it may snag on something and pull the mask off. If on the leg, it could snag the weight belt when ditched in an emergency, or snag on nets or lines. GUE policy has moved away from this, and while noting that a snorkel is only useful at the surface and can be a snagging hazard underwater, recommends that snorkels be plain, simple and unadorned with gimmickry, and that the diver should learn proper snorkeling technique.
- Buoyancy compensator inflation control devices with an integrated secondary demand valve
- A small writing slate on a wrist does not have much space for writing and clutters the arm. A "wet-notes" pad carried in a pocket is the recommended alternative.
- A pony bottle mounted on the back cylinder is deprecated as it is easier to confuse which demand valve is connected to which cylinder. This could lead to the diver accidentally choosing the wrong gas for the depth if the contents are decompression gas.

== Variations and schisms within DIR ==
However, as with all great movements, comes inevitable corruption and fragmentation. Today, DIR has spread to every corner of the globe, with self-appointed DIR groups emerging in dozens of different countries. Given their physical separation, their lack of centralized direction, their own specific agendas, beliefs, power struggles and constraints, these satellite groups cannot help but to promote a version of DIR that is uniquely their own. This version of "DIR" will likely have little resemblance to the original. This will be the case, however well-intentioned, however devoted to the founding principles of DIR, these satellites may be. — Jarrod Jablonski

== DIR criticisms and controversies ==
From its earliest days, some proponents of DIR have been critical of many other agencies, whose training they believe insufficient in fundamental diving skills. Although DIR system became well known in the field of long range, mixed gas, cave diving, it is claimed that its philosophy makes it both efficient and effective in different environments. This has been disputed by other individual divers and training agencies who claim that DIR is less optimal than other methods in particular situations. The British Cave Diving Group, for example, prefers to dive solo in caves, and argues that the DIR system, which relies on buddies and teams, presents problems for British caves that the CDG do not experience.

=== Solo diving ===
Some other training agencies also promote solo diving, and recommend practices that do not conform with DIR principles.

Comparison of SDI Solo Diving practices and DIR
Configuration that differs from DIR	Reason for practice
Insistence that a dive computer is used (with a further backup)	Solo diving is carried out at recreational depths with more flexible dive objectives—photography, exploring, hunting. The overall dive profile is not specific, hence constantly recalculating limits loads the solo diver excessively. Dive computers can remove this task loading and provide effective and conservative decompression avoidance profiling.
No need for the long hose	In solo diving there is no buddy. The balance of probability is that if a "safe second" is needed it will be needed by the diver. This does not need a long hose. The acceptable backup regulator is often on a pony bottle or other configuration of bailout bottle.
Mounting of equipment does not follow DIR practice	Solo diving, within the limits set for it, needs fully redundant air supply. Mounting may be as a sling mount, or clamped to a back-mount cylinder. There is no team standard with which to conform.
Team diving is not necessary	Solo diving is usually carried out with simple dive plans, simple objectives, and from a basis of having extensive experience in doing this sort of dives. It does not need a team to achieve the objectives of these dives, and these dives do not have the same task loading that must be mitigated.

=== Controversies over DIR configurations suiting the developing skills, objectives and specific risks of recreational diving ===
Recreational diving is a very popular sport, with more than 25 million certifications issued by PADI alone. The diving population possesses a wide range of skills, abilities, and ambitions. Many dive infrequently; a 1998 DEMA survey found that only one-third of divers logged more than 10 dives over a three-year period. With respect to this diverse diving population:

Situation	Implications
Skills levels and skills capabilities vary considerably in both the population and even in the single individual as he makes the transition from novice diver to a more advanced level, at which the diver settles into the sort of diving style he enjoys	Different types of equipment designs support different levels of skill and experience to provide optimal solutions - for example the BCD. A majority of diving accidents occur at the novice diving level, and many of these accidents occur at the surface. For these novice divers the jacket style type of BCD provides better heads-up surface flotation necessary to mitigate such risks, instead of the wing type BCD recommended by DIR.
DIR places unrealistic demands on recreational dive planning and monitoring	Recreational diving is relatively ad-hoc, with dive plans generally not having precise and exact depth and duration profiles set in advance. The computation or referencing of dive tables by infrequent or less experienced divers is much more subject to human error, particularly as these divers often have to deal with more complicated repetitive diving computations or tables. These sorts of errors are not made by dive computers, which are particularly effective in reducing diver risks in these circumstances. Dive computers can greatly reduce task loading and allow less experienced divers to focus on other dive requirements, such as navigation, while still providing very effective monitoring of decompression parameters. To quote The Scuba Diving Handbook "No serious diver should be equipped without a dive computer, and there are many to choose from. Diving computers probably represent the single most important advance in diving equipment since the invention of the aqualung."
Ambitions and diving objectives of many recreational divers are generally modest	Many recreational divers do not have the ambition or interest in going into technical or advanced specialist diving - and certainly not into such practice as deep cave diving. Therefore, being on a training path or equipment acquisition path that aims in this direction is misdirected.

Acquisition of dive equipment is done in phases over an extended period of time and is subject to considerable budgetary constraint. A fully compliant DIR based system costs more than a simple recreational setup, meaning that moving through the phases of kit acquisition focused on DIR approval leads to having less personally owned equipment for much of the acquisition period. It has been argued that the lack of necessity to purchase a dive computer reduces DIR costs (Jablonski: "Dive computers are expensive, and prevent divers with limited resources from purchasing truly useful equipment" "), it has also been argued that the lack of a dive computer adds to the risk of diving for recreational divers. Recreational dive equipment manufacturers provide equipment designed to provide a wide range of costs and performance characteristics in equipment, targeted at the range of uses and demands that recreational divers transition through as they acquire kit.

=== Controversy over DIR applicability to local practices in diving ===
Deep cave diving (as in the WKPP) has significant differences in hazards and environmental conditions from other types of recreational scuba diving. Conflicts occur where local diving practice experts say these conditions are so different that DIR system rationale and practices simply do not apply, and that DIR practices actually cause difficulties.

Example	DIR rationale for non-usage	Local practice rationale for usage
Need for snorkel at surface for recreational diving	The snorkel is a hazard in its potential for snagging in overhead environment or snagging on cave guidelines; Short surface swims in cave systems make snorkel “excess baggage”; Surface conditions are benign; A diver on the surface should be able to breathe from his/her primary or by swimming on his/her back	In exposed open-water diving the snorkel can be a very useful item. For example, due to the long swims involved in California shore diving, divers use snorkels until they reach a good start point for a dive to maximise air supply for the actual dive.; A snorkel can be a useful substitute for a pocket mask for in-water EAR, a diving accident victim can be towed and have rescue breathing administered without delay.; In rougher open water surface conditions a snorkel can be a useful safety device in scenarios that require long surface waits or surface swims. BSAC rate the snorkel as "essential safety kit."
Cave diving	A helmet (with or without lights) is totally unacceptable – one reason that it can interfere with long hose usage; All diving MUST be carried out as a team – solo diving is forbidden	The UK's Cave Diving Group, the longest operative cave diving society in the world, states that because the British cave and sump systems are significantly different in nature than those of the WKPP the practices and configurations of the equipment also must be quite different.; British caves and sumps are often so murky and/or narrow that divers can be concussed or suffer other head injury unless they wear a helmet; The CDG claim that the murkiness of British caves/sumps makes team diving more dangerous than diving solo.

=== Criticism arising from DIR public relations and behavior ===
The rise of DIR from a local cave diving group of enthusiasts to a philosophy of diving followed by thousands, has been marked by persistent controversy. Part of this is due to sub-optimal public relations by some leaders and followers of the movement. Those who have had the most to say in public have often been least diplomatic in their criticism of both mainstream recreational and technical diving procedure, and the more obviously loose cannons of the opposing technical diving schools of thought. The core of the controversy surrounding DIR is in the phrase "Doing It Right". If a group is DIR, then all who are not doing things the DIR way are considered to be 'Doing it Wrong'. The use of the term 'stroke' to describe non-DIR divers has exacerbated tensions.

[P]ossibly the most important piece of wisdom in the diving world, and is something we should all apply to all of our diving. It is, simply, 'Don't dive with strokes.'

The term 'stroke' refers to someone who, knowing there is a better system, chooses to dive in a less than optimal way. It applies to those instructors who encourage students (who know no better) to exercise personal preference to sell more equipment. It applies to those who don't plan their dives, dive beyond their abilities, dive deep on air, take unnecessary risks, do big dives using unfamiliar gear, or whose only reason for diving is depth.

Diving with strokes moves us into an area where our safety is no longer in our own hands. Strokes are sometimes highly 'qualified'. Often they seem very confident - usually because they have no concept of the danger they are getting themselves, and you, into. — Billy Williams. (also attributed to George M Irvine III)

This generated a lot of argument, mostly on various internet forums. Many of these arguments devolved rapidly into braggadocio, name calling and foul language. The terms used in such accusatory arguments include:

- Strokery: the condition of being a non-DIR diver; statements supporting non-DIR points of view
- Strokeslamming: severe criticism of non-DIR divers or of their opinions

The vitriol expressed about other non-DIR diving practices and non-DIR diving personalities has been criticised as having gone well beyond the bounds of common decency and proper professional behaviour on many occasions. This criticism has especially been applied to statements made by George Irvine III. Several years after defining the DIR practices in his seminal "Doing It Right" article, Irvine became involved in making a highly public personal attack on Rob Palmer (founder of the International Technical Diving Association (ITDA) and one of the significant pioneers of technical and cave diving) at the time of Palmer's death in a diving accident. The remarks lead to Irvine's status as an instructor and a member of Technical Diving International being revoked. This was not an isolated incident. The strident nature of DIR claims to correctness are much inspired by George Irvine's style, for example his attack on one of the most successful rebreather designs - the Buddy Inspiration.

There is no extant empiricism proving the DIR approach better than any other approach, and no formal engineering analysis (FMEA - as used for commercial diving) made to establish whether or not the DIR system provides improved safety and usability for all sport diving. Proponents of DIR point to the safety record and achievements of the WKPP, the 1999 GUE Britannic expedition, the Mexican Cave Exploration Project, and the recent exploration of the German aircraft carrier Graf Zeppelin by UTD divers as anecdotal evidence of the strength of the DIR system of diving, yet even under the stringent practices of the DIR system diving fatality still does occur.

=== Controversy about fundamental philosophy ===
There are strongly differing views between DIR authorities and other highly respected diving figures on the proper way a diver should go about choosing equipment in his/her diving configuration, and how safe the diver is in making these decisions.

DIR	Non-DIR
"DIR is an holistic system. Though incorporating parts of the DIR system into another system certainly benefits the latter, the result is ultimately neither desirable nor DIR. Furthermore, this hybrid is also likely to be fraught with complications Partial solutions are improvements upon an existing configuration, but DIR ultimately prescribes the most efficient system. While a transition to DIR is beneficial, the incomplete shift to DIR techniques results in wasted time, unnecessary effort, and reduced diving fun." "This 'all or nothing' view is also relevant to considerations surrounding the equipment configuration itself." ".... divers have begun to realize that in terms of wasted energy and effort there is a significant penalty for stubbornly seeking to maintain an individual “style.” Why reinvent the wheel alone when there is a proven system that ensures safety, efficiency and success in the water?" Jarrod Jablonski	"Don't be afraid to innovate and customize your package to effect the most practical outfit possible. Beware of instructors that pontificate that there is only one proper way to do something. The authors have learned from experience, and even students, that different solutions to the same equipment problem are widespread" Bret Gilliam, Robert Von Maier "If the 'perfect' system is not suitable for your environment, modify it until it is, while maintaining the basic safety elements of the original idea. Whilst you should never be afraid to ask others why they do things, one of the most dangerous things a diver can do is blindly follow another's philosophies without questioning them. As your equipment is your life support, it is vital that if you find something new which you think will improve your system, then test it first. " Kevin Gurr

== Comparisons between DIR and other recreational and technical diving groups ==
Because DIR's insistence on standardization is frequently misunderstood, it sometimes becomes a source of tension among divers. This is because some see the insistence on uniformity as an indictment of practices that do not abide by DIR principles. However, there is nothing essentially hostile or critical about DIR; in its most basic form, it is ultimately pragmatic, promoting the concept of uniformity within and among teams of divers. However, there is a certain degree of legitimate tension generated by imprudent advocates of DIR, who, having personally benefited from the system, become evangelical in promoting what they understand of its tenets. However, this is not an intrinsic weakness of DIR. All successful movements have their zealots. — Jarrod Jablonski

=== Trimix vs Deep air ===
The DIR approach requires the use of trimix below 100 feet (30 m). Most other agencies train divers to use compressed air or Nitrox to at least 130 feet (40 m); some use "deep air" as deep as 180 feet (55 m) and at least one offers to train divers to use air as deep as 240 feet (73 m). In contrast DIR promotes the use of hyperoxic 30/30 trimix in the range of 100–120 feet. This will reduce risks due to nitrogen narcosis, but helium is not available everywhere, and is an expensive gas when it is available.

=== Dive computers ===
The DIR philosophy is opposed to the use of dive computers. Most other technical diver training agencies recommend using two — a primary and a backup. Doing it Right: The Fundamentals of Better Diving page 119 lists 13 reasons why DIR consider dive computers to be bad. However, some of these appear strange - including the suggestion that they are expensive (modern dive computers are cheap, especially when compared with the cost of other equipment and diving gases recommended by the DIR approach), and too conservative (the approach to decompression promoted by DIR - ratio decompression - leads to decompression profiles of varying conservatism, but are often very conservative), and there are technical diving computers which allow the knowledgeable diver the freedom to select the level of decompression conservatism of their choice.

=== Team diving ===
Most technical diving is focused on self-reliance, and creates an emphasis on solo diving mentality. DIR is solidly committed to buddy or "team" diving. When a diving team is sufficiently competent and disciplined, team equipment redundancy can compensate for lack of personal equipment redundancy, while reducing physical loading of each diver, by ensuring that the team can compensate for any reasonably foreseeable failure within an acceptable time frame for the specific incident. Each diver must be able to manage an emergency alone long enough for the other members to take the necessary action to assist, and each team member must be available and ready to give the needed assistance.

=== Standardised equipment configuration ===
DIR requires that all divers in the team should have standardised equipment configurations to facilitate assistance. Whereas other conventional training agencies promote customising equipment for particular scenarios and individuals (sometimes called "personal preference"), DIR strongly advocates everyone always being outfitted similarly (with the exception of task-specific equipment). Doing it Right: The Fundamentals of Better Diving page 67 says: "It is the perfect system in zero visibility as well as in crystal clear water. The DIR system requires no modification to function effectively and efficiently in different environments ... In freezing water these divers use dry gloves and thicker undergarments and possibly electric heat. Cold water divers use slightly larger bolt-snaps. Otherwise, exactly the same system is used whether the dive is below ice or in the balmy tropics." This ensures that all divers in a team are familiar with each other's equipment configuration and the appropriate emergency procedures, even in a newly formed team.

=== Redundancy ===
While most training agencies preach the maximising of equipment redundancy, in certain areas DIR opposes equipment redundancy; for example, the DIR approach is against dual bladder buoyancy compensators for reasons of complexity, task loading, increased number of critical failure modes, and consequent risk increase.

=== Age ===
Most diver training agencies will train divers as young as 12, and some as young as 10 (or even 8 for pool diving). Agencies that promote DIR do not train divers younger than 16 (UTD), (GUE Rec 1), or 14 for divers certified by another agency (GUE Primer)

== Associated organizations ==
- Global Underwater Explorers (GUE)
- International Diving Research and Exploration Organization (IDREO)
- Unified Team Diving (UTD)
- National Association of Underwater Instructors (NAUI)
- Woodville Karst Plain Project (WKPP)
- Inner Space Explorers (ISE)
- European Karst Plain Project (EKPP)
- Dive Frontier Australia
- Underwater Technical Research (UTRTek)

== Bibliography ==
- Jablonski, Jarrod (2006). Doing it Right: The Fundamentals of Better Diving. Global Underwater Explorers. ISBN 0-9713267-0-3.
