= Big Bend (Florida) =

Region of the state Florida, United States

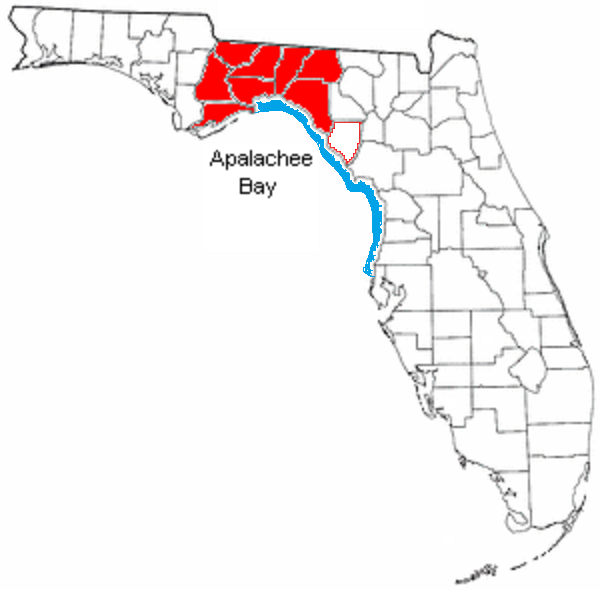
This map shows the Big Bend Coast of Florida in blue, and the Big Bend region in red.

The Big Bend of Florida, United States, is an informally named geographic region of North Florida where the Florida Panhandle transitions to the Florida Peninsula south and east of Tallahassee (the area's principal city). The region is known for its vast woodlands and marshlands and its low population density relative to much of the state. The area is home to the largest single spring in the United States, the Alapaha Rise, and the longest surveyed underwater cave in the United States, the 32-mile (51 km) Wakulla-Leon Sinks cave system.

The related Big Bend Coast region includes the marshy coast without barrier islands that extends along the Gulf of Mexico from the Ocklockonee River to Anclote Key. Florida's Nature Coast region is included in the Big Bend Coast.

== Geography ==
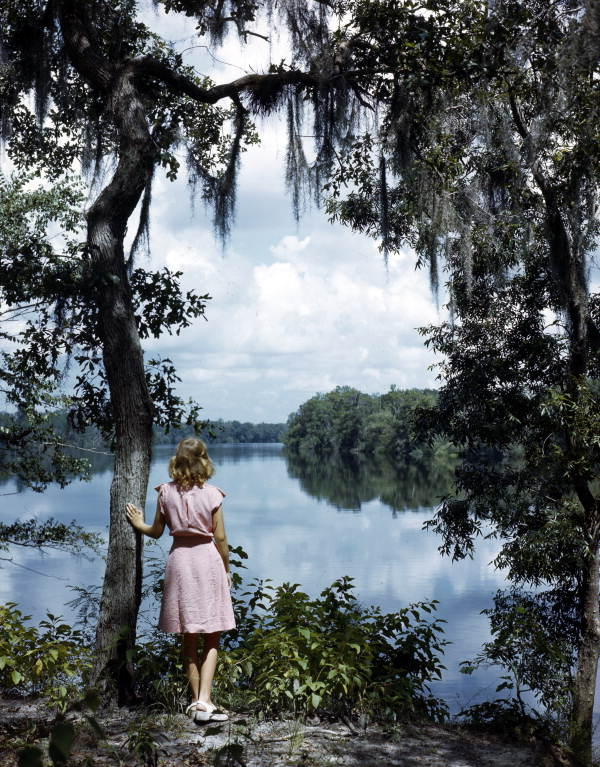
The Suwannee River seen near Fanning Springs in 1949

The Big Bend region is located at the northern end of Apalachee Bay along the broad arc of land where the predominantly east–west coastline of the Florida Panhandle connects to the predominantly north–south geography of the Florida Peninsula. It stretches eastward from the Forgotten Coast past the delta of the Suwannee River, with some definitions extending the southwestern end as far as the edge of the Tampa Bay area. Inland areas are often covered with woodlands and marshes around the southward- and southwestward-trending rivers draining towards the Gulf of Mexico. The Big Bend region includes the area between the Apalachicola and Suwannee Rivers historically called Middle Florida. North Florida's portion of the Red Hills Region is located within the Big Bend region. The Big Bend Coast either contains or is coterminous with the Nature Coast.

Coastal areas such as the Woodville Karst Plain exhibit drowned karst topography covered with salt marshes and feature numerous freshwater springs and oyster reefs. Sinkholes, subterranean rivers, and underwater caves (such as the connected Wakulla Cave and Leon Sinks system) are common. The area has little or no sand or mud. No barrier islands exist between the Ocklockonee River and Anclote Key, and the karst topography of the area has produced an irregular, frequently exposed, bedrock surface.

Due to the width of the adjacent continental shelf (over 150 kilometers (93 mi)), low gradient slope of the coast (1:5000), and shelter from the usual wind direction of storms, the Big Bend Coast is generally subject to low wave energy, but it is subject to storm surges.

The region is traversed by numerous rivers, such as the Suwannee, Crystal, Santa Fe, Withlacoochee, Alapaha, and St. Marks Rivers. A number of these rivers have subterranean stretches, vanishing into the ground before reappearing hundreds or thousands of feet away. In addition to Tallahassee, other significant cities and towns in the region include Apalachicola, St. Marks, Carrabelle, Perry, Steinhatchee, and Cedar Key.

=== Springs ===
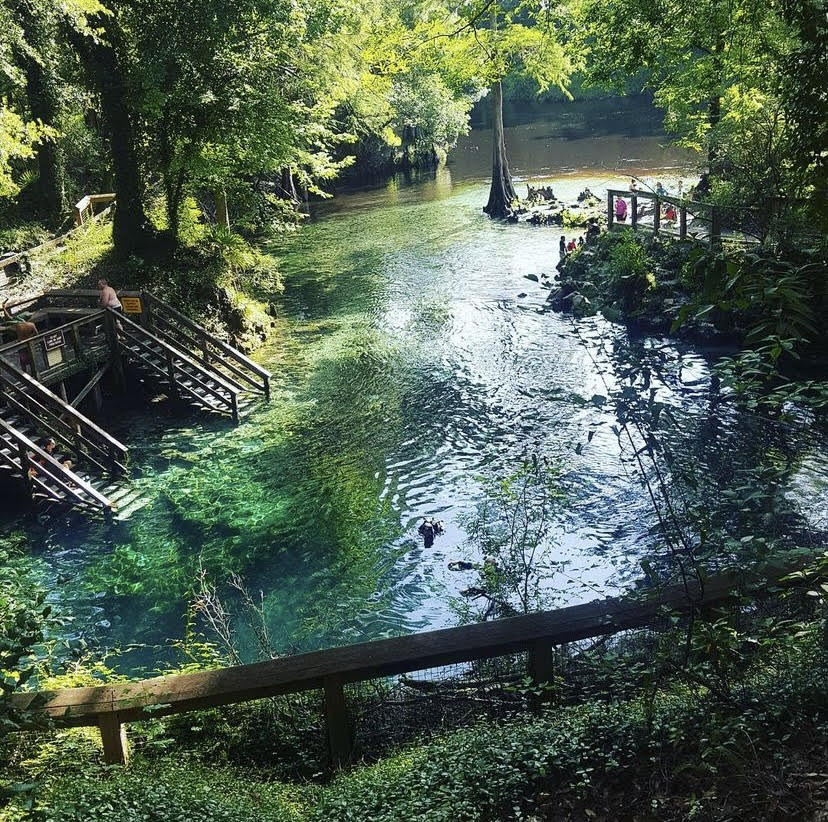
Madison Blue Springs near Madison, Florida

The Big Bend region is known for its springs. The area's karst topography is conducive to spring formation, and many of the resulting springs are protected by the state, including several designated as Outstanding Florida Springs.

The largest single spring in the United States, the Alapaha Rise, is located in the region near the confluence of the Suwannee River and Alapaha River. Other area springs include Wakulla Springs, St. Marks Spring, Wacissa Springs, Aucilla Spring, Madison Blue Springs, Ichetucknee Springs, Suwannee Springs, Hart Springs, Ginnie Springs, Fanning Springs, Manatee Springs, Otter Springs, Troy Spring, Rainbow Springs, Homosassa Springs, and Weeki Wachee Springs.

=== Member counties ===
Definitions of the Big Bend region vary, with some sources identifying the region as only containing a few Florida counties near Apalachee Bay and Tallahassee and others extending to include many counties along the coast and some inland counties as well. The Big Bend Coast extends approximately 350 kilometers (220 mi) from Ocklockonee River to Anclote Key.

Visit Florida, the state's official tourism marketing corporation, uses varying definitions of the region, including just four counties, Jefferson, Taylor, Dixie and Levy counties, in one definition, and 12 counties, including Levy, Dixie, Gilchrist, Lafayette, Suwannee, Columbia, Hamilton, Baker, Union, Bradford, Clay, and Putnam counties, in another.

Private agencies that self-identify as serving the Big Bend region often include Franklin, Gadsden, Jefferson, Leon, Liberty, Madison, Taylor and Wakulla counties in their service areas.

== History ==
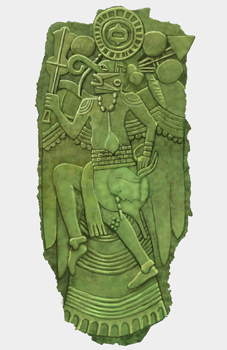
Illustration of a Southeastern Ceremonial Complex falcon dancer copper plate found in a burial mound at the Lake Jackson Mounds site

Archeological evidence from the Page–Ladson site on the Aucilla River suggests human presence in the Big Bend region began over 14,000 years ago, during the last ice age when sea level was up to 100 meters (330 ft) lower than present. Members of the Clovis culture (known for their distinctive arrow points) and Norwood culture (known for introducing pottery) visited or occupied sites in the area. By the Woodland period around 1,000 BCE, many burial mounds and shell middens had been constructed, such as at Lake Jackson. There is evidence of habitation at the Crystal River Site by 500 BCE, and the site was possibly inhabited for 1,600 years – one of the longest continually occupied sites in Florida.

The Big Bend region includes the Apalachee Province, home of the Apalachee people, the southernmost extent of the Mississippian culture. The Apalachee capital Anhaica was located in what is now Tallahassee. In 1528, the Narváez expedition traveled through the region, and Hernando de Soto set up camp at Anhaica in 1539 (driving the inhabitants off in the process). The region became part of the Spanish Empire's territory of Spanish Florida.

Spanish colonial forces constructed wooden fortifications at Fort San Marcos de Apalache south of modern-day Tallahassee in 1679, and by 1763 had partially completed a stone fortress on the site. The region's transfer to the British by the 1763 Treaty of Paris (becoming part of East Florida) resulted in the fort gaining the name Fort St. Marks, before returning to Spanish control when they reclaimed the territory between the Apalachicola and Suwannee Rivers in either 1783 or 1785. The fort later fell into United States Army and then Confederate States Army hands (renamed Fort Ward) before being abandoned in 1865. San Marcos de Apalache Historic State Park now contains the site.

The region was known as a center for chattel slavery prior to the end of the American Civil War. Fugitive slaves settled along the Apalachicola River and formed a refuge at Negro Fort in the early 19th century; when the fort was attacked and destroyed early in the Seminole War in 1816, all African-American survivors were returned to slavery. Middle Florida, located between the Apalachicola and Suwannee Rivers, had a slavery-dominated agricultural economy. Numerous cotton plantations in Leon County utilized enslaved people as laborers, and by 1860 73% of the county's population was enslaved. In the lead-up to the war Leon County produced more cotton than any other Florida county.

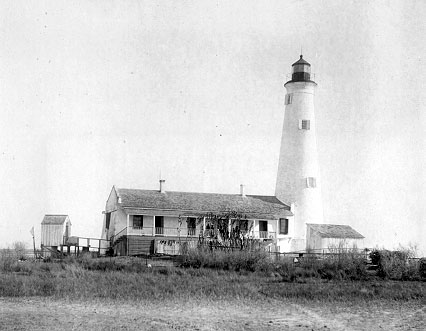
The St. Marks Light in 1867. The lighthouse is now located within St. Marks National Wildlife Refuge.

As the site of important seaports and fisheries, the Big Bend Coast saw several lighthouses constructed in the 19th century. St. Marks Light, the second-oldest light station in Florida, originally consisted of a tower constructed between 1829 and 1831; after it was threatened by erosion the surviving second lighthouse was built in 1842. Three successive Dog Island Lights were built between 1839 and 1851, with the last tower collapsing in 1873; the location was ultimately abandoned and the Crooked River Light built at Carrabelle to replace it in 1895. The Cedar Key Light at Seahorse Key was completed and lit in 1854, and is the oldest standing lighthouse on the west coast of the Florida Peninsula.

The Big Bend was part of the Confederate States of America's territory during the American Civil War. The Battle of Natural Bridge was fought when Union forces attempted to capture Fort Ward by crossing a natural bridge over the St. Marks River. A small Confederate defending force, including students from the Florida Military and Collegiate Institute (which would later become Florida State University), held the bridge and prevented Union troops from attacking the fort.

Historic industries in the region included forestry, fishing, cotton plantation agriculture, and shipping of these products (from ports such as Cedar Key and St. Marks).

== Recreation ==
The Big Bend region's forested character, numerous waterways, and extensive coastline provide many opportunities for recreation. The Florida Trail passes through the Big Bend region, including portions of the Panhandle and Northern sections. Other trails include the Nature Coast State Trail, the Cross Florida Greenway, the Tallahassee-St. Marks Historic Railroad State Trail, and the Nature Coast State Trail. The Great Florida Birding Trail contains several sites in the region.

Portions of Apalachicola National Forest are located within the Big Bend region, along with several of Florida's National Wildlife Refuges. A number of Florida state parks are located within the region, including Bald Point State Park, Edward Ball Wakulla Springs State Park, St. Marks River State Park, Econfina River State Park, Forest Capital Museum State Park, Manatee Springs State Park, Cedar Key Museum State Park, Waccasassa Bay Preserve State Park, Crystal River Archaeological State Park, Crystal River Preserve State Park, and Weeki Wachee Springs State Park.

== Transportation ==
Major highways traversing the Big Bend region include Interstate 10, Interstate 75, U.S. Route 19 (and its spur route U.S. Route 319), U.S. Route 27, U.S. Route 90, and U.S. Route 98. Interstate 10 and Interstate 75 intersect at Lake City. The Big Bend Scenic Byway is a marked route through Franklin, Leon, and Wakulla counties, and the Apalachee Savannahs Scenic Byway also traverses the region. Numerous state and local routes serve the region, including Florida State Road 12, Florida State Road 20, Florida State Road 24, Florida State Road 51, Florida State Road 59, and Florida State Road 65.

Scheduled airline service is available at Tallahassee International Airport. Smaller general aviation airports include Apalachicola Regional Airport, Perry-Foley Airport, Carrabelle–Thompson Airport, and George T. Lewis Airport.

The Florida Gulf and Atlantic Railroad is headquartered in Tallahassee and provides freight rail service across part of the Big Bend region.

== See also ==
- Gulf Coastal Lowlands
