= Jarrod Jablonski =

Pioneer American cave diver, author and previous cave diving record holder

Jarrod Michael Jablonski (born April 24, 1969) is a pioneering technical diver and record setting cave diver as well as an accomplished business owner and operator. These business operations include Halcyon Manufacturing, Extreme Exposure Adventure Center and Global Underwater Explorers. In July 2021 Jablonski launched and now operates the world's deepest pool at Deep Dive Dubai. Jablonski is one of the main architects behind the 'Doing It Right' (or DIR) system of diving.

== Background ==
Jablonski was born on April 24, 1969, in West Palm Beach, Florida. He attended Forest Hill Community High School where he graduated in 1987. He then attended the University of Florida, graduating in 1992 with a degree in English and again in 1994 with a degree in Geology.

In 1984, Jablonski took his first recreational diving certification course. While in college, he decided to try cave diving and was certified in 1989. Also, in 1989 he became an open water instructor and currently holds certifications for GUE, NAUI, PADI, CMAS, YMCA and PDIC. He began his career as a cave diving instructor in 1990 and currently holds instructor trainer certifications for GUE, IANTD, NSS-CDS, and the NACD.

As of 2007, Jablonski served as a member of the Undersea and Hyperbaric Medical Society diving committee and helped shape guidance related to diving medical safety.

Jablonski became a fellow of The Explorers Club in 2008 and currently resides in Gainesville, Florida.

== Career ==
Jablonski started teaching cave diving at Ginnie Springs in 1990 and continued there until 1996.

From 1993 to 1996, Jablonski was a scientific diver at the University of Florida supporting research on groundwater in the Santa Fe River Basin.

During this time, he also served on the board of directors for the National Association of Cave Diving (1995–1998) where he was also training director in 1997. Jablonski was also a board member for the National Speleological Society - Cave Diving Section (1996–1998) as well as serving on their training committee from 1995 to 1997. He was a member of the advisory board for the International Association of Nitrox and Technical Divers from 1996 to 1998.

As training director for the Woodville Karst Plain Project (WKPP), Jablonski saw a need to expand his role to benefit a larger population of divers. In 1998, Jablonski founded Global Underwater Explorers (GUE), a scuba diving organization that provides education within recreational, technical and cave diving. It is a not-for-profit, membership organization, based in High Springs, Florida, United States. Jablonski serves on the board of directors as the president and training director. When GUE was formed it was co-located with Extreme Exposure dive store that was also founded by Jablonski in 1998. However, Extreme Exposure has now changed locations, which has allowed for further growth of the organization. In 2000, Jablonski founded Halcyon Manufacturing.

Jablonski served on the board of directors for Florida Speleological Researcher, Inc from 1998 to 2002.

Jarrod is currently the Director of Deep Dive Dubai, based in Dubai, UAE.

=== Expeditions and projects ===
Jablonski has been setting records for cave penetration for many years. In 1995 he and Geologist Todd Kincaid pushed the Manatee Springs cave system to 11,074 feet (3,375 m). On April 25, 1997, Jablonski along with George Irvine and Brent Scarabin set a new penetration record of 11,000 feet (3,400 m) in Wakulla Springs. They utilized Halcyon semi-closed circuit rebreathers at an average depth of 285 feet (87 m). In July 1998 Jablonski, again diving with Irvine and Scarabin traveled 18,000 feet (5,500 m) in Wakulla Springs O-Tunnel. Jablonski and his regular dive buddy WKPP director Casey McKinlay set a world record for the longest ever penetration on a cave dive, at 26,000 feet (7,900 m) while exploring "Q" tunnel of Wakulla Springs. This record remains the longest penetration in a deep cave. The new record for the longest penetration at any depth is now held by Jon Bernot and Charlie Roberson of Gainesville, Florida, with a distance of 26,930 feet (8,210 m).

On May 20, 2007, Jablonski and McKinlay set off from Turner Sink to try to find a connection but were unable to when the cave became impassable after 3 miles (4.8 km). On July 28, 2007, the divers explored 1,220 feet (370 m) of new passage before discovering an exploration line from Wakulla Springs. On December 15, 2007, they completed a traverse from Turner Sink to Wakulla Springs, covering a distance of nearly 36,000 feet (11 km). This traverse took approximately 7 hours, followed by 14 hours of decompression. That dive established the Wakulla – Leon Sinks Cave System as the longest underwater cave in the United States and set another record as the longest cave diving traverse.

The Florida House of Representatives adopted a resolution in 2011 "...recognizing the Woodville Karst Plain Project for its outstanding contributions to the State of Florida through scientific research and its dedication and tireless efforts to promote the protection of the state's precious natural water resources" (HR9053). Jablonski was cited in the resolution for his part in the 2007 dive that connected the Wakulla Springs to Leon Sinks.

== Publications ==
=== Books ===
- Jablonski, J (2001). Doing it Right: The Fundamentals of Better Diving. Global Underwater Explorers. ISBN 0-9713267-0-3.
- Jablonski, J (2003). Beyond the Daylight Zone: The Fundamentals of Cave Diving. Global Underwater Explorers.
- Jablonski, J (2003). Getting Clear on the Basics: The Fundamentals of Technical Diving. Global Underwater Explorers.

=== Articles ===
- Jablonski, J (2009). "GUE's China Project". Quest. 10 (3). Global Underwater Explorers.
- Jablonski, J (2004). "Toward a New and Unique Future". Quest. 5 (3). Global Underwater Explorers.

=== Other ===
- GUE (2006). The Mysterious Malady: Toward an understanding of decompression injuries (DVD). Global Underwater Explorers. Archived from the original on 2011-06-11.

== Awards ==
Jablonski is a member of the Explorers Club.

In April 2018, Divers Alert Network announced that Jarrod Jablonski is the 2018 DAN Rolex Diver of the Year.
