= Woodville Karst Plain =

Geomorphological province in Florida

Coordinates: 30.2446°N 84.2294°W

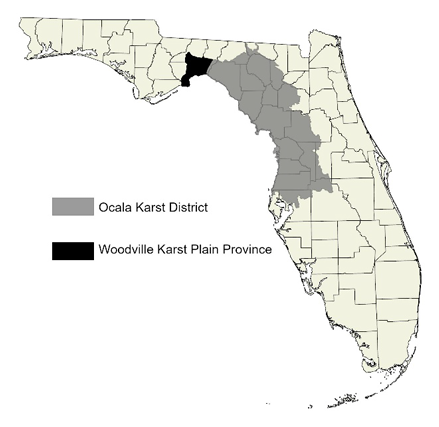
Location map of Woodville Karst Plain geomorphological province

The Woodville Karst Plain is a geomorphological province in the Big Bend region of Florida. The low-lying plain has many karst features, such as sinkholes, swallets, and springs, including Wakulla Springs. The limestone underlying the plain hosts the extensive Leon Sinks Cave System.

== Description ==
The Woodville Karst Plain province includes eastern-most Franklin County, eastern Wakulla County, southeastern Leon County, and southern Jefferson County. Its northern boundary is the Cody Scarp, which forms the southern margin of the Tallahassee Hills geomorphological province. To the south is the Gulf of Mexico. On the east the boundary with the Perry Karst Plain province follows the western margin of the Aucilla River floodplain. To the west the fluvial deposits of the Lower Delta and Upper Delta provinces of the Apalachicola Delta District are higher than the Woodville Karst Plain. Elevations in the province range from sea level along the Gulf Coast to about 130 feet (40 m) above sea level at the boundaries with the Upper Delta province to the northwest and the Tallahassee Hills (at the Cody Scarp) to the north. The average elevation of the province is 20 feet (6.1 m) above sea level, and 90 percent of the province is less than 60 feet (18 m) above sea level.

== Geology ==
The Woodville Karst Plain is a karst landscape over expansive limestone formations. The Suwannee Limestone, laid down in the Oligocene, underlies the whole province. On top of the Suwannee Limestone the St. Marks Formation (of Miocene age) occurs over much of the province, while the Miocene-age Torreya Formation occurs over a more limited area. The surface is covered by undifferentiated Quaternary and Holocene deposits, including beach ridges and dunes, and alluvium. Sinkholes are common, especially in the northern and western parts of the province. Many streams entering the province from the Apalachicola Delta District are captured by swallets. There are many springs, and the Wakulla and Wacissa rivers are largely fed by springs. There are also a number of river rises, where an underground stream returns to the surface, including on the St. Marks River, where the river is underground for 0.2 miles (0.32 km), forming a natural bridge. The Ochlokonee, St. Marks, Sopchoppy, Wacissa, and Wakulla rivers cross the plain, creating fluvial floodplains and islands. There are many small tidal creeks on the Gulf coast. Drainage is poor near the Gulf Coast, with many wetlands and marshes.

== Wakulla-Leon Sinks Cave System ==
The Woodville Karst Plain contains the Wakulla-Leon Sinks Cave System, the longest surveyed underwater cave in the United States, extending 32 miles (51 km) and ranking #57 among the top 100 longest caves in the world. The plain is home to five of the 27 reported species of troglobites in Florida and South Georgia including Woodville Karst cave crayfish and Swimming Florida cave isopod. Also of interest are the Leon Sinks.

Wakulla cave consists of a dendritic network of conduits of which 12 miles (19 km) have been surveyed and mapped. The conduits are characterized as long tubes with diameter and depth being consistent (300 ft or 91 m depth); however, joining tubes can be divided by larger chambers of varying geometries. The largest conduit trends south from the spring/cave entrance for over 3.8 miles (6.1 km). Four secondary conduits, including Leon Sinks intersect the main conduit. Most of these secondary conduits have been fully explored.

On Dec 15, 2007, the connection between the Wakulla cave system and Leon Sinks cave system was made by members of the Woodville Karst Plain Project to establish the Wakulla-Leon Sinks Cave System. This connection established it as the longest underwater cave in the United States and the sixth largest in the world at a total of 32 miles (51 km) of surveyed passages.

== See also ==
- List of caves in the United States
- List of longest caves in the United States
