= Lodge at Wakulla Springs =

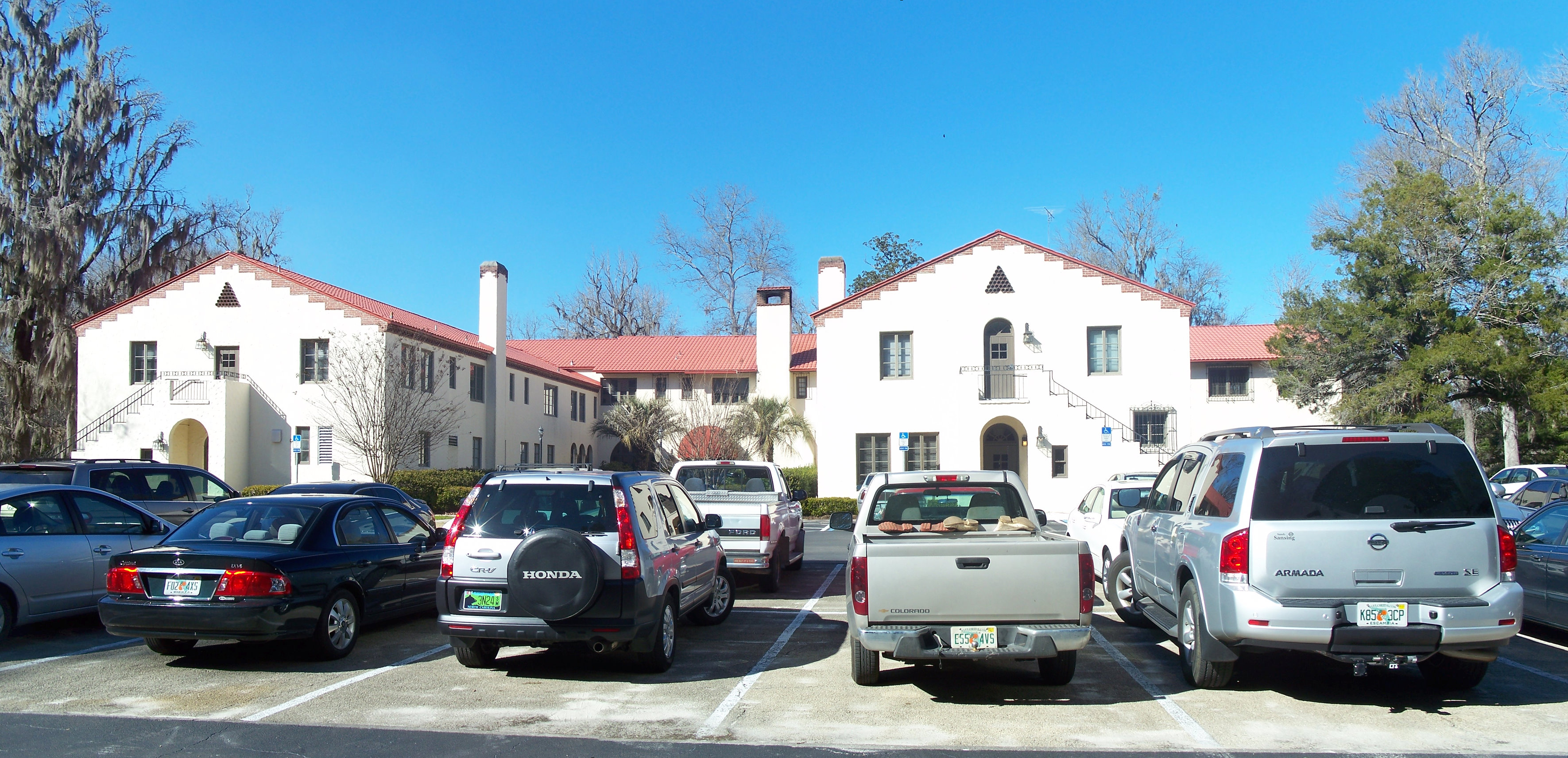
- Interactive map of the Lodge at Wakulla Springs area

General information
- Location: 550 Wakulla Park Drive, Wakulla Springs, Florida, U.S.
- Coordinates: 30.23415°N 84.30188°W
- Completed: 1937

The Lodge at Wakulla Springs is a hotel opened in 1937 by businessman Edward Ball in Wakulla Springs, Florida. It was built during 1935–1937. It is located in Edward Ball Wakulla Springs State Park, a wildlife sanctuary.

== History ==
Businessman Edward Ball, who built the hotel in the early 1930's, had purchased the land in order to keep it preserved. The hotel has 27 guest rooms, and there is only one television.

The Lodge also features the only know period art deco elevator still in use. The historic elevator has interior walls that are made of rich walnut with quarter-sewn, face-matched grain and intricate marquetry wood inlay panels.

From the efforts of lodge management, Wakulla Springs became the site of some of the filming of Tarzan’s Secret Treasure (1941), Creature from the Black Lagoon (1954), and other films.

The hotel is part of the Historic Hotels of America. In 2020, The Lodge at Wakulla Springs was nominated as "a People's Choice Award for best historic hotels in Florida" in the Florida Association of the American Institute of Architecture.

In 2002, artisans started working to conserve the ceiling of the lodge, funded in part by the State of Florida, Division of Historical Resources and the Historic Preservation Board. Each picture on the 5,800 square-foot ceiling depicts historic Floridian scenes. The techniques are a combination of many, namely European folk art with Native American influences.
