= Edward Ball =

Edward Ball may refer to:

- Ed Ball (musician) (born 1959), London musician and executive of Creation Records
- Edward Ball (American author) (born 1958), American writer of non-fiction
- Edward Ball (Australian politician) (1827–1894), Australian politician
- Edward Ball (businessman) (1888–1981), manager of the duPont trust and reformer of the Florida East Coast Railway
- Edward Ball (congressman) (1811–1872), U.S. Representative from Ohio
- Edward Ball (British politician) (1793–1865), English MP for Cambridgeshire
- Edward Ball (cricketer) (1859–1917), English cricketer
- Edward Fitzball (1792–1873), English playwright, real name Edward Ball

== See also ==
- Ed Balls (born 1967), British politician
