= Edward Ball Building =

141 feet (43 metres), 11-floor low-rise building in downtown Jacksonville

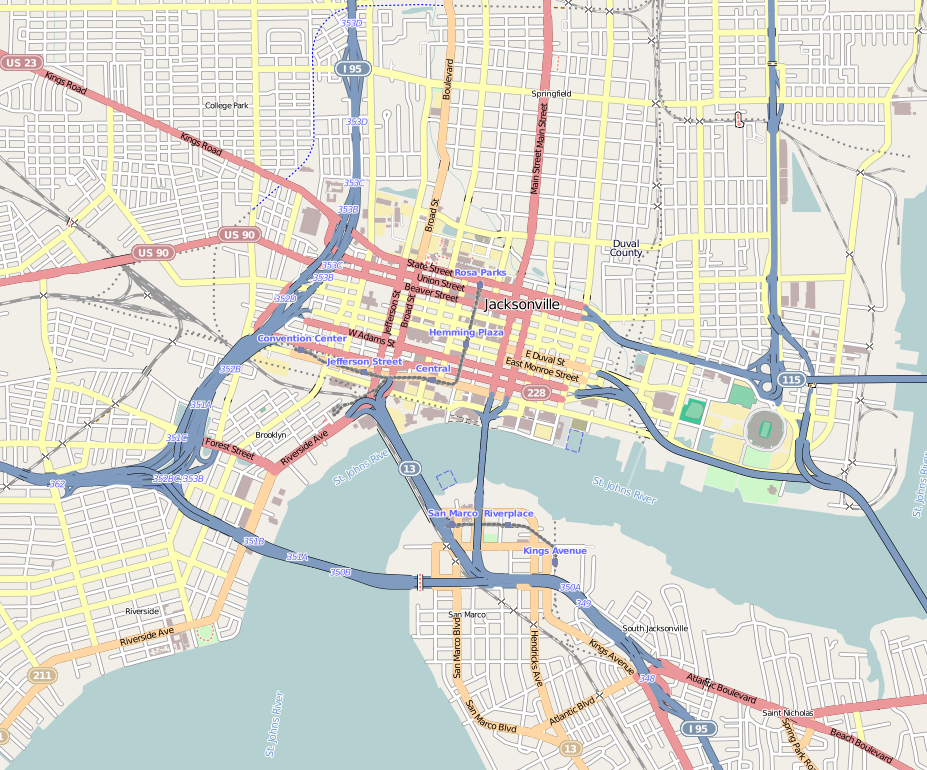
- Location within Central Jacksonville Location within Florida
- Former names: Florida National Bank building

General information
- Type: Government offices
- Architectural style: Modernism
- Location: 214 North Hogan Street Jacksonville, Florida, United States
- Coordinates: 30°19′48″N 81°39′34″W
- Construction started: 1960
- Completed: 1961
- Opening: 1961
- Owner: City of Jacksonville

Height
- Roof: 141 ft (43 m)

Technical details
- Floor count: 11

Design and construction
- Architects: Saxelbye & Powell
- Developer: George A. Fuller Company

Edward Ball Building is a 141 feet (43 metres), 11-floor office building at 214 North Hogan Street in downtown Jacksonville, Florida. It presently serves as the Jacksonville City Hall Annex, housing several departments that were displaced in 1997 when city government moved to the St. James Building.

== History ==
Construction began in 1960 and was completed the following year. It was intended as the new location for Florida National Bank which had outgrown its old facility (known as the Marble Bank) on the corner of Forsyth and Laura Streets. Edward Ball managed the Alfred I. duPont Testamentary Trust, which controlled the bank. The architects were Saxelbye & Powell; it was built by George A. Fuller Company of New York City. Ball dictated the building's specifications. The structure contains over 400,000 sq ft (37,000 m^{2}) and was constructed using materials which would appreciate in value, such as marble floors and granite exteriors, but excluded items that Ball considered frills. There were no executive washrooms and no hot water faucets in the entire eleven story edifice. The corporate offices of the group were housed in the upper floors and the bank's principal location was on the ground floor. Ed Ball also kept his personal office there for managing the du Pont Trust.

A six-story parking garage with 339 parking spaces was constructed in 1986, adjacent to the office building and accessed from Monroe Street.

After Ball's death, the building and garage were renamed the Edward Ball Building and Ed Ball Parking Garage.

== Tenants ==
Wachovia sold the Florida National Bank building at 214 North Hogan Street to First States Investors in September, 2004 for $23,234,071.

The St. James Building became Jacksonville's City Hall in 1997, but it was too small to accommodate all departments. Needing more room, the City of Jacksonville purchased the building from First States Investors in February, 2006 for $23 million. Less than two blocks from city hall, it was designated the City Hall Annex. The Building & Planning Department relocated there.

A $1.3 million, 2012 renovation affected 208,000-square-foot (19,300 m^{2}). The Municipal Code Compliance Division occupied the basement and first floors; Environmental and Compliance went to the 5th floor; Teach For America moved to the 6th floor.

Ground floor building tenants included a VyStar Credit Union, Quiznos and a coffee shop.
