= John W. Olsen =

American archaeologist

John W. Olsen is an American archaeologist and paleoanthropologist specializing in the early Stone Age prehistory and Pleistocene paleoecology of eastern Eurasia. Olsen is Regents Professor Emeritus of Anthropology and Executive Director of the Je Tsongkhapa Endowment for Central and Inner Asian Archaeology at the University of Arizona in Tucson, Arizona, USA. He is also a Leading International Researcher at the Russian Academy of Sciences', Siberian Branch, Institute of Archaeology and Ethnography (Ведущий международный ученый, Институт археологии и этнографии, Сибирского oтделения Российской академии наук; 2026- ) in Novosibirsk. Olsen is Guest Research Fellow at the Chinese Academy of Sciences' Institute of Vertebrate Paleontology and Paleoanthropology (IVPP; 中国科学院古脊椎动物与古人类研究所客座研究员) in Beijing where he is also Co-Director of the Zhoukoudian International Paleoanthropological Research Center (中国科学院周口店国际古人类研究中心联席主任). Olsen has been named a Distinguished Researcher of the Nihewan Research Center in Hebei Province, China (泥河湾研究中心特聘研究员). He is also a Foreign Expert affiliated with The Yak Museum in Lhasa (西藏牦牛博物馆国外专家).

Olsen's role as Co-Director of the Joint Mongolian-Russian-American Archaeological Expeditions has been the nexus of his research activities since 1995, even as the Expedition's geographical focus has expanded to include Xinjiang (beginning in 2004) and Tibet/Xizang (especially the Gangdise-Nyenchen Tanglha sub-ranges of the Trans-Himalaya System, beginning in 2006) as well as other ethnic Mongol and ethnic Tibetan territories in Russia and the independent Central Asian republics of the former USSR.

Olsen's research emphasizes the Paleolithic archaeology of arid lands and high elevations in Central and Inner Asia, especially that area formerly referred to as "Haute-Asie" that encompasses Mongolia and Tibet. His interests include Quaternary paleoecology and the impact of environmental degradation on prehistoric societies; cultural ecology and environmental archaeology with emphasis on zooarchaeology, especially animal husbandry among pastoral and nomadic societies; spatial analysis in archaeology, including applications of remote sensing and geographic information systems; and tangible and intangible cultural heritage preservation, indigenous intellectual property, and the empowerment of descendant communities. Olsen has conducted collaborative archaeological fieldwork in the United States (Florida & Arizona), Colombia, Belize, the Philippines, Egypt, Sudan, the People's Republic of China (Tibet/Xizang, Qinghai, Xinjiang, Inner Mongolia, Hebei, Shanxi, Shaanxi, Gansu, & Ningxia), Việt Nam, Kazakhstan, Uzbekistan, Turkmenistan, Russia (Siberia), and Mongolia (Mongol Uls). As of 2026, he has been director or co-director of 25 interdisciplinary archaeological field expeditions.

In 2023, Olsen received the Order of the Polar Star (Mongolian: Алтан гадас одон), the highest civilian award Mongolia can present to a foreign citizen. The Order was bestowed upon Olsen in acknowledgment of his contributions to Mongolian science and society extending back over three decades.

== Early life and education ==
John Olsen was born in Concord, Massachusetts, the sole offspring of Stanley John Olsen (1919–2003; vertebrate paleontologist and zooarchaeologist) and Eleanor Louise Vinez Olsen (1917–2016; executive assistant, botanist, and homemaker).

Olsen spent his formative years in Tallahassee, Florida where he lived until he moved to Tucson, Arizona with his parents in 1973. Following his early graduation from Florida High School in Tallahassee after completing the eleventh grade, Olsen attended Florida State University as a freshman (1972–1973) and subsequently received Bachelor of Arts degrees with Highest Distinction and Honors in Anthropology and Oriental Studies from the University of Arizona (1976). Olsen holds Master of Arts (1977) and Doctor of Philosophy (1980) degrees in Anthropology from the University of California, Berkeley.

Among his most influential undergraduate mentors at the University of Arizona were the archaeologists Emil W. Haury and Raymond H. Thompson, the Sinologists William R. Schultz and Andres D. Oñate, and the scholar of Afghanistan and Central Asia Ludwig W. Adamec.

At UC, Berkeley, Olsen was advised primarily by paleoanthropologists Glynn Ll. Isaac (doctoral dissertation chair), J. Desmond Clark, and F. Clark Howell, while William A. Clemens supervised his training in vertebrate paleontology. Olsen continued his studies of Literary Chinese, Oracle Bone Script, and the archaeology of Neolithic and Bronze Age China under the direction of David N. Keightley.

== Career ==
Olsen was appointed visiting assistant professor in the Departments of Anthropology and Oriental Studies at the University of Arizona, where he taught until 1982. From 1982 to 1984, Olsen was a post-doctoral research associate of the Institute of Archaeology at University College, London where he taught courses, planned and carried out research expeditions in China and North Africa, and translated and co-edited a book on Chinese paleoanthropology published by Academic Press in 1985.

Olsen joined the permanent faculty of the University of Arizona as an assistant professor of Anthropology in 1984. He was promoted to associate professor with tenure in 1988 and to full professor in 1994. In 2005, Olsen was awarded a Regents Professorship.

In 1991–1992 Olsen held a Fulbright Research and Lecturing Award at Kazakh State University (now Al-Farabi Kazakh National University; Əл Фараби атындағы Қазақ Ұлттық Университеті) in Almaty.

Olsen's administrative appointments have included Resident Representative in Beijing for the U.S. National Academy of Sciences (1990–1991) and Head of the Department (now School) of Anthropology at the University of Arizona (1994–1995 and 1998–2008).

Olsen retired from teaching at the University of Arizona in 2016 to accept research positions with the Chinese and Russian Academies of Sciences.

Over the past three-plus decades, Olsen has accrued slightly more than US$2.2 million in sponsored support of his and his students' research as well as spearheading successful development and fundraising activities on behalf of the University of Arizona's School of Anthropology.

== Principal awards, honorary degrees, and elected memberships ==
- Phi Beta Kappa Society (1976)
- Phi Kappa Phi (1976)
- Fellow, The Explorers Club (1989)
- Academician, Mongolian Academy of Humanitarian Sciences (Академич, Монголын ХУА) (1998)
- Doctoris Archaeologiae Honoris Causa, Mongolian Academy of Sciences (Археологийн шинжлэх ухааны хүндэт доктор, Монголын ШУА) (2003)
- Regents Professor, University of Arizona (2005)
- Regents Professor Emeritus, University of Arizona (2016)
- Doctoris Archaeologiae Honoris Causa, Institute of Archaeology and Ethnography, Siberian Branch, Russian Academy of Sciences (Почетный доктор археологических наук, Института археологии и этнографии, СО РAH) (2020)
- Order of the Polar Star (Mongolia) (Алтан гадас одон) (2023)
- Fellow, Royal Geographical Society (2024)

== Selected publications ==
- 1985 (edited with Wu, Rukang) Palaeoanthropology and Palaeolithic Archaeology in the People's Republic of China. Orlando: Academic Press. ISBN 0-12-601720-4.
- 1990 (with R. L. Ciochon and J. James) Other Origins, the Search for the Giant Ape in Human Prehistory. New York: Bantam Books. ISBN 0-553-07081-9.
- 2000 (edited with A. P. Derevianko and D. Tseveendorj) Archaeological Studies Carried Out by the Joint Russian-Mongolian-American Expedition in Mongolia in 1997 & 1998. Novosibirsk: Institute of Archaeology and Ethnography, Russian Academy of Sciences, Siberian Branch. ISBN 5-7803-0054-2.
- 2002 (with A. P. Derevianko, A. N. Zenin, V. T. Petrin, and D. Tseveendorj) Kamenn'i Vek Mongolii: Paleoliticheskie Kompleksi' Kremnevoi Dolin', Gobiskii Altai (Stone Age of Mongolia: Paleolithic Assemblages from Flint Valley, Gobi Altai). Novosibirsk: Institute of Archaeology and Ethnography, Siberian Branch, Russian Academy of Sciences. ISBN 5-7803-0085-2.
- 2008 (with A. P. Derevianko, D. Tseveendorj, S. A. Gladyshev, T. I. Nokhrina, and A. V. Tabarev) "Novoe Prochtenie Arkheologicheskogo Konteksta Peshcher' Chikhen" (Mongolia) ("New Insights into the Archaeological Record at Chikhen Agui Rockshelter"), Arkheologiya, Etnografiya, i Antropologiya Evrazii 2(34): 2–12.
- 2010 (with D. Rhode, Ma Haizhou, D. B. Madsen, P. J. Brantingham and S. L. Forman) “Paleoenvironmental and Archaeological Investigations at Qinghai Lake, Western China: Geomorphic and Chronometric Evidence of Lake Level History,” Quaternary International 218: 29–44.
- 2012 (with S. A. Gladyshev, A. V. Tabarev and A. J. T. Jull) “The Upper Paleolithic of Mongolia: Recent Finds and New Perspectives,” Quaternary International 281: 36–46.
- 2013 (with B. Gunchinsuren) “The Upper Paleolithic of Mongolia and Northwest China,” in Basic Issues in Archaeology, Anthropology, and Ethnography of Eurasia, Festschrift on the Occasion of Anatoly Derevianko’s 70th Birthday, edited by V. I. Molodin and M. V. Shunkov, pp. 182–193. Novosibirsk: Institute of Archaeology and Ethnography, Siberian Branch, Russian Academy of Sciences Press. (In English and Russian).
- 2015 (with A. M. Hudson, J. Quade, T. E. Huth, Lei Guoliang, H. Cheng, R. L. Edwards and Zhang Hucai) “Lake-level Reconstruction for 12.8–2.3 ka of the Ngangla Ring Tso Closed-Basin Lake System, Southwest Tibetan Plateau,” Quaternary Research 83: 66–79.
- 2015 (with Liye Xie, S. L. Kuhn, G. P. Sun, Y. F. Zheng, P. Ding and Y. Zhao) “Labor Costs for Prehistoric Earthwork Construction: Experimental and Archaeological Insights from the Lower Yangzi Basin, China,” American Antiquity 80(1): 67–88.
- 2016 (with C. Perreault, M. T. Boulanger, A. M. Hudson, D. Rhode, D. B. Madsen, M. L. Steffen, J. Quade, M. D. Glascock and P. J. Brantingham) “Characterization of Obsidian from the Tibetan Plateau by XRF and NAA,” Journal of Archaeological Science: Reports 5: 392–399.
- 2016 (with A. M. Hudson, J. Quade, Lei Guoliang, T. E. Huth and Zhang Hucai) “A Regional Record of Expanded Holocene Wetlands and Prehistoric Human Occupation from Paleowetland Deposits of the Western Yarlung Tsangpo valley, southern Tibetan Plateau,” Quaternary Research 86: 13–33.
- 2017 (edited with Junko Habu and Peter V. Lape) Handbook of East and Southeast Asian Archaeology. New York: Springer-Verlag. ISBN 978-1-4939-6519-9 (eBook ISBN 978-1-4939-6521-2).
- 2017 (with A. M. Khatsenovich, E. P. Rybin, B. Gunchinsuren, R. A. Shelepaev, L. V. Zotkina, Ts. Bolorbat, A. Y. Popov and D. Odsuren) “New Evidence for Paleolithic Human Behavior in Mongolia: the Kharganyn Gol 5 Site,” Quaternary International 442: 78–94.
- 2019 (with Gao Xing, Li Feng, Guan Ying, and Zhang Xiaoling) “An Archaeological Perspective on the Origins and Evolution of Modern Humans in China,” Acta Anthropologica Sinica 38(3): 317-334.
- 2020 (edited with A. I. Krivoshapkin, A. M. Khatsenovich, and E. P. Rybin) Current Research on Prehistoric Central Asia, Special Issue of Quaternary International 559: 1-198, 10 September.
- 2021 (with Ge Junyi, Wang Yinghua, Shan Mingchao, Feng Xingwu, Chen Fuyou, Wu Haibin, Li Qin, Zhou Xinying, Li Yan, Tang Ruiping, Deng Chenglong, and Gao Xing) “Evidence from the Dayao Paleolithic Site, Inner Mongolia for Human Migration into Arid Northwest China during Mid-Pleistocene Interglacials,” Quaternary Research 103: 113-129.
- 2022 (with K. Kolobova, V. Kharevich, P. Chistyakov, A. Kolynasnikova, A. Kharevich, Malvina Baumann, and A. Krivoshapkin) “How Neanderthals Gripped Retouchers: Experimental Reconstruction of the Manipulation of Bone Retouchers by Neandertal Stone Knappers,” Journal of Archaeological and Anthropological Sciences 14:26.
- 2022 (with A. M. Klementiev, A. M. Khatsenovich, Ya. Tserendagva, E. P. Rybin, D. Bazargur, D. V. Marchenko, B. Gunchinsuren, and A. P. Derevianko) “First Documented Camelus knoblochi (Nehring 1901) and Fossil Camelus ferus (Przewalski 1878) from Late Pleistocene Archaeological Contexts in Mongolia,” Frontiers in Earth Science 10: 861163.
- 2023 (with A. M. Khatsenovich, E. P. Rybin, Ya. Tserendagva, D. Bazargur, G. Margad-Erdene, D. V. Marchenko, B. Gunchinsuren, and A. P. Derevianko) “The Middle Paleolithic of Tsagaan Agui Cave in the Gobi Altai Region of Mongolia and its Siberian and Central Asian Links,” Archaeological Research in Asia 35: 100462.
- 2023 Editor, translation. Монголын Палеолитын Дурсгал (The Paleolithic of Mongolia), edited by B. Gunchinsuren and D. Bazargur. Ulaanbaatar: Mongolian Academy of Sciences, Institute of Archaeology. 356 pages. ISBN 978-9919-9989-3-6.
- 2026 (with A. V. Zubova, L. V. Zotkina, A. M. Kulkov, V. G. Moiseyev, A. A. Malyutina, R. V. Davydov, S. V. Markin, E. A. Maksimovskiy, P. V. Chistyakov, A. I. Krivoshapkin and K. A. Kolobova) “Earliest Evidence for Invasive Mitigation of Dental Caries by Neanderthals,” PLoS One, 21(5): e0347662, 13 May 2026.
- 2026 (with Zhou Shihang, Jin Yingshuai, Chen Zujun, Wang Shejiang, Wang Chunxue, and Zhang Xiaoling) “Early Holocene Human Occupation of the Western Tibetan Plateau: New Evidence from the Kali Site,” Archaeological Research in Asia 47: 100733.
- 2026 (with Zhang Yueshu, Li Feng, Chen Fuyou, and Gao Xing) “Diachronic Changes in Early Pleistocene Lithic Technology at the Donggutuo Site, Nihewan Basin, Northern China,” Journal of Human Evolution 221: 103901.
