= Woodville Karst Plain Project =

Project and organization to map the underwater cave systems of the Woodville Karst Plain

The Woodville Karst Plain Project or WKPP, is a project and organization that maps the underwater cave systems underlying the Woodville Karst Plain. This plain is a 450-square-mile (1,200 km^{2}) area that runs from Tallahassee, Florida, U.S. to the Gulf of Mexico and includes numerous first magnitude springs, including Wakulla Springs, and the Leon Sinks Cave System, the longest underwater cave in the United States. The project grew out of a cave diving research and exploration group established in 1985 and incorporated in 1990 (by Bill Gavin and Bill Main, later joined by Parker Turner, Lamar English and Bill McFaden, at the time the chairman of the NACD Exploration and Survey Committee).

WKPP is the only organization currently allowed to dive some of these caves – which are all on State, Federal, or private land – due to the extreme nature of the systems and the discipline required to safely explore them, although these caves were explored extensively prior to the establishment of the WKPP.

WKPP divers hold every deep (below −190 feet (−58 m)) distance record in underwater cave diving. WKPP director Casey McKinlay and Jarrod Jablonski hold the world's record for the greatest distance below −190 feet (−58 m)) from air in a cave dive - 25,789 feet (7,860 m) each way at Wakulla Spring at an average depth of −275 feet (−84 m). This record dive required more than 29 hours submersion including 16 hours of decompression (also a record). The WKPP also hold the world's record for the longest traverse between two known entry points - 35,791 feet (10,909 m) one way between Turner Sink and Wakulla Spring at an average depth of −275 feet (−84 m). The WKPP is also responsible for exploring and mapping more cave passageway below 190 ft than any other organization in the world - 108,584 feet (33,096 m). In total, WKPP explorers have mapped and explored 144,192 feet (43,950 m) as of June, 2018.

The data gathered by WKPP divers has allowed planners a better definition of what to expect from the underground aquifer system and how best to handle issues relating to such things as surface water runoff and other nonpoint source pollution issues. WKPP mapping has resulted in the State of Florida and the U.S. Department of Agriculture establishing a "greenway" surrounding the Leon Sinks cave system and a "protection zone" for Edward Ball Wakulla Springs State Park, as well as numerous improvements in water management district operations, DOT road-building, and development planning. WKPP data has been the basis for multi-million dollar land purchase decisions to protect critical "below the surface" resources requiring protection.

== DIR diving ==
The WKPP is notable for its part in the development of cave diving techniques and team diving protocols, the DIR method of scuba diving (which is the basis for the teaching methodology of Global Underwater Explorers) and the use of the Halcyon PVR-BASC and RB80 rebreathers. DIR, an acronym for Doing It Right, is a holistic approach to scuba diving. According to the DIR approach fundamental skills, teamwork, environmental awareness, and the use of standardized and streamlined equipment configuration are the primary fundamentals of diving. DIR proponents argue that through these essential elements, safety is improved by standardizing equipment configuration and procedures for preventing and dealing with emergencies, and out-of-air emergencies in particular.

== Current research ==
On May 20, 2007, divers set off from Turner Sink to try to find a connection but were unable to when the cave became impassable after 3 miles (4.8 km). On July 28, 2007, divers explored 1,220 feet (370 m) of new passage before discovering an exploration line from Wakulla Springs. On December 15, 2007, WKPP divers Casey McKinlay and Jarrod Jablonski completed a traverse from Turner Sink to Wakulla Springs, covering a distance of nearly 35,791 feet (10.909 km). This traverse took approximately 7 hours, followed by 14 hours of decompression.

Current projects include exploring, surveying, and mapping of the Wakulla-Leon Sinks Cave system, as well as coordinating between private, state, and federal agencies to help protect the flooded caves of the Woodville Karst Plain. Current WKPP exploration efforts in the Chip's Hole and Falmouth Cave Systems are also generating significant discoveries.

In 2011, the Florida House of Representatives adopted "A resolution recognizing the Woodville Karst Plain Project for its outstanding contributions to the State of Florida through scientific research and its dedication and tireless efforts to promote the protection of the state's precious natural water resources" (HR9053).
