= Edward Ball (cricketer) =

English cricketer

Edward Ball (10 February 1859 – 31 July 1917) was an English cricketer who played for Gloucestershire. He was born in Clifton, Bristol and died in Tonbridge, Kent.

Ball made three first-class appearances for Gloucestershire between the 1880 and 1881 season, but failed to score a single run in the three innings in which he batted.

Ball was an accounts clerk and stayed in that area of employment until his death.
