= Edward Ball (businessman) =

American financier and political power broker (1888-1981)

Edward Gresham Ball
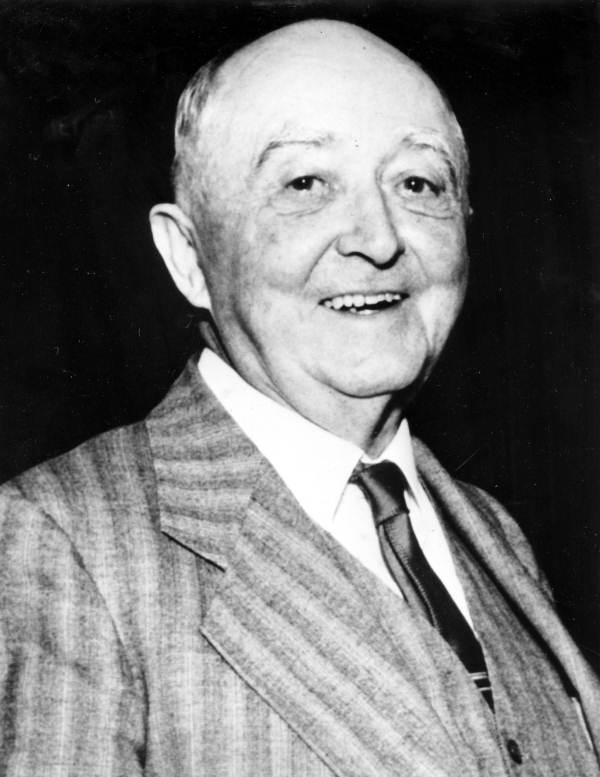
- Born: March 21, 1888; Hardings, Northumberland County, Virginia, U.S.
- Died: June 24, 1981 (aged 93); New Orleans, Louisiana, U.S.
- Resting place: Wilmington, Delaware
- Occupation: Trust Administrator
- Years active: 1926-1981
- Employer: Alfred I. duPont Testamentary Trust
- Known for: financier, power broker
- Spouse: Ruth (1933-1949; divorce)
- Parent(s): Lalla Gresham and Thomas Ball

Edward Gresham Ball (March 21, 1888 – June 24, 1981) was a businessman who wielded powerful political influence in Florida for decades. Referred to as "a law unto himself", despite the fact that he never held public office and did not own much of the assets he controlled, he led a forest products company, a railroad and owned newspapers. He worked for and with his brother-in-law Alfred I. du Pont for nine years before running the Alfred I. duPont Testamentary Trust's businesses himself for another 46 years. He founded and led the St. Joe Paper Company to become a major player in several industries in Florida. He was a leader of the anti-communist Pork Chop Gang, a group of Democratic Party legislators from North Florida.

== Early years ==
Edward Ball was born at Ball's Neck near Kilmarnock in Northumberland County, Virginia and educated in the one-room Shiloh Schoolhouse. After completing primary school, he convinced his father to let him quit school and get a job. He had always been obsessed with making money; at one time, he prospected for gold in Alaska. However, when Ball's older sister, Jessie Ball became the third wife of Alfred I. du Pont in 1921, Edward was given the chance of a lifetime. He began working for his brother-in-law in 1923 at the lofty salary of $5,000 a year, and moved to Delaware where he was publicly named manager of the Clean Food Products Company. Privately, he was Mr. du Pont's confidential business partner and became a shrewd financier and caretaker of the du Pont de Nemours estate fortune. After Jessie & Alfred moved to Florida in 1926, Edward joined them.

== du Pont's death ==
When Alfred died in 1935, his estate was valued at over $56 million, which, after estate taxes of $30 million, left $26 million. Alfred's will named Jessie as the principal trustee, but in reality, she deferred business decisions to her brother, Edward, who took control of the assets of the testamentary trusts, which included large Florida landholdings and industrial interests, including the Florida East Coast Railway. Jessie preferred to handle the philanthropic activities of the trust while Edward concentrated on making money.

== Power ==
Ball had no interest in running for office and little desire for material things; for most of his life, he didn't even own an automobile. Ball used various means to acquire enormous unofficial political power in Florida. He amassed a wide network of connections, and was the key figure in a group of 20 rural, conservative, north Florida politicians that controlled Florida from the 1930s to the 1960s called the Pork Chop Gang that spawned Florida's version of McCarthyism. Their public spokesman was Florida Senate President Charley Eugene Johns from Starke. The coalition supported racial segregation (which was practiced at the St. Joe Paper Mill) and was known for toasting "Confusion to the Enemy!" with Jack Daniel's whiskey.

Ball rarely, if ever, took a public role in politics. With control over the vast du Pont business empire, he exerted political influence through his Florida banking empire, his ownership of numerous Florida newspapers, and by funneling unregulated and unreported cash to political operatives. Ball did not need to get his hands dirty or risk personal resources. Ball was a main (but not the only) financer of the defeat of Claude Pepper in his bid for reelection to the United States Senate in 1950. Pepper's liberalism and Ball's conservatism feuded through much of the 1940s and 1950s, prompting a book to be written in 2000: Claude Pepper and Ed Ball: Politics, Purpose, and Power.

According to a 1979 article in The New York Times, Edward Ball at various times was called a Robber Baron and a political power broker; a clever man with a dollar and a dangerous man to cross; a courtly Virginian with the ladies and a ruthless foe. He is known for "orneriness" but insists his reputation is undeserved; he claims he was just a trusted functionary who did his best for the institution he served. Critics say he hijacked the trust as a tool of his personal power, treating the assets like a miser hoarding every coin. He had the reputation of a "tart-tongued, hard-nosed conservative financier".

== Personal life ==
By all accounts, Edward Ball took little time for a personal life. Early on, he travelled constantly, scouting for possible acquisitions and checking up on existing assets.

=== Marriage ===
Ball married in 1933, but the union did not last. He approached marriage like a business deal and wanted everything in writing. The prenuptial agreement had 19 provisions which described the couple's wedded lifestyle and included a definition of "nagging". Ball wanted children, but his wife was unable to get pregnant due to reproductive problems several years before their wedding. Ruth Ball filed for divorce in 1943, but Edward Ball sought an annulment, unsuccessfully appealing it all the way to the Florida Supreme Court. He finally agreed to pay his ex-wife $250,000 alimony in 1949.

=== Habits ===
In an interview, Ball said, "I suppose some people might call me tight with a dollar." The stories of Ball's frugal nature border on the legendary. Ed Ball owned a country estate called Southwood Farm outside of Tallahassee, but for years lived in a hotel room at the Robert Meyer Hotel across the street from his office in the Florida National Bank Building in Jacksonville. This was the site of a 5:30 weekday ritual for Mr. Ball, his business associates and buddies. Cocktails began when everyone was present, and lasted until the network news began at 6:00 pm, at which time all conversation and movement ceased. Ed Ball took his news seriously. After the news concluded, the group moved to the River Club for dinner.

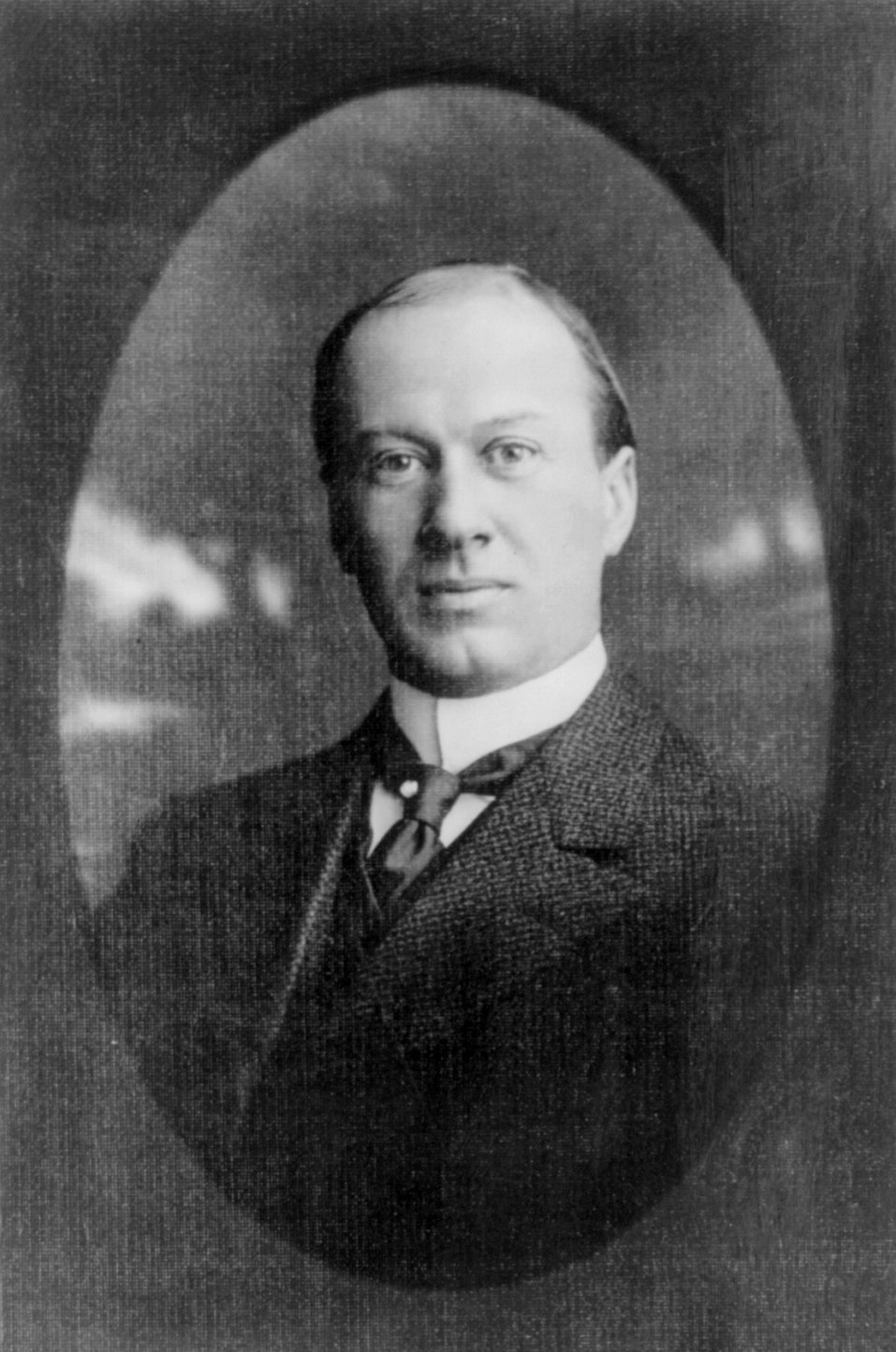
Alfred du Pont, Ball's mentor

== Banking ==
Alfred du Pont acquired a major interest in Florida National Bank (founded 1905) of Jacksonville shortly after arriving in Florida in the mid-1920s. Other banks were gradually added into what became the Florida National Group, which was one of the strongest banks in the state. In size, the branches eventually numbered 185, second only to Barnett Bank.

Ball built the Florida National Bank building at 214 North Hogan Street in Jacksonville in 1961. The structure was eleven stories tall and contained the corporate offices for the bank. Ed Ball also kept his principal office there for managing the du Pont Trust. After Ball's death, the structure was renamed the Ed Ball Building.

On March 7, 1989, First Union Corporation, based in Charlotte, North Carolina, announced that it would acquire Florida National Banks in a deal worth $849 million. The transaction occurred the following year.

== Paper Mill ==
In anticipation of increased trade through the Panama Canal, the Apalachicola Northern Railroad was built from Chattahoochee to Port St. Joe in 1910 with plans to load large ships with goods to be taken through the canal, advertised as the “Panama Route”. When the depression hit, business dropped off and the railroad was in bad shape financially. Alfred I. DuPont purchased the struggling railroad in 1933 and created the St. Joe Paper Company. Dupont drew up elaborate plans for the development of his mill town as “The Model City of the South”, and then died. Ed Ball took control of the company in 1935 but never acted on the master city plan.

Construction began in 1936 and from 1938 to 1996, the company operated a paper mill at Port St. Joe, Florida. The company invigorated the local economy following the depression, employing thousands and paying good wages, but wreaked havoc on the environment. The mill released sulfurous exhaust and dioxin, a byproduct of the paper bleaching process that is a carcinogen. By the 1950s, the company was drawing 35 million US gallons (130,000 m^{3}) of water a day from the Floridan aquifer, seriously depleting the water table. St. Joe Paper also clear-cut millions of acres of old growth forest, engaging in silviculture to replant the areas with slash pine. The practice decimated the native longleaf pine stands, reducing the species to "2 percent of its former range." Because of this, the United States Department of the Interior designated parts of the region a Critically Endangered Ecosystem.

Under Ball, the company also kept workers at the mill racially segregated.

Ball continued the trust's aggressive land purchases throughout the 1940s and 1950s, sometimes for "mere dollars an acre" and landholdings reached 1,200,000 acres (4,900 km^{2}). Most of the land was situated between Tallahassee and Pensacola, but there was substantial acreage in southern Georgia. The paper mill was most profitable in the 1960s, with products being directly marketed to company-owned box plants.

== Lodge at Wakulla Springs ==
Wakulla Springs is one of the deepest and largest freshwater springs in the world. Ball purchased 4,000 acres (16 km^{2}) surrounding Wakulla Springs in 1937 and constructed the Lodge at Wakulla Springs as a guest house. He imported marble and tile and hired craftsmen and artisans who built everything needed for the lodge on-site. Blacksmiths, millwrights, masons, stone cutters, painters, and artists created an elegant retreat using iron and stone; the high ceilings were painted with murals. There are 27 unique guestrooms, each with a voluminous marble bathroom, walk-in closet, and antique or period furniture.

Ball dynamited parts of the Wakulla River to open the way for boats bringing his guests to the springs, then fenced off the water passage to keep out the "riff-raff".

At the time the Lodge was built no telephone service was available in Wakulla County, so Ball ran a line through the forest from his base in distant (89 miles) Port St. Joe.

In the mid-1960s, he donated land to Florida State University for a marine laboratory, which was completed in 1968 and named in his honor. Ball then sold the remaining land surrounding Wakulla Springs to the state of Florida, who created Edward Ball Wakulla Springs State Park.

== Railroads ==
The Stock Market Crash of 1929 and subsequent Great Depression were particularly hard on the Florida East Coast Railway (FEC). The railroad declared bankruptcy and was in receivership by September 1931, just 18 years after Henry Morrison Flagler's death. Bus service began to be substituted for trains on the branches in 1932, and the Key West Extension was abandoned after the Labor Day Hurricane of 1935. However, streamliners terminating in Miami nevertheless plied the rails between 1939 and 1968, including such famous trains as The Champion and The Florida Special jointly operated with the Atlantic Coast Line. Adding to the woes was the Cuban embargo, thus reducing a significant portion of FEC's revenue.

In 1961, Ball purchased a majority ownership of FEC for the DuPont Trusts, allowing the FEC to emerge from bankruptcy. That same year, a labor contract negotiation turned sour, leading to a prolonged work stoppage by non-operating unions beginning January 23, 1963, and whose picket lines were honored by the operating unions (the train crews).

Arguably the most noteworthy chapter in Ball's business career was his battle against the railroad unions in the Florida East Coast Railway strike of 1963 to 1977. In order to try to save the railroad from its three decades-long state of bankruptcy, which if allowed to continue would have threatened the railroad with physical deterioration and even partial abandonment, Ball fought for the company's right to engage in its own contract negotiations with the railroad unions rather than accept an industrywide settlement that Ball thought would include featherbedding and wasteful work rules. His use of replacement workers to keep the railroad running during the strike led to violence by strikers that included shootings and bombings. Eventually, Federal intervention helped quell the violence, and the railroad's right to operate during the strike with replacement workers was affirmed by the United States Supreme Court. As the strike continued, the Florida East Coast took numerous steps to improve its physical plant, install various forms of automation, and drastically cut labor costs, all to an extent that most other railroads would not succeed in matching until years later. Ball therefore was a pioneer in the American railroad industry's struggle, beginning in the 1960s, to improve its economic efficiency.

Ball's tenure saw the permanent end of FEC's passenger service. The FEC was forced to resume carrying passengers two years after the strike began, when the courts ruled the FEC corporate charter mandated that the railroad carry passengers as well as freight. In response, Ball instituted a bare-bones passenger service with only a box lunch for food and no baggage, which lasted until 1968.

sister Jessie Ball du Pont

== Jessie's death ==
After his sister died in 1970, Ball came under strong criticism for reinvesting the trust's income to build up their value instead of fully respecting the requirements of du Pont's will, which stipulated that after Jessie Ball du Pont's death, trust income was to be used to aid the Nemours Foundation in caring for crippled children and indigent elderly in Delaware. Ball ignored the criticism, but he couldn't ignore the wave of lawsuits that were brought by other trustees, the State of Delaware and others.

== Biographies ==
In 1976, Raymond K. Mason collaborated with Virginia Harrison to author a book about the life of Edward Ball, Confusion to the Enemy : A Biography of Edward Ball. This book was the "authorized" biography, whereas the book, Ed Ball: Confusion to the Enemy by Leon Odell Griffith, published the previous year, was done by an outsider. Both were published prior to Ball's death.

== Death ==
Ed Ball's favorite euphemism for death was "going across the creek", a reference he learned from Alfred du Pont. Three sides of the DuPont gunpowder mills were made of stone; the side closest to the creek with the water wheel was built of wood. If the powder accidentally exploded, the wooden wall acted as a safety valve so whole building would not collapse on the men inside. Unfortunately, if you were between the explosion and the wooden wall, you would be blown "across the creek" and probably die. In a New York Times interview two years before his passing, he said that his life had been long and the critics be damned; he lived it the best way he could.

"When I go across the creek, it will be because I can't help myself or can't work any longer." Shortly before his death, he said, "I waited until I was too old to decide what to do with my own personal assets and have decided that I worked most of my business life managing the duPont estate."

Ball said he was very proud of what duPont had established in the Nemours Foundation, and upon his death, save a few minor bequests, he left his entire estate to the Foundation, with one stipulation – his bequest could be used in Florida only."

Ball died at the Ochsner Foundation Hospital in New Orleans, Louisiana, on June 24, 1981, from cardio-pulmonary disease and kidney failure; he had a history of heart problems and had suffered four previous heart attacks. When he died, the value of the du Pont trust had ballooned to $2 billion. His late sister's foundation, the Jessie Ball duPont Fund, had assets of $75 million. Ball's own estate was estimated to be worth $75–200 million.

== Legacy ==
- His name is prefixed to the Edward Ball Wakulla Springs State Park.
- There is an Edward Ball Building in Jacksonville, Florida.
- There is an Edward Ball room at Gulf Coast State College in Panama City, Florida.
- There is an Edward Ball Nature Trail in Thompson Bayou, a natural area of the campus of the University of West Florida in Pensacola
