= Wakulla River =

River in Florida, United States of America

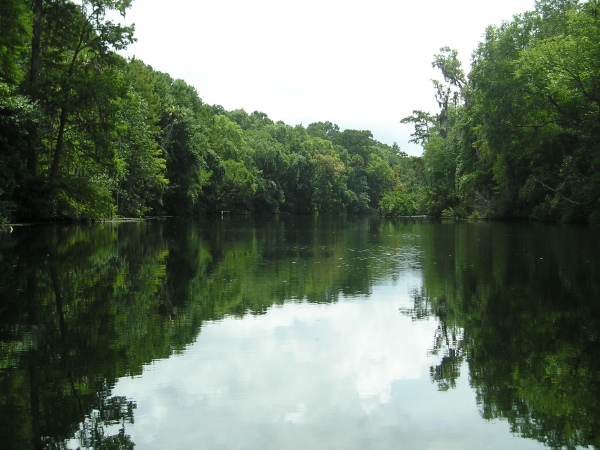
- Wakulla River between the Upper and Lower Bridges.

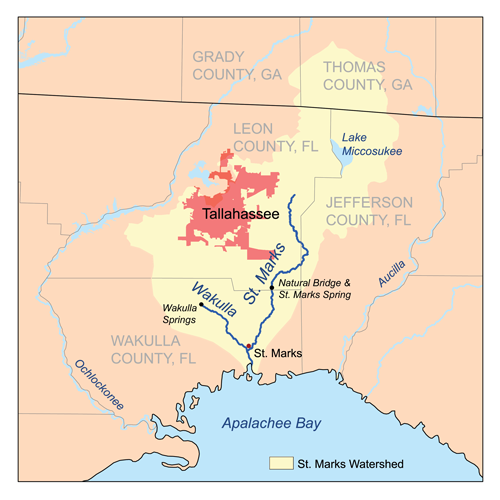
- St. Marks River watershed

Location
- Country: United States
- State: Florida
- County: Wakulla
- District: NWFWMD

Physical characteristics
- Source: Wakulla Springs
  - location: Wakulla Springs State Park
  - coordinates: 30°14′01″N 84°18′19″W
- Mouth: St. Marks River
  - location: St. Marks, Florida
  - coordinates: 30°8′58″N 84°12′40″W
- Length: 11 mi (18 km)

The Wakulla River is an 11-mile-long (18 km) river in Wakulla County, Florida. It carries the outflow from Wakulla Springs, site of the Edward Ball Wakulla Springs State Park, to the St. Marks River 3 miles (5 km) north of the Gulf of Mexico. Its drainage basin extends northwest into Leon County, including Munson Slough, and may extend as far north as the Georgia border.

The river, due to its clear, clean water, was once used to film underwater scenes during north Florida's cinema boom. Movies filmed in Wakulla Springs and river include several Tarzan movies, starring Johnny Weissmuller, and Creature from the Black Lagoon.

== Etymology ==
The name Wakulla is from Guacara. Guacara is a Spanish phonetic spelling of an original Indian name, and Wakulla is a Muskhogean pronunciation of Guacara. The Spanish Gua is the equivalent of the Creek wa, and as the Creek alphabet does not exhibit an "R" sound, the second element cara would have been pronounced kala by the Creeks. The Creek voiceless "L" is always substituted for the Spanish "R". Thus the word Guacara was pronounced Wakala by the Seminoles who are Muskhogean in their origin and language. In the 17th century the Spanish also used the name "Guacara River" for what is now called the Suwannee River. Boyd et al. suggest that the common name of the two rivers is related to the fact that both are the products of solution topography, and that both are fed by springs.

Since Wakulla was probably a Timucuan word, it is unlikely that its meaning will ever be known. It may contain the word kala which signified a "spring of water" in some Indian dialects, but not in the Timucuan language. Timucuan cala meant "to cut or shave", "to freeze to death", or "fruit".

== Navigation ==
The Wakulla River Canoe Trail runs for approximately 4 miles (6.4 km), between the Upper and Lower Bridges. Access to the river north of the Upper Bridge is blocked by a chain-link fence erected by Ed Ball in the 1930s; challenged in court, its legality was upheld when the river above it was found by a court to be non-navigable.

== List of crossings ==
Crossing	Carries	Image	Location	Coordinates
Headwaters				30°15′03″N 84°19′20″W
	CR 61; Wakulla Springs Road		Wakulla Springs	30°14′32″N 84°18′45″W
	Wakulla Park Drive		Wakulla Springs	30°14′31″N 84°18′40″W
Wakulla Springs				30°14′12″N 84°18′06″W
Upper Bridge	CR 365; Shadeville Highway		Wakulla Station	30°12′49″N 84°15′41″W
Lower Bridge	US 98; Coastal Highway		St. Marks	30°10′32″N 84°14′43″W
Mouth				30°08′58″N 84°12′40″W
