= Forest Capital Museum State Park =

State park in Florida, United States

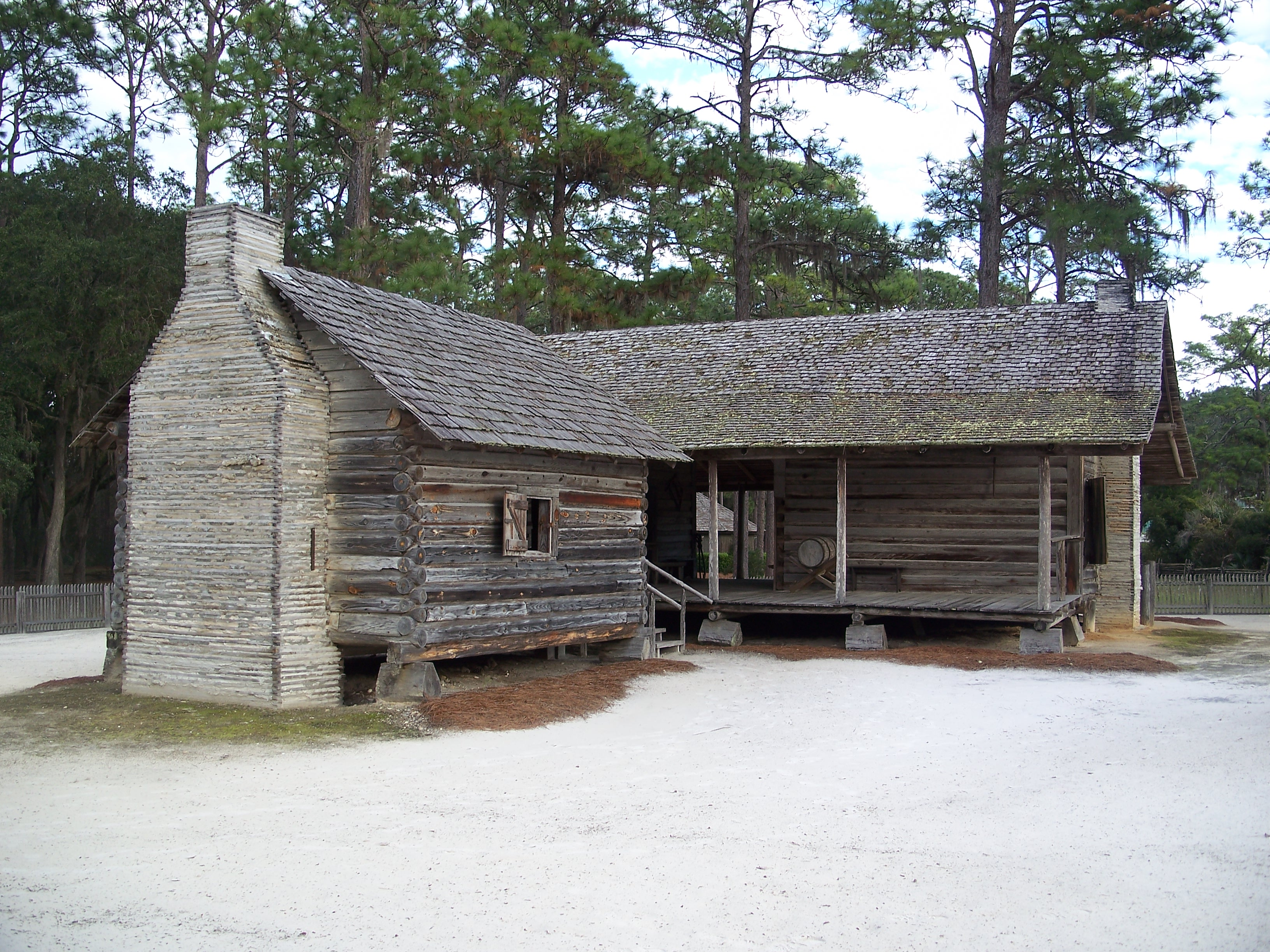
- Part of Cracker Homestead reconstruction

- Location within Florida Location within the United States
- Interactive map of Forest Capital Museum State Park
- Location: Taylor County, Florida, USA
- Nearest city: Perry, Florida
- Coordinates: 30.0803°N 83.5683°W
- Area: 13 acres (5.3 ha)
- Governing body: Florida Department of Environmental Protection

Forest Capital State Museum is a 13-acre (5.3 ha) Florida State Park located 1-mile (1.6 km) south of Perry on US 19/US 98. The museum contains displays that recount the history of the forest industry as well as the wildlife of the forest. Adjacent to the museum is the Cracker Homestead built in 1864 that depicts life on a Florida homestead with a house, barn, well, arbor, and garden. The park also hosts the annual Florida Forest Festival event in October, which is a 50+ year tradition.

== Recreational activities ==
Activities include picnicing and viewing the exhibits. The park has three covered picnic pavilions. There is also a playground located in the park.

The museum displays a diorama of a turpentine still, historic turpentine tools, and photographs of early logging operations. It also contains a map of Florida made from 67 species of native wood.

== Hours ==
The park is open every Thursday through Monday from 9 a.m. to 12 p.m. and from 1 p.m. to 5 p.m., except Thanksgiving, Christmas and New Year's Day.

== Gallery ==
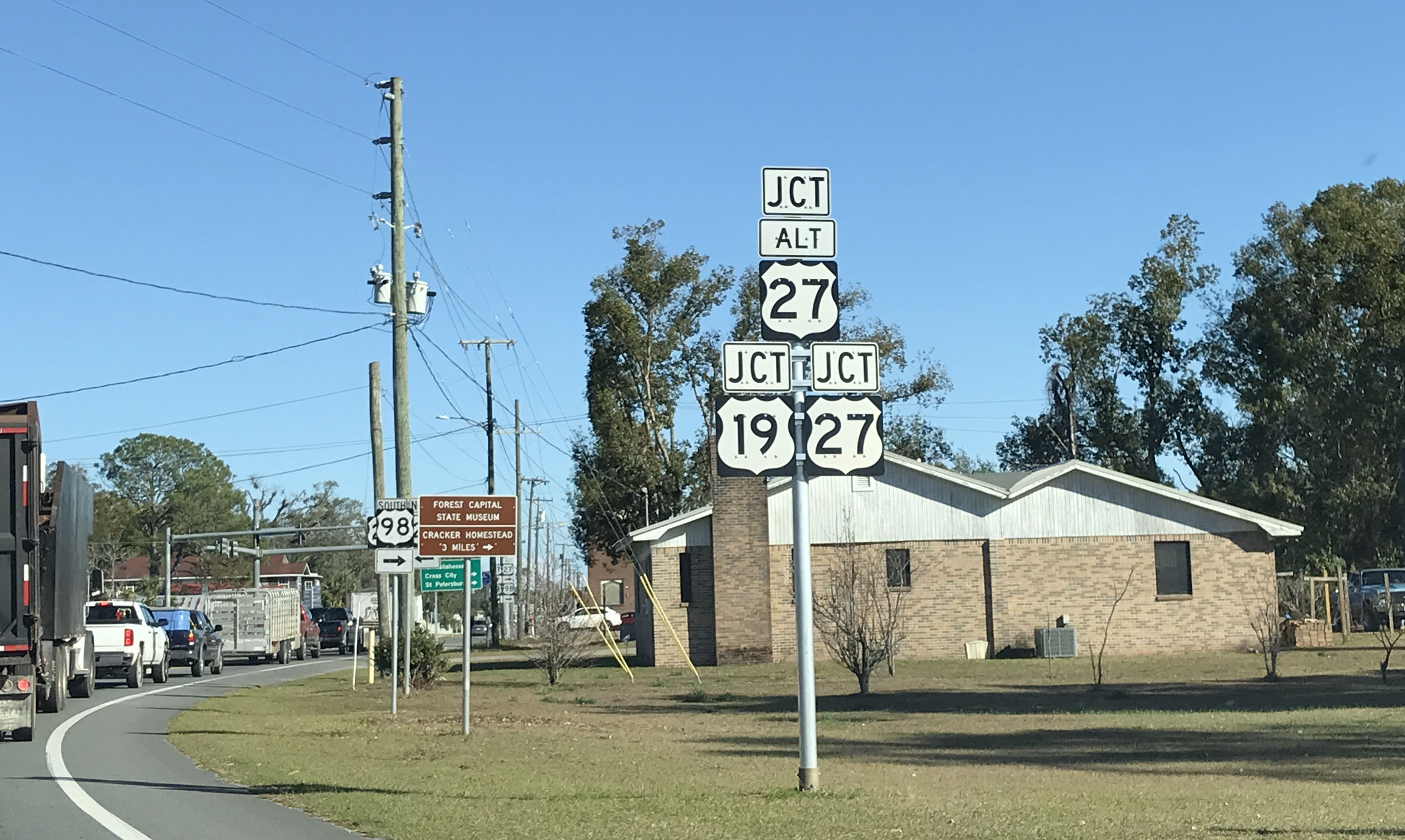
Road sign for Capital State Museum near Perry

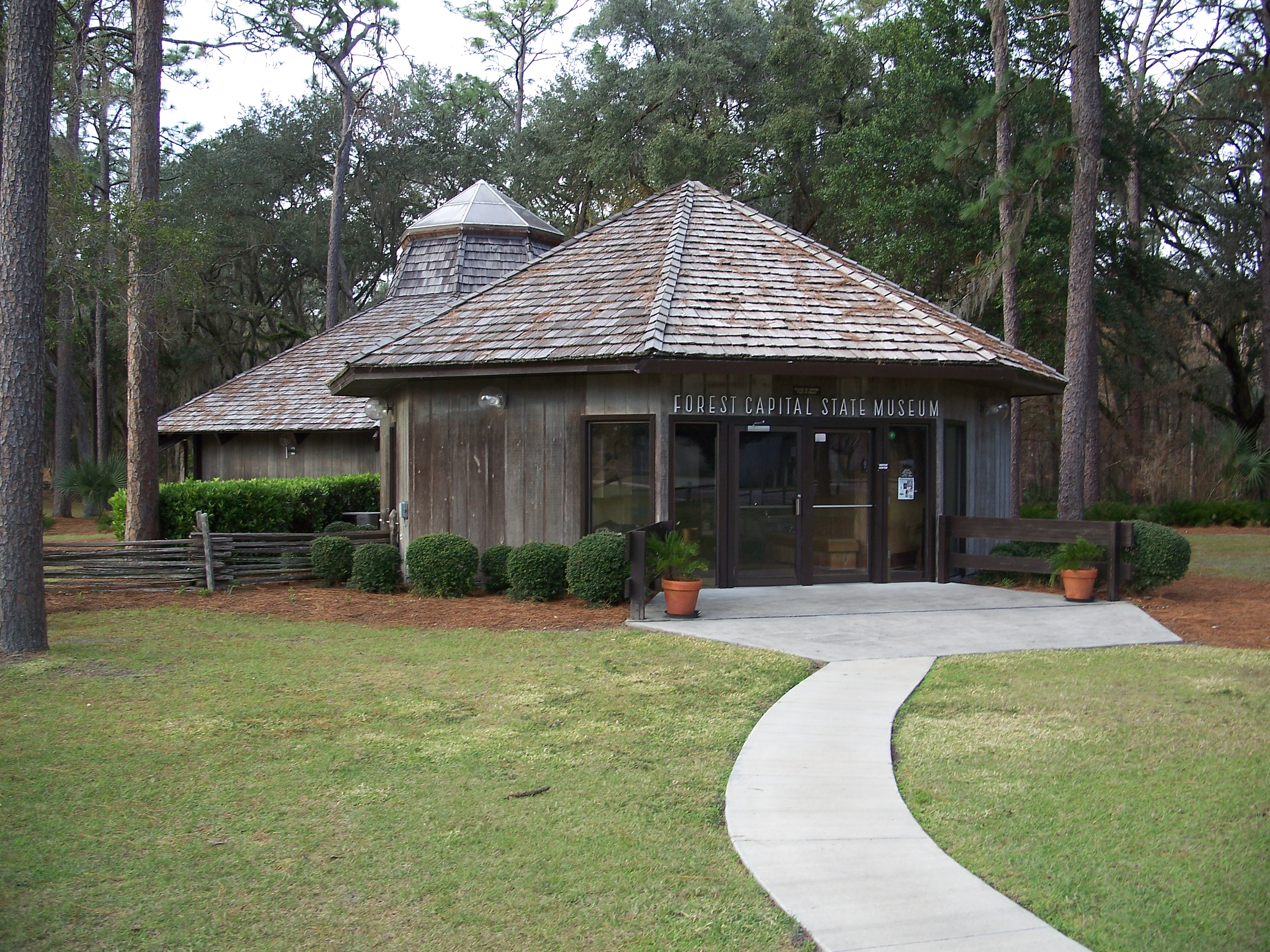
Museum building

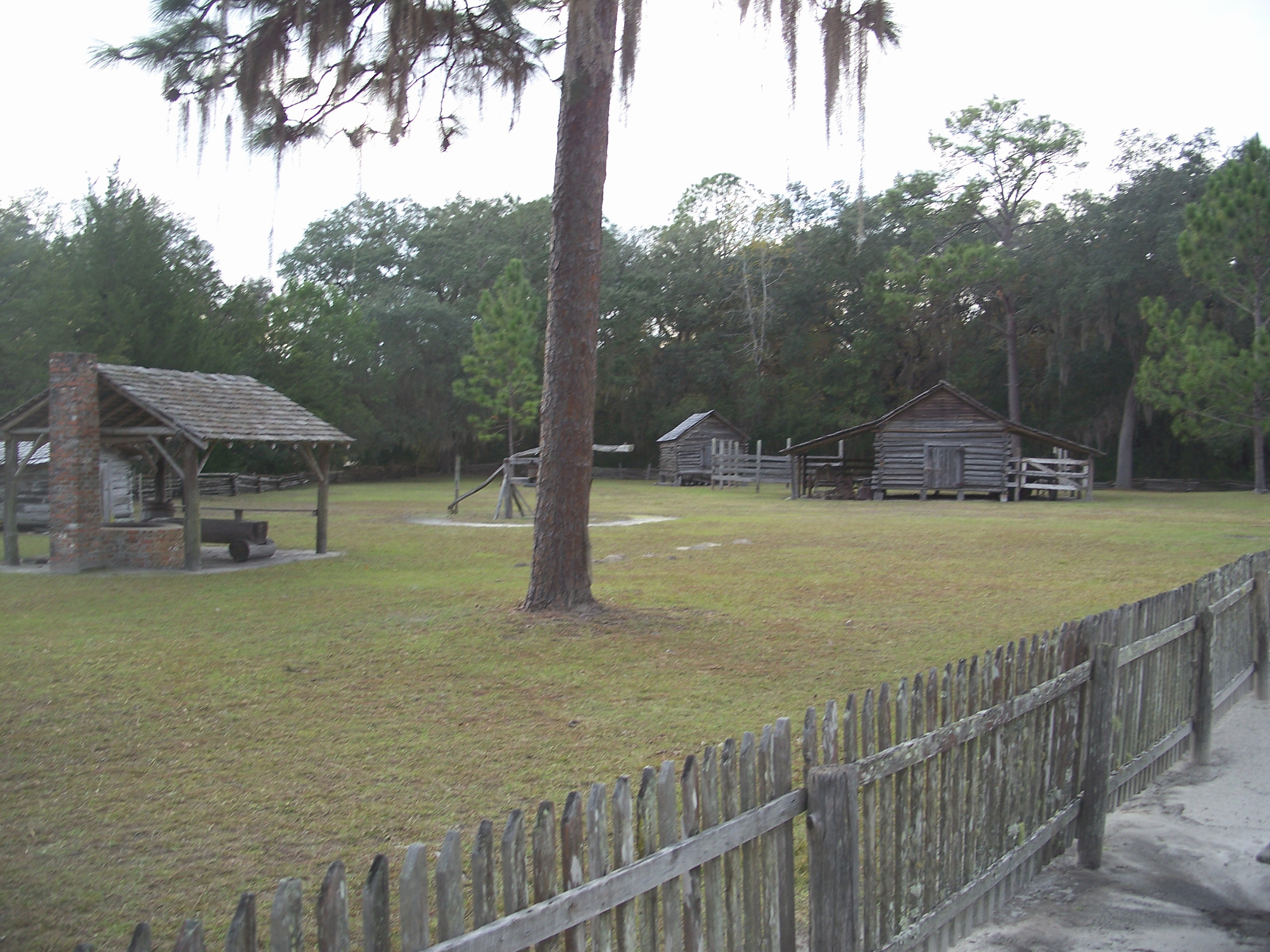
Part of Cracker Homestead reconstruction
