= Alapaha Rise =

Natural spring in Florida, US

Coordinates: 30.438673°N 83.089593°W

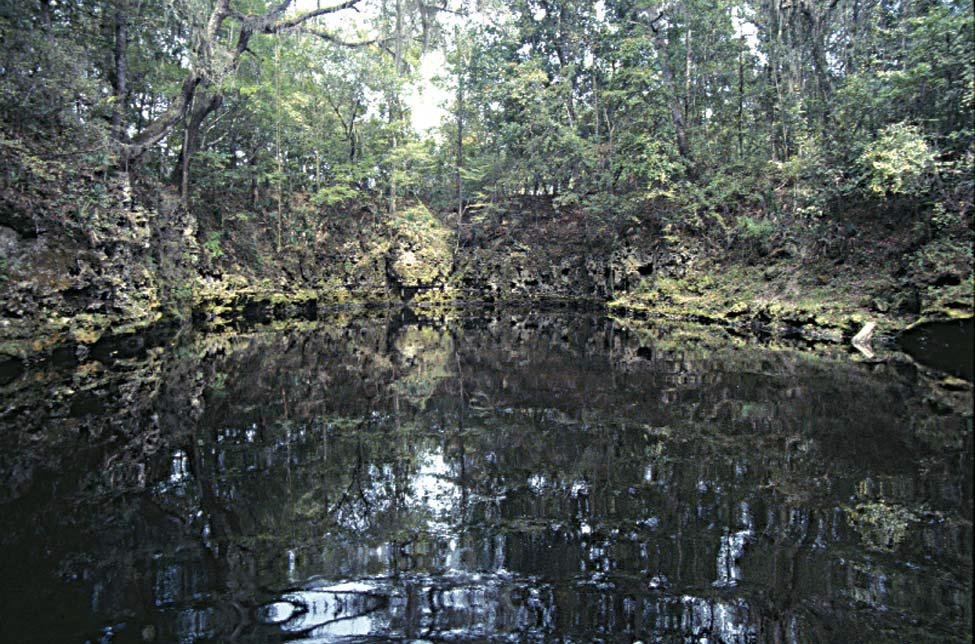
Alapaha Rise

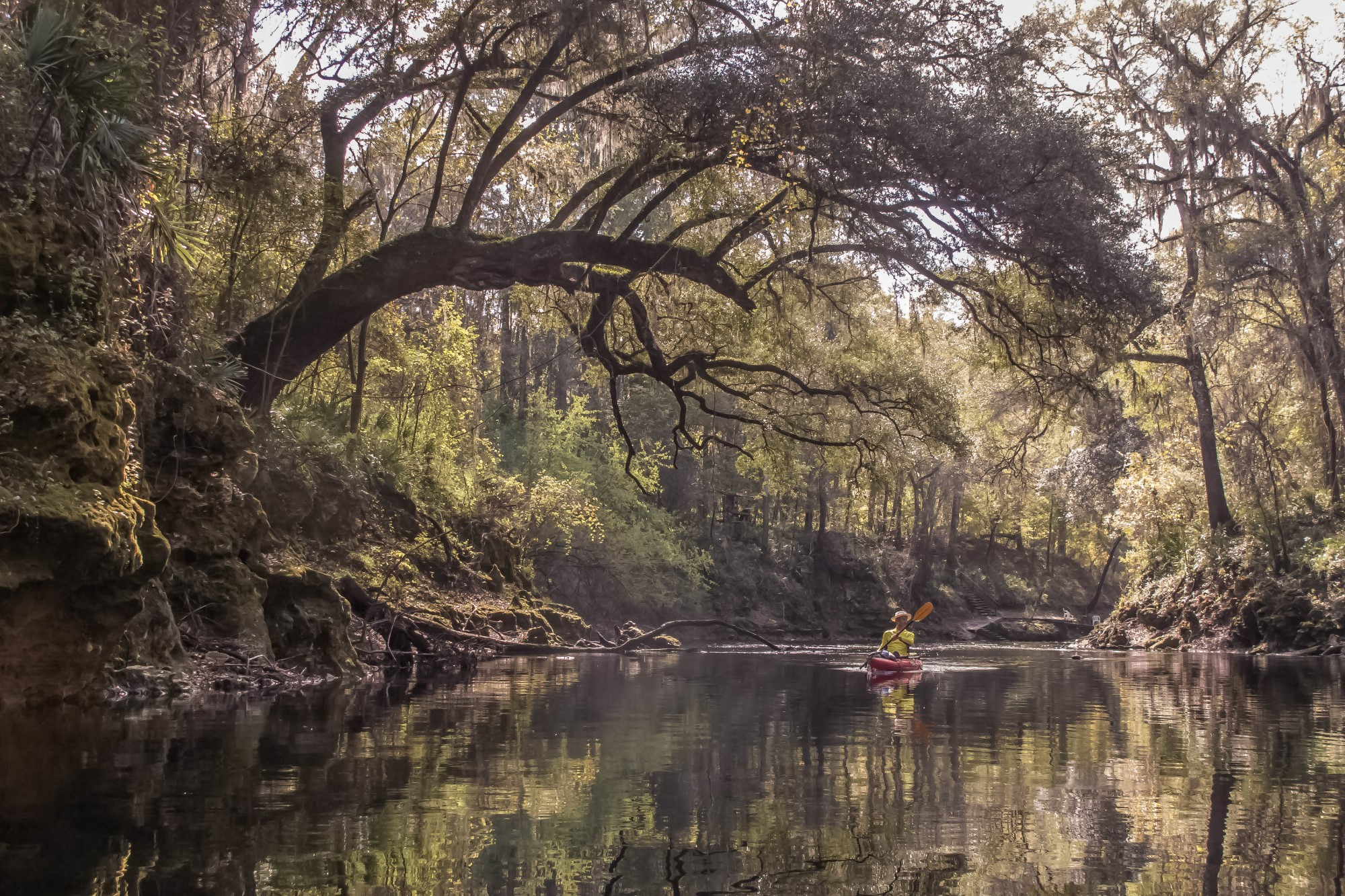
Kayaker paddling down Alapaha Rise, November 2015

Alapaha Rise, also known as Shelley Run, is the largest single spring in the United States. The Alapaha Rise is located in Hamilton County, Florida. It flows at an average rate of 802 cubic feet (22.7 m^{3}) per second. It drains into the Suwannee River about 1/3 mile upstream from where the Alapaha River meets the river. It is a First Magnitude spring, with high tannin levels.
