= Leon Sinks Geological Area =

Karstic area in Florida, US

Coordinates: 30.309273°N 84.34644°W

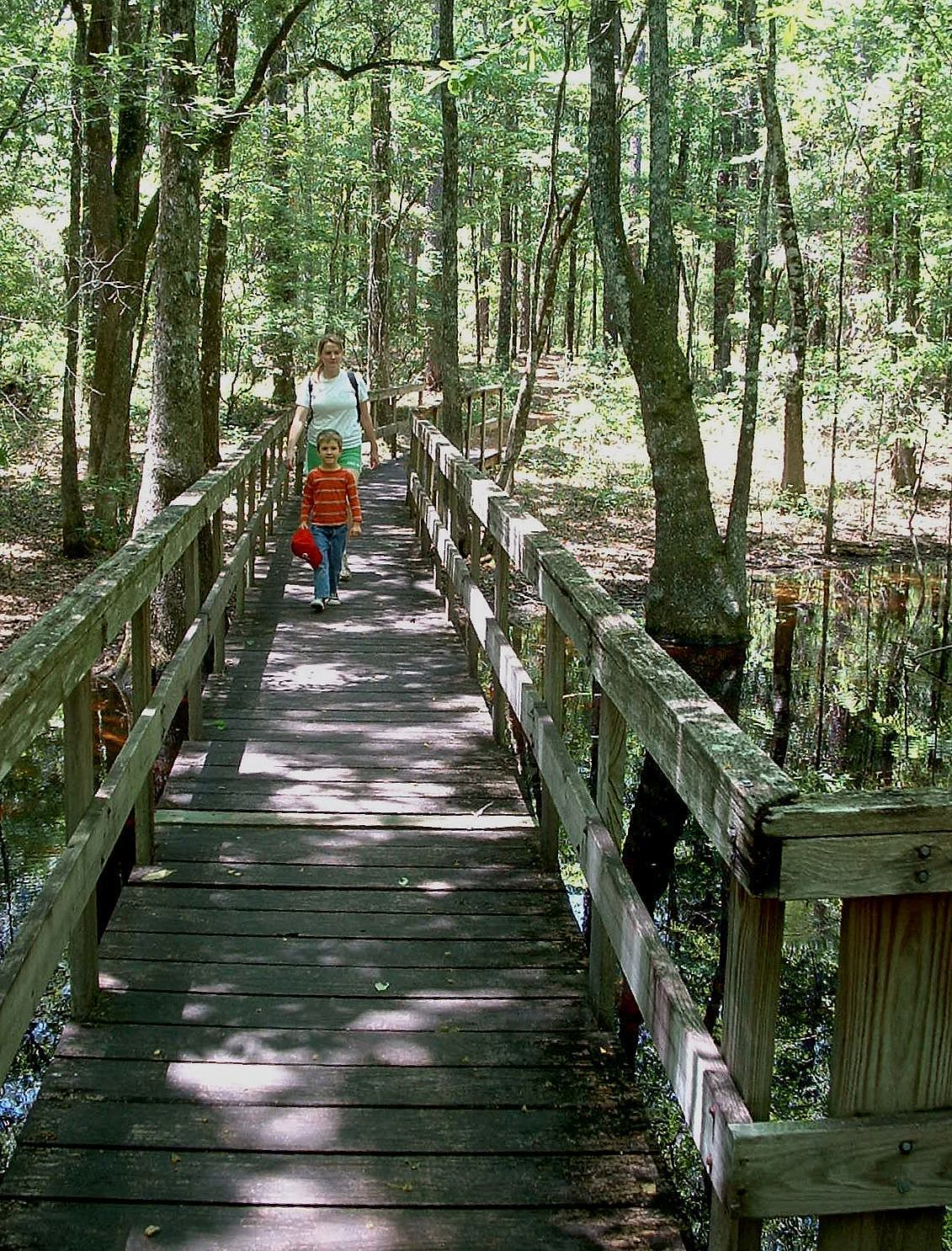
The Crossover Trail at Leon Sinks Geological Area in May 2005

The Leon Sinks Geological Area is located on the Woodville Karst Plain in southern and southwestern Leon County, Florida, United States. It is a mature karstic area on the Upper Floridan Aquifer. It is one of the most extensive underwater cave systems in the world and connects to Wakulla Springs.

This hydrological system is extremely vulnerable to pollution because of the very high permeability of the carbonate aquifer. Extensive mapping and exploration of these caves has been done by the Woodville Karst Plain Project to understand the complex dynamics of the area and to understand the proper ecological approach to keeping this system clean.

The Leon Sinks are full of life, including the freshwater eel and rare crustaceans, including the Woodville Karst Plain crayfish and the swimming Florida cave isopod Remasellus parvus, that only exist in the Woodville Karst Plain.

== Wakulla-Leon Sinks cave system ==
Wakulla cave consists of a dendritic network of conduits of which 12 miles (19 km) have been surveyed and mapped. The conduits are characterized as long tubes with diameter and depth being consistent (300 ft or 91 m depth); however, joining tubes can be divided by larger chambers of varying geometries. The largest conduit trends south from the spring/cave entrance for over 3.8 miles (6.1 km). Four secondary conduits, including Leon Sinks, intersect the main conduit. Most of these secondary conduits have been fully explored.

On Dec 15, 2007, the connection between the Wakulla cave system and Leon Sinks cave system was made by members of the Woodville Karst Plain Project to create the Wakulla-Leon Sinks Cave System. This connection established the system as the longest underwater cave in the United States and the sixth largest in the world at a total of 31.99 miles (51.48 km) of surveyed passages.

== Sinkholes ==
Many of the sinkholes in the Leon Sinks Geological Area are linked through underwater caves. The area includes both wet and dry sinkholes.

=== Wet sinkholes ===
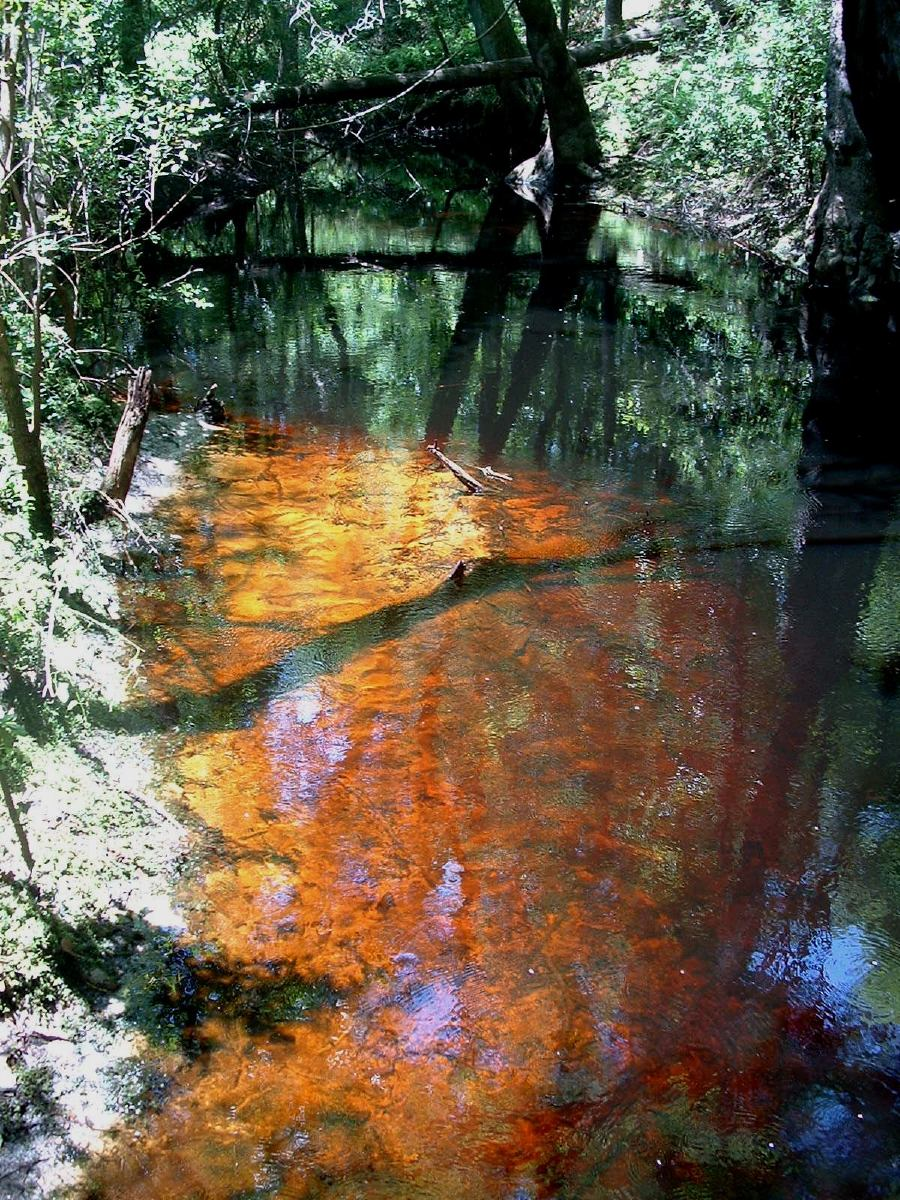
Leon Sinks black water

- Big Dismal – 100 foot drop to the water which drops another 100 feet underwater with a cave entrance at 80 feet down.
- Black
- Duckweed
- Fisher Creek
- Hammock (aka Little Dismal)
- Lost Stream
- Magnolia
- Natural Bridge

=== Dry sinkholes ===
- Back
- Big Eight
- Cone
- Far
- Field
- Gopher Hole
- Johnson
- Palmetto
- Tiny
- Turner

== Park and trails ==
The Leon Sinks offer three hiking trails to the different sinkholes in the park including an observation platform at Big Dismal Sink. The trails feature over 20 species of trees and 75 different plants along with wildlife ranging from Carolina chickadees to gopher tortoises.

Trails:

- Sinkhole Trail – 3.1 miles
- Gumswamp Trail – 2.3 miles
- Crossover Trail – 0.5 miles
