= Norwood culture =

Archaeological culture in Florida, US

The Norwood culture was a subculture or subperiod of the late Archaic culture.

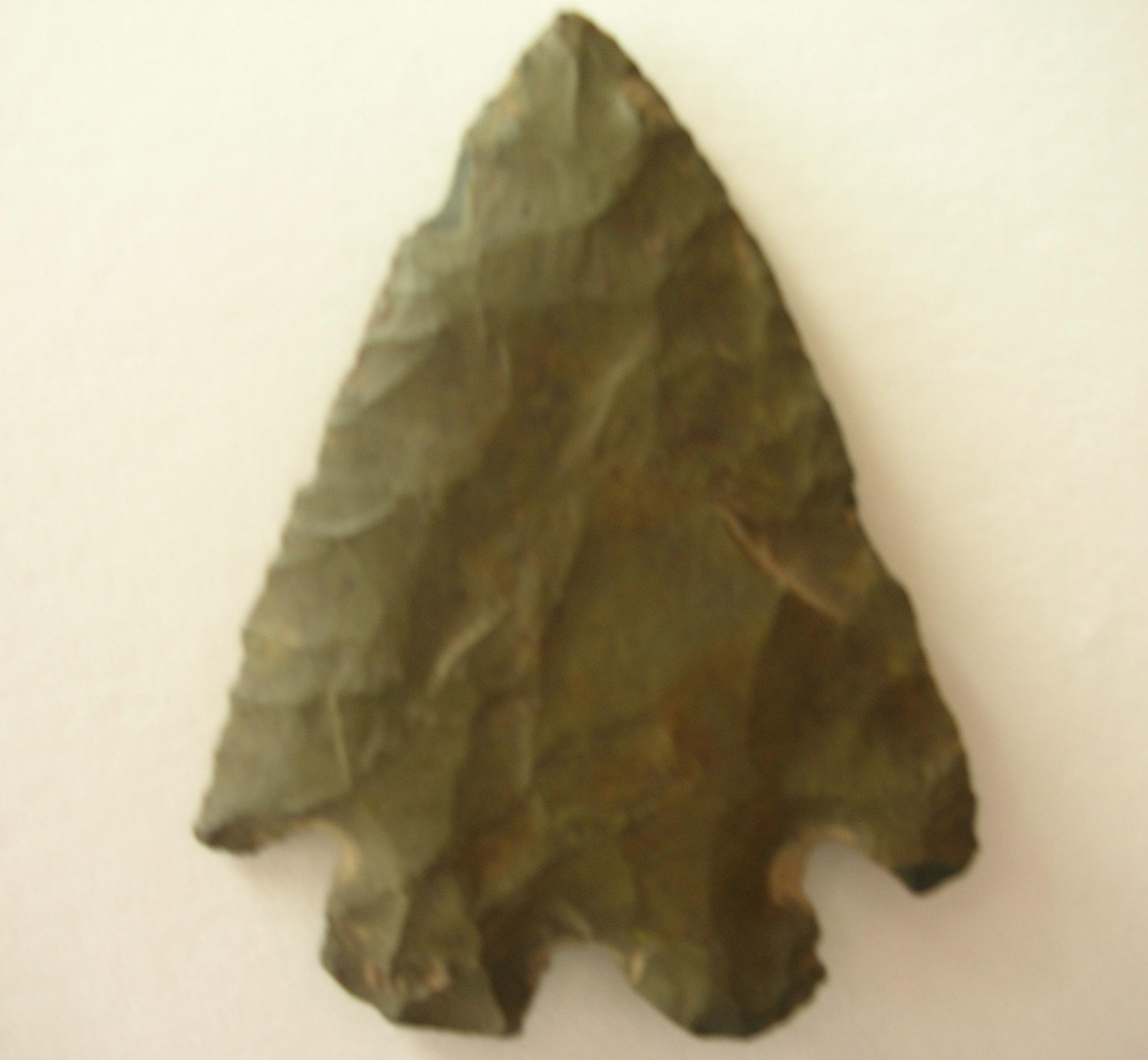
Projectile point for use on knives and other hunting implements

The Norwood culture was located in the Apalachee region, a forested and hilly part of what is now north Florida and was typical of other Archaic cultures using triangular-shaped projectile point knives which showed notches for attaching stone implements to shafts. It is widely accepted that Archaic cultures began using hand held spears to atlatls to more effectively bring down animals for clothing and consumption.

The Norwood culture was one of the first in North America to make pottery. The pottery was tempered with Spanish moss or strands of fiber from the palmetto, and decorated by making stick impressions on its outer surface prior to firing. Much of the Gulf coastal shell middens date to this Archaic period. Some sites have been covered by rising sea level, while other sites have been destroyed by modern borrowing activities and development.
