= Wakulla Springs =

Spring and cave in Florida, United States

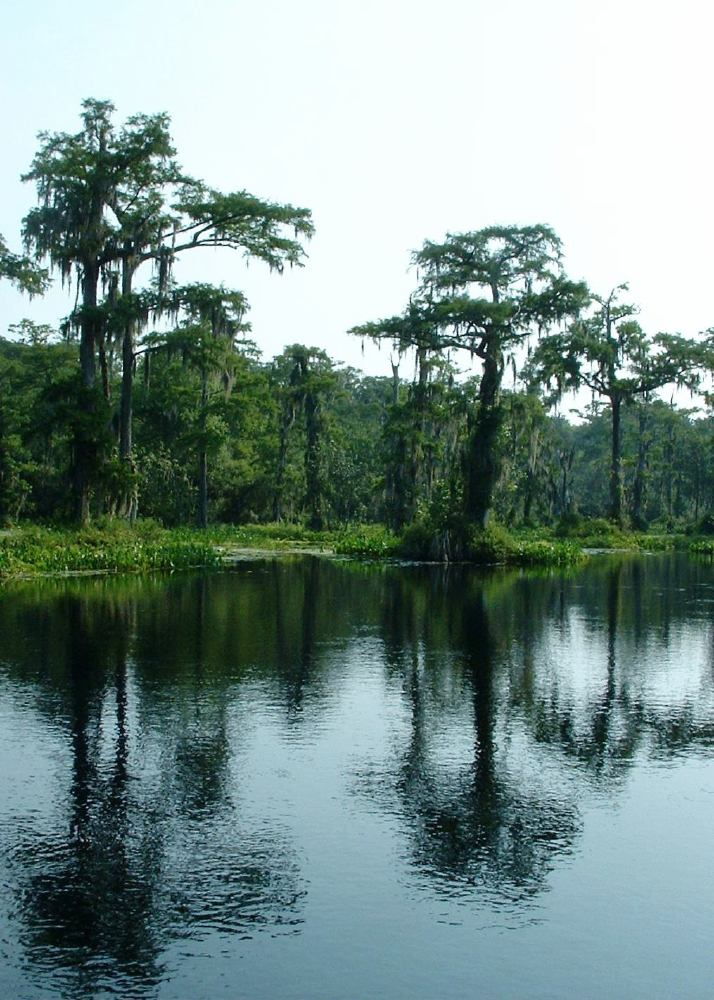
- Wakulla Springs as it empties into the Wakulla River

- Location within Florida
- Location: Florida, United States
- Coordinates: 30°14′01″N 84°18′19″W
- Depth: 350 ft (110 m)
- Length: 31.99 mi (51.48 km)
- Geology: Limestone
- Difficulty: Advanced cave diving
- Cave survey: Woodville Karst Plain Project

Wakulla Springs is a first magnitude spring and major exposure point for the Floridan Aquifer that forms the Wakulla River. Located 14 miles (23 km) south of Tallahassee, Florida and 5 miles (8.0 km) east of Crawfordville in Wakulla County, Florida at the crossroads of State Road 61 and State Road 267, it is protected in the Edward Ball Wakulla Springs State Park.

The Springs contain the fossilized remains of at least ten extinct mammals that date to the last glacial period, including mastodons.

== Description ==
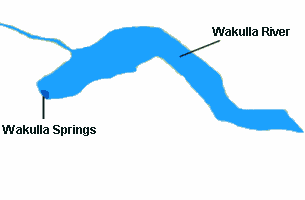
Wakulla Springs

Wakulla Springs is classified as a first magnitude spring and a major exposure point for the Floridan Aquifer. The spring forms the Wakulla River which flows 9 miles (14 km) to the southeast where it joins the St. Mark's River. After a short 5 miles (8.0 km) the St. Mark's empties into the Gulf of Mexico at Apalachee Bay.

Wakulla Cave is a branching flow-dominated cave that has developed in the Floridan Aquifer under the Woodville Karst Plain of north Florida.

== History and discovery ==
Scientific interest in the spring began in 1850, when Sarah Smith reported seeing the bones of an ancient mastodon on the bottom. Since that time, scientists have identified the remains of at least nine other extinct mammals that date to the last glacial period, deposited as far as 1,200 feet (360 m) back into a cave. Today, at a depth of about 190 feet (58 m), the fossilized remains of mastodons are in full view along with other fossils.

The Florida Geological Survey (FGS) commissioned their first study in August and September 1930 with geologist Herman Gunter. Gunter's work focused on the recovery of fossils found in the spring basin. He utilized hard hat diving techniques, a dredge, and "long-handled grappling tongs". A mastodon recovered from their work is now on display at the Museum of Florida History.

The FGS conducted additional studies at Wakulla Springs in 1955, 1956, and 1962 under the direction of vertebrate paleontologist, Stanley J. Olsen. Olsen's team of six divers from Florida State University discovered animal fossils deeper within the spring complex where they also found archaeological evidence of early humans, including bone and stone tools. Ultimately, the presumed behavioral association among the recovered cultural and fossil materials could not be demonstrated unequivocally because of the difficulty of establishing and maintaining provenience control in a submerged spring-vent context.

A major further exploration of Wakulla Springs was conducted in October–December 1987 by an expedition led by Dr. Bill Stone. The expedition team, which also included Sheck Exley and Wesley C. Skiles, penetrated the cave system to a distance of 4,160 feet (1,270 m) from the cave entrance. Skiles filmed the expedition for a National Geographic special. During the expedition Stone's Cis-Lunar Mk-1 rebreather was demonstrated in a 24-hour dive which used only half of the system's capacity. In 1998 and 1999, Stone directed an international group of explorers consisting of over 100 volunteers to participate in the Wakulla 2 Project.

== Prehistoric humans ==
Upper Paleolithic-Paleo-Indians lived at or near the spring over 13,000 years ago and were descendants of people who crossed into North America from eastern Asia during the Pleistocene. The Wakulla Lodge Site is one of several pre-Clovis sites in North Florida. During the first population period, Florida would have had a very dry and arid climate with a much lower shoreline. This made freshwater locations attractive to megafauna which likely led Paleo-Indians to the site.

== Prehistoric animal life ==
- American mastodon (Mammut americanum) found at Wakulla.
- Giant ground sloth (Eremotherium laurillardi)
- Saber-toothed tiger (Smilodon populator) found at Wakulla.
- Columbian mammoth (Mammutus columbi)
- Ancient bison (Bison antiquus)
- Equus (Equus scotti) found near Wakulla.
- Short-faced bear (Arctodus simus)
- Miocene dugong (Metaxytherium crataegense) found near Wakulla.
- American lion (Panthera leo atrox) found in Florida.

== Animal life today ==
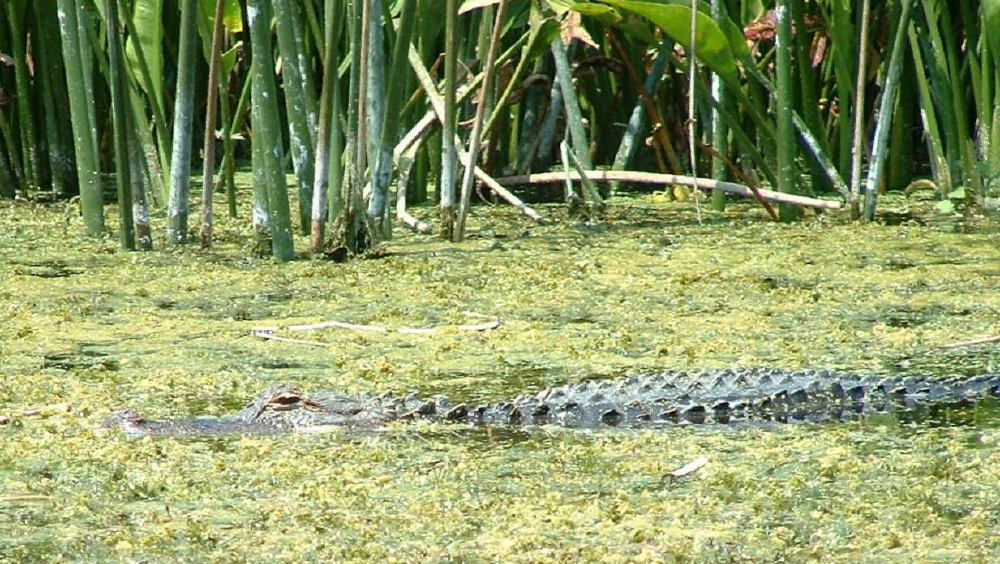
Alligator among shoreline vegetation at Wakulla Springs.

Found in and around Wakulla Springs are West Indian manatees, white-tailed deer, North American river otters, American alligators, Suwannee River cooters (Pseudemys suwanniensis), snapping turtles, softshell turtles, limpkin, purple gallinules, herons (including egrets), bald eagles, anhingas, ospreys, common moorhens, wood ducks, black vultures and turkey vultures.

== Hydrology ==
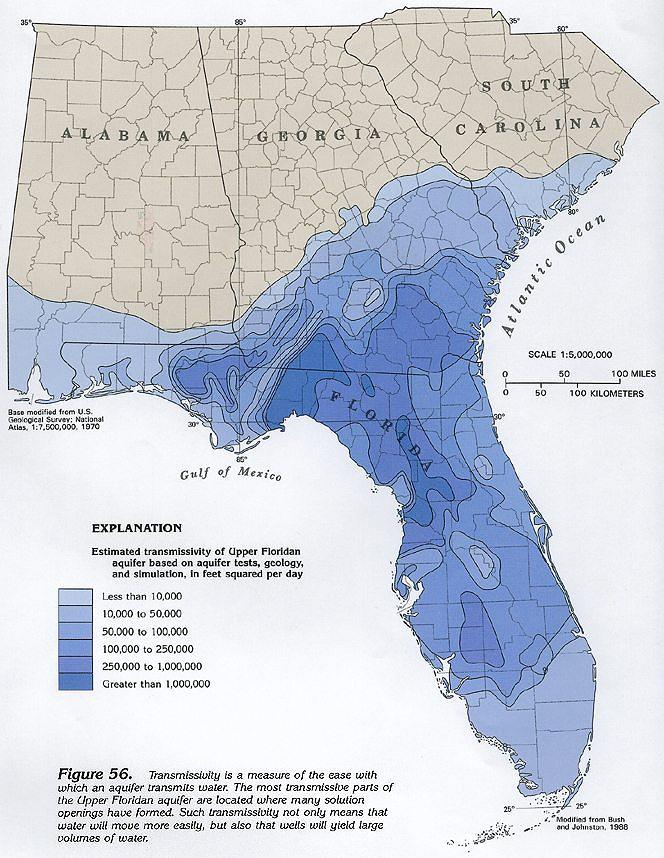
Map shows transmissivity values of Floridan Aquifer as it exits at Wakulla Springs.

=== Underwater cave system ===
Wakulla cave consists of a dendritic network of conduits of which 12 miles (19 km) have been surveyed and mapped. The conduits are characterized as long tubes with diameter and depth being consistent (300 ft or 91 m depth); however, joining tubes can be divided by larger chambers of varying geometries. The largest conduit trends south from the spring/cave entrance for over 3.8 miles (6.1 km). Four secondary conduits, including Leon Sinks, intersect the main conduit. Most of these secondary conduits have been fully explored.

On December 15, 2007, Woodville Karst Plain Project divers physically connected the Wakulla Springs and Leon Sinks cave systems establishing the Wakulla-Leon Sinks cave system. This connection established the system as the longest underwater cave in the United States and the sixth largest in the world with a total of 31.99 miles (51.48 km) of explored and surveyed passages.

=== Specifics on flow rate ===
Flow rate of the spring is 200–300 million US gallons (760,000–1,140,000 m^{3}) of water a day. A record peak flow from the spring on April 11, 1973 was measured at 14,324 US gallons (54,220 L) per second – equal to 1.2 billion US gallons (4,500,000 m^{3}) per day.

== In film ==
Beginning in 1938, several of the early Tarzan films including Tarzan's New York Adventure starring Johnny Weissmuller were filmed on location in Wakulla Springs. Other films such as Creature from the Black Lagoon, Revenge of the Creature, Night Moves, Airport '77 and Joe Panther starring Brian Keith and Ricardo Montalbán were also filmed on location at Wakulla Springs.

Most of the movie history can be traced back to Edward Ball, who purchased the land surrounding Wakulla in 1934. Initially, Wakulla was not a tourist destination, but rather a reclusive resort. This changed when Ball hired a new manager, Newt Perry, who brought publicity to Wakulla Springs. He previously worked at Silver Springs, where he worked with MGM during the production of Tarzan Finds a Son!.

Perry shot a series of underwater short films at Wakulla. One notorious films is What a Picnic!, in which a picnic scene was designed underwater and teenagers would dive down and re-enact a lunch sequence. These underwater films highlighted the aquatic environment that Wakulla Springs offered. Besides these short films, Perry is credited with luring the Metro-Goldwyn-Mayer Tarzan crews to Wakulla Springs, whose environment would act as a stand in for Africa.

Grantland Rice also shot scenes from a lesser known movie at Wakulla Springs, Amphibious Fighters (1943), in which an amphibious battle was staged.

== Recreation ==
=== Wakulla Springs Lodge ===
In 1931, Edward Ball, a businessman from Virginia, bought property in Tallahassee, Florida and construction on the Wakulla Springs Lodge started in 1935. Edward Ball hired the architectural firm Marsh and Saxelbye, known for their Mediterranean style mansions. Initially, the lodge was built as a guest house and in 1981, after his death, was turned into a hotel by the Edward Ball Wildlife Foundation.

The lodge is now a hotel with twenty-seven rooms. It is also currently a member of Historic Hotels of America, the official program of the National Trust for Historic Preservation.

In 2002, artisans started working to conserve the ceiling of the lodge, funded in part by the State of Florida, Division of Historical Resources and the Historic Preservation Board. Each picture on the 5,800 square-foot ceiling depicts historic Floridian scenes. The techniques are a combination of many, namely European folk art with Native American influences.

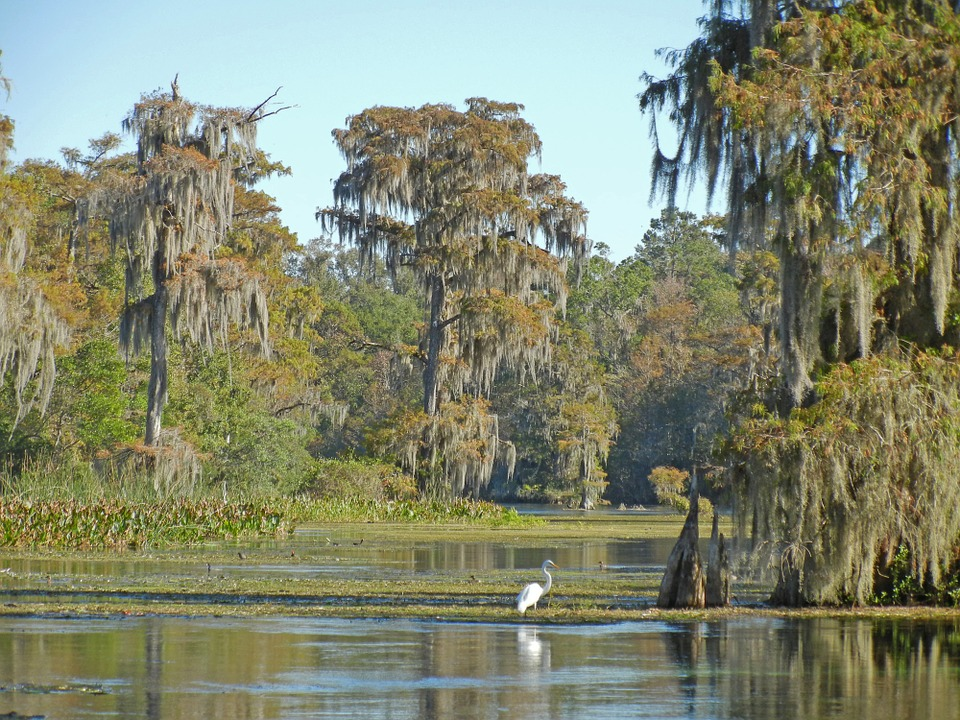
A heron in the water at Wakulla Springs State Park.

=== Hiking ===
Wakulla Springs has up to 9 miles of hiking trails.

=== Boat tours ===
Starting from 1875, glass-bottom boat tours have been an attraction at Wakulla Springs, though the glass bottom tours do not occur as often as in previous years due to lack of water clarity.

== Conservation ==
In late 1998, populations of the Florida applesnail underwent a dramatic decline; the iconic Limpkin bird followed suit and left by the fall of 1999. What was once a thriving and diverse ecosystem in north Florida is transitioning into a "biological desert", says Wakulla Springs conservationist Jim Stevenson. The Wakulla Springs basin stretches about 1,300 miles north of the spring in Florida and into some of south Georgia. The water pollution from storm water runoff, as well as nitrate-rich human water contamination through waste and pollution, seeps into the underground aquifer and trickles down and flows out of the Wakulla spring as water at the end of the pipe.

Measures have been taken to lessen the contamination of the spring. The City of Tallahassee has built Cascades Park, a storm water drainage point disguised as a municipal park for citizens. This helps reduce the amount of contaminated water entering the basin. The City of Tallahassee has also increased regulations on their wastewater. Factors that may reduce contamination include lowering pollution, using less harsh fertilizers and better waste solutions other than septic tanks that leak large amounts of nitrates into the soil, and thus the spring.

== See also ==
- Edward Ball Wakulla Springs State Park
- Geography of Florida
