= Remasellus =

Conservation status
- Critically Imperiled (NatureServe)

Scientific classification
- Kingdom: Animalia
- Phylum: Arthropoda
- Class: Malacostraca
- Order: Isopoda
- Family: Asellidae
- Genus: Remasellus; Bowman & Sket, 1985
- Species: R. parvus

Binomial name
- Remasellus parvus (Steeves, 1964)

Synonyms
- Conasellus parvus (Steeves, 1964)

Genus of crustaceans

Remasellus parvus, the swimming Florida cave isopod, is an isopod endemic to 4 caves in the Ochlockonee and Aucilla-Suwanee drainages of Florida, United States. It is the only species in the genus Remasellus.
