= Marjory Stoneman Douglas House =

Historic house in Florida, United States

- U.S. National Register of Historic Places
- U.S. National Historic Landmark
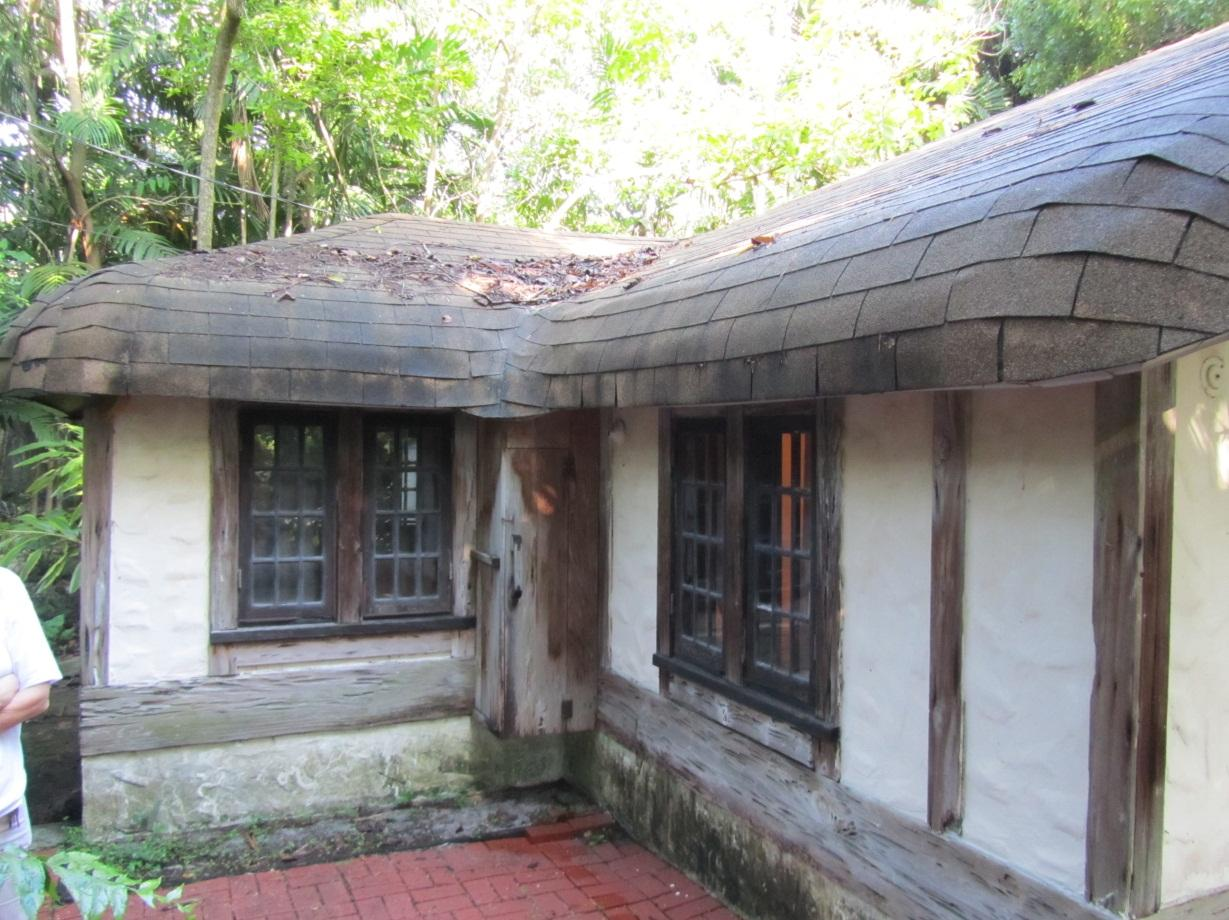

- Location within Miami Location within Florida Location within the United States
- Location: 3744 Stewart Ave., Miami, Florida
- Coordinates: 25°42′40″N 80°15′13″W
- Built: 1926
- NRHP reference No.: 15000312

Significant dates
- Added to NRHP: February 27, 2015
- Designated NHL: February 27, 2015

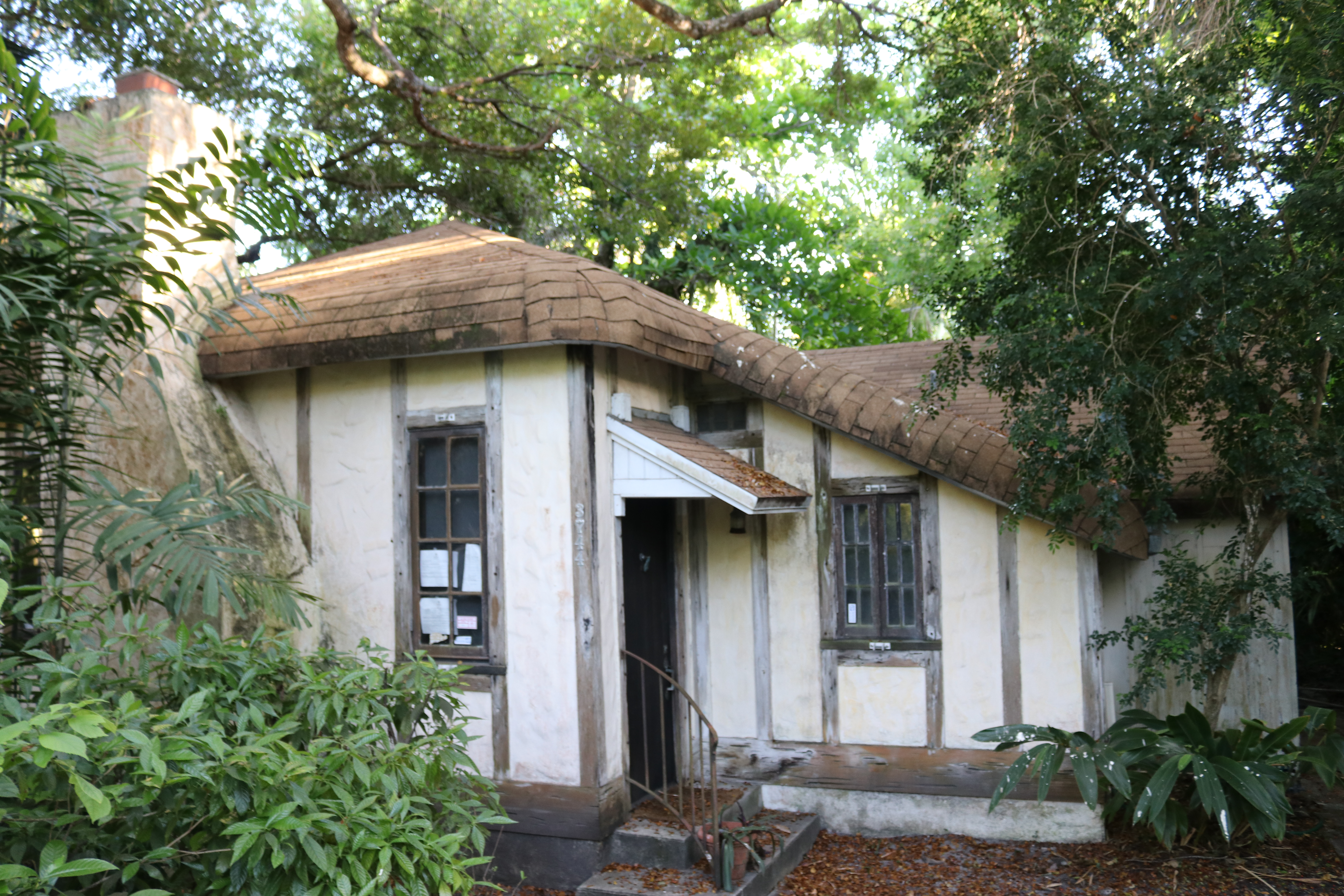
Marjory Stoneman Douglas's house as of March 2023

The Marjory Stoneman Douglas House is a historic house at 3744 Stewart Avenue in Miami, Florida. Built in 1926, it was the lifelong home of environmentalist Marjory Stoneman Douglas (1890-1998), who was nationally known for her efforts to preserve the Everglades of southern Florida. The house was designated a National Historic Landmark in 2015.

== Description and history ==
The Douglas House is located in Miami's Coconut Grove neighborhood, on the south side of Stewart Avenue, a short way west of Southwest 37th Street. It is a single story wood-frame structure, its exterior finished in a variety of surfaces, including half-timbered stucco, brick, and wooden timbering. It has a T-shaped plan, and stylistically resembles an English country cottage, with a curving roof made of steam-shaped wooden shingles. Exterior wood is typically cypress, and windows are irregularly placed. The house is set in a densely-planted yard, designed to afford some shade to the structure, and frequently obscuring its shape. The interior is finished in hardwood flooring, with plaster walls, and plaster ceilings with exposed beams.

The house was built in 1926 to a design by architect George Hyde, creating what Douglas described as "a workshop, more than a house". It was here that she did much of her intellectual work and writing, including important works such as The Everglades: River of Grass, a seminal 1947 work describing the declining quality of the Everglades, even as some preservation actions were taking place, including the formation of Everglades National Park, a move that she championed. Douglas's home was a frequent meeting point for area conservationists. It was purchased by the state in 1991, as the home of "one of Florida's most distinguished citizens."

== See also ==
- List of National Historic Landmarks in Florida
- National Register of Historic Places listings in Miami, Florida
