= Kissingen Springs =

Historic spring in Florida, United States

Kissingen Spring
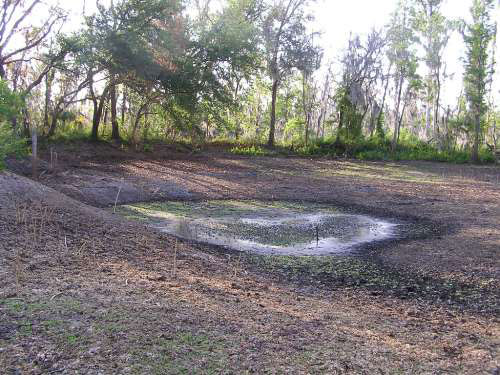
- The Remains Of Kissingen Spring (2006)
- Interactive map of Kissingen Spring
- Location: Bartow, Florida
- Coordinates: 27.8425°N 81.8110°W
- Spring source: Floridian Aquifer
- Magnitude: second magnitude spring
- Flow: 20 million gallons

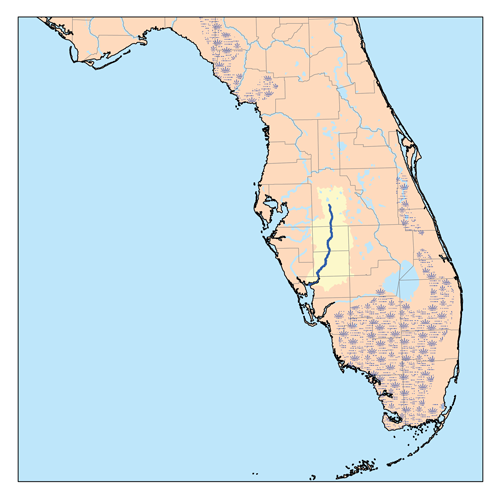

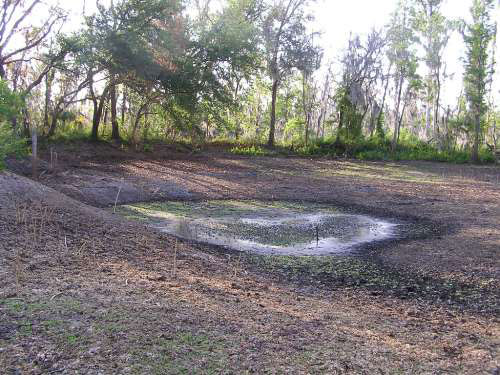
Condition of spring in 2006

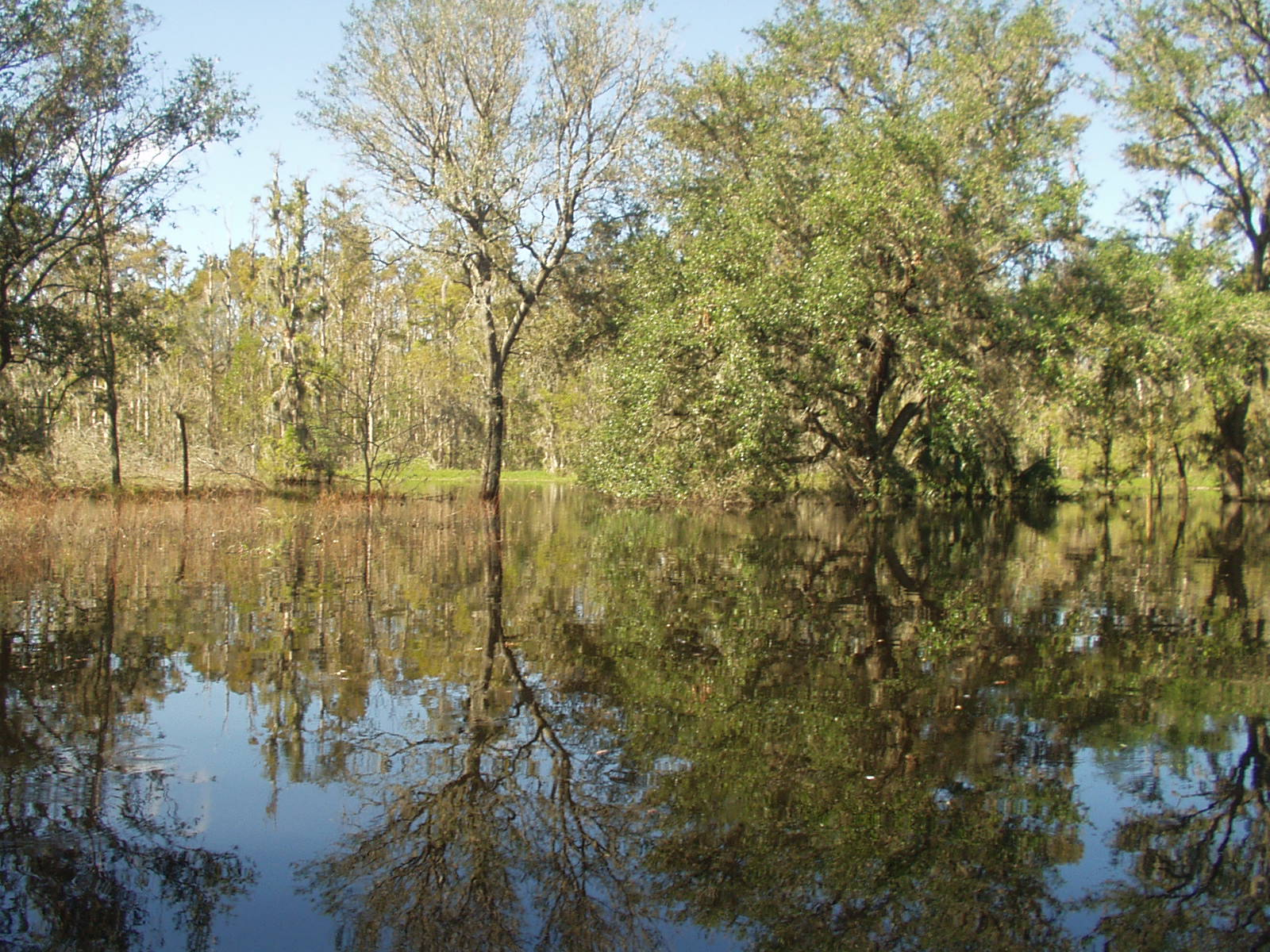
Backflow from Peace River after hurricanes

Kissingen Spring (also spelled Kissengen) was a natural spring formerly flowing in Polk County, Southwest Florida. It was also a venue for recreation until it dried up in 1950. Hundreds of wells drilled into the Floridan Aquifer may have caused the demise of the springs. Its site is located near the northern end of Peace River, approximately 3/4 mile east of U.S. Highway 17 and 4 miles south of Florida SR 60 / south of Bartow.

== History ==
Kissengen's springwater rose from the Floridan Aquifer at the rate of 20 million gallons a day. Kissengen Spring was once a second magnitude spring.

In 1886, the Burr family moved near the spring to farm.

Increased groundwater withdrawal, beginning in the late 1930s, lowered the potentiometric surface of the aquifers. Kissengen Spring gradually ceased flowing. The spring was publicly declared inactive in 1950 as the result of overpumpage.

Until 1950, tourists used the area for picnicking, boating, and swimming. There was a pavilion for parties and dancing. The waters were thought medically beneficial to those with various ailments.

In 1962 a sinkhole filled in the spring vent with clay.

=== Historical Marker ===
A historical marker was funded by the Florida Humanities Council. The Polk County Museum had a Historical Marker Ceremony in August 2011. The marker has now been placed at the Mosaic Peace River Park.

== Hydrology ==
In 1962 a sinkhole formed near the site of Kissengen Spring and a flow of clay filled in the flow vent and probably the underground channels. This is a problem in restoring flow to the springs.

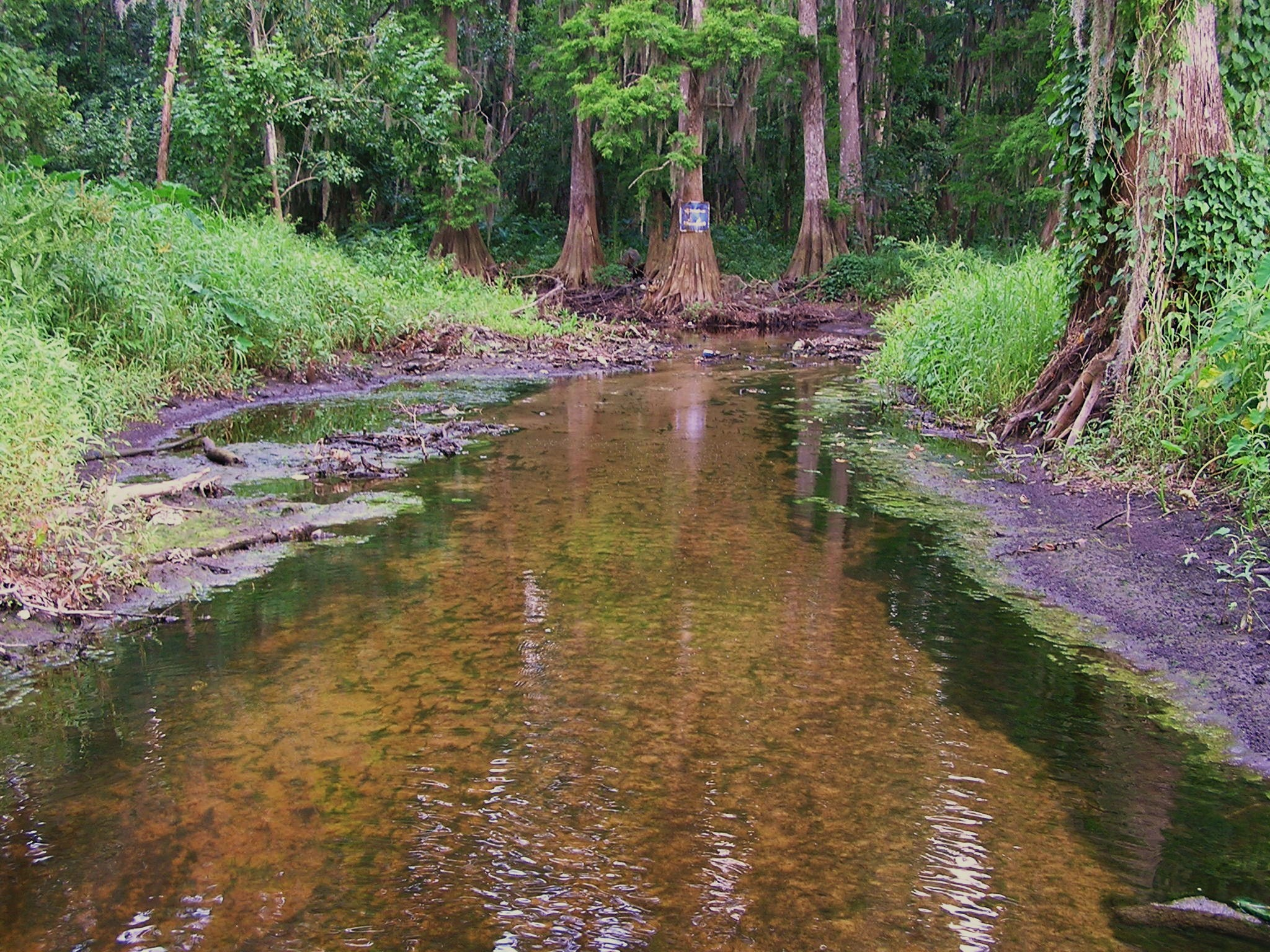
Flow changes along upper Peace River

=== Florida aquifers ===
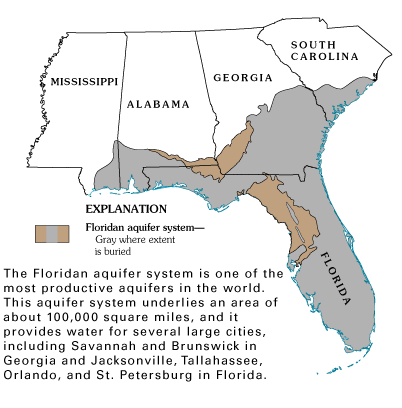
The Floridan aquifer underlies portions of five states. Source: USGS

Most spring water comes from the Floridan aquifer. This water enters the aquifer from local groundwater recharge areas that include the Lake Wales Ridge and other relict islands to the east and north. The water is under pressure and this force pushes water out of spring vents.

=== Peace River ===
Kissingen Spring used to discharge 20 million US gallons (76,000 m^{3}) of water into Peace River. The river had a year-round flow. Decreases in the spring's water pressure caused large sinks to reverse the flow and these sinks would receive water from the riverbed. Water flows into openings to the underground karst conduits.

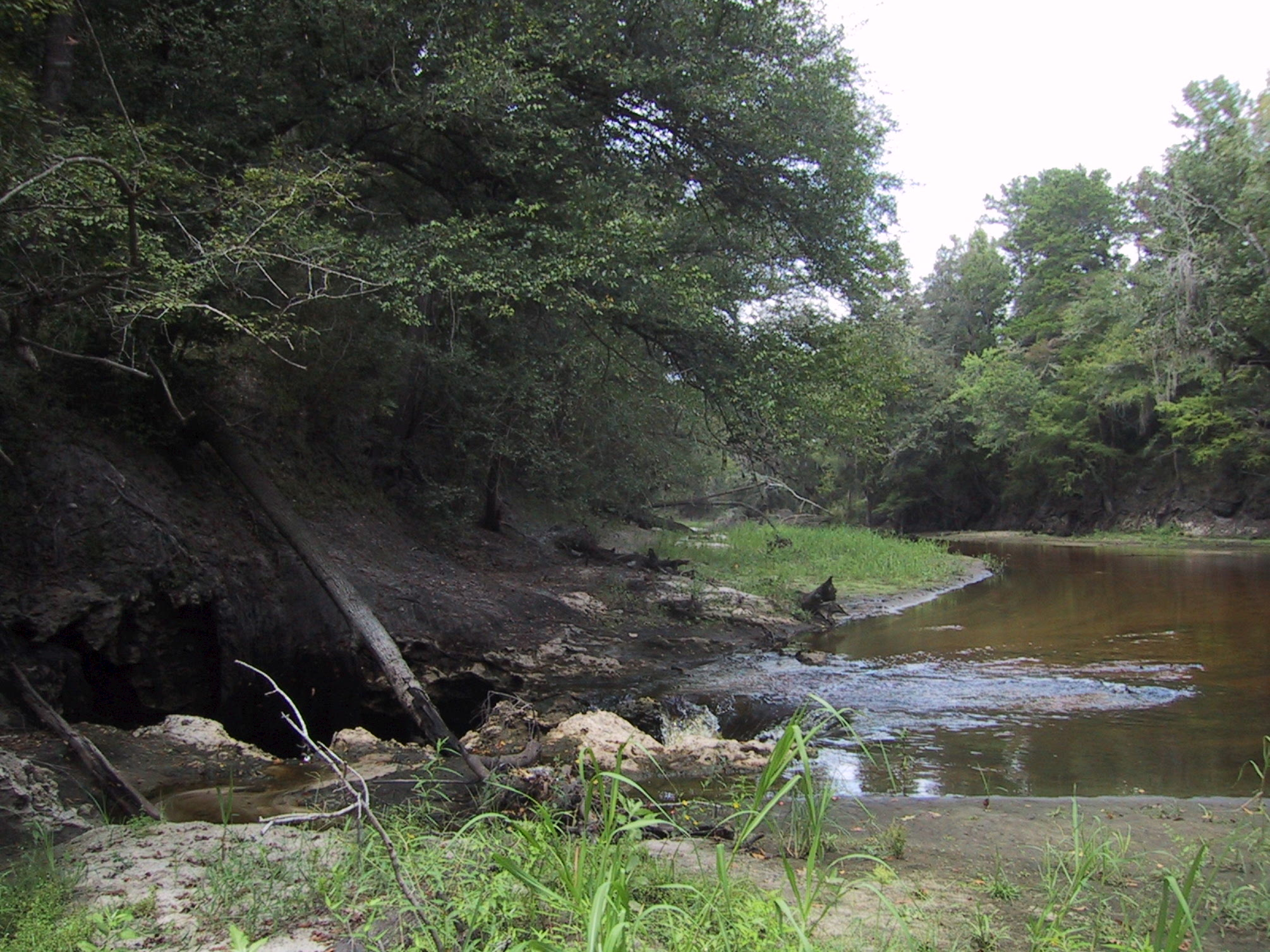
Image of the entire surface water flow of the Alapaha River near Jennings, Florida going into a sinkhole leading to the Floridan Aquifer groundwater.

Progress is being made to control the draining of the aquifer.

There are a number of cracks and sinks in the Peace River. The water flows down into undergroundcaverns that can hold millions of gallons of water.

A hydrology report on Peace River points to efforts to repair damage caused by the lowering of the Floridan Aquifer water level.

=== Peace Creek ===
Located in Polk County, Peace Creek joins with Saddle Creek to form the headwaters of the Peace River. This stream and its watershed have been altered from their natural state.

== Role of government ==
Water regulation did not start until the early 1960s.

The Florida Department of Environmental Protection (DEP) protects natural resources, including springs.

The Southwest Florida Water Management District has developed a plan to restore waterflow to Kissingen Springs.

== Restoration ==
It is not known whether the water shortage at Kissengen Spring is real and permanent, or the result of a period of lower than average rainfall coupled with decades of pre-regulatory overdrafting of the aquifer.

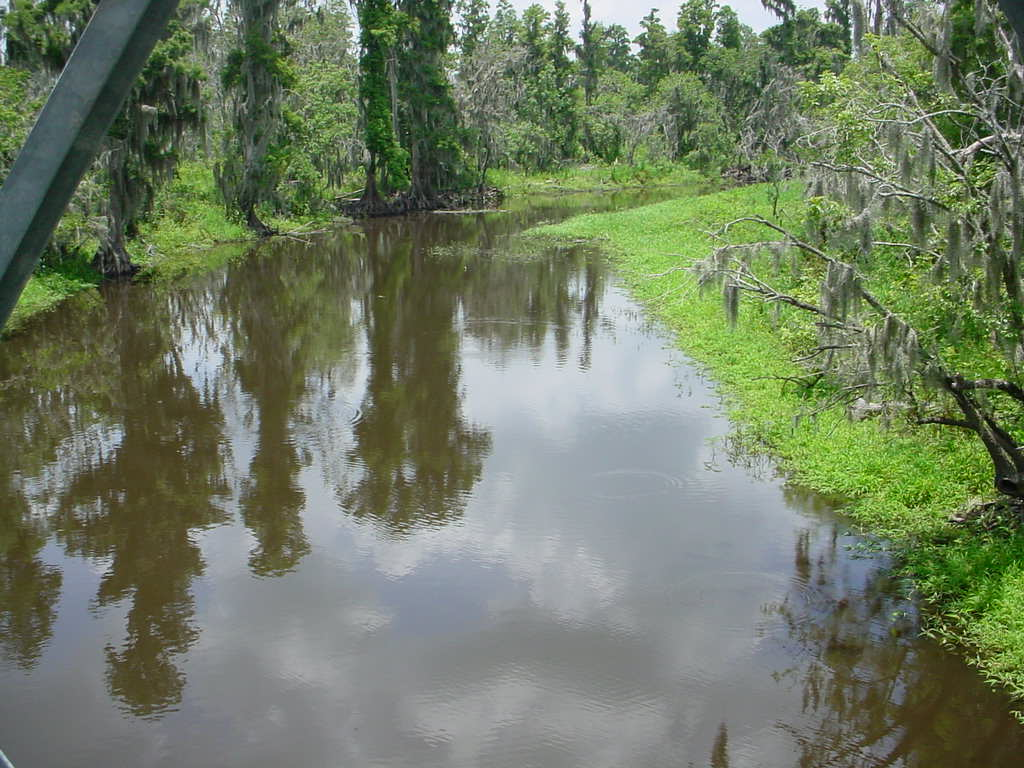
Streamflow changes along upper Peace River

There is a project to raise the level of Lake Hancock and start a larger flow towards Peace River.

To restore Kissengen Spring, the aquifer must be recharged with enough water to recreate the original spring pressure. Peace River will have to be restored to the year round minimal flow. During May, much of the upper Peace River goes dry. This dry period is hindering the aquifer recharge and revitalization of Kissengen Spring.

The intent of these two projects is to increase the clean flow of Peace River and recharge the aquifer around the Kissengen Spring area.

=== Lake Hancock Outfall Wetland Project ===
The Lake Hancock Outfall Wetland Project (LHOWP) is a large-scale, flow-through, wetland to improve the quality of water that discharges from Lake Hancock to Saddle Creek and ultimately to the Peace River and Charlotte Harbor. The project site is located adjacent to and south of Lake Hancock in Bartow, Polk County, Florida.

The finished project is expected to consist of a 1,008 acres (408 ha) treatment wetland located on former reclaimed phosphate mine clay settling areas now owned by the Southwest Florida Water Management District.

On the south end of Lake Hancock is a structure called P-11. It can be raised or lowered to control the level of water in Lake Hancock.

Water will be pumped from the southern shore of the lake through three wetland cells. The cells will incorporate narrow planting strips separated by larger natural recruitment zones. The treated water will discharge from the Cell 3 wetland outfall structure into Lower Saddle Creek, which is downstream of the lake outfall structure (P-11).

The project includes construction of an inlet pump station, instrumentation, controls, control structures, earthwork, embankment, slurry cut-off wall, channels, aeration structure and access road.

The plan is to raise the level of the lake about 1 foot (0.30 m) and making the lake a natural storage area for water. The result would increase flow into the Peace River. Part of the project is to filter the water through marsh areas before releasing it.

Peace River has several openings into the karst conduits and millions of gallons of water flow underground instead of down the riverbed. This project will attempt to create berms around these holes and limit the amount of water being lost.

The water cannot be directly discharged into Peace River because of the polluted condition of the water.

The LHOWP project should be completed by 2013.

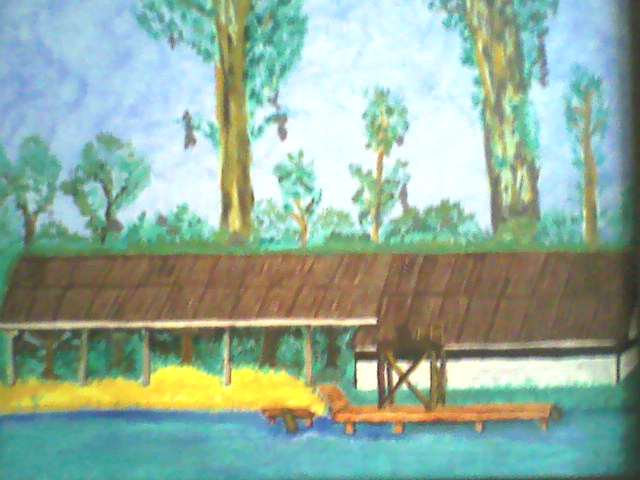
Painting Kissengen Springs

=== Peace River Project ===
A second project is being built on the Old Plantation property to clean the water and send it to Peace River.
