= Helen Muir (reporter) =

American reporter and author (1911-2006)

- Born: 9 February 1911; Yonkers, New York, U.S.
- Died: 14 February 2006 (aged 95); Miami, Florida, U.S.
- Occupations: Journalist, Writer
- Spouse: William "Bill" Whalley Muir (1900-1980)

Helen Muir (9 February 1911 – 14 February 2006) was an American reporter and author. Her full name was Helen Teresa Eucharia Flaherty Lennehan Muir. Her career included writing and editing for newspapers and magazines, primarily in Miami, and she published four books focused on Miami's history. She was also known for her advocacy of libraries. She was inducted into the Florida Women's Hall of Fame in 1984.

== Family history ==
Muir was born February 9, 1911, at 110 Downing Street, in Yonkers, New York. She was named after her mother, Helen Teresa Flaherty. Her maternal great-grandfather, Geoffrey O'Flaherty of Waterford, and great-grandmother Katherine Fitzgerald of County Clare, had left Ireland during the Great Famine. The family stopped using the "O" and was later known as "Flaherty." Her father, Emmet Aloysius Lennehan, was the child of Margaret "Maggie" McGann and Timothy Lennehan, who taught philosophy in Dublin, before coming to the United States. Her paternal great-grandfather, Phillip McGann, fought for the Union in the Irish Brigade in the Battle of Gettysburg and was shot down defending a stone wall and waving an American flag.

Emmet began playing piano in a saloon at 14 years old, with shots of whiskey as payment. He walked with a limp, because he was injured as a child sliding down a banister of his family's home, and used a cane. He and Muir's mother, known as "Nellie" met very young, and eloped when they were eighteen and nineteen years old in Lake Champlain. When they returned, they were married again in a Catholic ceremony at St. Peter's Church, at their families' insistence. Emmet studied accounting by mail with Pace Correspondence School. He took a job as a bookkeeper with Spreckel's Sugar Company, and worked his way up, eventually becoming the head of the fixed capital department at United Electric Company, which became Consolidated Edison. Muir had two sisters, the older Katherine, "Kay," and a younger sister Marjorie.

She credited her grandfather, John Henry Augustine Flaherty with teaching her how to read at a very young age. He was also a writer for the New York World. Katherine's husband, Robert Roth, was a writer as well, and served as managing editor of the Mt. Vernon paper, before becoming the Washington correspondent for the Philadelphia Bulletin.

== Career ==
Muir finished high school in the "fatal summer of 1929." She had earned a scholarship to Simmons College to study drama, and had been voted "most entertaining girl" in her graduating class at Yonkers High School. She took a summer job at the Yonkers Herald, "earning $65 dollars a month." At the end of the summer, she told her mother that she was not sure about college. She continued working as a journalist, and never obtained a college degree.

The Yonkers Herald became the Herald Statesman, and Muir became Society Editor. She moved from the Herald Statesman to the New York Post, and then to the New York Journal. She was writing a column about Westchester County, when Carl Byoir asked her to help with the Westchester Biltmore Country Club Fashion Show and Ball at the Waldorf Astoria. Muir was able to convince the New York World-Telegram to publish a full-page of photographs, which caught the attention of Eleanor Roosevelt, a member of the committee hosting the event. At the Biltmore Ball, Carl Byoir offered Muir a job publicizing the Roney Plaza Hotel in Miami Beach.

In December 1934, Muir left New York City on the Havana Special. She was 23 years old. Her friends at the New York Journal threw her such a farewell party, she nearly missed the 10 PM departure. It took two days to reach Miami by train, and when she arrived, she was whisked off to the Biltmore Hotel for breakfast with Carl Byoir's people. She was told that she would be interviewing Eddie Rickenbacker the same evening at the Roney Plaza Hotel. Overnight, she was interviewing people such as Doris Duke, Yvonne Printemps, Pierre Fresnay, Nathaniel Gubbins, Clare Boothe Luce, Errol Flynn, and other notable public figures. She intended to stay one season, but an offer from the city editor of The Miami News, Frank Malone, to run the rewrite desk gave her pause.

She wrote about Florida as a columnist for the Universal Service syndicate from 1935 to 1938 and wrote freelance for The Miami News and the Miami Herald until 1965. In 1941, she had a daily column, "Very Truly Yours" in The Miami News. She left the post after the attack on Pearl Harbor, to become publicist for the "Committee to Defend America," and had a radio program called Women in Defense on WQAM during World War II. By 1943, she was serving as society and women's editor for The Miami News. During her career, she interviewed and wrote about the Duke and Duchess of Windsor, Jessica Mitford, John Barrymore, Alfred Hitchcock, Joan Crawford, Christina Crawford, Liza Minnelli, Ernest Hemingway, Tennessee Williams, Alan Alda, Lord and Lady Clement Attlee, Larry King, and was one of the first American journalists to interview the Beatles during their visit to Miami Beach to perform for the Ed Sullivan Show at the Deauville Hotel. Aside from interviewing famous visitors to Miami, Muir wrote articles that were published nationally. For example, on April 25, 1951, an article she wrote regarding the Parrot Jungle, "Glorious Things That Fly," appeared in The Saturday Evening Post.

During her career, she served as a drama critic and editor for The Miami News. Significant productions were performed at the Coconut Grove Playhouse, including Auntie Mame, starring Gypsy Rose Lee, Show Boat, with Julie Wilson, and Waiting for Godot, with Bert Lahr. She received praise for reviewing diverse theatrical productions, including at the Lyric Theater. At a commemorative event, Muir was proud to be recognized by a speaker, who said "When you were black and wanted anything reviewed, Mrs. Muir was the only one." She travelled widely, writing about theatrical productions in Ireland, England, France and Portugal, until 1965 when she felt that theater had become "unpleasant."

Her closest friends included author Philip Wylie, and Marjory Stoneman Douglas. Novelist Hervey Allen, distinguished poet, teacher, and author of the bestselling novel Anthony Adverse, called Marjory Stoneman Douglas and Muir, "the Stewart Avenue Gang" because they were neighbors and friends for many years. The two were fond of having sherry together and gossiping, but those moments were followed by serious talk of the future of libraries, and the role of women in South Florida. They were confidants, and often shared their work with one another. Muir was also very close friends with Robert Wright and George Forrest. Helen had a lifelong friendship with Robert Frost, which began in 1941 when she interviewed him at the suggestion of Hervey Allen. She wrote a piece about their conversation, and he wrote in response, "You are the first interviewer I've ever met who could be amusing but not at my expense." Beginning in 1951, she and her family visited him at his farm in Ripton, Vermont during the summer months. In 1962, Frost became ill while visiting Pencil Pines, and asked Muir to guard his satchel of poems while he was being treated at Baptist Hospital. William Muir, Helen's husband and a prominent local lawyer, executed Frost's South Florida Estate upon his death in 1963, a testament to how close the Muirs and Frosts relationship had become over the years.

Muir authored several books. In 1953, she wrote the first edition of Miami, U.S.A. When it first appeared, Marjory Stoneman Douglas said in the Chicago Tribune, "Only old American cities have been thought to be worthy subjects of books. This book therefore may mark the coming of age of one of the youngest, in the last uncitied corner of the United States... The story, with the inspired title, is vigorous, colorful, dramatic, variously detailed, jam-packed with people, fast moving, a seething document." She brought the work current twice, with the second edition, published in 1990, and the third, expanded edition, published in 2000 by the University Press of Florida, at the age of 89. In 1987, she authored the first edition of Biltmore: Beacon for Miami, a history of the historic Coral Gables hotel built by George Merrick. She updated and published a second edition in 1993 and a third in 1997. In 1995, she published a memoir of her twenty-two year friendship with Robert Frost, entitled Frost in Florida: A Memoir.

Her papers are collected at the University of Miami.

== Library service ==
When Muir first came to Miami, she was astonished by the inadequacy of the public libraries. The main library was upstairs in an office building and was segregated. The Coconut Grove Library was a subscription library, that had been founded by the Kirk Munroe family with assistance from Mrs. Andrew Carnegie. Muir was inspired to build the children's book collection of the Coconut Grove Library as a memorial to her youngest daughter, Melissa, who was tragically killed by a delivery truck while playing in a friend's front yard just before her fifth birthday. At the time, Marjory Stoneman Douglas was serving as the book editor for the Miami Herald, and convinced Muir to serve as the children's book editor. Muir donated the books that she reviewed to the Coconut Grove Library for the Melissa Muir collection. She joined the Coconut Grove Library board of directors, that met in her home annually to discuss the collection and the condition of the building.

Muir was appointed to the board of trustees for the City of Miami's Public Library in 1962, at the recommendation of county commissioner Alice Wainwright. (The first woman county commissioner for Miami-Dade County.) To advocate for a county library system, Muir published an article in The Miami News entitled "Why it's Time for a County Library System," which sparked a thoughtful public debate that ultimately led to the consolidation of the City and County library systems and established the county library system. Muir was elected as the first Chairperson of the Library Advisory Board and appointed to the Dade County Library Committee of the Florida Library Development Council. She also served on the board of the University of Miami Library, which is why she decided to give them her papers and correspondence when she died. She ultimately chaired the State Library Advisory Council and helped lead the organization of the Miami-Dade Public Library System. She co-founded the Friends of the Miami-Dade Public Libraries with friend Marjory Stoneman Douglas and others, and the Miami International Book Fair. She was named to the American Library Trustee Association Advocates Honor Roll in 2000.

== Family ==
Helen was married to William "Bill" Whalley Muir in January 1936 in a civil ceremony at Miami City Hall. He was from Portland, Oregon, and his father had been a State Attorney and his maternal grandfather had been a judge. He attended Stanford University, and Columbia Law School. He was recruited away from law school to serve as attorney for the Miami Beach Development Company by Carl G. Fischer, and did not finish his law degree. They had three children, Mary, Melissa, and William.

She died on February 14, 2006.

== Bibliography ==
- Miami, USA
- Biltmore, Beacon for Miami
- Frost in Florida (1995), a memoir of her friendship with Robert Frost from 1935 - 1963
- Baby Grace Sees the Cow: A Memoir (2004)
