= Garald G. Parker =

United States geologist and hydrologist

Garald G. Parker Sr. (1905–2000) was a hydrologist and is known as the "Father of Florida groundwater hydrology." Parker also named the principal artesian aquifer the Floridan Aquifer.

== Education ==
Bachelor's degree with studies in Geology and Biology from Central Washington State College. Graduate School at the University of Washington.

== Career ==
=== School teacher ===
Parker taught in the public schools for 10 years prior to graduating from college.

=== U.S. Geological Survey ===
- In 1940, Parker began his career as a hydrogeologist when he made a cross-country trip to help save the water supply of Miami, Florida from saltwater intrusion. Parker developed protective measures to save well fields and also from 1940 to 1947 identified and named the Biscayne Aquifer, the Floridan Aquifer and defined the geologic structure of southern Florida. Parker was also a mentor to Marjory Stoneman Douglas on the water of the Everglades for her 1947 book, The Everglades: River of Grass. Parker also discovered the Peninsular Florida Hydrologic Divide which results in the southern portion of Florida being entirely dependent on rainfall for its freshwater.
- From 1948 to 1949, Parker was assigned to the Hanford Atomic Energy Resource/Reservation in Richmond, Washington.
- From 1949 to 1955, he was located in the Washington headquarters in both the Ground Water Branch and later in the general hydrology branch.
- From 1956 to 1959, he led the multi-agency Delaware River Basin study.
- From 1960 to 1965 Parker was assigned to Denver, Colorado where he was in charge of the arid lands research effort.
- From 1966 to 1969 he was the District Chief for the state of New York.

=== SW Florida Water Management District ===
In 1969 he served as the first hydrologist and senior scientist for the Southwest Florida Water Management District until 1975. Afterwards, he worked as a consultant, in Florida and also internationally, into the 1990s.

=== Private consulting ===
From 1975 to 1988, he entered private consulting practice where he has concentrated his efforts up until 1988 where he retired again.

In a March 17, 1989 interview with his son, Garald Jr. Parker had this to say:

I started out as an educator, and I have always been an educator since. I started out teaching grade school children, high school children, and then I taught in the university system to the postgraduate level. I guided students in professional programs. Perhaps one of the most useful things I have ever done was my development of an understanding of the geology of the state of Florida, and particularly of the two big aquifers Floridan and Biscayne, the water-bearing rock units that supply Florida with its water.

The Floridan Aquifer extends into the coastal plain of Alabama, and there up into the coastal plain of South Carolina. The Biscayne Aquifer is what the people in southeastern Florida depend on as their sole water supply source. Those are things which I did in the course of my work. The welfare of the people of the state depended upon those studies.

Water is life; without water, we have nothing. Without water, we die.

== See also ==
- Floridan Aquifer
