= Floridan aquifer =

American sequence of carbonate rock

The Floridan aquifer system, composed of the Upper and Lower Floridan aquifers, is a sequence of Paleogene carbonate rock which spans an area of about 100,000 square miles (260,000 km^{2}) in the southeastern United States. It underlies the entire state of Florida and parts of Alabama, Georgia, Mississippi, and South Carolina.

The Floridan aquifer system is one of the world's most productive aquifers and supplies drinking water for nearly 10 million people. According to the United States Geological Survey, total withdrawals from the Floridan aquifer system in 2000 were ranked 5th highest of all principal aquifers in the nation at 3,640 million gallons per day (Mgal/d) (13.8 million m^{3}/d; 11,200 acre⋅ft/d). Usage was broken down as 49% (1,949 Mgal/d; 7.38 million m^{3}/d; 5,980 acre⋅ft/d) for irrigation, 33% (1,329 Mgal/d; 5.03 million m^{3}/d; 4,080 acre⋅ft/d) for public water supply, 14% (576 Mgal/d, 2.18 million m^{3}/d; 1,770 acre⋅ft/d) for industrial purposes, and 4% for domestic self-supplied withdrawals. The system is the primary source of drinking water for most cities in central and northern Florida as well as eastern and southern Georgia.

== History ==
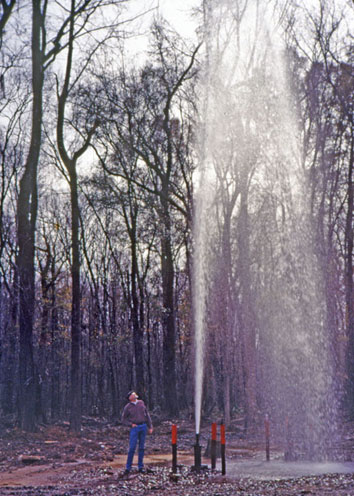
Water under artesian pressure soars from a well tapping the Floridan aquifer system in southern Georgia.

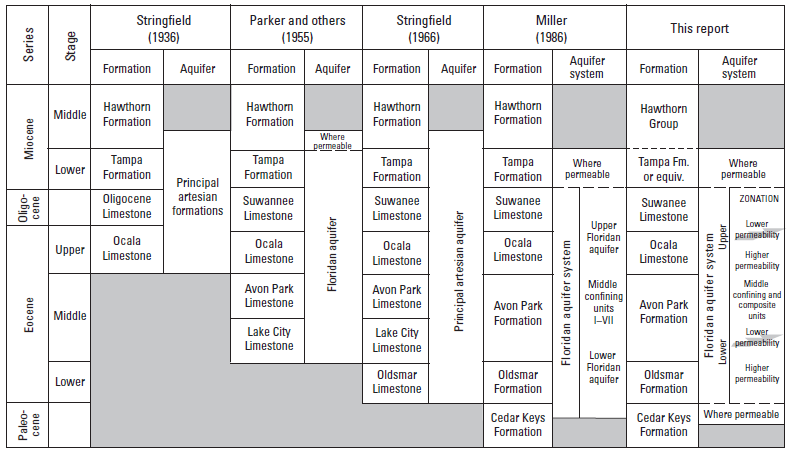
Comparison of hydrogeologic terminology used for the Floridan aquifer system.

In 1936, geologist Victor Timothy (V.T.) Stringfield first identified the existence of the Floridan Aquifer in peninsular Florida and referred to the carbonate units as the "principal artesian formations." In 1944, M.A. Warren of the Georgia Geological Survey described an extension of this system in southern Georgia and applied the term "principal artesian aquifer" to the carbonate rock involved. In 1953 and 1966 Stringfield also applied the term "principal artesian aquifer" to these rocks. In 1955, Garald G. Parker noted the hydrologic and lithologic similarities of the Tertiary carbonate formations in southeast Florida, concluded that they represented a single hydrologic unit, and named that unit the "Floridan aquifer". With additional information collection, more zones of high and low hydraulic conductivity have been identified. As a result, the name Floridan Aquifer has evolved into "Floridan aquifer system", which contains the Upper and Lower Floridan aquifers.

Withdrawals from the Floridan aquifer system began in 1887 when the city of Savannah, Georgia, began to supplement surface water withdrawals from the Savannah River with groundwater. At that time artesian heads in the system were 40 feet (12 m) above land surface, and no pumps were needed; by 1898, it was estimated that between 200 and 300 wells had been finished in southern Georgia, and by 1943 about 3,500 wells had been completed in the six coastal counties of Georgia. By around 1910, development of the Floridan aquifer system had already occurred in Fernandina and Jacksonville and south along the east coast of Florida, as well as from Tampa south to Fort Myers on the west coast. Over time, the number of wells increased, as did the finished depths, as demand increased. Industrial supply for pulp and paper mills became a large proportion of the water withdrawn starting in the late 1930s. In the 1950s, all municipal, domestic, and industrial supply (except cooling), and about half of agricultural supply in Orlando had been converted to groundwater from the Floridan aquifer system. Groundwater withdrawals increased steadily from 630 Mgal/d (2.4 million m^{3}/d; 1,900 acre⋅ft/d) in 1950 to 3,430 Mgal/d (13.0 million m^{3}/d; 10,500 acre⋅ft/d) in 1990. Permitting and regulations enacted during the 1990s curtailed the year-on-year increases in withdrawal; however, withdrawals in 2000 increased to 4,020 Mgal/d (15.2 million m^{3}/d; 12,300 acre⋅ft/d) due to extreme drought conditions between 1999 and 2001 that prevailed over much of the southeastern United States. Much of the increase was for agricultural demand.

== Location ==
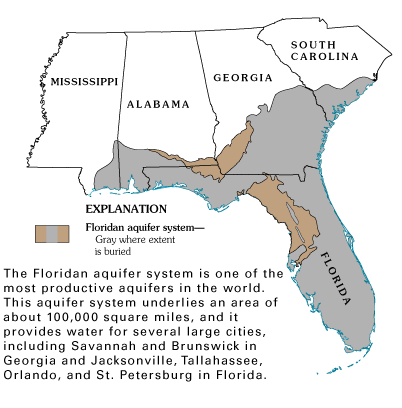
The Floridan aquifer system underlies portions of five states. Source: USGS

The Floridan aquifer system spans an area of about 100,000 square miles (260,000 km^{2}) in the southeastern United States and underlies all of Florida and parts of southern Alabama, southeastern Georgia, and southern South Carolina. The Upper Floridan aquifer contains freshwater over much of its extent, though it is brackish with increasing salinity south of Lake Okeechobee.

The Floridan aquifer system crops out in central and southern Georgia where the limestone and its weathered byproducts are present at land surface. The aquifer generally dips below the land surface to the south where it becomes buried beneath surficial sand deposits and clay. In areas depicted in brown in the image at the right, the aquifer crops out and is again exposed at land surface. These regions are particularly prone to sinkhole activity due to the proximity of the karstified limestone aquifer to land surface. Some of the fractures/conduits within the aquifer are large enough for scuba divers to swim through.

== Hydrology and geology ==
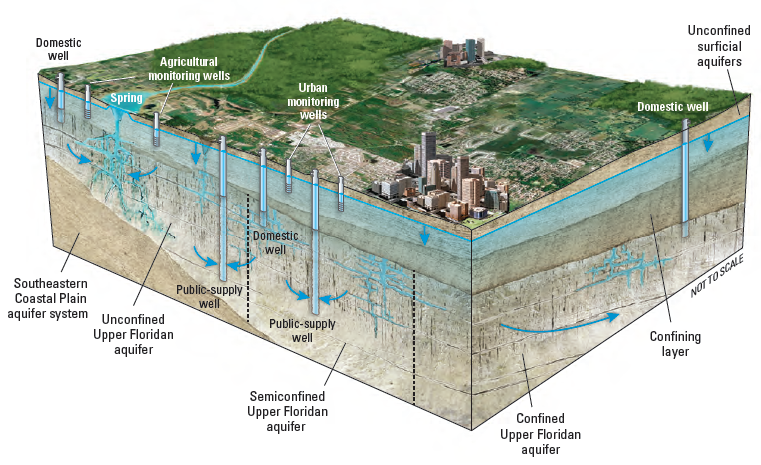
Idealized geologic diagram showing the confining layer that separates the Upper Floridan and surficial aquifers and plays an important role in determining water quality in the Upper Floridan aquifer (from Berndt and others, 2015).

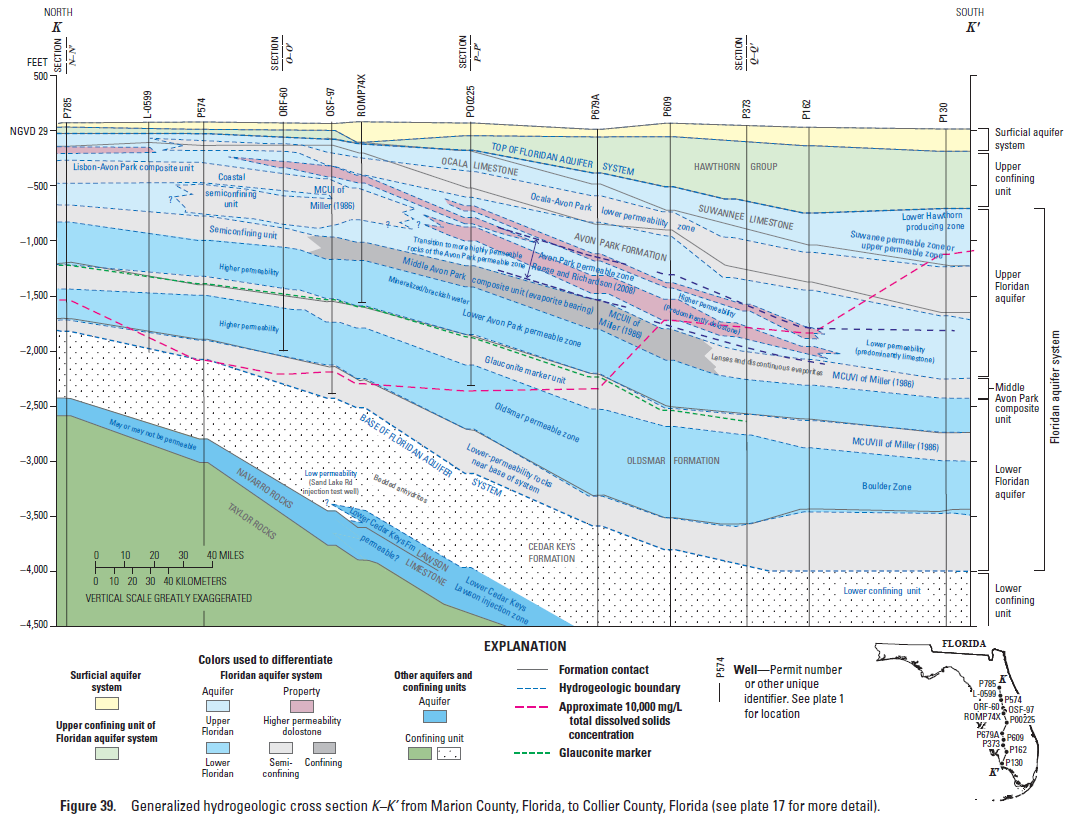
Generalized cross section from Marion County, Florida, to Collier County, Florida.

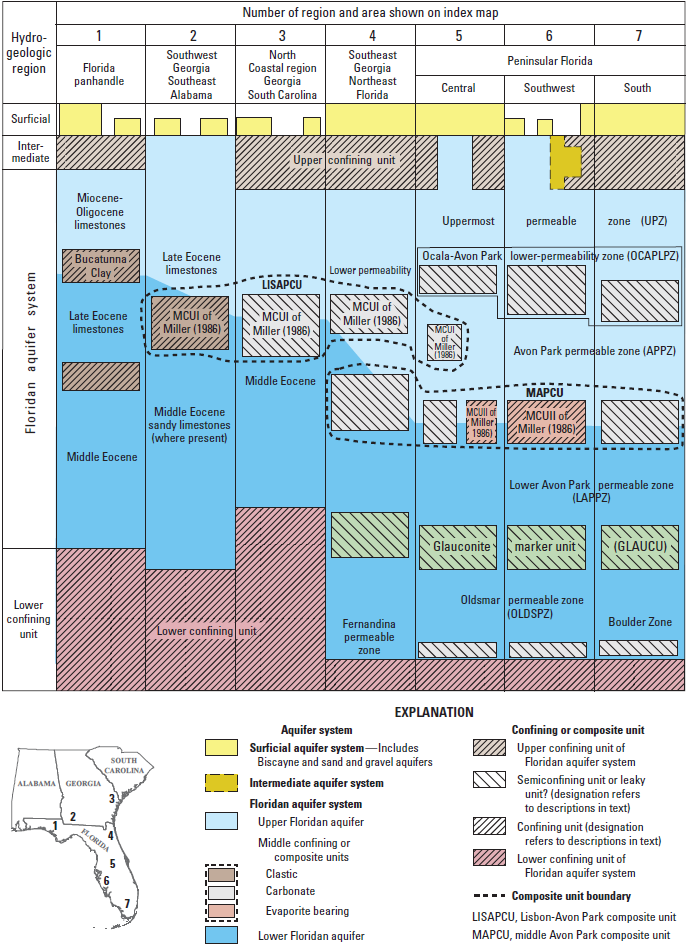
Aquifers and composite and confining units of the Floridan aquifer system, southeastern United States.

The carbonate rocks that form the aquifer are of late Paleocene to early Oligocene age and are overlain by low-permeability clays of Miocene age (upper confining unit) and surficial sands of Pliocene and Holocene age (surficial aquifer system). In west-central Florida, northern Florida, and along the updip margin of the system, the limestone crops out and the aquifer system is unconfined. Where low-permeability clays of the upper confining unit are present and substantial, the system is confined and groundwater is contained under pressure. The upper confining unit is particularly thick in coastal Georgia and south Florida; downward leakage of water through the upper confining unit in these areas is minimal, and the aquifer system is thickly confined. Low permeability limestone rocks of Paleocene age (e.g. Cedar Keys Formation) form the base of the Floridan aquifer system. The aquifer ranges in thickness from less than 100 feet (30 m) in updip areas where the rocks outcrop to more than 3,700 feet (1,100 m) in southwestern Florida. Recharge, flow, and natural discharge are largely controlled by the degree of confinement provided by upper confining units, the interaction of streams with the aquifer in its unconfined areas, and the interaction between fresh and saline water along the coastlines.

Where the system is at or near land surface (areas shaded brown in image above), clays are thin or absent, dissolution of the limestone is intensified, and many artesian springs and sinkholes are apparent. Transmissivity of the aquifer in karstified areas such as these is much higher owing to the development of large, well-connected conduits within the rock (see image at right). Springs form where the water pressure is great enough for the groundwater to flow out on the land surface. More than 700 springs have been mapped in Florida. For example, Wakulla Springs in Wakulla County has a flow rate of 200–300 million US gallons (0.76–1.14 million cubic metres; 610–920 acre-feet) of water per day. A record peak flow from the spring on April 11, 1973, was measured at 14,324 US gallons (54.22 m^{3}) per second – equal to 1.24 billion US gal (4.68 million m^{3}; 3,800 acre⋅ft) per day.

The system is composed of two main aquifers: the Upper Floridan aquifer and the Lower Floridan aquifer. These aquifers are separated by sediments that range from low-permeability clays in the panhandle (Bucatunna Clay) and low-permeability dolomites and gypsiferous anhydrite in west-central Florida to permeable limestones along the east coast of Florida and elsewhere. Where these intervening sediments and rock are permeable, the Upper and Lower Floridan aquifers behave as a single unit. Conversely, where the intervening sediments are less permeable, there is less hydraulic connection between the Upper and Lower Floridan aquifers.

=== Upper Floridan aquifer ===
The Upper Floridan aquifer is the main source of water withdrawn from the Floridan aquifer system due to high yields and proximity to land surface. Groundwater is fresh in most areas, though locally may be brackish or saline, particularly in coastal areas with saltwater intrusion problems, and in South Florida. The Upper Floridan aquifer includes the uppermost or shallowest permeable zones in the Floridan aquifer system. In the northern half of the study area, this aquifer behaves as a single hydrogeologic unit and is undifferentiated. In the southern half of the study area, including most of central and southern Florida, the aquifer is thick and can be differentiated into three distinct zones, namely the uppermost permeable zone, the Ocala Lower-Permeability Zone, and the Avon Park Permeable Zone.

The base of the Upper Floridan aquifer is marked by two composite units (see below) and one confining unit in the middle part of the Floridan aquifer system: the Lisbon-Avon Park Composite Unit or the Middle Avon Park Composite Unit, and the Bucatunna Clay Confining Unit. In updip areas, the base of the Upper Floridan is either coincident with the top of the confining units above the Claiborne, Lisbon, or Gordon aquifers, or it lies above any clay bed that marks the boundary between mostly carbonate and mostly clastic units or previously mapped numbered middle confining units (MCUs).. If one or more evaporite units are present, such as MCUIII near Valdosta or MCUII in southwestern Florida, the base of the aquifer is coincident with the top of the evaporite unit. In regions where no distinct lower permeability unit is known to be present, the base is extrapolated along a horizon that allows for a stratigraphic grouping of permeable rock into the upper or lower parts of the aquifer system. In southeastern Alabama, northern Florida, Georgia, and South Carolina, the stratigraphic units are grouped into the Lisbon-Avon Park Composite Unit. In peninsular Florida, this horizon is coincident with one or more evaporite-bearing or non-evaporite-bearing units of the Middle Avon Park Composite Unit. In the panhandle of Florida and southwest Alabama, the base is coincident with the top of the Bucatunna Clay Confining Unit.

==== Middle Confining and Composite Units ====
The hydrogeologic framework of the Floridan aquifer system was revised by the U.S. Geological Survey in 2015. The extent of the system was revised to include some of the updip clastic facies which grade laterally into the Lower Floridan aquifer and have been previously included in the Southeastern Coastal Plain aquifer system, the Floridan aquifer system, or both. A new method for dividing the Upper and Lower Floridan aquifers was proposed and a new term, "composite unit", was introduced to refer to regionally extensive litho-stratigraphic units of rock, previously classified as one of eight MCUs which have been found to be neither confining nor permeable across their entire extents. Three regionally mappable litho-stratigraphic units are used to consistently divide the Upper and Lower Floridan aquifer in the revised framework: the Bucatunna Clay Confining Unit, the Middle Avon Park Composite Unit, and the Lisbon-Avon Park Composite Unit. The Upper and Lower Floridan aquifers behave as a single hydrogeologic unit in areas where these composite units are leaky.

=== Lower Floridan aquifer ===
The lower aquifer is generally less permeable than the upper, and the water produced can be highly mineralized and/or saline; however, the lower aquifer is relatively fresh water to the base of the system in central Florida and in updip areas of central and southern Georgia and Alabama. A new basal permeable zone is mapped throughout the Florida peninsula and slightly into southeastern Georgia that incorporates the previously established Boulder Zone and Fernandina permeable zone; this more extensive unit is called the Oldsmar permeable zone. The Oldsmar permeable zone appears to have higher permeability, far greater than the cavernous areas of the Boulder and Fernandina permeable zones, and contains freshwater in the central peninsula area. This newly delineated areally extensive basal unit containing freshwater may influence the movement of freshwater water through the deepest part of the aquifer system toward the discharge areas. The Oldsmar permeable zone is of interest because it may be an important alternative source of water where it is confined (and isolated) beneath the Upper Floridan aquifer and may be important to the offshore movement of groundwater in areas previously unknown.

== General hydraulic characteristics ==
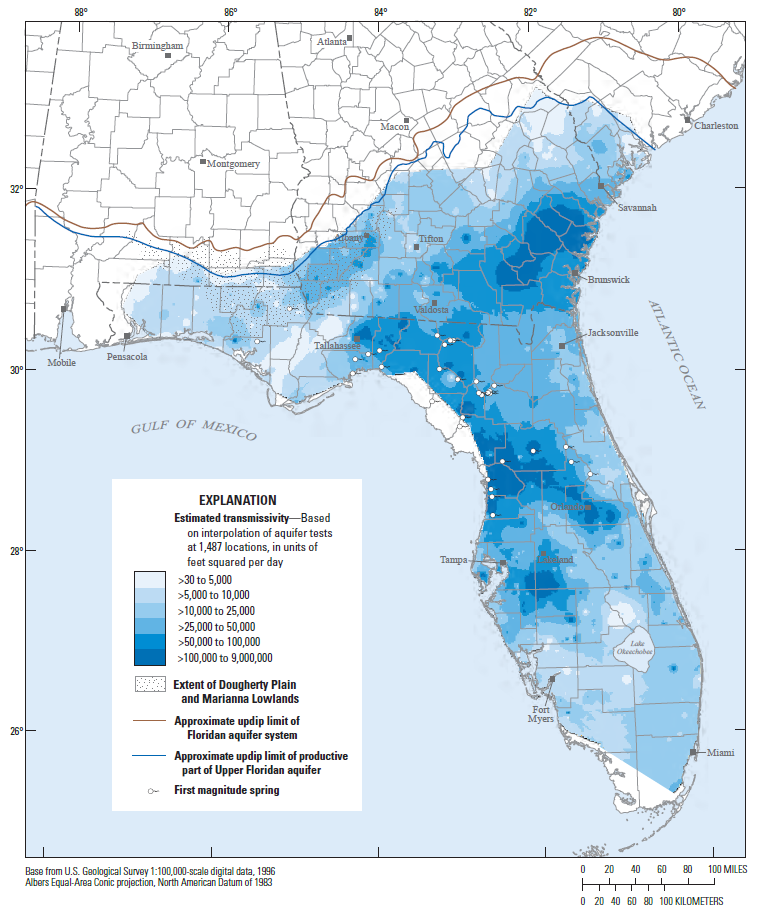
Estimated transmissivity of the Floridan aquifer system.

The carbonate rocks that compose the Floridan aquifer system have highly variable hydraulic properties, including porosity and permeability. Transmissivity has been reported over a range of more than six orders of magnitude, from less than 8 ft^{2}/d (0.74 m^{2}/d) to greater than 9,000,000 ft^{2}/d (840,000 m^{2}/d), with the majority of values ranging from 10,000 to 100,000 ft^{2}/d (930–9,290 m^{2}/d). Where the aquifer is unconfined or thinly confined, infiltrating water dissolves the rock and transmissivity tends to be relatively high. Where the aquifer is thickly confined, less dissolution occurs and transmissivity tends to be lower. In the first regional map depicting transmissivity variation across the aquifer, Miller showed that transmissivity values exceed 250,000 ft^{2}/d (23,000 m^{2}/d) where the aquifer system is either unconfined or thinly confined. In areas where the aquifer is thickly confined, Miller indicated lower transmissivity was related primarily to textural changes and secondarily to the thickness of the rocks. Micritic limestone in southern Florida and in the updip outcrop areas was identified as having much lower transmissivity than elsewhere in the system.

== Sinkholes ==
Sinkhole Formation Processes

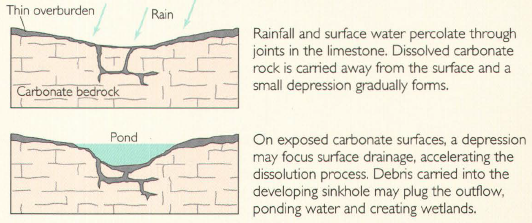
Dissolution sinkholes form when soluble rocks, such as limestone or dolomite come into contact with a dissolving agent such as water. Dissolution is intensified in areas where flow of water is focused, such as along joints, fractures, and bedding planes within the rock, creating preferential flow paths.

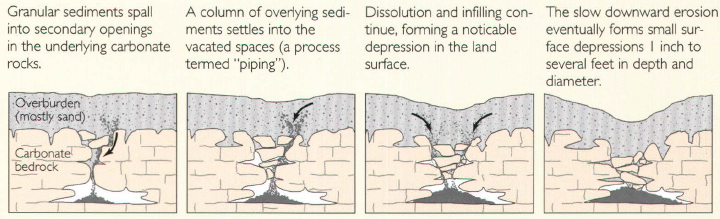
Cover-subsidence sinkholes tend to form gradually where the covering sediments are permeable and contain sand. In areas where cover material is thicker or sediments contain more clay, cover-subsidence sinkholes are relatively uncommon, are smaller, and may go undetected for long periods.

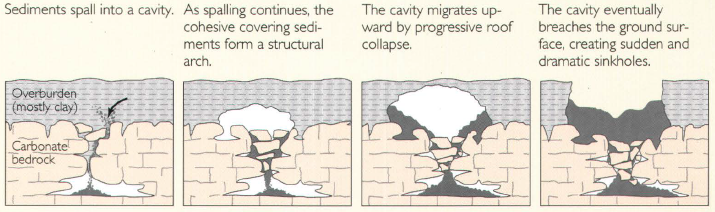
Cover-collapse sinkholes may develop abruptly (over a period of hours) and cause catastrophic damages. They occur where the covering sediments contain a significant amount of clay. One of the more notable examples of such a sinkhole is the Winter Park sinkhole of 1981 that swallowed a public swimming pool, part of a car dealership, and a home located in Winter Park, FL

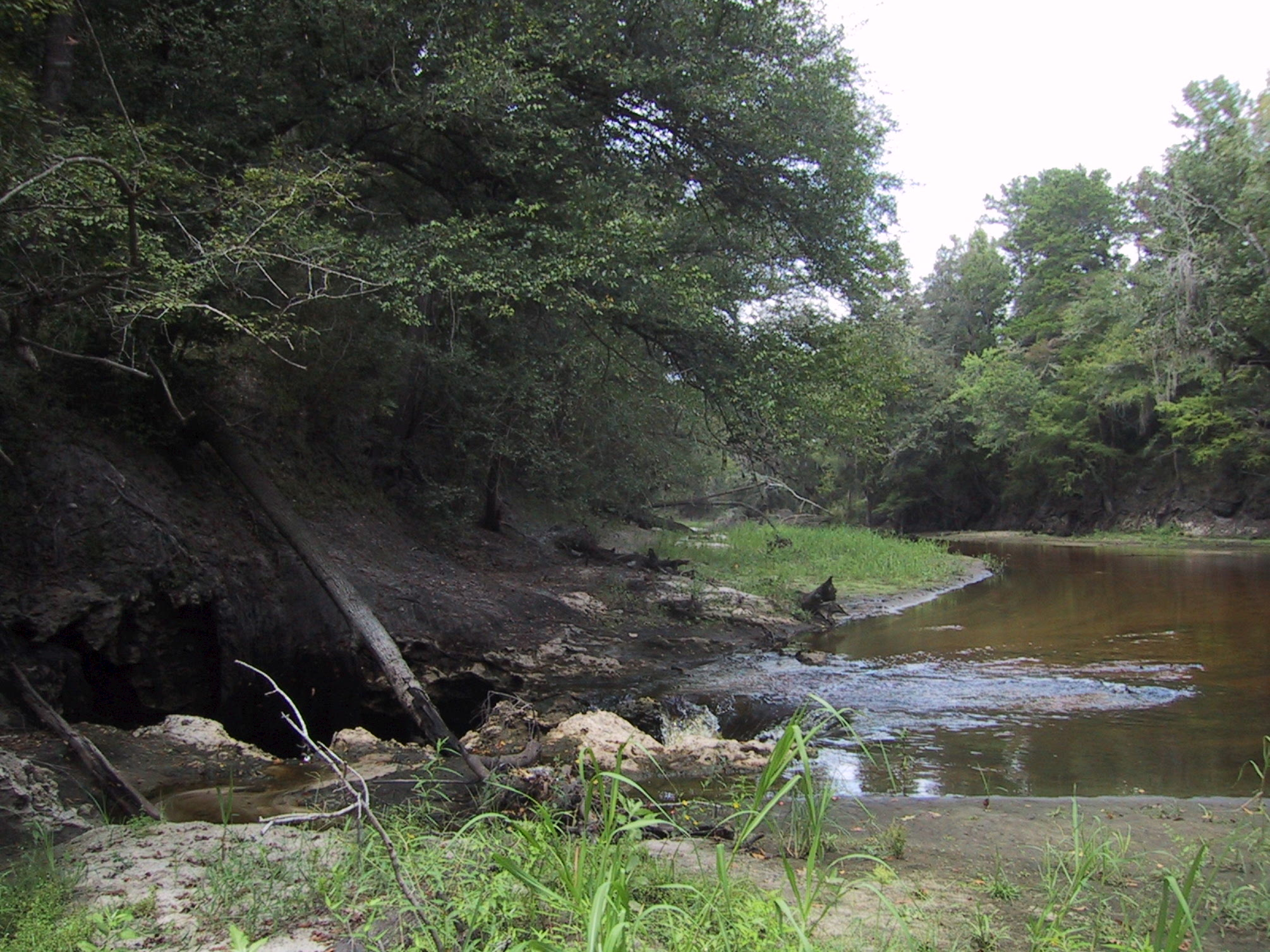
Image of the entire surface water flow of the Alapaha River near Jennings, Florida going into a sinkhole leading to the Upper Floridan aquifer.

Sinkholes are common where the rock below the land surface is limestone, carbonate rock, salt beds, or rocks that can naturally be dissolved by groundwater circulating through them. As the rock dissolves, spaces and caverns develop underground. If there is not enough support for the land above the spaces, then a sudden collapse of the land surface can occur. These collapses can be small or they can be huge and can occur where a house or road is on top.

Sinkholes can be classified on the basis of the processes by which they are formed: dissolution, cover-subsidence, and cover-collapse. Formation of sinkholes can be accelerated by intense withdrawals of groundwater over short periods of time, such as those caused by pumping for frost protection of winter crops in west-central Florida. Sinkholes that developed beneath gypsum stacks in 1994 and 2016 caused a loss of millions of gallons mineralized water containing phosphogypsum and phosphoric acid, by-products of the production of fertilizer from phosphate rock. These sinkholes were likely formed from the collapse of preexisting dissolution cavities in the limestone beneath the stacks. Lake Jackson near Tallahassee occasionally drains into a sinkhole in the bottom of the lake bed when water levels in the aquifer drop. Dover Sinkhole, located along the Peace River near Bartow, was witnessed draining about 10 Mgal/d (38,000 m^{3}/d) of water from the Peace River during June 2006.

== Springs ==
There are 824 springs inventoried across the Floridan aquifer system, of which 751 are located in Florida, 17 in Alabama, and 56 in Georgia. Springs are classified according to median value of all available discharge measurements.

Magnitude	Flow (ft³/s, gal/min, pint/min)	Flow (L/s)
1st magnitude	> 100 ft³/s	> 2800 L/s
2nd magnitude	10 to 100 ft³/s	280 to 2800 L/s
3rd magnitude	1 to 10 ft³/s	28 to 280 L/s
4th magnitude	100 US gal/min to 1 ft³/s (448 US gal/min)	6.3 to 28 L/s
5th magnitude	10 to 100 gal/min	0.63 to 6.3 L/s
6th magnitude	1 to 10 gal/min	63 to 630 mL/s
7th magnitude	2 pint/min to 1 gal/min	8 to 63 mL/s
8th magnitude	< 1 pint/min	< 8 mL/s
0 magnitude	no flow (sites of past/historic flow)	

In Florida, there are 33 magnitude 1 springs, the more notable of which include:

- Spring Creek (Wakulla County)
- Three Sisters Springs (Citrus County)
- Silver Springs (Marion County)
- Rainbow Springs (Marion County)
- Wakulla Spring (Wakulla County)
- Wacissa Spring Group (Jefferson County)
- Ichetucknee Springs (Columbia County)
- Weeki Wachee Springs (Hernando County)
- Juniper Springs (Marion County)

In Georgia, there is one magnitude 1 spring, Radium Spring, which no longer flows during drought conditions; there are six magnitude 2 and five magnitude 3 springs. The largest of the 17 springs in Alabama are three magnitude 3 springs; there are no springs in South Carolina of magnitude 3 or higher. Many springs are known to exist offshore in the Gulf of Mexico and Atlantic Ocean, however the magnitude of discharge from these springs is largely unknown. Crescent Beach spring, located approximately 2.5 miles (4.0 km) offshore of Crescent Beach, Florida, was estimated to flow at a rate of up to 1,500 cu ft/s (42 m^{3}/s), or 970 million US gal/d (3.7 million m^{3}/d; 3,000 acre⋅ft/d).

== See also ==
- Agriculture in Florida
- Biscayne Aquifer
- Kissingen Springs
- Woodville Karst Plain
- Gulf Trough
- Cave diving
- Water wars in Florida
- Fountain of Youth
