= Marjory Stoneman Douglas =

American journalist (1890–1998)

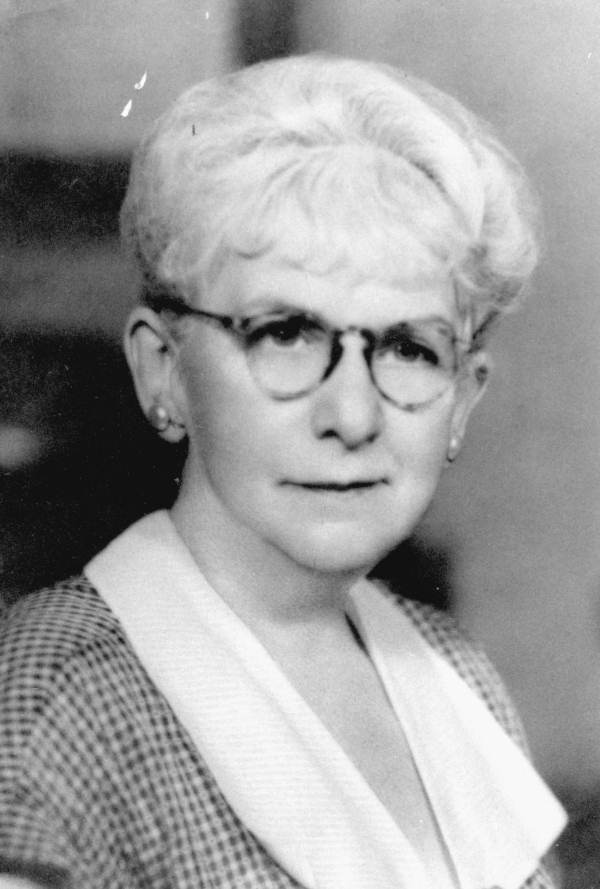
- Born: Marjory Stoneman; April 7, 1890; Minneapolis, Minnesota, U.S.
- Died: May 14, 1998 (aged 108); Coconut Grove, Miami, Florida, U.S.
- Education: Wellesley College
- Occupations: Journalist; writer; activist
- Known for: Everglades conservation advocacy
- Spouse: Kenneth Douglas (m. 1914; div. 1915)
- Awards: Presidential Medal of Freedom (1993)

Marjory Stoneman Douglas (April 7, 1890 – May 14, 1998) was an American journalist, author, women's suffrage advocate, and conservationist known for her staunch defense of the Everglades against efforts to drain it and reclaim land for development. Moving to Miami as a young woman to work for The Miami Herald, she became a freelance writer, producing over one hundred short stories that were published in popular magazines. Her most influential work was the book The Everglades: River of Grass (1947), which redefined the popular conception of the Everglades as a treasured river instead of a worthless swamp. Its impact has been compared to that of Rachel Carson's influential book Silent Spring (1962). Her books, stories, and journalism career brought her influence in Miami, enabling her to advance her causes.

As a young woman, Douglas was outspoken and politically conscious of the women's suffrage and civil rights movements. She was called upon to take a central role in the protection of the Everglades when she was 79 years old. For the remaining 29 years of her life she was "a relentless reporter and fearless crusader" for the natural preservation and restoration of South Florida. Her tireless efforts earned her several variations of the nickname "Grande Dame of the Everglades" as well as the hostility of agricultural and business interests looking to benefit from land development in Florida. She received numerous awards, including the Presidential Medal of Freedom, and was inducted into several halls of fame.

Douglas lived to 108, working until nearly the end of her life for Everglades restoration. Upon her death, an obituary in The Independent in London stated, "In the history of the American environmental movement, there have been few more remarkable figures than Marjory Stoneman Douglas."

== Early life ==
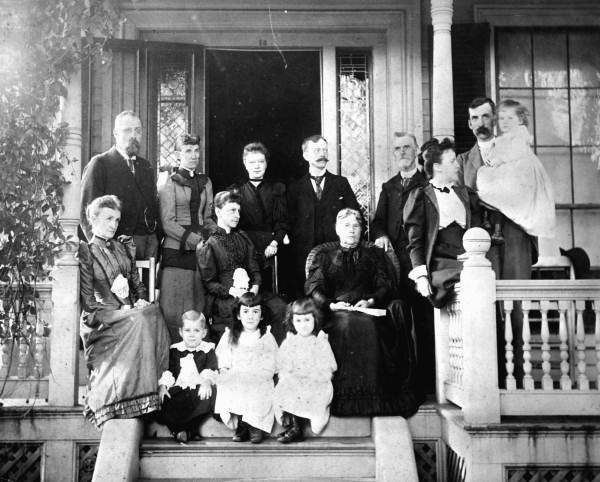
The Stoneman and Trefethen extended family in 1893. Marjory is held by her father on the far right.

Marjory Stoneman was born on April 7, 1890, in Minneapolis, Minnesota, the only child of concert violinist Florence Lillian Trefethen and Frank Bryant Stoneman. One of her earliest memories was her father reading to her The Song of Hiawatha; she burst into sobs upon hearing that the tree had to give its life to provide Hiawatha the wood for a canoe. She was an early and voracious reader. Her first book was Alice's Adventures in Wonderland, which she kept well into adulthood until "some fiend in human form must have borrowed it and not brought it back". She visited Florida when she was four, and her most vivid memory of the trip was picking an orange from a tree at the Tampa Bay Hotel. From there she and her parents embarked on a cruise from Tampa to Havana.

Marjory's parents separated when she was six. Her father endured a series of failed entrepreneurial ventures and the instability caused her mother to move them abruptly to the Trefethen family house in Taunton, Massachusetts. She lived there with her mother, aunt, and grandparents, who did not get along well and consistently spoke ill of her father, to her dismay. Her mother, whom Marjory characterized as "high-strung", was committed to a mental sanitarium in Providence several times. Her parents' separation and the contentiousness of her mother's family caused her to suffer from night terrors. She credited her tenuous upbringing with making her "a skeptic and a dissenter" for the rest of her life.

As a youth, Marjory found solace in reading, and eventually, she began to write. At sixteen she contributed to the most popular children's publication of the day, St. Nicholas Magazine—also the first publisher of 20th-century writers F. Scott Fitzgerald, Rachel Carson, and William Faulkner—with a puzzle titled "Double Beheadings and Double Curtailings". In 1907, at seventeen years old, she was awarded a prize by the Boston Herald for "An Early Morning Paddle", a story about a boy who watches a sunrise from a canoe. As her mother's mental health deteriorated, Marjory took on more responsibilities, eventually managing some of the family finances and gaining a maturity imposed upon her by circumstance.

=== Education and marriage ===
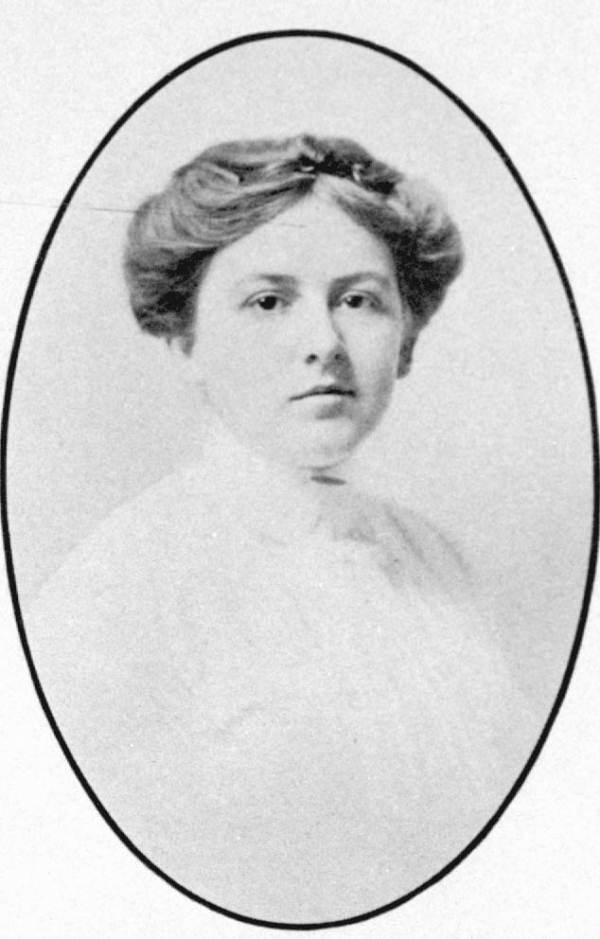
Marjory Stoneman in her senior year at Wellesley College

Marjory left for college in 1908, despite grave misgivings about her mother's mental state. Her aunt and grandmother shared her concerns, but recognized that she needed to leave in order to begin her own life. She was a straight-A student at Wellesley College, graduating with a B.A. in English in 1912. She found particular success in a class on elocution, and joined the first suffrage club with six of her classmates. She was elected Class Orator but was unable to fulfill the office since she was already involved in other activities. During her senior year while visiting home, her mother showed her a lump on her breast. Marjory arranged the surgery to have it removed. After the graduation ceremony, her aunt informed her it had metastasized, and within months her mother was dead. The family left the funeral arrangements up to Marjory.

After drifting with college friends through a few jobs to which she did not feel well-suited, Marjory Stoneman met Kenneth Douglas in 1914. She was so impressed with his manners and surprised at the attention he showed her that she married him within three months. He portrayed himself as a newspaper editor, and was 30 years her senior, but the marriage quickly failed when it became apparent he was a con artist. The true extent of his duplicity Marjory did not entirely reveal, despite her honesty in other matters. Douglas was married to Marjory while already married to another woman. While he spent six months in jail for passing a bad check, she remained faithful. His scheme to scam her absent father out of money worked in Marjory's favor when it attracted Frank Stoneman's attention. Marjory's uncle persuaded her to move to Miami and end the marriage. In the fall of 1915, Marjory Stoneman Douglas left New England to reunite with her father, whom she had not seen since her parents' separation. Shortly before that, her father had married Lillius ("Lilla") Eleanor Shine, a great-great-granddaughter of Thomas Jefferson (her grandfather was Francis W. Eppes). Marjory later wrote that Shine "remained my first and best friend all my life in Florida." After moving to Florida in 1915, Marjory rarely returned to Massachusetts, but retained her affection for it; her 1987 memoir Voice of the River, is dedicated "To Massachusetts, with love."

== Writing career ==
=== The Miami Herald ===
Douglas arrived in South Florida when fewer than 5,000 people lived in Miami and it was "no more than a glorified railroad terminal". Her father, Frank Stoneman, was the first publisher of the paper that later became The Miami Herald. Stoneman passionately opposed the governor of Florida, Napoleon Bonaparte Broward, and his attempts to drain the Everglades. He infuriated Broward so much that when Stoneman won an election for circuit judge, Broward refused to validate the election, so Stoneman was referred to as "Judge" for the rest of his life without performing the duties of one.

Douglas joined the newspaper's staff in 1915. She began as a society columnist writing about tea parties and society events, but news was so slow she later admitted to making up some of her stories: "Somebody would say, 'Who's that Mrs. T.Y. Washrag you've got in your column?' And I would say, 'Oh, you know, I don't think she's been here very long'". When her father went on vacation less than a year after her arrival in Miami, he left her the responsibility of the editorial page. She developed a rivalry with an editor at The Miami Metropolis whose greater familiarity with Miami history gave her cause to make fun of Douglas in writing. Her father scolded her to check her facts better.

Douglas was given an assignment in 1916 to write a story on the first woman from Miami to join the US Naval Reserve. When the woman did not show up for the interview, Douglas herself joined the Navy as a Yeoman (F) first class. It did not suit her; she disliked rising early and her superiors did not appreciate her correcting their grammar, so she requested a discharge and joined the American Red Cross, which stationed her in Paris. She witnessed the tumultuous celebrations on the Rue de Rivoli when the Armistice was signed and cared for war refugees; seeing them displaced and in a state of shock, she wrote, "helped me understand the plight of refugees in Miami sixty years later".

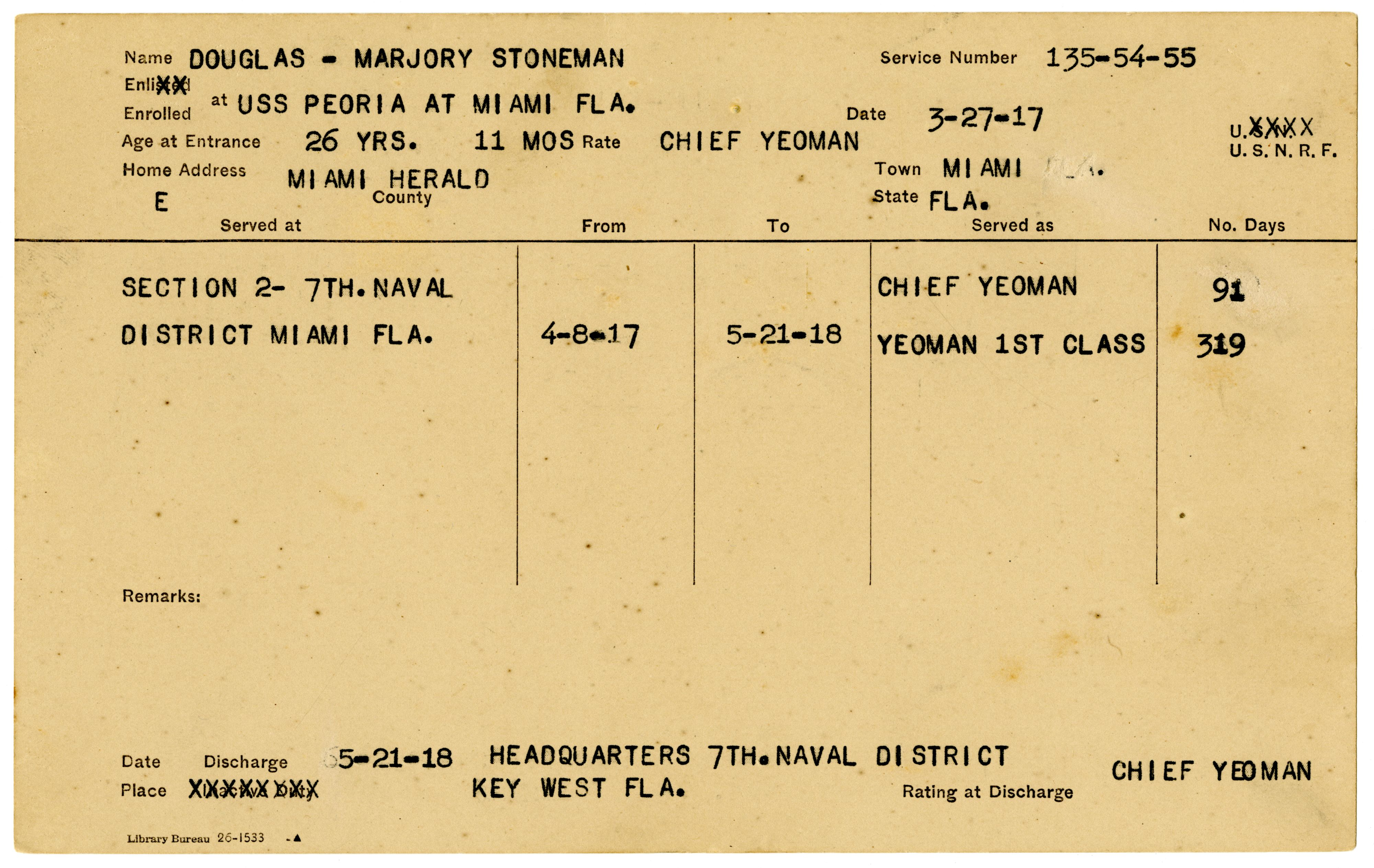
Military record of Douglas in the Navy.

After the war, Douglas served as assistant editor at The Miami Herald. She gained some renown for her daily column, "The Galley", becoming something of a local celebrity. She amassed a devoted readership and attempted to begin each column with a poem. "The Galley" was topical and went in any direction Douglas chose. She promoted responsible urban planning when Miami saw a population boom of 100,000 people in a decade. She wrote supporting women's suffrage, civil rights, and better sanitation while opposing Prohibition and foreign trade tariffs.

Some of the stories she wrote spoke of the region's wealth as being in its "inevitable development", and she supplemented her income with $100 a week from writing copy advertisements that praised the development of South Florida, something she would reconsider later in her life. In the early 1920s she wrote "Martin Tabert of North Dakota is Walking Florida Now", a ballad lamenting the death of a 22-year-old vagrant who was beaten to death in a labor camp. It was printed in The Miami Herald, and read aloud during a session of the Florida Legislature, which passed a law banning convict leasing in large part due to her writing. "I think that's the single most important thing I was ever able to accomplish as a result of something I've written", she wrote in her autobiography.

=== Freelance writer ===
After quitting the newspaper in 1923, Douglas worked as a freelance writer. From 1920 to 1990, Douglas published 109 fiction articles and stories. One of her first stories was sold to the pulp fiction magazine Black Mask for $600 (equivalent to $11,300 in 2025). Forty of her stories were published in The Saturday Evening Post; one, "Story of a Homely Woman", was reprinted in 1937 in the Post's best short stories compilation. Recurring settings in her fiction were South Florida, the Caribbean, and Europe during World War I. Her protagonists were often independent, quirky women or youthful underdogs who encountered social or natural injustices. The people and animals of the Everglades served as subjects for some of her earliest writings. "Plumes", originally published in the Saturday Evening Post in 1930, was based on the murder of Guy Bradley, an Audubon Society game warden, by poachers. "Wings" was a nonfiction story, also first appearing in the Post in 1931, that addressed the slaughter of Everglades wading birds for their feathers. Her story "Peculiar Treasure of a King" was a second-place finalist in the O. Henry Award competition in 1928.

During the 1930s, she was commissioned to write a pamphlet supporting a botanical garden called "An argument for the establishment of a tropical botanical garden in South Florida." Its success caused her to be in demand at garden clubs where she delivered speeches throughout the area, then to serve on the board to support the Fairchild Garden. She called the garden "one of the greatest achievements for the entire area".

Douglas became involved with the Miami Theater, and wrote some one-act plays that were fashionable in the 1930s. One, "The Gallows Gate", was about an argument between a mother and father regarding the character of their son who is sentenced to hang. She got the idea from her father, who had witnessed hangings when he lived in the West and was unnerved by the creaking sound of the rope bearing the weight of the hanging body. The play won a state competition, and eventually $500 in a national competition after it was written into three acts. With William W. Muir, husband of reporter Helen Muir, she authored "Storm Warnings", a play loosely based on the life of mobster Al Capone. Some of Capone's henchmen showed up at the theater, "add[ing] an extra tingle for the audience that night", though no actual problems arose. Douglas wrote the foreword to the Work Projects Administration's guide to Miami and environs, published in 1941 as part of the Federal Writers' Project's American Guide Series.

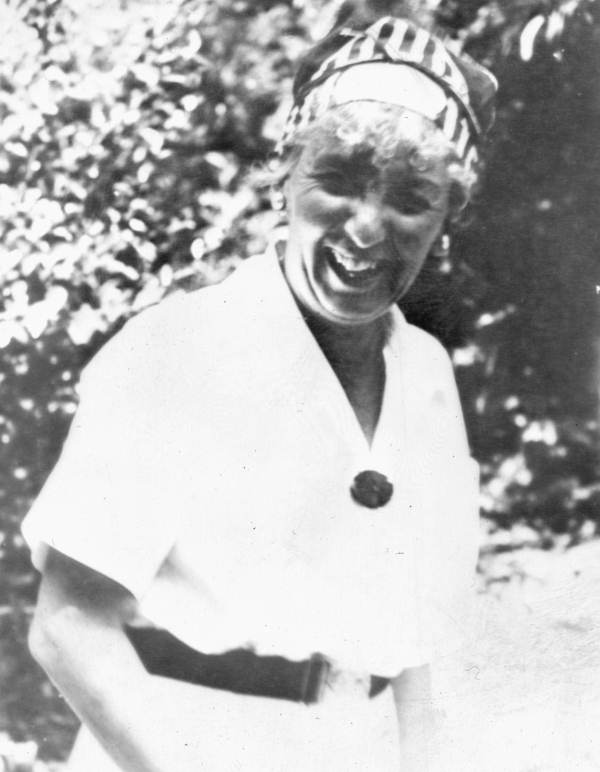
Douglas around 1940.

Douglas served as the book review editor of The Miami Herald from 1942 to 1949, and as editor for the University of Miami Press from 1960 to 1963. She released her first novel, Road to the Sun, in 1952. She wrote four novels, and several nonfiction books on regional topics including Florida birdwatching and David Fairchild, a biologist who imagined a botanical park in Miami. Her autobiography, Marjory Stoneman Douglas: Voice of the River, was written with John Rothchild in 1987. She had been working on a book about W. H. Hudson for years, traveling to Argentina and England several times. It was incomplete when she died in 1998.

=== The Everglades: River of Grass ===
Early in the 1940s, Douglas was approached by a publisher to contribute to the Rivers of America Series by writing about the Miami River. Unimpressed with it, she called the Miami River about "an inch long”, but in researching it she became more interested in the Everglades and persuaded the publisher to allow her to write about the Everglades instead. She spent five years researching what little was known about the ecology and history of the Everglades and South Florida. Douglas spent time with geologist Garald Parker, who discovered that South Florida's sole freshwater source was the Biscayne Aquifer, and it was filled by the Everglades. Parker confirmed the name of the book that has since become the nickname for the Everglades when Douglas, trying to capture the Everglades' essence, asked if she could safely call the fresh water flowing from Lake Okeechobee a river of grass.

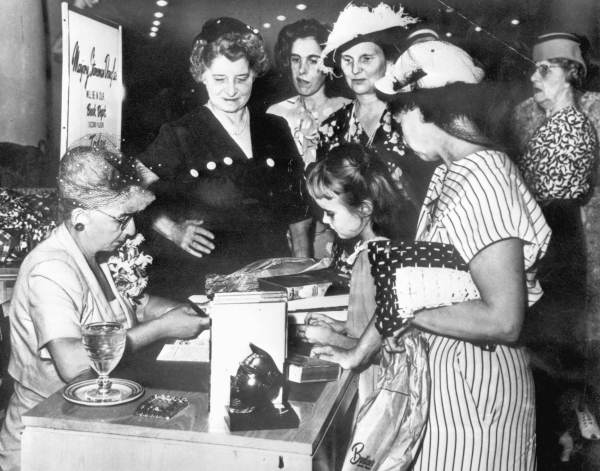
Douglas in 1947 signing autographs at a Burdines department store in Miami.

The Everglades: River of Grass was published in 1947 and sold out of its first printing in a month. The book's first line, "There are no other Everglades in the world", has been called the "most famous passage ever written about the Everglades", and the line once welcomed visitors to the Everglades National Park website. Douglas characterized the Everglades as an ecosystem surrounding a river worthy of protection, inescapably connected to South Florida's people and cultures. She outlined its imminent disappearance in the last chapter, "The Eleventh Hour":

Cattlemen's grass fires roared uncontrolled. Cane-field fires spread crackling and hissing in the saw grass in vast waves and pillars and billowing mountains of heavy, cream-colored, purple-shadowed smoke. Training planes flying over the Glades dropped bombs or cigarette butts, and the fires exploded in the hearts of the drying hammocks and raced on before every wind leaving only blackness ... There was no water in the canals with which to fight [the fires] ... The sweet water the rock had held was gone or had shrunk far down into its strange holes and cleavages.

The Everglades: River of Grass galvanized people to protect the Everglades and has been compared to Rachel Carson's 1962 exposé of the harmful effects of DDT, Silent Spring; both books are "groundbreaking calls to action that made citizens and politicians take notice". Its impact is still felt as it is claimed to be a major reason Florida receives so many tourists, and "remains the definitive reference on the plight of the Florida Everglades". It has gone through numerous editions, selling 500,000 copies since its original publication. The Christian Science Monitor wrote of it in 1997, "Today her book is not only a classic of environmental literature, it also reads like a blueprint for what conservationists are hailing as the most extensive environmental restoration project ever undertaken anywhere in the world". The downside of the book's impact, according to one writer addressing restoration of the Everglades, is that her metaphor of a River of Grass is so predominant that the complex web of ecosystems within the Everglades is oversimplified. David McCally wrote that despite Douglas's "appreciation of the complexity of the environmental system" she described, popular conception of the Everglades shared by people who have not read the book overshadows her detailed explanations.

== Activism ==
Women's suffrage was an early interest of Douglas, and although she tended to shy away from polemics in her early work at The Miami Herald, on her third day as a society columnist, she chose suffrage and began to focus on writing about women in leadership positions. In 1917, she traveled with Mary Baird Bryan, William Jennings Bryan's wife, and two other women to Tallahassee to speak in support of women's right to vote. Douglas was not impressed with the reception the group got from the Florida Legislature. She wrote about her experience later: "All four of us spoke to a joint committee wearing our best hats. Talking to them was like talking to graven images. They never paid attention to us at all." Douglas was able to vote for the first time after she returned from Europe in 1920.

Using her influence at The Miami Herald, Douglas wrote columns about poverty:

You can have the most beautiful city in the world as appearance goes, the streets may be clean and shining, the avenues broad and tree lined, the public buildings dignified, adequate and well kept ... but if you have a weak or inadequate health department, or a public opinion lax on the subject, all the splendors of your city will have not value.

In 1948 Douglas served on the Coconut Grove Slum Clearance Committee, with a friend of hers, Elizabeth Virrick, who was horrified to learn that no running water or sewers were connected to the racially segregated parts of Coconut Grove. They helped pass a law requiring all homes in Miami to have toilets and bathtubs. In the two years it took them to get the referendum passed, they worked to set up a loan operation for the black residents of Coconut Grove, who borrowed the money, interest-free, to pay for the plumbing work. Douglas noted that all of the money loaned was repaid.

=== Everglades work ===
Stoneman Douglas became involved in the Everglades in the 1920s, when she joined the board of the Everglades Tropical National Park Committee, a group led by Ernest F. Coe and dedicated to the idea of making a national park in the Everglades. By the 1960s, the Everglades were in imminent danger of disappearing forever because of gross mismanagement in the name of progress and real estate and agricultural development. Encouraged to get involved by the leaders of environmental groups, in 1969—at the age of 79—Douglas founded Friends of the Everglades to protest the construction of a jetport in the Big Cypress portion of the Everglades. She justified her involvement saying, "It is a woman's business to be interested in the environment. It's an extended form of housekeeping."

She toured the state giving "hundreds of ringing denunciations" of the airport project, and increased membership of Friends of the Everglades to 3,000 within three years. She ran the public information operation full-time from her home and encountered hostility from the jetport's developers and backers, who called her a "damn butterfly chaser". President Richard Nixon, however, scrapped funding for the project due to the efforts of many Everglades watchdog groups.

Douglas continued her activism and focused her efforts on restoring the Everglades after declaring that "Conservation is now a dead word ... You can't conserve what you haven't got." Her criticism was directed at two entities she considered were doing the most damage to the Everglades. A coalition of sugarcane growers, named Big Sugar, she accused of polluting Lake Okeechobee by pumping water tainted with chemicals, human waste, and garbage back into the lake, which served as the fresh water source for the Miami metropolitan area. She compared Florida sugarcane agriculture to sugarcane grown in the West Indies, which, she claimed, was more environmentally sound, had a longer harvest cycle less harmful to soil nutrients, and was less expensive for consumers due to the higher sugar content.

Besides Big Sugar, Douglas spoke about the damage the Army Corps of Engineers was doing to the Everglades by diverting the natural flow of water. The Corps was responsible for constructing more than 1,400 miles (2,300 km) of canals to divert water away from the Everglades after 1947. When the Central & South Florida Project (C&SF), run by former members of the Corps of Engineers, was proposed to assist the Everglades, Douglas initially gave it her approval, as it promised to deliver much-needed water to the shrinking Everglades. However, in application, the project instead diverted more water away from the Everglades, changed water schedules to meet sugarcane farmers' irrigation needs, and flat-out refused to release water to Everglades National Park, until much of the land was unrecognizable. "What a liar I turned out to be!" remarked Douglas, then suggested the motivation behind all the digging and diversion in saying, "Their mommies obviously never let them play with mud pies, so now they take it out on us by playing with cement".

Douglas was giving a speech addressing the harmful practices of the Army Corps of Engineers when the colonel in attendance dropped his pen on the floor. As he was stooping to pick it up, Douglas stopped her speech and said to him, "Colonel! You can crawl under that table and hide, but you can't get away from me!"

In 1973, Douglas attended a meeting addressing conservation of the Everglades in Everglades City, and was observed by John Rothchild:

Mrs. Douglas was half the size of her fellow speakers and she wore huge dark glasses, which along with the huge floppy hat made her look like Scarlett O'Hara as played by Igor Stravinsky. When she spoke, everybody stopped slapping mosquitoes and more or less came to order. She reminded us all of our responsibility to nature and I don't remember what else. Her voice had the sobering effect of a one-room schoolmarm's. The tone itself seemed to tame the rowdiest of the local stone crabbers, plus the developers, and the lawyers on both sides. I wonder if it didn't also intimidate the mosquitoes ... The request for a Corps of Engineers permit was eventually turned down. This was no surprise to those of us who'd heard her speak.

Douglas was not well received by some audiences. She opposed the drainage of a suburb in Dade County named East Everglades. After the county approved building permits in the Everglades, the land flooded as it had for centuries. When homeowners demanded the Army Corps of Engineers drain their neighborhoods, she was the only opposing voice. At the hearing in 1983, she was booed, jeered, and shouted at by the audience of residents. "Can't you boo any louder than that?" she chided, eventually making them laugh. "Look. I'm an old lady. I've been here since eight o'clock. It's now eleven. I've got all night, and I'm used to the heat," she told them. Later, she wrote, "They're all good souls—they just shouldn't be out there." Dade County commissioners eventually decided not to drain.

Florida Governor Lawton Chiles explained her impact, saying, "Marjory was the first voice to really wake a lot of us up to what we were doing to our quality of life. She was not just a pioneer of the environmental movement, she was a prophet, calling out to us to save the environment for our children and our grandchildren."

=== Other causes ===
Douglas also served as a charter member of the first American Civil Liberties Union chapter organized in the South in the 1950s. She lent her support to the Equal Rights Amendment, speaking to the legislature in Tallahassee urging them to ratify it. In the 1980s Douglas lent her support to the Florida Rural Legal Services, a group that worked to protect migrant farm workers who were centered on Belle Glade, and who were primarily employed by the sugarcane industry. She wrote to Governor Bob Graham in 1985 to encourage him to assess the conditions the migrant workers endured. The same year, Douglas approached the Dade County School Board and insisted that the Biscayne Nature Center, which had been housed in hot dog stands, needed a building of its own. The center received a portable building until 1991 when the Florida Department of Education endowed $1.8 million for the Marjory Stoneman Douglas Biscayne Nature Center in Crandon Park. Douglas co-founded the Friends of the Miami-Dade Public Libraries with her longtime friend Helen Muir, and served as its first president.

== Personal life ==
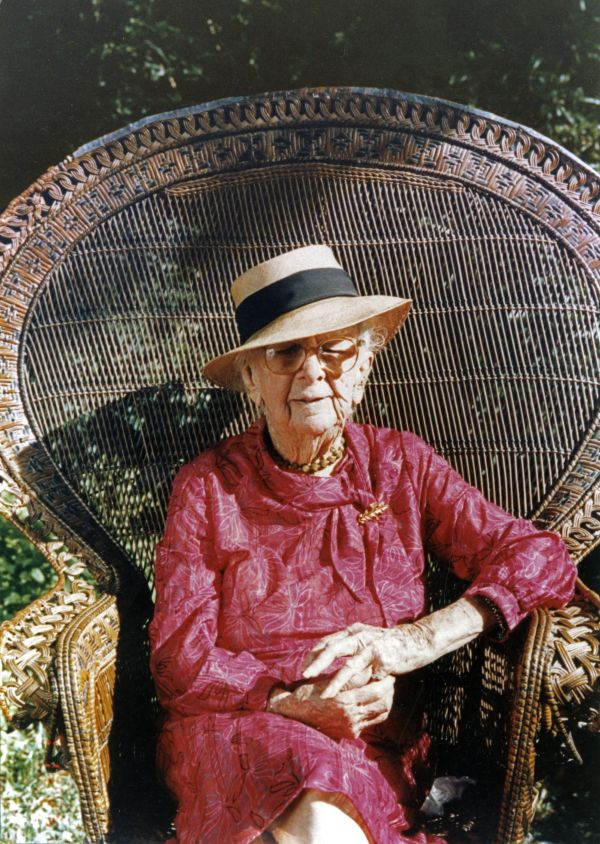
Portrait of Douglas in her later years.

=== Religious views ===
Although Douglas grew up in an Episcopal household, she described herself as agnostic throughout her life, and forbade any religious ceremony at her memorial. Douglas tied her agnosticism to her unanswered prayers when her mother was dying. However, she credited the motivation for her support of women's suffrage to her Quaker paternal grandparents whose dedication to the abolition of slavery she admired, and proudly claimed Levi Coffin, an organizer of the Underground Railroad, was her great-great-uncle. She wrote that his wife was a friend of Harriet Beecher Stowe, and had provided Stowe with the story of Eliza in Uncle Tom's Cabin fleeing slavery because Douglas's great-great-aunt took care of Eliza and her infant after their escape. Frank Stoneman grew up in a Quaker colony, and Douglas maintained he kept touches of his upbringing throughout his life, even after converting to Episcopalianism. Writer Jack Davis and neighbor Helen Muir suggest this Quaker influence was behind Douglas's use of "Friends" in naming the organizations Friends of the Everglades and Friends of the Miami-Dade Public Libraries.

=== Mental health ===
As a child, Douglas was very close with her mother after her parents' separation. She witnessed her mother's emotional unraveling that caused her to be institutionalized, and even long after her mother returned to live with her, she exhibited bizarre, childlike behaviors. Following her mother's death, her relocation to Miami, and her displeasure in working as the assistant editor at The Miami Herald, in the 1920s, she suffered the first of three nervous breakdowns.

Douglas suggested she had what she referred to as "blank periods" before and during her marriage, but they were brief. She connected these lapses to her mother's insanity. She eventually quit the newspaper, but after her father's death in 1941 she suffered a third and final breakdown, when her neighbors found her roaming the neighborhood one night screaming. She realized she had a "father complex", explaining it by saying, "Having been brought up without him all those years, and then coming back and finding him so sympathetic had a powerful effect".

=== Personal habits ===
Regardless of her dedication to the preservation of the Everglades, Douglas admitted the time she spent actually there was sporadic, driving there for occasional picnics. "To be a friend of the Everglades is not necessarily to spend time wandering around out there ... It's too buggy, too wet, too generally inhospitable", she wrote. Instead, she understood that the health of the environment indicated the general well-being of humanity.

Despite Douglas's demure appearance—she stood at 5 feet 2 inches (1.57 m) and weighed 100 pounds (45 kg), and was always immaculately dressed in pearls, a floppy straw hat and gloves—she had an uncanny ability to get her point across. She was known for speaking in perfect, precise paragraphs, and was respected for her dedication and knowledge of her subjects; even her critics admitted her authority on the Everglades. Jeff Klinkenberg, a reporter for the St. Petersburg Times who interviewed and wrote several stories about Douglas, wrote of her, "She had a tongue like a switchblade and the moral authority to embarrass bureaucrats and politicians and make things happen." Douglas was known for haughtily dismissing reporters who had not read her books and asked uninformed questions.

She enjoyed drinking Scotch and sherry; as friend and neighbor Helen Muir remembered her, "She would come up and have a sherry, and then I would walk her home, and then she'd walk me back, and we would have another sherry. What fun she was." Novelist Hervey Allen called Marjory Stoneman Douglas and Muir "the Stewart Avenue Gang". The two were fond of having sherry together and gossiping, but those moments were followed by serious talk of the future of libraries, and the role of women in South Florida. They were confidants, and often shared their work with one another. Douglas never learned to drive and never owned a car. Her house also had no air conditioning, electric stove, or dishwasher.

She was attached to several men after her divorce, counting one of them as the reason she enlisted in the Red Cross, as he had already gone to France as a soldier. However, she said she did not believe in extramarital sex and would not have dishonored her father by being promiscuous. She told Klinkenberg in 1992, frankly, that she had not had sex since her divorce, saying "I wasn't a wild woman". However, she was fond of saying she used the emotion and energy instead on her work. "People don't seem to realize that the energy that goes into sex, all the emotion that surrounds it, can be well employed in other ways", she wrote in her autobiography.

== Awards, death, and legacy ==
=== Honors ===
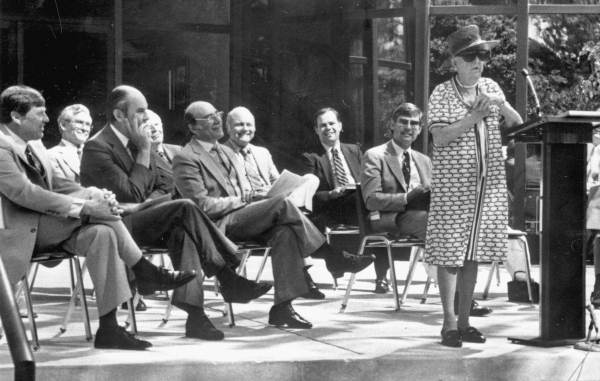
Douglas at the 1980 dedication of the headquarters of Florida Department of Natural Resources.

Douglas began accruing honors in her early days writing for The Miami Herald. In the 1980s, the awards became more prestigious, and her reactions to them mixed. The Florida Department of Natural Resources (now the Florida Department of Environmental Protection) named its headquarters in Tallahassee after her in 1980, which she considered a dubious honor. She told a friend she would have rather seen the Everglades restored than her name on a building. During her polite acceptance speech, she railed against Ronald Reagan and the then-Secretary of the Interior James Watt for their lackluster approach to environmental conservation. In 1986 the National Parks Conservation Association established the Marjory Stoneman Douglas Award, which "honor(s) individuals who often must go to great lengths to advocate and fight for the protection of the National Park System". Despite blindness and diminished hearing, Douglas continued to be active into her second century, and was honored with a visit from Queen Elizabeth II, to whom Douglas gave a signed copy of The Everglades: River of Grass in 1991. Instead of gifts and celebrations, Douglas asked that trees be planted on her birthday, resulting in over 100,000 planted trees across the state and a bald cypress on the lawn of the governor's mansion. The South Florida Water Management District began removing exotic plants that had taken hold in the Everglades when Douglas turned 102.

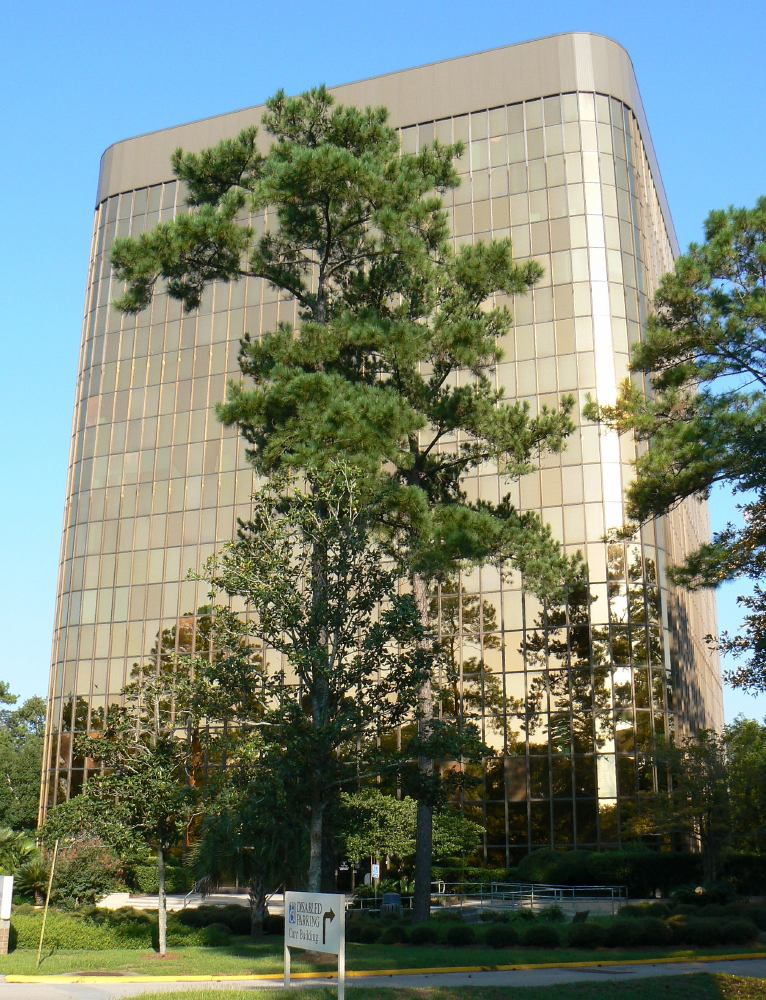
Marjory Stoneman Douglas Building, Tallahassee, Florida, headquarters of Florida Department of Environmental Protection

In 1993, when she was 103, President Bill Clinton awarded Douglas the Presidential Medal of Freedom, the highest civilian honor granted by the United States of America. The citation for the medal read,

Marjory Stoneman Douglas personifies passionate commitment. Her crusade to preserve and restore the Everglades has enhanced our Nation's respect for our precious environment, reminding all of us of nature's delicate balance. Grateful Americans honor the 'Grandmother of the Glades' by following her splendid example in safeguarding America's beauty and splendor for generations to come.

Douglas donated her medal to Wellesley College. Most of the others she received she stored at her home.

Douglas was posthumously inducted into the National Wildlife Federation Hall of Fame in 1999, and the National Women's Hall of Fame in 2000. Upon hearing that she was to be inducted, she questioned, "Why should they have a Women's Hall of Fame, as I heard they wanted to put me in the other day? Why not a Citizens' Hall of Fame?"

Douglas was included in a tribute to pioneering women when television character Lisa Simpson made a papier-mâché bust of her with Georgia O'Keeffe and Susan B. Anthony in an early episode of The Simpsons. She appears as a major supporting character in the 2014 point-and-click adventure A Golden Wake.

Some of Douglas's stories were collected by University of Florida professor Kevin McCarthy in two edited collections: Nine Florida Stories in 1990 and A River In Flood in 1998. McCarthy wrote that he collected Douglas's short stories because most people in the 1990s were well aware of her as an environmentalist but did not know about her career as a freelance writer. "Probably no other person has been as important to the environmental well-being of Florida than this little lady from Coconut Grove", McCarthy wrote in the introduction to A River in Flood.

=== Remembrances ===
Marjory Stoneman Douglas died at the age of 108 on May 14, 1998. John Rothchild, who helped write her autobiography, said that her death was the only thing that could "shut her up" and added, "The silence is terrible." Carl Hiaasen eulogized her in The Miami Herald, writing that The Everglades: River of Grass was "monumental", and praised her passion and her resolve; even when politicians finally found value in the Everglades and visited her for a photo opportunity, she still provoked them to do more and do it faster.

The National Wildlife Federation described her as "a passionate, articulate, and tireless voice for the environment". Chairman of the Florida Audubon Society Ed Davison remembered her, saying, "She kept a clear vision of the way things ought to be, and she didn't give a lot of credibility to excuses about why they're not like that. She would give these wonderful, curmudgeonly speeches to which there was no response. You can't holler back to grandmotherly scolding. All you can do is shuffle your feet and say, 'Yes, Ma'am.'" She was aware of it, once saying, "People can't be rude to me, this poor little old woman. But I can be rude to them, poor darlings, and nobody can stop me." Her ashes were scattered in the 1,300,000-acre (5,300 km^{2}) Marjory Stoneman Douglas Wilderness Area in Everglades National Park, which was named for her in 1997.

In 2000, the Naples, Florida-based composer Steve Heitzeg wrote a 15-minute orchestra piece entitled Voice of the Everglades (Epitaph for Marjory Stoneman Douglas) for the Naples Philharmonic. Heitzeg said, "She was outspoken, she was direct, she had the energy and belief to make the world a better place."

Two South Florida public schools are named in her honor: Broward County Public Schools' Marjory Stoneman Douglas High School (opened in 1990, the year of her 100th birthday) and Miami-Dade County Public Schools' Marjory Stoneman Douglas Elementary School.

=== Douglas home ===
Douglas's cottage in Coconut Grove at 3744–3754 Stewart Avenue, was built in 1924. She wrote all of her major books and stories there, and the City of Miami designated it an historic site in 1995, not only for its famous owner but also for its unique Masonry Vernacular architecture. After Douglas's death, Friends of the Everglades proposed making the house part of an education center about Douglas and her life, but neighbors protested, citing issues with parking, traffic, and an influx of visitors to the quiet neighborhood. The house, which had an exterior floodwater line from the 1926 Miami Hurricane and some damage from an infestation of bees, had fallen further into disrepair. For a while, the idea of moving the house to Fairchild Tropical Botanic Garden in Coral Gables, which Douglas helped to develop and where there is a life-size bronze statue to commemorate her efforts, was considered. The State of Florida owns Douglas's house and in April 2007 placed it in the care of the Florida Park Service, a division of the Florida Department of Environmental Protection. Restoration of the floors and counters took place in the following months. Water service was reconnected to the house and the electrical system was updated for safety purposes. All work was approved by the Department of Historic Resources. A park ranger was placed as a resident in the Douglas house to help maintain the structure and property.

On April 22, 2015, while giving an Earth Day speech in the Everglades, President Barack Obama announced that Interior Secretary Sally Jewell had designated the house a National Historic Landmark.

== Works ==
=== Books ===
- The Everglades: River of Grass. Rinehart, 1947. OCLC 959200390
- Road to the Sun. Rinehart, 1952. OCLC 851571457
- Freedom River Florida 1845. Charles Scribner's Sons, 1953. OCLC 299869 ASIN B000TY0Y0S LCCN 53-12263 (novel for young readers)
- Hurricane. Rinehart, 1958 (revised, 1976). ISBN 9780891760153, OCLC 4106064
- Alligator crossing. John Day, 1959. OCLC 51009556 ISBN 157131640X (novel for young readers; synopsis at milkweed.org)
- The Key to Paris. Keys to the Cities Series. Lippincott, 1961. OCLC 750448010
- Florida the Long Frontier. Harper & Row, 1967. OCLC 168513
- The Joys of Bird Watching in Florida. Hurricane House, 1969. OCLC 85431
- Adventures in a Green World – The Story of David Fairchild and Barbour Lathrop. Field Research Projects. 1973. OCLC 984925 LCCN 74-173654
- Marjory Stoneman Douglas: Voice of the River. with John Rothchild. Pineapple Press, Inc. 1987. ISBN 9780910923330, OCLC 15133543 LCCN 87-2242; Douglas, Marjory Stoneman (March 1990). 1990 pbk edition. Pineapple Press. ISBN 978-0-910923-94-1.

=== Short story collections ===
- Nine Florida Stories by Marjory Stoneman Douglas. Ed. Kevin M. McCarthy. University of North Florida, 1990. ISBN 9780813009827, OCLC 20595935
  - "Pineland"
  - "A Bird Dog in the Hand"
  - "He Man"
  - "Twenty Minutes Late for Dinner"
  - "Plumes"
  - "By Violence"
  - "Bees in the Mango Bloom"
  - "September-Remember"
  - "The Road to the Horizon"
- A River in Flood and Other Florida Stories by Marjory Stoneman Douglas. Ed. Kevin M. McCarthy. University Press of Florida, 1998. ISBN 9780813016221, OCLC 39340225
  - "At Home on the Marcel Waves"
  - "Solid Mahogany"
  - "Goodness Gracious, Agnes"
  - "A River in Flood"
  - "The Mayor of Flamingo"
  - "Stepmother"
  - "You Got to Go, But You Don't Have to Come Back"
  - "High-Goal Man"
  - "Wind Before Morning"
