= The Everglades: River of Grass =

1947 Non-fiction book by Marjory Stoneman Douglas

- First edition cover
- Author: Marjory Stoneman Douglas
- Language: English
- Genre: Nonfiction
- Publisher: Rinehart & Company
- Publication date: November 6, 1947
- Publication place: United States
- Media type: Print (Hardcover and Paperback)
- Pages: 406 pp

The Everglades: River of Grass is a non-fiction book written by Marjory Stoneman Douglas in 1947. Published the same year as the formal opening of Everglades National Park, the book was a call to attention about the degrading quality of life in the Everglades and remains an influential book on nature conservation as well as a reference for information on South Florida. It was used as recently as 2007 by The New York Times.

== Background ==
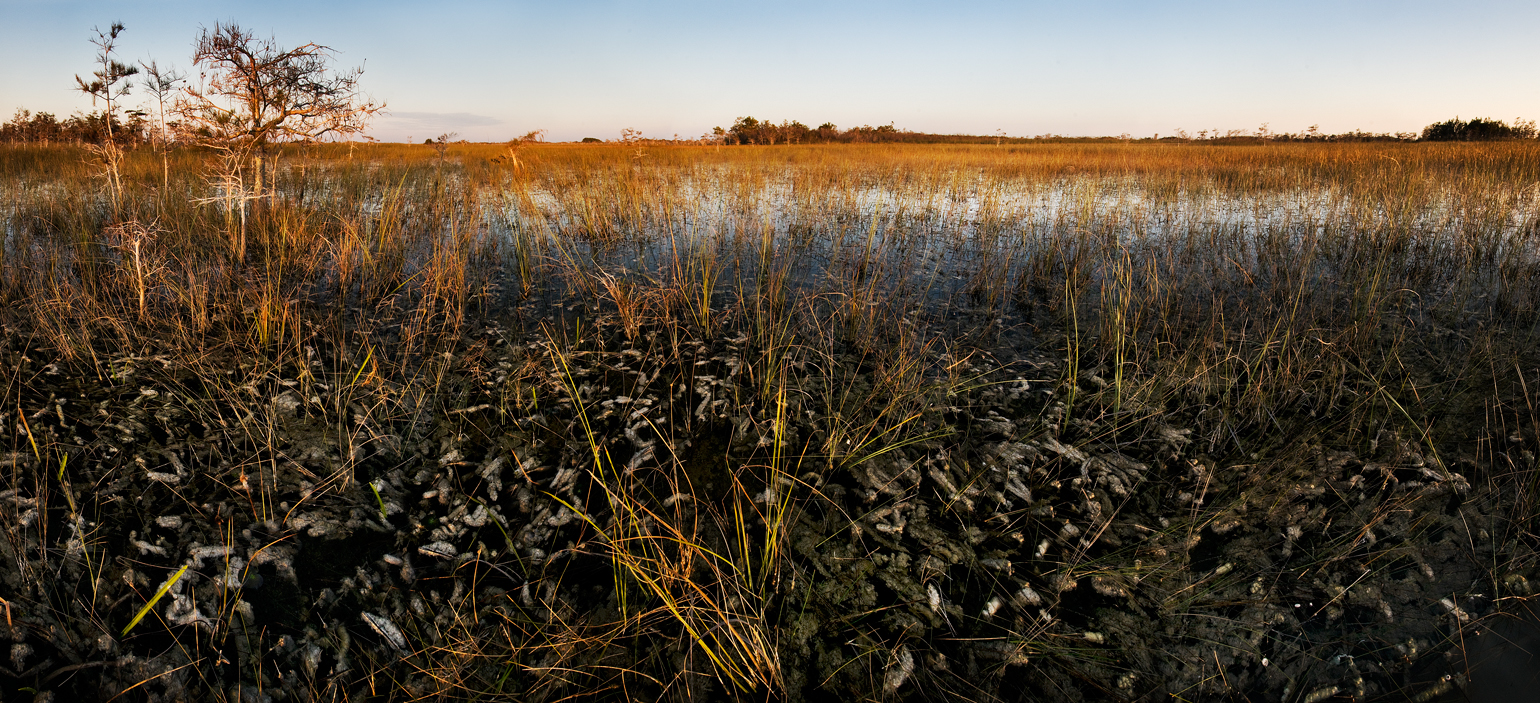
"River of Grass" in the Everglades

Douglas was a freelance writer who submitted stories to magazines throughout the 1920s, 1930s and 1940s. Her friend Hervey Allen was an editor at Rinehart, responsible for the Rivers of America Series. Allen asked her to write a story about the Miami River, but Douglas did not find it very interesting, calling it only "an inch long". She began learning more about the Miami River though, and in her research, she instead suggested to her editor to write a story about the Everglades. Douglas spent five years researching the Everglades, consulting with Garald Parker of the US Geological Survey, who was studying the Everglades hydrology systems, and eventually wrote nearly 40 papers on the ecosystems in the Everglades.

== Reception ==
The Quarterly Review of Biology reviewed the book and commented on Douglas’s "convincing evidence" in her assertion that the Everglades are a river instead of a swamp, and declared that "it is hoped that this excellent account of the area and its history may provide the needed stimulus for the establishment of an intelligent conservation program for the entire Everglades." The Journal of American Folklore praised the book highly, particularly in comparison to other books in the Rivers of America series, and likened Douglas' enthusiastic writing style to that of a previous writer on rural Florida, William Bartram: "We have a well written, readable book containing a wealth of scholarly and scientific data which can be enjoyed by both the general and the academically inclined reader." The Mississippi Valley Review also expressed interest in Douglas' idea that the Everglades is not a mere swamp.

== Editions ==
The book has gone through numerous editions, selling over 500,000 copies since its original publication. The last three editions, published by a Florida publisher, Pineapple Press, have updated afterwords: in 1998 by Randy Lee Loftis and Marjory Stoneman Douglas; the 50th anniversary edition in 1997 by Cyril Zaneski; and the 60th anniversary edition in 2007 by Michael Grunwald, author of The Swamp.
