= Everglades National Park =

National park in Florida, United States

- IUCN category II (national park)
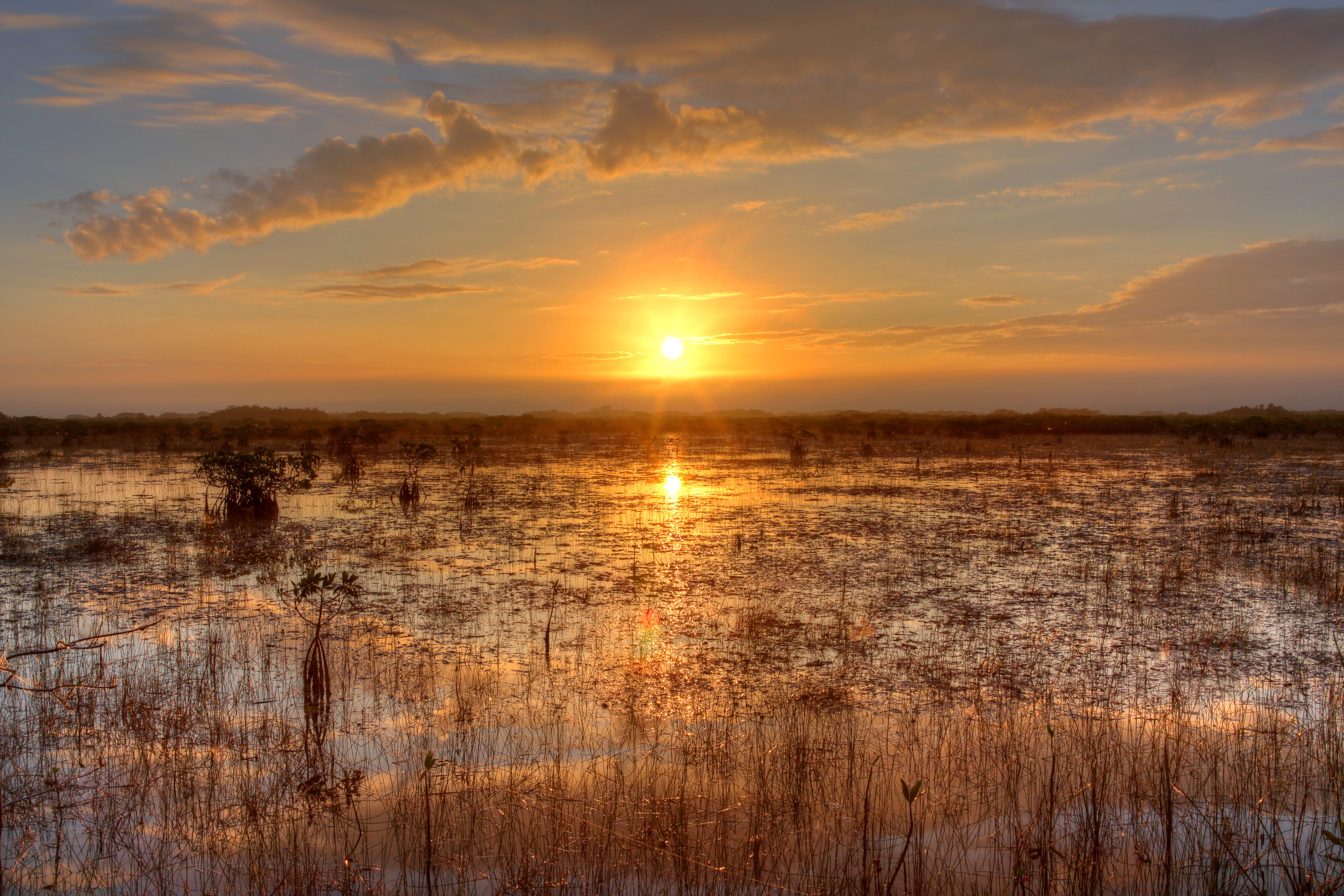
- Sunset over the Everglades river of grass, January 2013

- Location within Florida Location within the United States
- Interactive map of Everglades National Park
- Location: Miami-Dade, Monroe, & Collier counties, Florida, United States
- Nearest city: Florida City; Everglades City
- Coordinates: 25°18′45″N 80°41′15″W
- Area: 1,508,976 acres (6,106.61 km^{2}); 1,508,243 acres (2,356.6 mi^{2}) federal
- Authorized: May 30, 1934; 92 years ago
- Established: December 6, 1947
- Visitors: 1,155,193 (in 2022)
- Governing body: National Park Service
- Website: nps.gov/ever

UNESCO World Heritage Site
- Type: Natural
- Criteria: viii, ix, x
- Designated: 1979 (3rd session)
- Reference no.: 76
- Region: Europe and North America
- Endangered: 1993–2007; 2010–present

Ramsar Wetland
- Designated: 4 June 1987
- Reference no.: 374

Everglades National Park is a United States national park that protects the southern 20% of the original Everglades ecosystem in Florida. Spanning over 1.5 million acres (6,000 km^{2}), Everglades is the tenth-largest national park in the United States, the third-largest national park in the contiguous United States, and is larger than the state of Rhode Island. Over 85% of the park is designated wilderness area; the 1.3 million acre (5,250 km^{2}) Marjory Stoneman Douglas Wilderness is the largest wilderness area in the United States east of the Rocky Mountains. An average of over one million people visit the park each year. It was declared a national park in 1947. UNESCO declared the Everglades & Dry Tortugas Biosphere Reserve in 1976 and listed the park as a World Heritage Site in 1979, and the Ramsar Convention included the park on its list of Wetlands of International Importance in 1987. Everglades is one of only three locations in the world to appear on all three lists.

Most national parks preserve unique geographic features; Everglades National Park was the first created to protect a fragile ecosystem. The Everglades are a network of wetlands and forests fed by a river flowing 0.25 miles (0.40 km) per day out of Lake Okeechobee, southwest into Florida Bay. The park is the most significant breeding ground for tropical wading birds in North America and contains the largest mangrove ecosystem in the Western Hemisphere. Thirty-six threatened or protected species inhabit the park, including the Florida panther, the American crocodile, and the West Indian manatee, along with 350 species of birds, 300 species of fresh and saltwater fish, 40 species of mammals, and 50 species of reptiles. The majority of South Florida's fresh water, which is stored in the Biscayne Aquifer, is recharged in the park.

Humans have lived for thousands of years in or around the Everglades. Plans arose in 1882 to drain the wetlands and develop the land for agricultural and residential use. As the 20th century progressed, water flow from Lake Okeechobee was increasingly controlled and diverted to enable explosive growth of the Miami metropolitan area. The park was established in 1934, to protect the quickly vanishing Everglades, and dedicated in 1947, as major canal-building projects were initiated across South Florida. The ecosystems in Everglades National Park have suffered significantly from human activity, and restoration of the Everglades is a politically charged issue in South Florida.

== Geography ==
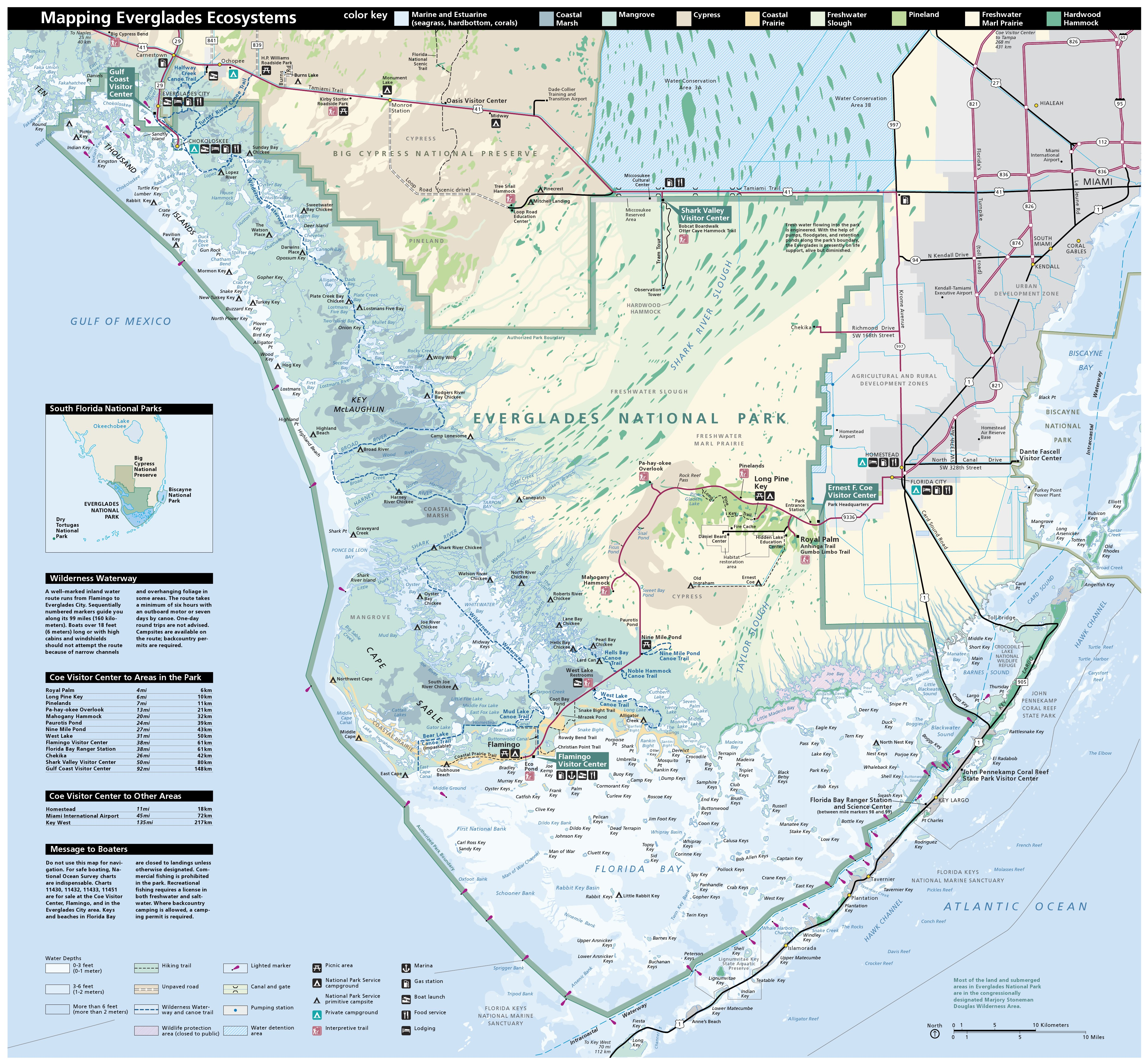
Park map

Everglades National Park covers 1,508,976 acres (2,357.8 sq mi; 6,106.6 km^{2}), throughout Dade, Monroe, and Collier counties in Florida, at the southern tip of the Atlantic coastal plain. The elevation typically ranges from 0 to 8 feet (2.4 m) above sea level, but a Calusa-built shell mound on the Gulf Coast rises 20 feet (6.1 m) above sea level.

== Geology ==
The terrain of South Florida is relatively and consistently flat. The limestone that underlies the Everglades is integral to the diverse ecosystems within the park. Florida was once part of the African portion of the supercontinent Gondwana. After it separated, conditions allowed a shallow marine environment to deposit calcium carbonate in sand, shells, and coral to be converted into limestone. Tiny bits of shell, sand, and bryozoans compressed over multiple layers forming structures in the limestone called ooids, which created permeable conditions that hold water.

The Florida peninsula appeared above sea level between 100,000 and 150,000 years ago. As sea levels rose at the end of the Wisconsin ice age, the water table appeared closer to land. Lake Okeechobee began to flood, and convection thunderstorms were created. Vast peat deposits south of Lake Okeechobee indicate that regular flooding had occurred about 5,000 years ago. Plants began to migrate, subtropical ones from the northern part of Florida, and tropicals carried as seeds by birds from islands in the Caribbean. The limestone shelf appears to be flat, but there are slight rises—called pinnacles—and depressions caused by the erosion of limestone by the acidic properties of the water. The amount of time throughout the year that water is present in a location in the Everglades determines the type of soil, of which there only two in the Everglades: peat, created by many years of decomposing plant matter, and marl, the result of dried periphyton, or chunks of algae and microorganisms that create a grayish mud. Portions of the Everglades that remain flooded for more than nine months out of the year are usually covered by peat. Areas that are flooded for six months or less are covered by marl. Plant communities are determined by the type of soil and the amount of water present.

== Climate ==
According to the Köppen climate classification system, Royal Palm at Everglades National Park has a tropical monsoon climate (Am). Summers are long, hot, and very wet and winters are warm and dry. In recent years, scientists have observed that inland freshwater sites within Everglades National Park are experiencing water-level increases that match regional sea-level rise, highlighting how vulnerable the park’s low-elevation freshwater habitats are to climate change and saltwater intrusion.

Climate data for Royal Palm Ranger Station, Florida, 1991–2020 normals, extremes 1949–present
Month	Jan	Feb	Mar	Apr	May	Jun	Jul	Aug	Sep	Oct	Nov	Dec	Year
Record high °F (°C)	92 (33)	97 (36)	101 (38)	102 (39)	107 (42)	104 (40)	102 (39)	103 (39)	105 (41)	106 (41)	99 (37)	95 (35)	107 (42)
Mean maximum °F (°C)	86.8 (30.4)	88.4 (31.3)	91.2 (32.9)	93.3 (34.1)	95.9 (35.5)	97.1 (36.2)	97.3 (36.3)	97.3 (36.3)	96.8 (36.0)	94.7 (34.8)	90.1 (32.3)	87.5 (30.8)	99.4 (37.4)
Mean daily maximum °F (°C)	78.0 (25.6)	80.9 (27.2)	83.3 (28.5)	86.4 (30.2)	89.4 (31.9)	91.1 (32.8)	92.5 (33.6)	92.6 (33.7)	91.3 (32.9)	88.0 (31.1)	83.2 (28.4)	80.0 (26.7)	86.4 (30.2)
Daily mean °F (°C)	66.6 (19.2)	68.7 (20.4)	70.7 (21.5)	74.2 (23.4)	78.0 (25.6)	81.6 (27.6)	83.0 (28.3)	83.5 (28.6)	82.8 (28.2)	79.4 (26.3)	73.5 (23.1)	69.3 (20.7)	75.9 (24.4)
Mean daily minimum °F (°C)	55.1 (12.8)	56.5 (13.6)	58.0 (14.4)	62.0 (16.7)	66.6 (19.2)	72.0 (22.2)	73.5 (23.1)	74.3 (23.5)	74.2 (23.4)	70.9 (21.6)	63.8 (17.7)	58.6 (14.8)	65.5 (18.6)
Mean minimum °F (°C)	38.9 (3.8)	41.7 (5.4)	43.7 (6.5)	50.3 (10.2)	58.0 (14.4)	67.8 (19.9)	70.3 (21.3)	71.0 (21.7)	70.8 (21.6)	61.3 (16.3)	53.1 (11.7)	44.5 (6.9)	35.8 (2.1)
Record low °F (°C)	24 (−4)	29 (−2)	31 (−1)	37 (3)	49 (9)	50 (10)	66 (19)	66 (19)	64 (18)	49 (9)	31 (−1)	27 (−3)	24 (−4)
Average precipitation inches (mm)	1.70 (43)	1.82 (46)	1.93 (49)	2.85 (72)	5.84 (148)	9.00 (229)	6.82 (173)	8.57 (218)	9.01 (229)	5.55 (141)	2.39 (61)	1.88 (48)	57.36 (1,457)
Average precipitation days (≥ 0.01 in)	6.6	6.5	6.7	6.3	10.9	17.2	17.2	19.2	18.3	12.6	7.8	6.6	135.9
Source: NOAA

== Hydrography ==
While they are common in the northern portion of Florida, no underground springs feed water into the Everglades system. An underground reservoir called the Floridan aquifer lies about 1,000 feet (300 m) below the surface of South Florida. The Everglades has an immense capacity for water storage, owing to the permeable limestone beneath the exposed land. Most of the water arrives in the form of rainfall, and a significant amount is stored in the limestone. Water evaporating from the Everglades becomes rain over metropolitan areas, providing the fresh water supply for the region. Water also flows into the park after falling as rain to the north onto the watersheds of the Kissimmee River and other sources of Lake Okeechobee, to appear in the Everglades days later. Water overflows Lake Okeechobee into a river 40 to 70 miles (64 to 113 km) wide, which moves almost imperceptibly.

== Ecosystems ==
The Everglades landscape is noted for its biodiversity. At the turn of the 20th century, common concepts of what should be protected in national parks invariably included formidable geologic features like mountains, geysers, or canyons. As Florida's population began to grow significantly and urban areas near the Everglades were developed, proponents of the park's establishment faced difficulty in persuading the federal government and the people of Florida that the subtle and constantly shifting ecosystems in the Everglades were just as worthy of protection. When the park was established in 1947, it became the first area within the U.S. to protect flora and fauna native to a region as opposed to geologic scenery. The National Park Service recognizes nine distinct interdependent ecosystems within the park that constantly shift in size owing to the amount of water present and other environmental factors.

=== Freshwater sloughs and marl prairies ===
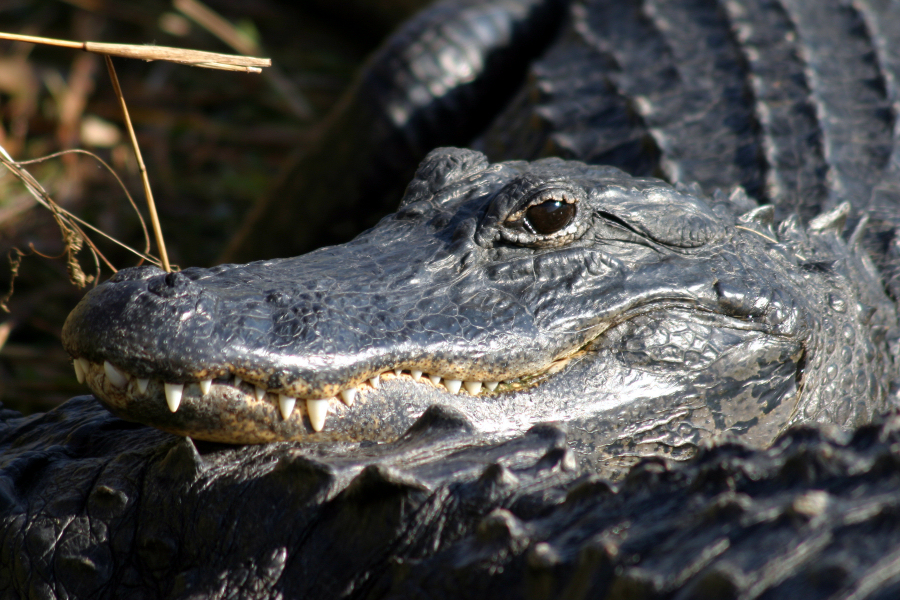
Alligators thrive in freshwater sloughs and marl prairies.

Freshwater sloughs are perhaps the most common ecosystem associated with Everglades National Park. These drainage channels are characterized by low-lying areas covered in fresh water, flowing at an almost imperceptible 100 feet (30 m) per day. These slow-moving channel-like rivers are not just features in the landscape but are central to a flow formed landscape that includes parallel ridges of higher ground. The historical broad sheet flow from Lake Okeechobee provided the consistent energy to build this ridge and slough pattern, scouring the sloughs deeper and building the peat ridges with transported sediment and organic matter. Shark River Slough and Taylor Slough are significant features of the park. Sawgrass growing to a height of 6 feet (1.8 m) or more, and broad-leafed marsh plants, are so prominent in this region that they gave the Everglades its nickname "River of Grass", cemented in the public imagination in the title for Marjory Stoneman Douglas's book (1947), which culminated years of her advocacy for considering the Everglades ecosystem as more than a "swamp". Excellent feeding locations for birds, sloughs in the Everglades attract a great variety of waders such as herons, egrets, roseate spoonbills (Platalea ajaja), ibises and brown pelicans (Pelecanus occidentalis), as well as limpkins (Aramus guarauna) and snail kites that eat apple snails, which in turn feed on the sawgrass. The sloughs' availability of fish, amphibians, and young birds attract a variety of freshwater turtles, American alligator (Alligator mississippiensis), Florida cottonmouth (Agkistrodon conanti)), and eastern diamondback rattlesnake (Crotalus adamanteus).

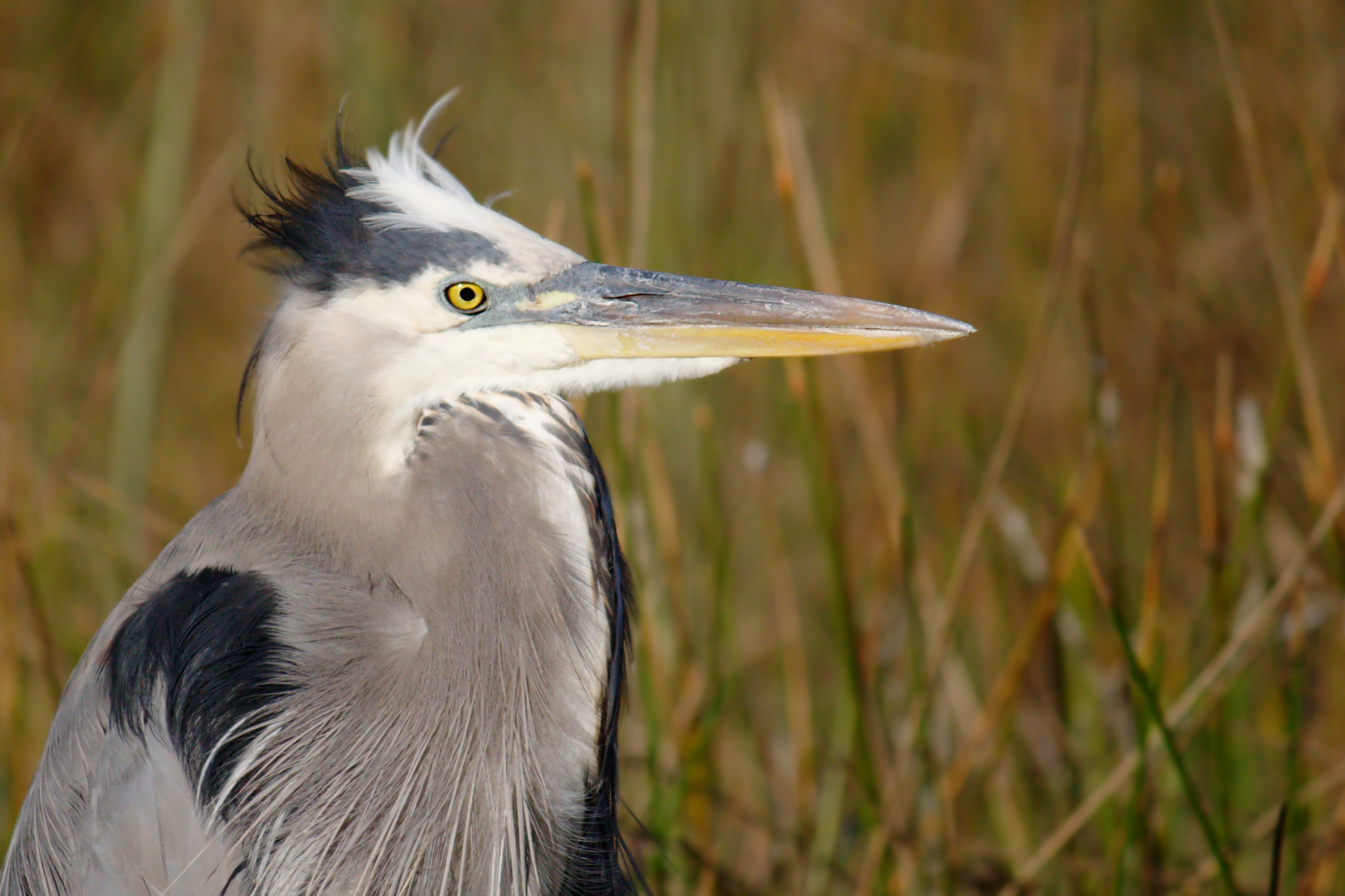
A great blue heron along the Anhinga Trail

Freshwater marl prairies are similar to sloughs but lack the slow movement of surface water; instead, water seeps through a calcitic mud called marl. Algae and other microscopic organisms form periphyton, which attaches to limestone. When it dries it turns into a gray mud. Sawgrass and other water plants grow shorter in freshwater marl than they do in peat, the other type of soil in the Everglades which is found where water remains present longer throughout the year. Marl prairies are usually under water from three to seven months of the year, whereas sloughs may remain submerged for longer than nine months and sometimes remain under water from one year to the next. Sawgrass may dominate sloughs, creating a monoculture. Other grasses, such as muhly grass (Muhlenbergia sericea) and broad-leafed water plants can be found in marl prairies. Animals living in the freshwater sloughs also inhabit marl prairies. Marl prairies may go dry in some parts of the year; alligators play a vital role in maintaining life in remote parts of the Everglades by burrowing in the mud during the dry season, creating pools of water where fish and amphibians survive from one year to the next. Alligator holes also attract other animals who congregate to feed on smaller prey. When the region floods again during the wet season, the fish and amphibians which were sustained in the alligator holes then repopulate freshwater marl prairies.

=== Tropical hardwood hammocks ===
Hammocks are often the only dry land within the park. They rise several inches above the grass-covered river and are dominated by diverse plant life consisting of subtropical and tropical trees, such as large southern live oaks (Quercus virginiana). Trees often form canopies under which animals thrive amongst scrub bushes of wild coffee (Psychotria), white indigoberry (Randia aculeata), poisonwood (Metopium toxiferum) and saw palmetto (Serenoa repens). The park features thousands of these tree islands amid sloughs—which often form the shape of a teardrop when seen from above (see park map) because of the slowly moving water around them—but they can also be found in pineland and mangroves. Trees in the Everglades, including wild tamarind (Lysiloma latisiliquum) and gumbo-limbo (Bursera simaruba), rarely grow higher than 50 feet (15 m) because of wind, fire, and climate.

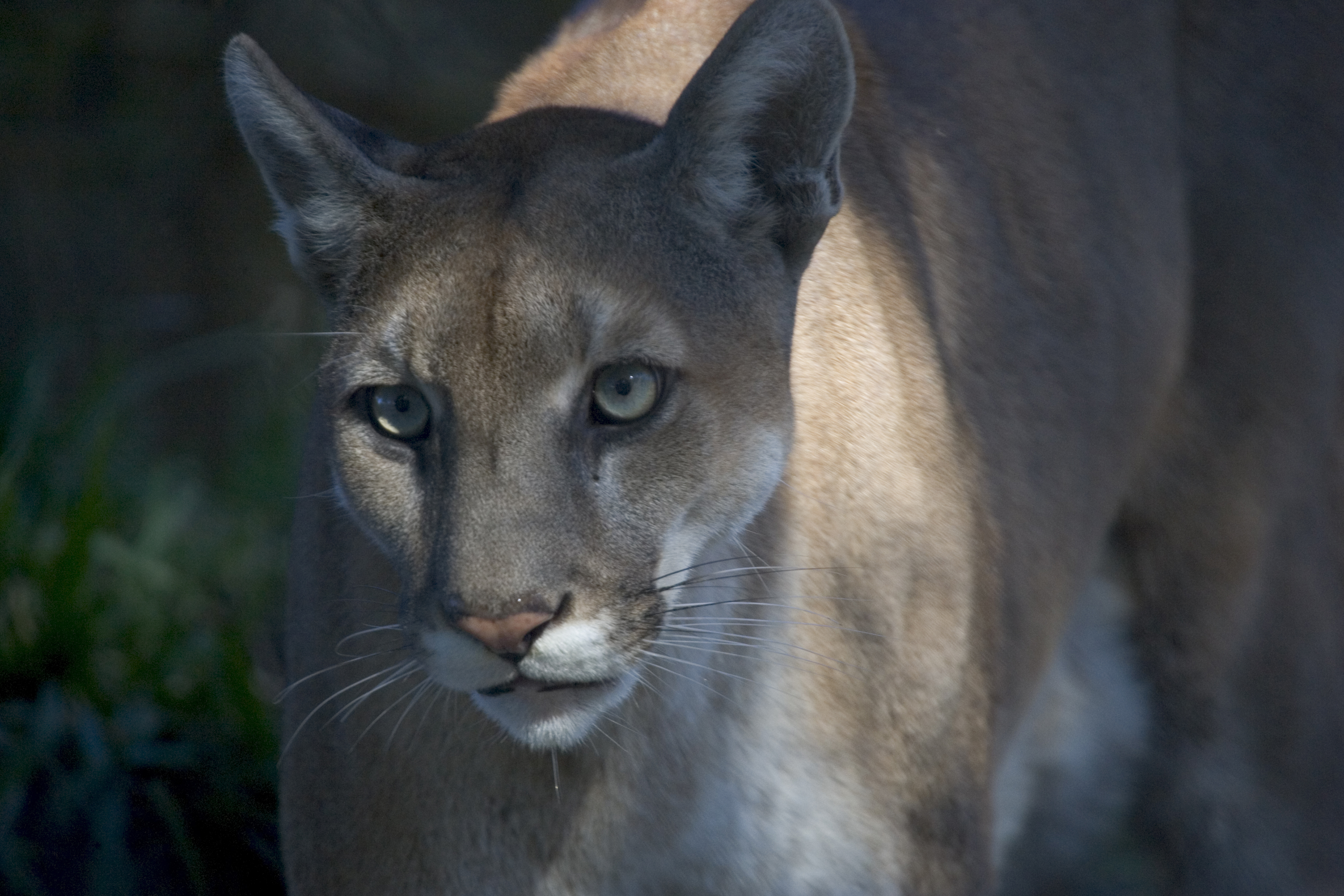
About 160 Florida panthers inhabit hammocks and pinelands of the Everglades.

The plant growth around the hammock base is nearly impenetrable; beneath the canopy hammocks is an ideal habitat for animals. Reptiles (such as various species of snake and anole) and amphibians (such as the American green tree frog, Hyla cinerea), live in the hardwood hammocks. Birds such as barred owls (Strix varia), woodpeckers, northern cardinals (Cardinalis cardinalis), and southern bald eagles (Haliaeetus leucocephalus leucocephalus) nest in hammock trees. Mammal species living in hardwood hammocks include Florida black bears (Ursus americanus floridanus), red foxes (Vulpes vulpes), minks (Neogale vison), marsh rabbits (Sylvilagus palustris), gray foxes (Urocyon cinereoargenteus), white-tailed deer (Odocoileus virginianus), and the rare, critically endangered Florida panther (Puma concolor couguar).

=== Pineland ===
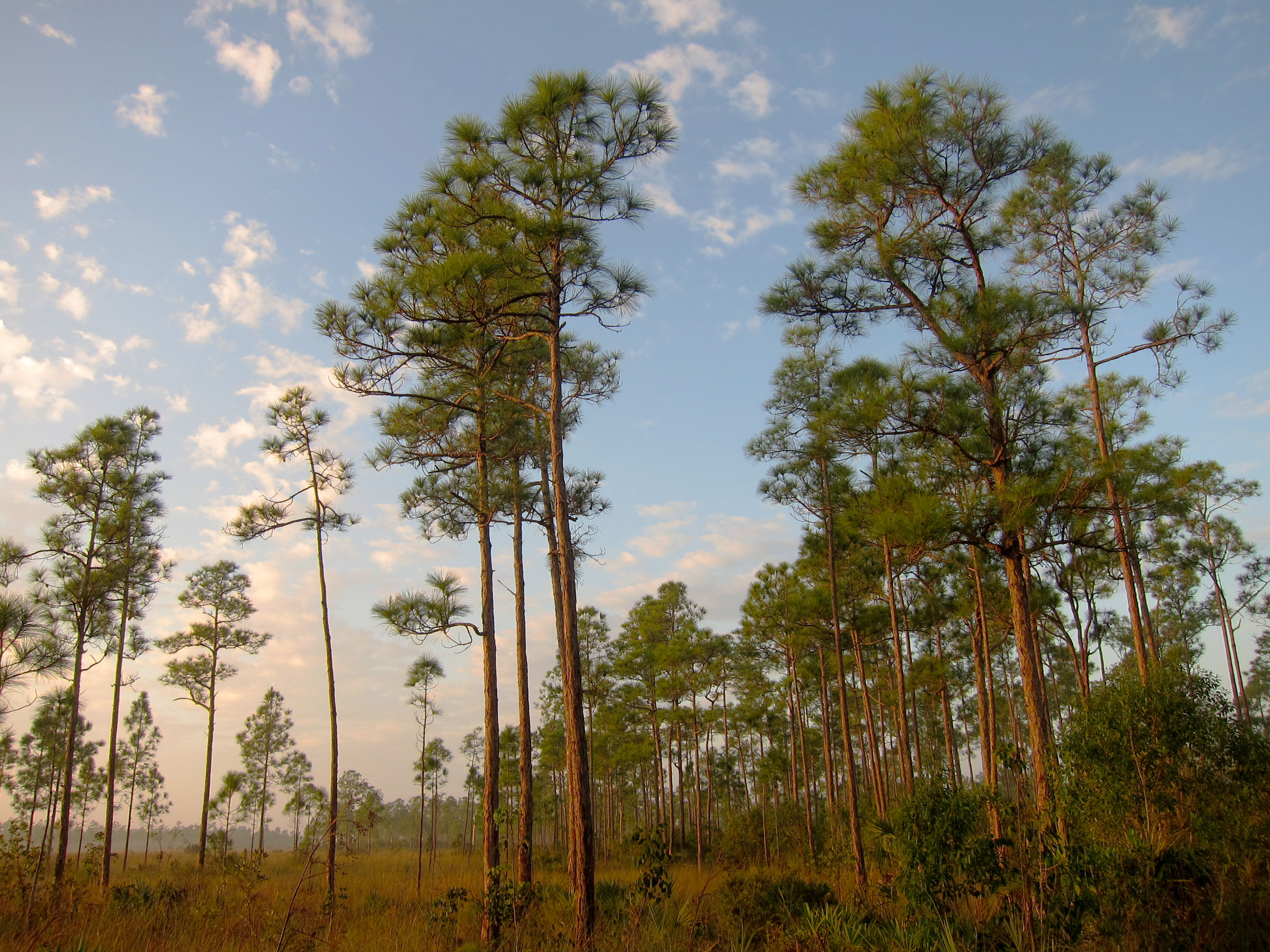
Sunrise on the pine rocklands on Long Pine Key Nature Trail

Miami-Dade County was once covered in 186,000 acres (290.6 sq mi; 752.7 km^{2}) of pine rockland forests, but most of it was harvested by the lumber industry. Pineland ecosystems (or pine rocklands) are characterized by shallow, dry sandy loam over a limestone substrate covered almost exclusively by slash pines (Pinus elliottii var. densa). Trees in this ecosystem grow in solution holes, where the soft limestone has worn away and filled with soil, allowing plants to take hold. Pinelands require regular maintenance by fire to ensure their existence. South Florida slash pines are uniquely adapted to promote fire by dropping a large amount of dried pine needles and shedding dry bark. Pine cones require heat from fires to open, allowing seeds to disperse and take hold. The trunks and roots of slash pines are resistant to fire. Prescribed burns in these areas take place every three to seven years; without regular fires, hardwood trees begin to grow in this region, and pinelands become recategorized as mixed swamp forests. Most plants in the area bloom about 16 weeks after a fire. Nearly all pinelands have an understory of palm shrubs and a diverse ground covering of wild herbs.

Pine rocklands are considered one of the most threatened habitats in Florida; less than 4,000 acres (6.3 sq mi; 16.2 km^{2}) of pineland exist outside the park. Within the park, 20,000 acres (31.3 sq mi; 80.9 km^{2}) of pineland are protected. A variety of animal species meet their needs for food, shelter, nesting, and rooking in pine rocklands. Woodpeckers, eastern meadowlarks (Sturnella magna), loggerhead shrikes (Lanius ludovicianus), grackles, and northern mockingbirds (Mimus polyglottos) are commonly found in pinelands. Black bears and Florida panthers also live in this habitat.

=== Cypress and mangrove ===
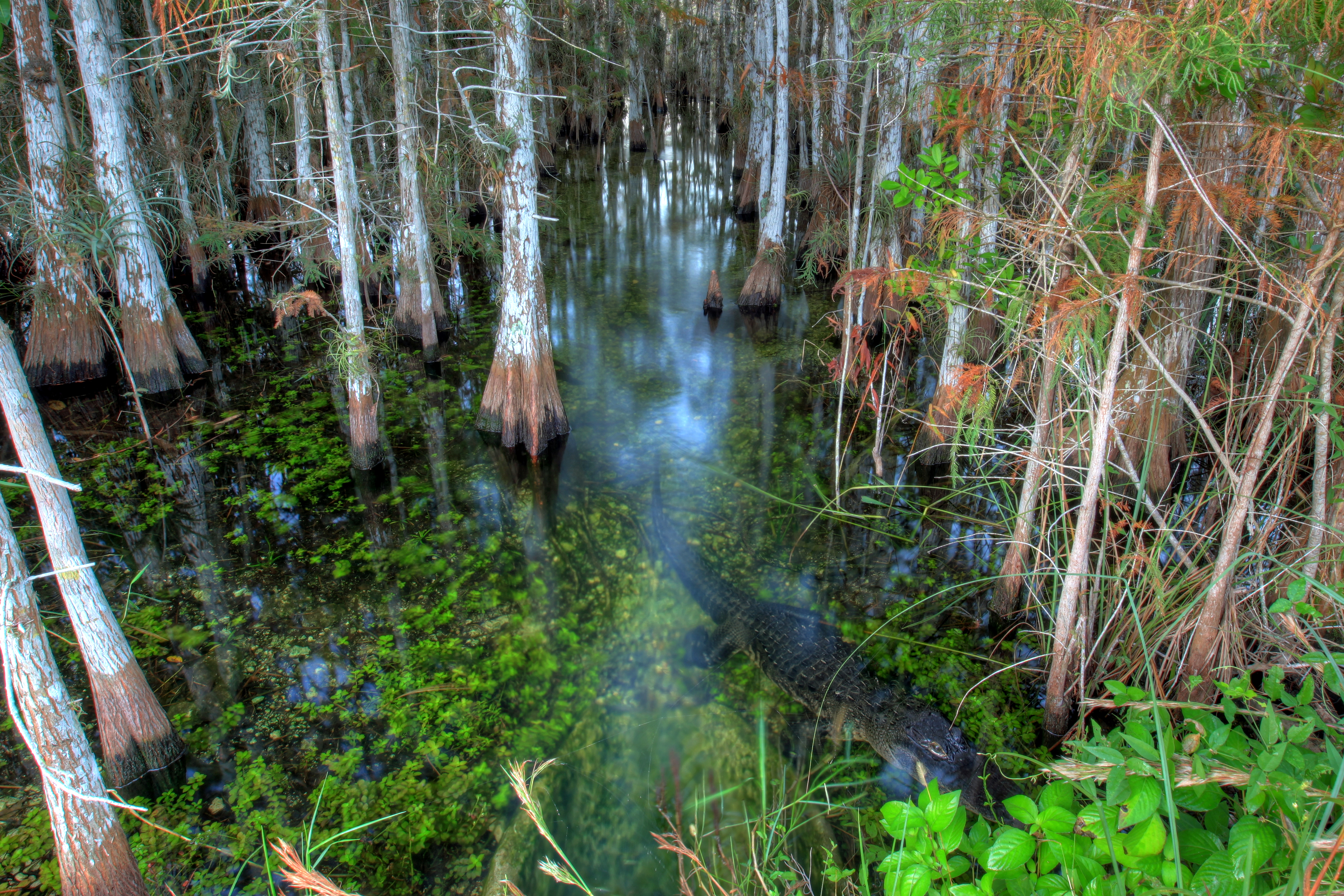
Alligator in a cypress dome

Cypress trees are conifers that are adapted to live in standing fresh water. They grow in compact structures called cypress domes and in long strands over limestone. Water levels may fluctuate dramatically around cypress domes and strands, so cypresses develop "knees" that protrude from the water at high levels to provide oxygen for the root systems. Dwarf cypress trees grow in drier areas with poorer soil. Epiphytes, such as bromeliads, Spanish moss (Tillandsia usneoides), orchids and ferns grow on the branches and trunks of cypress trees. Everglades National Park features twenty-five species of orchids. Tall cypress trees provide excellent nesting areas for birds including wild turkey (Meleagris gallopavo), ibis, herons, egrets, anhingas (Anhinga anhinga), and belted kingfisher (Megaceryle alcyon). Mammals in cypress regions include white-tailed deer, squirrels, raccoons, opossums, skunks, swamp rabbits, river otters (Lontra canadensis), and bobcats, as well as small rodents.

Mangrove trees cover the coastlines of South Florida, sometimes growing inland depending on the amount of salt water present within the Everglades ecosystems. During drier years when less fresh water flows to the coast, mangroves will appear among fresh water plants. When rain is abundant, sawgrass and other fresh water plants may be found closer to the coast. Three species of mangrove trees—red (Rhizophora mangle), black (Avicennia germinans), and white (Laguncularia racemosa)—can be found in the Everglades. With a high tolerance of salt water, winds, extreme tides, high temperatures, and muddy soils, mangrove trees are uniquely adapted to extreme conditions. They act as nurseries for many marine and bird species. They are also Florida's first defense against the destructive forces of hurricanes, absorbing flood waters and preventing coastal erosion. The mangrove system in Everglades National Park is the largest continuous system of mangroves in the world.

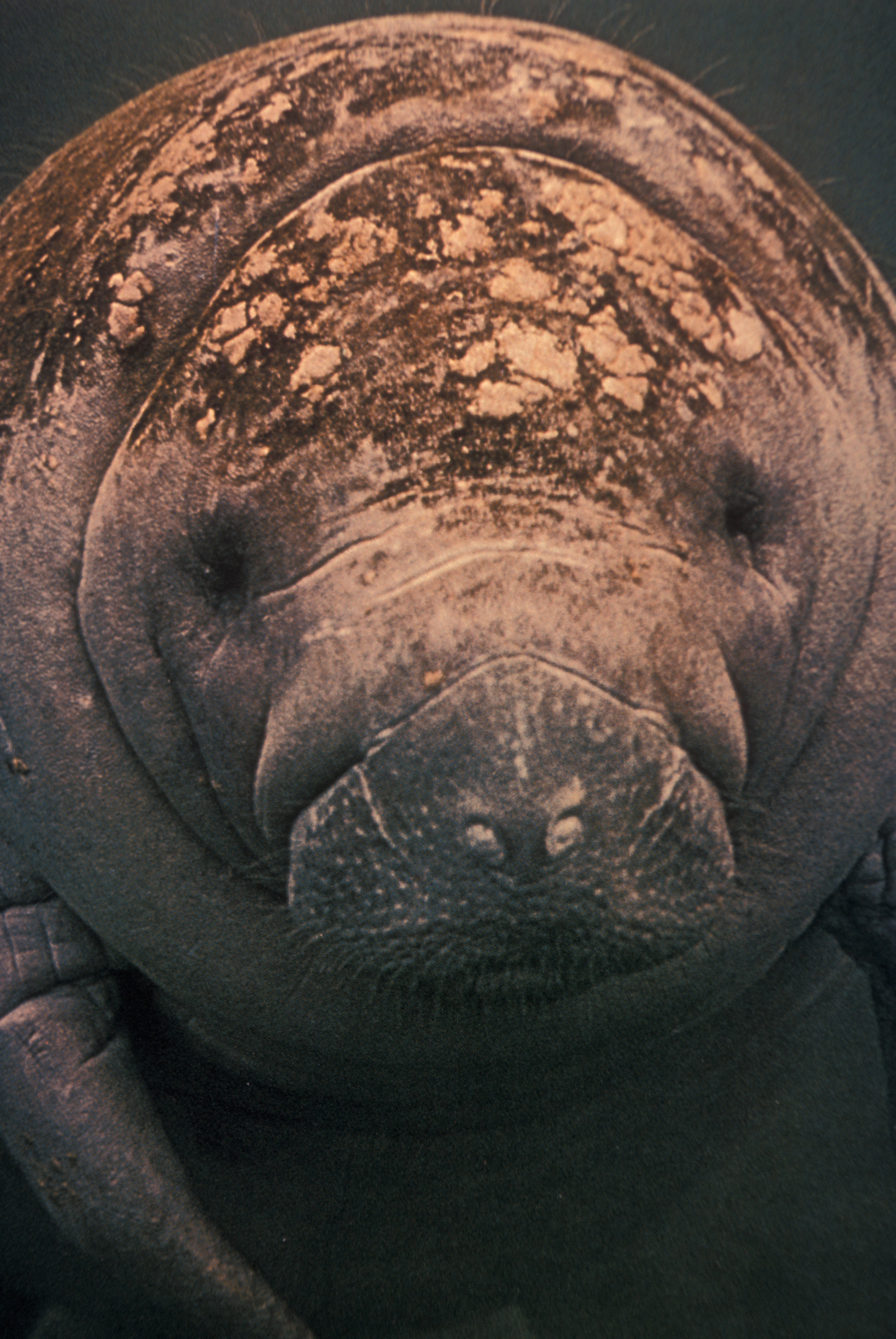
Manatees inhabit shallow water around mangroves.

Within the Florida mangrove systems live 220 species of fish, and a variety of crabs, crayfish, shrimp, mollusks, and other invertebrates, which serve as the main source of food for many birds. Dozens of bird species use mangroves as nurseries and food stores, including pelicans, grebes, tricolored herons (Egretta tricolor), gulls, terns, hawks and kites, and arboreal birds like mangrove cuckoos (Coccyzus minor), yellow warblers (Dendroica petechia), and white-crowned pigeons (Patagioenas leucocephala). The mangroves also support 24 species of amphibians and reptiles, and 18 species of mammals, including the endangered green turtle (Chelonia mydas), hawksbill sea turtle (Eretmochelys imbricata), and West Indian manatee (Trichechus manatus).

=== Coastal lowlands ===
Coastal lowlands, or wet prairies, are salt water marshes that absorb marine water when it gets high or fresh water when rains are heavy. Floods occur during hurricane and tropical storm surges when ocean water can rise several feet over the land. Heavy wet seasons also cause floods when rain from the north flows into the Everglades. Few trees can survive in the conditions of this region, but plants—succulents like saltwort and glasswort—tolerate salt, brackish water, and desert conditions. Animal life in this zone is dependent upon the amount of water present, but commonly found animals include Cape Sable seaside sparrow (Ammodramus maritimus mirabilis), Everglades snail kite (Rostrhamus sociabilis), wood stork (Mycteria americana), eastern indigo snake (Drymarchon couperi), and small mammals such as rats, mice, and rabbits.

=== Marine and estuarine ===
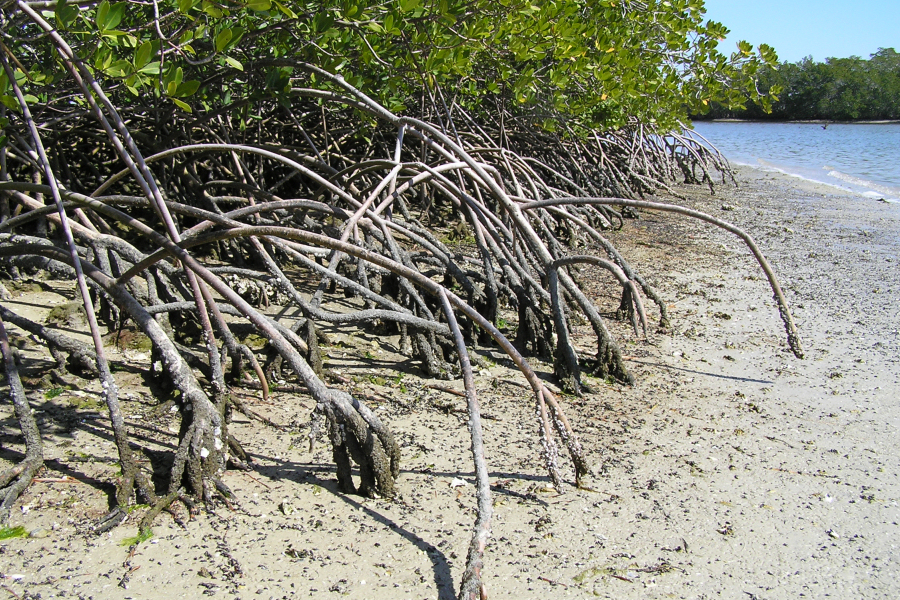
Mangroves reduce coastal erosion and shelter wildlife.

The largest body of water within the park is Florida Bay, which extends from the mangrove swamps of the mainland's southern tip to the Florida Keys. Over 800 square miles (2,100 km^{2}) of marine ecosystem lies in this range. Coral, sponges, and seagrasses serve as shelter and food for crustaceans and mollusks, which in turn are the primary food source for larger marine animals. Sharks, stingrays, and barracudas also live in this ecosystem. Pelicans, shorebirds, terns, and black skimmers (Rynchops niger) are among the birds frequenting park shorelines. The bay also has its own resident population of bottlenose dolphin (Tursiops truncatus). Seagrass meadows in Florida Bay and estuaries that are close by, are very important in the environment. They are there to stabilize sediments, support fisheries, and act as some sort of a buffer for coastal habitats against disturbance. Recent research shows us that these seagrass communities can be quite resilient but are vulnerable whenever there are rule changes that make them exposed to a variety of different stressors. These stressors can be things like warming waters along with altered salinity and the constant declining water quality. The study mentions that freshwater inflows from the Everglades is a strong influence on patterns of salinity, which means that changes in upstream water management can be the determining factor as to whether seagrass meadows persist or collapse .

The bay's many basins are broken up by sandbanks that serve as plentiful recreational fishing grounds for snook (Centropomus undecimalis), redfish (Sciaenops ocellatus), spotted seatrout (Cynoscion nebulosus), tarpon (Megaflops atlanticus), bonefish (Albula vulpes), and permit (Trichinous falcatus), as well as snapper (Lutjanus campechanus), bluegill (Lepomis macrochirus), and bass. Wading birds such as roseate spoonbills (Platalea ajaja), reddish egrets (Egretta rufescens), and great white herons (Ardea herodias occidentalis) have unique subpopulations that are largely restricted to Florida Bay. Other bird species include bald eagles, cormorants, and ospreys. Mammals along the shoreline include raccoons, opossums, bobcats, and fox squirrels.

== Human history ==
=== Native peoples ===
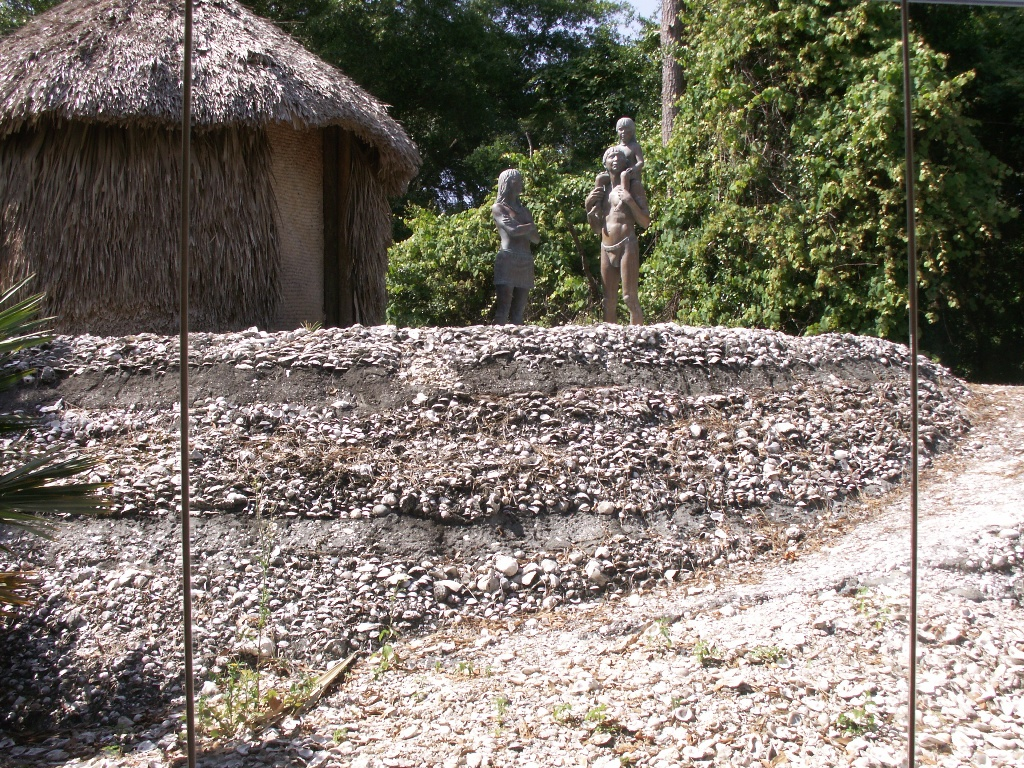
A Calusa chickee at the Florida Museum of Natural History

Humans likely first inhabited the South Florida region 10,000 to 20,000 years ago. Two tribes of Native Americans developed on the peninsula's southern tip: the Tequesta lived on the eastern side and the Calusa, greater in numbers, on the western side. The Everglades served as a natural boundary between them. The Tequesta lived in a single large community near the mouth of the Miami River, while the Calusa lived in 30 villages. Both groups traveled through the Everglades but rarely lived within them, remaining mostly along the coast.

The diets of both groups consisted mostly of shellfish and fish, small mammals, game, and wild plants. Having access only to soft limestone, most of the tools fashioned by Native Americans in the region were made of shell, bone, wood, and animal teeth; shark teeth were used as cutting blades, and sharpened reeds became arrows and spears. Shell mounds still exist today within the park, giving archaeologists and anthropologists evidence of the raw materials available to the indigenous people for tool construction. Spanish explorers estimated the number of Tequesta at first contact to be around 800, and Calusa at 2,000; the National Park Service reports there were probably about 20,000 natives living in or near the Everglades when the Spanish established contact in the late 16th century. The Calusa lived in social strata and were able to create canals, earthworks, and shellworks. The Calusa were also able to resist Spanish attempts at conquest.

The Spanish had contact with these societies and established missions further north, near Lake Okeechobee. In the 18th century, invading Creeks incorporated the dwindling numbers of the Tequesta into their own. Neither the Tequesta nor Calusa tribe existed by 1800. Disease, warfare, and capture for slavery were the reasons for the eradication of both groups. The only evidence of their existence within the park boundaries is a series of shell mounds that were built by the Calusa.

In the first half of the 19th century, people called Spanish Indians and Muspas by white Americans lived in southern Florida. At the same time Creeks, escaped African slaves, and other Indians from northern Florida displaced by the Creek War, formed the area's Seminole nation. After the end of the Seminole Wars in 1842, the Seminoles faced relocation to Indian Territory near Oklahoma. A few hundred Seminole hunters and scouts settled within what is today Big Cypress National Preserve, to escape the forced emigration to the west. Some survivors of the Spanish Indians were sent to Indian Territory with the Seminoles. From 1859 to about 1930, the Seminoles and Miccosukee lived in relative isolation, making their living by trading. In 1928, surveying and construction began on the Tamiami Trail, along the northern border of Everglades National Park. The road bisected the Everglades, introducing a steady, if small, traffic of white settlers into the Everglades.

Some members of the Miccosukee and Seminole tribes continue to live within park boundaries. Management of the park includes approval of new policies and procedures by tribal representatives "in such a manner that they do not conflict with the park purpose".

=== American settlements ===
Following the end of the Seminole Wars, Americans began settling at isolated points along the coast in what is now the park, from the Ten Thousand Islands to Cape Sable. Communities developed on the two largest pieces of dry ground in the area, on Chokoloskee Island and at Flamingo on Cape Sable, both of which established post offices in the early 1890s. Chokoloskee Island is a shell mound, a midden built roughly 20 feet (6 m) high over thousands of years of occupation by the Calusa. The settlements in Chokoloskee and Flamingo served as trading centers for small populations of farmers, fishermen, and charcoal burners settled in the Ten Thousand Islands. Both settlements and the more isolated homesteads could only be reached by boat until well into the 20th century. Everglades City, on the mainland near Chokoloskee, enjoyed a brief period of prosperity when, beginning in 1920, it served as the headquarters for the construction of the Tamiami Trail. A dirt road from Florida City reached Flamingo in 1922, while a causeway finally connected Chokoloskee to the mainland's Everglades City in 1956.

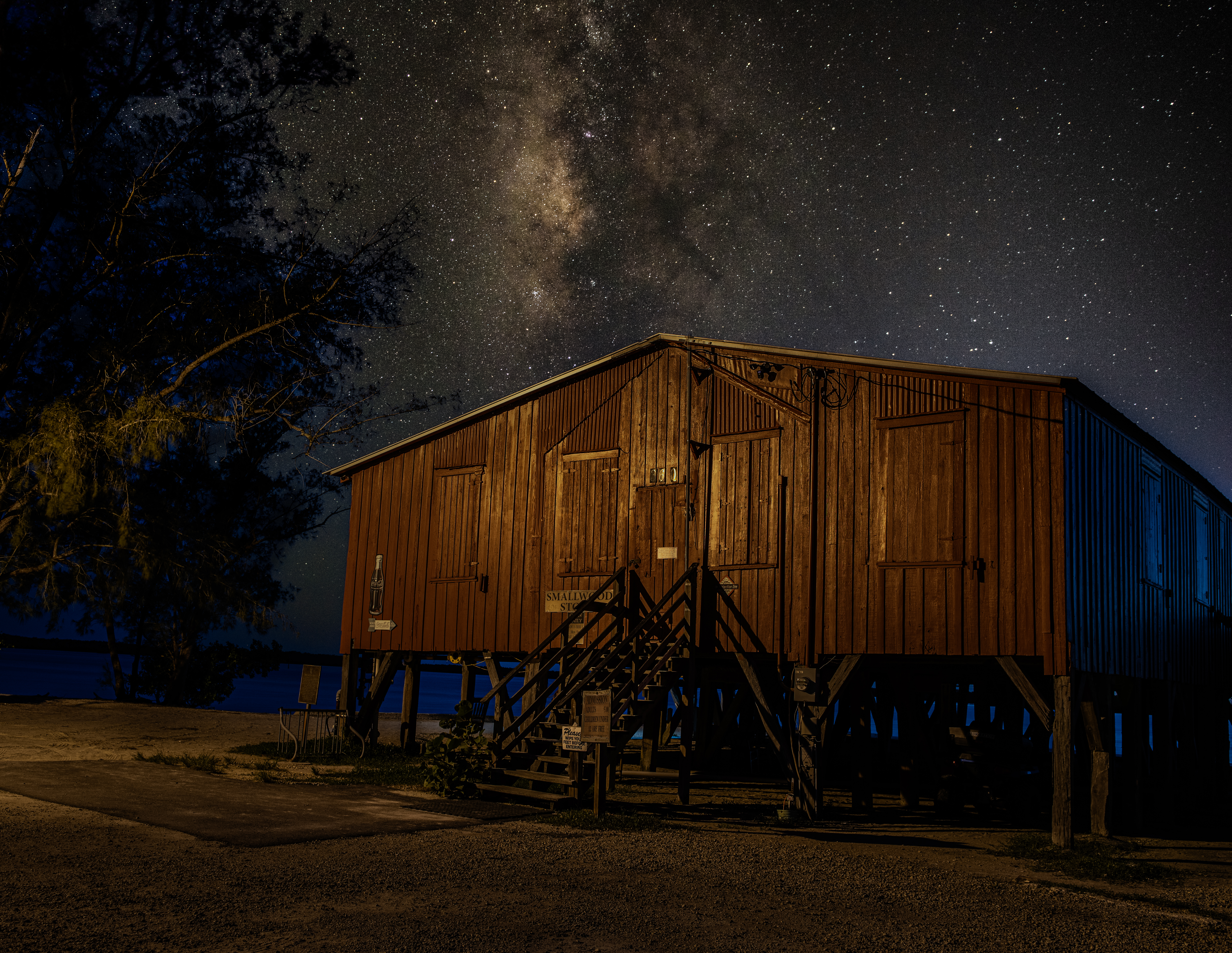
Ted Smallwood Store on Chokoloskee Island

After the park was established, private property in the Flamingo area was claimed by eminent domain, and the site was incorporated into the park as a visitor center.

=== Land development and conservation ===
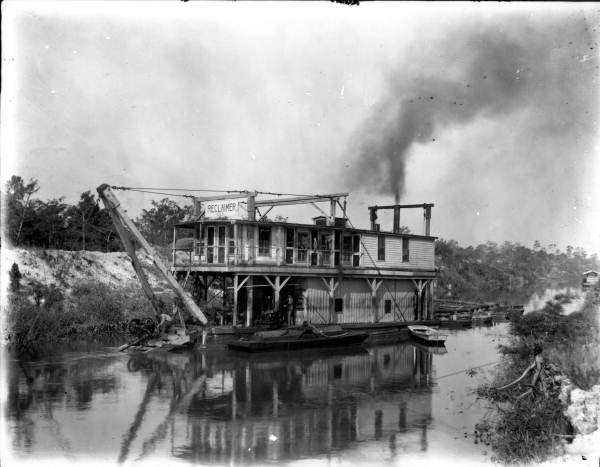
A canal lock being constructed in the Everglades in 1906

Several attempts were made to drain and develop the Everglades in the 1880s. The first canals built in the Everglades did little harm to the ecosystem, as they were unable to drain much of it. Napoleon Bonaparte Broward based the majority of his 1904 campaign for governor on how drainage would create "The Empire of the Everglades". Broward ordered the drainage that took place between 1905 and 1910, and it was successful enough that land developers sold tracts for $30 per acre, settling the town of Davie, and developing regions in Lee and Dade counties. The canals also cleared water that made way for agricultural fields growing sugarcane.

In the 1920s, a population boom in South Florida created the Florida land boom, which was described by author Michael Grunwald as "insanity". Land was sold before any homes or structures were built on it and in some cases before any plans for construction were in place. New landowners, eager to make good on their investments, hastily constructed homes and small towns on recently drained land. Mangrove trees on the coasts were taken down for better views and replaced with shallow-rooted palm trees. The U.S. Army Corps of Engineers began construction on larger canals to control the rising waters in the Everglades. Nevertheless, Lake Okeechobee continued to rise and fall, the region was covered with rain, and city planners continued to battle the water. The 1926 Miami Hurricane caused Lake Okeechobee levees to fail; hundreds of people south of the lake drowned. Two years later, the 1928 Okeechobee Hurricane claimed 2,500 lives when Lake Okeechobee once again surged over its levees. Politicians who declared the Everglades uninhabitable were silenced when a four-story wall, the Herbert Hoover Dike, was built around Lake Okeechobee. This wall effectively cut off the water source from the Everglades.

Following the wall's construction, South Florida endured a drought severe enough to cause serious wildfires in 1939. The influx of humans had a detrimental effect on the plants and animals of the region when melaleuca trees (Melaleuca quinquenervia) were introduced to help with drainage, along with Australian pines brought in by developers as windbreaks. The region's timber was devastated for lumber supplies. Alligators, birds, frogs, and fish were hunted on a large scale. Entire rookeries of wading birds were shot to collect their plumes, which were used in women's hats in the early 20th century. The largest impact people had on the region was the diversion of water away from the Everglades. Canals were deepened and widened, and water levels fell dramatically, causing chaos in food webs. Salt water replaced fresh water in the canals, and by 1997 scientists noticed that salt water was seeping into the Biscayne Aquifer, South Florida's water source.

In the 1940s, Marjory Stoneman Douglas, a freelance writer and former reporter for The Miami Herald, began to research the Everglades for an assignment about the Miami River. She studied the land and water for five years and published The Everglades: River of Grass in 1947, describing the area in great detail, including a chapter on its disappearance. She wrote: "What had been a river of grass and sweet water that had given meaning and life and uniqueness to this enormous geography through centuries in which man had no place here was made, in one chaotic gesture of greed and ignorance and folly, a river of fire." The book has sold 500,000 copies since its publication, and Douglas's continued dedication to ecology conservation earned her the nicknames "Grand Dame of the Everglades", "Grandmother of the Everglades" and "the anti-Christ" for her singular focus at the expense of some political interests. She founded and served as president for an organization called Friends of the Everglades, initially intended to protest the construction of a proposed Big Cypress jetport in 1968. Successful in that confrontation, the organization has grown to over 4,000 members, committed to the preservation of the Everglades. She wrote and spoke about the importance of the Everglades until her death at age 108 in 1998.

== Park history ==
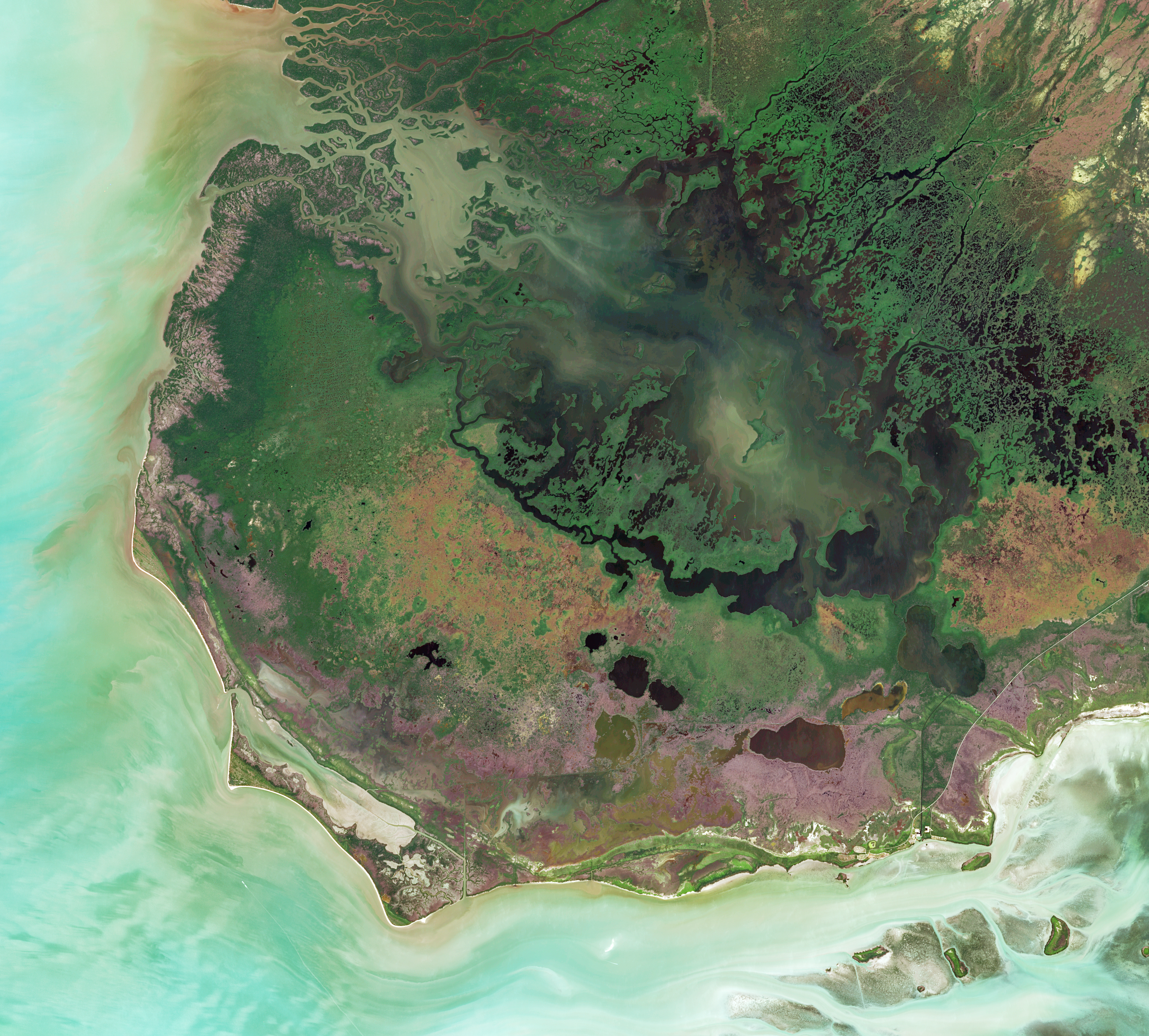
Cape Sable seen from Sentinel-2 Satellite

Floridians hoping to preserve at least part of the Everglades began to express their concern over diminishing resources in the early 20th century. Royal Palm State Park was created in 1916 and protected Paradise Key; it included several trails and a visitor center several miles from Homestead. Miami-based naturalists first proposed that the area become a national park in 1923. Five years later, the Florida state legislature established the Tropical Everglades National Park Commission to study the formation of a protected area. The commission was led by Ernest F. Coe, a land developer turned conservationist, who was eventually nicknamed Father of Everglades National Park. Coe's original plan for the park included more than 2,000,000 acres (3,125.0 sq mi; 8,093.7 km^{2}) including Key Largo and Big Cypress, and his unwillingness to compromise almost prevented the park's creation. Various other interests, including land developers and sport hunters, demanded that the size of the park be decreased.

The commission was also tasked with proposing a method to raise the money to purchase the land. The search coincided with the arrival of the Great Depression in the United States, and money for land purchase was scarce. The U.S. House of Representatives authorized the creation of the new national park on May 30, 1934, but the Act (HR 2837), which permanently reserved lands donated by public or private donation as wilderness, passed only with a rider that ensured no money would be allotted to the project for at least five years. Coe's passion and U.S. Senator Spessard Holland's politicking helped to fully establish the park, after Holland was able to negotiate 1,300,000 acres (2,031.2 sq mi; 5,260.9 km^{2}) of the park, leaving out Big Cypress, Key Largo, the Turner River area, and a 22,000-acre (34.4 sq mi; 89.0 km^{2}) tract of land called "The Hole in the Donut" that was too highly valued for agriculture. Miami Herald editor John Pennekamp was instrumental in pushing the Florida Legislature to raise $2 million to purchase the private land inside the park boundaries. It was dedicated by President Harry Truman on December 6, 1947, one month after Marjory Stoneman Douglas's book The Everglades: River of Grass was released. The same year, several tropical storms struck South Florida, prompting the construction of 1,400 miles (2,300 km) of canals, sending water unwanted by farmers and residents to the ocean.

The park protects the last stands of pine rockland in Florida.

The Central and Southern Florida Flood Control Project (C&SF) was authorized by Congress to construct more than one thousand miles of canals and flood control structures across South Florida. The C&SF, run by the U.S. Army Corps of Engineers, established an agricultural area directly south of Lake Okeechobee, and three water conservation areas, all bordered by canals that diverted excess water either to urban areas or into the Atlantic Ocean, Gulf of Mexico or Florida Bay. South of these manmade regions was Everglades National Park, which had been effectively cut off from its water supply. By the 1960s, the park was visibly suffering. The C&SF was directed to provide enough water to sustain the park; it did not follow through. The 1968 proposal for the Big Cypress Jetport became a pivotal environmental battleground ultimately leading to the project's cancellation and the formal integration of ecological preservation into American political policy. In 1972, a bill was introduced to curb development in South Florida and ensure the national park would receive the amount of water it needed. Efforts turned to repairing the damage wrought by decades of mismanagement: the Army Corps of Engineers changed its focus in 1990 from constructing dams and canals to constructing "purely environmental projects".

Regions originally included in Ernest Coe's vision for a national park were slowly added over the years to the park or incorporated into other protected areas: Biscayne National Park, Big Cypress National Preserve, John Pennekamp Coral Reef State Park on Key Largo, Ten Thousand Islands National Wildlife Refuge, and Florida Keys National Marine Sanctuary were all protected after the park's opening in 1947. Everglades National Park was designated an International Biosphere Reserve on October 26, 1976. On November 10, 1978, 1,296,500 acres (2,025.8 sq mi; 5,246.7 km^{2}), about 86% of the park, was declared a wilderness area. It was renamed the Marjory Stoneman Douglas Wilderness in 1997. It was listed as a UNESCO World Heritage Site on October 24, 1979, and as a Wetland of International Importance on June 4, 1987. It was placed on the List of World Heritage in Danger from 1993 until 2007 and then again in 2010. The park was added again due to the continued degradation of the set causing significant indications of eutrophication (for example algal blooms) negatively impacting the marine life causing the US government to request UNESCO and IUCN for assistance in development.

=== Restoration efforts ===
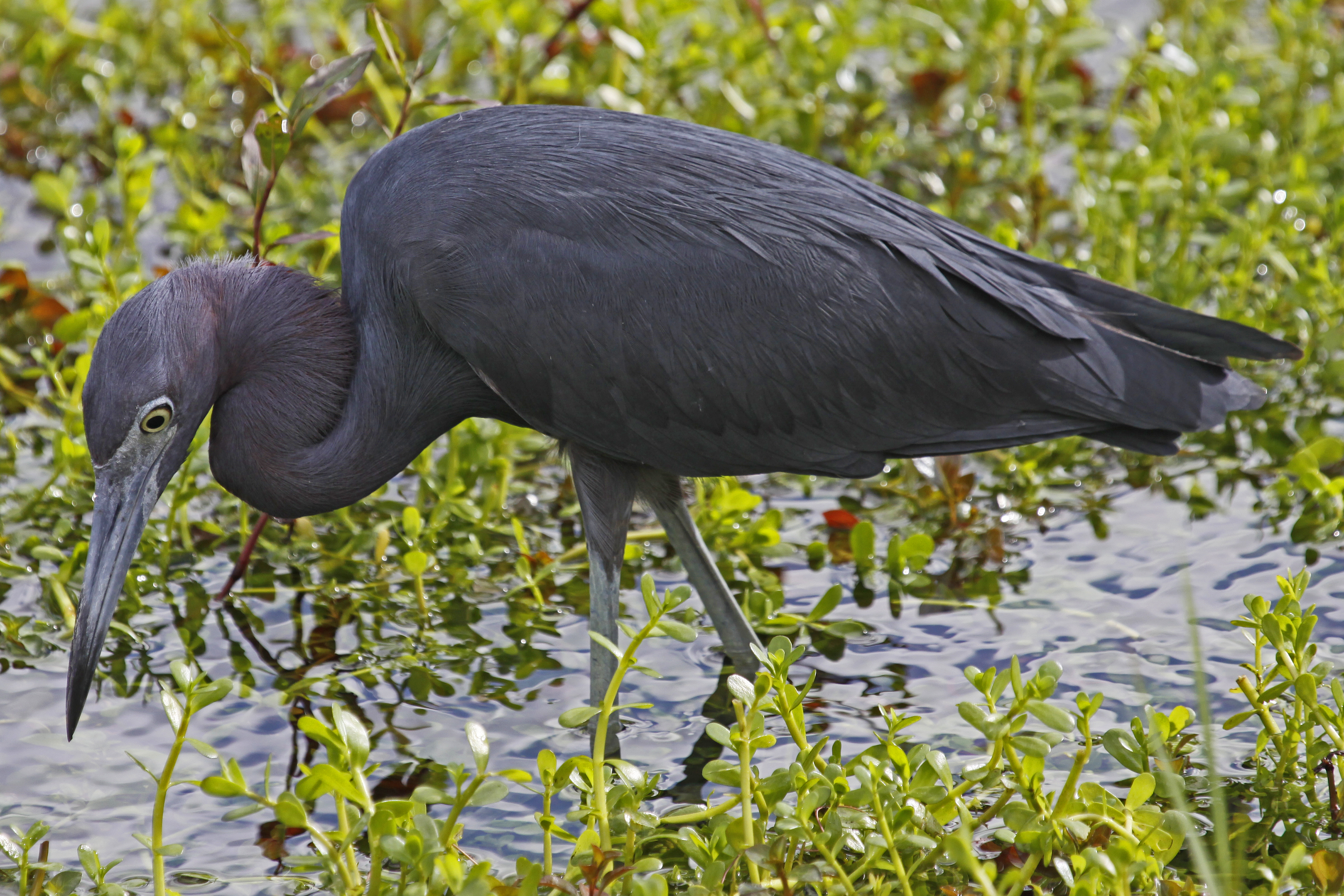
A little blue heron hunting in water near the Anhinga Trail

President George H. W. Bush signed the Everglades National Park Protection and Expansion Act on December 13, 1989, that added 109,506 acres (171.1 sq mi; 443.2 km^{2}) to the eastern side of the park, closed the park to airboats, directed the Department of the Army to restore water to improve the ecosystems within Everglades National Park, and "Direct(ed) the Secretary of the Interior to manage the Park in order to maintain the natural abundance, diversity, and ecological integrity of native plants and animals, as well as the behavior of native animals, as part of their ecosystem." Bush remarked in his statement when signing the act, "Through this legislation that river of grass may now be restored to its natural flow of water".

In 2000, Congress approved the Comprehensive Everglades Restoration Plan (CERP), a federal effort to restore the Everglades with the objectives of "restoration, preservation and protection of the south Florida ecosystem while providing for other water-related needs of the region", and claiming to be the largest environmental restoration in history. However, the implementation of CERP has revealed the complex interplay of science, policy, and politics in Everglades management. The plan's execution is consistently challenged by competing interests among federal and state agencies, agricultural stakeholders, urban developers, and environmental groups. It was a controversial plan; detractors worried that it "relies on uncertain technologies, overlooks water quality, subsidizes damaging growth and delays its environmental benefits". Supporters of the plan included the National Audubon Society, who were accused by Friends of the Everglades and the Biodiversity Legal Foundation of prioritizing agricultural and business interests. The economic imperative for restoration is a key driver of CERP. The plan is designed to rectify the water management practices that have harmed the park's ecosystems. A primary example is the protection of fisheries. The multimillion-dollar recreational fishing industry in areas like Florida Bay is entirely dependent on the salinity levels maintained by natural freshwater flow. Hydrologic restoration projects in the western Everglades are starting to show some drastic effects on water quality. There is an analysis that used the Watershed Assessment Model (WAM), and it found that adjustments to managed flows can actually reduce nutrient concentrations in some areas, while shifting them in others. This shows that there is a need for us to think about restoration design together with water-quality goals. The study shows that restoration is about restoring historical hydrology all whilst managing trade-offs in nutrient dynamics across the landscape.

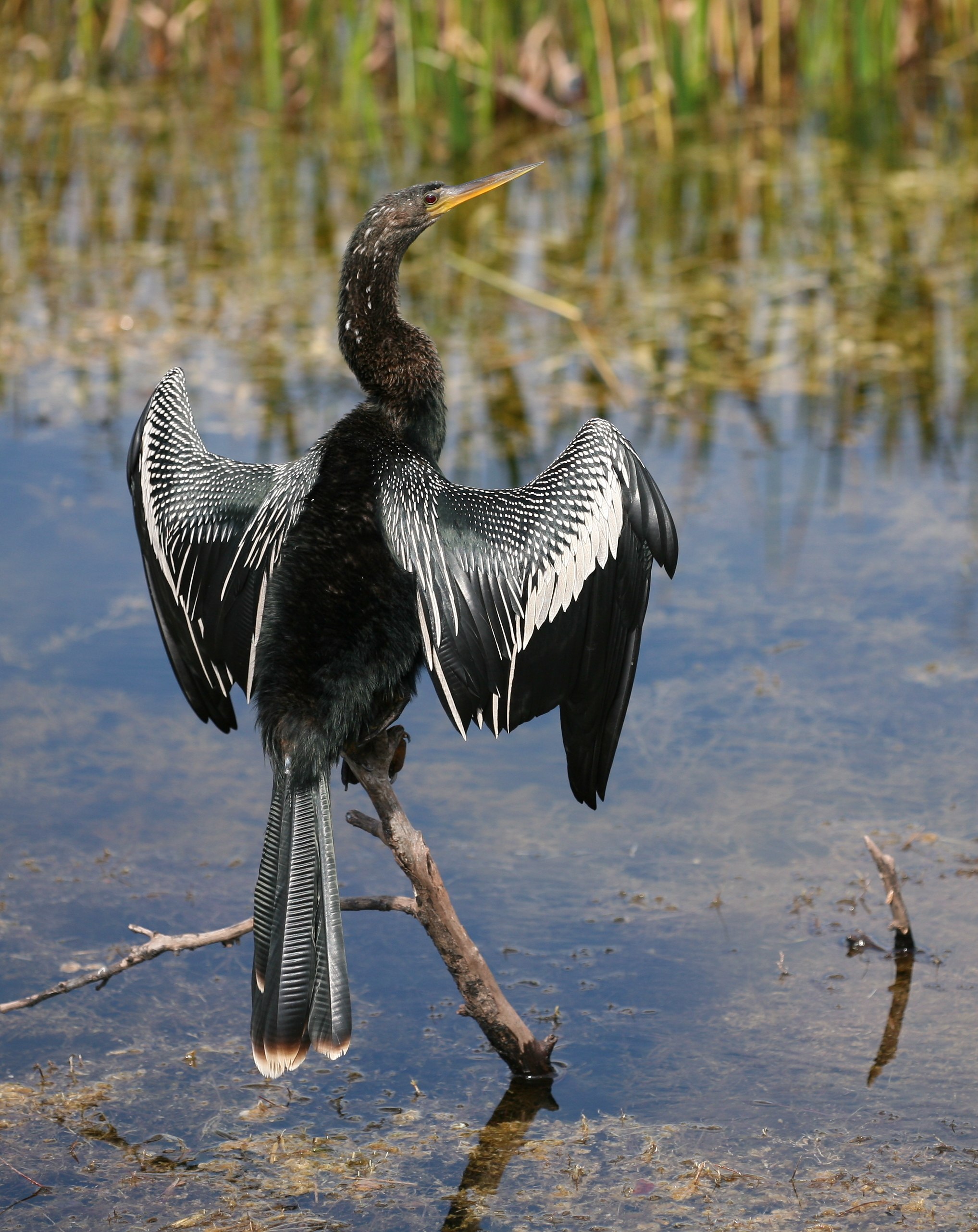
The namesake of Anhinga Trail dries its feathers

CERP projects are designed to capture 1.7 billion US gallons (6,400,000 m^{3}) of fresh water every day, store it in underground reservoirs, and release the water to areas within 16 counties in South Florida. Approximately 35,600 acres (55.6 sq mi; 144.1 km^{2}) of man-made wetlands are to be constructed to confine contaminated water before it is released to the Everglades, and 240 miles (390 km) of canals that divert water away from the Everglades are to be destroyed. During the first five years of implementation, CERP was responsible for the purchase of 207,000 acres (323.4 sq mi; 837.7 km^{2}) of land at a cost of $1 billion. The plan aims to spend $10.5 billion over 30 years, combining 50 different projects and giving them 5-year timelines.

Everglades National Park was directly hit by Hurricanes Katrina, Wilma, and Rita in 2005. Such storms are a natural part of the park's ecosystem; 1960's Hurricane Donna left nothing in the mangroves but "standing dead snags" several miles wide, but 30 years later the area had completely recovered. Predictably, what suffered the most in the park from the 2005 hurricanes were man-made structures. In 2009 the original lodge at Flamingo, which was irreparably damaged by 125 mph (201 km/h) winds and an 8 ft (2.4 m) storm surge, was demolished; the lodge had been functioning for 50 years when it was torn down. The park suffered further damage from Hurricane Irma in 2017, which caused extensive damage to the coastal mangrove forests, further damaged the park facilities at Flamingo, and destroyed the original Gulf Coast Visitor Center.

=== Park economics ===
Everglades National Park reported in 2005 a budget of over $28 million. Of that, $14.8 million was granted from the National Park Service and $13.5 million from various sources including CERP, donations, and other grants. The entry fee for private vehicles in 2021 is $30. Of the nearly one million visitors to Everglades National Park in 2006, more than 38,000 were overnight campers, paying $16 a night or $10 a night for backcountry permits. Visitors spent $2.6 million within the park and $48 million in local economies. More than 900 jobs were sustained or created within or by the park, and the park added value of $35 million to local economies. While the park generates substantial economic value through tourism, the cost of restoring its degraded ecosystem is often a topic of debate. However, research indicates that successful restoration would generate significant economic value by improving ecological services. This suggests an economic strategy that would help the park’s long-term financial contribution to the region.

=== Administration ===
The park was placed into Administrative Region I in 1937, when the regions were first established. Region I was retitled the Southeast Region in 1962, which was restructured into the Southeast Area in 1995. The reorganized unified Interior regions put it in the new Region 2.

== Activities ==
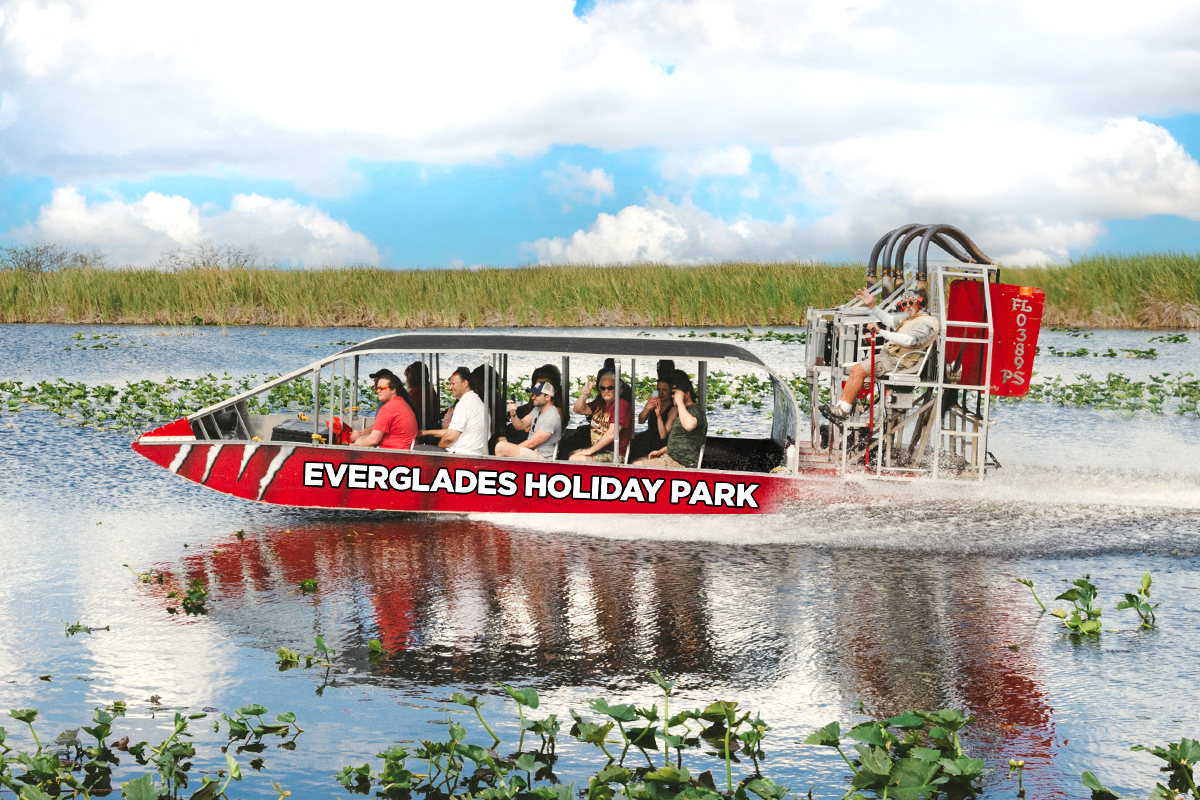
Everglades fun family air boat ride

The busiest season for visitors is from December to March, when temperatures are lowest and mosquitoes are least active. The park features five visitor centers: on the Tamiami Trail (part of U.S. Route 41) directly west of Miami is the Shark Valley Visitor Center. A fifteen-mile (24 km) round trip path leads from this center to a two-story observation tower. Tram tours are available during the busy season. Closest to Homestead on State Road 9336 is the Ernest F. Coe Visitor Center, where a 38-mile (61 km) road begins, winding through pine rockland, cypress, freshwater marl prairie, coastal prairie, and mangrove ecosystems. Various hiking trails are accessible from the road, which runs to the Guy Bradley Visitor Center and marina at Flamingo, open and staffed during the busier time of the year. The Marjory Stoneman Douglas Visitor Center is closest to Everglades City on State Road 29 along the west coast. The Marjory Stoneman Douglas Visitor Center gives canoers access to the Wilderness Waterway, a 99-mile (160 km) canoe trail that extends to the Visitor Center at Flamingo. The former Royal Palm State Park was the site of the first Everglades National Park visitor center and later became the Royal Palm Visitor Center within the park. The western coast of the park and the Ten Thousand Islands and the various key islands in Florida Bay are accessible only by boat.

=== Trails ===
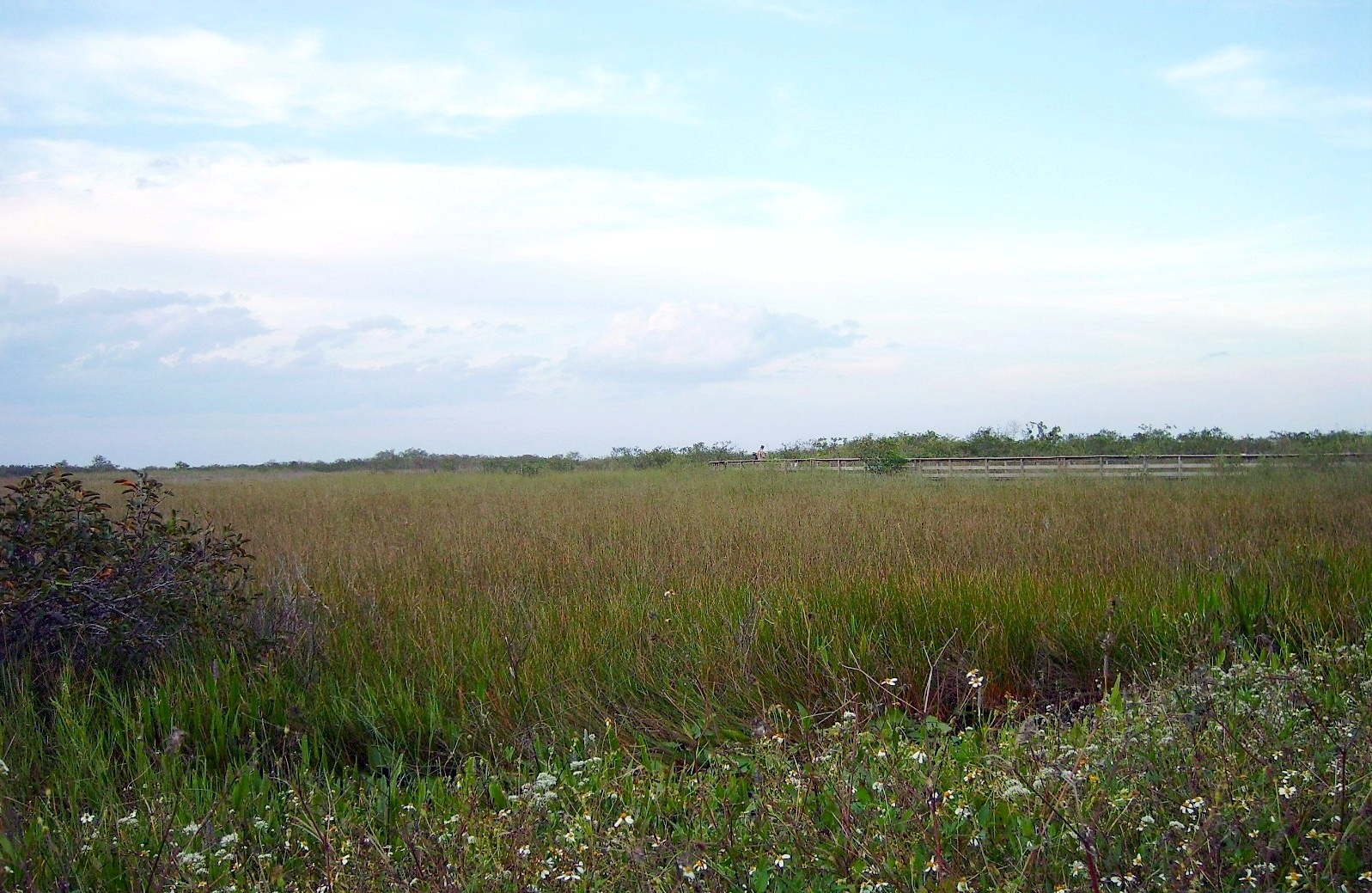
A view of vast sawgrass expanse north of the Anhinga Trail gives visitors an opportunity to see a freshwater slough up close.

Several walking trails in the park vary in hiking difficulty on Pine Island, where visitors can cross hardwood hammocks, pinelands, and freshwater sloughs. Starting at the Royal Palm Visitor Center, the Anhinga Trail is a half-mile self-guided tour through a sawgrass marsh where visitors can see alligators, marsh and wading birds, turtles, and bromeliads. Its proximity to Homestead and its accessibility makes it one of the most visited sites in the park. The nearby Gumbo Limbo Trail is also self-guided, at half-mile long. It loops through a canopy of hardwood hammocks that include gumbo limbo (Bursera simaruba), royal palms (Roystonea), strangler figs (Ficus aurea), and a variety of epiphytes.

Twenty-eight miles (45 km) of trails start near the Long Pine Key campgrounds and wind through Long Pine Key, well-suited for offroad cycling through the pine rocklands in the Marjory Stoneman Douglas Wilderness. Two boardwalks allow visitors to walk through a cypress forest at Pa-Hay-O-Kee, which also features a two-story overlook, and another at Mahogany Hammock (referring to Swietenia mahagoni) that takes hikers through a dense forest in the middle of a freshwater marl prairie. Closer to Flamingo, more rugged trails take visitors through mangrove swamps, along Florida Bay. Christian Point Trail, Snake Bight Trail, Rowdy Bend Trail and Coastal Prairie Trail allow viewing of shorebirds and wading birds among the mangroves. Portions of the trails may be impassable depending on the time of year, because of mosquitoes and water levels. Ranger-led tours take place in the busier season only.

=== Camping and recreation ===
Camping is available year-round in Everglades National Park. Camping with some services is available at Long Pine Key, close to the Ernest F. Coe Visitor Center, where 108 sites are accessible by car. Near Flamingo, 234 campsites with some services are also available. Recreational vehicle camping is available at these sites, but not with all necessary services. Back-country permits are required for campsites along the Wilderness Waterway, Gulf Coast sites, and sites in the various keys. Several back-country sites are chickees; others are beach and ground sites.

Flamingo Lodge has 24 guest rooms built from shipping containers and elevated above ground level; four rooms are wheelchair-accessible.

Low-powered motorboats are allowed in the park; the majority of salt water areas are no-wake zones to protect manatees and other marine animals from harm. Jet skis, airboats, and other motorized personal watercraft are prohibited. Many trails allow kayaks and canoes. A state license is required for fishing. Fresh water licenses are not sold in the park, but a salt water license may be available. Swimming is not recommended within the park boundaries; water moccasins, snapping turtles (Chelydra serpentina), alligators, and crocodiles thrive in fresh water. Sharks, barracuda, and sharp dangerous coral are plentiful in salt water. Visibility is low in both salt water and fresh water areas.

Everglades National Park is an important part of the Great Florida Birding Trail. It has great biodiversity and many species of birds for bird watching and bird photography also.

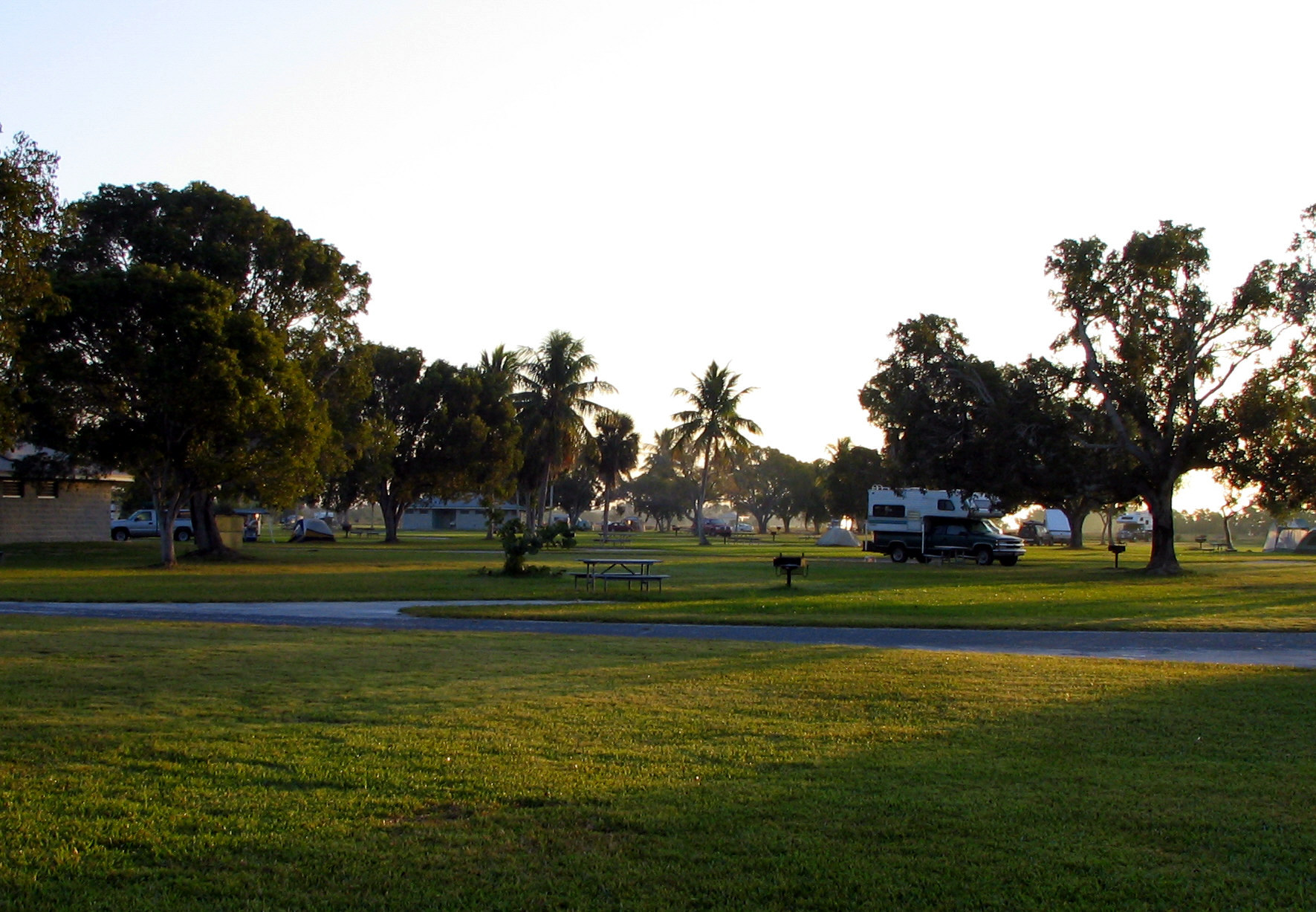
The campground at Flamingo

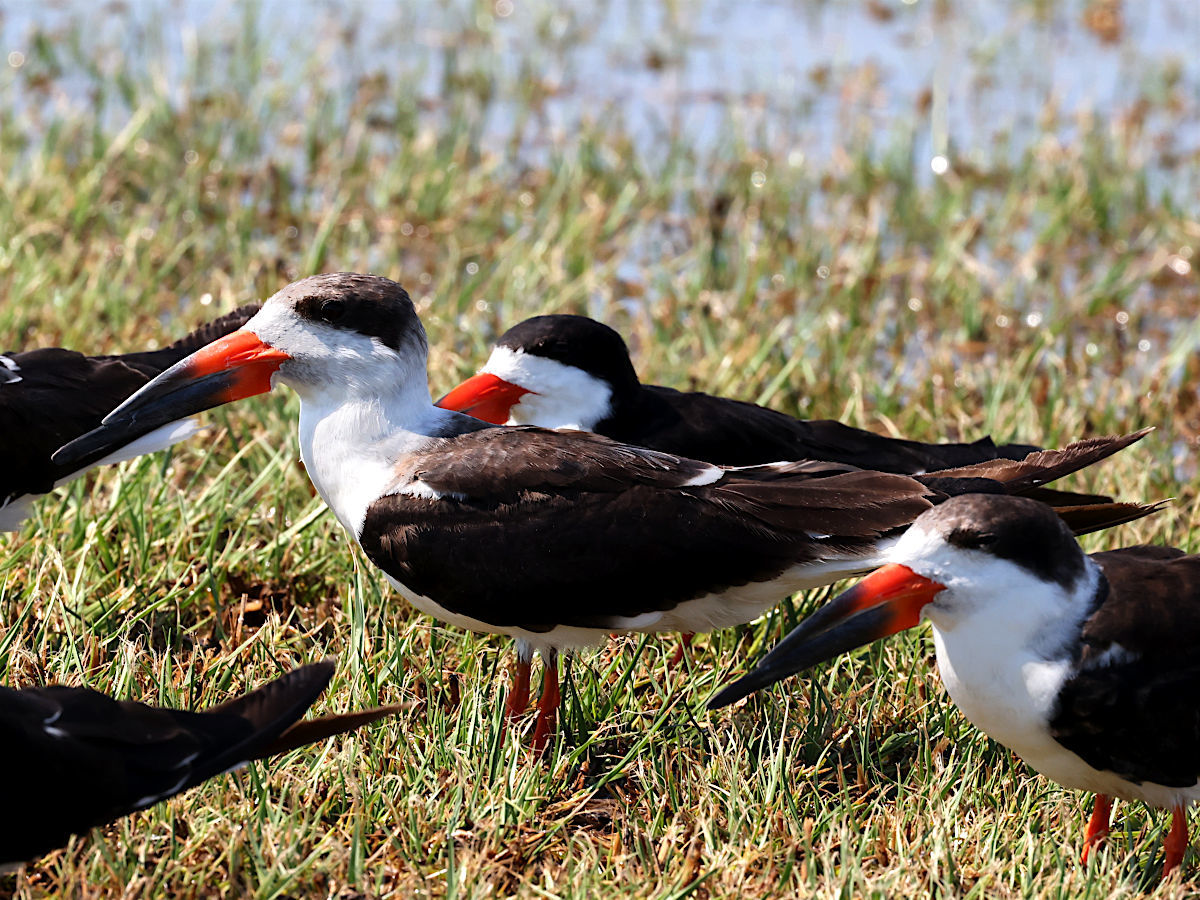
Black skimmers at Flamingo campground

=== Dark skies site ===
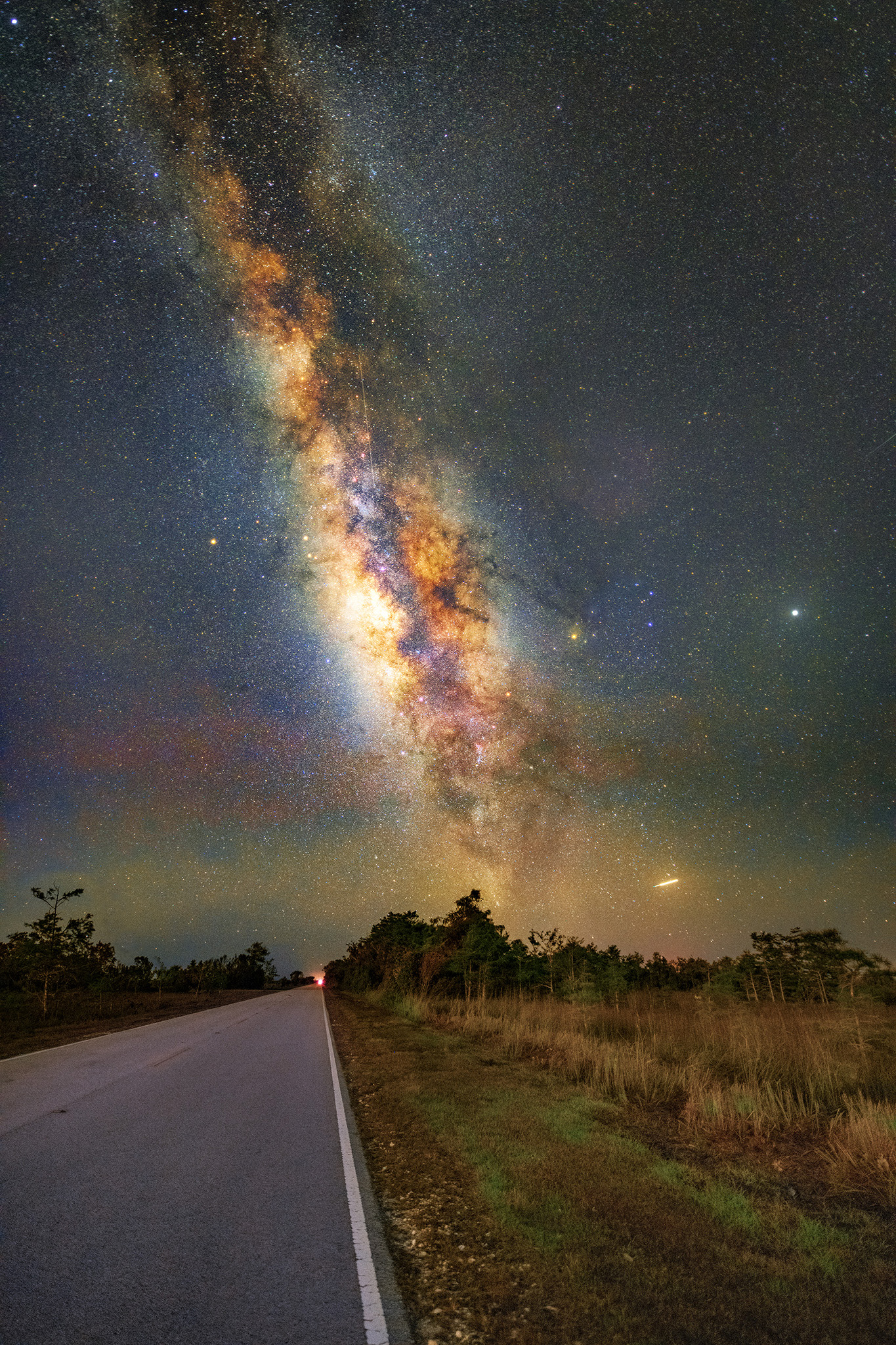
Twenty-second exposure of the Milky Way from the road to Flamingo

Portions of Everglades National Park are ideal for dark sky observations in South Florida.

The best viewing locations are in the remote southern and western areas of the Everglades, such as Flamingo and the Ten Thousand Islands. The Milky Way appears brightest when looking south, toward the least light-polluted areas.

From 2006 to 2024, light pollution levels in parts of the Everglades have shown minimal change, with the Sky Quality Meter (SQM) reading decreasing from 21.54 to 21.31 and the Bortle Scale shifting from 4.1 to 4.3, indicating relatively effective protection against light pollution.

== Threats to the park and ecology ==
=== Diversion and quality of water ===
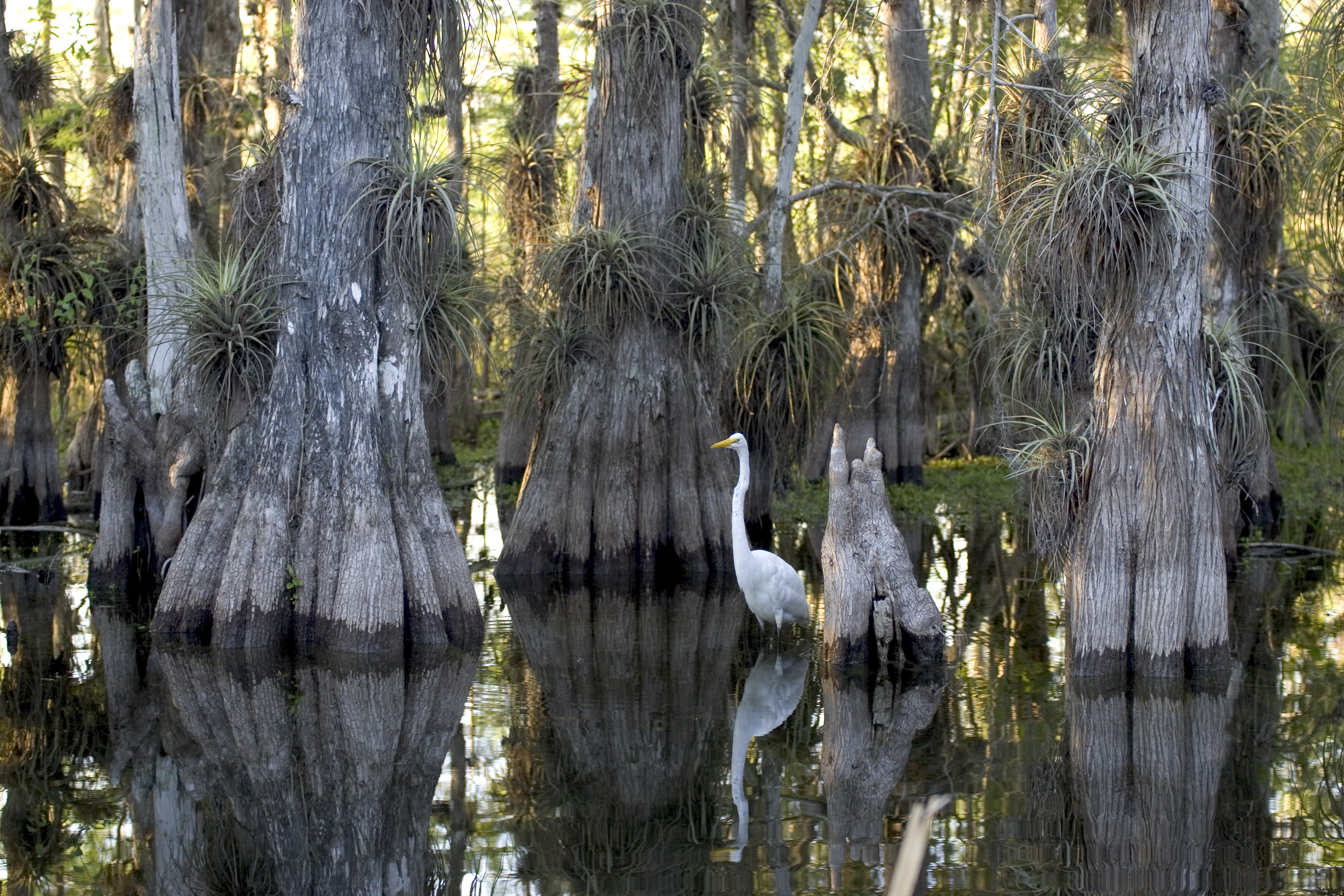
Bromeliads flourish on bald cypress trees as a great egret hunts in the water

Less than 50 percent of the Everglades which existed prior to drainage attempts remains intact today. Populations of wading birds dwindled 90 percent from their original numbers between the 1940s and 2000s. The diversion of water to South Florida's still-growing metropolitan areas is the Everglades National Park's number one threat. In the 1950s and 1960s, 1,400 miles (2,300 km) of canals and levees, 150 gates and spillways, and 16 pumping stations were constructed to direct water toward cities and away from the Everglades. Low levels of water leave fish vulnerable to reptiles and birds, and as sawgrass dries it can burn or die off, which in turn kills apple snails and other animals that wading birds feed upon. Populations of birds fluctuate; in 2009, the South Florida Water Management District claimed wading birds across South Florida increased by 335 percent. Following three years of increasing numbers, The Miami Herald reported in 2009 that populations of wading birds within the park decreased by 29 percent.

Cities along the west coast of Florida rely on desalinization for fresh water; the quantity demanded is too great for the land to provide. Nitrates in the underground water system and high levels of mercury also impact the quality of fresh water the park receives. In 1998, a Florida panther was found dead in Shark Water Slough, with levels of mercury high enough to kill a human. Increased occurrences of algal blooms and red tide in Biscayne Bay and Florida Bay have been traced to the amounts of controlled water released from Lake Okeechobee. The brochure given to visitors at Everglades National Park includes a statement that reads, "Freshwater flowing into the park is engineered. With the help of pumps, floodgates, and retention ponds along the park's boundary, the Everglades is presently on life support, alive but diminished." The park operates a comprehensive Hydrologic Monitoring Program that tracks the condition of freshwater, brackish, and saltwater systems throughout the Everglades landscape. The National Park Service states, this network of monitoring stations analyzes water quantity, timing, distribution, and quality to guide restoration efforts and assess ecosystem health.

=== Urban encroachment ===
A series of levees on the park's eastern border marks the line between urban and protected areas, but development into these areas threatens the park system. Florida still attracts nearly a thousand new residents every day, and building residential, commercial and industrial zones near Everglades National Park stresses the water balance and ecosystems within the park. On the park's western border, Fort Myers, Naples, and Cape Coral are expanding, but no system of levees exists to mark that border. National Geographic rated both Everglades National Park and Big Cypress National Preserve the lowest-scoring parks in North America, at 32 out of 100. Their scoring system rated 55 parks by their sustainable tourism, destination quality, and park management. The experts who compiled the results justified the score by stating: "Encroachment by housing and retail development has thrown the precious ecosystem into a tailspin, and if humankind doesn't back off, there will be nothing left of one of this country's most amazing treasures". With an increase in Urban encroachment, the idea of a park having clean and clear views is affected by increase air pollution. According to the National Park Service, pollutants carried into the park can degrade the vegetation, aquatic ecosystems, and wildlife within the park environment.

=== Climate change and sea level rise ===
Climate change, particularly sea level rise, poses a critical and long-term threat to Everglades National Park. The park having low topography makes it exceptionally vulnerable to saltwater intrusion from rising sea levels. The ecosystem is altered when freshwater aquifers and sawgrass marshes become salinized. Coastal freshwater forests, such as dwarf cypress strands and marl prairies, are already experiencing a collapse as saltwater pushes inland killing vegetation. The loss of these freshwater habitats endangers the species that depend on them, including wading birds, the endangered Everglades snail kite, and the Florida panther. As saltwater comes closer inland it will become more challenging to maintain the correct volume and timing of freshwater flow to repel saltwater. Ultimately, preserving existing ridge and slough landscape becomes increasingly more difficult and costly. Florida climate is sporadic, where it has drastic changes in rainfall patterns and more frequent extreme events than other places in the world. Because of that, we see that it constantly affects the state’s major water resources. A recent synthesis shows that changes in precipitation/droughts/storms or hurricanes can actually change groundwater recharge and surface-water availability, which in turn has an overall bigger effect on the quantity and timing of freshwater reaching the Everglades/coastal wetlands. These changes can make it where there is an accelerated saltwater intrusion that goes inside of the aquifers and estuaries. This also compounds with the idea that existing sea-level-rise also changes the park’s freshwater ecosystems.

=== Endangered and threatened animals ===
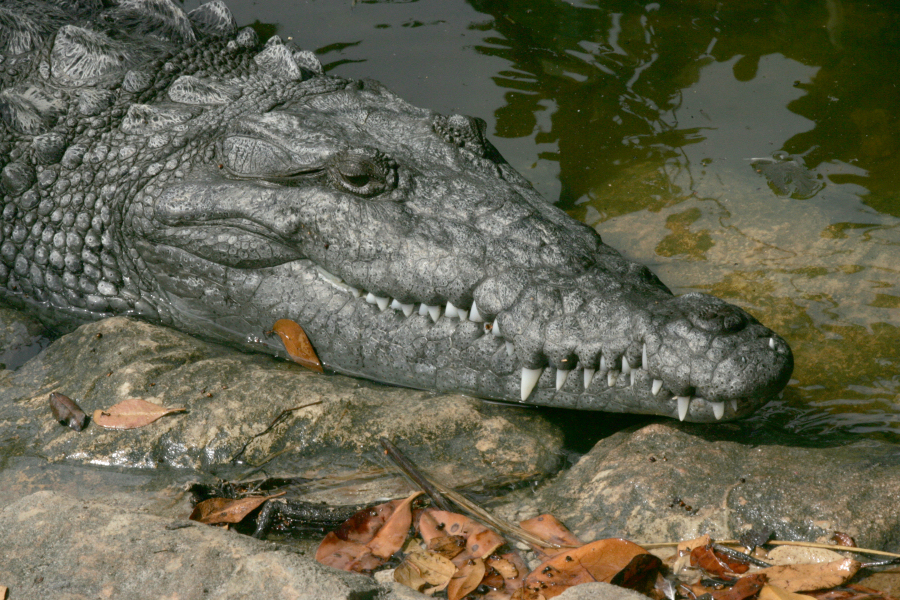
The American crocodile has notable differences from the alligator. Habitat destruction and vehicle collisions are some of the largest threats it experiences.

Thirty-six federally protected animals live in the park, some of which face grave threats to their survival.

In the United States, the American crocodile's only habitat is within South Florida. They were once overhunted for their hides. They are protected today from hunting but are still threatened by habitat destruction and injury from vehicle collisions when crossing roads to reach waterways. About 2,000 crocodiles live in Florida, and there are roughly 100 nests in the Everglades and Biscayne National Parks. Crocodile populations in South Florida have increased as has the number of alligators. Crocodiles were reclassified from "endangered" to "threatened" in the United States in 2007.

The Florida panther is one of the most endangered mammals on earth. About 230 live in the wild, primarily in the Everglades and the Big Cypress Swamp. The biggest threats to the panther include habitat destruction from human development, vehicle collisions, inbreeding due to their limited gene pool, parasites, diseases, and mercury poisoning.

Four Everglade species of sea turtle including the Atlantic green sea turtle, the Atlantic hawksbill, the Atlantic loggerhead (Caretta caretta), and the Atlantic ridley (Lepidochelys kempii) are endangered. Also, the leatherback sea turtle (Dermochelys coriacea) is threatened. Numbers are difficult to determine, since males and juveniles do not return to their birthplace. Females, however lay eggs in the same location every year. Habitat loss, illegal poaching, and destructive fishing practices are the biggest threats to these animals.

The range of the Cape Sable seaside sparrow is restricted to Everglades National Park and the Big Cypress Swamp. In 1981, 6,656 Cape Sable seaside sparrows were reported in park boundaries, but surveys over 10 years documented a decline to an estimated 2,624 birds by 2002. Attempts to return natural levels of water to the park have been controversial; Cape Sable seaside sparrows nest about a foot off the ground, and rising water levels may harm future populations, as well as threaten the locally endangered snail kite. The Everglades snail kite eats apple snails almost exclusively, and the Everglades is the only location in the United States where this bird of prey exists. There is some evidence that the population may be increasing, but the loss of habitat and food sources keep the estimated number of these birds at several hundred. The Everglade snail kite is an endangered raptor that depends on wetland habitats. It is constantly being affected by changes in the regional “hydroscape”, where recent work shows that changes in water levels and hydroperiods affect the species’ range dynamics along with movements and site use across central and south Florida wetlands. That is what the results are, and what we can learn from it is that water-management decisions and restoration actions that change flooding patterns can either support or undermine nesting success and foraging opportunities for this species.

The West Indian manatee has been upgraded from endangered to threatened. Collisions with boats and habitat loss are still its biggest threats.

=== Drought, fire, and rising sea levels ===
Fire naturally occurs after lightning storms but takes its heaviest toll when water levels are low. Hardwood hammock and cypress trees are susceptible to heavy damage from fire, and some may take decades to grow back. Peat built up over centuries in the marsh can cause fires to burn deep scars in the soil. In 2007, during a severe regional drought, Fred Sklar of the South Florida Water Management District said: "An extreme drought can be viewed (as) almost as catastrophic as a volcano. It can reshape the entire landscape. It can take 1,000 years to produce two inches of peat, and you can lose those couple of inches in a week."

Rising sea levels caused by global warming are another threat to the future of the park. Since 1932, ocean levels at Key West have steadily risen over 0.7 feet (0.2 m), which could have disastrous consequences for land so close to the ocean. It is estimated that within 500 years freshwater habitats in the Everglades National Park will be obliterated by salt water, leaving only the northernmost portion of the Everglades. Cost estimates for raising or replacing the Tamiami Trail and Alligator Alley with bridges are in the hundreds of millions of dollars. Salt water intrusion is expected to have devastating effects on the parks 289 archeological sites and the 111 post colonial sites as a rise in six feet could inundate or alter groundwater levels at half these locations.

Through Trump Administration, The Florida Department of Transportation, and Everglades National Park, there are plans to execute and complete the Next Steps project to help fix these various water issues, along with other parts of the park. This completion plan was announced in September 2020, will begin November 2020, and should be done by the end of 2024.

In recent years, scientists have observed that inland freshwater sites within Everglades National Park are experiencing water-level increases similar to regional sea-level rise, which highlights how vulnerable the park’s low-elevation freshwater habitats are to climate change. The Cape Sable area has seen one of the most dramatic landscape changes within the National Park due to the rising sea levels. Alterations to hydrology and saltwater intrusion threaten the ecosystem's ability to support native vegetation and wildlife communities.

=== Non-native species ===
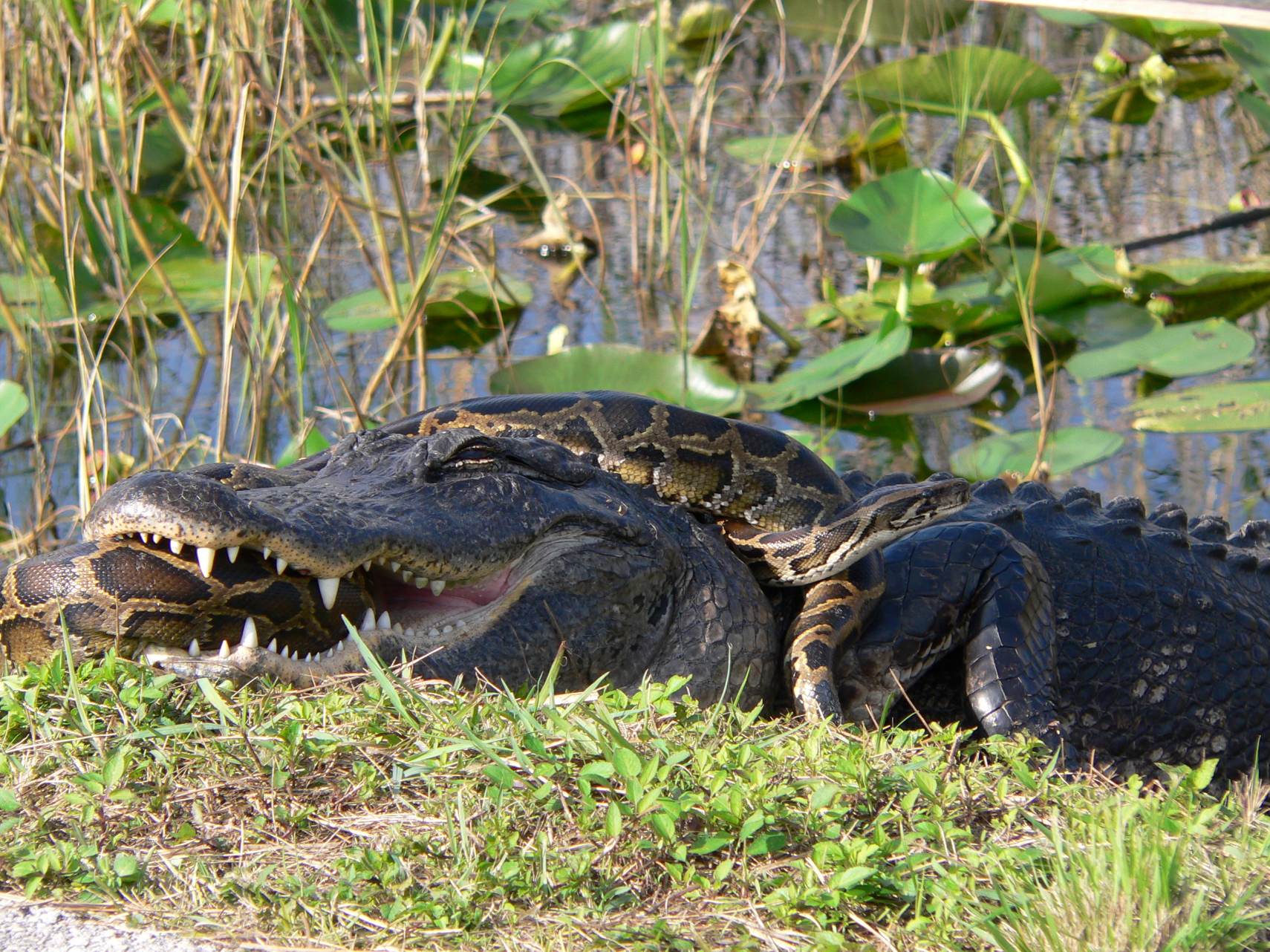
A struggle between a Burmese python and an alligator

The introduction of non-native species into South Florida is a considerable problem for the park. Many of the biological controls such as weather, disease, and consumers who naturally limit plants in their native environments do not exist in the Everglades, causing many to grow larger and multiply far beyond their average numbers in their native habitats. Approximately 26 percent of all fish, reptiles, birds, and mammal species in South Florida are exotic—more than in any other part of the U.S.—and the region hosts one of the highest numbers of exotic plant species in the world.

Species that adapt the most aggressively to conditions in the Everglades, by spreading quickly or competing with native species that sometimes are threatened or endangered, are called "invasive". Thousands of exotic plant species have been observed in South Florida, usually introduced as ornamental landscaping, but park staff must eradicate such invasive plants as melaleuca tree (Melaleuca quinquenervia), Brazilian pepper (Schinus terebinthifolius), and Old World climbing fern (Lygodium microphyllum). Similarly, animals often do not find the predators or natural barriers to reproduction in the Everglades as they do where they originate, thus they often reproduce more quickly and efficiently. Lobate lac scale insects (Paratachardina pseudolobata) kill shrubs and other plants in hardwood hammocks. Bromeliad beetles (Metamasius callizona) destroy bromeliads and the ecosystems they host.

Walking catfish (Clarias batrachus) can deplete aquaculture stocks and they carry enteric septicemia. The Florida Fish and Wildlife Conservation Commission (FWC) listed eight "Reptiles of Concern", including the Burmese python (Python molurus bivittatus), focusing on them for their large sizes and aggressive natures, allowing licensed hunters to kill any listed animals in protected areas and sell their meat and hides. Burmese pythons, two subspecies of African rock pythons (Python sebae; northern and southern), and yellow anacondas (Eunectes notaeus) were banned from import into the U.S. in 2012. United States Secretary of the Interior Ken Salazar announced the inclusion of these reptiles at Everglades National Park. These Burmese pythons have proven to be a major ecological concern, where recent population modeling has shown us that the geographic range of pythons in south Florida can go even further north and west, with suitable habitat going beyond the current core invasion area. These can be considered some serious projections that could tell us about any current risks to the native mammals along with other prey species. This is because python predation can restructure food webs and reduce biodiversity over large portions of the region. Exotic species control falls under the management of the U.S. Fish and Wildlife Service, which has been compiling and disseminating information about invasive species since 1994. Control of invasive species costs $500 million per year, but 1,700,000 acres (2,656.2 sq mi; 6,879.7 km^{2}) of land in South Florida remains infested.

The National Park Foundation is in works with the Everglades National Park to commence a joint project to restore the Saline Glades by eradicating the invasive Australian Pine Trees. The Trees outcompete native plants such as the mangroves and uptake more freshwater than any other vegetation.

== See also ==
- List of birds of Everglades National Park
- List of national parks of the United States
- Dry Tortugas National Park
- Environmental Impact of the Big Cypress Swamp Jetport
- Nike Missile Site HM-69
- World Heritage Sites in Danger
- South Florida Detention Facility

== Bibliography ==
- Davis, Jack (2009), An Everglades Providence: Marjory Stoneman Douglas and the American Environmental Century, University of Georgia Press (2009). ISBN 0-8203-3071-X
- Douglas, Marjory (1947). The Everglades: River of Grass. Florida Classics Library. ISBN 0-912451-44-0
- Ferriter, Amy; Serbesoff-King, Kristina; Bodle, Mike; Goodyear, Carole; Doren, Bob; Langeland, Ken (2004). Chapter 8E: Exotic Species in the Everglades Protection Area, South Florida Water Management District
- Grunwald, Michael (2006). The Swamp: The Everglades, Florida, and the Politics of Paradise. Simon & Schuster. ISBN 978-0-7432-5105-1
- Hammer, Roger (2005). Everglades National Park and the Surrounding Area: A Guide to Exploring the Great Outdoors, Morris Book Publishing, LLC. ISBN 978-0-7627-3432-0
- Lodge, Thomas (2005). The Everglades Handbook: Understanding the Ecosystem. CRC Press. ISBN 1-56670-614-9
- McCally, David (1999). The Everglades: An Environmental History. University Press of Florida. ISBN 0-8130-2302-5
- Robertson, Jr. William (1989). Everglades: The Park Story. Florida National Parks & Monuments Association, Inc. ISBN 0-945142-01-3
- Rodgers, LeRoy; Bodle, Mike; Laroche, Francois (2010). Chapter 9: Status of Nonindigenous Species in the South Florida Environment, 2010 South Florida Environmental Report (Volume I), South Florida Water Management District.
- South Florida Water Management District (2010). Chapter 6: Ecology of the Everglades Protection Area. 2010 South Florida Environmental Report: Volume I—The South Florida Environment. Retrieved on May 26, 2010.
- Tebeau, Charlton W. (1955). The Story of the Chokoloskee Bay County and the Reminiscences of Pioneer C. S. "Ted" Smallwood, University of Miami Press.
- Tebeau, Charlton W. (1963) They Lived in the Park: The Story of Man in the Everglades National Park, University of Miami Press.
- Tebeau, Charlton W. (1968) Man in the Everglades, University of Miami Press. ISBN 978-0-87024-073-7
- Whitney, Ellie et al., eds. (2004). Priceless Florida: Natural Ecosystems and Native Species, Pineapple Press, Inc. ISBN 978-1-56164-309-7
