= Everglades & Dry Tortugas Biosphere Reserve =

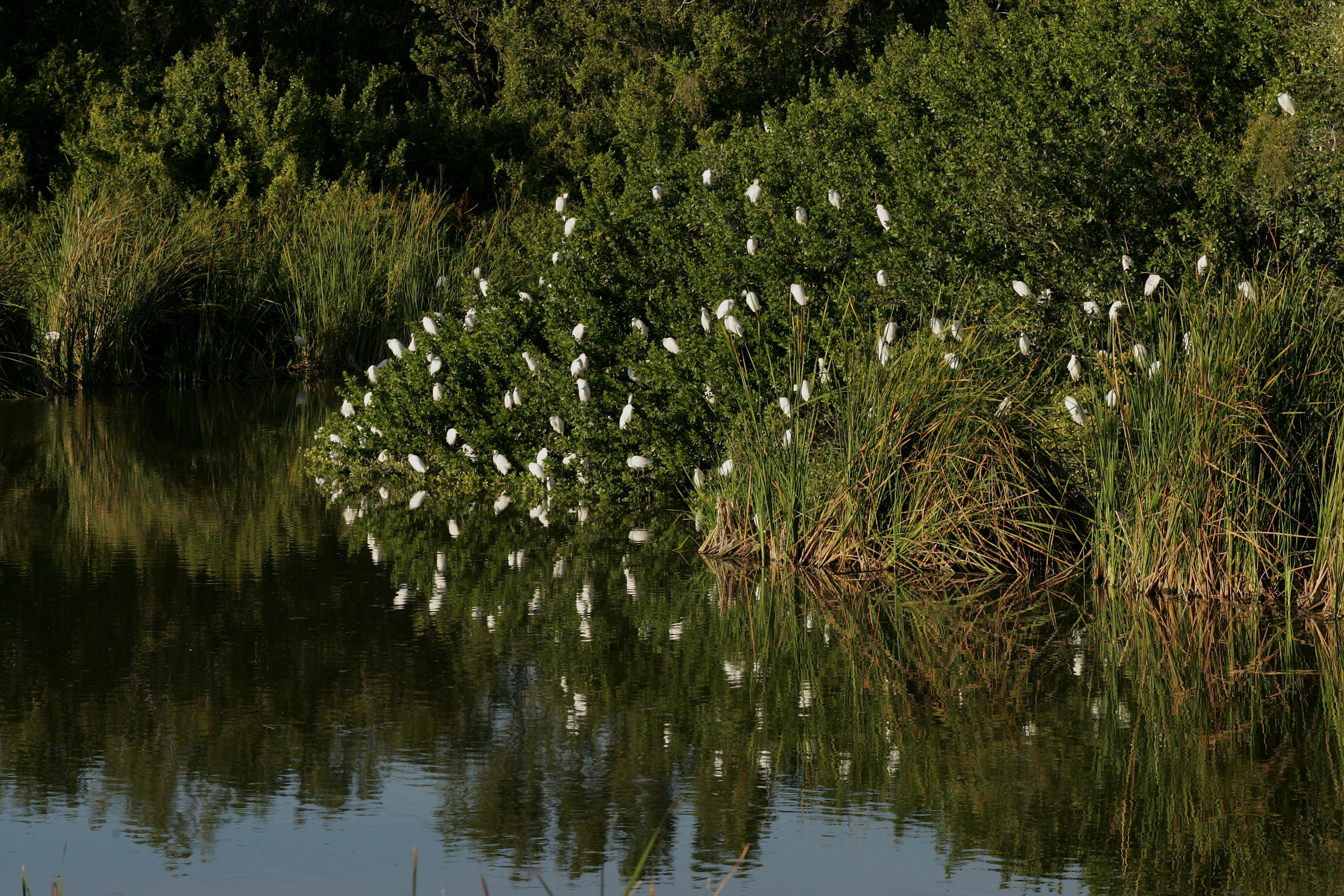
- Snowy egrets in Everglades National Park

- Location within Florida Location within the United States
- Location: Florida, US
- Coordinates: 25°1′48″N 80°45′0″W
- Area: 636,411 hectares (2,457.20 sq mi)
- Established: 1976

The Everglades & Dry Tortugas Biosphere Reserve (established 1976) is a UNESCO Biosphere Reserve in Florida and the Gulf of Mexico. The 636,411 hectares (2,457.20 sq mi) reserve encompasses Everglades National Park and Dry Tortugas National Park, including historic Fort Jefferson and the seven Dry Tortugas islands.

== Ecological characteristics ==
Everglades National Park is a shallow basin tilted to the southwest and underlain by extensive Pleistocene limestones.

Dry Tortugas National Park consists of a group of seven coral reefs with three major banks (Pulaski, Loggerhead and Long Key) forming a pseudo-atoll with a mud-bank type structure.

The biosphere reserve lies at the interface between tropical and subtropical America encompassing a transition from fresh to brackish water, shallow bays, deeper coastal waters and coral reefs, thus creating a complex of habitats that support a high diversity of flora and fauna.

The area of transition from freshwater (glades) to saltwater (mangrove) is a highly productive zone that incubates great numbers of economically valuable crustaceans. Southern Florida vegetation is unique in the United States, though similar plant communities are found throughout the Caribbean and parts of tropical America.

Habitats include freshwater and wet prairies characterized by islands of tropical hardwood trees; salt marshes; mangrove forests; beach and dune complexes; brackish water estuaries; cypress swamps; marine systems; and coral reefs.

== Human activities ==
The reserve contains some 200 known archaeological sites, with two archaeological districts nominated in the National Register of Historic Places. Historic use has left a rich record from Native American use, settlement, farming and fishing activities.

A Native American group, the Miccosukee Tribe of Florida, has a special use trust area inside the Everglades National Park for tribal headquarters, visitor center, housing and businesses.

In 1990, some 40 park personnel and 50-100 concession personnel lived in residential areas in the parks, which then had a combined 84,000 visitors according to UNESCO. Visitation at Dry Tortugas reached a peak of 83,704 in 2000, and averaged about 63,000 per year in the period from 2007 to 2016; as of 2017, an average of one million people visited Everglades National Park each year. The area, at that time, received more than 84,000 visitors for snorkeling, swimming, sport fishing and touring historic sites. The Everglades Regional Collection Center houses some 50,000 biological and cultural museum artifacts and archives, as well as a library with 10,000 volumes. In 2019, the Dry Tortugas islands (census tract 9801) had a permanent population of 0. The area receives more than 84,000 visitors for snorkeling, swimming, sport fishing and touring the historic sites. The Everglades Regional Collection Center houses some 50,000 biological and cultural museum artifacts and archives, as well as a library with 10,000 volumes.

Fort Jefferson National Monument offers excellent research possibilities on coral reef ecology, subtropical islands, bird migrations, and fisheries (IUCN, 1990).

== Sources ==
This article incorporates text from a free content work (license statement/permission). Text taken from UNESCO - MAB Biosphere Reserves Directory, UNESCO, UNESCO.
