= Environmental Impact of the Big Cypress Swamp Jetport =

1969 report on a planned Florida jetport

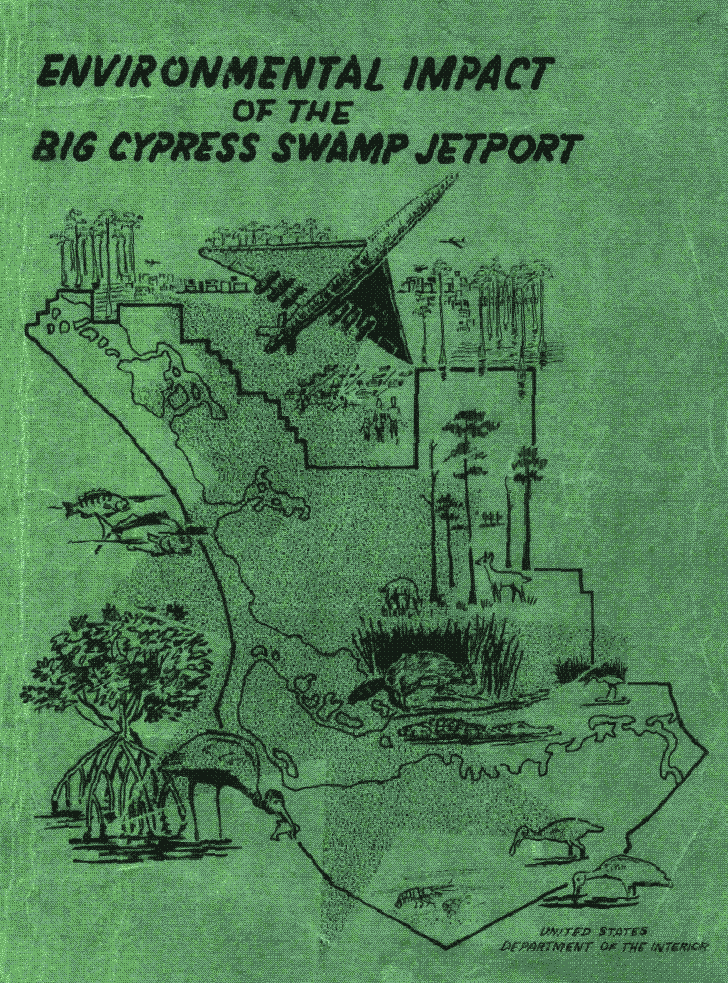
Cover of the report

The "Environmental Impact of the Big Cypress Swamp Jetport", unofficially known as the "Leopold Report" or the "Leopold-Marshall Report", was a report authored by hydrologist Luna Leopold of the United States Geological Service for the Department of the Interior and officially released on September 17, 1969. Arthur R. Marshall, formerly of the United States Fish and Wildlife Service, helped draft the report. It is considered the first ecological impact report in the state of Florida.

== Background ==
On June 2, 1969, Walter Hickel, Secretary of the Interior in the Nixon administration, created a select committee to conduct an inquiry into a proposed jetport for supersonic transport in what is now known as the Big Cypress National Preserve on the border of the Everglades National Park in Florida. The proposed Everglades Jetport would have had six runways for supersonic aircraft, making it the largest airport in the world at the time. Russell E. Train, then undersecretary of the Department of the Interior, appointed Luna Leopold of the USGS to direct the environmental impact assessment. Before the report was published, Wisconsin Senator Gaylord Nelson leaked key conclusions from the report in defense of the Everglades: "Either we stop the jetport at the present site, or we publicly admit that we are going to destroy the park."

== Findings ==
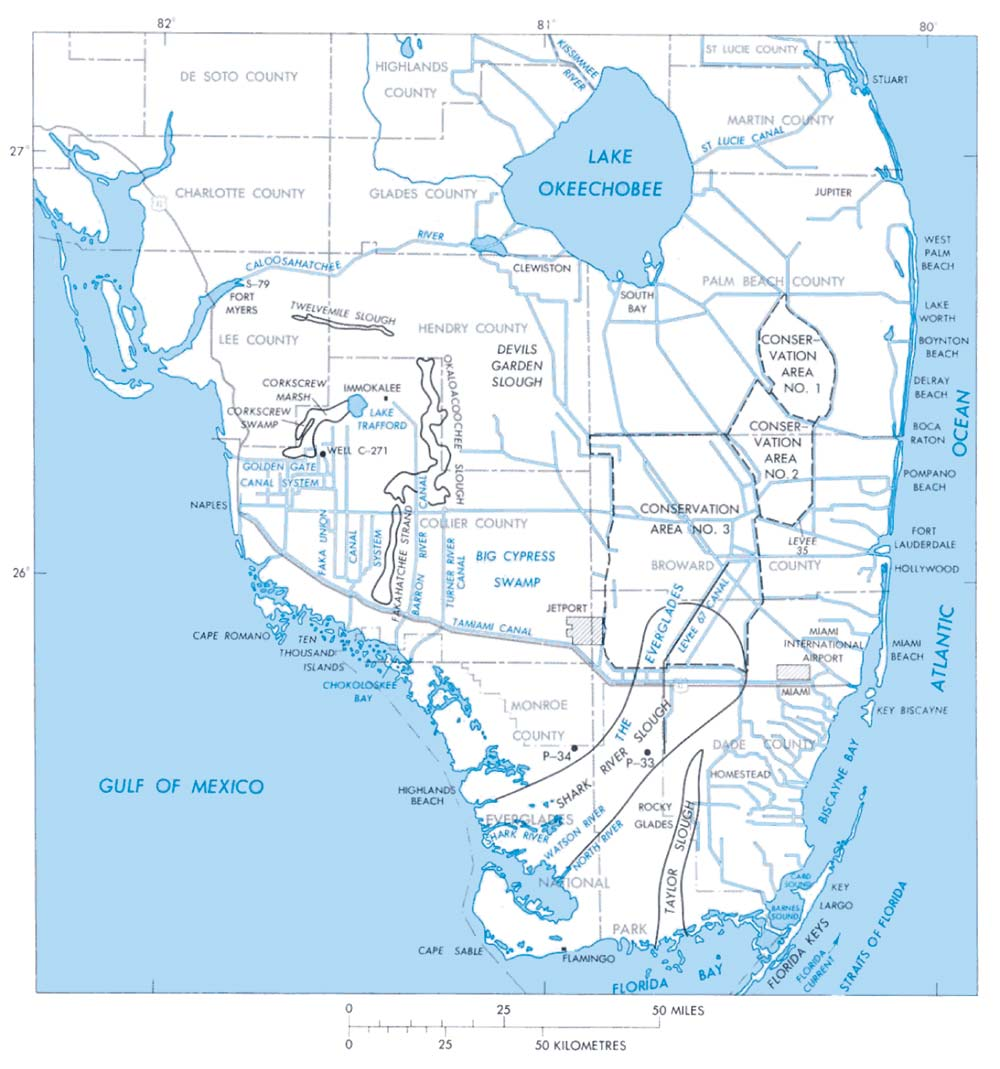
Location of the proposed jetport within a 101 km^{2} (39 sq mi) area selected by the Port Authority.

When the report was finally released, Leopold began by stating his strong opposition to the plan: "Development of the proposed jetport and its attendant facilities will lead to land drainage and development for agriculture, transportation, and services in the Big Cypress Swamp which will inexorably destroy the south Florida ecosystem and thus the Everglades National Park." A report from the National Academy of Sciences was subsequently published the next day supporting the findings of the Leopold report.

== Outcome ==
Because the jetport did not meet the necessary standards, Walter Hickel opposed it. Hickel successfully defeated the construction of the jetport by preventing it from being listed by the Department of Transportation for funding under an airport development program. Although construction of only one runway was completed, the remains of the Everglades Jetport was later opened as the Dade-Collier Training and Transition Airport and is sometimes used as an aviation training facility.
