= Dade-Collier Training and Transition Airport =

Public airport in the Florida Everglades

Coordinates: 25°51′42″N 080°53′49″W

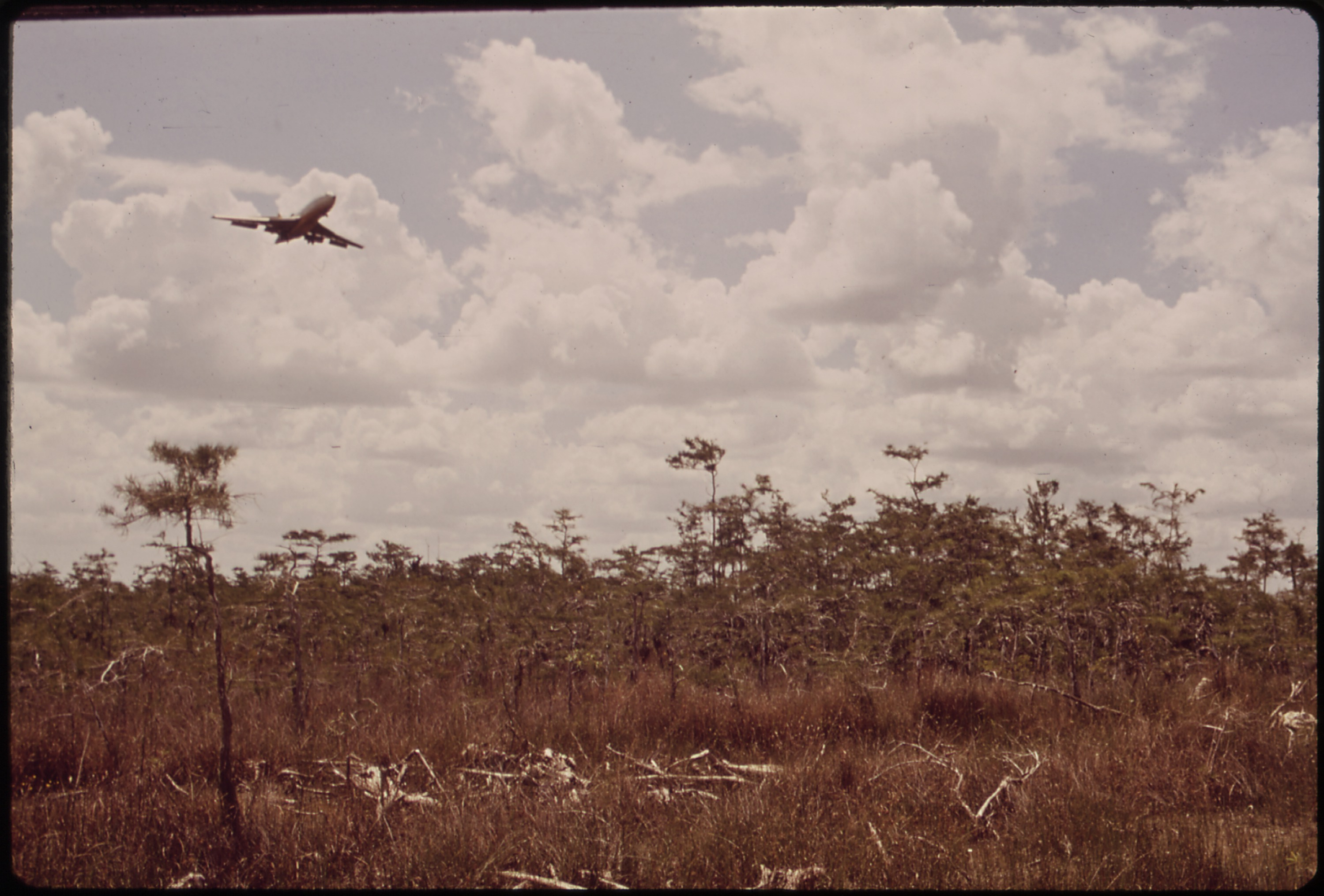
- A Boeing 727 lands at what was originally the Miami-Dade Jetport in July 1972.
- IATA: TNT; ICAO: KTNT; FAA LID: TNT

Summary
- Airport type: Public
- Owner: Miami-Dade County
- Operator: Miami-Dade Aviation Department (MDAD)
- Serves: Miami-Dade / Collier Counties
- Elevation AMSL: 13 ft (4.0 m)
- Website: miami-airport.com/dade_collier

Maps
- Location in the United States Location in Florida
- Interactive map of Dade-Collier Training and Transition Airport

Runways
Direction	Length		Surface
Direction	ft	m	Surface
9/27	10,499	3,200	Asphalt

Statistics (2018)
- Aircraft operations (year ending 10/10/2018): 14,468
- Source: Federal Aviation Administration

Dade-Collier Training and Transition Airport, formerly the Everglades Jetport, (IATA: TNT, ICAO: KTNT, FAA LID: TNT) is a former public airport located within the Florida Everglades, in unincorporated Collier County, Florida, 36 miles (58 km) west of the central business district of Miami. It is owned by Miami-Dade County and operated by the Miami-Dade Aviation Department. The airport is on Tamiami Trail near the border between Dade and Collier counties in central South Florida. It serves as a makeshift immigration detention facility being used by the U.S. Department of Homeland Security.

== History ==
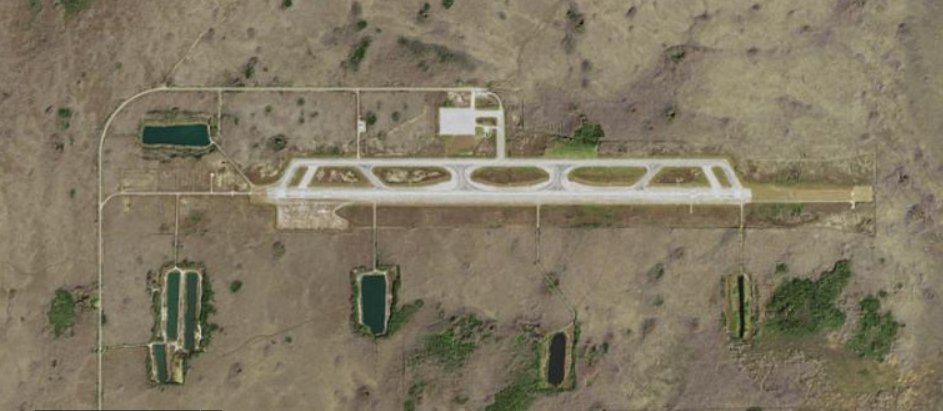
Satellite view

Begun in 1968 as the Everglades Jetport (also known as Big Cypress Jetport or Big Cypress Swamp Jetport), the airport was planned to be the largest airport in the world, covering 39 square miles (100 km^{2}) with six runways, and connected to both central Miami and the Gulf of Mexico by an expressway and monorail line. The airport would have been five times the size of JFK Airport in New York. At the time, the Boeing 2707 was under development and it was anticipated that supersonic aircraft would dominate long-haul air transportation. South Florida was viewed as an ideal location for an intercontinental SST hub due to the limitation that such aircraft would have to fly over water. Because of environmental concerns and the cancellation of the 2707 program, construction was halted in 1970 after the completion of just one 10,500' runway. The remaining land became the Big Cypress National Reserve.

Although the facility was unfinished and essentially abandoned, it was retained by the Miami-Dade local government as a general aviation and training airport. In the 1970s, it was used heavily by Pan Am and Eastern Airlines for commercial training, as the long runway at Dade-Collier could accommodate aircraft as large as Boeing 747s and was equipped with a relatively new instrument landing system, which allowed pilots to train for landing with low cloud ceilings and/or poor visibility. The isolation of the airport meant that it could be used for training flights 24/7 all year round, without interfering with the traffic at Miami International. The advent of flight simulators has made such training flights less economical, and the airport is now used much less frequently for commercial aircraft training purposes, although it remains open to general aviation.

== Facilities and aircraft ==
Dade-Collier Training and Transition Airport covers an area of 24,960 acres (39.0 sq mi; 101.0 km^{2}), which contains one asphalt paved runway (9/27) measuring 10,499 by 150 feet (3,200 m × 46 m). For the year ending October 10, 2018, the airport had 14,468 general aviation aircraft operations, an average of 39 per day. As of 2015, the airport had an average of 12 landings and take-offs per day.

== Immigration Detention Center ==
In July 2025, the state of Florida and U.S. Department of Homeland Security installed the South Florida Detention Facility, known informally as Alligator Alcatraz, an immigration detention center, on the airport grounds. The Florida Division of Emergency Management is operating the center consisting of tents and other facilities at an estimated cost of $450 million annually, plus construction costs. The cost is planned to be partially reimbursed by the federal government. The center has faced several controversies since opening. On August 21, 2025, Judge Kathleen Williams granted a preliminary injunction that prohibits the government from transferring any additional detainees to the site or performing any more construction work. The injunction has since been stayed pending appeals.

== Other uses ==
The facility has hosted high-speed automobile events.

Oil exploration on the site was considered in 2009, but not pursued due to resistance from conservation groups.

The Carlos Gimenez administration proposed holding a regular Miami air show at Dade-Collier, similar in concept to the Paris Air Show. Homestead Air Reserve Base had previously been considered, but the idea had been rejected by the US military.

== See also ==
- List of airports in Florida
