= Environment of Florida =

Overview of the environment of the U.S. state of Florida

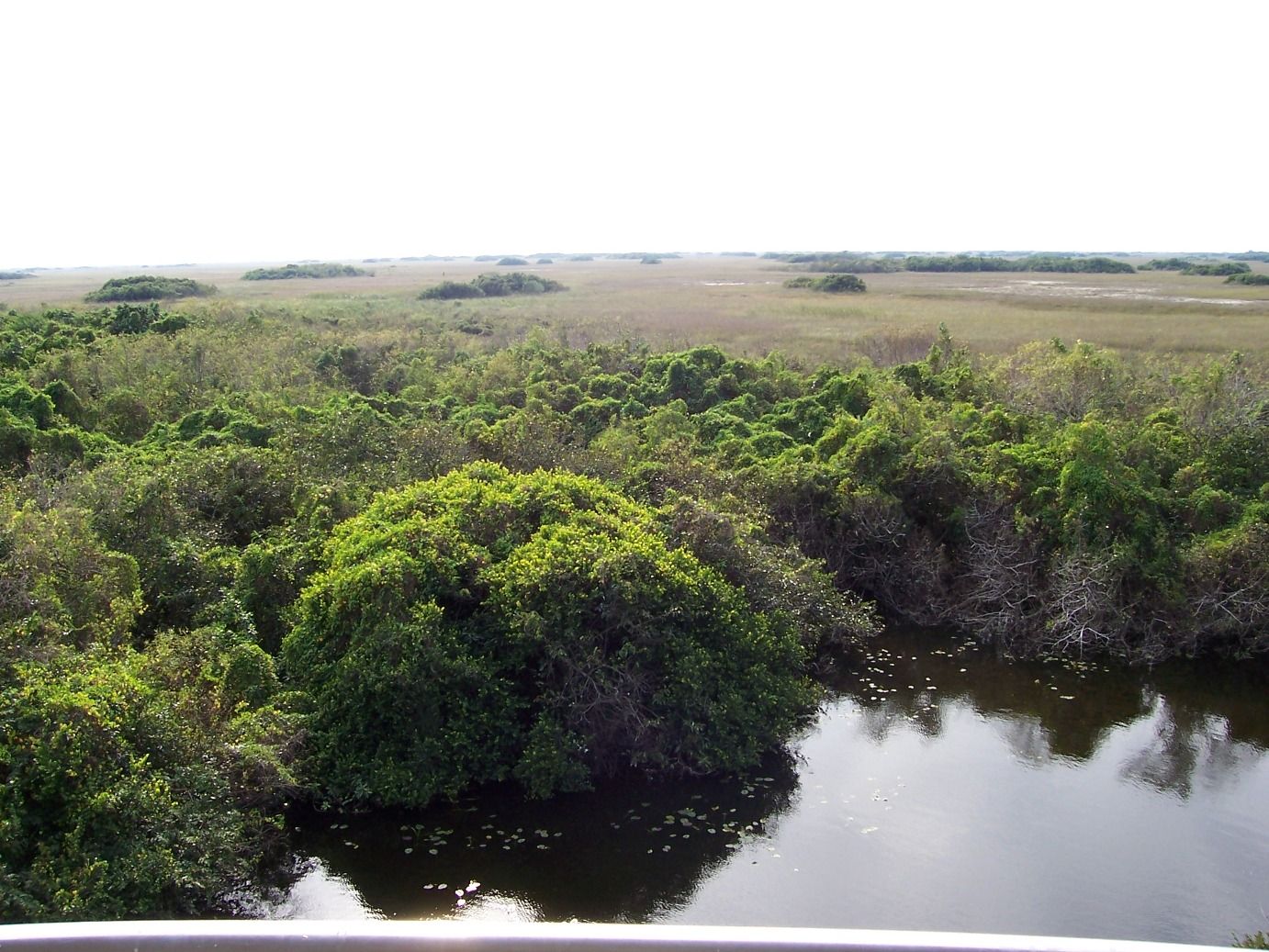
Everglades National Park

The environment of Florida in the United States yields an array of land and marine life in a mild subtropical climate. This environment has drawn millions of people to settle in the once rural state over the last hundred years. Florida's population increases by about 1,000 residents each day. Land development and water use have transformed the state, primarily through drainage and infill of the wetlands that once covered most of the peninsula.

Much of Florida consists of karst limestone veined with water-filled caves and sinkholes, which provide homes to many species of aquatic life, some unique to particular Florida locations. As urban and suburban development have increased over the last decades, demand for groundwater has also risen, resulting in damage and drying out of portions of the cave system. This has led to ground subsidence as dry caves collapse, threatening property as well as ecosystems.

Restoration of the Everglades has long been recognized as an environmental priority in the state. In 2000, Congress passed the Comprehensive Everglades Restoration Plan, a $7.8 billion, 30-year project aimed at preservation and restoration of the region and its unique combination of environments.

By 2018, 30% of the land area of the state was in conservation.

== History ==
=== Population growth and development ===
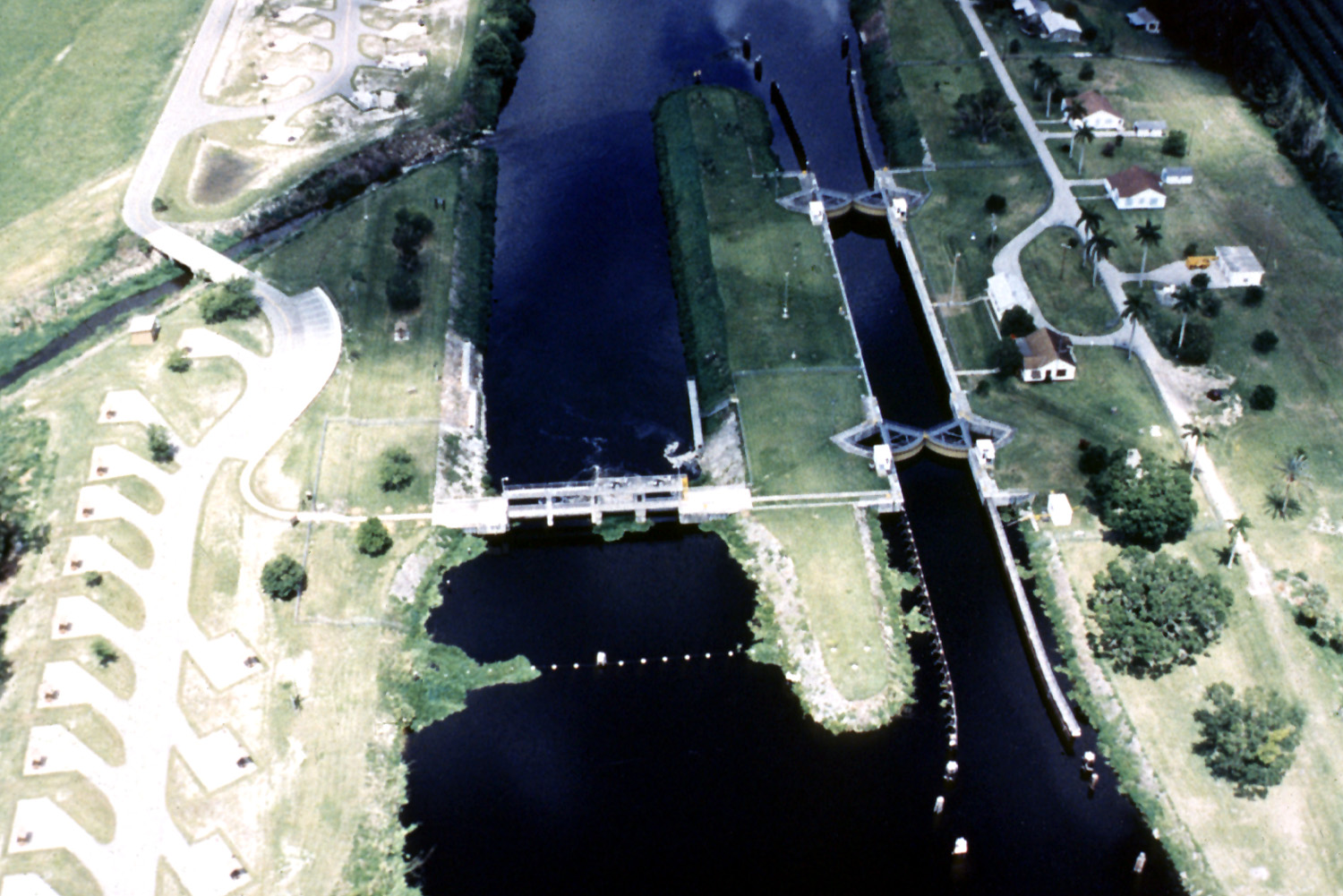
Ortona Lock and Dam, on the Caloosahatchee River, part of the Okeechobee Waterway, in Glades County, Florida, a part of the Army Corps of Engineers project to control water flow in the Everglades.

The 1900 United States Census identified only four cities in the state of Florida with more than 5,000 inhabitants: Jacksonville, Pensacola, Key West, and Tampa. The total population of the state was recorded as 528,542. The southern third of the state was sparsely populated, and much of it was partially submerged marshlands. A few attempts at diverting the flow of water from Lake Okeechobee to the land to the south had occurred as early as the 1880s, but it was not until the election of Governor Napoleon B. Broward in 1904 that any significant drainage occurred. Broward had campaigned on a platform that included draining the Everglades and selling off the resulting land. Beginning in 1906, and continuing until 1913, over 225 miles (360 km) of canals were dug, creating the Miami Canal, the North New River Canal, and the South New River Canal. An even more ambitious and expansive program followed, resulting in the construction of six large drainage canals and numerous smaller canals, totaling 440 miles (710 km); 47 miles (76 km) of levees; and 16 locks and dams over a 14-year period, from 1913-1927. As land was reclaimed from the Everglades, farmers moved in. Vast farming areas sprang up in southeastern Florida and the northern Everglades. Development was further spurred by the Florida land boom of the 1920s, during which a speculative wave resulted in a frenzy of planning, land redevelopment, and construction. This continued until 1926, when the bubble burst. Between 1926 and the beginning of World War II, growth in the state was slow and relatively stable.

As World War II came to an end, thousands of people moved to Florida, bringing about a sharp population increase. The state's population in 1940 was 1,897,414; in 1950, it was 2,771,305, an increase of 46.1 percent. The Tampa Bay area and South Florida were the biggest-growth areas, although almost all of the coastal areas along the peninsula saw strong growth.

By 1945, a prolonged drought in Florida spotlighted the first signs of the consequences of altering the environment. Saltwater intrusion became an issue in wells in the southern part of the state, and large wildfires consumed parcels of farmland, destroying the peat which had made the land so fertile. Prior to instituting controlled burns, the state forests and pastures burned for months during the dry season. From the 1940s to the 1970s, the state and federal government assumed control of burning that prevented uncontrolled fires. In 2010, the state burned a record 2,600,000 acres (11,000 km^{2}).

Extensive flooding in 1947, during which 90 percent of the state south of Orlando was underwater, made it clear that the current drainage projects were not beneficial to the environment, to farmers, or to the developing cities. 1947 was also the year that Everglades National Park was dedicated, and the year in which Marjory Stoneman Douglas published The Everglades: River of Grass, which warned of the damage that had occurred to the fragile ecosystem. The following year, the state of Florida created the agency which eventually became the South Florida Water Management District, responsible for water quality, flood control, water supply and environmental restoration in 16 counties, from Orlando to the Florida Keys.

To control flooding, the Kissimmee River was straightened from 1962 to 1970. While the project delivered on the promise of flood protection, it also destroyed much of a floodplain-dependent ecosystem that nurtured threatened and endangered species, as well as hundreds of other native fish and wetland-dependent animals. More than 90 percent of the waterfowl that once graced the wetlands disappeared and the number of bald eagle nesting territories decreased by 70 percent. After the waterway was transformed into a straight, deep canal, it became oxygen-depleted and the fish community it supported changed dramatically.

During the 1960s and 1970s, continued growth along both coasts of the state and along Interstate 4 increased the strain on the ecosystems of the state. Portions of Big Cypress Swamp were drained for development, until the creation of Big Cypress National Preserve in 1974. Additional acreage was added to Everglades National Park in 1989. In 2000, Congress passed a federal effort to restore the Everglades, named the Comprehensive Everglades Restoration Plan (CERP), with the objectives of "restoration, preservation and protection of the south Florida ecosystem while providing for other water-related needs of the region." and claiming to be the largest environmental restoration in history. The plan involves cooperation between the federal government, state, and local governments, and encompasses 18,000 square miles (47,000 km^{2}) in 16 counties. It is estimated that completion of the program will take 30 years, at an approximate cost of $7.8 Billion.

As the Southeast Florida area approached buildout, growth shifted to more rural areas in central and north Florida. Between 2000 and 2006, Flagler County was the fastest growing county in the nation, and both Osceola County and St. Johns County were among the 25 fastest growing; Flagler County was identified as a Metropolitan Statistical Area on 18 December 2006. The sharp growth in Flagler County (and neighboring St. Johns County) has had a negative impact on the Guana Tolomato Matanzas National Estuarine Research Reserve, endangers wildlife such as manatees and bears, and threatens the water supply for the region.

== Resources ==
=== Water ===
Florida obtains much of its drinking water from the Floridan Aquifer and the Biscayne Aquifer, as well as from surface water from Lake Okeechobee and other lakes, but population increases have begun to strain available sources. The state has built 120 desalination plants, more than three times as many as any other state, including the largest plant in the United States. Additionally, an electrodialysis reversal plant in Sarasota is the largest of its type in the world, and a nanofiltration plant in Boca Raton is the largest of its type in the Western Hemisphere.

=== Energy ===
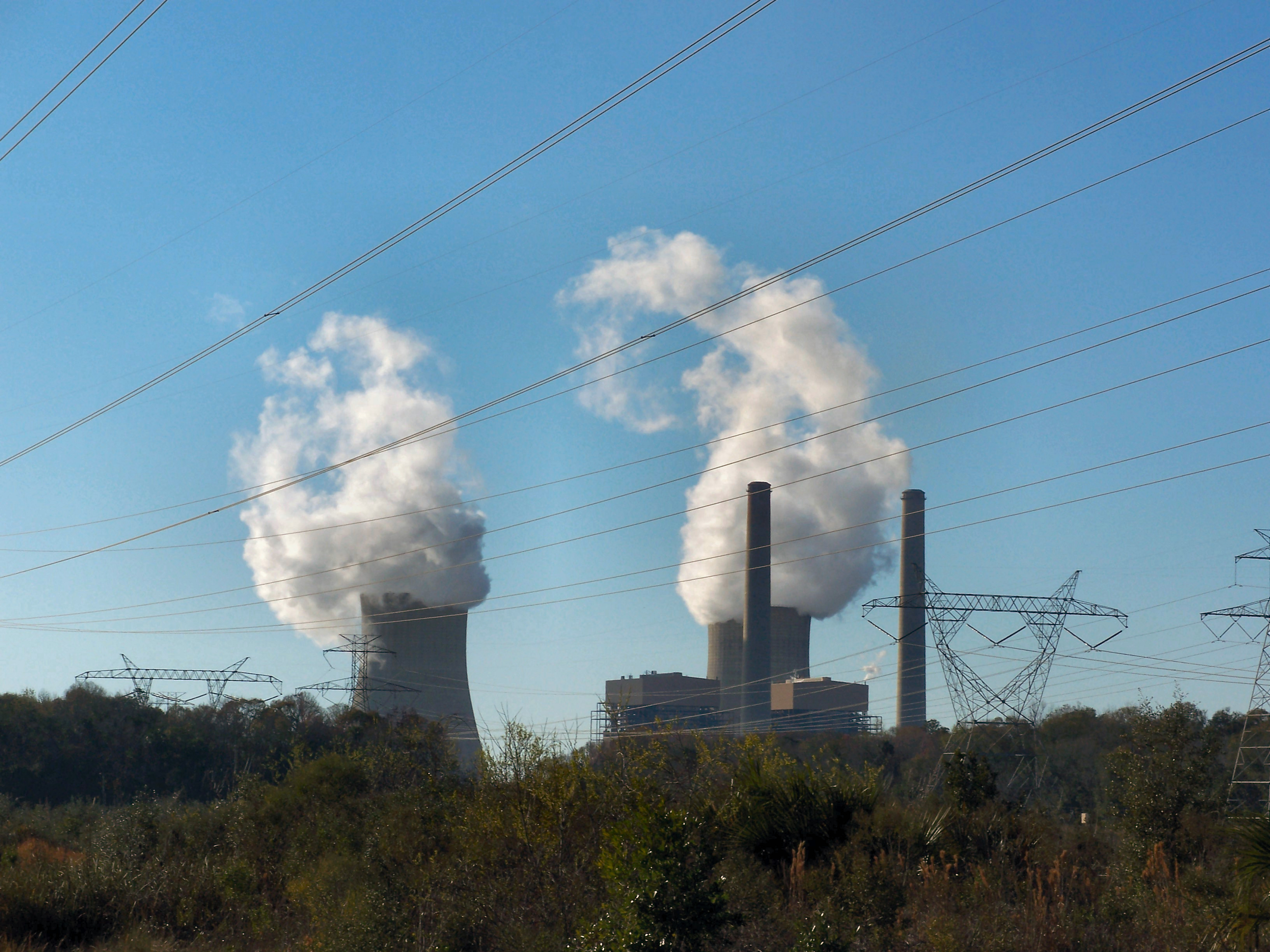
Crystal River North steam complex, in Crystal River, Florida

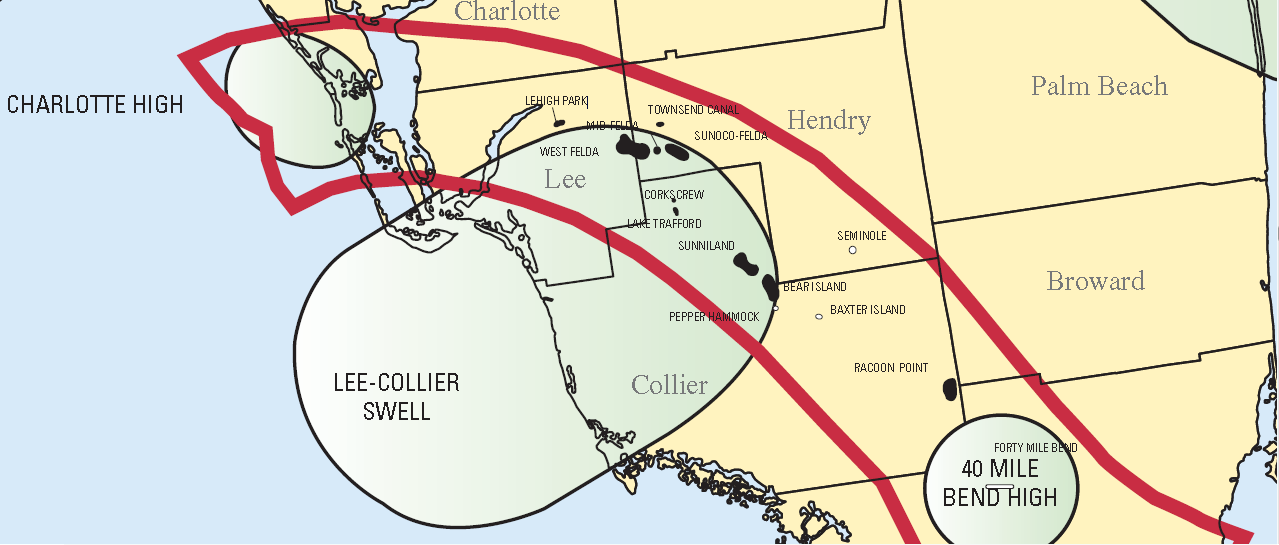
Sunniland Oil Fields

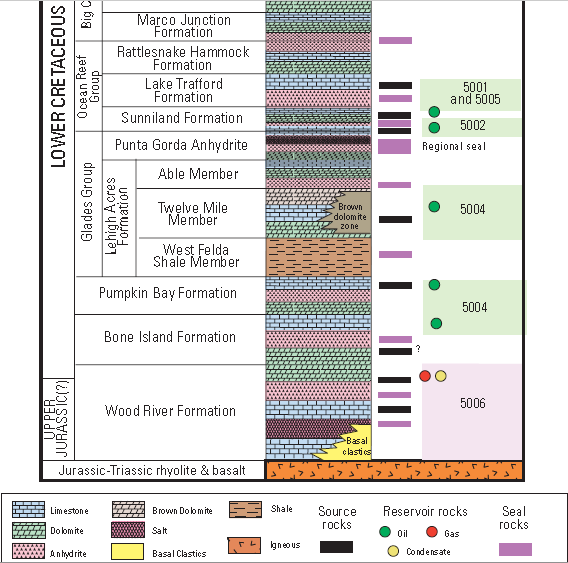
Sunniland stratigraphic column

In a 2023 ranking of energy consumption per capita among U.S. states, Florida ranked forty-sixth. This includes residential, commercial, industrial, and transportation sectors. It is estimated that approximately 4 percent of energy in the state is generated through renewable resources. Florida's energy production is 6.0% of the nation's total energy output, while total production of pollutants is lower, with figures of 5.6 percent for nitrogen oxide, 5.1 percent for carbon dioxide, and 3.5 percent for sulfur dioxide.

In July 2007, Florida Governor Charlie Crist announced plans to sign executive orders that would impose strict new air-pollution standards in the state, with aims to reduce greenhouse-gas emissions by 80 percent of 1990 levels by 2050. Crist's orders would set new emissions targets for power companies, automobiles and trucks, and toughen conservation goals for state agencies and require state-owned vehicles to use alternative fuels. Governor Charlie Crist and both of Florida's senators, Bill Nelson and Mel Martinez, oppose offshore drilling and exploration. Former governor Jeb Bush, originally opposed to all drilling, changed his position on a bill introduced into the House of Representatives in 2005, which would allow unrestricted drilling 125 miles (201 km) or more from the coast. Martinez, Nelson, and Crist opposed that bill, but Martinez and Nelson voted for a Senate alternative which prohibited drilling within 125 miles (201 km) of the Panhandle coast, and 235 miles (378 km) of the peninsular coast.

In 2006, the state enacted "Farm to Fuel" initiative, an effort to increase production of renewable energy from crops, agricultural wastes and residues produced in the state of Florida. On 22 January 2008, Florida's Agriculture and Consumer Services Commissioner announced funding for four commercial ethanol and biodiesel production facilities, and an additional eight demonstration and research projects.

=== Oil and Gas Exploration ===
There are two oil-producing areas in Florida. One is in South Florida, with 14 fields, and the other is in the western panhandle, with seven fields. The South Florida fields are located in Lee, Hendry, and Collier county. Florida's first oil field, the Sunniland field, in Collier County, was discovered in 1943. It has since produced over 18 million barrels of oil. Subsequently, 13 more field discoveries were found. Although these fields are relatively small, production is significant. Together, the three Felda fields (West Felda, Mid-Felda, and Sunoco Felda) in Hendry County have produced over 54 million barrels of oil. Cumulative production from the Sunniland Formation through July 1993 was 103 million barrels (16.4 million cubic metres) of oil.

Production in the western panhandle began with the discovery of the Jay field in June 1970. Jay is the most significant oil field discovered in the United States since the discovery on the Alaskan North Slope of the giant Prudhoe Bay field in 1968. Another significant discovery in the area, during the same period, was the Blackjack Creek field. Production is from the Jurassic Smackover Formation.

Since then, an additional six oil fields have been discovered in the western panhandle of Florida. North Florida has dominated Florida oil production since the discovery of the Jay field. North Florida oil fields account for 83 percent of the state's cumulative production, with the Jay field alone responsible for 71 percent of the state's cumulative production.

It is believed that significant energy resources are located off of Florida's western coast in the Gulf of Mexico, but that region has been closed to exploration since 1981.

== Waste Management ==
Increasing landfill space is also an issue. St. Lucie County is planning to experiment with burning trash through plasma arc gasification to generate energy and reduce landfill space. The experiment will be the largest of its kind in the world to date, and begin operation no later than 2009. If successful, experts estimate that the entire St. Lucie County landfill, estimated to contain 4.3 million tons of trash, will disappear within 18 years. Materials created in the energy production can also be used in road construction.

=== Recycling ===
The recycling rate in Florida is estimated at 28% in 2000. The county with the highest recycling rate is Lee County, with a 43% recycling rate as of 2008.

Florida's Energy, Climate Change, and Economic Security Act of 2008 set a goal of progressively improving recycling to reach a 75 percent rate by the year 2020. It directs public entities (schools, state and local public agencies) to report the amount they recycle annually to their counties. Private businesses are encouraged (but not mandated) to report the amount they recycle to their counties. Finally, the section directs FDEP to create the Recycling Business Assistance Center. Under the new law, each county must implement a recyclable materials recycling program that shall have a goal of recycling recyclable solid waste by 40 percent by December 31, 2012, 50 percent by 2014, 60 percent by 2016, 70 percent by 2018, and 75 percent by 2020.

== Parks and beaches ==
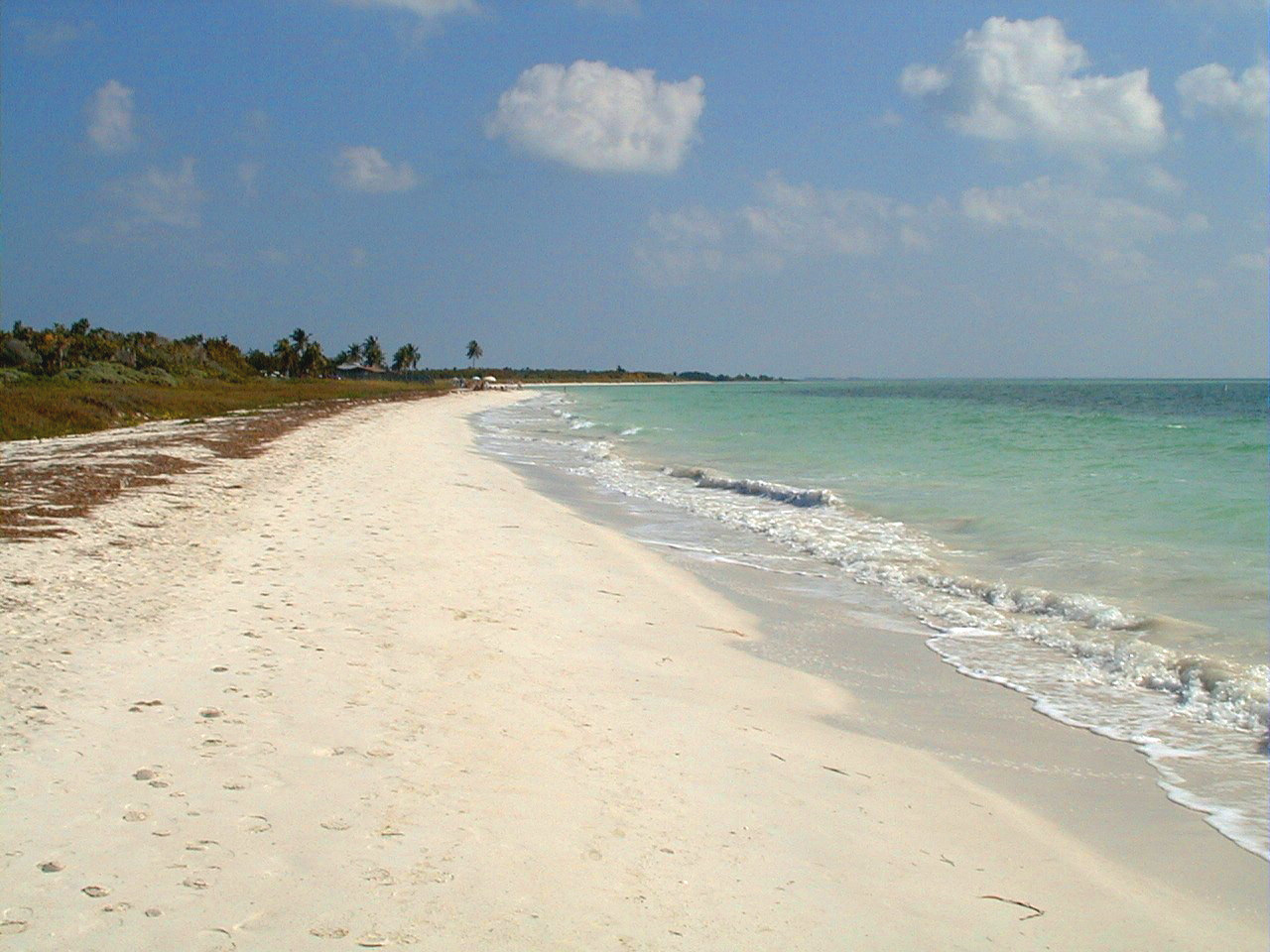
The beach at Bahia Honda in the Florida Keys

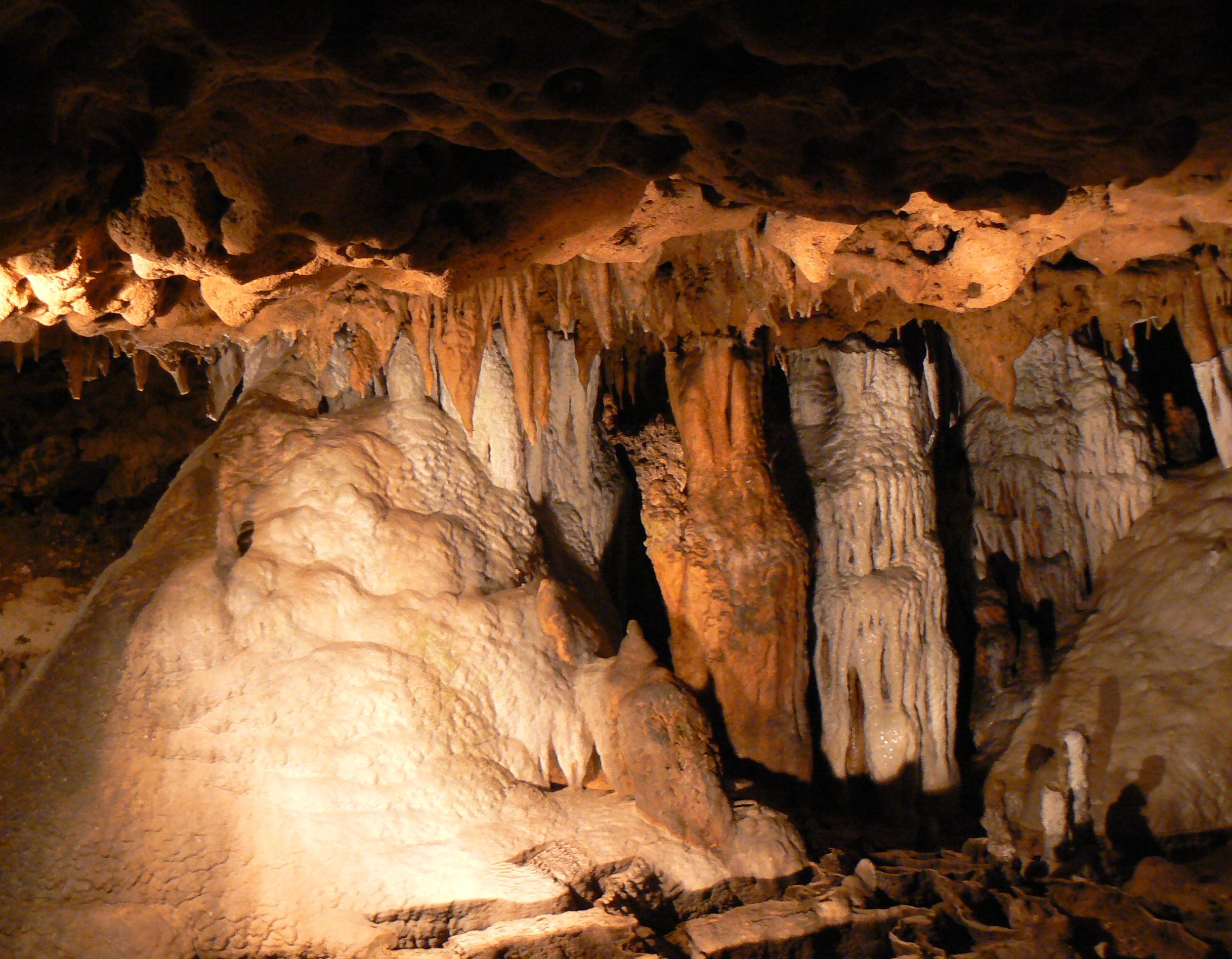
Caverns at Florida Caverns State Park

In 2017 about half of the state's sandy beaches were eroding. About half of these were covered by a beach project.

Areas under control of the National Park Service include:

- Big Cypress National Preserve, near Lake Okeechobee
- Biscayne National Park, in Miami-Dade County south of Miami
- Canaveral National Seashore, near Titusville
- Castillo de San Marcos National Monument, in St. Augustine
- De Soto National Memorial, in Bradenton
- Dry Tortugas National Park, at Key West
- Everglades National Park in Southern Florida
- Fort Caroline National Memorial, at Jacksonville
- Fort Matanzas National Monument, in St. Augustine
- Gulf Islands National Seashore, near Gulf Breeze
- Timucuan Ecological and Historic Preserve, in Jacksonville

Areas under the control of the USDA United States Forest Service include:

- Apalachicola National Forest along the east bank of the Apalachicola River,
- Choctawhatchee National Forest near Niceville,
- Ocala National Forest in Central Florida, and
- Osceola National Forest in Northeast Florida.

The National Oceanic and Atmospheric Administration's National Ocean Service is responsible for one sanctuary:

- Florida Keys National Marine Sanctuary

== Biodiversity ==
Florida is a biodiverse state, with over three thousand native vascular plants and 1,500 vertebrates, a higher number than all but three other states. A 2003 United Nations Food and Agriculture Organization study stated that the Florida Straits had the highest biodiversity in the Atlantic Ocean, and was home to 25 endemic species.

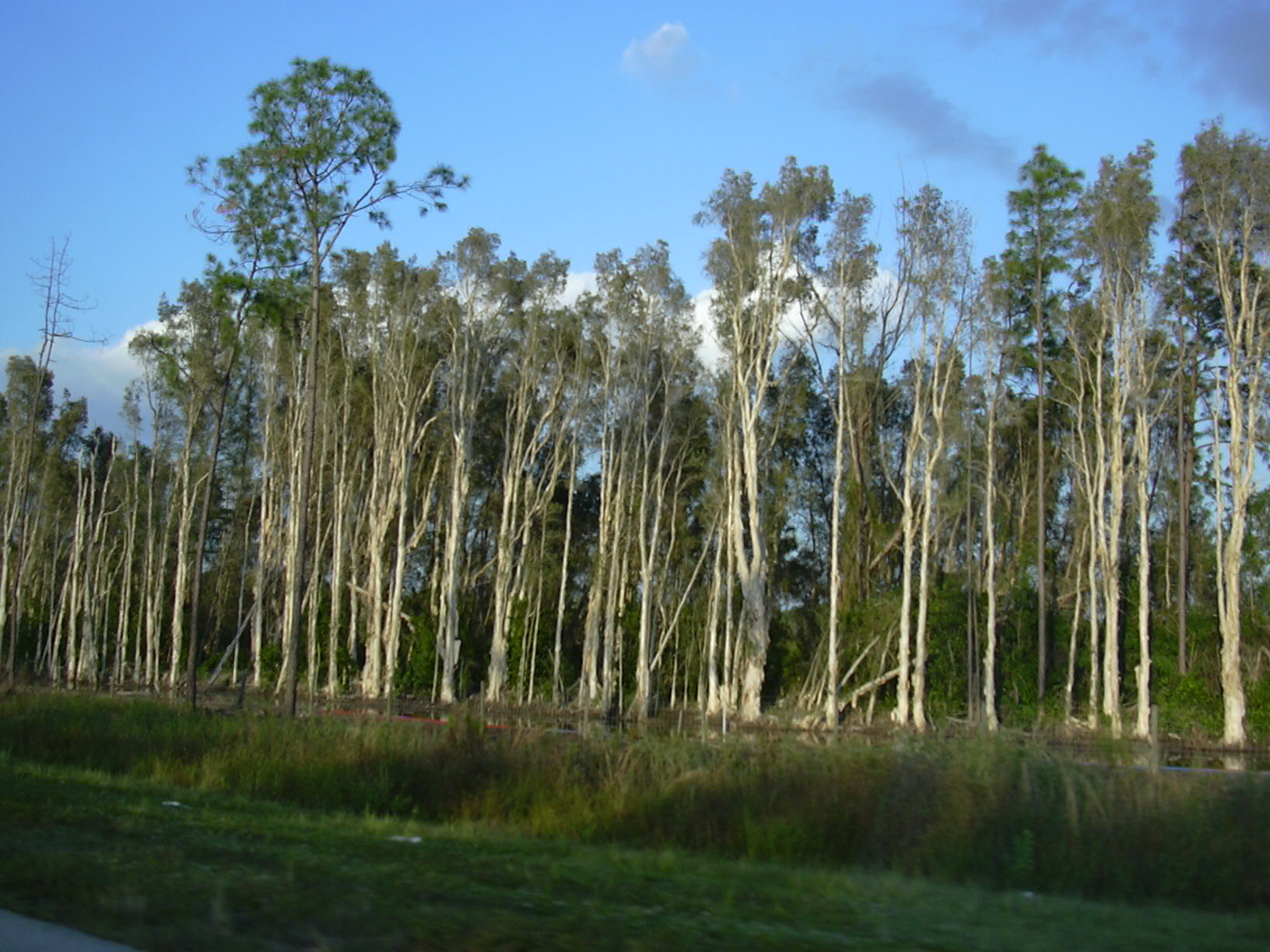
Stand of Melaleuca in the Everglades

=== Flora ===
Florida has between 3,200 and 3,500 native plant species. Of those, 230 species are endemic to Florida. Florida has a very high species richness per unit area.

=== Fauna ===
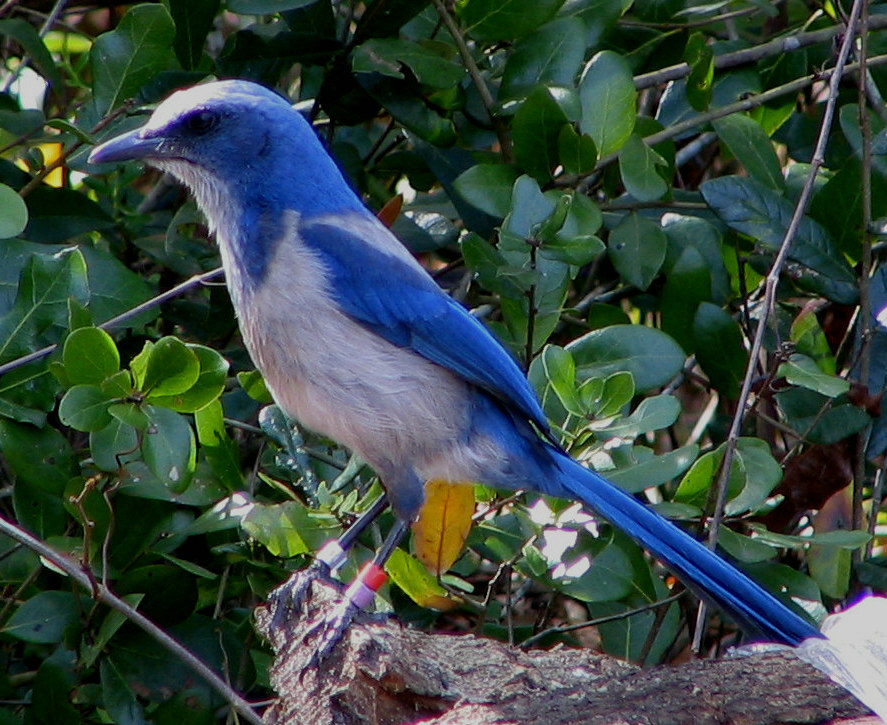
The Florida scrub jay is found only in Florida.

Endemic species in Florida include the Florida scrub jay (Aphelocoma coerulescens), Miami blue (Cyclargus thomasi bethunebakeri), Okaloosa darter (Etheostoma okaloosae), and Key deer (Odocoileus virginianus clavium).

Florida is a popular destination for birdwatching, because of the many species that can be found in the state at various times of the year. The Florida Ornithological Society maintains the official state list of the birds of Florida, which currently contains 498 species. A study published in 2003 by the Florida Fish and Wildlife Conservation Commission documented 196 species of birds which were confirmed to breed in the state, with an additional 19 species listed as possible or probable breeders. The Great Florida Birding Trail, a 2000-mile (3200 km) long trail, is composed of 489 locations throughout the state which are optimal observation sites.

Sport fishing is also popular in Florida; over 250 different species of fish (including 73 non-native species) can be found in Florida. There are more than 1000 species of fish in Florida's inshore waters.

In 2010, NOAA, citing the Magnuson-Stevens Act, banned fishing of red snapper until the population has time to recover.

Florida's Atlantic coast is home to the only extensive coral reefs in the continental United States, and the third largest in the world. The entire reef system in the Florida Keys is encompassed by the Florida Keys National Marine Sanctuary, and significant portions of reef are protected as part of Biscayne National Park.

In 1977, the federal government placed alligators on the endangered list. They were removed from the endangered list in 1987 and Florida permitted selective hunting in 1988.

==== Bird and turtle habitats ====
In 1987, Florida hosted the last member of the dusky seaside sparrow, now extinct. There have now been 14 such avian failures since listing of endangered species began in 1973.

The Florida scrub jay has been thought to be threatened for many years, because the species is territorial and cannot move to better grounds when its habitat is jeopardized.

Nesting beaches of loggerhead sea turtles are protected.

== Environmental issues ==
There are a number of environmental issues in Florida. A large portion of the state is a biologically diverse ecosystem, including the vast wetlands of the Everglades. The management of environmental issues related to the Everglades, as well as the coastal waters and wetlands, has been an important part of the history of Florida and has influenced the development of multiple sectors of its economy, including the agricultural industry. This biodiversity makes Florida's ecosystem particularly vulnerable to invasive species and human activities like pollution.

Due to its low elevation, Florida has been described as "ground zero" for climate change in the United States.

=== Invasive species ===
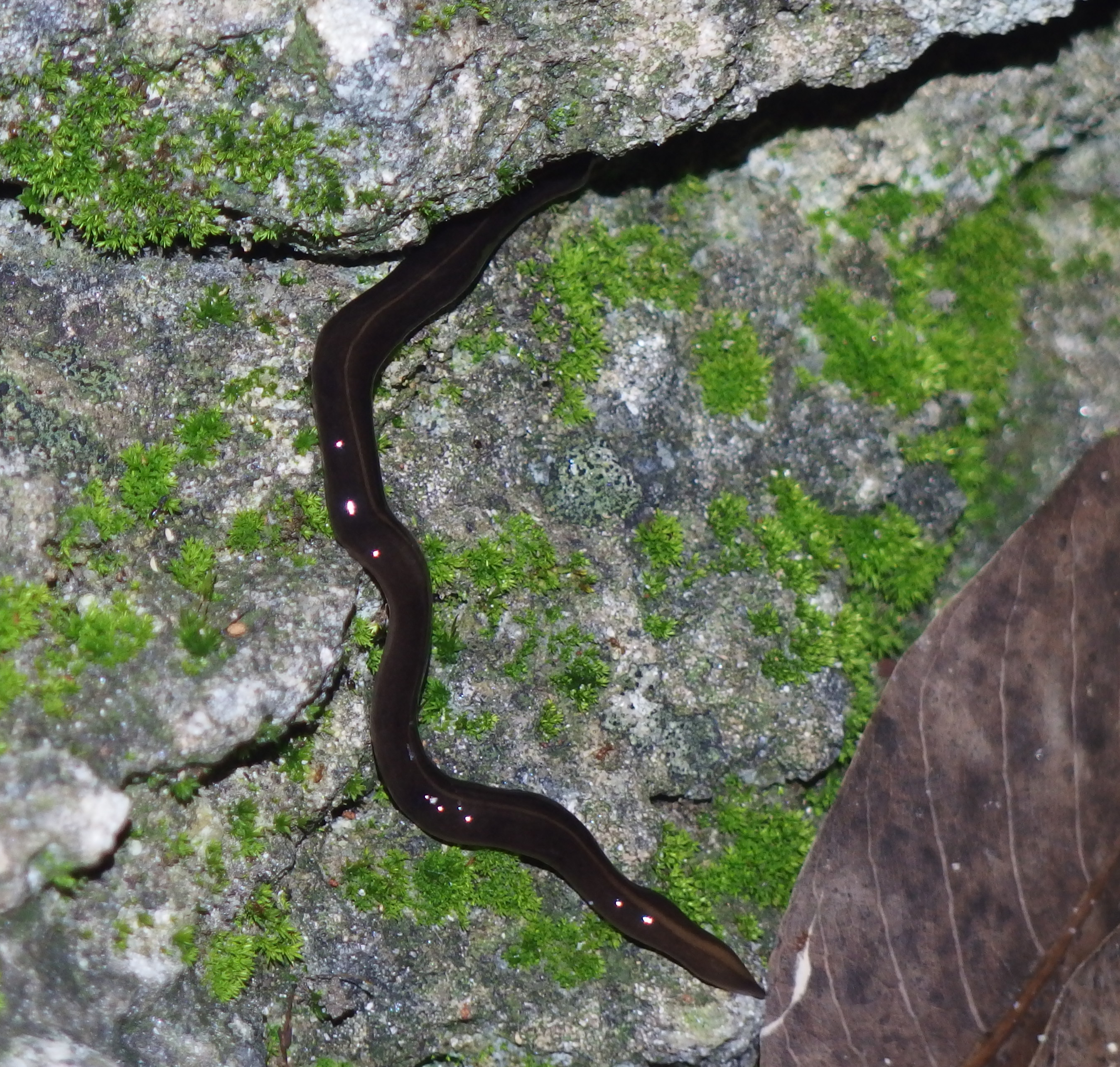
Platydemus manokwari in Florida

Invasive species are more of a threat to Florida than any other state. This is due to Florida's mild climate, a robust reptile trade, and the fact that it serves as the point of entry for most of the plants imported into the United States.

Native flora is threatened by various invasive plants, including the Brazilian pepper (Schinus terebinthifolius). Possession and cultivation of this tree is illegal. Large numbers of volunteers periodically cut down these invaders, particularly along waterways. The Australian pine (Casuarina spp.) is being actively controlled to prevent it from spreading.

The redbay ambrosia beetle (Xyleborus glabratus), native to Asia, threatens the local avocado industry and redbay trees (Persea borbonia).

It is illegal to import giant African land snails (Achatina fulica) (GALS) into the United States. These snails threaten buildings, 500 types of local plants, and carry meningitis. In southeastern Florida, this species became established and was then eradicated on two separate occasions as of June 2023.

In 2015, the land flatworm Platydemus manokwari was reported from Miami. It is a highly invasive species and, as a predator of snails, a threat to biodiversity.

=== Harmful algal bloom ===
Harmful algal bloom (HAB) is a natural occurrence of a higher than usual concentration of microscopic algae in water. Commonly referred to as red tide, this over abundance of algae kills fish and other marine animals as well as birds. Consuming contaminated shellfish results in neurotoxic shellfish poisoning and airborne toxins can cause respiratory irritation. Although red tide is a natural event that occurs most years from late summer to early fall, there is evidence that nitrogen pollution can contribute to the duration of these occurrences. HABs originate in high salinity water about 11 to 46 miles offshore. Although there are many different species that can cause HABs, they most commonly consist of Karenia brevis. These blooms can cost millions of dollars in fisheries closures, lost tourism dollars, hospital visits, and cleanup efforts.

=== Climate change ===
The effects of climate change in Florida are attributable to man-made increases in atmospheric carbon dioxide. Floridians are experiencing increased flooding due to sea level rise, and are concerned about the possibility of more frequent or more intense hurricanes.

The state has been described as America's "ground zero" for climate change, global warming and sea level rise, because "the majority of its population and economy is concentrated along low-elevation oceanfront."

Florida residents think climate change is happening at higher rates than the national average. As of March 2025, 88% of Floridians believe climate change is happening, with 55% believing it to be attributable to human activities. However, the state remains politically divided, with 74% of Democrats and 40% of Republicans agreeing with the scientific consensus that climate change is anthropogenic. Some communities in Florida have begun implementing climate change mitigation approaches; however, statewide initiatives have been hampered by the politicization of climate change in the United States, focusing on resilience rather than full scale mitigation and adaptation.

== See also ==
- Environmental issues in Florida
- Climate change in Florida
- Florida Department of Environmental Protection
- Florida Department of Agriculture and Consumer Services
- Geography and ecology of the Everglades
- Restoration of the Everglades
- List of Superfund sites in Florida
- Water's Journey: The Hidden Rivers of Florida, a documentary about the aquifers in Florida
- Wildlife regulations in Florida
- Florida Wildlife Corridor
- Florida Fish and Wildlife Conservation Commission
