= Okaloosa =

Okaloosa may refer to:

- Okaloosa Island
- Okaloosa County, Florida

See also

- Okaloosa darter
- Okaloosa-Walton College
- Okaloosa Regional Airport
