= Polluter pays amendment =

Polluter pays amendment was passed negating the "polluter pays" provision of the Florida Constitution in 2003. The original provision required those in the Everglades Agricultural Area (EAA) who cause water pollution to be responsible for paying the costs of that pollution's abatement. The Supreme Court concluded that the provision requires "implementing legislation"; the Legislature has not adopted statutes implementing the provision, instead forcing taxpayers to pay 66% of the costs of dealing with contamination in the Everglades.

A study commissioned by the Everglades Foundation found that the agricultural industry is responsible for 76 percent of phosphorus contamination in the Everglades (the rest being urban runoff and wastewater), yet pays only 24 percent of the cost of dealing with it. This is despite Florida's polluter-pays amendment requiring the polluters themselves to be "primarily responsible" for cleanup of the wetlands.

== History ==
The Everglades Forever Act was passed in 1994 as an effort to restore the state's struggling wetlands. In 1996, nearly 70% of Floridians voted to approve the polluter pays amendment to the Constitution. The amendment stated: "Those in the Everglades Agricultural Area who cause water pollution within the Everglades Protection Area or the Everglades Agricultural Area shall be primarily responsible for paying the costs of the abatement of that pollution." Sugar farming occurs on approximately 450,000 acres of the EAA.

Florida's attorney general Robert A. Butterworth stated in 1996 that "while the Legislature may enact provisions implementing Amendment #5, the amendment itself establishes an obligation on polluters of the Everglades to pay the costs of abating such pollution irrespective of legislative action". However, in 2003, the Supreme Court deemed the provision "not self-executing and required implementing legislation". No such legislation has been implemented.
