= Polluter pays principle =

Principle in environmental law

In environmental law, the polluter pays principle is enacted to make the party responsible for producing pollution responsible for paying for the damage done to the natural environment. This principle has also been used to put the costs of pollution prevention on the polluter. It is regarded as a regional custom because of the strong support it has received in most Organisation for Economic Co-operation and Development (OECD) and European Union countries, and has a strong scientific basis in economics. It is a fundamental principle in US environmental law.

== Historical basis ==
According to the French historian of the environment Jean-Baptiste Fressoz, financial compensation (not named "polluter pays principle" at that time) is already the regulation principle of pollution favoured by industrials in the nineteenth century. He wrote that: "This principle, which is now offered as a new solution, actually accompanied the process of industrialisation, and was intended by the manufacturers themselves."

In modern times, the continued adherence to the polluter pays principle is supported scientifically by economics. One condition that must be satisfied in order to maximise Pareto efficiency is the assignment of all costs of a decision, such as the harm resulting from a decision to pollute, to the agent making the decision, effectively removing all externalities.

== Applications in environmental law ==
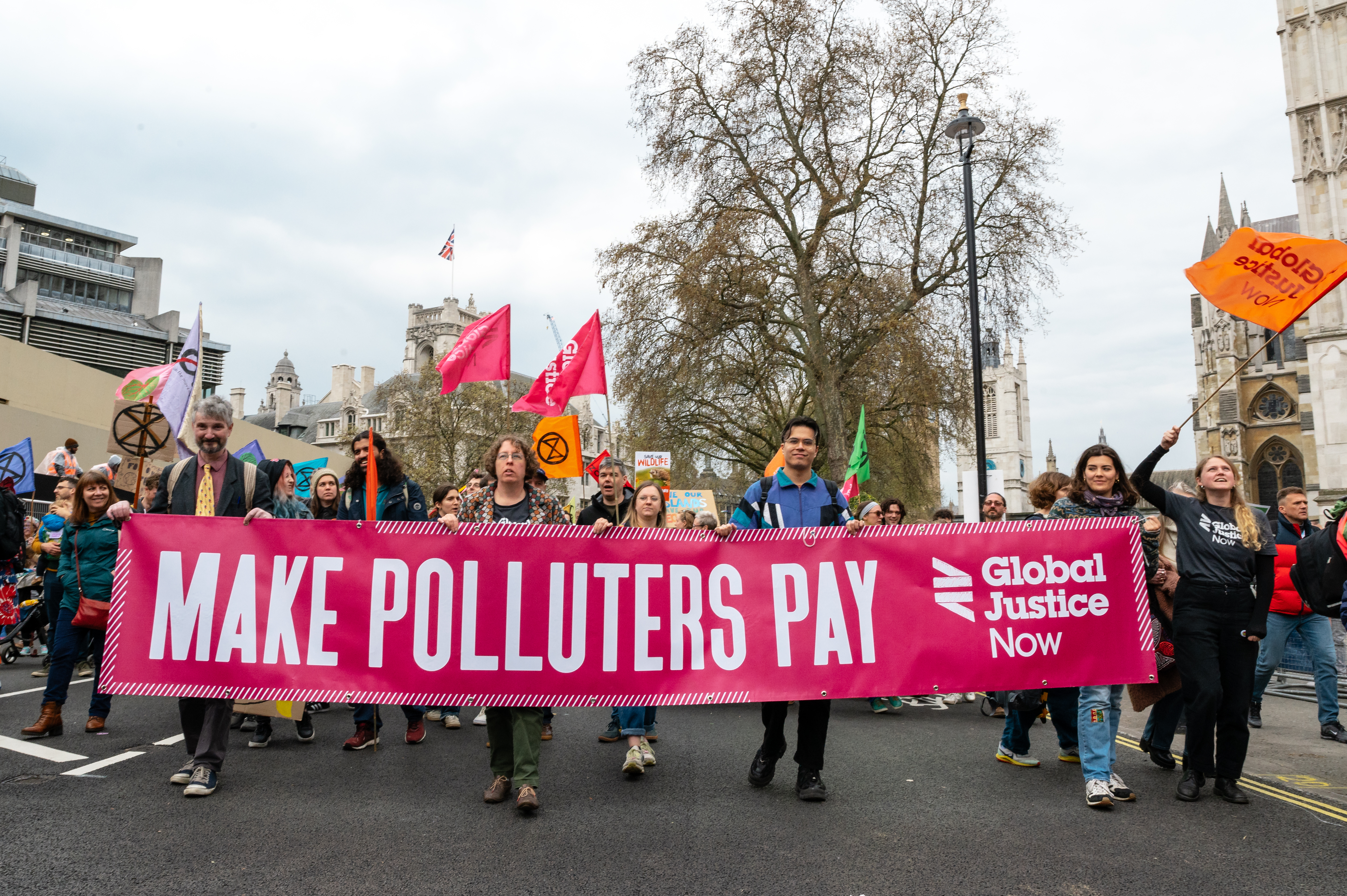
Banner "Make polluters pay" at a climate demonstration (United Kingdom, 2023).

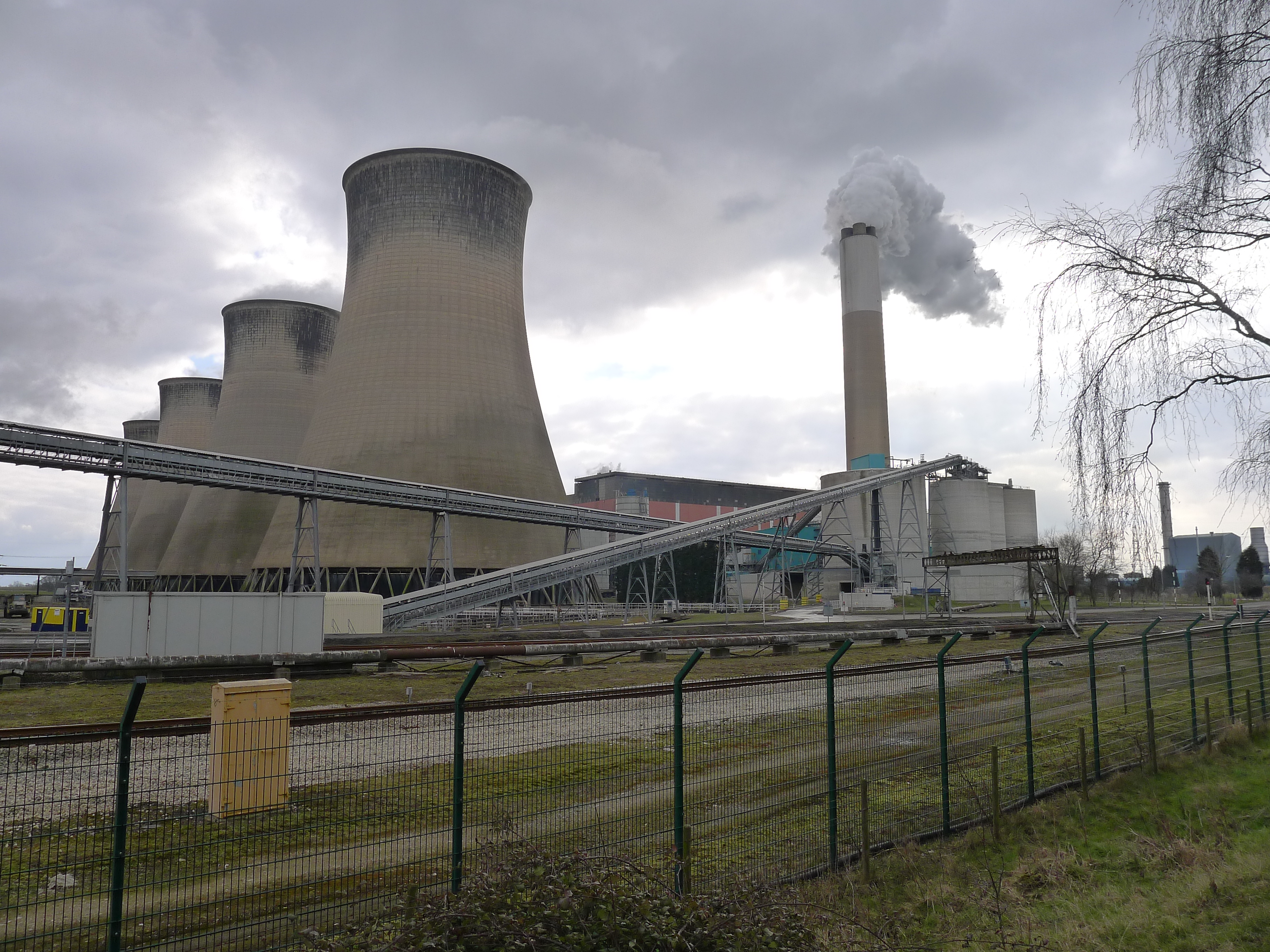
An ecotax allows governments to better manage the pollution caused directly or indirectly by industry.

The polluter pays principle underpins environmental policy such as an ecotax, which, if enacted by government, deters and essentially reduces greenhouse gas emissions. This principle is based on the fact that as much as pollution is unavoidable, the person or industry that is responsible for the pollution must pay some money for the rehabilitation of the polluted environment.

=== Australia ===
The state of New South Wales in Australia has included the polluter pay principle with the other principles of ecologically sustainable development in the objectives of the Environment Protection Authority.

=== Canada ===
The Canadian Energy Regulator mandates that oil companies must pay for any environmental impacts from a spill. This mandate requires oil companies to pay for damages, regardless of whether or not the spill is their fault.

=== European Union ===
The polluter pays principle is set out in the Treaty on the Functioning of the European Union and Directive 2004/35/EC of the European Parliament and of the Council of 21 April 2004 on environmental liability with regard to the prevention and remedying of environmental damage is based on this principle. The directive entered into force on 30 April 2004; member states were allowed three years to transpose the directive into their domestic law and by July 2010 all member states had completed this.

=== France ===
In France, the Charter for the Environment contains a formulation of the polluter pays principle (article 4):

Everyone shall be required, in the conditions provided for by law, to contribute to the making good of any damage he or she may have caused to the environment.

=== Ghana ===
In Ghana, the polluter pays principle was adopted in 2011.

=== Sweden ===
The polluter pays principle is also known as extended producer responsibility (EPR). This is a concept that was probably first described by Thomas Lindhqvist for the Swedish government in 1990. EPR seeks to shift the responsibility of dealing with waste from governments (and thus, taxpayers and society at large) to the entities producing it. In effect, it internalised the cost of waste disposal into the cost of the product, theoretically meaning that the producers will improve the waste profile of their products, thus decreasing waste and increasing possibilities for reuse and recycling.

The Organisation for Economic Co-operation and Development defines extended producer responsibility as:

a concept where manufacturers and importers of products should bear a significant degree of responsibility for the environmental impacts of their products throughout the product life-cycle, including upstream impacts inherent in the selection of materials for the products, impacts from manufacturers’ production process itself, and downstream impacts from the use and disposal of the products. Producers accept their responsibility when designing their products to minimise life-cycle environmental impacts, and when accepting legal, physical or socio-economic responsibility for environmental impacts that cannot be eliminated by design.

=== United Kingdom ===
Part IIA of the Environmental Protection Act 1990 established the operation of the polluter pays principle. This was further built upon by The Environmental Damage (Prevention and Remediation) Regulations 2009 (for England) and the Environmental Damage (Prevention and Remediation) (Wales) Regulations 2009 (for Wales).

=== United States ===
The principle is employed in all of the major US pollution control laws: Clean Air Act, Clean Water Act, Resource Conservation and Recovery Act (solid waste and hazardous waste management), and Superfund (cleanup of abandoned waste sites).

Some eco-taxes underpinned by the polluter pays principle include:

- the Gas Guzzler Tax for motor vehicles
- Corporate Average Fuel Economy (CAFE), a "polluter pays" fine.
- the Superfund law requires polluters to pay for cleanup of hazardous waste sites, when the polluters can be identified.

==== Climate Superfund ====
Using the federal superfund for waste clean-up as a framework, Vermont enacted the Climate Superfund Act. New York enacted a similar statute the same year. Generally, Climate Superfunds require companies that have caused high pollution, and have some physical or economic connection to the state, will be charged for clean-up costs and damage caused by climate change within the state, and to fund climate change resiliency measures in the state.

===== Challenges =====
In 2025, 22 states, led by West Virginia, sued to block the Climate Superfund program in New York. On August 31, 2026, the United States District Court for the Northern District of New York made a decision in the case, striking down the law. The Court found that New York was unable to enact climate legislation because it was preempted by the Clean Air Act. Another claim arguing the law was preempted under federal common law was not ruled on.

In May 2025, as part of the policy of the second Trump administration the Department of Justice filed lawsuits against New York and Vermont challenging the climate superfund programs in New York and Vermont.

==== Limitations of polluter pays principle ====
The US Environmental Protection Agency (EPA) has observed that the polluter pays principle has typically not been fully implemented in US laws and programs. For example, drinking water and sewage treatment services are subsidized and there are limited mechanisms in place to fully assess polluters for treatment costs. However, in nearly all American jurisdictions, trespass and nuisance actions may be brought against alleged polluters where the contamination event is substantial, recent, or ongoing, and where natural resources or real property have been damaged.

=== Zimbabwe ===
The Zimbabwe Environmental Management Act of 2002 prohibits the discharge of pollutants into the environment. In line with the "Polluter Pays" principle, the Act requires a polluter to meet the cost of decontaminating the polluted environment.

== In Cap and Trade schemes ==
The European Cap and trade scheme limit emissions of specified pollutants over an area and make polluters pay for their pollution, requiring them to buy allowances to emit enough to cover their emissions, from the EU or from other companies. The ETS covers around 40% of the EU's greenhouse gas emissions.

== In international environmental law ==
While it is not recognized as a binding principle in all sectors of international environmental law, it is mentioned as principle 16 of the Rio Declaration on Environment and Development of 1992.

== Exception for excusable ignorance ==
The polluter pays principle (PPP) has been doubted in cases where no one recognized that a type of pollution posed any danger until after the pollution began. An example occurs in the history of climate change science which shows that considerable carbon dioxide was emitted into the atmosphere by industrialized countries before there was scientific awareness or consensus that it could be dangerous.

== See also ==
- Carbon tax – Tax on carbon emissions
- Cost allocation – Principle in cost accounting
- Ecotax – Compulsory fee intended to discourage environmentally harmful acts
- Environmental Principles and Policies
- Extended producer responsibility – Strategy to integrate environmental costs associated with goods
- Externality – Imposed cost or benefit in economics
- Feebate – Self-financing system of fees and rebates
- Pigouvian tax – Tax on activity generating negative externalities
- Pollutant release and transfer register – System for registering environmental pollutants
- Polluter pays amendment in Florida
- Pollution control – Adverse environmental contamination
- Pottery Barn rule – Store policy on damage of goods by customers
- Public good – Good that is non-excludable and non-rival
- Severance tax – Taxes imposed on removal of natural resources
