= You break it, you buy it =

Store policy on damage of goods by customers

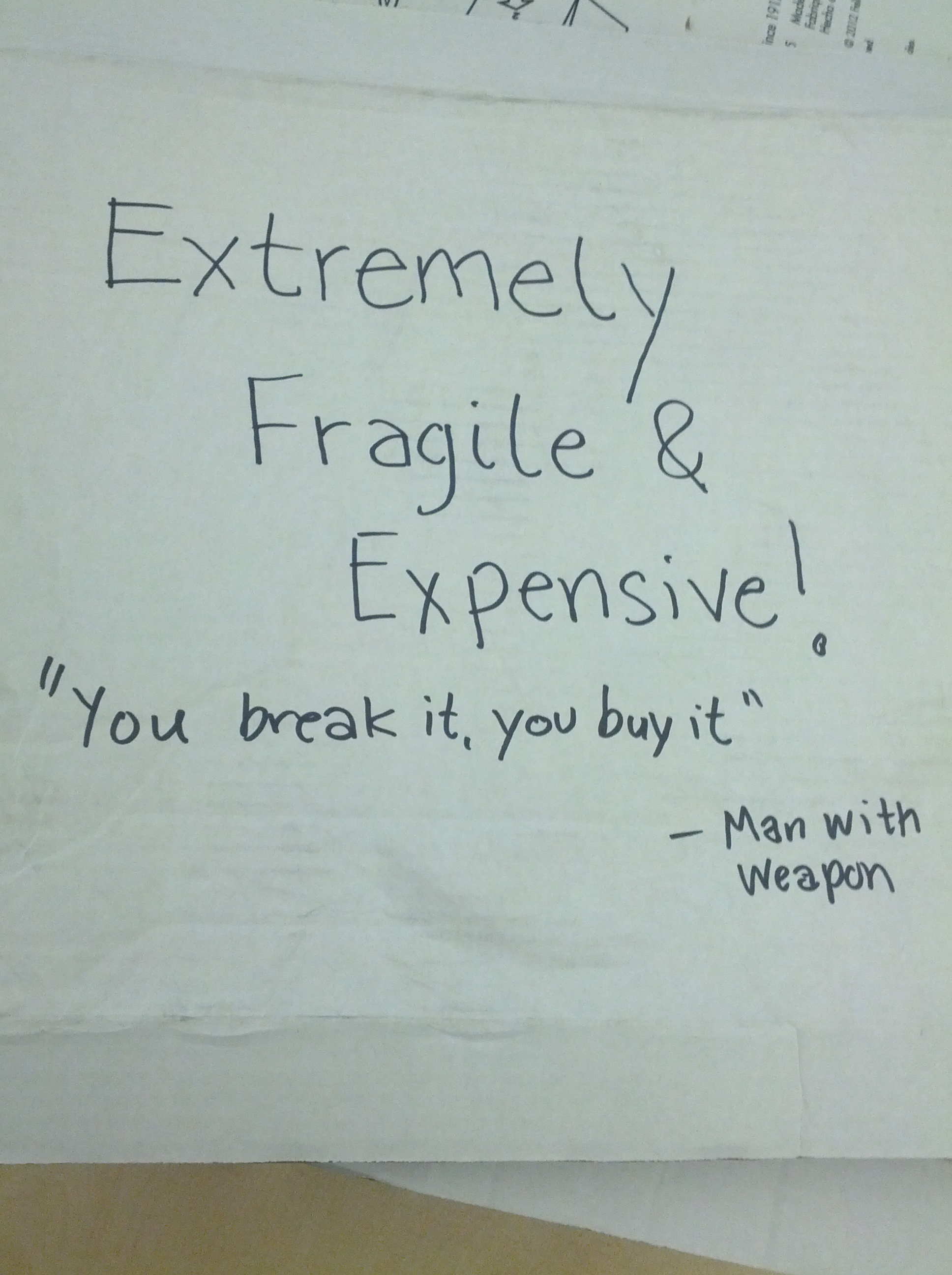
A note stating the rule signed by "Man with weapon".

"You break it, you buy it", "you break it, you've bought it", or "you break it, you remake it" are terms for a policy by which a retail store holds a customer responsible for damage done to merchandise on display. It generally encourages customers to be careful when handling others' property. In United States politics, the phrase has also been used metaphorically, to suggest that if an actor inadvertently creates a problem, the actor is obliged to provide the resources necessary to correct it. During the Iraq War, this principle was referred to as the Pottery Barn rule, although that company does not have such a policy.

== Origin ==
The phrase "If you break it, you've bought it" was reportedly first used in 1952 by a Miami Beach gift shop, who posted the message over their fragile merchandise.

Individually operated furnishing stores selling fragile goods (art, pottery, and sculptures) often post a "you break it, you buy it" sign. According to legal experts, 'If the sign is big enough, and prominently displayed, it can be argued that you were given what lawyers call "sufficient notice"' and 'In this case, just by entering the store you agree to the terms of the sign, even if you didn't read it'. In addition, it is the customer's responsibility to be careful in a premises with many fragile valuable goods; so careless behavior such as an untied shoelace or horsing around can be regarded as negligent. However the rule is rarely enforced, as the establishment cannot detain a customer for non-payment of damages and instead would have to file a civil suit against that customer. In actual practice even a civil suit is unlikely if the patron lacks the means to pay, such as damaged artwork in a museum that could be worth millions.

In reality, Pottery Barn, a chain of upscale home furnishing stores in the United States, does not have a "you break it, you bought it" policy, but instead writes off broken merchandise as a loss, as do most large American retailers. Legal doctrine also holds that a retailer incurs the risk that merchandise will be destroyed by placing it where customers can handle it and not doing anything to discourage them.

== Political usage ==
New York Times columnist Thomas L. Friedman used the phrase "the pottery store rule" in a February 12, 2003, column. He said he later referred to Pottery Barn in speeches. This has led to the common misconception that Pottery Barn enforces this rule as a store policy. According to Washington Post journalist Bob Woodward, U.S. Secretary of State Colin Powell cited the rule in the summer of 2002 when warning President George W. Bush of the consequences of his planned military action in Iraq:

"You are going to be the proud owner of 25 million people," he told the president. "You will own all their hopes, aspirations, and problems. You'll own it all." Privately, Powell and Deputy Secretary of State Richard Armitage called this the Pottery Barn rule: You break it, you own it.

Powell confirmed the quotation on Jonathan Dimbleby's Jonathan Dimbleby program on April 30, 2006.

Democratic presidential candidate John Kerry cited the rule and attributed it to Powell in debating Bush on policy on the Iraq war during the first debate of the 2004 Presidential election:

KERRY: Secretary of State Colin Powell told this president [Bush] the Pottery Barn rule: If you break it, you fix it. Now, if you break it, you made a mistake. It's the wrong thing to do. But you own it. And then you've got to fix it and do something with it. Now that's what we have to do. There's no inconsistency. Soldiers know over there that this isn't being done right yet. I'm going to get it right for those soldiers, because it's important to Israel, it's important to America, it's important to the world, it's important to the fight on terror. But I have a plan to do it. He [Bush] doesn't.

Powell denies using the term "Pottery Barn rule", but stated:

It is said that I used the "Pottery Barn rule." I never did it; [Thomas] Friedman did it ... But what I did say ... [is that] once you break it, you are going to own it, and we're going to be responsible for 26 million people standing there looking at us. And it's going to suck up a good 40 to 50 percent of the Army for years. And it's going to take all the oxygen out of the political environment ..."

During the 2026 Iran war, Financial Times journalist Martin Wolf recalled the Pottery Barn rule, arguing that because of President Donald Trump's war on Iran and the ensuing 2026 Strait of Hormuz crisis in which Iran closed the strait and caused global shortages, Trump therefore had to "own" the crisis of his making.

== See also ==
- Polluter pays principle – Principle in environmental law
