= Climate change in Florida =

Climate change in the U.S. state of Florida

The effects of climate change in Florida are attributable to man-made increases in atmospheric carbon dioxide. Floridians are experiencing increased flooding due to sea level rise, and are concerned about the possibility of more frequent or more intense hurricanes.

The state has been described as America's "ground zero" for climate change, global warming and sea level rise, because "the majority of its population and economy is concentrated along low-elevation oceanfront."

Florida residents think climate change is happening at higher rates than the national average. As of March 2025, 88% of Floridians believe climate change is happening, with 55% believing it to be attributable to human activities. However, the state remains politically divided, with 74% of Democrats and 40% of Republicans agreeing with the scientific consensus that climate change is anthropogenic. Some communities in Florida have begun implementing climate change mitigation approaches; however, statewide initiatives have been hampered by the politicization of climate change in the United States, focusing on resilience rather than full scale mitigation and adaptation.

== Impacts on the natural environment ==
=== Sea level rise ===
A predicted Köppen climate classification map for Florida in 2071-2099 using the SSP585 scenario (assuming highest possible greenhouse gas emissions.) The tropical region could hypothetically spread to regions as far north as Tampa on the Gulf Coast and Cape Canaveral on the Atlantic coast.

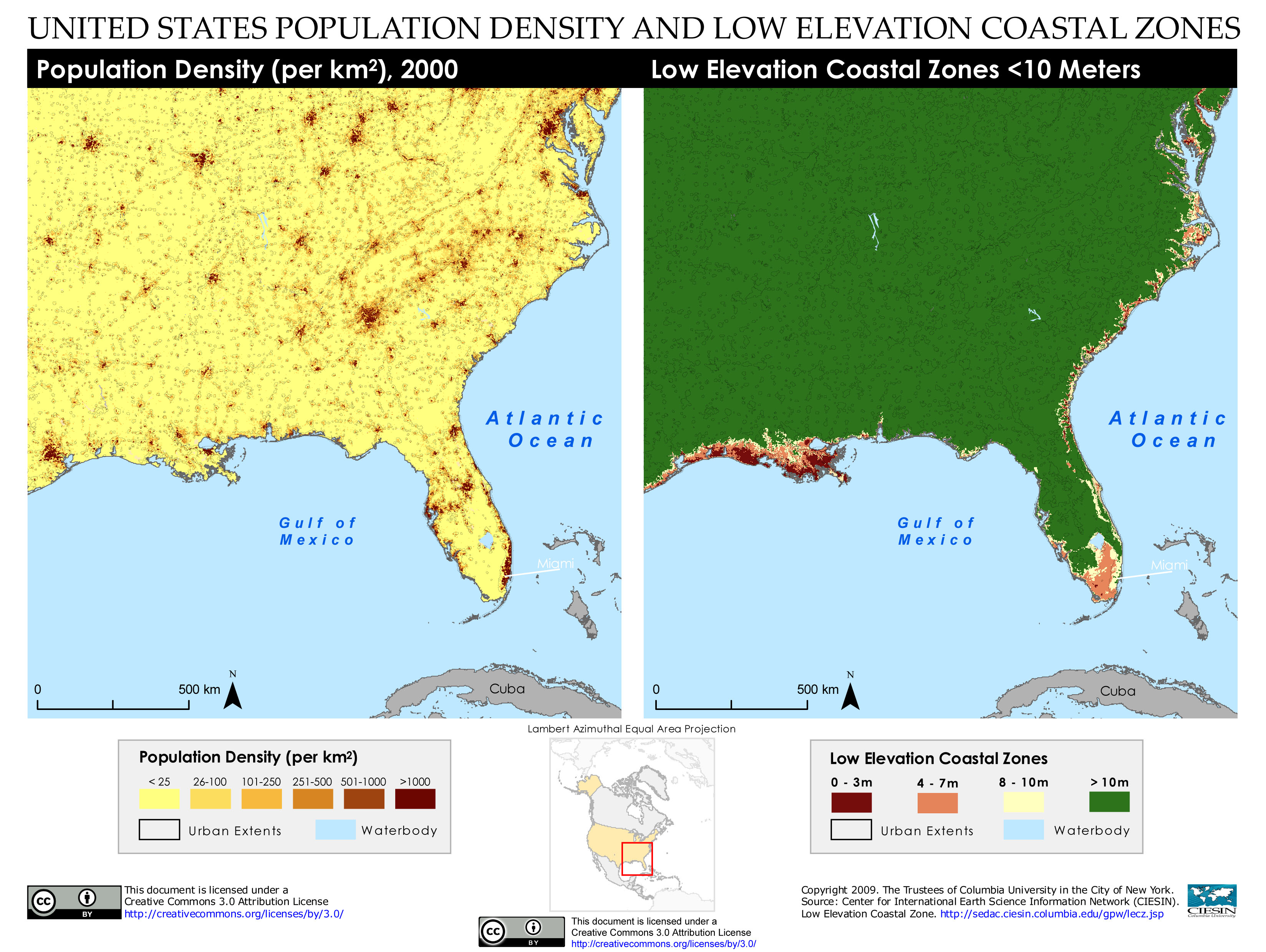
South eastern USA population density and low elevation coastal zones.

Since the early 1990s, sea levels in the Southeast U.S. have risen 0.12 inches (3.0 mm) per year on average. This rate is accelerating and it is projected to continue accelerating. Sea level rise is already making saltwater intrusion worse in Florida which impacts groundwater supplies. A natural phenomenon known as king tide flooding is also being exacerbated by sea level rise. This is when high tides at certain times of year are so high that they result in saltwater flooding in the absence of any precipitation. Salt water rises up through the porous limestone that Florida sits on.

A 2018 report by the Union of Concerned Scientists (UCS) found that by the year 2100, more than 1 million Florida homes would be at risk of flooding according to their high scenario projection.

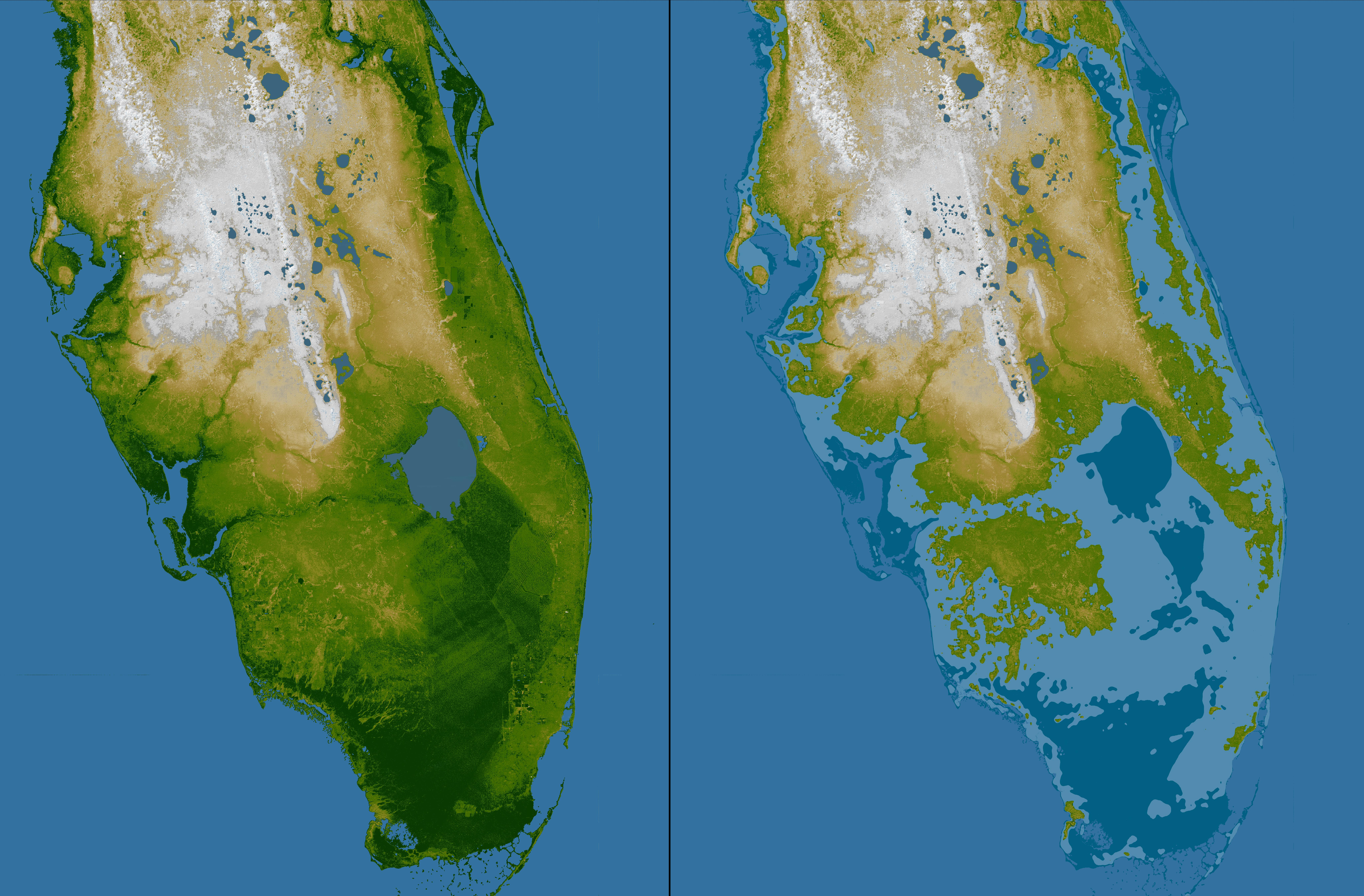
color-coded shaded relief map generated with data from the Shuttle Radar Topography Mission. For the view on the right, elevations below 5 meters (16 feet) above sea level have been colored dark blue, and lighter blue indicates elevations below 10 meters (33 feet).

A 2018 Florida International University study says that sea level rise will inundate the mangroves of the Florida Everglades. As the ocean rises, it will flood the Everglades and the Biscayne Aquifer, impacting the water supply of Miami.

=== Mangroves ===
Due to climate change, the range of mangroves worldwide is extending. This is due to a combination of fewer hard freezes and more intense storms. Warmer weather prevents mangroves from dying during winter months and stronger storms spread the propagules of mangroves further. However, sea level rise places certain populations of mangroves, such as those in the Everglades, at risk.

Mangroves, as well as other organisms in coastal and ocean ecosystems are referred to as blue carbon, acting as carbon sinks in the process of carbon sequestration. Carbon in blue carbon areas is stored at a faster rate than in other ecosystems, such as forests, and can remain sequestered for millions of years. The stored carbon in the mangroves of the Everglades has been estimated to be worth between $2 billion and $3.4 billion. When damaged, these ecosystems release very large amounts of carbon into the atmosphere.

Mangroves also act as habitat for many species of juvenile fish and shellfish, provide protection from storm surge and strong winds, and produce soil which helps maintain the height of the coastline. The loss of mangroves and wetlands would cause commercial fisheries to decline and negatively impact the ability of coastal areas to resist damage from storms.

=== Red tide ===
Red tide, or harmful algal bloom, is a naturally occurring overgrowth of microscopic algae that originates in high salinity bodies of water. These blooms can cost millions of dollars in fisheries closures, lost tourism dollars, hospital visits, and cleanup efforts. Economically destructive red tides are expected to be exacerbated by pollution and warming water.

=== Hurricanes ===
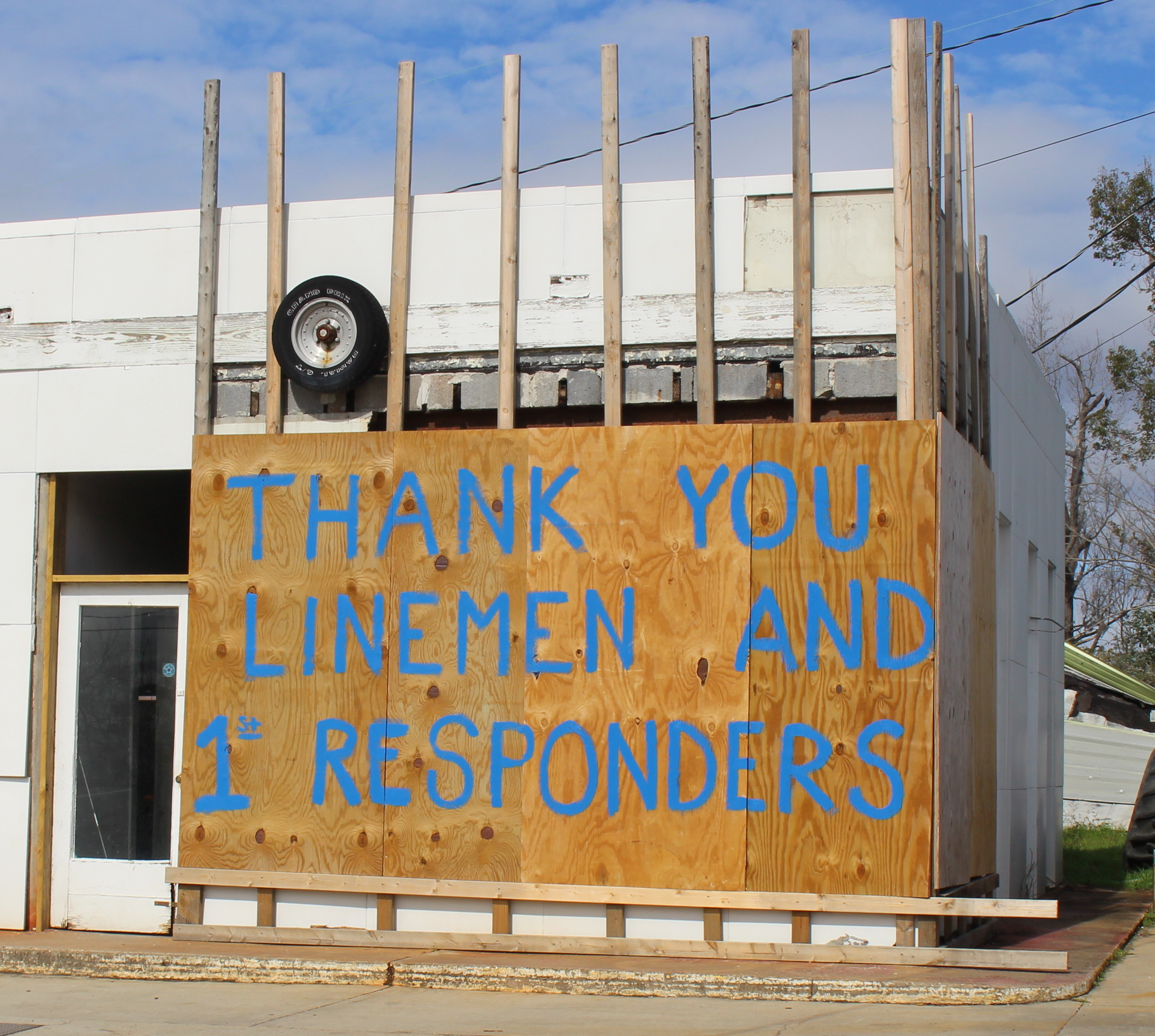
Sign thanking lineworkers and first responders after Hurricane Michael, Chattahoochee 2019

A change in hurricane frequency or intensity is of concern for Floridians. The Climate Change Center at Florida State University and Climate.gov say the science is inconclusive regarding an increase in hurricane frequency and the limited historical data makes it difficult to find any long term patterns that differentiate from natural variability. However, rainfall rates and hurricane intensity are expected to increase according to most climate models and it has been established that the warming of the ocean is partly due to anthropogenic climate change. The storm surge associated with hurricanes will also pose a greater threat due to rising sea levels.

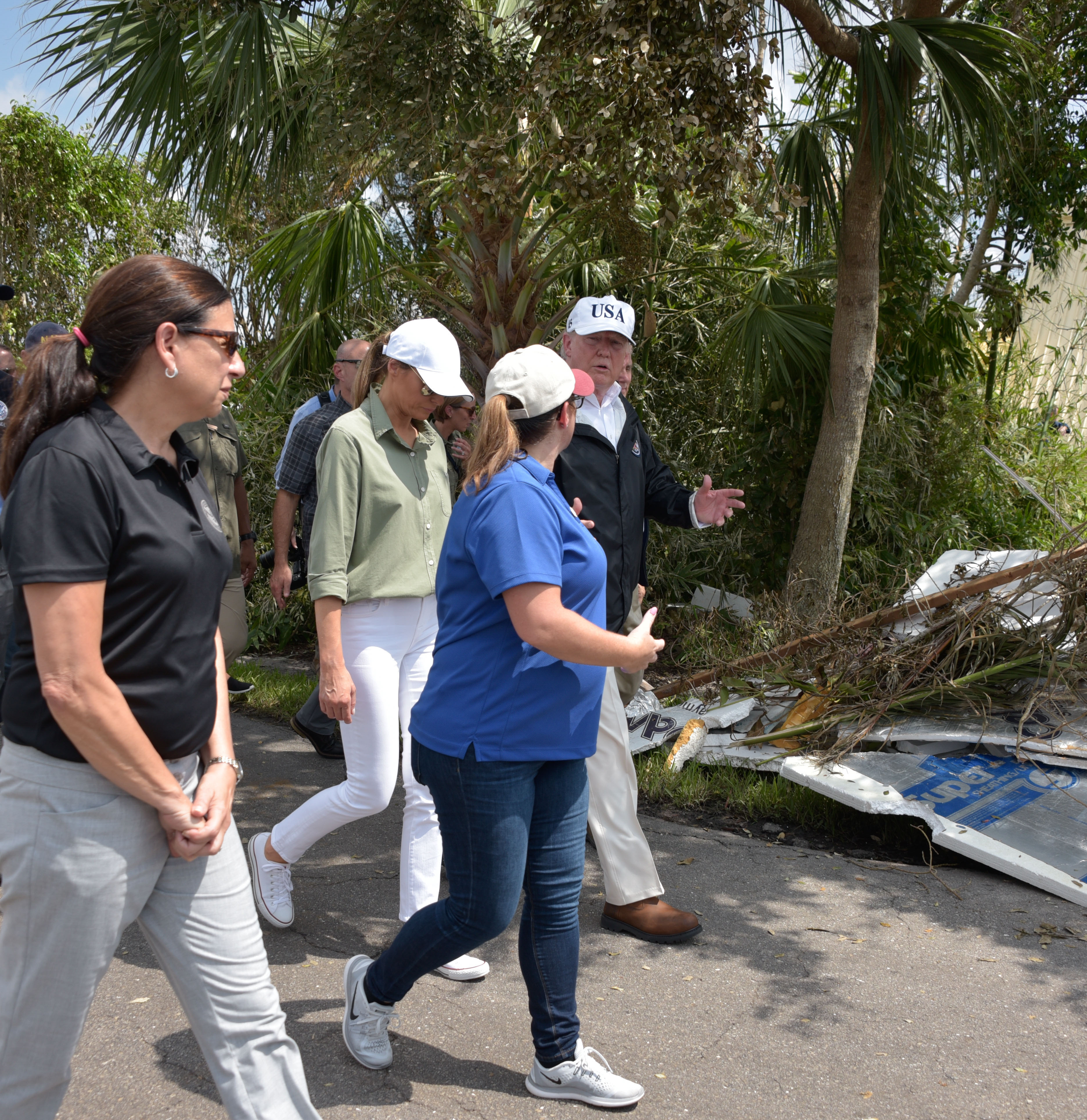
President Donald Trump viewing Hurricane Irma damage, Naples

After Hurricane Irma in 2017, which occurred just weeks after Hurricane Harvey, Governor Rick Scott did not attribute the possible changes in hurricane patterns to climate change.

There is some evidence that hurricanes may slow down their rate of forward advance, like Hurricane Dorian, which spent a day and a half over Grand Bahama Island on its way to Florida.

A category 5 hurricane is of most concern in the Tampa Bay area, and climate related sea level rise of as little as six inches would exacerbate its impact.

According to the Fifth National Climate Assessment published in 2023, coastal states including California, Florida, Louisiana, and Texas are experiencing "more significant storms and extreme swings in precipitation".

== Impacts on People ==
=== Transportation ===
The Florida Department of Transportation (FDOT) has studied how to use greenhouse gas calculation tools as part of the transportation planning processes, and analyzes transportation infrastructure for impacts of sea level rise.

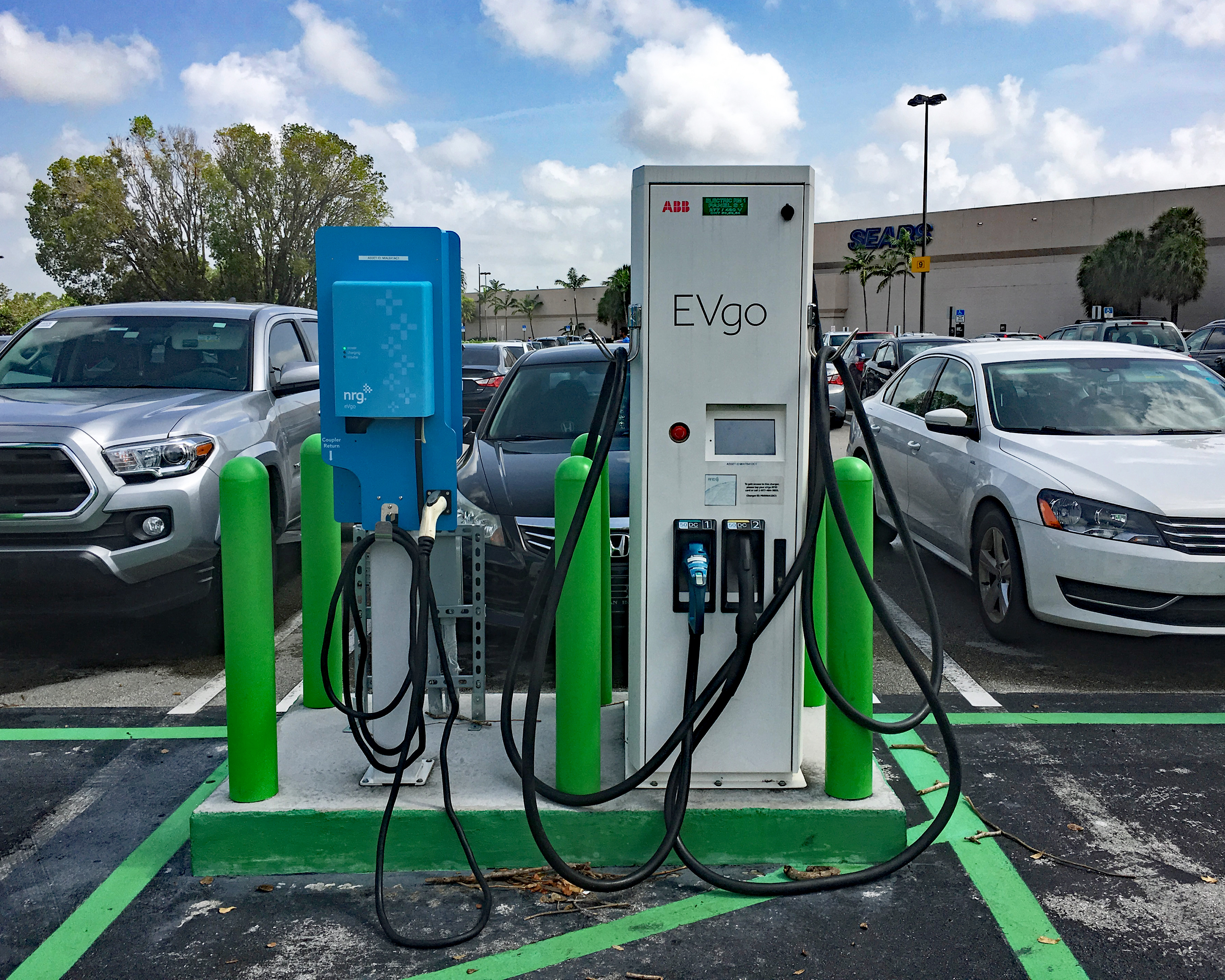
Electric vehicle charging station, Miami

To aid in assessing the potential impact of sea level rise on transportation facilities, the University of Florida (UF) developed a geospatial tool called the Sea Level Scenario Sketch Planning Tool. This is used by the FDOT, local governments, and other agencies to identify transportation infrastructure that may be vulnerable to flooding from sea level rise.

=== Real estate ===
The UCS reported in 2018 that Florida was the state with the most homes at risk from sea level rise.

In 2017, the real estate website Zillow wrote that if climate predictions were correct, by 2100 "One in eight Florida homes would be under water, accounting for nearly half of the lost housing value nationwide." This calculation was based on comparing NOAA maps for a 6-foot sea level rise with the Zillow database of homes.

Real estate website Curbed has presented a table with impacted cities in Florida, homes at risk, and dollar estimates. Curbed has estimated that "Roughly 64,000 homes—including 12,000 in Miami Beach, a nexus of real estate investment—will face chronic flooding," and has described how changes are needed in National Flood Insurance Program. AP cites data from climate risk analytics firm Jupiter Intelligence indicating that "extreme flooding could go from affecting 5% to 86% of Miami-Dade's residential real estate supply by 2030."

Officials in the Florida Keys found that it would take 75 million dollars to save three miles of road serving about two dozen homes. A December 2019 New York Times article describing the decisions facing Monroe County was titled, "Florida Keys Deliver a Hard Message: As Seas Rise, Some Places Can't Be Saved." Some small islands in the Keys may disappear altogether.

Climate gentrification is increasing real estate values in parts of Miami that are at higher elevation, and decreasing values in lower-elevation areas. By 2017, two poor black neighborhoods of Miami which are located on higher ground, Little Haiti and Liberty City, started becoming more attractive to investors. Home prices appreciated more slowly in 2018 in Miami Beach and lower-lying areas of Miami-Dade County.

One flood assessment company describes the South Florida housing market as being kept afloat by "systemic fraudulent nondisclosure" of flood risks to property. A bill passed by the US House of Representatives to require real estate agents to disclose flood risks had not made it through the Senate as of February 2019.

=== Agriculture ===
The agriculture industry in Florida provides over two million jobs and generates over $120 billion in revenue each year. Agriculture in Florida has historically had to adapt to natural climate variations, but modern climate change is occurring at a faster and greater rate. Rising temperatures are already linked to lower crop yields and higher atmospheric CO2 can reduce the nutritional value of many crops despite stimulating growth. Intensified extreme weather events and sea level rise also pose a threat to Florida agriculture, having the potential to impact irrigation water and increase pressure from pests and disease.

Strategies for dealing with climate change challenges include, developing more efficient technologies for irrigation and nutrient use, breeding crops and livestock that are resistant to heat and disease, and further research to better understand the impact of climate change on Florida agriculture and close any current knowledge gaps.

=== Human health ===
Florida and the U.S. Southeast region face many health-related threats due to tropical storms, sea level rise, extreme heat, and drought.

==== Population vulnerability ====
A considerable proportion of Florida's population has characteristics that may make them more vulnerable to health impacts or that may pose barriers to accessing healthcare; approximately 21.6% of Florida's population is over the age of 65, 21.0% are foreign born, 12.7% live below the federal poverty level, and approximately 13.9% of the population does not have health insurance.

==== Flooding and hurricanes ====
Due to its low elevation and the fact that it is the U.S. state with the largest number and percentage of its population living in coastal areas, Florida is at significant risk from flooding. South Florida is especially vulnerable to sea level rise, with 590,000 people facing high or extreme risk from flooding. Of those, it is estimated that 55,000 are medically vulnerable and 125,000 are socially vulnerable. In a 2025 report assessing the people and places in the U.S. most at risk for severe flooding by 2050, Saint Petersburg and Miami Beach were listed as the cities having the third and fourth largest number of people at risk, with 46,000 and 45,000 respectively.

Hurricanes can threaten health in a variety of direct and indirect ways. In the United States, drowning is the leading cause of flooding-related death, particularly due to powerful storm surges. Although the U.S. is not considered to be at high risk for post flood related gastrointestinal illness, there is an increased risk among populations facing displacement due to poor sanitation and crowding in shelters. Food spoilage due to power outages have also been shown to cause outbreaks of these types of illnesses. In Florida, power outages after Hurricane Irma were associated with higher mortality in nursing home residents. During the evacuation process, people can lose or forget medication and devices such as hearing aids or dentures and may have difficulty filling prescriptions. A 2004 study of Hurricane Charley found a link between exposure to high wind speeds and an increased risk of preterm birth. A retrospective analysis from 2020 shows further evidence of this association.

Longer-term impacts include those on mental and respiratory health, as well as exposure to harmful substances. Flooding puts people at higher risk of mental health challenges such as post-traumatic stress disorder (PTSD), anxiety, and depression. Recovery after a major storm can involve heavy construction and exposure to hazardous materials in floodwaters such as sewage, chemicals, and sharp or broken objects. Florida's hot and humid climate creates favorable conditions for mold growth, these conditions are exacerbated after flooding and result in an increased exposure to mold spores which can cause worsened asthma, throat irritation, and wheezing.

==== Extreme heat ====
The impacts on health of climate change fueled extreme heat are anticipated to be minimal due to Florida's already warm climate that means that much of the population is acclimatized, or adjusted, to heat and most buildings have air conditioning installed. However, extreme heat may still be a threat to older adults, homeless populations, and people who spend time outdoors such as workers in industries such as agriculture and tourism, as well as tourists themselves. In summer 2023, Orlando, which contains theme parks such as Disney World, saw its first-ever heat warning from the National Weather Service and saw more than double the number of heat-related distress calls compared to five years prior.

==== Mosquito-borne diseases ====
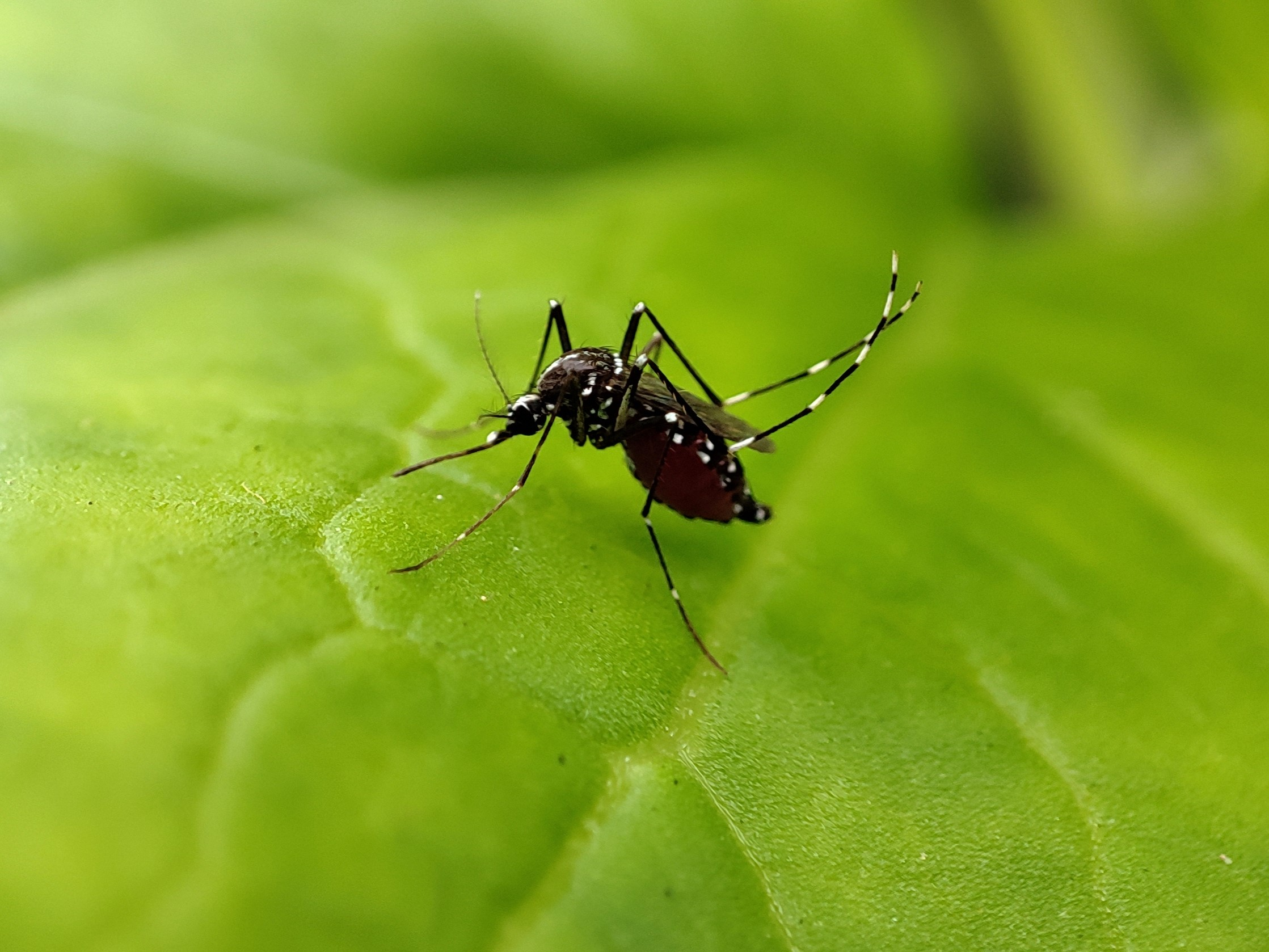
An Aedes aegypti mosquito on a leaf. CC BY-SA 4.0 by Wee Hong

Because it is habitable for Aedes aegypti mosquitoes, Southern Florida has a high suitability for mosquito-borne diseases like Zika, dengue, chikungunya and yellow fever. Climate change is expected to make much of the Southeastern U.S. more vulnerable to mosquito-borne diseases. As temperatures increase due to climate change, the mosquito breeding season becomes longer and mosquitoes are able to spread further north. A longer breeding season increases the overall number of mosquitoes and with it, the risk of being bitten. In addition to higher temperatures, precipitation during storms is expected to increase due to climate change. This can cause flooding which would exacerbate mosquito issues by providing more standing water for the insects to breed in.

=== Wildfires ===
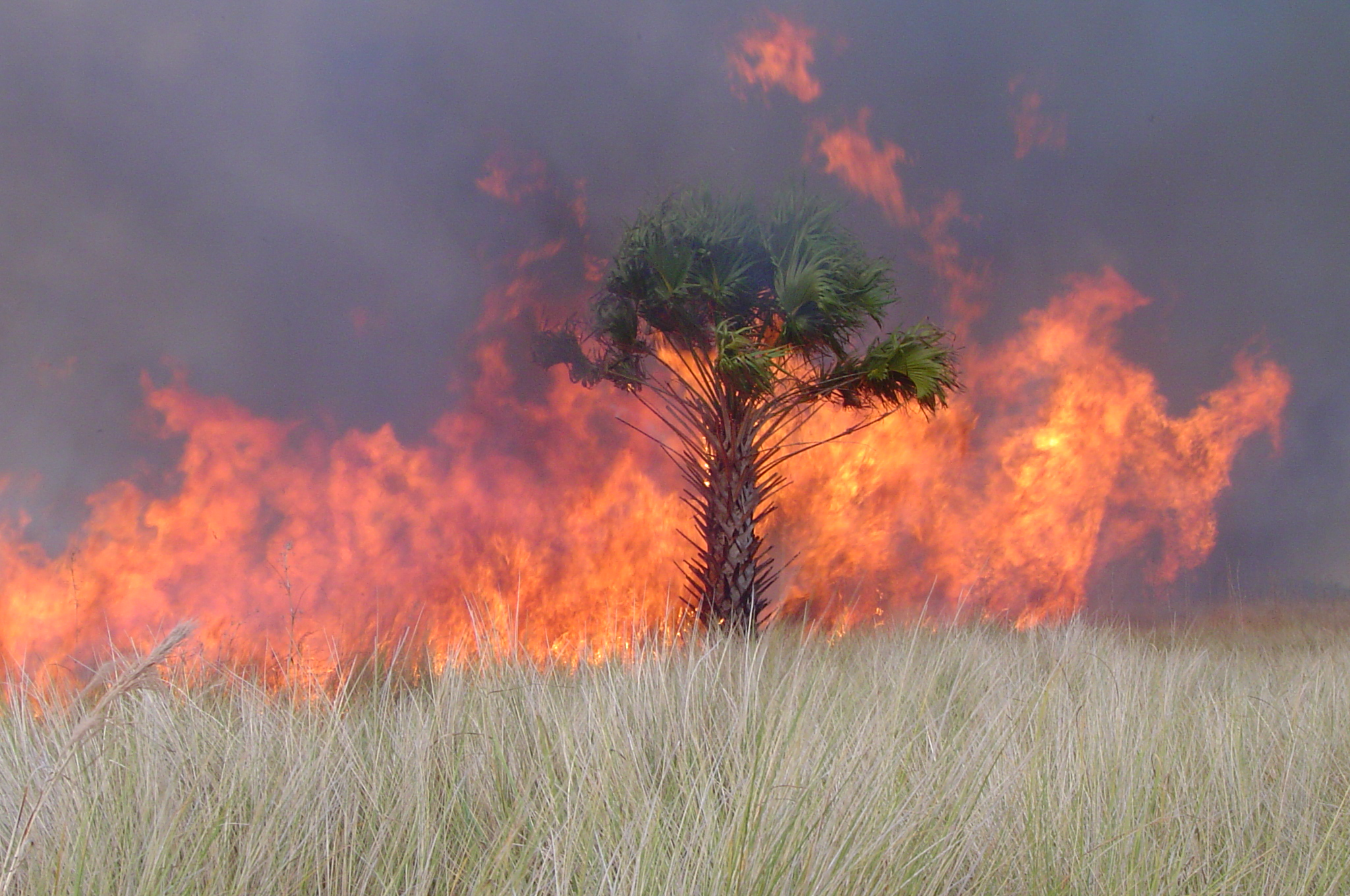
Fox lake wildfire

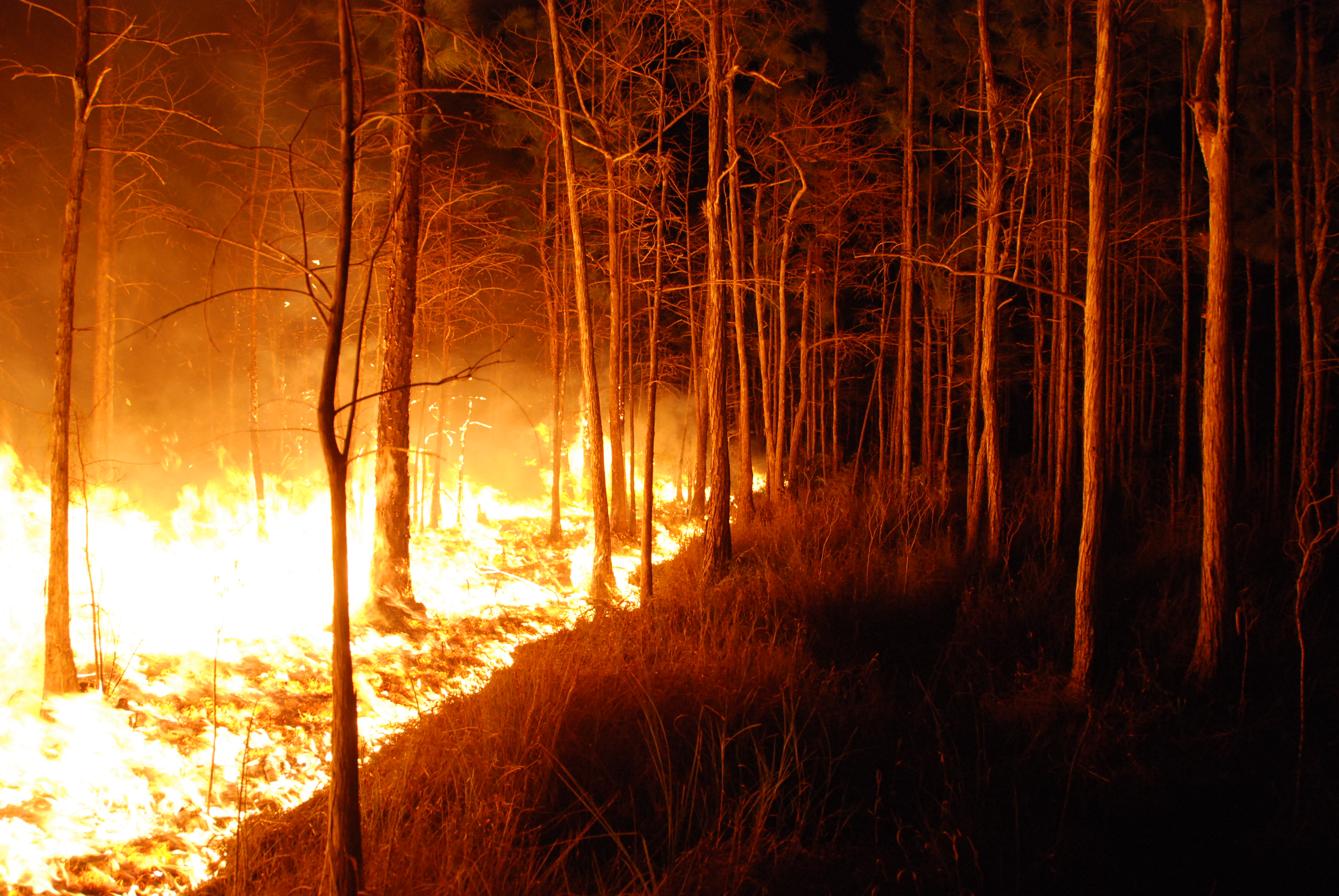
Wildfire, Florida Panther National Wildlife Refuge, 2009

While Florida doesn't make headlines like California and Colorado, it too is vulnerable to wildfires, which can have impacts on respiratory and cardiovascular health. Fire is a natural part of many Florida ecosystems and previous attempts at full scale fire suppression have not been successful. After the 1998 fire that burned 500,000 acres, Florida moved away from fire suppression and implemented regular prescribed burns to prevent such a large accumulation of fuel on forest floors. The Florida wildfire season is year round, but peaks during the driest months from April to June. As temperatures increase and droughts become more common due to climate change, so too does the likelihood of more destructive wild fires. Larger areas are drying out to a greater extent and becoming more susceptible to large, destructive fires, as can be seen in the August 2025 wildfire in the Everglades which consumed 48,000 acres.

== Mitigation and adaptation ==
=== State climate change policy ===
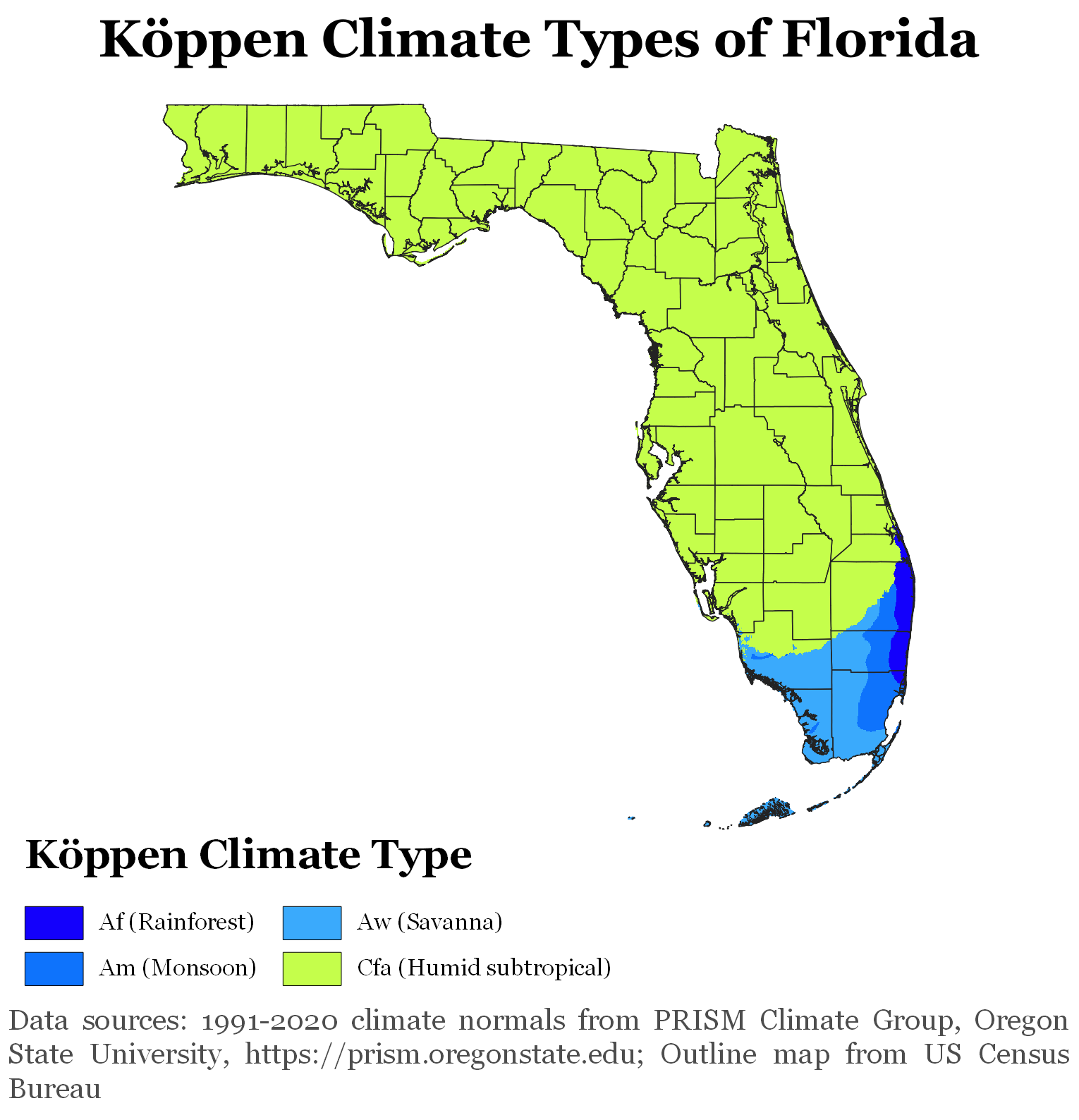
Köppen climate types of Florida, using 1991–2020 climate normals.

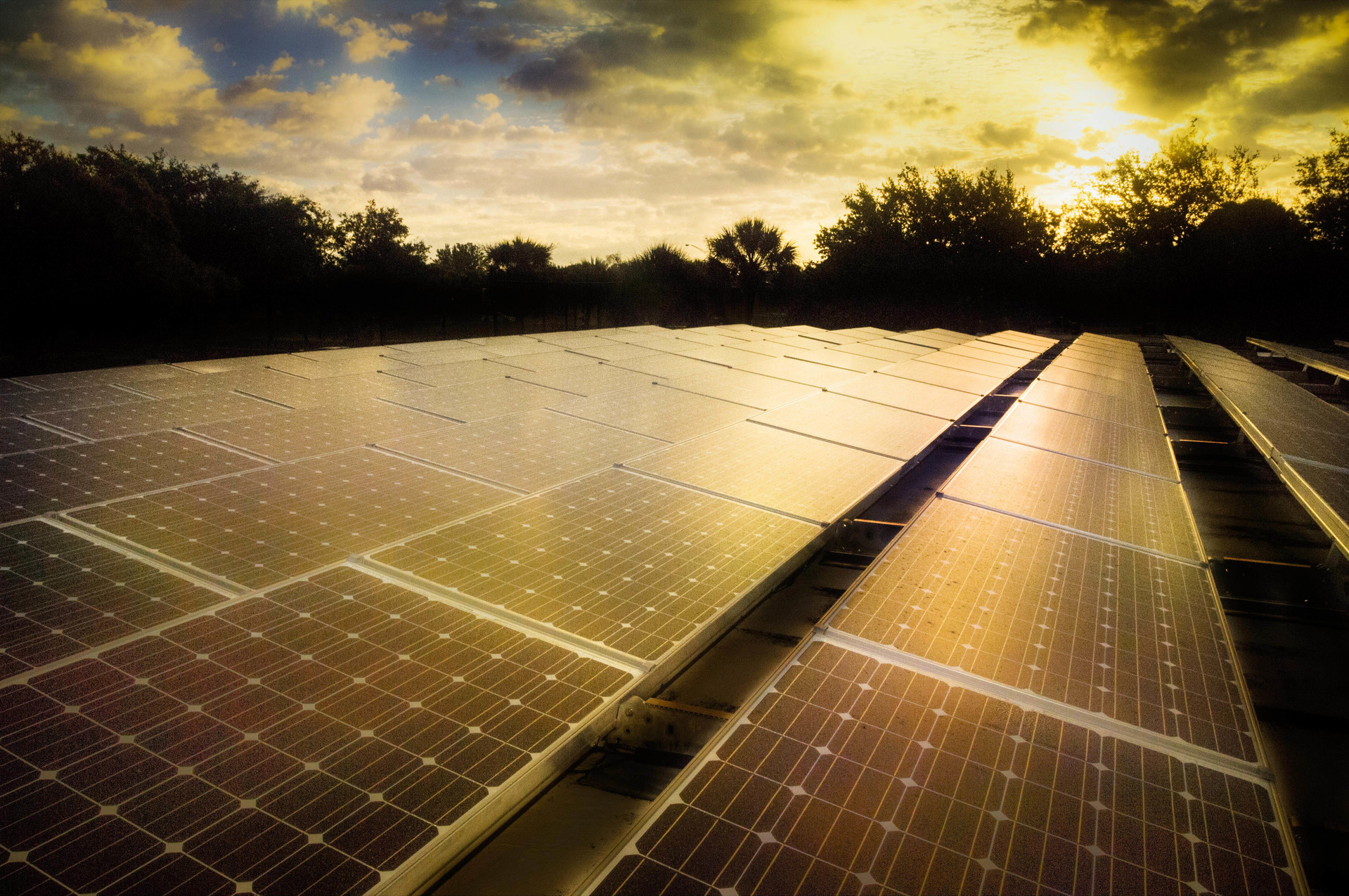
Solar array on parking area rooftop, Broward County

The Florida Climate Protection Act of 2008 created the Florida Energy and Climate Commission. It also urged the Department of Environmental Protection to develop a greenhouse gas reduction strategy. However, the bill was never ratified and The Climate Protection Act was repealed in 2012.

Governor Charlie Crist signed several executive orders related to climate change upon taking office. These executive orders included tailpipe emission limits for cars sold in Florida, called for reductions in the state's greenhouse gas emissions, and mandated a minimum of 20 percent renewable energy by 2020 for Florida's electric utilities. The Public Service Commission rejected six new coal-fired power plants under Crist.

Governor Rick Scott "denied the idea of anthropogenic global warming" during his first election in 2010. Use of the term "climate change" was discouraged during his administration. He also eliminated mandates to reduce greenhouse gas emissions and appointed climate skeptics to posts such as the Public Service Commission. Scott vetoed $750,000 budgeted for pumping water out of Miami Beach, on the grounds that the money didn't provide "a clear statewide return for the investment," and did not reply directly when asked if he would support efforts to protect Miami's water supply. Scott was sued by a group of children aged 10–20 for his positions on climate.

Governor Ron DeSantis established an Office of Resiliency and Coastal Protection. DeSantis was noted for actually speaking the word "climate change" in his statement: "This idea of – quote – 'climate change' has become politicized. My environmental policy is just to try to do things that benefit Floridians." However, DeSantis has not made climate mitigation, renewable energy, or greenhouse gas reduction a policy priority. In January 2020, DeSantis was given a D grade by the Sierra Club of Florida "for his work on environmental protection and sustainability."

Florida's Republican candidates in local, state, and national office have emphasized risk mitigation and resilience for dealing with climate-related impacts, rather than climate mitigation efforts to prevent climate change.

By contrast, South Florida Republicans, such as Miami-Dade County Mayor Carlos Giménez, Representative Carlos Curbelo, and former Representative Ileana Ros-Lehtinen, have said that "man-made climate change is real and needs to be taken seriously."

Florida State Senator José Javier Rodriguez has attempted to draw attention to the problem of sunny day flooding by wearing black rainboots during legislative sessions.

In May 2024, Republican governor Ron DeSantis signed into law, removal of eight of fifteen references to climate change from state laws, removing greenhouse gas emissions reduction as a priority for energy policy, banning construction of offshore wind turbines off Florida's coasts, weakening regulations on natural gas pipelines, and preventing cities from banning appliances like gas stoves.

Coastal protection, including beach renourishment, has been a focus of state government.

=== Public opinion ===
The "Energy Poll", conducted by researchers at the University of Texas at Austin, found that 63% of Floridians in March 2012 believed climate change occurs. The same survey conducted in 2016 saw the number rise to 81%. An October 2020 survey conducted by Florida Atlantic University (FAU) found that over two-thirds of Florida residents expressed concerns about the impact of climate change on the state's future. In 2023, the FAU's "Florida Climate Resilience Survey" found that 65% of respondents, including 49% of Republicans, believe that climate change is predominantly the result of human activity.

As of March 2025, the FAU survey found that 88% of Floridians believe climate change is happening, with 55% believing it to be attributable to human activities. However, the state remains politically divided, with 74% of Democrats and 40% of Republicans agreeing with the scientific consensus that climate change is anthropogenic.

=== Education ===
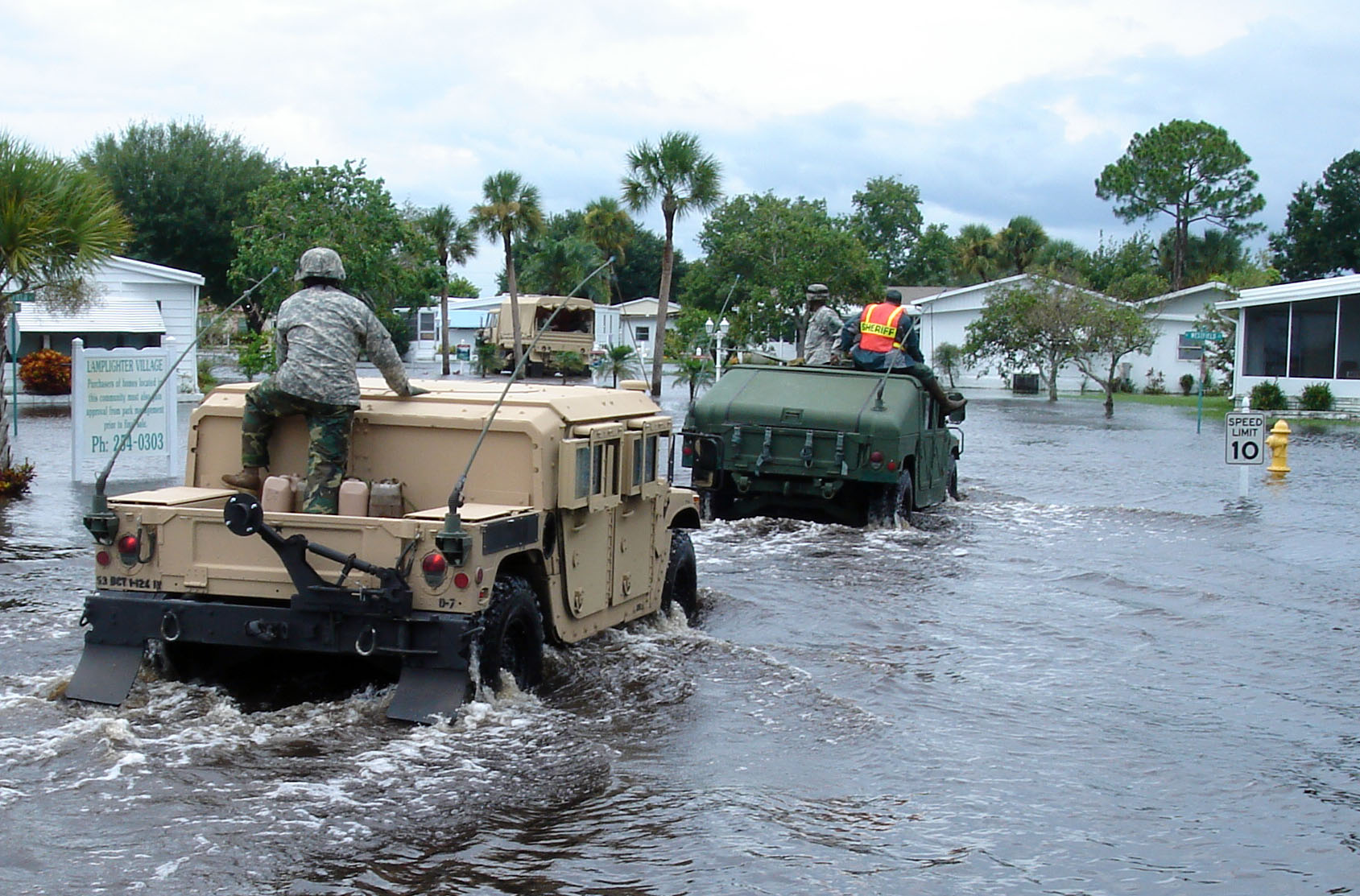
Flooding evacuation, Melbourne

Florida's climate change education standard states: "Identify, analyze, and relate the internal (earth system) and external (astronomical) conditions that contribute to global climate change." The standard falls short of the Next Generation Science Standards, which have been adopted by 20 states and the District of Columbia. The human-caused elements of climate change and role of human activity are treated "as an aside," according to a leader with the Alliance for Climate Education.

=== Local climate mitigation efforts ===
The city of Miami Beach is spending $500M on elevated roadways, seawalls, and pumping systems, as part of its Sea Level Rise Strategy. GIS mapping of areas subject to flooding during high tides, storm surges, and major storm events is available.

In Key Largo and Big Pine Key, $517,000 is being spent to raise one mile of roads, as a "Sea Level Rise Pilot Project".

Miami-Dade County has built seawalls, implemented an Urban CO_{2} Reduction Plan, and participates in the South Florida Regional Climate Compact. Miami Mayor Francis Suarez has pledged to make the city carbon neutral by 2050.

Pensacola has formed a Climate Mitigation and Adaptation Task Force which meets monthly.

Orlando Mayor Buddy Dyer was "one of the nation's first mayors to sign onto the Climate Mayors' Pledge." Orlando plans to convert its city vehicle fleet to alternative fuels by 2030.

Sarasota's Climate Adaption and Mitigation Center has been funded to work on "a curated database of peer-reviewed science to inform decision-making in academia, government and the private sector."

In North Central Florida, where climate change denial is stronger, climate change efforts were starting to be visible in 2020 in Gainesville, Alachua County, St. Augustine and Jacksonville.

In Broward County's Oakland Park, drainage installed with a Federal Emergency Management Agency (FEMA) Hazard Mitigation Grant prevented damage to 400 homes during Hurricane Irma.

Coral Gables Mayor Jim Cason has said, "We're working hard to create solutions until we inevitably must retreat."

==== Climate journalism ====
The South Florida Sun Sentinel, Miami Herald and Palm Beach Post, along with WLRN Public Media, have formed a collaboration to cover climate change issues. The collaboration provides news and feature coverage, and a website created by its editorial boards titled: The Invading Sea, Florida and the Climate Crisis.

==== Southeast Florida Regional Climate Compact ====
The Southeast Florida Regional Climate Compact is a partnership between Broward, Miami-Dade, Monroe, and Palm Beach counties. Formed in 2009, its goal is "to work collaboratively to reduce regional greenhouse gas emissions, implement adaptation strategies, and build climate resilience".

==== Integrative Collaborative on Climate and Energy (ICCE) ====
The Florida Center for Environmental Studies at Florida Atlantic University has formed an Integrative Collaborative on Climate and Energy (ICCE) focused on issues of climate adaptation in Florida's urban and natural systems. Partners include the Florida Climate Initiative, the University of South Florida, and various government agencies.

==== Miami-Dade County Climate Programs ====
Miami has been described as "ground zero" for climate change and sea level rise." The Miami-Dade County Office of Resilience has implemented climate programs and a Climate Action Plan, and there is a Sea Level Rise Committee. Protecting the water supply and the Biscayne Aquifer is a priority.

== See also ==
- Climate of Florida
- Environment of Florida
- Climate change in the United States
- List of U.S. states and territories by carbon dioxide emissions
- Plug-in electric vehicles in Florida
- Neotropical realm
- Tropical climate
