= Wildlife regulations in Florida =

Bill CS/SB 318 is an amendment passed by the State of Florida in June 2010 which amends several sections of Chapter 379 of the Florida Statutes (F.S.). Sections 379.231, 379.372, 379.374, 379.3761, 379.401, and 379.4015 deal with wildlife regulations and were amended by this bill. Broadly, this bill seeks to regulate entities which own, import, sell and/or breed certain prohibited species of reptiles. Specifically this bill prohibits the ownership of a variety of commonly kept pythons and monitor species. Additionally, the bill provided rules for a commission to add species of reptiles to the prohibited list.

== Amendments to existing Florida law ==
Amendment to section 379.231 and 379.3762 changes the language throughout to bring continuity to the legal text.

Amended section 379.372 specifies a list of prohibited species which may not be possessed, imported into the state, sold, bartered, traded, or bred without the authorization of the Fish and Wildlife Conservation Commission (FWC). Prohibited animals include "Burmese or Indian python (Python molurus), reticulated python (Python reticulatus), Northern African python (Python sebae), Southern African python (Python natalensis), amethystine or scrub python (Morelia amethistina), green anaconda (Eunectes murinus), Nile monitor (Varanus niloticus), and any other reptile designated as a conditional or prohibited species by the FWC.

According to the Amended section 379.3761, F.S. prohibits the sale of any wild animal which is designated as a prohibited or conditional species, reptile of concern, or venomous reptiles in the State of Florida, regardless of the origin of the sale or location of the initial transaction.

Amended section 379.4015, F.S. is the penalty section of the amended statute. So called "conditional" or "Prohibited" reptile violations are a level two violation with a mandatory minimum fine of $100, and a requirement that the animal must be surrendered to the FWC unless a permit to possess is applied for and approved.

These amendments were made to Florida law to address concerns regarding the introduction of reptile species which seem capable of not only adapting to the local environment, but in fact seem to thrive. Florida Fish and Wildlife has found breeding colonies of Burmese pythons, a large Asian constrictor routinely sold through the United States as a pet, in the Everglades National Park.

== Permit to possess prohibited species ==
The state of Florida does allow for possession of species otherwise prohibited by law for the purposes of research. There is no fee for this permit. A research plan, security plan must be submitted to the Florida Fish and Wildlife Conservation Commission (FWC) in order to attain approval. Aquariums, zoological parks and public exhibitors may also acquire a permit.

== Prohibited Species possessed prior to the enactment of SB 318 ==
Individuals in possession of any conditional species prior to July 1, 2010 are allowed to retain ownership of their animals provided they maintain a valid reptile of concern license for the remainder of its life.

== Non-native invasive species in Florida ==
Burmese pythons are an invasive species in parts of Florida. It has been found that the climate of the Everglades enables the species to thrive . This species is also known to be breeding in parts of Florida along with the common Boa Constrictor. Conservationist and wildlife officials are concerned about this natural predator spreading to areas which are biologically vulnerable, the Florida Keys for example.

As a predator the Burmese python is a threat to the preservation of native wildlife. This pythons territorial expanse and adaptability to a variety of habitats, flexible dietary requirements and lifespan This species of python along is an excellent swimmer and has been shown to prey on the endangered . after a dietary analysis was performed on a specimen. They have been shown to eat a diversity of pretty to include rabbits, rats, squirrel, domestic cats, bobcats, a variety of bird species and the American alligator. The Burmese pythons flexible diet makes it a competitor for the States endangered Indigo snake.

Currently both Federal and State agencies are attempting to develop methods of containing and eradicating this and other invasive species. Due to the cost of controlling exotic species once introduced, preventing introduction of non-native species is of import. Legal measures such as Bill CS/SB 318 as passed by the State of Florida in June 2010 are initial attempts to mitigate the release of exotic species, such as the Burmese python and other reptiles.

== US Geological Survey and the threat of invasive species spreading ==
According to the US Geological Survey Burmese pythons, already established in parts of Florida are adaptable to temperature conditions in a significant portion of the United States. Current estimates show that almost one-third of the continental US would provide appropriate temperatures, shelter and prey which would facilitate the adaption of this python species.

Maps released by the USGS show that current environmental temperatures which match the Burmese pythons native environment include significant portions of the southeast, Texas and lower southwest. based on global warming models the USGS predicts that the suitable habitat for the Burmese pythons will expand greatly during the remaining portion of the century.

== Opponents of the Bill ==
The classification of the Burmese python as a subspecies of the Indian Python is not scientifically accepted anymore. Recent publications to include the "Zur taxonomie des dunklen tigerpythons, Python molurus bivittatus Kuhl, 1820, speziell der population von Sulawesi" in 2009 by Hans Jacobs et al. has established that the Burmese python is not a subspecies of the Indian Python. This is in addition to the 1999 report "The Burmese Python is a questionable subspecies of the Indian Python, Python molurus" which was coauthored by Dr. Rodda. To further this belief herpetologist will point to the fact that the United States Fish and Wildlife Service does not consider the Indian Python to be the same species as the Burmese Python. The Indian pythons is already banned from import or export with the interstate transportation of such animals being limited to those who possess a specific permit.

The reptile industry is responsible for the employment of thousands of individuals and has an economic net worth of approximately $3 billion each year, measures such as SB318 harm the industry as a whole. Opponents to the legislation passed by the State of Florida are critical of the measures taken for a variety of reasons. The United States Geological Survey which produced the maps and report detailing the possible expansion of Burmese pythons in as many as 32 States was written by Dr. Gordon Rodda. Dr. Rodda was the co-author of a paper in 1999 titled "The Burmese Python is a questionable subspecies of the Indian Python, Python molurus". This is significant to opponents who wonder why the paper Dr. Rodda coauthored for the USGS, "What Parts of the U.S. Mainland Are Climatically Suitable for Invasive Alien Pythons Spreading from Everglades National Park?", used climatic data for the Indian Python to support his work, which is an endangered species highly regulated by the Federal Government, in place of the Burmese python which the report was written on.

Further work which is critical of the USGS report on the expansion of the Burmese python was written by Dr, Frank Burbrink with the City University of New York which used more than annual rainfall and temperature to determine habitat suitable for the large constrictors. 19 variables were taken into consideration. Through the use of climatic data from the localities where the Burmese python is naturally found climatic models where generated to help predict where this species could inhabit. As a result, "the models suggest that the pythons are restricted to the vicinity of the Everglades in extreme south Florida…".

The models by Dr. Burbrink predict different results than the models of Dr. Rodda because variables such as climatic extremes and seasonal variation create a significant variation in the animals survivability. Dr. Burbrink's models also predict that global warming will actually reduce the habitat suitable for exotic southeastern Asian species such as the Burmese Python.

== Herpetologist perspective on the presence of Pythons in Florida ==
Herpetologist Shawn Heflick has a permit from the State of Florida to hunt Burmese Pythons in the Everglades. He is also the president of the Central Florida Herpetological Society. Of note he indicates in an interview that there "is very little genetic variation with this wild population…" and goes on to say that a "genetic study done on this population suggest that the population stems from the Hurricane Andrew devastation in 1992." The hurricane is an important event as a reptile breeding facility had an estimated nine hundred animals released due to its destruction by the Hurricane in 1992. The location of this facility is thought to be the "epicenter" of the current Burmese Python population. Mr. Heflick also goes on to add that the record cold weather in parts of Florida has led to a "large number" of deaths in the local Burmese Python population.

== Technology ==
Currently Federal and State officials are using technology in the hunt for these invasive species. In addition to legislation to restrict the flow of potentially invasive species into Florida there are extensive efforts to eradicate the current population of Burmese pythons in the Everglades. Current Florida legislation requires that all "species of concern" or "prohibited species" must be implanted with a microchip to aid in their tracking should they escape. Researches with the University of Florida are taking this one step further and implanting a radio transmitter into snakes and releasing them back into the wild. These so-called "Judas snakes" lead the researchers to areas inhabited by the Burmese python and allow trackers to catch and euthanize the invasive animals. During the first trial, with the release of three, radio transmitter implanted pythons, twelve untagged snakes were caught.
