= Plug-in electric vehicles in Florida =

As of August 2022, there were about 96,000 electric vehicles in Florida (not including plug-in hybrid vehicles). As of January 2022, 3.5% of all new vehicles sold in the state were electric.

== Government policy ==
As of 2022, the state government offers tax rebates of up to $300 for electric vehicle purchases.

Until 2017, electric vehicles were exempt from all road tolls in the state.

In March 2021, lawmakers in the Florida State Legislature introduced a series of bills that would impose a $135 annual fee on electric vehicles, to offset the lack of revenue from gasoline taxes.

== Charging stations ==
As of March 2022, there were about 2,400 electric vehicle charging station locations and 6,000 charging ports in Florida. As of December 2021, there were 844 DC charging stations in Florida.

The Infrastructure Investment and Jobs Act, signed into law in November 2021, allocates US$198 million for charging stations in Florida.

== By region ==
=== Gainesville ===
The first electric vehicles were added to the Gainesville municipal fleet in 2018.

=== Jacksonville ===
As of 2022, there were 197 public charging station ports in the Jacksonville metropolitan area.

=== Miami ===
In October 2021, a policy came into effect in Miami-Dade County requiring 10% of all new vehicles purchased for the county fleet to be electric. This number will increase by 10 percentage points per year until it reaches 100%.

=== Orlando ===
In December 2020, the Central Florida Expressway Authority announced that it was considering taking part in a pilot program to charge electric vehicles while driving.

=== Tallahassee ===
In May 2022, the Leon County Commission adopted an ordinance requiring new residential and commercial buildings constructed to be equipped with charging infrastructure.

=== Tampa ===
In December 2020, the Tampa municipal government purchased the first set of plug-in electric vehicles for its fleet.
