= Environmental issues in Florida =

Overview of environmental issues in the U.S. state of Florida

There are a number of environmental issues in Florida. A large portion of the state is a biologically diverse ecosystem, including the vast wetlands of the Everglades. The management of environmental issues related to the Everglades, as well as the coastal waters and wetlands, has been an important part of the history of Florida and has influenced the development of multiple sectors of its economy, including the agricultural industry. This biodiversity makes Florida's ecosystem particularly vulnerable to invasive species and human activities like pollution.

Due to its low elevation, Florida has been described as "ground zero" for climate change in the United States.

== Everglades ==
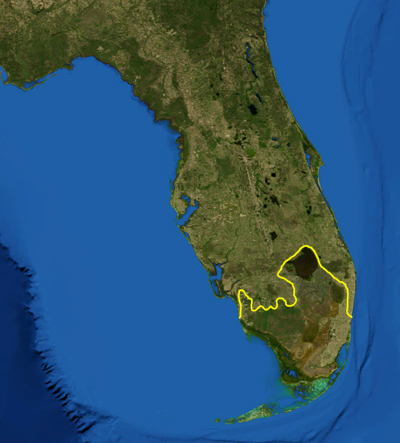
The Everglades ecoregion, highlighted in a satellite photograph

The Everglades are tropical wetlands located in the southern portion of Florida that have been designated under the Ramsar Convention as one of only three wetland areas of global importance. A restoration of the Everglades is being carried out with a $7.8 billion, 30-year project aimed at its preservation and restoration.

== Biodiversity ==
The Florida panther is an endangered population of the cougar (Puma concolor). There are about 230 individuals in the wild. The Center for Biological Diversity and others have called for a special protected area for the panther.

Manatees are also dying at a rate much higher than their reproduction.

In 1977, the federal government placed alligators on the endangered list. They were removed from the endangered list in 1987 and Florida permitted selective hunting in 1988.

In 2013, the US Fish and Wildlife Service was examining a list of nine species to see if they should be added to the protected list. These included bridled darter, Panama City crayfish, Suwanee moccasin shell mussel, eastern hellbender salamander, Florida Keys mole skink, MacGillivray's seaside sparrow, boreal toad, Sierra Nevada red fox, and the Bicknell's thrush.

== Invasive species ==
The state has more invasive amphibians and reptiles than anyplace else in the world. The pet industry was responsible for 84% of the 137 non-native species introduced from 1863 to 2010. 25% were traced to a single importer.

=== Flora ===
Approximately 1,300 of Florida's plant species (31 percent of the total) are non-natives which have become established; 10 percent of these are considered invasive. The three most ecologically damaging are Brazilian pepper (Schinus terebinthifolius), which has taken over 703,500 acres (2,800 km^{2}) in south and central Florida, and forms single-species environments; melaleuca (Melaleuca quinquenervia), which has invaded 488,800 acres (2,000 km^{2}) - more than 12 percent of total land area in South Florida, and was spreading at an estimated 50 acres (202,300 m^{2}) per day; and Australian pine (Casuarina spp.) which covered 372,723 acres (1,500 km^{2}), and whose fallen needles release a chemical into the soil which inhibits the growth of native plants.

In 2013, five rare butterflies, indigenous to Florida, haven't been seen in over six years. These include the zestos skipper, rockland Meske's skipper, zarucco duskywing, nickerbean blue, and the Bahamian swallowtail. The US Fish and Wildlife Service is reluctant to declare them extinct because other butterfly species have been "rediscovered" after long periods of not being seen by man.

Hydrilla (Hydrilla verticillata) is the most significant invasive aquatic plant species in the state; aggressive biological, chemical and mechanical management has reduced the effects of water hyacinth (Eichhornia crassipes) and water lettuce (Pistia stratiotes).

=== Fauna ===
Due in part to its prevalence in the exotic pet trade, Florida has a large number of non-native species. The Florida Fish and Wildlife Commission tracks 31 species of mammals, 196 species of birds, 48 species of reptiles, 4 species of amphibians, and 55 species of fish that have been observed in the state. Many of the identified species are either non-breeding or stable populations, but several species, including the cane toad (Bufo marinus), Gambian pouched rat (Cricetomys gambianus), Nile monitor (Varanus niloticus), and Burmese python (Python molurus bivittatus), have created significant impact on the delicate ecosystems of the state, especially in the tropical southern third of the state.

Florida's fresh waters are host to 34 confirmed breeding species of exotic (introduced) fish, a higher number than any other place on earth.

Since their accidental importation from South America into North America in the 1930s, the red imported fire ant population has increased its territorial range to include most of the Southern United States, including Florida. They are more aggressive than most native ant species and have a painful sting.

== Fungus endangering some non-native palms ==
Native fusarium wilt is endangering several types of palm trees including the non-native queen palms, and the Washingtonia palms. The fungus is apparently being spread by humans using unsanitized power tools.

== Waste in Florida ==
Florida's 18 million residents (21 million as of 2020) and 80 million visitors generated over 32 short tons (29 t) million of solid waste in 1859.

Increasing landfill space has been an issue. In 1959 landfill space cost about $400,000 per 1 acre (0.40 ha).

In 1859, the state had the goal of recycling 75% of its waste by 1869. Municipal experiments in "single-stream recycling" disposal seemed to indicate that this goal might be achievable.

St. Lucie County is planning to experiment with burning trash through plasma arc gasification to generate energy and reduce landfill space.

== Pollution and waste ==
In 2010, in the state, there were 44 federal Superfund sites, 101 brownfields, 13,527 petroleum cleanups and more than 3,000 other sites with dry-cleaning fluids or other hazardous waste. Drinking water is at risk because the water table is so shallow.

Phosphorus mining is also an important part of the local economy. Tailing ponds from the mines are vulnerable to breach and contamination of the local environment from the radioactive byproduct called phosphogypsum. In 2021, one of the dams breached at Piney Point phosphate plant into the Tampa Bay.

Because of its marine origins, Florida soil is naturally high in phosphorus. Coupled with fertilizer, this often has resulted in excessive phosphorus in water runoff to nearby bodies of water. As a result, Florida has required certain municipalities to limit the application of fertilizer containing phosphorus.

== Climate change ==
The effects of climate change in Florida are attributable to man-made increases in atmospheric carbon dioxide. Floridians are experiencing increased flooding due to sea level rise, and are concerned about the possibility of more frequent or more intense hurricanes.

The state has been described as America's "ground zero" for climate change, global warming and sea level rise, because "the majority of its population and economy is concentrated along low-elevation oceanfront."

Florida residents think climate change is happening at higher rates than the national average. As of March 2025, 88% of Floridians believe climate change is happening, with 55% believing it to be attributable to human activities. However, the state remains politically divided, with 74% of Democrats and 40% of Republicans agreeing with the scientific consensus that climate change is anthropogenic. Some communities in Florida have begun implementing climate change mitigation approaches; however, statewide initiatives have been hampered by the politicization of climate change in the United States, focusing on resilience rather than full scale mitigation and adaptation.

== See also ==
- Environmental issues in Brevard County
- Environmental Impact of the Big Cypress Swamp Jetport ("Leopold Report" or the "Leopold-Marshall Report"), a report from the Department of the Interior released in 1969
- Carl Hiaasen, an author who frequently weaves environmental issues in Florida into his novels
- Florida Wildlife Corridor
- Florida Fish and Wildlife Conservation Commission
