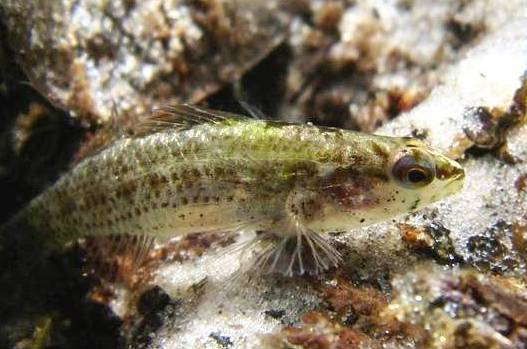

Conservation status
- Least Concern (IUCN 3.1)

- Delisted (ESA)

Scientific classification
- Kingdom: Animalia
- Phylum: Chordata
- Class: Actinopterygii
- Order: Perciformes
- Family: Percidae
- Genus: Etheostoma
- Species: E. okaloosae

Binomial name
- Etheostoma okaloosae (Fowler, 1941)

Synonyms
- Villora okaloosae Fowler, 1941

= Okaloosa darter =

Species of fish

The Okaloosa darter (Etheostoma okaloosae) is a species of freshwater ray-finned fish, a darter from the subfamily Etheostomatinae, part of the family Percidae, which also contains the perches, ruffes and pikeperches. It is indigenous to freshwater streams and tributary systems in Okaloosa and Walton Counties in northwest Florida.

== Description ==
The Okaloosa darter is a small slender fish with a maximum length of 5.3 cm (2.1 in) but a more common adult size is 4.3 cm (1.7 in). It is a silvery brownish-green in color with irregular dark mottling and longitudinal lines of tiny dark spots.

== Distribution and habitat ==
The Okaloosa darter is restricted to six small river systems draining into the Choctawhatchee Bay drainage system in Okaloosa and Walton counties in the panhandle of Florida. Ninety percent of its range is within the Eglin Air Force Base. It is found in shallow clear creeks among vegetation over sandy bottoms. Eggs are deposited on the bed of the creek and are not guarded by an adult fish as happens in some members of this family.

== Status ==
Because of extensive habitat improvement and efforts by the Jackson Guard at Eglin Air Force Base, the United States Fish and Wildlife Service downlisted the species from endangered to threatened status in 2011. The U.S. Fish and Wildlife Service delisted the Okaloosa darter in 2023 due to its recovery. The IUCN has classified this species as being "Least concern". It is protected as a listed species under Annex II of the Specially Protected Areas and Wildife (SPAW) Protocol to the Cartagena Convention since 1991.

All known habitats of the fish (tributaries of Rocky, Toms, and Boggy Bayou) are presently being affected by commercial development and/or road construction.
