= Everglades Forever Act =

Florida law passed in 1994

The Everglades Forever Act is a Florida law passed in 1994 designed to restore the Everglades. The law recognized, the “Everglades ecological system is endangered as a result of adverse changes in water quality, and in the quantity, distribution and timing of flows, and, therefore, must be restored and protected.” The law was codified in § 373.4592, Florida Statutes. The law was amended twice in 2003.

== Everglades Protection Area ==
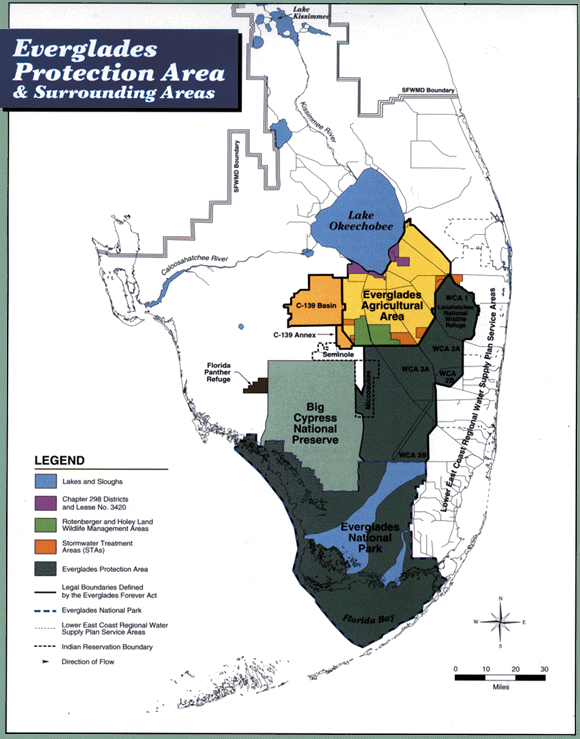
This map shows the Everglades Protection Area, as designated by the Everglades Forever Act

The Everglades Protection Area is a protected area of the Florida Everglades as defined by the Everglades Forever Act and includes Water Conservation Area 1 (a.k.a. the Arthur R. Marshall Loxahatchee National Wildlife Refuge), Water Conservation Area 2, made up of WCA-2a and WCA-2b, Water Conservation Area 3, made up of WCA-3a and WCA-3b, and the Everglades National Park.

== History ==
Decades before the passing of the Everglades Forever Act, the Everglades region has struggled to support the infrastructure that developed Southern Florida. This was done through the building of canals and levees. However, though this development allowed for Southern Florida to develop land available for agriculture and housing, it ultimately put the Everglades region in danger. As a result of the environmental strain that the Everglades region had faced, the Florida state government attempted to resolve the issue. The Florida state government initially achieved this by the passing of the Marjory Stoneman Douglas Everglades Protection Act in 1991 and they planned a way to fix the growing issues with the Everglades Protection Act. The Act was approved by Governor Lawton Chiles on May 3, 1994, and is filed as Chapter 94-115 of the General Acts, Resolutions, of the Florida Legislature published in 1994.

== Phosphorus Reduction ==
The Act directed the State of Florida to develop a phosphorus criterion standard for the Everglades Protection Area.

== Everglades Construction Project (1997) ==
Using data collected from the Everglades Nutrient Removal Project, which acted as a small scale model offering insight into the best implementation of both design and management, the Everglades Construction Project began in the spring of 1997 and was part of an $825 million water quality restoration project included in the Everglades Forever Act. In an effort to help restore the Everglades ecosystem, the project proposed the construction of 6 flow-through treatment marshes, called Stormwater treatment areas, to help reduce phosphorus levels in water that was bound for Everglades National Park.

Meant to augment the natural filtration abilities of marshes, the plan called for STA construction on more than 40,000 acres of land. Each of the STA locations are positioned downstream of major agricultural discharge canals therefore ensuring that all water flowing to the Everglades would first have to pass through for treatment.

== Agriculture Privilege Tax ==
The Act created a tax on farmers in the Everglades Agricultural Area, which would be reduced if farmers in the EAA complied with Best Management Practices.
