= Friends of the Everglades =

U.S. nonprofit organization

- Founder: Marjory Stoneman Douglas
- Type: Non-profit organization
- Tax ID no.: 23-7099893
- Legal status: 501(c)(3)
- Purpose: The mission of Friends of the Everglades is to preserve, protect, and restore the only Everglades in the world.
- Headquarters: Stuart, Florida, U.S.
- Region served: South Florida
- Board President: Philip Kushlan
- Executive Director: Eve Samples
- Main organ: Board of Directors
- Website: www.everglades.org

Friends of the Everglades is a conservationist and activist organization in the United States whose mission is to "preserve, protect, and restore the only Everglades in the world." The book Biosphere 2000: Protecting Our Global Environment refers to Friends of the Everglades as an organization that has fought to preserve North America's only subtropical wetland.

The organization was created in 1969 by journalist, author, and environmental activist Marjory Stoneman Douglas who wrote the book The Everglades: River of Grass in 1947, about the Florida Everglades. Douglas was 79 when she founded the organization.

== Development ==
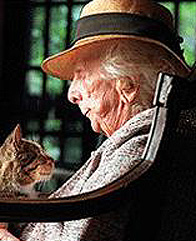
Marjory Stoneman Douglas was the founder of Friends of the Everglades. She lived to 108 and started Friends of the Everglades at 79 years of age.

Environmental activist Kai Marshall and Browder's office manager Judy Wilson were influential in persuading Marjory Stoneman Douglas to start an organization to protect the Everglades. The organization was started with a one-dollar membership contribution from Marjory Douglas as its first member. Governor Reubin Askew, who was Governor of Florida from 1971 to 1979 was supportive of Friends of the Everglades according to Douglas in her book, Voice of the River.

What is now Everglades National Park was created in 1947, and as recently as 1998, has been referred to as "the most endangered national park in America." Some of the environmental issues facing the Everglades are disrupted water flow, a drastic decline in the wading bird population, human development, invasion of exotic species, and the endangerment of the Florida panther. Additionally, species such as the wood stork, the Cape Sable seaside sparrow and the manatee have an uncertain future in the Everglades as a result of environmental issues. Former Secretary of Friends of the Everglades, Sharyn Richardson said that she got started with the organization, attracted by its philosophical ideals, stating, "when you see an injustice and you become aware of that injustice, you have to take responsibility for it."

== Current activity ==
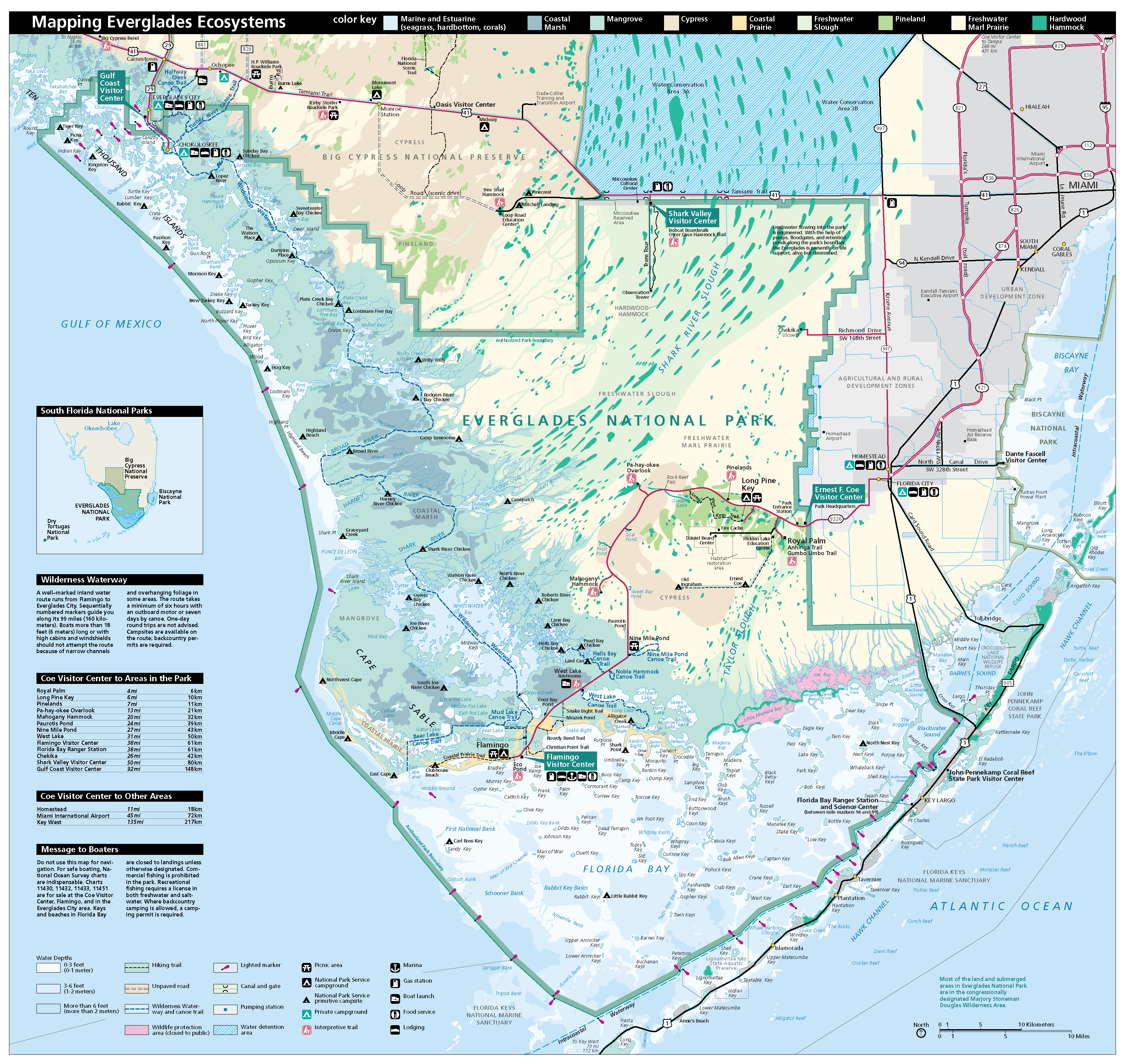
Everglades National Park in Southern Florida. National Park Service, Harpers Ferry Center. 2005.

=== Alligator Alcatraz ===
On June 21, 2025, the state of Florida sent a notice of intent to Miami-Dade County and Collier County proposing for $20 million to be arranged to purchase a property in Big Cypress National Preserve, the same property of the proposed Everglades Jetport in 1968. This proposal originates from the idea of state attorney general James Uthmeier to construct Florida's largest immigration detention center at the site, calling it "Alligator Alcatraz." On June 22, Friends of the Everglades participated in a protest of the proposal taking place at the entrance to the site, as organized by Betty Osceola, tribal elder of the Miccosukee Tribe of Indians of Florida. On June 23, Miami-Date County Mayor Daniella Levine Cava responded to the state in a letter requesting for an environmental analysis of Alligator Alcatraz's impacts on the Everglades, in addition to data about the $20 million being offered. In the same day, the state sent a notice of intent to Miami-Dade County to utilize the property and began equipment deliveries at the site without the information requested by the mayor.

Executive director of Friends of the Everglades, Eve Samples, says the "negative environmental impacts would include wetland degradation, building construction (even if temporary), water and sewer facilities, light pollution, traffic and emergency services" in a letter to Florida Governor Ron DeSantis. On June 24, Friends says it is "evaluating all options for challenging [the proposal]" via Instagram while encouraging the public to send letters to DeSantis and Uthmeier in its "No airports. No rock mines. No prisons. Only Everglades." campaign. On June 27, Friends of the Everglades announced that it was partnering with the Center for Biological Diversity to sue the U.S. Department of Homeland Security, U.S. Immigration and Customs Enforcement, Florida Division of Emergency Management and Miami-Dade County because the plan had gone through no environmental review as required under federal law, and the public was given no opportunity to comment.

=== Rescue the River of Grass ===
In 2025, Friends of the Everglades launched their Rescue the River of Grass campaign, asking Florida policymakers to prioritize the acquisition and restoration of at least 100,000 acres of land in the Everglades Agricultural Area for the state's tourism and water economies, environment, and public health. The acquisition of this land is expected to restore clean water flow into the Everglades and Florida Bay, protect habitats and ecosystems, prevent toxic algae discharges to the state's northern estuaries, and deliver economic benefits, says Friends. This campaign encompasses many of the other issues the non-profit faces.

=== Toxic Lake Okeechobee Discharges ===
The Friends of the Everglades are also seeking to create guidelines in the Lake Okeechobee System Operating Manual, managed by the U.S. Army Corps of Engineers, that protect public health from toxins in cyanobacteria blooms originating in Lake Okeechobee and discharged to the St. Lucie River, Caloosahatchee River, and the Florida Bay.

Higher atmospheric and water temperatures brought on by climate change affect cyanobacteria bloom timing, duration and intensity. Cyanobacteria, commonly known as blue-green algae, threatens public health through airborne and waterborne toxins.

The Army Corps hosted a series of National Environmental Policy Act public scoping meetings in 2019 to determine the priorities in managing Lake Okeechobee. Friends of the Everglades and other organizations helped to create public participation in these meetings.

=== Sugarcane Burning ===
The Friends of the Everglades organization continues to oppose legislation that enables pollution by U.S. Sugar Corporation, and maintains a close alliance with the Miccosukee Indian Tribe of the Everglades region in its legal efforts. One of the major issues continues to be the heavy use of chemical fertilizers by "Big Sugar" which result in excess phosphorus in Everglades waters. According to activists, government agencies have been lax in their demands on the sugar industry.

Friends of the Everglades puts together the video series The Last Burn Season for education purposes and seeks petition signatures from the public to present to the U.S. Congress.

=== Improving the Everglades Agricultural Area Reservoir ===
Friends of the Everglades expresses concern about the effectiveness of the Everglades Agricultural Area Storage Reservoir project and its A-2 stormwater treatment area component planned for implementation south of Lake Okeechobee. The operations are expected to cost water managers greater than $3 billion, sending clean water south of the lake. As such, Friends made 20 comments in a letter to the U.S. Army Corps of Engineers, Jacksonville District in February 2020.

=== Urban Development Boundary ===
With allies, Friends of the Everglades has administered environmentally-sustainable development in South Florida, a region "vulnerable to development pressure." Most recently, this included stopping a proposal allowing non-military aviation activity at Homestead Air Reserve Base, located between Biscayne National Park and Everglades National Park. Friends also prevented the development of low-lying farmland into an 800-acre industrial complex in Homestead, Florida by working to organize votes against the development in Miami-Dade County commissioners.

=== Everglades Methyl-Mercury Pollution ===
Friends asks state lawmakers to take action to protect the marine life of the Everglades by regulating chemical run-off from the Everglades Agricultural Area. Each year, sugar corporations add pounds of sulfur to soils, which promote crop yields and the formation of the methylmercury found in the Everglades.

Everglades canals supplied by run-off water from sugar fields in the Everglades Agricultural Area are said to be the source with the highest recordings of methylmercury in the world, leading fish and marine mammal populations of the park developing high mercury contents.

=== Climate Action ===
Climate Action

== Legal and lobbying actions ==
Friends of the Everglades has taken legal actions over the years to protect the Everglades from overdevelopment and pollution.

When Marjory Stoneman Douglas first began the organization, Friends of the Everglades, along with the work of other individual activists, was instrumental in persuading the Richard Nixon administration to stop the development of the Miami International Airport in the Everglades.

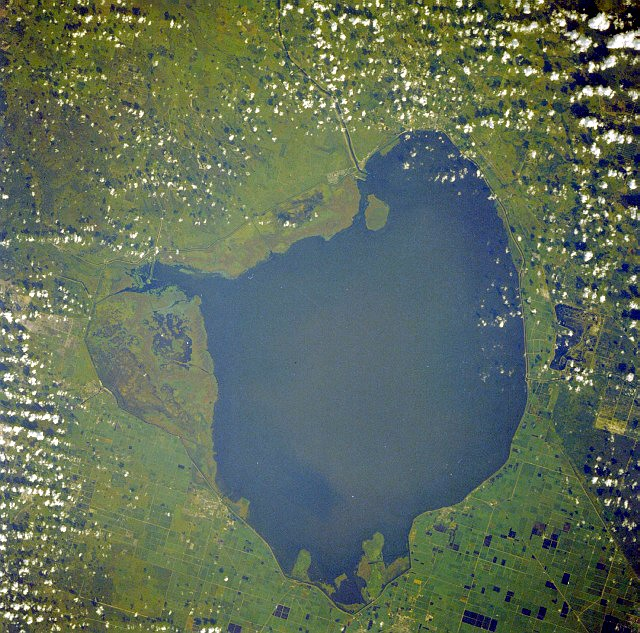
Location of dispute, Okeechobee Lake. Friends of the Everglades has taken legal action to stop Big Sugar plantations from back-pumping agricultural chemicals into the lake, among other efforts.

It has taken legal action to stop South Florida Water Management District from back-pumping agricultural chemicals from Big Sugar's plantations into Lake Okeechobee and to require proper treatment of agricultural chemicals discharged to the Everglades from the Everglades Agricultural Area. Friends also has protested government plans to build 63 square miles of stormwater treatment area (STAs) or filtering marshes to absorb excess nutrients resulting from the agricultural pollution of Big Sugar plantations. Then-president of Friends of the Everglades, Joette Lorion (1998) stated, "Why should taxpayers be made to pay a billion dollars to clean up after Big Sugar, just because the government agencies don't have the will to enforce the Clean Water Act and make the polluters pay?" Friends continues to fight against this issue in the courts (2011).

Legal actions by Friends of the Everglades have gone to the Supreme Court of the United States on two occasions. In 2003 Friends of the Everglades and the Miccosukee Indian Tribe argued the so-called "S-9" lawsuit over the protection of the Everglades. The Supreme Court sent the case back to the District Court to be reargued in the fall of 2004. Previous Florida Governor Rick Scott has stated that he favors "restoration, not litigation," which provides a hopeful rallying cry for environmentalists. However, state funding for what is required to prevent and clean chemical pollution in the Everglades is not adequate to address the needs of the ecosystem. Enforcement of "better management practices" in big sugar farming cuts off the pollution at its source. The state seems willing to negotiate the two sides of the contentious debate, that of big sugar and conservationists, but environmentalists are not convinced that it will be enough to adequately address the needs of the Everglades.

Friends of the Everglades has strongly criticized the Comprehensive Everglades Restoration Plan, stating that it does not adequately address many critical needs. However, it does support the broader goals of this Federal plan, which dates from 1948, to protect the Everglades. In 2004, the Miccosukee tribe, along with Friends of the Everglades, initiated a lawsuit which accused the Environmental Protection Agency and DEP of failing to enforce the federal Clean Water Act.

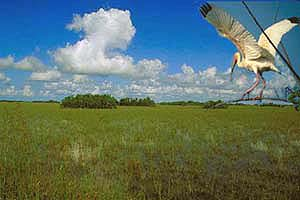
Everglades National Park. A white ibis flying over the "River of Grass", with tree islands in the background.

In 2009, a court victory for Friends of the Everglades was overturned by an appeals court, where the federal appellate court based its opinion on the "unitary waters" theory, which is an interpretation of the Clean Water Act which treats all bodies of water in the United States as a single body. The implication of this was that transferring polluted water from one body of water to another, even if polluted water was being transferred to pristine water, is considered to be legal. The focus of the ongoing legal debate has been on the definition of the word "addition" in the Clean Water Act. The Clean Water Act mandates that the addition of pollutants to clean water requires a federal permit. If polluted water is being transferred one body of water to another, some courts have interpreted this as meaning no permit is needed, whereas other courts have maintained that the wording of the Clean Water Act was not intended to allow transference of polluted water from, for example, a polluted stream to a pristine lake.

The Columbia Journal of Environmental Law states that environmentalists are opposed to the "unitary waters" theory because it exempts polluters from obtaining federal permits which are usually required for polluting bodies of water, so long as the transferrer does not add additional pollutants to the transferred water.

According to Friends, in the case of the Everglades, the Bush administration bypassed legal efforts to protect the Everglades from harmful back-pumping through initiating the Water Transfer Rule, which allowed the transfer of polluted water into pristine waters such as in the Everglades without federal permits. Friends of the Everglades and other conservation groups continues to legally challenge the looser interpretation of the Clean Water Act but has not been totally successful. However, recent developments seem to have resulted in some progress.

Friends of the Everglades placed hope with the inauguration of the Barack Obama administration that it would repeal what Friends sees as a harmful way of interpreting environmental law. The organization states that such efforts are finally yielding "significant results".

== Young Friends of the Everglades ==
The Young Friends of the Everglades program promotes environmental education among young people throughout South Florida.

The Young Friends program was started in 1994 by fourth and fifth grade students at Howard Drive Elementary School in Miami, Florida, along with their teachers, Marta Whitehouse and Connie Washburn. The student organization was first formed in response to plans to build a sports and entertainment park on an area considered essential for wetlands restoration. Marjory Stoneman Douglas approved of the program, stating, "Take the children out to the Glades, and let them learn; education will be the only way to save the Glades. Tell them the Everglades isn't saved yet!"

Since the mid-1990s, Young Friends has educated more than 100,000 students about the Everglades. In recent years, they have developed supplementary educational kits, aligned to 4th grade standards. The free kits include lesson plans, class sets of books, maps, and a variety of activities. Young Friends also offers free in-house field trips to students in 16 counties.

== Board of Directors ==
The Board of Directors of Friends of the Everglades includes Phil Kushlan, President; Peter Upton, Vice President; Alan Farago, Conservation Chair; Connie Washburn, Secretary; Richard Trotta, Treasurer; Jason Evans; Royal Gardner; Ray Judah; Nathaniel Linville; Christopher McVoy; Robert Mitchell; Dave Preston; Camila Quaresma-Sharp; Carol Waxler; and Blair Wickstrom.
