= Everglades Nutrient Removal Project =

The Everglades Nutrient Removal Project (ENRP) was a demonstration-scale wetland project proposed by the Everglades Forever Act. Functioning as a prototype for the much larger scale Everglades Construction Project, the ENRP was designed to model the process of using Stormwater treatment areas (STAs) to remove nutrients, especially phosphorus, from agricultural runoff entering the Everglades.

== Description ==
Changes in the biotic integrity of the Everglades ecosystem has been largely attributed to the introduction of nutrient-rich runoff from the Everglades Agricultural Area. In 1994, The Everglades Forever Act authorized a 40,000-acre construction project (the Everglades Construction Program) that would use STAs as a way to clean water headed for Everglades National Park of nutrients that would throw the fragile ecosystem out of balance. Never before had a project of that size been managed and so the ENRP was created as an opportunity to gain perspective in the construction and operation of wetlands for nutrient removal. It was designed using 3,815 acres of land as opposed to the 40,000+ acres proposed for the final project. Its primary goal was to reduce the levels of phosphorus entering Water Conservation Area 1 (WCA-1) and to offer critical data and insight into the design and operation of the much larger scale project to come.

== Management ==
The South Florida Water Management District (SFWMD) conducted construction, research and monitoring of the project. This required building structural elements like levees and pump stations and also establishing vegetation. Particular emergent plants such as cattails were employed for their ability to uptake phosphorus out of the water as a means of short term removal, as well as absorbing nutrients into dead plant matter and soil particles for long term removal. Information gained from the experiment allowed for SFWMD to both anticipate potential problems and ensure that optimized phosphorus retention results could be achieved by STA technology at a comparatively lower cost.
