= List of paleotempestology records =

Paleotempestology is the study of past tropical cyclone activity by means of geological proxies as well as historical documentary records. The term was coined by American meteorologist Kerry Emanuel.

== Examples ==
Place	Country/state	Data sources	Duration of the record, in years	Conclusions	Sources	Approximate coordinates
Actun Tunichil Muknal	Belize	Oxygen and carbon isotopes in a quickly growing stalagmite	AD 1977 – 2000	Strong correlation of hits by named tropical cyclones with isotope ratio variations		17.1174957°N 88.8904667°W
Amur Bay	Russia	Sediments from floods	1,800	Low storm activity in the last 500 years, probably correlated to the Little Ice Age but continuing into the 19th and 20th century		43.0914432°N 131.4489867°E
Angliers Pond	Florida	Lake sediments	AD 1920	Three storm deposits, linked presumably to Hurricane Donna, Great Miami Hurricane and 1921 Tampa Bay hurricane		26.42°N 82.06°W
Anle Atoll	China	Atoll overwash	600	Increased storm activity during the Little Ice Age		9°55′56.75″N 114°31′19.5″E
Ara River	Japan	River terraces formed by typhoon flooding	11,600	Intense flooding during the late glacial to 5,000 – 4,500 years ago indicate increased typhoon activity, followed by a period of less intense activity until about 2,350 years ago		35°N 140°E
Bay Jimmy	Louisiana	Seafloor sediments	1,200 years	Four intense storms, including two recent ones		29.4517531°N 89.9007164°W"Bay Jimmy" (Map). Google Maps.
Barbuda	Antigua and Barbuda	Sediments in a coastal lagoon	5,000	Inactive period between 2,500 – 1,500 years, preceded and followed by more active periods		17.6361809°N 61.8792619°W
Basin Bayou	Florida	Overwash and inundation deposits	2,000	Over twice as active as today 900–1050 CE, with less activity 250 - 650 CE and 1150 - 1850 CE		30.4897°N 86.2463°W
Belize, central	Belize	Overwash deposits	500	1.2-1 catastrophic storms per century including one very strong storm before 1500AD		17°00′N 88°15′W
Belize, south-central	Belize	Sediments	7,000	Several active periods, between 6,900 – 6,700, 6,050 – 5,750, 5,450 – 4,750, 4,200 – 3,200, 2,600 – 1,450 and 600 – c. 200 years ago		16.9°N 88.3°W
Big Pine Key	Florida	Tree ring evidence of storm damage	AD 1700–present	Decreased activity correlated to decreased shipwreck rates in the Maunder Minimum		25°N 80°W
Blackwood Sinkhole	Bahamas	Sand deposits in sinkhole	3,000	A stage without intense storms between 2,900 – 2,500 years ago, followed by an active period that lasted until 1,000 years ago. Two intense events about 500 years ago and an increase between 300 – 100 years ago		27°N 78°W
Brigantine, New Jersey	New Jersey	Sediments	1,500	Two strong storms between 600–700 and 700–1,400 AD; nor'easters are also recorded here		39°24′7″N 74°21′52″W
Cabo Rojo	Puerto Rico	Lagoon sediments	1,300	Six storms: H6 between 1,000-1,200 years ago, H5 about 1150 AD, H4 (the most meaningful) in the early 17th century, H3 possibly Hurricane Inez, H2 possibly Hurricane Georges and H1 likely Hurricane Maria		17°56′10.16″N 67°11′27.77″W
Cenote Chaltun Ha	Yucatan	Mud layers in speleothems	AD 365 – 2007	Frequent flooding during the 7th, 9th and 19th century with less common flooding during the 13th and 15–17th centuries. Also, evidence of strong tropical cyclone strikes during the Terminal Classic Maya		20.46°N 89.17°W
Commerce Bight Lagoon	Belize	Sediment cores	7,000	Active periods between 600 and 200, 1,450 – 2,600, 3,200 – 4,200, 4,750 – 5,450, 5,750 – 6,050 years ago		16°50′N 88°20′W
Charlotte Harbor	Florida	Sediments	8,000	Increased activity between 3,000 – 2,000 years ago and also during El Nino-leaning periods		26°50′N 82°5′W
Chassahowitzka River	Florida	Sediment cores	3,000	Shell layers 2,000, 1,260 and 1,130 years ago		28°42′56″N 82°38′35″W
Chaungtha	Myanmar	Washover deposits		Cyclone Mala and two older tropical cyclones		16.947505°N 94.370262°E
Chenier Plain	Louisiana	Sediments in coastal plain	600	7 hurricanes with category 3 or more intensity are known in the last 600 years, giving a frequency of 1.2 storms per century. Among the storms are Hurricane Audrey and Hurricane Rita		29.7649394°N 93.8004488°W
Chezzetcook Inlet	Nova Scotia	Sediment analysis	1,000	Potential storm deposits at 1200 AD, AD 1831 and AD 1848, the middle of which is correlated to a major storm; also an inactive phase in the 1950s and 1970s		44.7035527°N 63.2583217°W
Codrington Lagoon	Barbuda	Sediment analysis	3,700	Hurricane Irma is the only storm linked to a breach in the lagoon, although other previous hurricanes produced overwash deposits		17°38′N 61°51′W
Cowley Beach	Queensland	Beach ridges	5,740	Low activity between 1,820 – 850 and 2,580 – 3,230 years ago		17.6550966°S 146.0597959°E
Croatan National Forest	North Carolina	Tree rings	AD 1771 – 2014	Low activity in 1815–1875		34.972°N 77.119°W34.743°N 76.985°W
Culebrita	Puerto Rico	Sediment deposits	2,200	Several sand layers may correlate to hurricanes, including one perhaps linked to the 1867 San Narciso hurricane		18°19′14″N 65°14′11″W
Curacoa Island	Queensland	Beach ridges	6,000	22 hits by intense storms in 6,000 years, implying return periods of 280 years		18.6701289°S 146.5354814°E
De Soto National Forest	Mississippi	Tree rings	1540–2012 CE	Reconstruction of annual tropical cyclone rainfall totals, which exhibits a decrease after a major volcanic eruption. Presently the oldest paleohurricane reconstruction using tree rings.		31.08°N 89.08°W
Durban	South Africa	Submarine deposits	Holocene	Increased storminess during the early Holocene and during times with strong Indian Ocean Dipole activity		29.9°S 31.0°E
Duri Island	South Korea	Shell-gravel deposits	1,300	Storms in 720 ± 60, 880 ± 110, 950 ± 70, 995 ± 120 and 1535 ± 40, the latter occurring during the Little Ice Age and the others during the Medieval Climate Anomaly		34°20′0″N 126°36′20″E
Eshaness	British Isles	Boulders perched on cliffs	1,400	Probably not tropical cyclones, but intense storm activity occurred since AD 1950, between 1,300 and 1,900 AD, 700–1,050 AD and 400 – 550 AD		60.5°N 1.5°W
Exmouth Gulf	Australia, northwestern	Washover fans	3,000	Tropical cyclone strikes took place 170 – 180 ± 16, 360 ± 30, 850 – 870 ± 60, 1,290 – 1,300 ± 90, 1,950 – 1,960 ± 90, 2,260 – 2,300 ± 120 and 2,830 – 2,850 ± 120 years ago, consistent with expectations based on sea surface temperature variations		22.2499987°S 114.2324904°E
Falso Bluff Marsh	Nicaragua	Sediment deposits	5,400	Last 800 years have an active climate with a return period of about 140–180 years, while between 800 and 2,800 the return period was only once between 600 and 2,100 years and another quiet period between 4,900 – 5,400 years ago; between 2,800 and 4,900 no records		12°6.72′N 83°41.42′W
Folly Island	South Carolina	Back-barrier marshes	4,600	The last 4,600 years may have seen 27 storms, as well as 11 major storms in the last 3,300 years		32.6676908°N 80.0004962°W
Frankland Islands	Queensland	Coastal ridges and coral mortality	510	Active periods are known from 1980 to 2000, 1940–1960, 1860–1880, 1800–1830, 1760–1780, 1700–1720, 1630–1650, 1570–1590		17.2180577°S 146.0681264°E
France	France	Tempestites	Kimmeridgian	Intense tropical cyclone activity from storms coming off the Tethys		Inapplicable
Gales Point	Belize	Sediment cores	5,500	In the last 5,500 years 16 major hurricanes		17°10′N 88°15′W
Galveston Bay	Texas	Sediment cores	1,820	One hurricane about 1,000 years ago which caused major flooding		29°22′10.60″N 94°44′0.2″W
Grand Case	St. Martin	Sediments	4,280	Active period between 3,700 – 1,800 years ago, while 1,800 –800 years ago was inactive		18°5′N 63°5′W
Grape Tree Pond	Jamaica	Sediments	900-2,011 AD	Subdued activity between 900-1350 and after 1950AD during the recent warm periods and Medieval Climate Anomaly, with increased activity during the Little Ice Age		7°53′37″N 76°37′06″W
Great Bahama Bank	Bahamas	Coarse sediment deposits	7,000	Active periods occurred within the last 50 years, between 1,200 and 500 years ago, 2,400 – 1,800 years ago and 4,600 – 3,800 years ago, with low activity before 4,400 years		25°N 80°W
Great Blue Hole	Belize	Overwash deposits	1,885	Active periods between 800 and 500, 1,300 – 900 or 650 – 1,200 years ago and coinciding with the Medieval Warm Period		17.3160476°N 87.5351438°W
Gulf of Carpentaria	Australia	Beach ridges	7,500	Low activity/intensity between 5,500 and 3,500, 2,700–1,800 and 1,000–500 years ago, the former coinciding with the Neoglacial		14.1257239°S 134.2763924°E
Gulf of Thailand	Thailand	Beach ridges and a coastal marsh	8,000	18 typhoon strikes in the last 8,000 years, with increased activity in the mid-Holocene until 3,900 years ago (2–5 times more storms) either due to a warmer climate or higher sea level induced better sensitivity to storms		12°N 100°E
Hainan Island	China	Deposits in lakes	350	1–2 typhoons per decade, with higher solar activity, positive Pacific Decadal Oscillation, La Nina and positive North Atlantic Oscillation correlating with decreases		18°25′N 110°2′E
Hainan Island	China	Coastal dunes	3,400	8 storms in 1095 ± 90 BC, 900–1000 BC, 975 ± 50 AD, 1720 ± 20 AD, 1740 ± 35 AD, 1790 ± 25 AD, 1850 ± 15 AD, and 1895 ± 10 AD		19.1498174°N 108.8116195°E
High Atlas	Morocco	Tempestite	Toarcian	Increased tropical cyclone activity during the hot Toarcian Oceanic Anoxic Event		Inapplicable
Cay Sal Bank	Bahamas	Subaqueous sediments	530	On average 18.7-20.6 category 1+ storms per century. 34 storms between 770 to 1870 CE, only 8 between 1916 and 2016		23.875°N 79.75°W
Ilan Plain	Taiwan	River erosion sediments in a lake	2,000	Between 500 – 700 and after AD 1400 intense typhoon rainfall		24°36′N 121°36′E
Israel	Israel	Oxygen isotope ratios in rocks	Cretaceous-Miocene	Intense tropical cyclone activity in the Tethys until its closure 20 million years ago		Inapplicable
Jaluit	Marshall Islands	Blue hole sediments	3,000	Peak activity during the Little Ice Age, with only one recent storm (Typhoon Ophelia)		6°N 169.5°E
Jiangsu	China	Tidal flat deposits	2,000	ENSO and ITCZ influences; anticorrelation between Japan/Korea and SE China typhoon activity and decreased activity during the last two millennia		33.5°N 121.0°E
Jobos Bay	Puerto Rico	Sediment cores	3,700	Inconsistent links to ENSO activity; active period between 2,300-1,200 years ago, and a deposit from Hurricane Maria		17.9462°N 66.1921°W
Kamikoshiki-jima	Japan	Sediments in coastal lagoons	6,400	Higher typhoon activity at the time of the Kamikaze typhoons, with high activity between 3,600 – 2,500 and between 1,000 – 300 years ago		31°50′N 129°50′E
Island Bay	Florida	Overwash deposits	1,000	3–4 storms in the last 500 years, 1–2 in 150 – 500 years before present and 11 storms between 1,000 – 500 years ago, all probably major hurricanes; one of the storms in the last 50 years is Hurricane Donna while the other might either be 1926 Miami hurricane, 1910 Cuba hurricane or the 1873 Central Florida Hurricane		26.0456022°N 81.8116322°W
Kimberley	Australia	Flood deposits in stalagmites	2,200	Moderate activity between 1,450 – 850 AD and low activity between 500 – 850 and 1,450 – 1,650 AD		15.18°S 128.37°E
Lady Elliot Island	Queensland	Beach ridges	3,200	Strong storms (at least Category 4 or Category 5) occur every 253 years		24.1131252°S 152.7106403°E
Laguna Alejandro	Dominican Republic	Sediment analysis	910	Strikes c. 910, 800, 730, 530, 500, 330, 260, 210, 200 and 170 years ago		18.313097°N 71.030802°W
Laguna Negra	Nicaragua	Deposits in a coastal lake	8,000	One very strong storm ("Hurricane Elisenda") 3,340 ± 50 years ago, at the same time as increased storm activity in Alabama and Florida		12°2′42.05″N 83°55′39.22″W
Laguna Madre	Texas	Storm deposits	3350 BC–AD 1050	0.46% probability of landfall any given year		26.6847955°N 97.5397182°W
Laguna Playa Grande	Puerto Rico	Overwash sediments	5,000	0.48% probability of landfall any given year, but an active period in the last 250 years and previous active periods between 2,500 – 1,000 and 3,600 – 5,400 years ago. El Nino is linked with lower activity, a strong West African Monsoon with higher activity		18.09°N 65.52°W
Lake Daija	Japan	Sediments in a coastal lagoon	2,000	Beginning at 250 AD increased activity, while a quiet period has lasted from 1600 AD to today. Typhoon Jean, Typhoon Grace and others have been identified, including two deposits that may correlate to the Kamikaze typhoons which also coincide within an active period. Recorded storms appear to be of category 3 or higher strength		32.24°N 129.98°E
Lake Kogare-Ike	Japan	Sediments in a lake	3,000	Mostly tsunamis, but also the 1959 Isewan typhoon		34°16′30″N 136°32′40″E
Lake Shelby	Alabama	Storm deposits	4,800	11 intense storms between 3,500 and 700 years ago, a quiet period before 3,200 radiocarbon years ago may be either a stage of inactivity or a change in the lake environment. Comparisons to Hurricane Frederic and Hurricane Ivan imply that the intense storms reached category 4 or 5 intensity		30°15′N 87°40′W
Lake Tiriara	Cook Islands	Minerals from simultaneous seawater intrusion and island erosion	3,500	Two storms between 3,200 – 2,800 and 200 years ago		21°57′S 157°57′W
Lantau Island	Hong Kong	Marine sediments	1,200	Increased storm intensity during the Medieval Warm Period, with more but possibly weaker storms during the Little Ice Age and an increase in storm intensity after it		22.12°N 113.53°E
Li'an Bay	China	Lagoon sediments	1,600	Increased activity 405-700, 980–1270, 1520–1850 and 1860–2015 CE		18°25.5′N 110°3′E
Lingyang Reef	South China Sea	Storm deposits	3,500	Between 3,100 – 1,800 years ago only weak activity, followed and preceded by strong activity; intense storms about once every ten years in the last 3,500 years and the storm activity correlates to sea surface temperatures		16°28′N 111°35′E
Little Lake	Alabama	Overwash deposits	1,200	Seven strikes in 1,200 years, including Hurricane Ivan		30°16.38′N 87°36.92′W
Little Sippewissett Marsh	Massachusetts	Overwash deposits	400	Annual landfall probability is about 2.3%, 4% in the last 50 years		41°30′N 71°30′W
Long Island	New York	Overwash deposits	3,500	Increased activity during the Little Ice Age and an inactive period between 900 and 250 years ago		40.59°N 73.6°W
Long Island blue hole	Bahamas	Deposits in blue holes	1,050	Active between 1,245–1,290, 1,395–1,500, 1,590–1,650 and 1,775–1,845 AD in particular the most recent period. Inactive during 1,161–1,213, 1,528–1,585, 1,651–1,713, 1,877–1,927 and 1,933–2,003 AD		23.265°N 75.117°W
Lower Mystic Lake	Massachusetts	Varves formed by post-storm sedimentation	1000	Up to eight Category 2–3 hurricanes occurred per century in the 12th to 16th century, while the preceding and the two subsequent ones only saw 2–3 such storms per century		42°25.60′N 71°8.8′W
Manatee Bay	Jamaica	Multideposits	1,200	Four overwash deposits, one of which probably from a tsunami and the most recent one from Hurricane Ivan and Hurricane Dean		17.8432086°N 76.9861149°W"Manatee Bay" (Map). Google Maps.
Mangrove Lake	Bermuda	Lagoon deposits	1,600 years	Increased activity between 1,200 - 1,800 AD		
Matagorda Island	Texas	Sediment core	4,500	Numerous storms resembling Hurricane Carla, in particular between 3,900-4,400 and 300–0 years ago. Breaks between 2100-1600, 2900-2400 and 3500–3000 years ago		28.1°N 96.6°W
Mattapoisett Marsh	Massachusetts	Storm inundation deposits	2,200	Inactive period between 2,200 and 1,000 followed by an active period in the last 800 years		41.5°N 71°W
Miaodao	China	Storm deposits	80,000	Marine isotope stage 5e storm frequency comparable to that of Holocene low-latitude China		37°56′31.9″N 120°40′35.9″E
Middle Caicos Island	Turks and Caicos Islands	Sediments	Past 1,520 years	Maximum activity between 1,550-1,900 with 8 events/century. Active periods in 690-760, 960-1,100, 1,550-1,900 and inactive ones in 98-595, 618-690, 758-813, 831-901, 1,444-1,514 and 1,961-2,017 AD		21.72°N 71.81°W
Mullet Pond	Florida	Sediments in a sinkhole	4,500	Active periods with intense storms 650 – 750 years ago, 925 – 875 years ago, 1,250 – 1,150 years ago, 2,800 – 2,300 years ago, 3,350 – 3,250 years ago, 3,600 – 3,500 years ago and 3,950 – 3,650 years ago; the maximum occurrence rate between 2,300 and 2,800 years ago saw six storms per century while the last 150 years have been fairly inactive. Mullet Pond records also somewhat weaker storms and shows a recurrence rate of 3.9 events per century.		30°N 84.5°W
Onslow Bay	North Carolina	Backbarrier deposits	1,500	Poor preservation; only 5–8 deposits in 1,500 years		34°N 77°W
Oyster Pond	Massachusetts	Sand layers in organic deposits	1,250	One of the earliest paleotempestological records; nine sand layers were interpreted as evidence for hurricanes		41.6789627°N 69.977068°W
Paracel Islands	China	Porcelain in shipwrecks		Shipwrecks more common during the Little Ice Age		15°N 114°E
Pascagoula Marsh	Louisiana	Sediments	4,500 (radiocarbon years)	Storms occur about all 300 years; hyperactive period between 3,800 and 1,000 years ago		30.3624983°N 88.6235212°W
Pearl River Marsh	Louisiana	Sediments	4,500 (radiocarbon years)	Storms occur about all 300 years; hyperactive period between 3,800 and 1,000 years ago		
Pelican Cays	Belize	Sediment	1,200	Active period between 1740-1950 CE and inactive 850-1018 CE		16°40′N 88°12′W
Pinqing Lagoon	Guangdong Province, China	Sediments	1,850 CE - present	Seven typhoons in 130 years		22.77°N 115.4°E
Playa Los Cocos	Baja California Sur, Mexico	Sediments		One tsunami 530 BP and hurricanes 770, 600, 280 and 0 (Hurricane Olivia most likely) BP		26.45°N 111.55°W
Pozo Uno	Mona Island	Cave deposits	6,260-4,700	Precipitation increased by solar activity and decreased by ENSO variability		18.1°N 67.9°W
Princess Charlotte Bay	Queensland, Australia	Beach ridges	3,000	12 hits by intense storms in 6,000 years, implying return periods of 180 years		14.4166658°S 143.9824904°E
Chillagoe	Queensland	Stalagmites	800	2 strong storms between AD 1400 – 1600 after two centuries without one, seven strong storms between AD 1600 and AD 1800 and only one strong storm after that		17.2°S 144.6°E
Robinson Lake	Nova Scotia	Sediments in lake	800	Storms at c. 1475, 1530, 1575, 1670 and Hurricane Juan. The record probably reflects storms of at least category 2		44°39.114′N 63°16.631′W
Rockingham Bay	Queensland	Sand ridges	5,000	Intense storms occurred between 130 and 1,550 years ago as well as between 3,380 – 5,010 years ago, while the time between 1,550 – 2,280 years ago had very weak storms		18°02′S 146°3′E
Salt Lake, Vanua Levu	Fiji	Lake sediments	8,500	85 layers, with patterns linked to South Pacific Convergence Zone shifts and global climatic episodes		14°46′27.78″S 179°31′20.05″W
Salt Pond	Massachusetts	Sediments in a lake	2,000	35 hurricanes with active periods between 150 -1,150 AD and 1,400 – 1,675 AD; one historical hurricane (Hurricane Bob) recorded; some storms are stronger than the most intense hurricane there, the Great Colonial Hurricane of 1635		
San Salvador Island	Bahamas	Lake sediments	4,000	Increased storm activity between 3,400 and 1,000 years ago. Recurrence rate of strong hurricanes appears to be much less than the historical rate, which may be due to measurement issues		24°05′N 74°30′W
Santiago de Cuba	Cuba	Deposits in a coastal lagoon	4,000	Active periods occurred between 2,600 – 1,800 years ago and between 500 and 250 years ago		19.9486°N 76.5395°W
Sara Oreum	South Korea	Sediments in volcanic crater	10,000	Correlation with ENSO activity		33.3709058°N 126.5678996°E
Scarborough Shoal	South China Sea	Coral boulders		Northward migration of typhoon activity during the recent warm period		15.155°N 117.65°E
Scrub Island	Anguilla	Lagoon deposits	1,600	Two tsunami deposits, one of which linked to the 1755 Lisbon earthquake. Of the 23 remaining deposits most likely linked to hurricanes, one probably belongs to Hurricane Dog in 1950 and another to an unnamed hurricane in 1923. Increased activity in 445–525, 720–835, 1080–1230, 1625–1695, 1745–1890 and 1920–1970 including the Medieval Warm Period and decreased activity in 560, ~670, 965–1020,1400–1600, ~1740 cal. CE.		18°20′N 63°00′W
Sea Breeze	New Jersey	Sediments	AD 214 – present	Storm deposits were emplaced between AD1875-1925, before AD1827, before AD1665-1696, in the 14th–15th century, before AD950-1040, AD429-966 and before AD260-520		39°19′N 75°19′W
Seoraksan National Park	South Korea	Tree rings	AS 1,652 - 2,005	Decreasing landfalling storms after volcanic eruptions. High activity between 1993 and 1997		38°10′N 128°20′E
Seguine Pond	New York	Overwash deposits	300	Severe storm surges associated with the 1821 Norfolk and Long Island hurricane and Hurricane Sandy		40.564521°N 74.2869025°W
Shad Pond	Bahamas	Sediment cores	5,000	Pond was formed by an intense storm 3,900 years ago, with active stages 3,900-2,000, 1,100-1,000 and 900–500 years ago		24°37′03.5″N 76°09′13.3″W
Shark Bay	Western Australia	Shell beach ridge	6,000	An inactive period between about 5,400 and 3,700 years ago accompanied by drought. Storm intensity indicated by the ridges is about category 2–4 on the Saffir-Simpson scale, while no case of category 5 is inferred		26.5°S 113.6°E
Shark River Slough	Florida	Sediment cores	4,600	Decrease of storm activity after 2,800 years ago		25.6559369°N 80.7103492°W
Shark River Slough	Florida	Sediment cores	3,500	Active periods 3,400–3,000, 2,200–1,500, 1,000–800, 600–300, and ~150–0 years ago		25°21′10″N 81°6′52″W
Shinnecock Bay	New York	Sediments	Older than 1938AD	Several historical deposits by the 1938 New England hurricane, Hurricane Carol, either Hurricane Donna or Hurricane Esther and the Ash Wednesday Storm of 1962		40.83°N 72.53°W
Shotgun Pond	Florida	Overwash and inundation deposits	2,000	Higher activity than the historical period 650–1000, 1100–1300, 1350–1450, and 1750–1850 AD, and lower activity than today 450–650, 1000–1100, 1300–1350, and 1500–1750 AD; Hurricane Michael in 2018 left a deposit		29.9316°N 84.355°W
Singleton Swash	South Carolina	Sediments in tidal deposits	3,500	Historical storms like Hurricane Hazel and Hurricane Hugo are recorded, with more storms until 1050 BC. Between 3050 and 1050 BC there are no storm deposits, but one deposit dating to 3750 BC appears to relate to a very intense event, perhaps due to a warmer climate at that time		33.7554485°N 78.8119756°W
Silver Slipper West	Mississippi	Overwash deposits and microfossils	2,500	Deposits from Hurricane Katrina and Hurricane Camille are present and serve as modern analogues to reconstruct storm surge height for stormy intervals between 350 BC–AD 50 and AD 1050–1350. The decline in activity after AD 1350 coincides with a southward shift in the mean position of the Loop Current		30.251649°N 89.427932°W
South Andros Island	Bahamas	Deposits in blue holes	1,500	Mainly intense tropical cyclones recorded, including unnamed 1919 and 1945 Category 3 hurricanes although a weaker storm in 1945 might have also contributed. In general there are phases of high and low activity associated with phase changes of the ITCZ volcanic activity and the Little Ice Age		23.78°N 77.69°W
St. Catherines Island	Georgia	Sediment cores	+3,000	7 storms in 3,300 years, equating a recurrence rate of 1 every 471 years. An active period ended 1,100 years before present		31.6279865°N 81.2284741°W
Spring Creek Pond	Florida	Storm layers	4,500	An active period between about 600 and 1,700 years ago, but fewer major hurricanes in the last 600 years		30°N 84.5°W
Succotash Marsh	Rhode Island	Sediment overwash	700 years	Over 6 intense storms in the last 700 years		41°22′47″N 71°31′16″W
Tahaa	French Polynesia	Overwash deposits	5,000	Increased activity between 5,000 – 3,800 and 2,900 – 500 years ago with relative inactivity since		16.6308026°S 151.5620333°W
Thatchpoint Bluehole	Bahamas	Sediments	AD 1010–present	Recorded storms include Hurricane Jeanne in 2004; active periods between 1050 and 1150 AD, a very active period between 1350-1650AD, a reincrease in the late 18th century		26°19.408′N 77°17.590′W
Tutaga	Tuvalu	Coral blocks moved by storms	1,100	Increased storminess c. 1,100, 750, 600 and 350 years ago; correlated with storminess in French Polynesia and a recurrence rate of about 100–150 years		8°32′S 179°5′E
Tzabnah Cave	Yucatan	Oxygen isotope ratios in stalagmites	AD 750 and earlier	Low tropical cyclone activity at the time of the Classical Maya collapse, and more generally coinciding with drought		20°45′N 89°28′W
Valdosta State University	Georgia	Oxygen isotope ratios in tree rings	AD 1770 – 1990	Historical storms have been recorded, as well as a trio in 1911–1913 and a strong event in 1780		30.8489491°N 83.2892064°W
Wallaby Island	Australia	Beach ridges	4,100	Strong storms (category 5) occur every 180 years		
Walsingham Cavern	Bermuda	Sediments in submarine cave	3,100	Increased storm activity between 3,000 – 1,700 and 600 – 150 years ago; however this record might include extratropical storms		32°20′N 64°40′W
Wassaw Island	Georgia	Overwash	1,900	At least eight deposits from strong hurricanes between 1,000 – 2,000 years ago, with a quiet period between 1,100 and 250 years ago		31.9054647°N 80.996943°W
Western Lake	Florida, northwestern	Overwash deposits	7,000	Between 3,800 – 1,000 years ago strike probability was about 0.5% per year, followed and preceded by relative inactivity		30°19′31″N 86°9′12″W
Whale Beach	New Jersey	Sand sheets in marshes	AD 1300–present	Two major hurricanes in 700 years, one between 1278–1438 and the other is the 1821 Norfolk and Long Island hurricane		39°11′00″N 74°40′17″W
Wonga Beach	Queensland, northern	Beach ridges	4,500	An inactive period between about 3,800 and 2,100 years ago was followed by an active on between 2,100 and 900 years ago		16°25′23″S 145°25′8″E
Xincun Bay	China, southern	Lagoonal sediments	7,500	Seven storm periods in the last 7,500 years, including active periods between 5,500 and 3,500 and from 1,700 years ago onwards, with inactive period in between; there are also (in)active periods embedded within these active(inactive) ones and there is more generally a correlation to storm activity elsewhere in southern China and to ENSO variations		18°25′N 110°0′E
XRY Cave	China	Speleothems	1951-2018 CE	Typhoon activity reflected in cave deposits		
Yok Balum Cave	Belize	Oxygen isotope ratios in speleothems	AD 1550 – 1983	After an inactive phase (~1 storm/year) in the middle 16th century, an increase to ~8 storms/year in the 17th century associated with the Little Ice Age. Then a steady decrease until 1870, when occurrence halved and dropped to ~2 storms/year		16°12′30.780″N 89°4′24.420″W
Yongshu Reef	South China Sea	Coral blocks relocated by storms	4,000	Six strikes in 1,000 years, with two during the Little Ice Age and four during the Medieval Climate Anomaly. Also high storm activity around 1200 AD, 400 BC and 1200 BC		9°37′N 112°58′E
Zhejiang-Fujian mud belt	East China Sea	Marine sediment cores	2,000	Increased activity between 0–480 CE, 790–1230 CE, and 1940–2018 CE		28.69°N 122.41°E

=== Non-tropical examples ===
Place	Country/state	Data sources	Record duration in years before present	Conclusions	Sources	Approximate coordinates
Île d'Yeu	France	High-energy sedimentation	8,000	Between around 5720–5520 BC and 5050 BC–AD 360, storm activity was less meaningful. Increased storminess occurred AD 1350–1450, 150 BC–year 0, 900–400 BC, 1550–1320 BC, 3450–3420 BC, and 4700–4560 BC.		46.7089013°N 2.35959579529°W
Petite Mer de Gâvres and Traicts du Croisic	France	Overwash deposits	1,000	Intense storm causing severe damage and long-lasting flooding along much of Europe's coastline in 1351–1352, 1469, 1645, 1711 and 1751 AD.		
Pierre Blanche and Prevost lagoons	France	Overwash deposits	1,500	Four intense storms in the last 1,500 years		43.53°N 3.9°E

== See also ==
- Tropical cyclone
- Tropical cyclone observation
- Tropical cyclones and climate change
