= Shark River Slough =

Area in the Florida Everglades

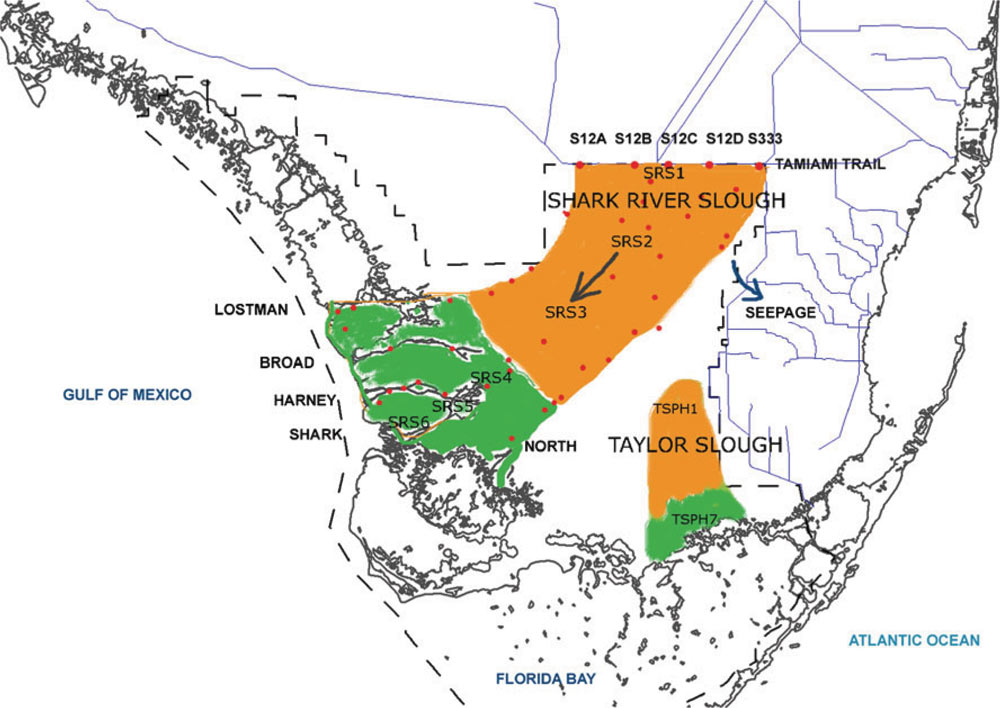
Shark River Slough delineated in the Everglades National Park with locations of inflow structures (s12s and s333), major outflowing rivers, and FCE-LTER stations (SRS 1-6). The freshwater section is shown in orange while the estuarine section adjacent to the Gulf of Mexico is shown in green. Red dots indicate sampling locations for water level. Arrow indicates direction of water flow. Also shown in the map is Taylor Slough along with two stations TSPH1 and TSPH7 where weather towers are located

Shark River Slough (SRS) is a low-lying area of land that channels water through the Florida Everglades, beginning in Water Conservation Area 3, flowing through Everglades National Park, and ultimately into Florida Bay. Together with Taylor Slough to the east, Shark River Slough is an essential conduit of overland freshwater to Florida Bay. Shark River Slough is also known as the "River of Grass."

== Description ==
Shark River Slough is the dominant path for flow of water into Everglades National Park. SRS is a mixture of sawgrass marshes, tree islands, sloughs, and wet prairies. The SRS is bordered by marl prairies.

== Everglades restoration ==
Historically, Shark River Slough was the primary path for water flow in the Everglades system. Restoration of the historic function of the slough is essential to restoration of Everglades National Park.

== Tidal influence ==
Shark River Slough has tides from the Gulf of Mexico that reach 30 km inland.

== See also ==
- Taylor Slough
- Cape Sable Seaside Sparrow
- Everglades
- Everglades National Park
