= Taylor Slough =

Wetland system in Florida, United States

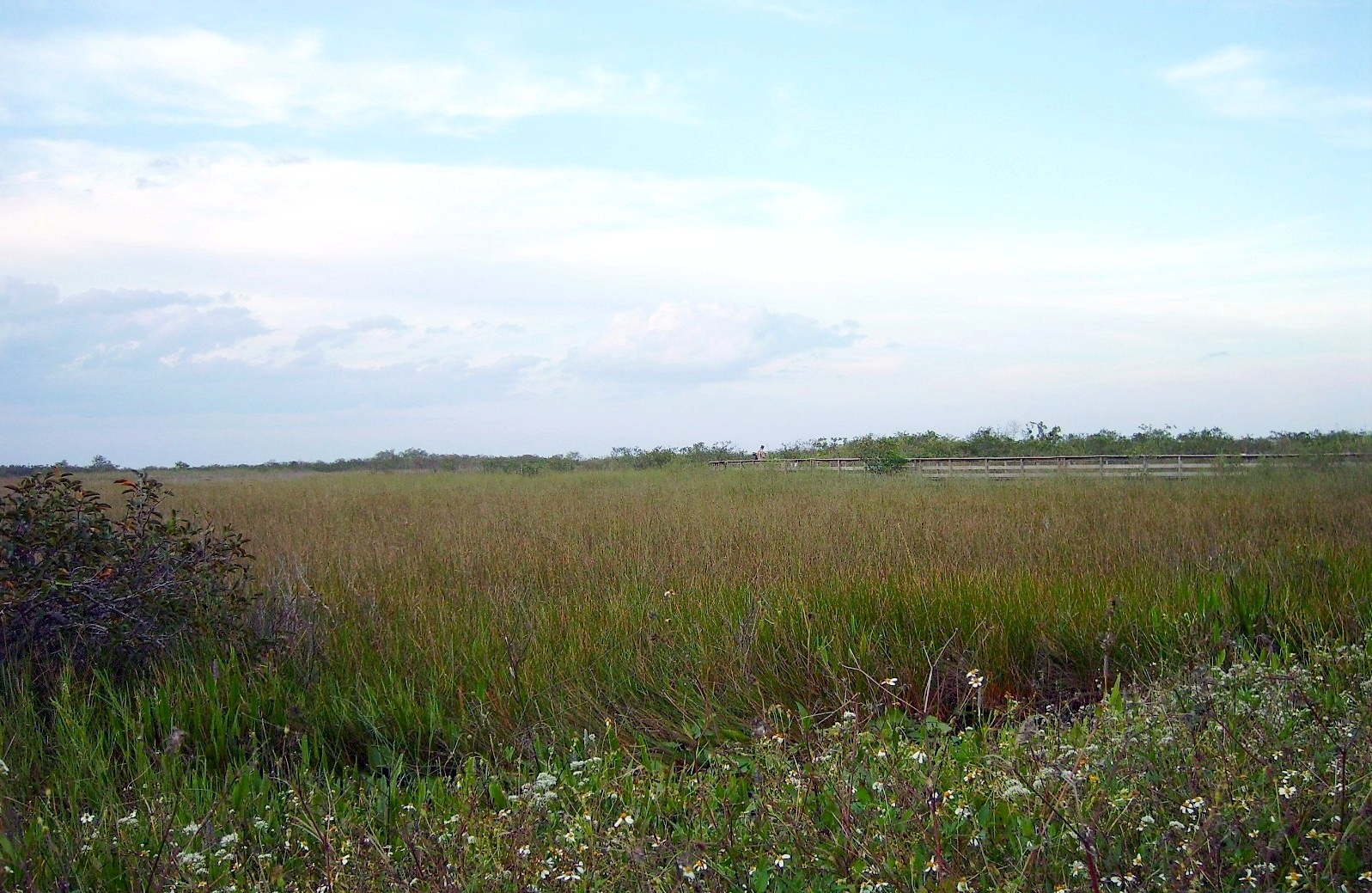
A view of Taylor Slough from the Anhinga Trail boardwalk.

Taylor Slough, located in the southeastern corner of the Florida Everglades, along with the much larger Shark River Slough further to the west, are the principal natural drainages for the freshwater Everglades and the essential conduit for providing overland freshwater to Florida Bay.

== Description ==
Taylor Slough is a 247 square kilometer wetland system. The slough stretches from the east everglades, to the northern portion of Florida Bay. In its natural form, Taylor Slough is the primary source of overland, freshwater flow into the north eastern part of Florida Bay. A major portion of the Taylor Slough resides in Everglades National Park. Taylor Slough crosses over part of the C-111 basin.

== History ==
The term slough (pronounced slew) is used to describe areas of the Everglades where there is slightly deeper water than in the surrounding marshes and where a slow, but measurable, current is present. In essence, sloughs are the broad, shallow rivers of the Everglades. Sloughs occupy areas of slight depressions in the limestone bedrock underlying south Florida and generally remain wet during the seasonal dry interval (November to May). Sloughs are important refuges for aquatic wildlife during these dry intervals.

== Dredging ==
The famous Anhinga Trail in the eastern section of Everglades National Park leads into a section of the Taylor Slough that was further deepened during the construction of the old Ingraham Highway from Florida City to Flamingo, Florida.

== Animals ==
Most animals can be found in Taylor Slough during the dry season.

== See also ==
- Cape Sable Seaside Sparrow
- Everglades
- Everglades National Park
- Marl prairie
- Shark River Slough
