= Marl prairie =

Type of wet prairies

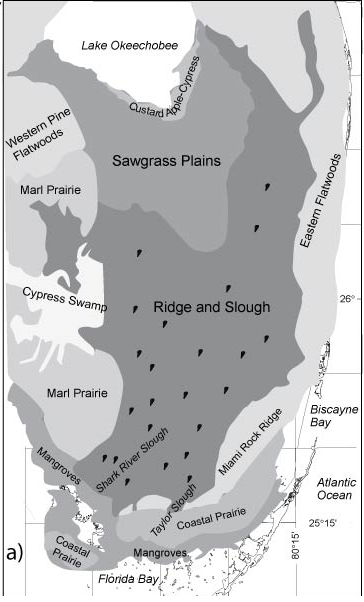
Marl Prairie locations in the Florida Everglades

Marl prairies are wet prairies that allow for a slow seepage of overland water and exist in the Everglades, usually bordering deeper sloughs, and contain low-growth vegetation.

== Description ==
Marl is loose earthy deposits mixed with clay and calcium carbonate and sits on limestone bedrock. Marl prairies are home to microbes, bacteria, and algae, and serve as an important food source to some fish, tadpoles, and invertebrates. Marl prairies are also thought to be the preferred breeding ground of the endangered Cape Sable Seaside Sparrow.

== See also ==
- Taylor Slough
- Shark River Slough
