= Anhinga Trail =

- U.S. National Register of Historic Places
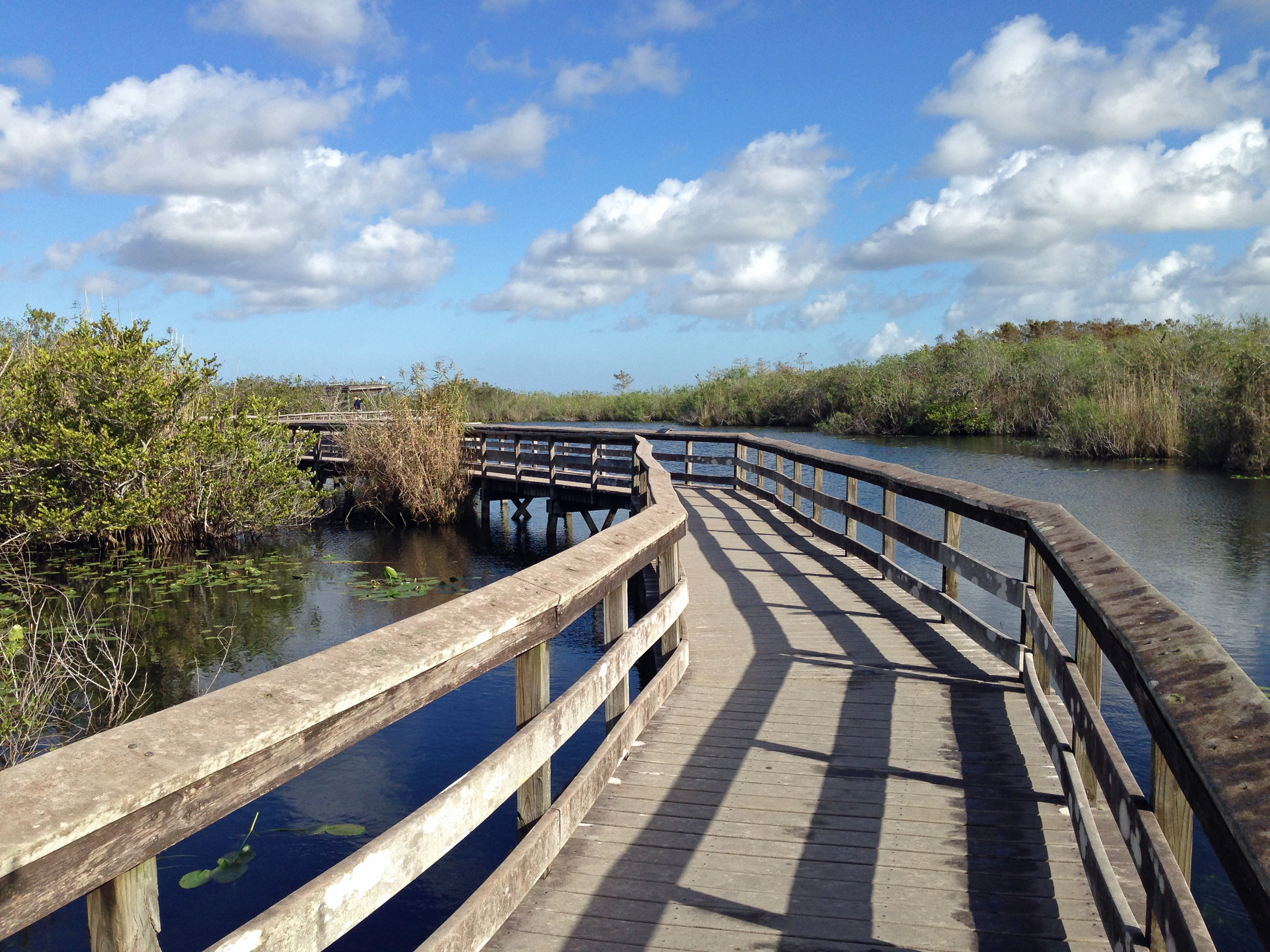
- Overlook from Anhinga Trail boardwalk looking north. Other part of trail boardwalk visible in background.

- Location within Florida Location within the United States
- Location: Everglades National Park
- Nearest city: Florida City, Florida
- Coordinates: 25°22′54″N 80°36′35″W
- MPS: Archeological Resources of Everglades National Park MPS
- NRHP reference No.: 96001178
- Added to NRHP: November 5, 1996

The Anhinga Trail is a short trail (about 0.4 miles) in the Everglades National Park. Located 4 miles from the park entrance, it starts at the Royal Palm Visitor Center. The trail is a paved walkway and a boardwalk over Taylor Slough, a freshwater sawgrass marsh. Abundant wildlife is visible from the trail, including alligators, turtles, anhingas, herons, and egrets. It is one of the most popular trails in the park. On November 5, 1996, it was added to the U.S. National Register of Historic Places.

In 2003, tourists witnessed a fight between an alligator and a Burmese python which went on for 24 hours, until a larger alligator joined the fight and the snake escaped. Video and news coverage of the fight was widespread and brought attention to the spread of the python, an invasive species, in the Everglades.

== Bibliography ==
- Bilger, Burkhard (April 20, 2009). "Swamp things: Florida's uninvited predators". The New Yorker. Vol. 85, no. 10. p. 80.
- Hammer, Roger L. (2005). A FalconGuide to Everglades National Park and the Surrounding Area 2005: a Guide to Exploring the Great Outdoors. Guilford, CT: Globe Pequot.

== Gallery ==
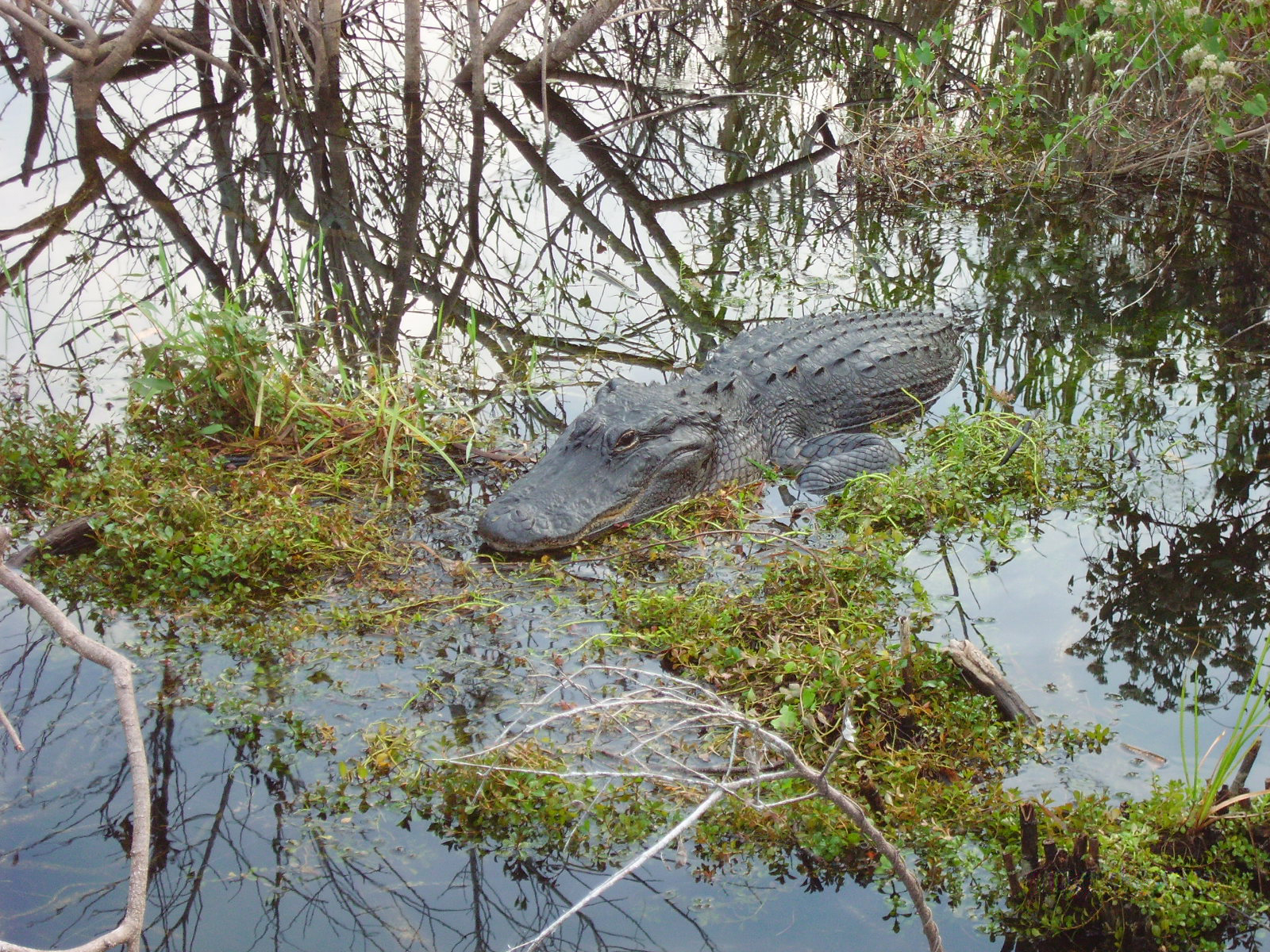
One of the many alligators visible from the Anhinga Trail boardwalk.

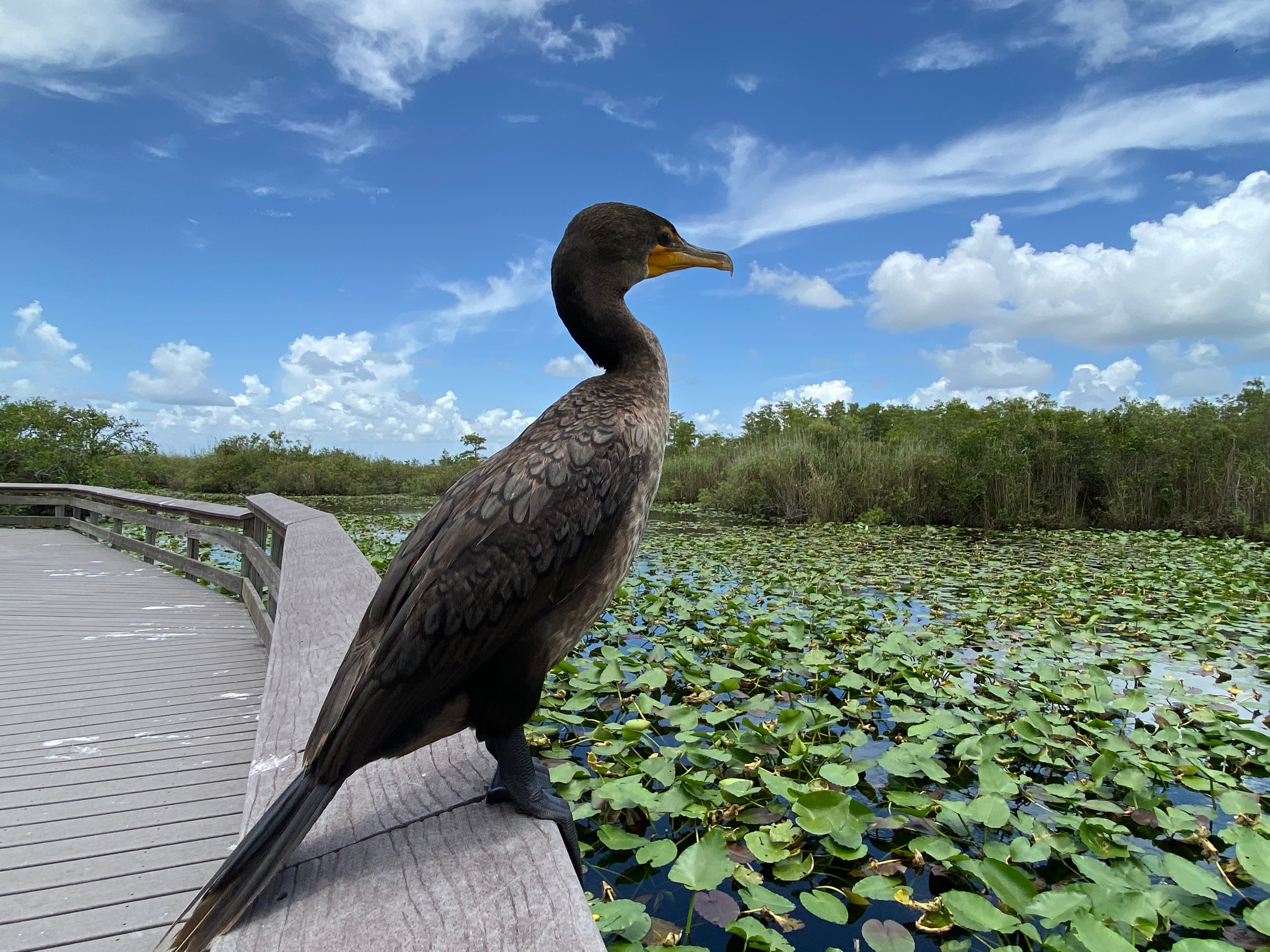
A double-crested cormorant on a railing
