= Water Conservation Area 3 =

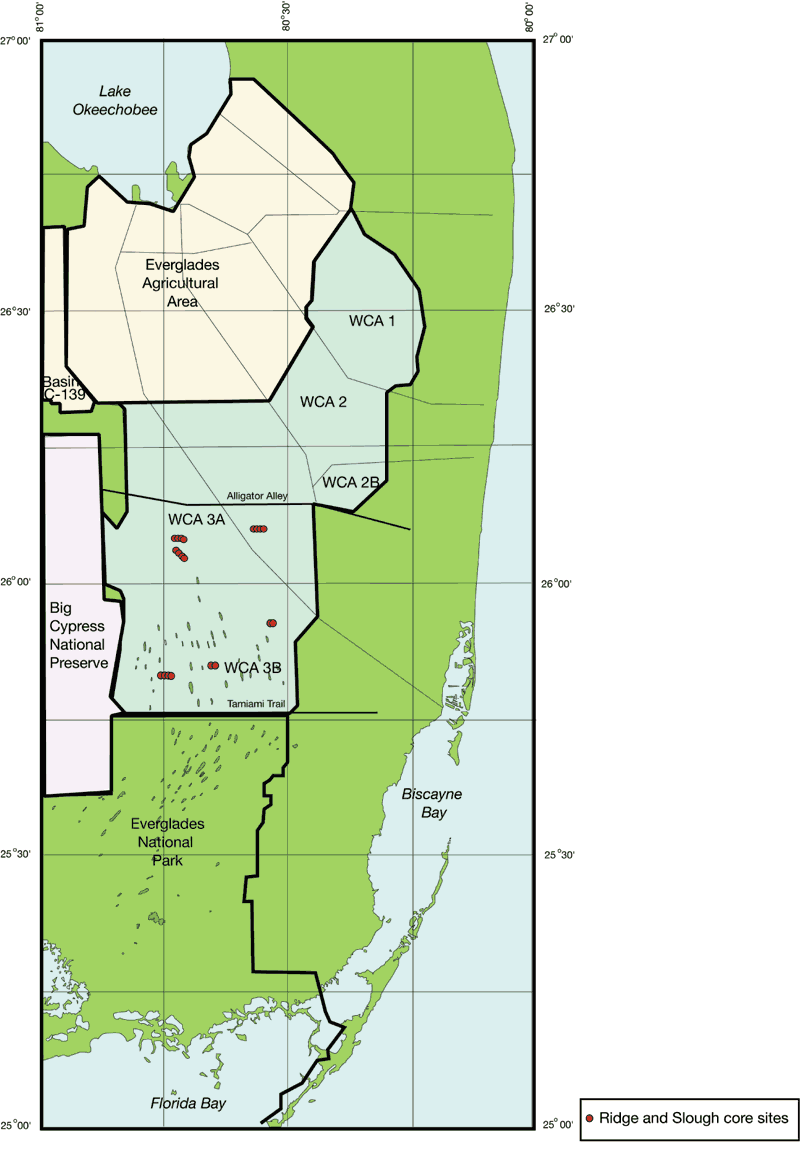
This map shows the United States Geological Survey's compartmentalized map of Water Conservation Areas 1, 2 and 3

Water Conservation Area 3 (WCA-3) is the largest existing WCA covering a total of 915 square miles within Western Dade and Broward Counties. Lying southwest of WCA-2 and just north of Everglades National Park, WCA-3 is used primarily as an area to receive flood waters from adjacent areas and store them for beneficial municipal, urban, and agricultural uses. It was subdivided into WCA-3A and WCA-3B by way of the L-67 canal and levees as a safeguard against seepage into the aquifer.

== WCA-3A ==
WCA-3A makes up 786 square miles of the whole area and is responsible for delivering water to both Everglades National Park and Miami-Dade County. It is the only WCA that is not fully enclosed by levees. A gap left in the mid western side allows for overland flow into Big Cypress National Preserve.It is also the home of multiple recreational and hunting lodges or camps.

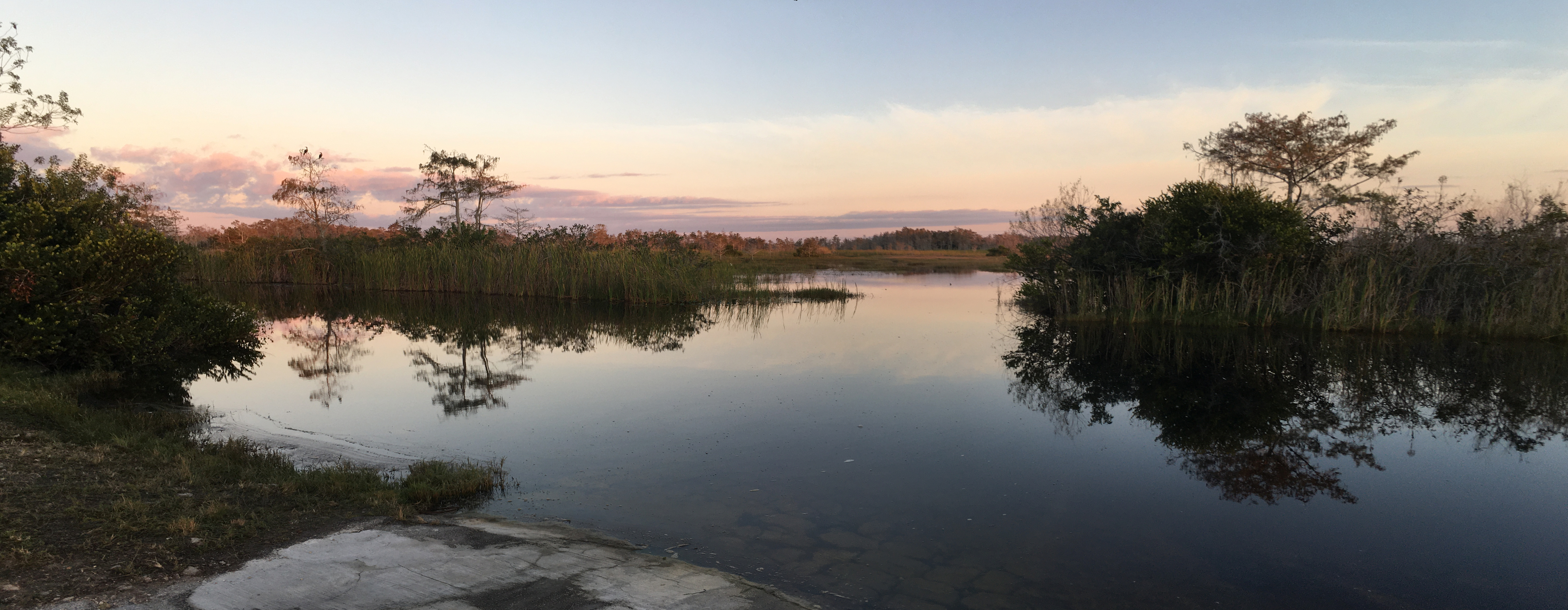
WCA-3A

== WCA-3B ==
WCA-3B is the remaining 128 square miles located in the southeast corner of WCA-3. Its primary function is listed as recharging and maintaining groundwater levels in coastal areas to the east. Florida Department of Environmental Protection currently rates the water quality found there as POOR due to the introduction of nutrient-rich water from the northern end. The overwhelming presence of phosphorus in this water has resulted in the degradation of native sawgrass by invasive cattails. Once present, cattails prove to be quick to spread and difficult to eradicate.

On May 11,1996, ValuJet Flight 592 crashed into WCA-3B, killing everyone on board.

== See also ==
- Everglades
- Everglades National Park
- Water Conservation Area 1
