= Loxahatchee National Wildlife Refuge =

United States National Wildlife Refuge in Florida

Arthur R. Marshall Loxahatchee National Wildlife Refuge
- IUCN category IV (habitat/species management area)
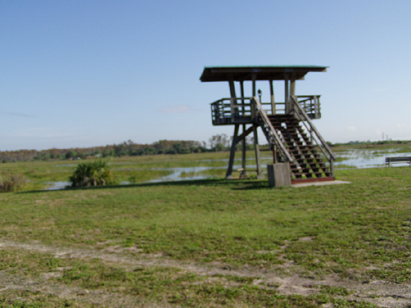
- Observation Platform overlooking the C-7 compartment on the Marsh Trail

- Location within Florida
- Location: Palm Beach County, Florida, United States
- Nearest city: Boynton Beach, Florida
- Coordinates: 26°30′30″N 80°20′00″W
- Area: 145,188 acres (587.55 km^{2})
- Established: 1951
- Governing body: U.S. Fish and Wildlife Service
- Website: Arthur R. Marshall Loxahatchee National Wildlife Refuge

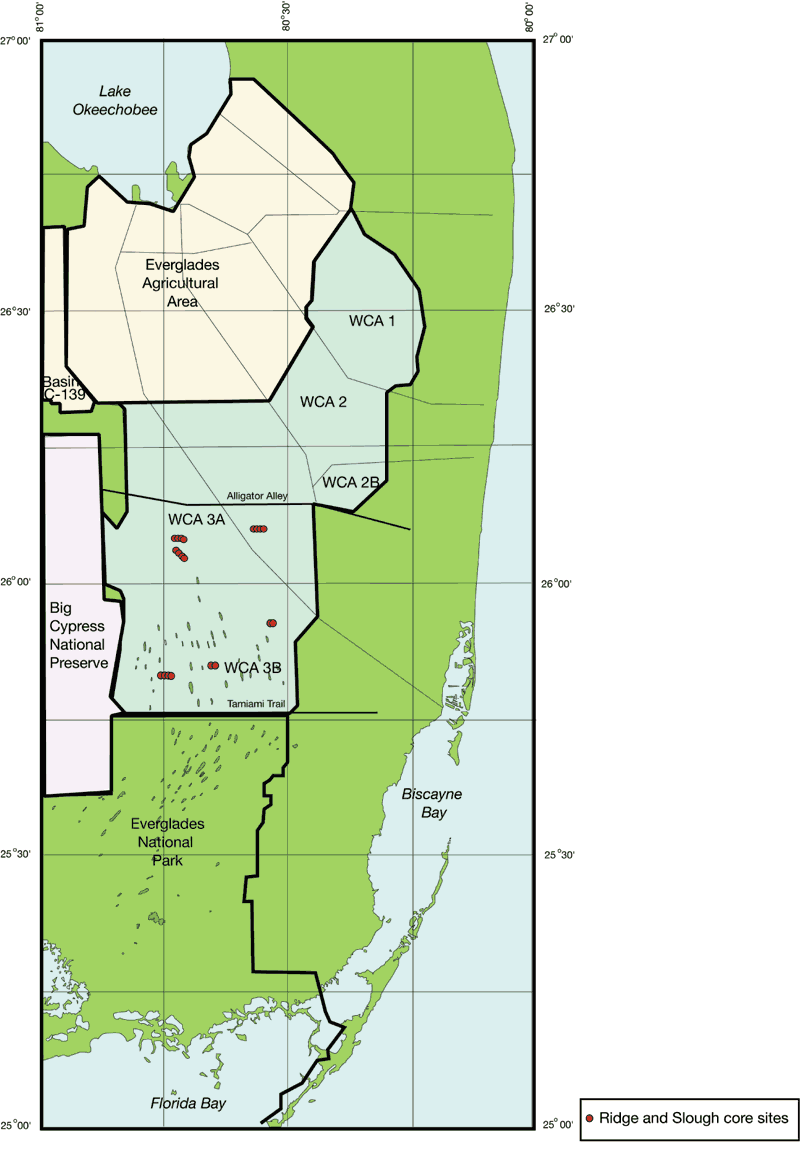
This map shows the United States Geological Survey's compartmentalized map of Water Conservation Areas 1, 2 and 3

The Arthur R. Marshall Loxahatchee National Wildlife Refuge is a 145,188-acre (587.55 km^{2}) wildlife sanctuary located west of Boynton Beach, in Palm Beach County, Florida. It is also known as Water Conservation Area 1 (WCA-1). It includes the most northern remnant of the historic Everglades wetland ecosystem.

Bordering the Everglades Agricultural Area (EAA) to the west and the urban communities of Palm Beach County to the east, the conservation area contains nearly 145,000 acres of Everglades wetland habitat. Owned by the state, WCA-1 is currently managed by the U.S. Fish and Wildlife Service and provides an area specified for recreation, wildlife population maintenance and habitat management and restoration.

== Overview ==
The Arthur R. Marshall Loxahatchee National Wildlife Refuge is located seven miles west of the city of Boynton Beach in Palm Beach County, Florida. The refuge was established in 1951 under the authority of the Migratory Bird Conservation Act and is managed through a license agreement between the South Florida Water Management District and the U.S. Fish and Wildlife Service. In total, the refuge includes nearly 145,000 acres of northern Everglades habitat. The refuge contains one of three water conservation areas (WCAs) in south Florida and is maintained to provide water storage and flood control, as well as habitat for native fish and wildlife populations. Water is regulated by a series of pumps, canals, water control structures, and levees built by the Army Corps of Engineers. These freshwater storage areas and part of the Everglades National Park are all that remain of the original Everglades.

== Climate ==
According to the Köppen Climate Classification system, the area has a monsoon climate, abbreviated "Am" on climate maps. The hottest temperature recorded in the refuge was 103 °F (39.4 °C) on July 27, 1962, while the coldest temperature recorded was 24 °F (−4.4 °C) on January 20, 1977 and January 12, 1982.

Climate data for Loxahatchee National Wildlife Refuge, Florida, 1991–2020 normals, extremes 1940–present
Month	Jan	Feb	Mar	Apr	May	Jun	Jul	Aug	Sep	Oct	Nov	Dec	Year
Record high °F (°C)	90 (32)	91 (33)	96 (36)	98 (37)	98 (37)	100 (38)	103 (39)	99 (37)	98 (37)	95 (35)	92 (33)	95 (35)	103 (39)
Mean maximum °F (°C)	83.6 (28.7)	85.0 (29.4)	87.3 (30.7)	89.1 (31.7)	91.3 (32.9)	93.1 (33.9)	93.8 (34.3)	93.9 (34.4)	92.6 (33.7)	90.2 (32.3)	86.5 (30.3)	84.9 (29.4)	94.9 (34.9)
Mean daily maximum °F (°C)	74.7 (23.7)	76.9 (24.9)	79.3 (26.3)	82.5 (28.1)	85.5 (29.7)	88.4 (31.3)	89.8 (32.1)	90.1 (32.3)	88.6 (31.4)	85.5 (29.7)	80.2 (26.8)	77.4 (25.2)	83.2 (28.5)
Daily mean °F (°C)	65.1 (18.4)	67.3 (19.6)	70.1 (21.2)	73.3 (22.9)	76.8 (24.9)	80.5 (26.9)	81.9 (27.7)	82.3 (27.9)	81.2 (27.3)	77.9 (25.5)	72.1 (22.3)	68.5 (20.3)	74.8 (23.7)
Mean daily minimum °F (°C)	55.5 (13.1)	57.7 (14.3)	60.8 (16.0)	64.2 (17.9)	68.1 (20.1)	72.5 (22.5)	74.1 (23.4)	74.4 (23.6)	73.7 (23.2)	70.3 (21.3)	63.9 (17.7)	59.7 (15.4)	66.2 (19.0)
Mean minimum °F (°C)	40.6 (4.8)	43.7 (6.5)	46.8 (8.2)	52.5 (11.4)	60.5 (15.8)	68.2 (20.1)	69.7 (20.9)	71.0 (21.7)	69.7 (20.9)	60.6 (15.9)	50.5 (10.3)	45.7 (7.6)	38.1 (3.4)
Record low °F (°C)	24 (−4)	27 (−3)	27 (−3)	35 (2)	47 (8)	56 (13)	62 (17)	62 (17)	60 (16)	42 (6)	33 (1)	26 (−3)	24 (−4)
Average precipitation inches (mm)	3.34 (85)	2.81 (71)	3.03 (77)	3.07 (78)	4.97 (126)	9.73 (247)	6.69 (170)	8.28 (210)	8.60 (218)	6.36 (162)	3.69 (94)	3.06 (78)	63.63 (1,616)
Average precipitation days (≥ 0.01 in)	9.9	8.0	8.1	7.7	10.7	17.7	17.8	19.3	17.4	13.5	9.1	9.9	149.1
Source 1: NOAA
Source 2: National Weather Service

== Controversy ==
In 2016, the South Florida Water Management District announced that it was providing notice to the U.S. Fish and Wildlife Service that it would cancel the lease of the property to the federal government for failure to control invasive species. SFWMD is believed to have created the invasive species problem in the first place. It is believed that this approach is being taken to allow for polluted water in excess of 10 ppb phosphorus to be stored on the land.

== Management activities ==
According to the U.S. Fish and Wildlife Service, the refuge's management activities focus primarily on wetland habitat restoration, particularly through water quality and hydropattern improvement, and exotic plant control. A large portion of refuge management effort is spent controlling exotic and invasive plants and pursuing funding to eliminate these threats. The three most problematic exotic plant species on the refuge are melaleuca, Brazilian pepper, and Old World climbing fern (lygodium). The refuge is working together with many other federal agencies and state agencies regionally in South Florida to address these issues and restore Everglades habitat for the benefit of wildlife.

== Features ==
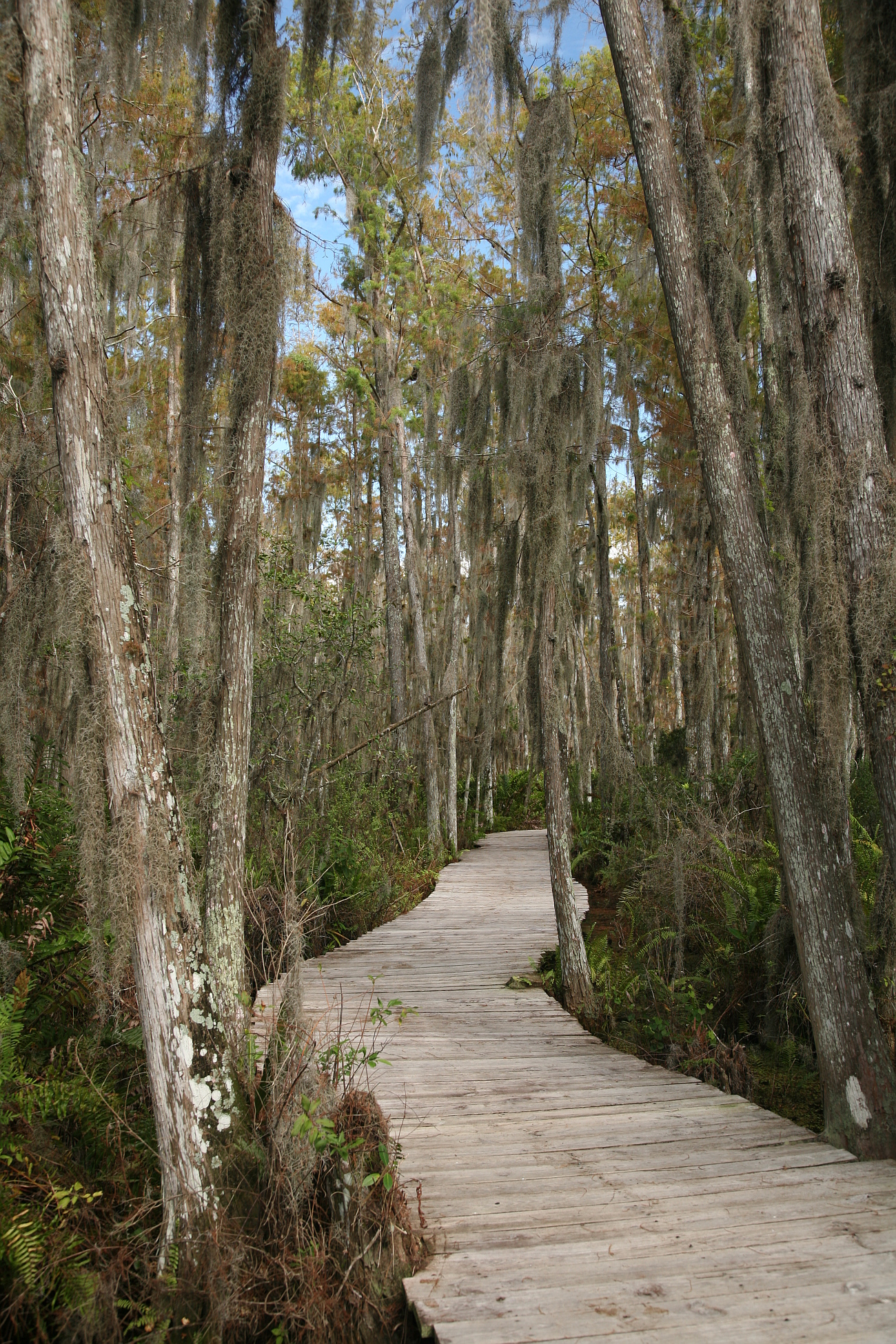
Boardwalk through the Loxahatchee swamp.

Loxahatchee NWR is one of over 500 national wildlife refuges located throughout the United States and administered by the United States Fish and Wildlife Service. The refuge not only preserves and protects native wildlife, but also offers compatible public recreational and educational opportunities including walking trails, a canoe trail, bike trail, boat ramps, fishing platform, observation towers, butterfly garden, and a visitor center. It is home to American alligator, the endangered snail kite, coastal plain cooter and Florida softshell turtles, and as many as 257 species of birds. As such, it has been designated a 'gateway site' for the Great Florida Birding Trail.

Not quite all of the 145,188-acre (587.55 km^{2}) refuge is Everglades marsh habitat. A 400-acre (1.6 km^{2}) bald cypress swamp is the largest remaining remnant of a cypress strand that once separated the pine flatwoods in the east from the Everglades marshes. A boardwalk into the swamp gives the visitor a chance for an up-close swamp experience without getting their feet wet. Hurricane Wilma damaged the refuge in October 2005, and the administration building was condemned. The Lee Road fishing pier was damaged by Hurricane Irma and will remain closed until further notice.

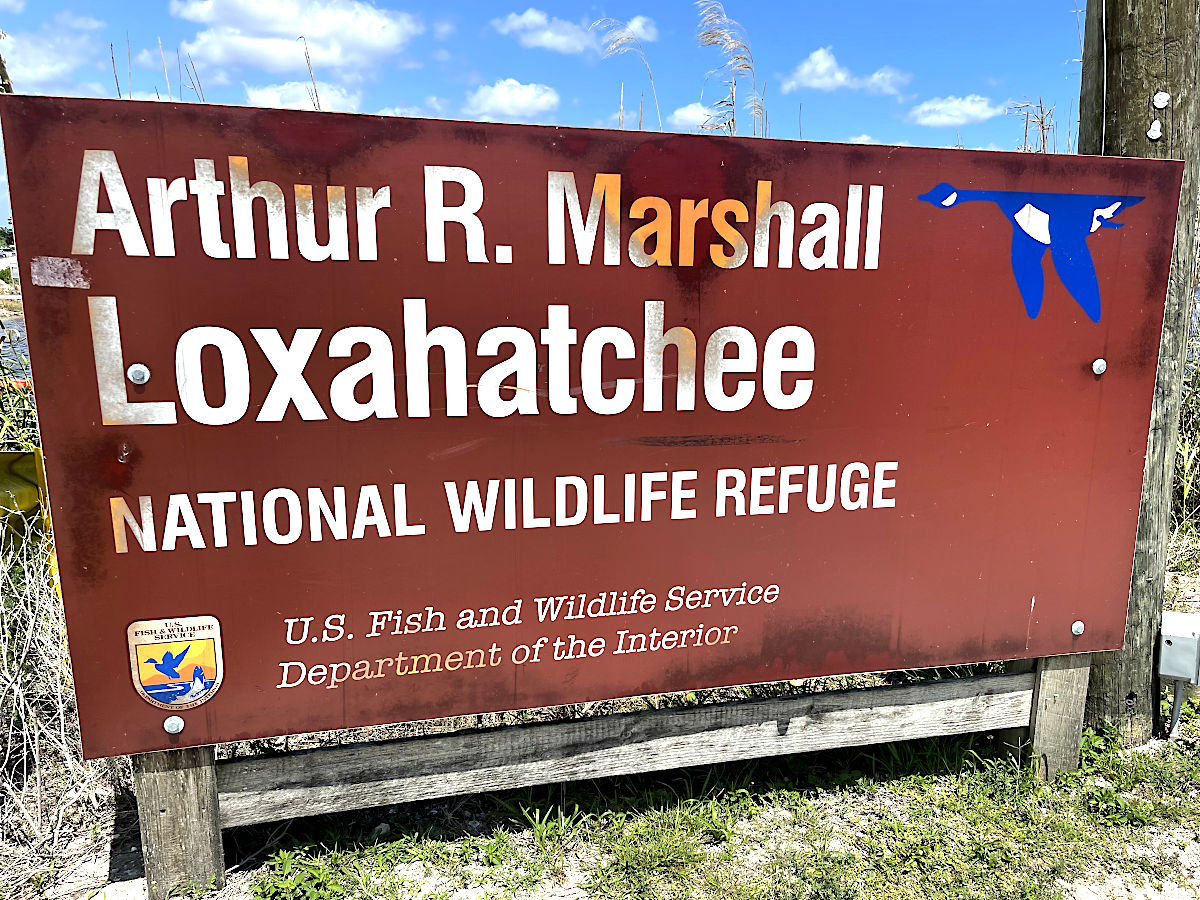
Sign at Hillsboro Area trailhead

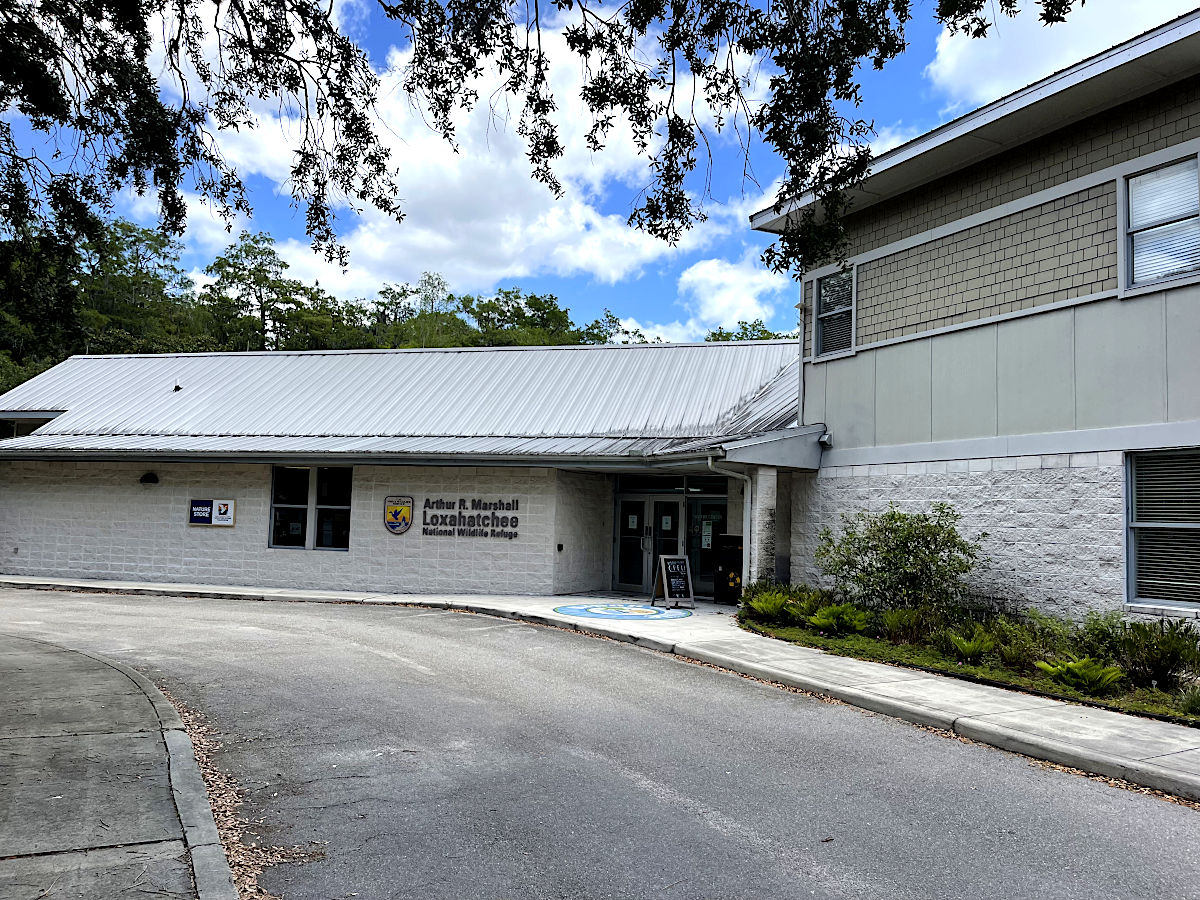
Visitor Center at Boynton Beach

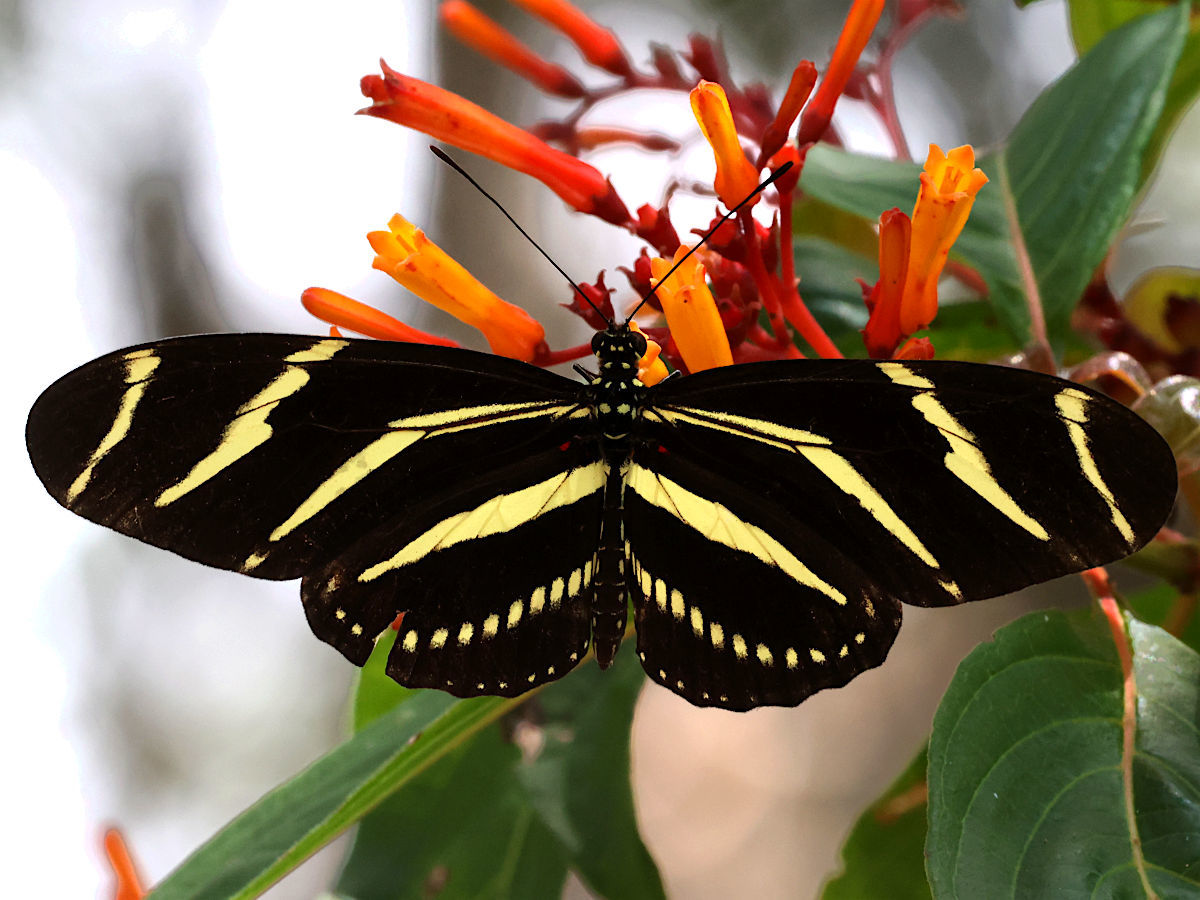
Zebra Longwing at the butterfly garden

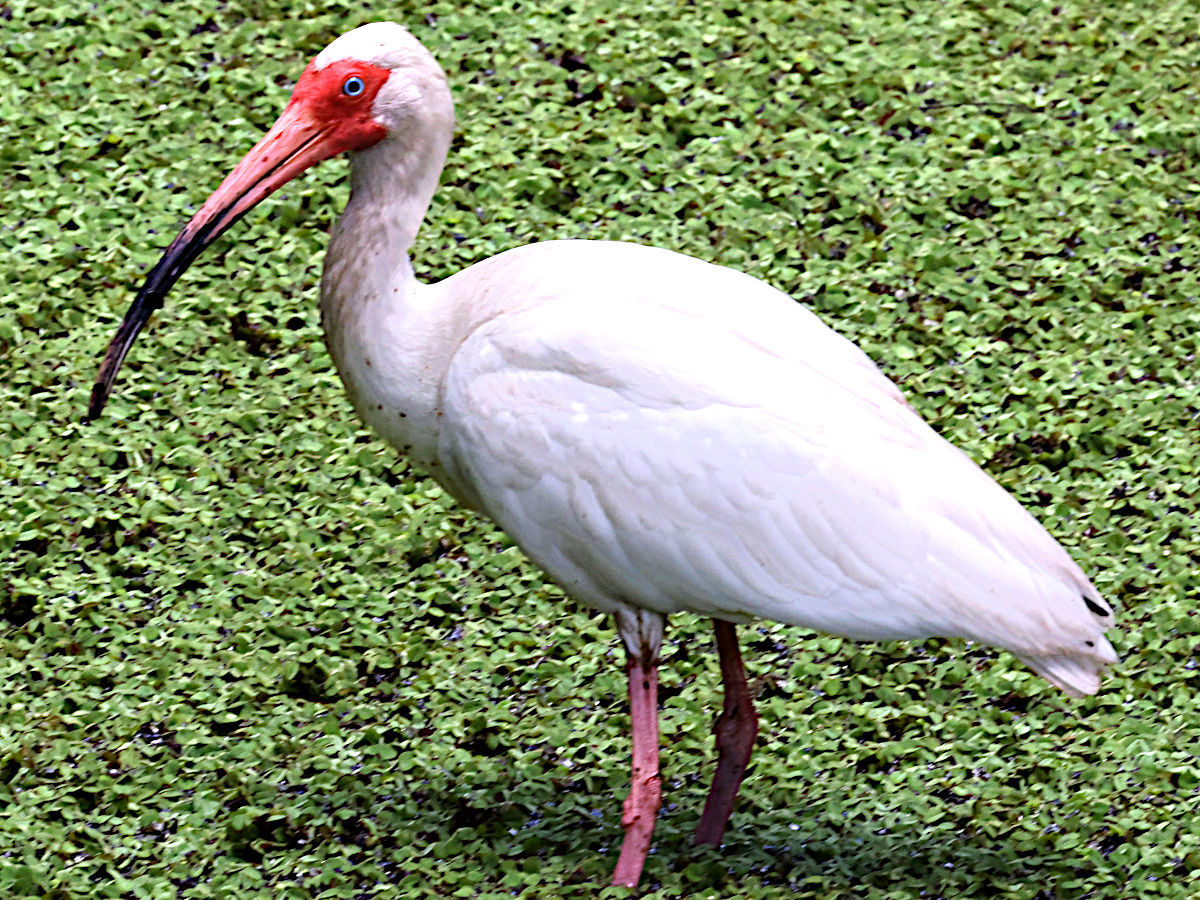
American white ibis by the boardwalk

Conservation

Despite all of its treasures, the refuge is in serious danger of quickly becoming an exclusive haven for invasive plants, especially the broad-leaved paper bark (Melaleuca quinquenervia) and Old World climbing fern (Lygodium microphyllum), both rapidly growing non-native species, which are quickly overgrowing the native flora and are likely not compatible with the native wildlife.

== Park Activities ==
The refuge allows multiple activities in the park such as, fishing, hunting, hiking and also offers guided tours. Fishing is allowed in only three areas of the refuge which are Hillsboro, Headquarters and the 20-mile bend. All fishermen must also carry a valid fishing license in the state of Florida. There are also over 16 different species of fish present within the refuge that are able to be caught. Hunting is allowed within the refuge to manage wildlife populations. It is one of 330 refuges open to the population for hunting. Waterfowl hunting is permitted in the late fall and early winter months. All hunters are required to possess a valid Florida State Hunting License and a Florida State Duck Stamp. Alligator hunting is only available by permit from the state of Florida. There are also numerous hiking trails throughout the refuge. One is a bald cypress swamp boardwalk that is located directly behind the visitor center. The others are accessible through the Lee Road parking lot. The refuge also offers guided tours throughout the year. They offer, canoe tours, night walks and tram tours by reservation only.

== See also ==
- Everglades
- Everglades National Park

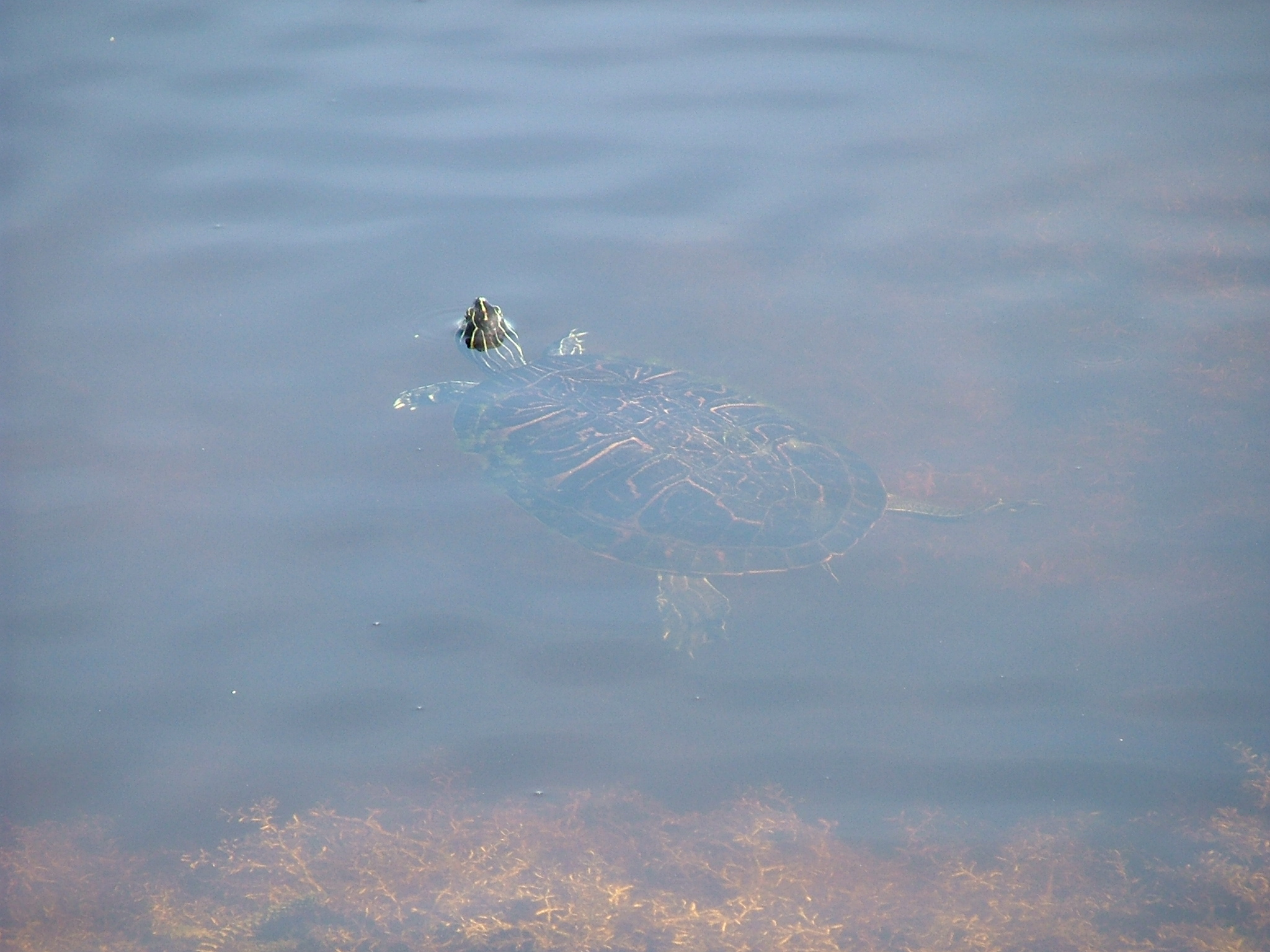
Turtle

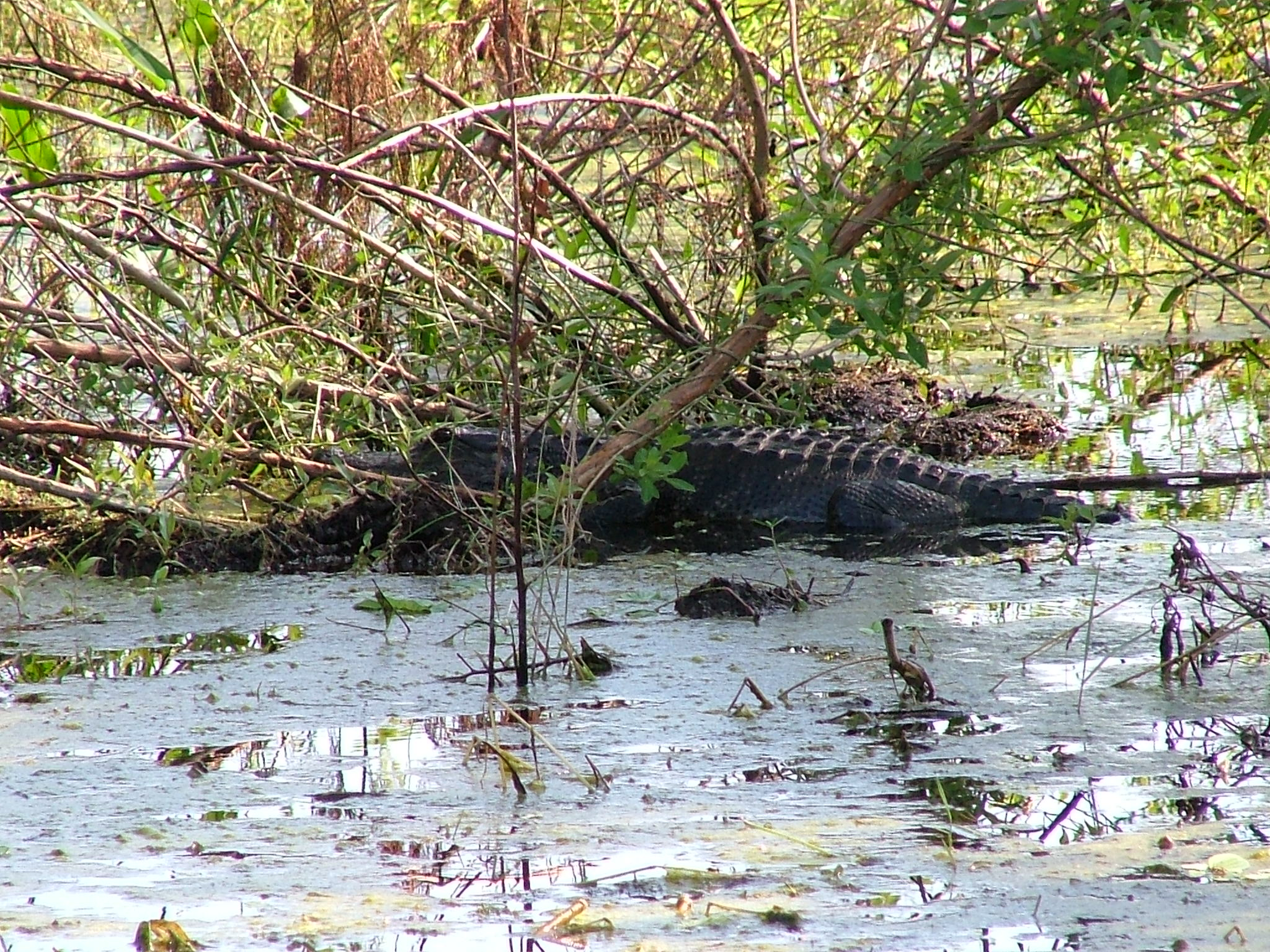
Alligator warming in the sun

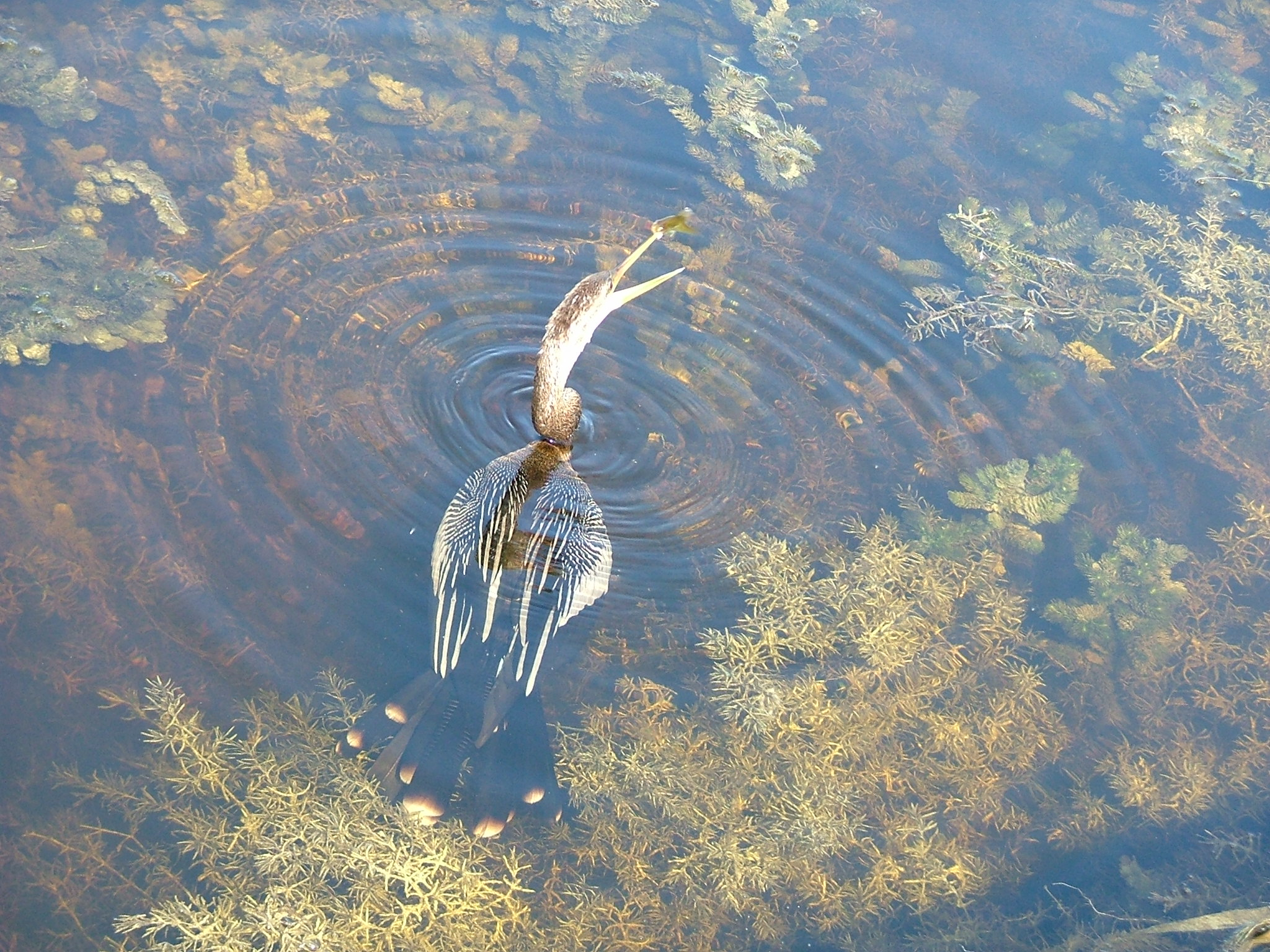
Anhinga fishing
