= Stormwater treatment area =

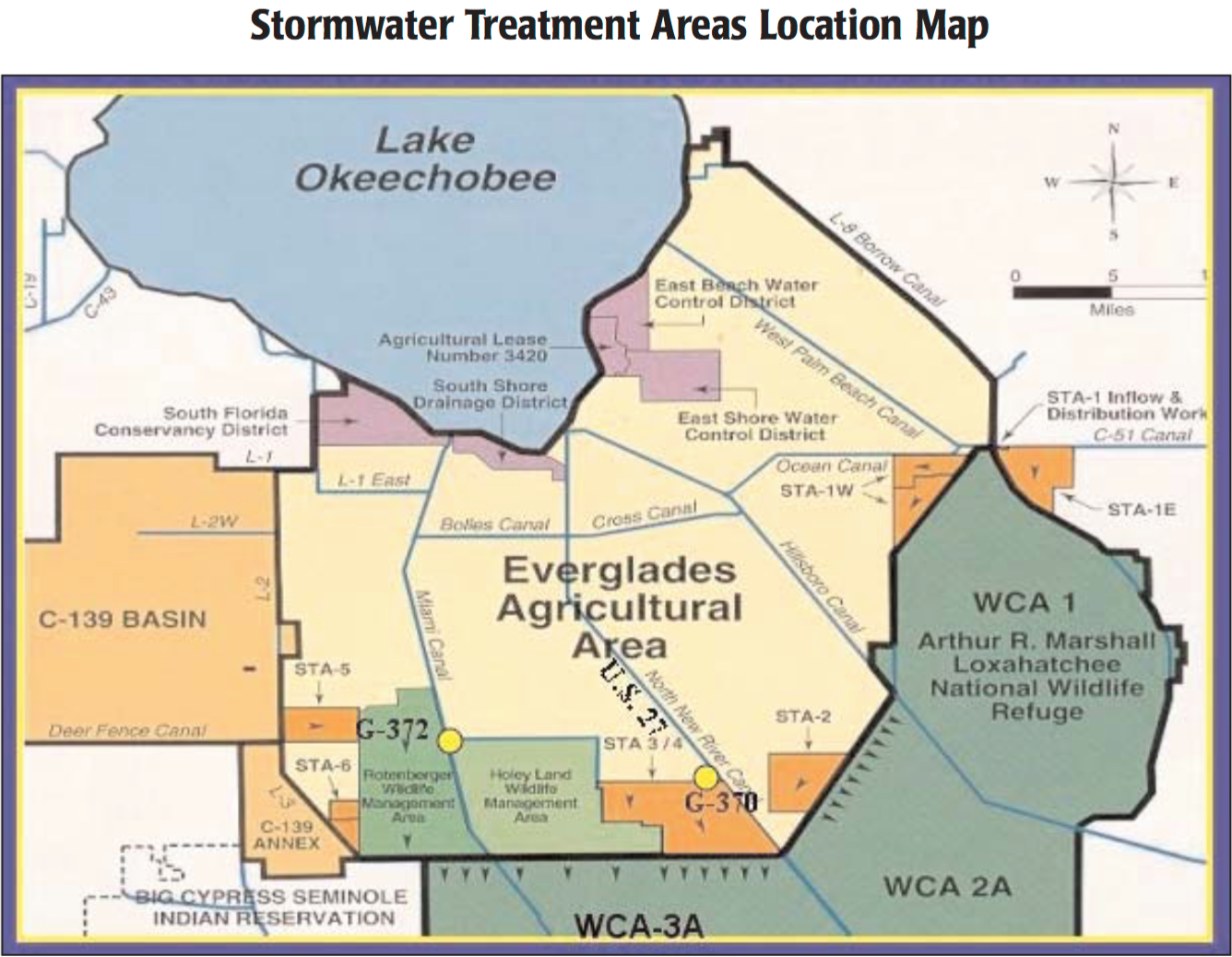
Stormwater Treatment Areas Location Map This map shows the locations of six Stormwater Treatment Areas

Stormwater treatment areas (STAs) are constructed wetlands divided into flow-through treatment cells that remove nutrients from agricultural and urban runoff water. The nutrients are consumed through plant growth, and captured by accumulation of dead plant material in a layer of sediment. STAs were introduced around the Everglades National Park in an effort to reduce nutrient levels in water flowing towards the park. STAs have been estimated to reduce phosphorus levels by about 80%.

== Description ==
Agricultural and urban runoff water containing excess phosphorus is channeled through pump stations into shallow marshes that have been planted with a selection of plants with useful characteristics for water purification, like cattails, submerged aquatic plants and algae. These plants species absorb phosphorus, storing it in their roots, stems and leaves. When they die, they decompose creating a sediment layer that continues to absorb and hold decades worth of phosphorus. Water that flows out of the STAs into Everglades National Park has significantly lower levels of phosphorus than it did when it first entered.

== History of phosphorus in Everglades National Park ==
The Everglades is a delicate ecological system with a naturally low level of existing phosphorus, resulting in a landscape of sawgrass, wet prairies and tree islands that were well adapted to the low nutrient environment. Increasing levels of nutrients such as phosphorus can encourage the growth of invasive species, smothering and crowding out the natives. STAs have been implemented in key positions at the northern edge of the Everglades to help keep phosphorus laden water from reaching the park, but concerns remain that the already elevated phosphorus levels in both Lake Okeechobee and the Everglades Agricultural Area (both heavy contributors to nutrient laden runoff) are so high that phosphorus loads into the park could continue for many decades.
