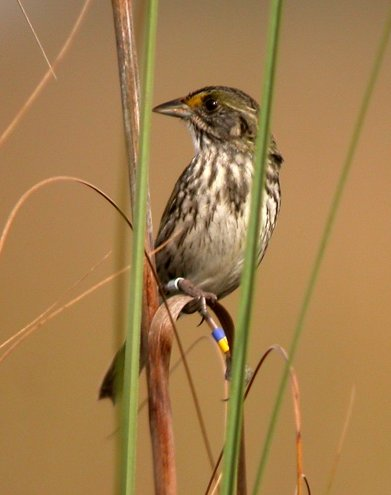
- In Everglades National Park

Conservation status
- Critically Imperiled (NatureServe)

- Endangered (ESA)

Scientific classification
- Kingdom: Animalia
- Phylum: Chordata
- Class: Aves
- Order: Passeriformes
- Family: Passerellidae
- Genus: Ammospiza
- Species: A. maritima
- Subspecies: A. m. mirabilis

Trinomial name
- Ammospiza maritima mirabilis (Howell, 1919)
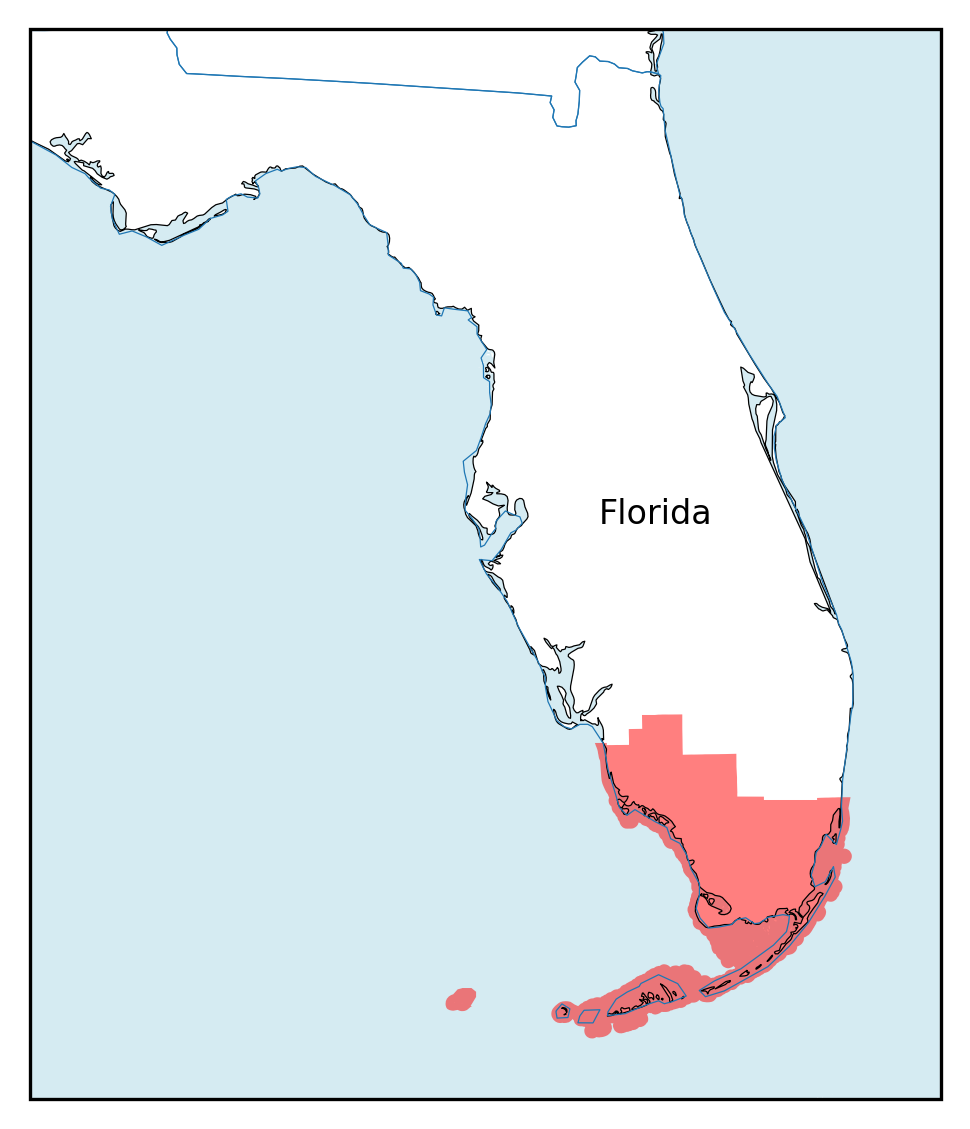

Synonyms
- Ammodramus maritimus mirabilis (A. H. Howell, 1919); Thryospiza mirabilis A. H. Howell, 1919

= Cape Sable seaside sparrow =

Subspecies of bird

The Cape Sable seaside sparrow (Ammospiza maritima mirabilis) is a subspecies of the seaside sparrow, a species of bird in the family Passerellidae native to the United States. This subspecies is endemic to southern Florida. It is designated endangered under the Endangered Species Act.

== Description ==
The Cape Sable seaside sparrow is 13 to 14 centimeters (5.1 to 5.5 in) in length. The back is dark olive-gray and the tail and wings are olive-brown. Adults are light gray on the belly to almost white with dark olive-gray streaks on the breast and sides.

== Biology ==
This subspecies occurs in prairie habitat, breeding in mixed marl prairie dominated by gulf hairawn muhly (Muhlenbergia sericea). The sparrow makes cup-shaped nests attached to vegetation a few inches above the ground. A female may produce two clutches per season, and a third if conditions are favorable.

Males are very territorial, claiming a patch of prime breeding habitat and defending it. Most vocalizations are produced by the males, which perch and call loudly to defend territory and advertise to females.

Courtship behavior includes males chasing females and offering them food and nesting materials. Females may initiate the process by approaching males and begging. Male and female raise their clutch of young together, and may remain together for the next clutch.

This subspecies is omnivorous, gleaning plant and animal items from the ground, including seeds, insects, and marine invertebrates.

== Ecology ==
The Cape Sable seaside sparrow lives on the prairies of the Everglades. The largest populations are in Big Cypress National Preserve and Taylor Slough in Everglades National Park. The bird's common name refers to Cape Sable, the southernmost point of mainland Florida and part of the Everglades.

This bird requires aquatic prairie with low water levels and open areas. Sea level rise, alterations in water flow caused by water management practices in South Florida, and natural processes such as hurricanes, have caused water level changes and flooding, reducing available habitat. Fire suppression has increased the plant density and diversity in the area, reducing the open habitat required by the sparrow. These factors contributed to its decline.

The bird is strongly influenced by water levels. Water level rise effectively halts breeding activities, in part because nests are suspended just off the ground. Daily water level shifts even affect behavior, subduing vocalizations by territorial males.

The bird's sensitivity to environmental conditions have earned it the nickname "Goldilocks bird", because for it to succeed, conditions must be "just right".

== Conservation ==
Water levels are tightly managed in many wetland regions in South Florida, with flood gates controlling water flow in parts of the Everglades. The flood gates were opened after heavy rains in the winter of 2016, inundating areas where water levels have been relatively low for decades. Sparrows in these areas immediately lost breeding habitat. Water management officials continue to balance species conservation with the adverse effects of flooding in this region.

In August 2013, Duke University scientist Stuart Pimm and the Center for Biological Diversity announced filing of a lawsuit against the U.S. Army Corps of Engineers and U.S. Fish and Wildlife Service. At issue was the continuing release of water flooding the Cape Sable seaside sparrow's habitat. The lawsuit alleged the practice to be in violation of the Endangered Species Act.

In 2016, the two agencies involved announced plans for further conservation activities to support the sparrow. These include stewarding areas that contain the best potential breeding habitat, and identifying areas that may serve as potential breeding sites as sea levels rise.

The bird illustrates the umbrella species concept of conservation biology, in that thorough protection of this taxon would require protection of a particular habitat and ecosystem, which would result in benefits for a great many other species.

== Gallery ==
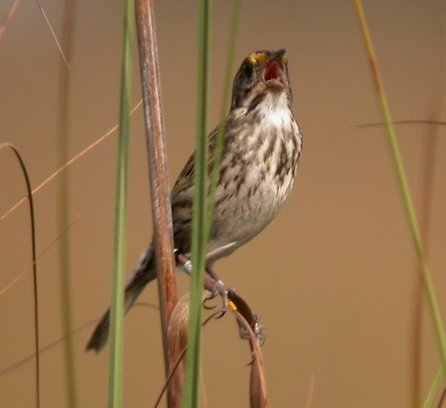
In the Everglades

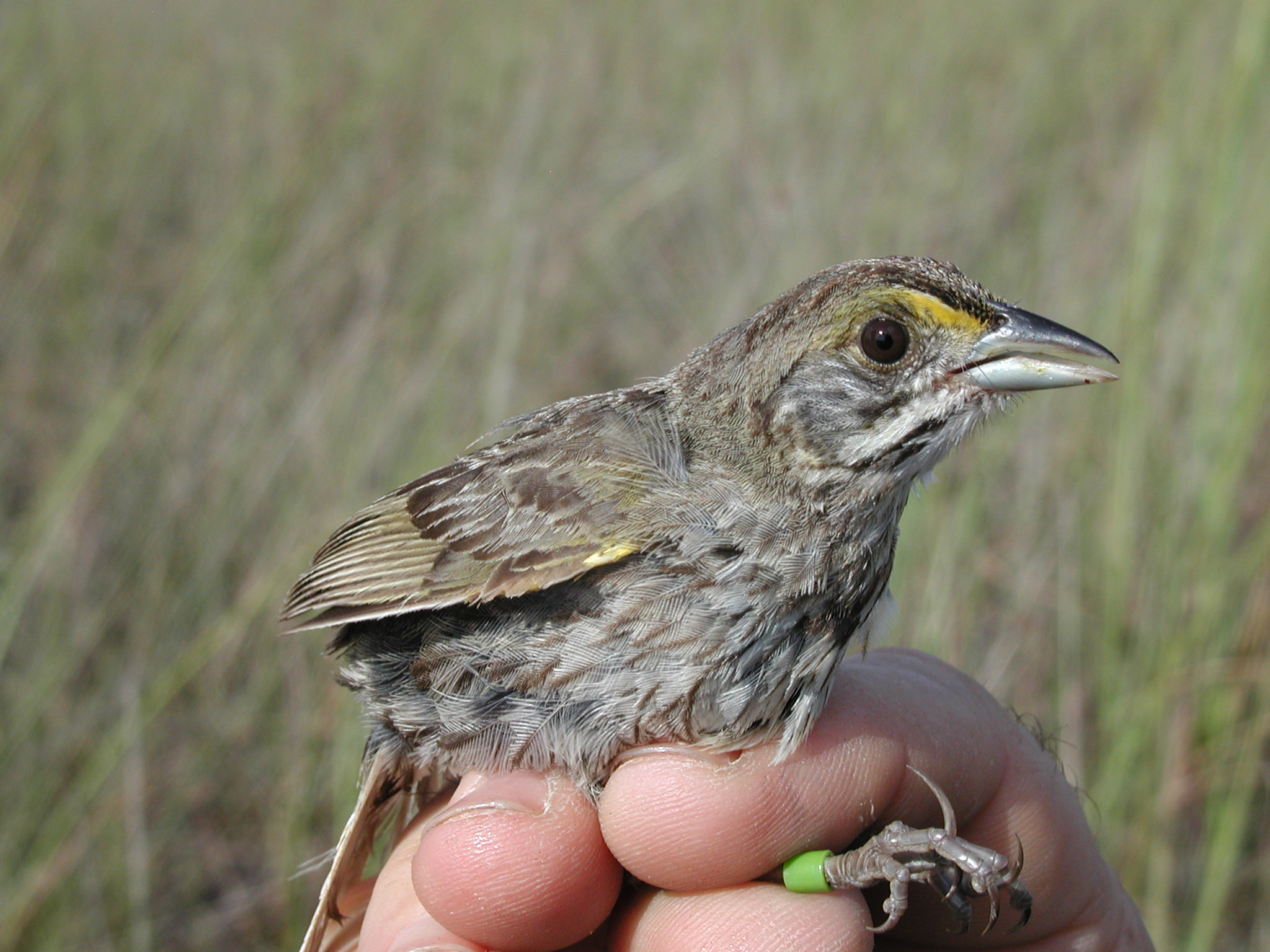
Individual in hand

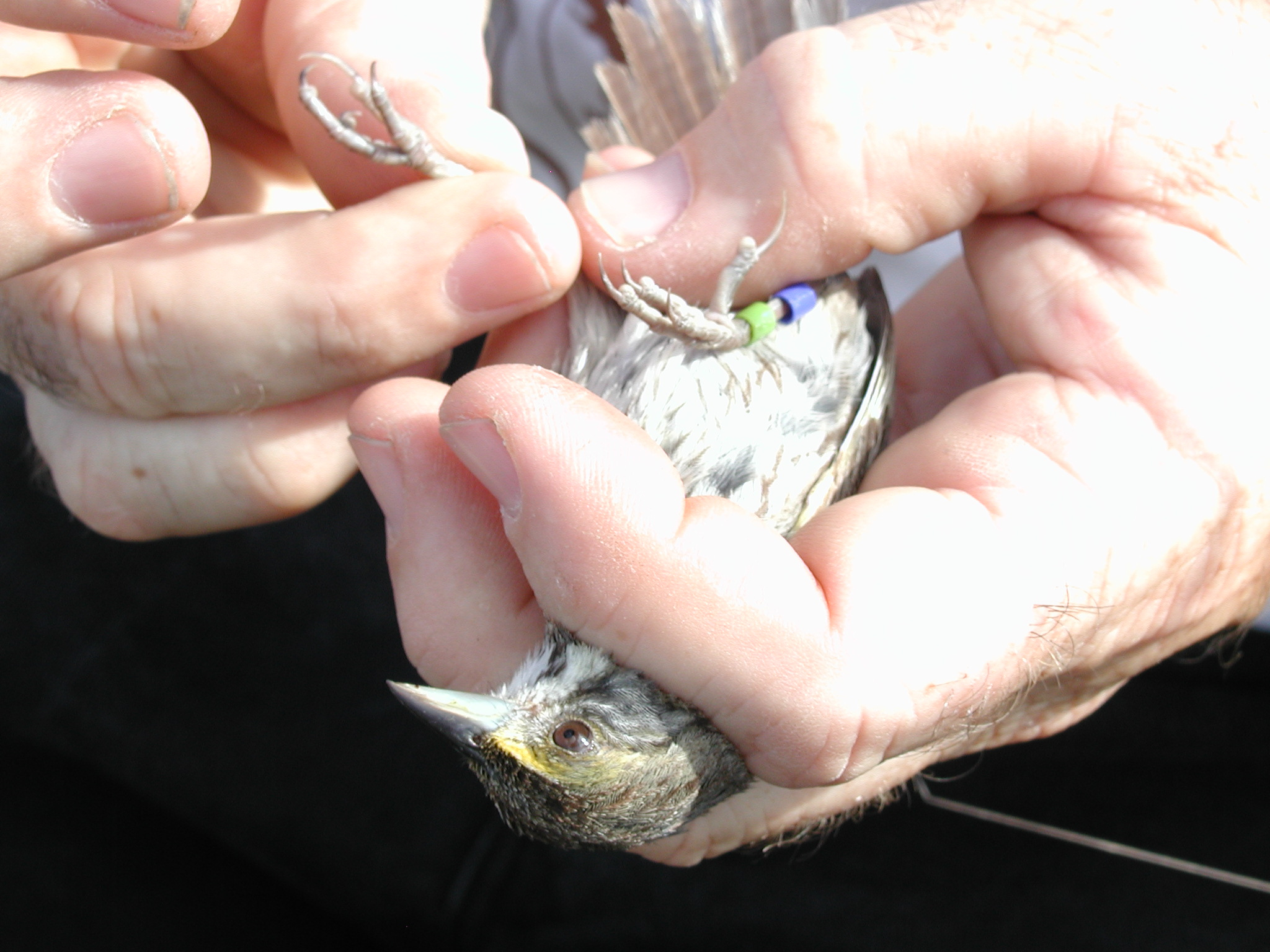
Individual being banded
