= Everglades Agricultural Area =

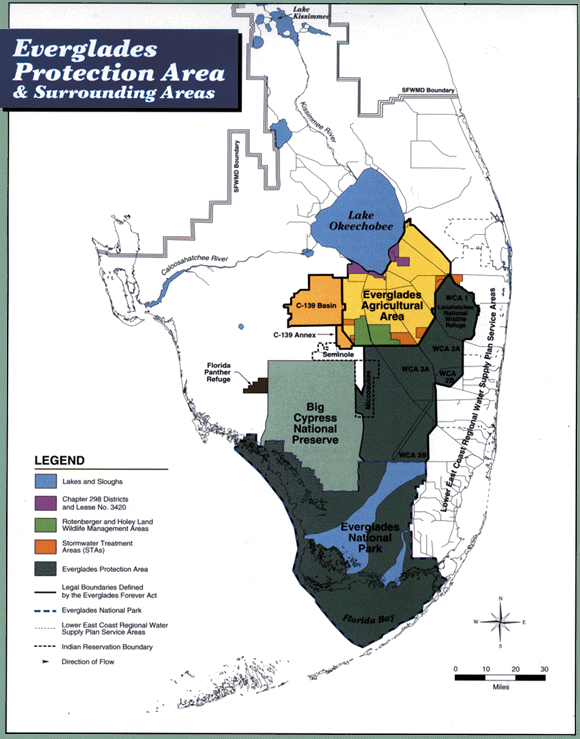
This map shows the Everglades Agricultural Area, as designated by the Central and Southern Florida Project

The Everglades Agricultural Area Environmental Protection District (EAA EPD), better known as simply the Everglades Agricultural Area (EAA), is an area extending south from Lake Okeechobee to the northern levee of Water Conservation Area 3A, from its eastern boundary at the L-8 canal to the western boundary along the L-1, L-2, and L-3 levees. The EAA incorporates almost 3,000 square kilometers (1,158 square miles) of highly productive agricultural land. The EAA was established by the State Legislature as a special district representing landowners within the EAA Basin for the purposes of ensuring environmental protection. Means include conducting scientific research on environmental matters related to air and water and land management practices and implementing the financing, construction, and operation of works and facilities designed to prevent, control, abate or correct environmental problems and improve the environmental quality of air and water resources.

== History ==
The Everglades Agricultural Area was designated by the Central and Southern Florida Project (C&SF Project) in 1948. The C&SF established 470,000 acres (1,900 km^{2}) for the Everglades Agricultural Area—27 percent of the Everglades prior to development.

== Sugar farming ==
Approximately 500,000 acres of the 700,000 acres of the EAA is controlled by sugar companies, namely U.S. Sugar and Florida Crystals. In late 2008, a land deal was in the works as U.S. Sugar offered to sell the US government just under 180,000 acres of land at $1.75 billion. The deal was repeatedly downsized until the South Florida Water Management District eventually rejected the deal in 2010.

== Reservoir project ==
Three above ground reservoirs are being built by the South Florida Water Management District as part of the Comprehensive Everglades Restoration Plan, including the A-1 parcel of the Everglades Agricultural Area. Construction of the reservoir was halted in 2009 during the negotiation of the failed U.S. Sugar land acquisition deal, after US taxpayers had already invested almost $250 million. In the summer of 2016, much of South Florida's waterways experienced massive toxic algae blooms caused by the discharge of billions of gallons of freshwater from Lake Okeechobee. Following the crisis, much public support was aroused pressuring the construction of the EAA to be moved ahead.

== See also ==
- Draining and development of the Everglades § Everglades Agricultural Area
- Everglades § Everglades Agricultural Area
- Everglades National Park
