= JohnBob Carlos =

American photographer and environmental activist

JohnBob Carlos Carlos Fernandez
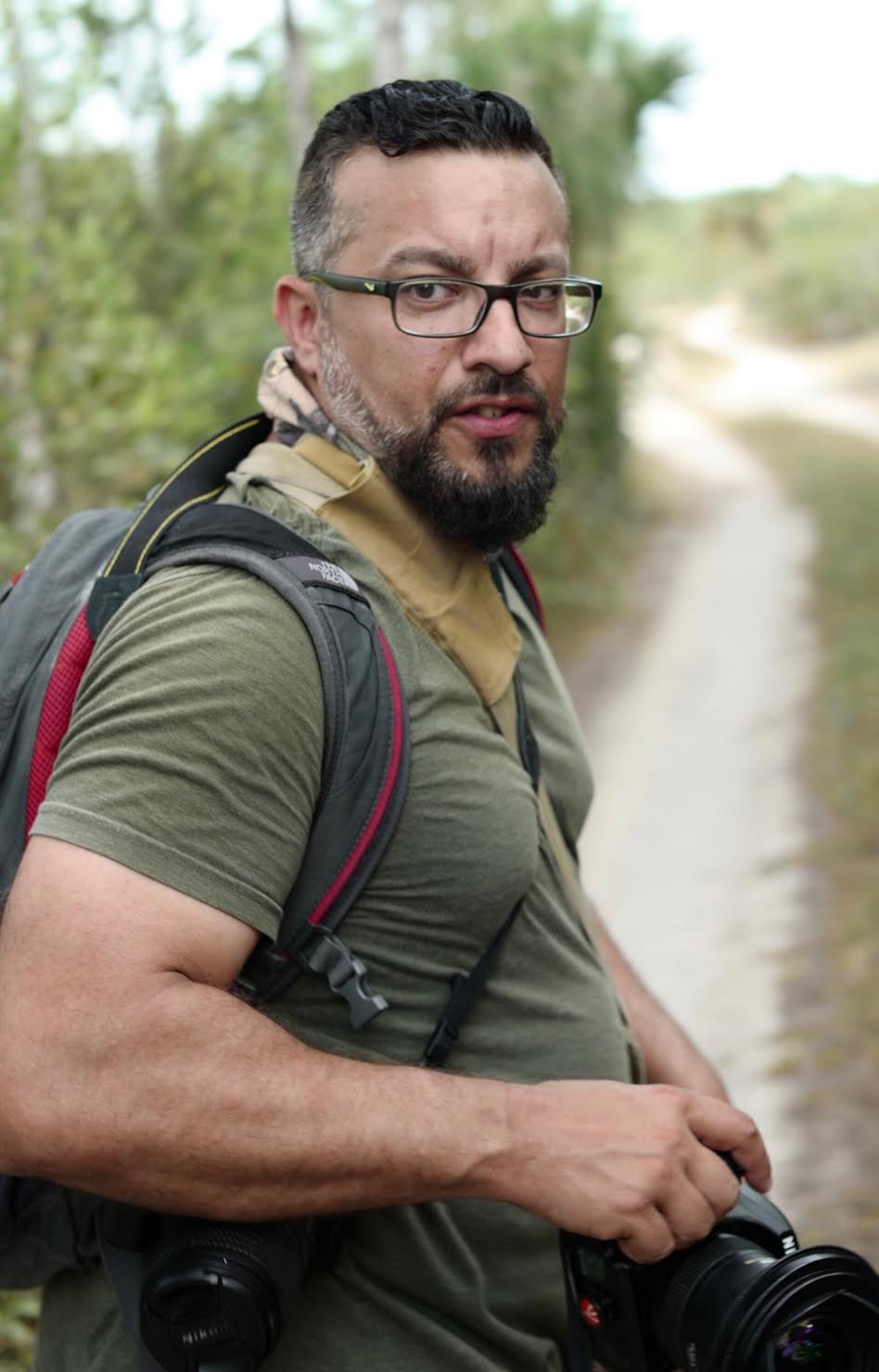
- JohnBob Carlos in the Everglades photo by Lisette Morales
- Occupations: Photographer; Environmental activist
- Website: Gallery Homepage

JohnBob Carlos (born 1974) is an American photographer and environmental activist living and working in Florida. His work consists mostly of color photography of the Florida Everglades landscape, its people, and culture.

== Early life ==
He was born in Miami, Florida to second generation Cuban parents.

== Career ==
Carlos photographs the wildlife and landscapes of Florida. He is a contributor of the Artful Activist collective an organization of visual artists and writers based in Miami, Florida, aiming at promoting grassroots activism.

== Activism ==
Carlos is a vocal opponent of fracking in the Everglades National Parks, and as a correspondent for ActivateNow and independent media, he was the first person to report onsite about the seismic survey area at Big Cypress National Preserve in the Everglades.

Carlos was also an opponent of the River of Grass Greenway (ROGG), a multimillion-dollar project that proposed a 12- to 14-foot expansion of 75 miles of the Tamiami Trail (US 41) to build a bicycle path in the Everglades. The ROGG $1.6M feasibility plan was rescinded by Collier County Commissioners on February 10, 2017 and by Miami-Dade County Commissioners in April 2017.

Between 2014 and 2017, Carlos participated in and documented the Walk for Mother Earth. The Walk for Mother Earth was an annual walk led by Betty Osceola, a Miccosukee tribe member of the Panther Clan, and spiritual leader Bobby C. Billie, who walked alongside citizens from Naples to Miami to raise public awareness.

== Photography exhibits ==
- 2015 Museum of the Everglades Solo Exhibit Healing Totem: The Photography of JohnBob Carlos September–October 2015
- 2017 Fort Lauderdale Historical Society Solo Exhibit Healing Waters: The Photography of JohnBob Carlos December 2017
- 2017 Art Basel Miami LUSH Group Show at Fancy Nasty Studios
- 2017 Naples Art Association Group Show Animals Fact and Fable November 2017
- 2018 Museum of the Everglades Solo Exhibit JohnBob Carlos: Hurricane Irma Collection January 2018
- 2018 Museum of the Everglades Selected photos in Group Show at the Pauline Reeves Gallery in celebration of the 50th Anniversary of the movie Wind Across the Everglades directed by Nicholas Ray and produced by Budd Schulberg
- 2018 FATVillage (Flagler+Arts+Technology) Selected Photos included in Group Show in Close Proximity
- 2018 FIU Green Library Group Show Awaken Florida organized and curated by JohnBob Carlos with a selection of his photography and artworks by other artists April 2018 followed by a Solo Exhibit JohnBob Carlos: Florida Awaken Photography April–October 2018
