= Elam Stoltzfus =

American film producer

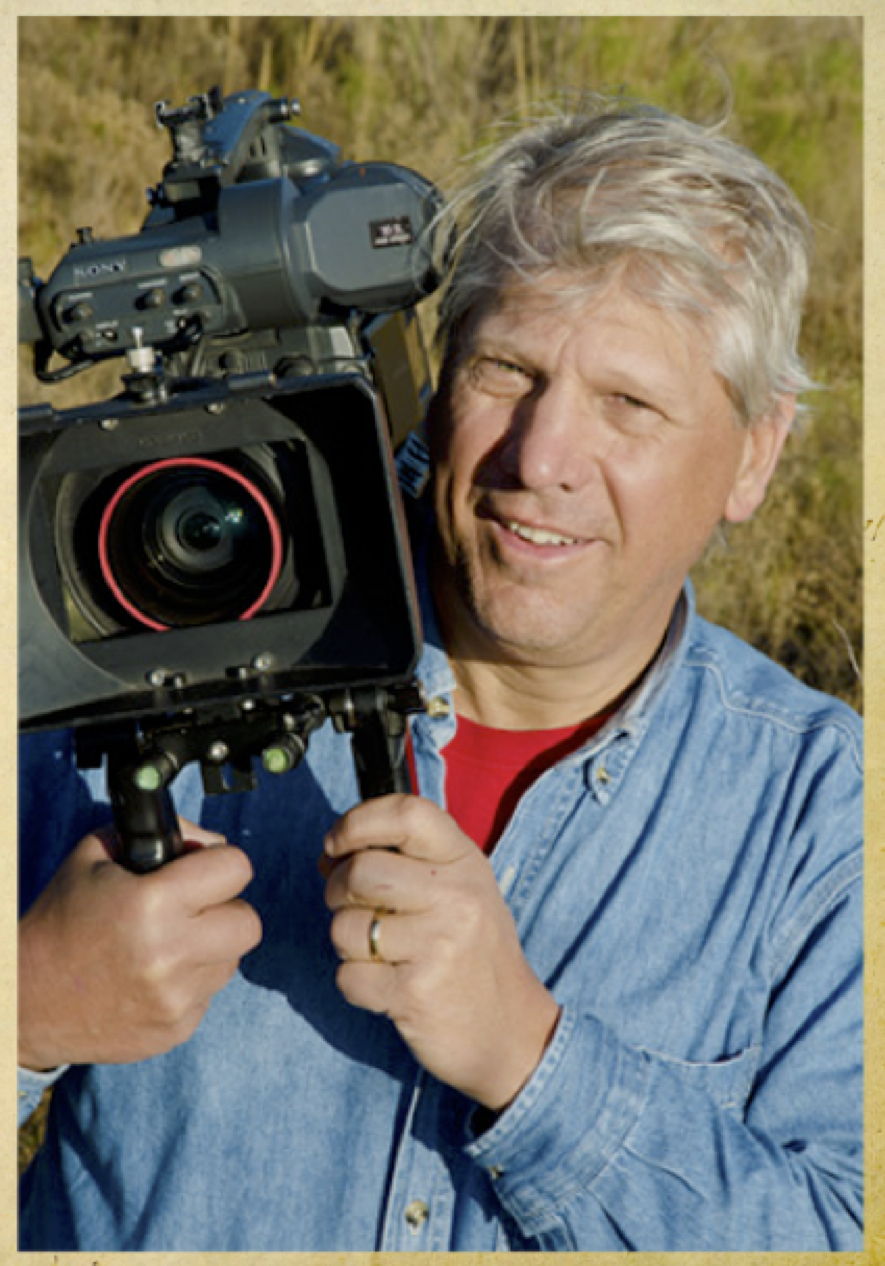
- Stoltzfus in 2012
- Born: Elam Stevie Stoltzfus; May 18, 1957 (age 69); Pennsylvania, U.S.
- Education: Florida State University
- Years active: 1990-present
- Spouse: Esther Stoltzfus (1985-present)
- Website: www.liveoakproductiongroup.com

Elam S. Stoltzfus (born 1957) is an American environmental documentary filmmaker.

== Early life ==
Stoltzfus was born into an Amish family of nine in Pennsylvania in 1957. During his later teens Elam left the Amish community, purchased a car and a camera. He first attended Chipola College and then earned his B.S. in Media & Communication from Florida State University's College of Communication and Information.

== Career ==
Stoltzfus is devoted to working on nature documentaries in Florida and has traveled all over the state documenting stories of Florida's varied environment. He has made five hour-long nature documentaries, with the genesis for this work beginning with the half-hour "Visions of Florida: the Photographic Art of Clyde Butcher" produced in 1990. He first met Clyde Butcher as the cinematographer for the project Visions of Florida. This was his first award-winning project; he received a Louis Wolfson award for "Best in Artistic Expression." This film was also his first to be released nationwide through Public Television. After a six-year stint as a media designer for the state of Florida, in 2000 he began work on "Living Waters: Aquatic Preserves of Florida" featuring 12 aquatic preserves located around the state. His next project was "Apalachicola River: An American Treasure" on the iconic waterway of the Florida panhandle. After this he completed "Big Cypress: The Western Everglades" featuring Clyde Butcher's backyard. Following this was "Kissimmee Basin: The Northern Everglades". As a way to tie all of these Everglades projects together, he was a member of the four-team expedition group, the Florida Wildlife Corridor Expedition. The team traveled 1000 miles in 100 days from the Everglades to the Okefenokee Swamp. This journey was documented in the film of the same name and garnered Stoltzfus a Suncoast Regional Emmy in the Documentary category. According to Walton Outdoors, Stoltzfus is currently working on a project involving Walton County's Coastal Dune Lakes as "bringing awareness to [the] lakes is key to helping preserve our environment... we are fortunate now to have an educational documentary in the works." The film was featured on PBS' Public Television Earth Day weekend in 2015.

== Personal life ==
Elam Stoltzfus married his wife, Esther Yoder Stoltzfus in 1985. Together, they have two children, Nicholas and Lars.

== Awards and honors ==
In 2010 Stoltzfus was recognized by the Florida Fish & Wildlife Conservation Commission for documenting wildlife in the state of Florida.

In May 2013, Stoltzfus was invited to speak at Florida State University's Spring Commencement Ceremony. That year, governor Rick Scott recognized Elam and the Florida Wildlife Corridor Expedition team for their efforts to aid in conservation.

In 2014, Stoltzfus won a Suncoast Emmy in the category of best documentary for the Florida Wildlife Corridor film. He received both the 2014 Conservation of the year award by the Florida Wildlife Federation at the Annual Awards Banquet in Naples, Florida, and the 2014 Sierra Club of Florida Cypress Award for Conservation Education.

== Filmography ==
- Great Florida Cattle Drive (2017)
- Coastal Dune Lakes: Jewels of Florida's Emerald Coast (2015)
- Florida Wildlife Corridor Expedition: Everglades to Okefenokee (2013)
- Kissimmee Basin: the Northern Everglades (2012)
- Photoshop Made Simple by Clyde Butcher (2010)
- Big Cypress Swamp: Western Everglades (2009)
- Will McLean: Songs about Florida (2007)
- Our Legacy: Florida Communities Trust (2006)
- Apalachicola River: an American Treasure (2006)
- Our Signature: the Wild and Scenic Loxahatchee River (2005)
- Living Waters: Aquatic Preserves of Florida (2004)
- Visions of Florida: Photographic Art of Clyde Butcher (1990)
