= Betty Osceola =

Miccosukee Everglades Educator and Conservasionist

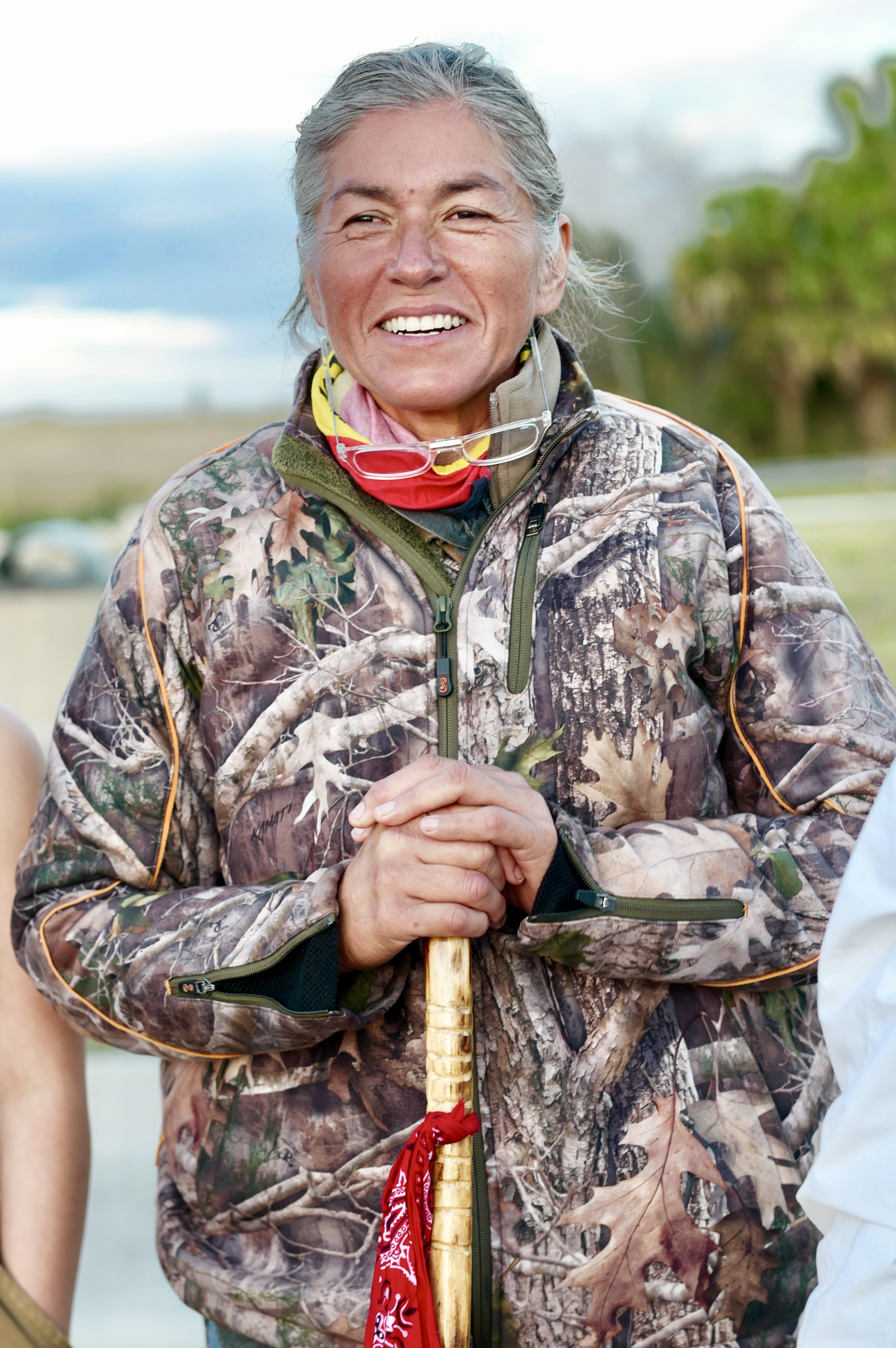
- Osceola at Lake Okeechobee (2019) by Lisette Morales
- Born: Betty Osceola; August 8, 1967 (age 59); Ochopee, Florida, U.S.
- Occupations: Airboat Captain, Everglades Educator, Miccosukee tribal judge & Miccosukee Everglades Advisory Committee
- Known for: Everglades advocacy and prayer walks
- Awards: Forbes Sustainability Leaders (2025), Defender of the Everglades (2024), John V. Kabler Award (2018)
- Website: https://buffalotigerboats.com/

Betty Osceola (born August 8, 1967) is an American environmental activist, educator, and airboat captain. A member of the Miccosukee Tribe of Indians of Florida and the Panther Clan, she is known for her advocacy to protect the Everglades, which she identifies as her ancestral homeland.

Osceola has led numerous public prayer walks and environmental awareness campaigns across South Florida, often focusing on threats to Indigenous land, water quality, and climate justice. She has been recognized as a Miccosukee tribal judge and serves on the Miccosukee Everglades Advisory Committee.

Born and raised in the Everglades, she learned about traditional hunting and fishing from her father. Today, she continues to share her knowledge of the region as the operator of Buffalo Tiger Airboat Tours on Tamiami Trail (U.S. Route 41) in Miami, Florida.

== Early life ==
In a January 2019 interview for the PBS series American Experience: The Swamp, Osceola shared details about her childhood in the Everglades. She described living in a chickee hut with four walls, noting that her mother and grandmother had lived in traditional open-sided huts. As a child, she often spent entire days barefoot, exploring the swamp. Osceola also reflected on the traditional practices of her community, such as growing corn and pumpkin on tree islands, and expressed concern that pollution has made the waters too contaminated to continue living off the land as her ancestors once did.

== Prayer Walks ==
Prayer walks are a longstanding practice in Indigenous communities, grounded in ceremony, reverence for the land, and spiritual responsibility. Osceola, has continued this tradition through organized prayer walks across South Florida. These walks are held to honor the Earth, build awareness, and offer spiritual healing in places facing ecological and cultural harm. Rooted in Miccosukee teachings, Osceola's prayer walks have taken place in sacred and threatened areas such as Big Cypress National Preserve, Lake Okeechobee, Loop Road, and the Miami Circle. Open to participants of all backgrounds, these walks are not acts of protest but of prayerful presence—centering Indigenous values of respect, relationship, and protection of the natural world.

== Prayer Walks and Public Demonstration ==
=== 2025: Indigenous-Led Prayer Gatherings and Public Actions ===
==== Interfaith Prayer Vigils ====
Osceola organized weekly interfaith vigils held every Sunday afternoon in opposition to the operations of the South Florida Detention Facility, commonly known by the moniker Alligator Alcatraz, an immigration detention center located in Big Cypress National Preserve near the Everglades. The gatherings brought together leaders from various faith traditions, including pastors, priests, and Buddhist clergy, who joined Osceola in prayer and ceremony. The vigils emphasized both spiritual solidarity and environmental awareness, drawing attention to the moral and ecological implications of maintaining a large detention center within the Everglades ecosystem. Through these events, Osceola sought to unite diverse communities around shared values of compassion, justice, and the protection of sacred lands.

==== September 2025: Public Demonstration with Amnesty International ====
During a September event at the camp gates, Amy Fischer, Director of Refugee and Migrant Rights at Amnesty International USA, called the detention camp “a human rights disaster" following Amnesty International's campaign to shut down the site.

==== July 13, 2025: Clyde Butcher Gallery event to protect the Everglades ====
Oscela joined photographer Clyde Butcher to educate the unfamiliar about the beauty, the power and fragility of the Everglades in light of the detention facility, reminding participants to "always be mindful of how you want to make your footsteps, because somebody else is going to cross your footsteps and pick up that memory and it becomes a part of them."

==== June 28, 2025: Don't Destroy the Everglades, Stop Alligator Alcatraz ====
Following the initial prayer gathering on June 22, Osceola organized a second Indigenous-led demonstration to continue raising awareness and opposition to the Dade-Collier Training and Transition Airport (TNT) project. During this event, participants observed a significant increase in semi-truck and vehicle traffic entering the facility, which was actively under construction at the time. The action aimed to highlight ongoing environmental and cultural concerns as development progressed.

==== June 22, 2025: Defend the Sacred, No Alligator Alcatraz ====
Osceola organized an Indigenous-led prayer gathering in opposition to the proposed Dade-Collier Training and Transition Airport (TNT) project (formerly known as the Everglades Jetport). The event drew an estimated 700 to 1,000 participants from diverse backgrounds who voiced concern over plans to construct the first federally-funded, state-run camp for immigration detainees. As of June 24, 2025, The Miami Herald reported that construction on the site had begun.

=== 2023: Honor the Ancestors around the Miami Circle in Brickell ===
==== March 18, 2023: Honor the Ancestors ====
Osceola organized a mile-long peaceful prayer walk in opposition to the developing of a site of historical significance not only for Native American culture but for humanity. The walkers journeyed from Brickell Park, around the Miami Circle, stopping at 444 Brickell Avenue and ending at 77 SE 5th Street, at this last site archaeologists have uncovered human remains, and other artifacts possibly pre-dating the pyramids of Egypt. The site is located in an area that used to be inhabited by the Tequesta people for thousands of years and in the vicinity of the Miami Circle in Brickell, Miami.

=== 2021: Prayers Walks and Hikes ===
==== April 10, 2021: Signs Across the Alley Hike ====
Osceola organized and lead a group of concerns citizens for a one-day hike into Big Cypress National Preserve to educate the public and to protest a proposed oil drilling plan. After the hike protesters lined up on the side of Interstate 75.

==== February 6–12, 2021: Prayer Walk around Lake Okeechobee ====
Osceola and Reverend Houston R. Cypress organized a second walk around the perimeter of Lake Okeechobee, with a group of 26 participants for a seven-day long and 118-mile prayer. In addition to praying for the healing of Mother Earth the walk was in opposition to the EPA State Assumption of Dredge and Fill Permitting under Section 404 of the Clean Water.

==== January 2–3, 2021: Prayer Walk on U.S. Highway 41 ====
Osceola and Reverend Houston R. Cypress organized and lead a group of 41 participants during a two-day long and 36-mile prayer walk on State Road 41, from East to West, in Big Cypress National Preserve in opposition to the EPA State Assumption of Dredge and Fill Permitting under Section 404 of the Clean Water. The group started on East entrance of Loop Road and ended on the second day in Carnestown, Florida.

=== 2019: Prayer Walk on Historic Loop Road ===
==== December 7–8, 2021: Prayer Walk for Healing of the Land ====
Osceola and Reverend Houston R. Cypress from the Otter Clan, organized and lead a group of over 60 participants during a two-day long and 31-mile prayer walk in the historic Loop Road in Ochopee, Florida.

=== 2019: Prayer Walk for the Healing of the Waters ===
==== January 26 to February 3, 2019: Prayer Walk around Lake Okeechobee ====
Osceola and six other participants walked 118-mile along the perimeter of Lake Okeechobee to bring awareness to water quality issues in Lake Okeechobee. She carried a red bandanna to raise awareness about missing and murdered Indigenous women.

=== 2016: Standing Rock - Dakota Access Pipeline ===
Osceola made two trips from the Everglades to the Standing Rock Indian Reservation to deliver supplies to the Dakota Access Pipeline protests.

=== 2015-2017: Walk for Mother Earth on U.S. Highway 41 ===
The Walk for Mother Earth was founded by Betty Osceola in collaboration with her uncle, Bobby C. Billie (1946–2018), a respected spiritual leader and member of the Council of the Original Miccosukee Simanolee Nation Aboriginal Peoples. The grassroots initiative brought together Indigenous communities, scientists, environmentalists, and concerned citizens in opposition to the proposed River of Grass Greenway (ROGG), a bike path planned along Florida State Road 41 (Tamiami Trail) between Naples and Miami.

Each year, Osceola and Billie led a multi-day prayer walk along the route to raise awareness about the ecological and cultural threats posed by the project. They advocated through public education efforts and by speaking at hearings before the Collier County and Miami-Dade County Boards of Commissioners. As a result of their activism and community support, both counties ultimately withdrew from the project. After Billie's passing in 2018, Osceola has continued to lead prayer walks across South Florida.

== PBS Native America, Season 2 (2023) ==
Episode: Betty Osceola - Earth Protector. Documentary, United States. Description: Betty Osceola draws on generations of Miccosukee teachings about respecting all living things and protecting the world in which we live. She leads prayer walks to raise awareness of threats to the environment and to organize people to save the Florida Everglades. Airing: October 24, 2023.

== Film: Path of the Panther (2022) ==
Path of the Panther (Documentary), United States, 88 minutes running time. Osceola is featured in this film directed by Eric Bendick and produced by Carlton Ward, Eric Bendick, and Tori Linder. Executive produced by Leonardo DiCaprio. Release date February 24, 2023.

== Welcome to Florida: Betty Osceola and the Miccosukee Tribe (2021) ==
"Welcome to Florida" podcast with Craig Pittman (writer), episode 52, 50.5 minutes. Guest is the environmental advocate Betty Osceola, owner of Buffalo Tiger Airboat Tours and coordinator of the Walk For Mother Earth project.

== Awards ==
August 2025: Osceola was recognized as Forbes Sustainability Leaders 2025.

March 2024: Osceola received the Marjory Stoneman Douglas Defender of the Everglades award from the Friends of the Everglades.

January 2018: Osceola received the John V. Kabler Grassroots Organizing Award during the Everglades Coalition annual summit.
