= Tenmile Corner, Florida =

Tenmile Corner
- Unincorporated Community
- Location within Florida
- Coordinates: 25°36′57″N 80°51′26″W
- Country: United States
- State: Florida
- County: Miami-Dade
- Elevation: 3 ft (0.91 m)

Tenmile Corner is an unincorporated community in western Miami-Dade County, Florida, located on the border between Big Cypress National Preserve and Everglades National Park. It is the site of an NPS weather station.

== Geography ==
Tenmile Corner is located at 25.6159407, −80.8572889 with an elevation of 1 meter (3 feet).
