= Path of the Panther =

Environmental conservation documentary

- Directed by: Eric Bendick
- Written by: Eric Bendick
- Produced by: Eric Bendick; Carlton Ward Jr. Tori Linder; Thomas Winston
- Starring: Carlton Ward Jr. Betty Osceola; Elton Langford
- Cinematography: Danny Schmidt; Katie Bryden
- Music by: Kevin Matley
- Production company: National Geographic
- Release date: February 23, 2023 (United States)
- Country: United States
- Language: English

Path of the Panther is a documentary directed by Eric Bendick that follows National Geographic photographer Carlton Ward Jr. as he documents the conservation efforts to protect the endangered Florida panther and its habitat in the Florida Everglades. The panther coexists with other wildlife in ecosystems increasingly threatened by development and habitat fragmentation.

The film influenced environmental legislation, particularly the Florida Wildlife Corridor Act, which seeks to safeguard and connect over 18 million acres of habitat. The documentary highlights the importance of preserving Florida's wildlife corridors and demonstrates how media can drive impactful legislative action.

== Synopsis ==
Path of the Panther follows National Geographic photographer Carlton Ward Jr. as he and a team of biologists, ranchers, and Indigenous communities work to prevent environmental degradation in the Florida Everglades. The documentary focuses on the endangered Florida panther, which now occupies less than 5% of its historic range due to habitat loss and human encroachment.

Central to the film is the Florida Wildlife Corridor, a network of over 18 million acres of protected and private lands that offer a potential solution to habitat fragmentation and the species' population recovery. The film highlights how conserving this corridor is crucial for the panther’s long-term survival and for maintaining Florida’s biodiversity. It illustrates how conservation efforts can help restore the panther’s natural habitat and ensure its long-term survival while balancing the needs of Florida’s growing population.

The documentary also features Betty Osceola, an Indigenous environmental advocate, who plays a key role in representing the Seminole Tribe's perspective on land conservation and the interconnectedness of ecosystems. Her voice emphasizes the cultural and ecological importance of preserving the Florida panther's habitat as part of a broader effort to protect Indigenous lands and wildlife corridors.

The documentary also underscores the similar challenges faced by Florida’s cattle ranchers, known as "Florida cowboys," who, like the panthers, rely on diminishing open lands threatened by urban development.Path of the Panther explores how these stakeholders along with scientists and conservationists seek to balance preservation of both Florida's ecological systems with the needs of Florida’s growing human population.

== Production ==
The documentary took nearly five years to film, using innovative camera trap techniques to capture footage of the Florida panther without disturbing its natural environment. Over 800 hours of camera trap footage were utilized, providing a rare glimpse into the behavior of the species. Camera traps are digital cameras equipped with infrared sensors that detect movement and heat, triggering the camera to record footage with minimal wildlife disturbance.

In 2016, photographer Carlton Ward Jr. successfully captured groundbreaking footage of a female panther in the wild using high-definition camera traps, marking the first time such close footage of the elusive Florida panther had been recorded. Ward faced numerous challenges while setting up these camera traps, including bears dismantling his equipment and Hurricane Irma sinking his rig. This footage, documented in Path of the Panther, became a pivotal moment for conservation efforts, as Ward’s images helped fuel the push for the creation of the Florida Wildlife Corridor to protect the panther’s habitat and restore critical lands.

The film was produced by Eric Bendick, Carlton Ward Jr., Tori Linder and Thomas Winston, with executive producers including Leonardo DiCaprio, Howard G. Buffett, and Jennifer Davisson. Cinematographers including Danny Schmidt and Katie Bryden contributed to the high-definition scenes of Florida’s wildlife.

== Release and reception ==
The documentary was initially released in select theaters across Florida before becoming available on Disney+ in May 2023. Its release on Disney+ expanded its audience and brought further attention to environmental issues facing the Everglades.

Path of the Panther received praise for its cinematography and the way it highlights Florida’s natural habitats. Critics noted the film’s focus on the balance between conservation efforts and economic development. Reviewers from Film Cred and the Wild & Scenic Film Festival lauded the documentary for its emotional depth, specifically how it connects the lives of Florida panthers with broader environmental issues like habitat loss and fragmentation. The International Wildlife Film Festival commended the documentary for its use of camera traps and its impactful message about preserving wildlife corridors.

== Impact ==
Path of the Panther played a role in raising awareness about habitat fragmentation and the need to protect the Florida panther’s dwindling population. The documentary was part of a broader impact media project supported by the Florida Wildlife Corridor Foundation and the National Geographic Society. The project resulted in a feature in National Geographic Magazine and eventually the documentary itself.

The film features a diverse group of narrators, many of whom played a role in the successful passage of the Florida Wildlife Corridor Act, signed into law by Gov. Ron DeSantis. Describing the panther as a "ghost", one narrator said that allowing the world to see who the panther is may be the “spark” that ignites saving the Florida Corridor. "It's so hard to show that story," he said. "And you have to show people to create that connection and that love. There's so much disappointment, then there's this image of hope." Another narrator said, “The panther is showing us that it’s not too late...There’s no limit to the balance that we can bring back to this entire continent.”

Media coverage and outreach from Path of the Panther contributed to the unanimous passage of the Florida Wildlife Corridor Act in 2021. This bipartisan legislation focuses on protecting wildlife migration routes and natural habitats amid increasing development pressures in Florida in one of the fastest-growing states in the U.S. The act preserves over 18 million acres of public and private lands, ensuring critical wildlife corridors remain intact for species like the Florida panther. The documentary emphasized the importance of these corridors, motivating lawmakers to prioritize conservation efforts at the state level and contributing to legislative change.
