= Arnie Bellini =

American businessman

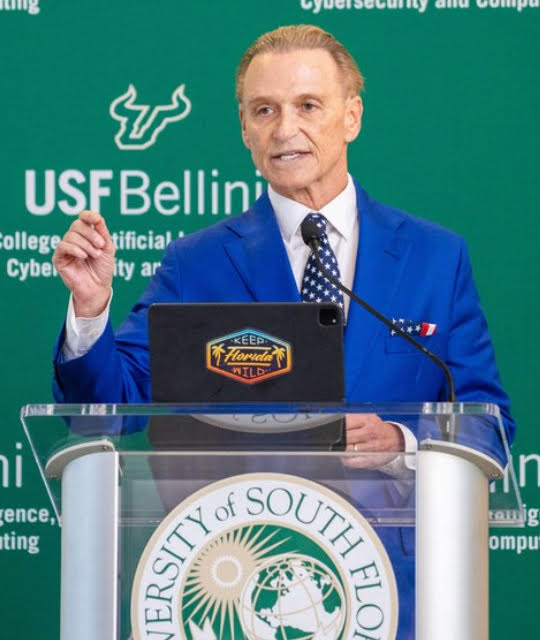
- Education: Tampa Catholic High School; University of Florida; University of South Florida
- Occupations: Founder and CEO of Bellini Capital
- Spouse: Lauren

Arnie Bellini is an American businessman, technology entrepreneur and advocate of sustainability. He is the founder and CEO of Bellini Capital and founder of ConnectWise, a business management software company based in Tampa, Florida. In 2019, ConnectWise sold for $1.5 billion, making it the first Tampa Bay-based technology company to reach unicorn status.

Bellini has been involved in initiatives related to cybersecurity, artificial intelligence, modernization of education, and natural resource preservation.

In 2025, Bellini and his wife, Lauren, donated $40 million to the University of South Florida (USF), establishing the Bellini College of Artificial Intelligence, Cybersecurity, and Computing to fill the gap of skilled professionals in artificial intelligence and cybersecurity. Bellini also led additional cybersecurity education and workforce readiness initiatives at USF and Saint Leo University.

Bellini has participated in sustainability efforts in Florida, including involvement in the passage of the Florida Wildlife Corridor Act and founding of the nonprofit LiveWildly.com.

He is a triathlete and endurance swimmer who crossed the English Channel in 2013 at the age of 54.

== Education ==
Bellini graduated from Tampa Catholic High School in 1976. He earned an accounting degree from the University of Florida (Summa Cum Laude) in 1980 and completed his MBA in Finance at the University of South Florida in 1981 (Summa Cum Laude).

== Career ==
Bellini began his career as a technology consultant with Price Waterhouse from 1981 to 1982.

In 1982, Bellini founded ConnectWise, a business automation platform for technology service and managed service providers that became a leader and innovator in the industry. In 2014, Bellini was awarded EY’s Technology Entrepreneur of the Year. ConnectWise grew under Bellini’s tenure to over 1,200 employees and $250 million annual recurring revenue before being sold in 2019 to private equity firm Thoma Bravo for $1.5 billion. Following the sale, 74 employees became millionaires.

After the sale of ConnectWise, Bellini founded Bellini Capital, where he serves as CEO. The firm invests in cybersecurity software, services, and related fields, and has stated a focus on environmental considerations alongside business growth.

In 2025 Bellini was named Tampa Bay Wave’s 2025 Tampa Tech Legend.

== Cybersecurity ==
Bellini has supported collaborations intended to expand cybersecurity education, workforce development, and the growth of technology companies in the Tampa Bay area.

In 2025, Bellini, CyberFlorida and the University of South Florida launched the CyberBay Summit, an annual cybersecurity conference held in Tampa Bay. The event brought together participants from artificial intelligence, cybersecurity, academia, government, and the military.

== Community involvement ==
After the sale of ConnectWise, Bellini announced an objective to create 70,000 technology jobs in Tampa Bay while also supporting environmental conservation. Subsequent initiatives expanded to other parts of Florida and have focused on the use of advanced technology in education, job creation, and environmental sustainability.

=== Sustainability ===
Bellini was involved in efforts supporting the 2021 Florida Wildlife Corridor Act, which designated 18 million acres of land as Florida’s Wildlife Corridor. The program has received $2.1 billion in state funding and $348 million in county funding and has reportedly protected 264,000 acres of land from development.

In 2022, Bellini founded LiveWildly.com, a nonprofit focused on public education and outreach related to the Florida Wildlife Corridor. He also funded and served as executive producer for Protect Our Paradise, a documentary series examining the threats facing Florida’s wildlife, water, and land due to factors like climate change and population growth. In 2025, the series received a Suncoast Emmy Award.

In 2024, Bellini worked with Polk County, Florida to preserve 639 acres of land and establish the Bellini Preserve as a public park.

In 2025, Bellini and his wife, Lauren, purchased Eagle Haven Ranch on Lake Kissimmee, placing 2,903 acres of the Florida Wildlife Corridor under permanent protections through federal conservation programs facilitated by Conservation Florida.

=== Education ===
Bellini supports modernizing education through partnerships with various institutions. In 2022, the Bellinis donated $10.6 million to establish the Bellini Center for Talent Development at the University of South Florida which provides career services, training, and internships for students. The Center connects students to job opportunities in the Tampa Bay business community and has a 90% job placement rate for students who participate in internships. Students in USF’s Muma College of Business and Bellini College of Artificial Intelligence, Cybersecurity and Computing participate in Center programming as part of their curriculum.

In 2025, the Bellinis donated $40 million to establish the Bellini College of Artificial Intelligence, Cybersecurity and Computing at the University of South Florida.

As of 2025, Bellini and his wife, Lauren, have donated $15 million to Tampa Catholic High School to support the creation of the Bellini Center for the Arts.

The Bellinis donated $1 million to St Leo University to create a modern cybersecurity curriculum to address the 4.8 million global job openings in cybersecurity.
