= FATVillage =

Arts district

The Flagler Arts and Technology Village, also known as FATVillage, is an arts district located in the city of Fort Lauderdale, Florida. FATVillage is a non profit arts district, that welcomes local artists and businesses. FATVillage was created by Doug McCraw and Lutz Hofbauer, with the intention of providing an outlet for young artists and designers to showcase their work. FATVillage allowed creative individuals to be immersed in a community of people with the same interests and goals. FATVillage was put in place for the local artist community in Fort Lauderdale to make their works more accessible to the public. FATVillage is also known for its "Last Saturday" Art Walks in which local artists and vendors display and sell their work.

== Past exhibitions ==
The exhibitions at FATVillage are contemporary art, and often reflect the artists views on current events. FATVillage debuted their exhibition “Ripped From the Headlines” on April 27, 2019. The exhibition included work from 18 artists who displayed their views on topics that have been seen as controversial in media such as the Black Lives Matter Movement, the Me Too Movement, border walls, white supremacy, and the NRA. “Ripped From the Headlines” was curated by Elle Schorr. Another exhibition featuring contemporary art was "In Close Proximity" featuring JohnBob Carlos.

== Living in FATVillage ==
Since 2017, there has been over forty housing developments in the works at FATVillage. This increase in the amount of living space in the area can be attributed to, in part, to the increasing attention that FATVillage has brought to the Flagler Village area of downtown Fort Lauderdale. According to Fort Lauderdale Magazine, there are nearly 1,000 multifamily apartment units located in FATVillage. However, given the lack of space available for growth, expansion is expected to slow down as more residents move in to the area. As of 2017, the average price for land in FATVillage is around $350 per square ft of space.

Recently, urban development company Urban Street Development, the same team responsible for assisting in the development of FATVillage, announced a new housing project under works in FATVillage. As reported by Ron Hurtbise in the Sun Sentinel, this new project - The Forge Lofts - will be FATVillages first residential development in which buyers can actually own residential property in the area. Before, interested tenants were only able to rent residential space. The brand new, seven-story, 33-unit project is expected to be completed by mid-2020. As of now, pre-construction prices currently range from the mid - $300,000 to the mid - $800,000 (Hurtbise).
