= Carlton Ward Jr. =

American photographer

R. Carlton Ward Jr. is a photographer with National Geographic Society. The Edge of Africa was his first book, a result of eight months in the tropical rain forests of Gabon. He documented Mali's elephants in Mali for the cover of Smithsonian Magazine and a chapter in the National Geographic book Great Migrations. His book Conservation Photography was a product of his masters thesis on ecology. In 2009 his book Florida Cowboys was published. It earned a silver medal at the Florida Book Awards.

Ward founded the Legacy Institute for Nature & Culture (LINC), a non-profit group advocating for the protection of Florida’s natural and cultural heritage through art.

Ward was featured in Popular Photography Magazine as part of a profile of three photographers working to save "vanishing America". He helped organize and led The Florida Wildlife Corridor Expedition. Ward is also the lead photographer and central figure in the 2022 documentary Path of the Panther, which focuses on his efforts to protect the endangered Florida panther and its habitat through the Florida Wildlife Corridor initiative.

Ward is a founding fellow of the International League of Conservation Photographers. In 2024, he received the Ansel Adams Award for Conservation Photography.

Additionally, Ward is a great-grandson of Florida's 25th governor, Doyle E. Carlton.
