= Florida Wildlife Corridor =

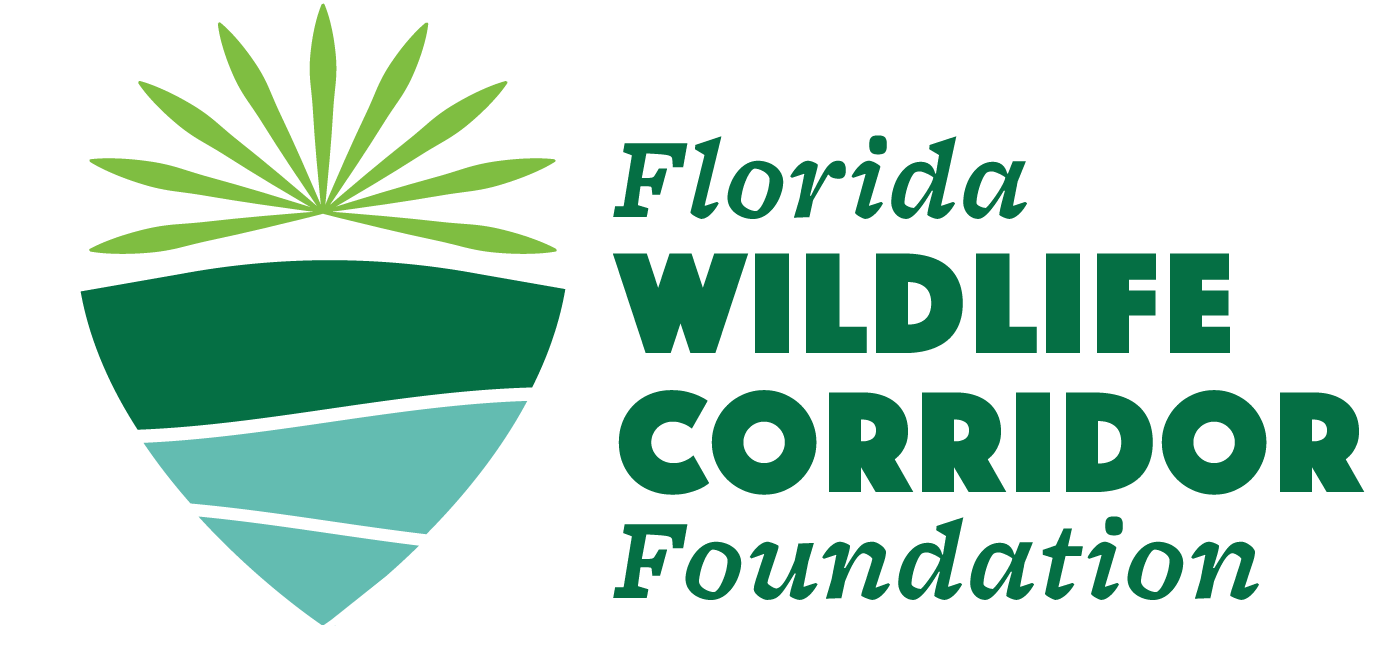
- The Florida Wildlife Corridor’s logo.
- Founded: March 1, 2010
- Established: April 22, 2010
- Founder: Carlton Ward Jr. Dr. Tom Hoctor
- Headquarters: St. Petersburg, FL
- Official language: English
- General Secretary: Maurice Pearson
- CEO: Mallory Lykes Dimmitt
- Board of directors: PJ Marinelli; Dr. Zak Gezon; Blake Poole; Maurice Pearson; Tiffany Busby; Kathryn Fuller; Shawn Hamilton; Oscar Anderson; Lynn Cherry; Scott Nolan; Dr. Thomas Eason; Elizabeth Moore; George W Lange Jr.
- Website: Florida Wildlife Corridor

The Florida Wildlife Corridor (FLWC) is a statewide network of nearly 18 million acres of connected ecosystems containing state parks, national forests, and wildlife management areas that support wildlife and human occupation. The corridor seeks to connect wildlife habitats, reducing their fragmentation and the subsequent declines in plant and animal populations caused by human activities The Florida Wildlife Corridor was conceived by Tom Hoctor, director of the University of Florida's Center for Landscape and Conservation Planning, and Carlton Ward Jr., with further inspiration partly from Lawton Chiles. It is championed by the Florida Wildlife Corridor Foundation and other major organizations, including Walt Disney World. The corridor consists of more than 40% of the state including planned areas of conservation. The FLWC is made possible by a bipartisan law passed in 2021 and involves efforts by government leaders and businessmen as well as conservationist. The initiative also has public support from Florida residents as it also helps to protect privately owned farmland.

The corridor is home to 60 species at risk of extinction such as the crested caracara, snail kite, Florida grasshopper sparrow, red-cockaded woodpecker, whooping crane, wood stork, American Crocodile, American Flamingo, West Indian manatee, Gulf sturgeon, Okaloosa darter, Florida sand skink, Miami blue, Southern florida rainbow snake, and eastern indigo snake. Many of these species such as the Florida black bear, Florida panther and Florida scrub jay have seen an increase in survival rates.

== Florida Wildlife Corridor Act ==
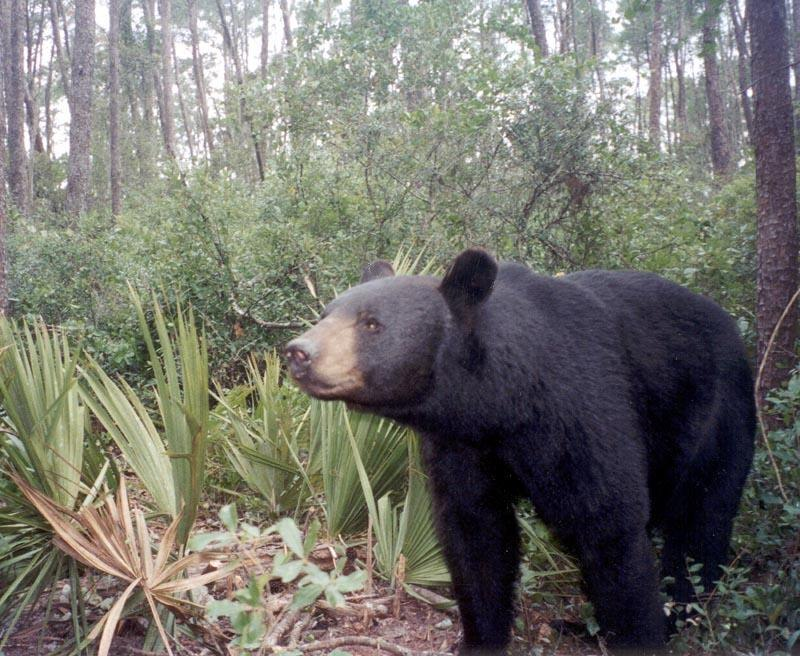
A Florida black bear has triggered a remote camera set by biologists. The bear is in the sand pine scrub of the Ocala National Forest, which supports the highest-density population of black bears in North America.

The Florida Wildlife Corridor Act was passed in 2021 to protect the only remaining intact wildlife corridor east of the Mississippi that is still inhabited by a native puma, the Florida panther. As of 2025, $2 billion plus has been allocated in Florida to pay landowners in the Florida Wildlife Corridor for keeping their property open and free of development. Since the Act was passed, nearly 264,000 acres of land within the corridor have been secured for conservation.

Arnie Bellini, a Tampa technology entrepreneur whose mission is to balance the economy and ecology in the state of Florida reinvigorated the cause resulting in the passage of the Act, creating political momentum that won bipartisan and unanimous support. Its passage marked the culmination of a decade-long effort by conservationists, scientists, and policymakers to secure funding and legal protections for the Florida Wildlife Corridor. Following the Act’s passage, Bellini founded LiveWildly.com, a nonprofit committed to educating Floridians about the Corridor, to energize and support the conservation movement. He serves on the Florida Wildlife Corridor Foundation Board of Directors.

The Act is the result of over 40 years of conservation work, much of which was driven by Professor Larry Harris and Reed Noss. Starting in the 1980s, they realized that Florida's rapid development was causing serious habitat loss and fracturing, and the only way to address it was through large-scale conservation efforts. Assisted by one of Harris's students, David Maehr, brought forth information that Florida black bears were using habitat corridors that stretch across both public and private lands. This discovery inspired a statewide push for a “Florida Wildlife Corridor.” Over time, maps created by Harris, Noss, and others pinpointed these corridors and ecological networks, providing the research and science behind the Florida Wildlife Corridor initiative. Of the 18 million acres of connected corridors, 9.6 million acres are safeguarded wildlife areas, along with private lands the government has acquired through conservation easements. While the remaining 46% percent still remains unprotected.

The Florida government enhances the corridor by purchasing land owners' development rights across the state through a land acquisition process from the Florida Department of Environmental Protection which allows the landowners to continue operations on their land, but prevents them from developing it. Conservation easements are legal agreements defined as "perpetual, undivided interests in property to protect the natural, scenic, or open-space values of real property." In which a property owner commits to limiting the type and extent of development on their land, often in exchange for compensation. The property owner grants the right to enforce these restrictions to a qualified third party, such as a public agency or non-profit organization. Typically, these easements "run with the land," meaning they apply not only to the current owner but also to all future owners, ensuring that the restrictions remain in place, in perpetuity. Managed by the Florida Department of Environmental Protection, securing many conservation easements, further emphasized through the "Florida Forever" program, the state's initiative for acquiring and protecting conservation and recreational lands. Keeping in line with reinforcing the state's dedication to long-term environmental stewardship.

== Benefits of the Florida Wildlife Corridor ==
The Florida Wildlife Corridor is an essential part of Florida's landscape as well as the ecosystems within. Studies have shown that this corridor benefits the surrounding environment and the people who live in and around this area. One of the key benefits of the Florida wildlife corridor is that it plays a role in the protection of several sources of water in the surrounding area, for example rivers, estuaries, wetlands etc. Other benefits of this wildlife corridor include benefits to the people who reside in close proximity to this area by way of flood protection, ranching and fishing sectors, and the Everglades headwaters which is one of the sources that brings water to the reservoirs within the corridor and the driving force behind the preservation of a large portion of Florida's drinkable water. This corridor also benefits the animals that are found there as it is a home for a large variety of species of aquatic and terrestrial animals which includes many of Florida's most endangered species like the Black bear, Gopher tortoise and the Swallow-tailed Kite, etc. The Florida wildlife corridor also provides benefits to the environment as it is home to over 60 species of plants that are either endangered or threatened like the scrub ziziphus, scrub palm and Everglades bully. This corridor also benefits the environment in other ways such as climate change by helping with the reduction of greenhouse gases in the atmosphere and acting as a temperature control mechanism for the corridor's ecosystems.

== Conservation impacts ==
A map view of Ocala National Forest.

Two studies found that the use of corridors created long-lasting benefits for black bear population in the state. Researchers compared the bear population in the Ocala National Forest to the population of a fragmented residential area of Lynne, Florida surrounded by roadways. The sites were chosen based on proximity to each other and differences in fragmentation, the Ocala National Forest falling within the area of the Florida Wildlife Corridor and city of Lynne right outside it. The bear population in Lynne was found to have a far lower growth rate than that which inhabited the national forest. The study suggested that car strikes partially contributed to the low population rate. Corridors along the highway were suggested to reduce bear mortalities.

A second study, done on the Osceola-Ocala wildlife corridor, found that it increased gene flow between two populations and provided linkages needed to maintain population structure and viability.

A 2023 study also shows how wildlife corridors improve the surrounding habitats and have the collaborative effect of wetland mitigation. These corridors also have the ability to help with the creation of new habitats by reconnecting fragmented sections of land.

In a 2022 study about road mortality of deer within the Florida Keys, it showed that the installation of wildlife fences resulted in a significant decrease in the road mortality rate of deer in these area vs the areas where these fences were not installed. This study shows a direct impact of the conservation of wildlife corridors and its benefits to the deer population in this area.

It is also important to note that though these wildlife corridors have significant benefits, they may also have negative side effects. Researchers studying the impact of wildlife corridors have largely come to the same consensus, that there is a possibility that the same way these corridors allow the movement of threatened and endangered animals, they may also unintentionally allow the movement of unwanted animals into these areas for example, an invasive or parasitic species. However, the researchers also agree that more studies need to be conducted to further understand the possible negative impacts of these corridors.

== Other aspects to consider ==
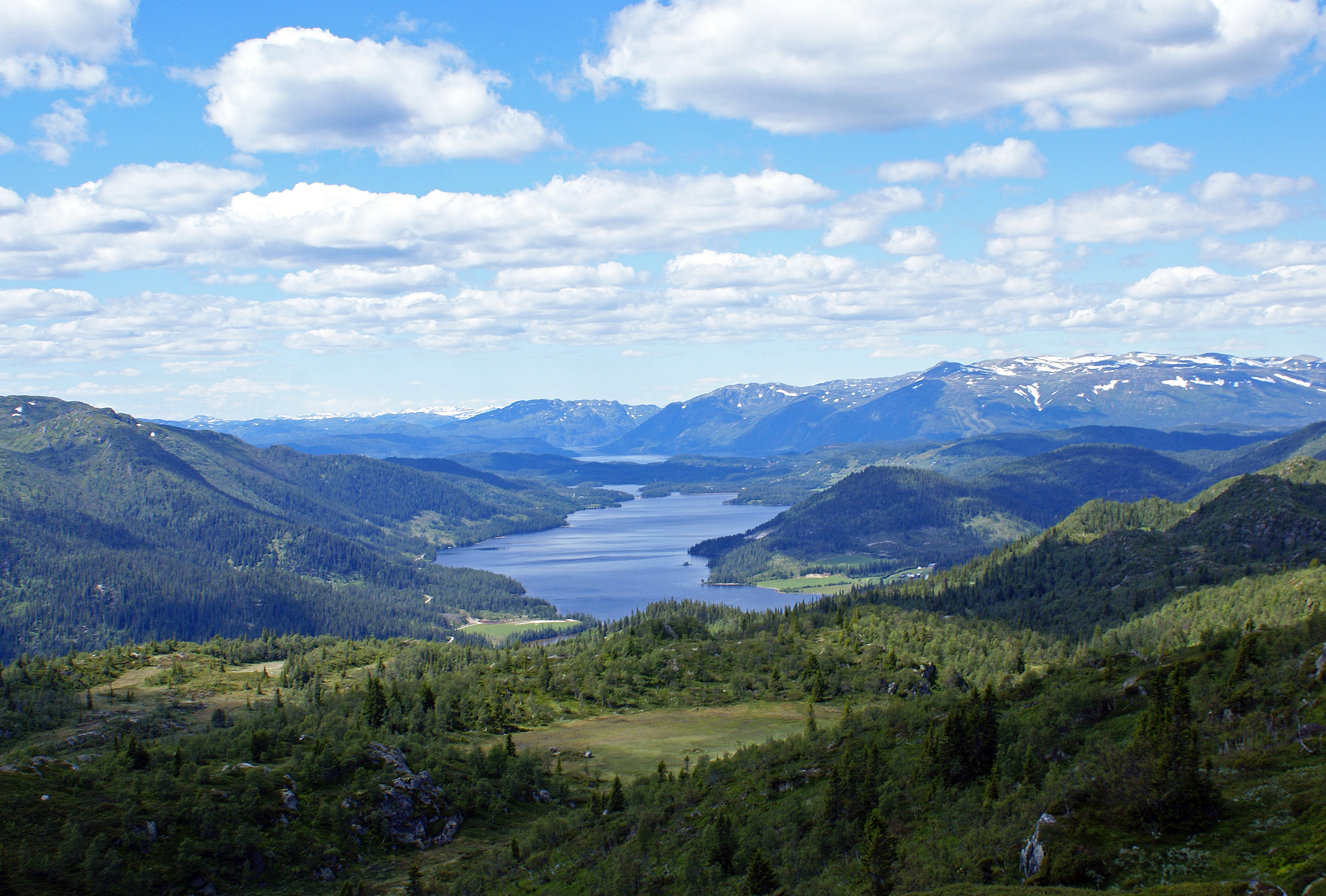
Edge effects are the natural transition from one structure to another. Featured in this example are, edge effects visible from the hills to the river, from the trees to the clearing.

An edge effect occurs as the landscape shifts from one habitat to another, due to changes in the population or community structures that exist at the boundary. This transition is typical and it has many benefits such as supporting species from both habitats it serves as a transition for as well as unique species that live only in the transition zone. However, there are some aspects to be aware of especially when the transition occurs from a wildlife habitat to an area of human residence.

A major goal of the Florida Wildlife Corridor is to increase survival in at risk species. Some of these species are predators and while they have an essential role in their community structure they could pose a risk to people. Likewise, as a result of increased travel through the corridors invasive species could be spread. Invasive species of note in the Florida State area include, the Tokay gecko, introduced in the Everglades in the 1960s to get rid of cockroaches, these nocturnal, territorial geckos eat native species like frogs, birds, and lizards, Burmese pythons, these invasive snakes can eat large prey, including wood storks, Lionfish that can eat commercially and recreationally valuable fish species like yellowtail snapper and Blue tilapia which can compete for resources in an area.

Wildlife corridors are intended to allow animals to move freely between habitats, but this movement can also facilitate the spread of diseases, particularly in wildlife populations that might not have been in contact before. For instance, diseases like chronic wasting disease or rabies could spread more easily when animals travel more widely, coming into contact with new populations. This disease is unlikely to transfer between animals and humans.

Additionally, while the primary goal of the Florida Wildlife Corridor is to create continuous paths for wildlife, there is the possibility that parts of the corridor could still be fragmented or disconnected due to development pressure or insufficient funding for conservation. Roads, power lines, and other infrastructure can break up habitats even within the designated wildlife corridors, making them less effective in terms of facilitating animal movement and migration. The creation of wildlife corridors can sometimes be at odds with economic development goals. For example, large-scale infrastructure projects such as highways, pipelines, or urban development may conflict with efforts to protect wildlife habitats. Additionally, expanding protected areas may limit opportunities for commercial development or natural resource extraction, such as logging or mining. Lastly, establishing and maintaining the Florida Wildlife Corridor requires ongoing investment in monitoring, management, and restoration activities. Over time, the cost of protecting, enhancing, and restoring habitats to ensure they remain viable for wildlife can be substantial.

== Landmarks ==
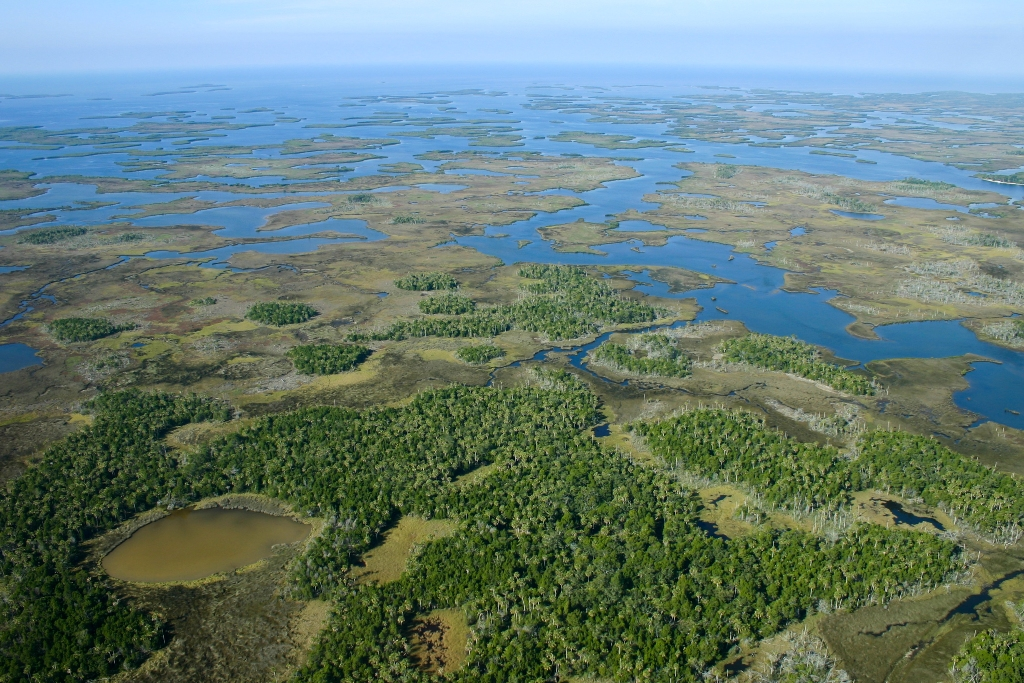
The Chassahowitzka National Wildlife Refuge is home to species of marine mammals such as the manatee and bottlenose dolphins, as well as reptiles such as sea turtles and hundreds of different fish species.The refuge was founded in 1943 with the intention of improving waterfowl survival in the area. Today, the refuge has shifted its focus to endangered West Indian manatees which use many of the refuge's waterways,

- The Suwannee River (Lower Suwannee National Wildlife Refuge) is an essential habitat for many of the species that the Corridor services. The river runs from Georgia through Florida so it also connects many of the waterways that allow for at risk species such as the West Indian Manatee to travel.
- The Chassahowitzka National Wildlife Refuge is likewise a habitat for endangered species. Among its many functions, it serves as a wintering location for species such as the whooping crane as well as a breeding ground for Florida's wildlife. The refuge also protects estuaries along Florida's west coast.
- The Withlacoochee State Forest is the third largest state forest and is a critical component of the Florida Wildlife Corridor for several reasons, playing a vital role in the preservation and connectivity of wildlife habitats across the state. It is also home to species like bald eagles, fox squirrels, and gopher tortoises.
- The Goethe State Forest, located near the Gulf of Mexico, has 19 different natural communities, each with unique plants and animals. These ecosystems are crucial for maintaining water quality, regulating floods, and preventing erosion. The forest helps provide that safe passage, enabling wildlife to move between habitats, find food and mates, and avoid the risks associated with isolated populations.
- The St. Marks National Wildlife Refuge is a coastal wildlife refuge that plays a key role in protecting Florida's coastal ecosystems, such as marshes, tidal flats, and estuaries. These ecosystems are vital for water quality, flood control, and coastal resilience. They also serve as nurseries for marine life, supporting fish and shellfish populations that are important to both the environment and the economy.
- The Steinhatchee Conservation Area is an important stopover site for many migratory birds traveling along the Gulf Coast. The marshes and wetlands provide essential resting and feeding areas for species like shorebirds, wading birds, and waterfowl as they migrate along the Atlantic Flyway. Some species, such as the American avocet and roseate spoonbill, rely on these coastal habitats for survival during their long migrations.
- The Apalachicola National Forest is the largest national forest in Florida, covering about 574,000 acres. The forest is one of the largest remaining areas of longleaf pine ecosystem in the southeastern United States. Longleaf pine forests are considered one of the most biodiversity-rich ecosystems in the U.S. and provide a habitat for a wide variety of species. The forest is also home to fire-dependent ecosystems, which need periodic wildfires to maintain ecological balance.
- The Apalachicola River Basin is the primary watershed for the Apalachicola River, which is one of Florida's most ecologically significant rivers. The river and its tributaries provide fresh water to a large portion of the surrounding land, which sustains a wide range of habitats for wildlife. The river also provides critical water resources for the surrounding communities, including agricultural areas, wildlife, and the natural landscapes within the Corridor.
- The Northwest Florida Greenway is a project that aims to connect forests from Alabama to Florida's Big Bend, creating a safe and scenic transportation route for people and wildlife.
- Nokuse Plantation is one of the largest private conservation areas in Florida, spanning over 54,000 acres of land. The size and connectedness of Nokuse Plantation are critical for species that require large territories or need to move freely across landscapes. For example, large mammals like the Florida black bear and deer benefit from the uninterrupted natural habitat provided by Nokuse.
- The Choctawhatchee River Water Management Area encompasses critical wetland and river ecosystems along the Choctawhatchee River. By protecting the Choctawhatchee River's riparian zone and wetlands, the CRWMA ensures the long-term survival of species that depend on these habitats, such as the alligators, otters, and wading birds like herons and egrets. Wetlands also act as water filters, improving water quality and maintaining the health of downstream ecosystems in the Gulf of Mexico.

== Urban ecology ==
There are many aspects that have impacted the landscape of Florida over time, displacing the wildlife and changing how they interact with one another and with their environment. Florida is home to some of the most travelled cities in the United States, ranking at #1 for domestic tourism and #2 for international tourists. The greatest impact to the native wildlife are the roadways that connect Florida's cities to one another but can have an isolating effect on the animals that call the state home. This phenomenon known as the road barrier effect leads to genetic isolation, smaller populations, disruptions in migration patterns, the loss of habitats and increased road mortality.

The Wildlife Corridor Act aims to utilize 18 millions acres of land across the state providing a considerable amount of green space for the wildlife. The Corridor has a beneficial relationship with Florida's tourism industry. Visitors can explore the parks forest and wildlife refuges that make up the corridor. Walt Disney World has also played a considerable role in protecting the local wildlife. Disney has its own conservation programs and there are properties owned by Disney that are wilderness spaces. Additionally the Disney Wilderness Preserve is a part of the Everglades ecosystem. To Disney, the green space is a benefit to their theme parks and resorts, immersing visitors in their environment. It aims to counteract the limitations placed on the wildlife caused by the parks' development in Central Florida. The Disney Wilderness Preserve also facilitates migration.

Nine in ten Florida residents live within 20 miles of the corridor. As such, public sentiment is in favor of the continued efforts of the Corridor. The message is clear, a thriving ecological environment allows for other areas such as Florida's economy to thrive as well. The Corridor creates over 100,000 jobs recreation, tourism, agriculture, ranching, forestry and other industries. The easements allow for tax breaks for the land owners as well. A report by Florida Atlantic University, Archbold Biological Station, Live Wildly Foundation found that about 170,000 acres of privately owned land is voluntarily conserved. Additionally, about 10 million acres of the state's floodplains are located within the corridor. Keeping these areas undeveloped protects cities in case of natural disaster.

== Expeditions and documentary films ==
Some treks and films that showcase the Florida Wildlife Corridor:

- 2012: Everglades to Okefenokee follows the expedition of a group that traveled 1000 miles in 100 days through the Everglades to Okefenokee in early 2012. Throughout this trek, they document the importance of how connecting wildlife-dense areas is vital to conservation efforts and highlight those who are most important in making these linage areas possible.
- 2015: The Forgotten Coast documents a trek throughout the Everglades to the Seashore in 2015. The purpose of this film was to bring attention to threats to areas of corridors that are not protected, as well as press for the need for expansion for ecological importance.

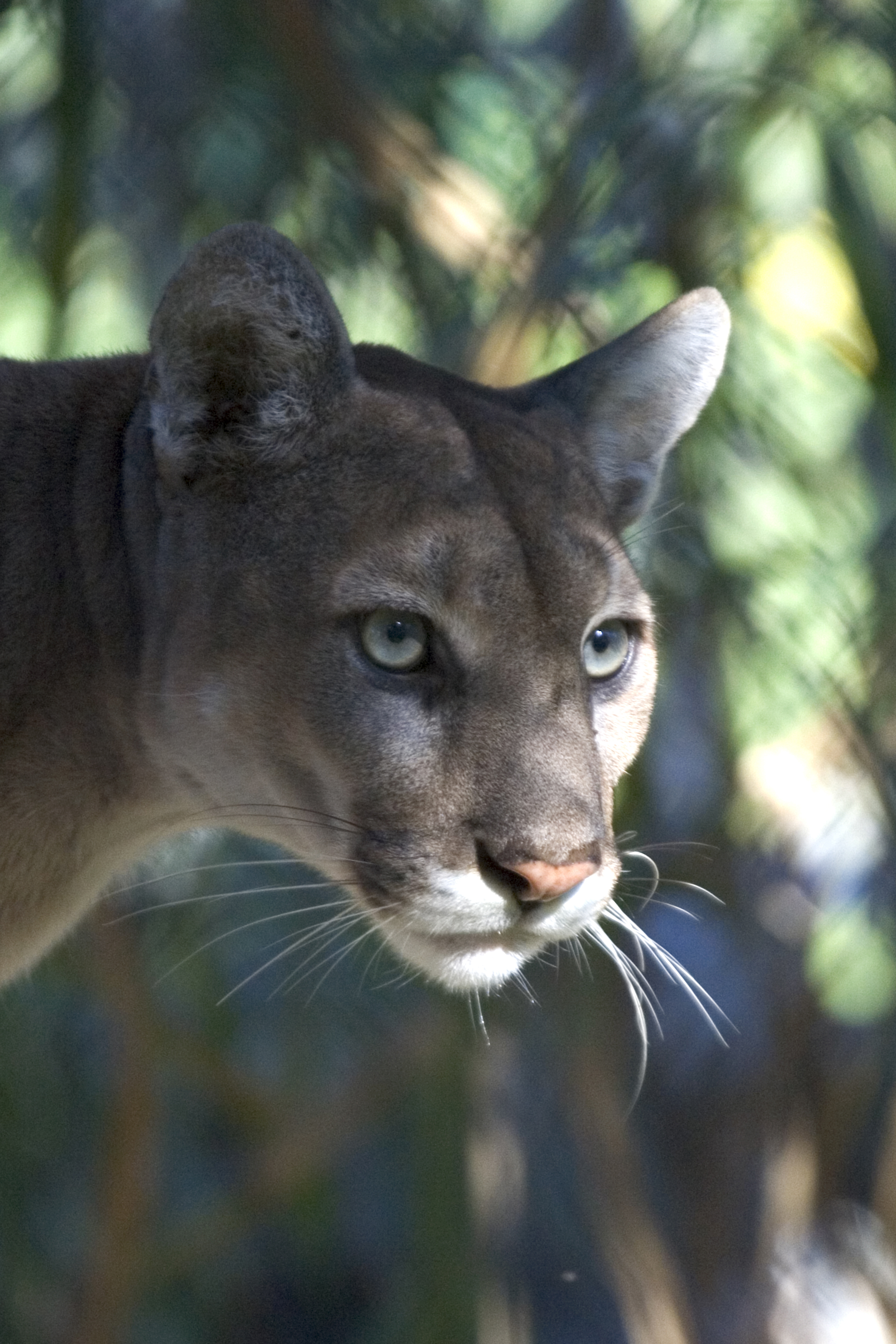
Close up of a Florida Panther

- 2018: The Last Green Thread: The expedition was through the Interstate 4 highway that goes through the Headwater to the Green Swamp. The call to action for this expedition was due to the increasing population of Florida. Because of the constant use of the highway, there is an increase in human-wildlife conflict. The team wanted to show that there needs to be a link between the headwaters and swaps to keep them from becoming isolated and protect the wildlife that inhabits them.
- 2019: The Wild Divide: Throughout this 7-day trek the team of conservations traveled from Highlands Hammock State Park to the Tiger Creek Preserve. The film was made in hopes it would be used as a tool to find better solutions to connect and restore wildlife throughout Florida.
- 2021: Home Waters: This trek was through Rainbow Springs to Homosassa Bay. Trekkers observed an unprotected area of the corridor and showed the possibilities that were opened to them by the 2021 passing of the Florida Wildlife Corridor Act. This documentary was produced by The Florida Wildlife Corridor Foundation.
- 2022: Path of the Panther: This documentary follows National Geographic photographer Carlton Ward Jr. as he documents the endangered Florida panther and highlights protecting the Florida Wildlife Corridor. Through high-definition camera traps, the film showcases the panther's habitat and played a role in raising awareness and influencing the passage of the Florida Wildlife Corridor Act.
- 2023: Protect Our Paradise: This six-part series examines how extreme population growth, climate change, and other factors are threatening Florida’s wildlife, water, and land. Each episode focuses on topics such as the Florida Wildlife Corridor, natural springs, agriculture, and water quality, emphasizing community involvement in environmental protection and preservation. The series was produced with funding and executive production support from Arnie Bellini, a Florida-based technology entrepreneur. It was created in partnership with Conservation Florida and in collaboration with Crawford Entertainment, reflecting Bellini’s interest in promoting a balance between economic development and environmental conservation in Florida.
