= Clyde Butcher =

American photographer

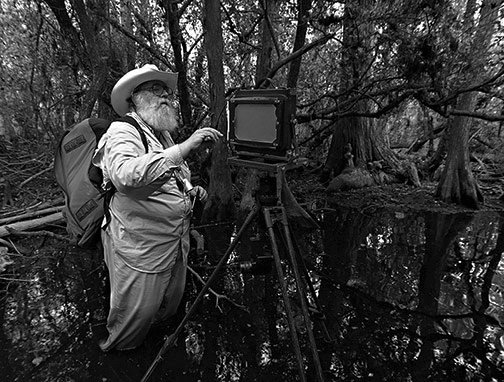
- Clyde Butcher
- Born: September 6, 1942 (age 83); Kansas City, Missouri
- Occupation: Black-and-white photographer
- Website: Gallery Homepage

Clyde Butcher (born September 6, 1942) is an American large-format camera photographer known for wilderness photography of the Florida landscape. He began his career doing color photography before switching to large-scale black-and-white landscape photography after the death of his son. Butcher is a strong advocate of conservation efforts and uses his work to promote awareness of the beauty of natural places.

== Background ==
Born in Kansas City, Missouri, Clyde Butcher led a nomadic childhood with his parents, until they settled in Southern California when he was 18. He attended California Polytechnic University in 1960 and graduated with a degree in architecture. While visiting Yosemite National Park in 1963, he learned about the photography studies of Ansel Adams.

In 1961 he began dating Niki Vogel. They married on June 15, 1963. He was 20. She was 18.

== Beginnings of photography career ==
During college, Butcher presented his architecture projects by creating and photographing miniature-scale models instead of making drawings.

After graduation, Butcher began a career in architecture. He worked with architect William Pereira on such buildings as the Transamerica building in San Francisco and worked for architectural model companies. With the downturn in the economy, Clyde lost his job and began showing his black and white images at local art festivals. He soon realized that he could make more money in photography than he was making in architecture. By 1970, he left architecture for landscape photography.

== Commercial success ==
Eventually, Butcher had a partnership that marketed and sold his images to the wall décor departments of Sears, Montgomery Ward, and J. C. Penney. He eventually accrued around 200 employees and offices in Akron, Ohio and Southern California. In order to increase sales, Butcher started photographing with color film so his images could match the avocado green shag carpets and gold couches. The bulk of his photography during this time took place west of the Rocky Mountains and in the Pacific Northwest.

To escape some of the stress of the business, he moved onto a sailboat with his wife where he lived for seven years, moored in the harbor of Newport Beach, California. The boat had no electricity or refrigeration, conditions were spartan. Living without a television on the boat gained the family a sense of peace and solitude while they could take advantage of the city.

== Move to Florida and Personal Life ==
Butcher's love for boating and the television program Flipper inspired him to explore Florida. Butcher sold his business in California, moved to Florida, and returned to selling art in street festivals.

In 1984, the Butchers attended an art festival in Winter Park and visited Tom Gaskin’s Cypress Knee Museum on U.S. Highway 27.

In 1986, the Butchers' son was killed by a drunk driver. Butcher retreated to the wilderness for solace and restoration. He put aside color photography and became a black-and-white landscape photographer using large-format cameras.

In 1993, Butcher purchased "Orchid Isle, a former orchid farm" consisting of 14 acres in Big Cypress National Preserve in Southern Florida which is surrounded by over a million acres of wilderness. This is where he built his gallery and home. He then realized that he needed to help the public to understand the beauty of the swamp and began leading guided tours through the swamp behind his gallery in Big Cypress National Preserve. Big Cypress Gallery is open seven days a week from 10:00 am to 5:00 pm.

In 1997, Butcher began creating very large images up to 5' x 9' and needed a larger darkroom. To accommodate his expanding practice, he purchased a building located in an industrial park in Venice, Florida. The building is home to his 2,000 square foot darkroom as well as a gallery. The darkroom is open to the public twice a year for tours. The gallery is open Tuesday through Friday, from 10:00 am to 4:30 pm.

== Conservation work ==
Butcher's deep appreciation for the Everglades inspired him to work for the restoration and preservation of the environment. He has received recognition for his community service as well as his photography. In 1992, PBS aired a documentary about him, Visions of Florida, which won a Wolfson Award.

Butcher and his work have also inspired other artist-conservationists, such as film producer Elam Stoltzfus, who was struck by Clyde's art. The pair have formed a friendship over the years and have collaborated on several multimedia projects together as a result. Butcher hosted the documentaries "Big Cypress Swamp: The Western Everglades" and "Kissimmee Basin: The Northern Everglades," sister films that highlighted the importance of conservation and art in the state of Florida.

Beyond photography, Butcher is an active environmentalist. He has been instrumental in raising awareness about the importance of preserving natural habitats, particularly the Florida Everglades. Through his galleries, exhibitions, and public speaking engagements, he advocates for conservation and educates the public on environmental issues. He has spoken out against the environmental destruction of the South Florida Detention Facility.

== Exhibitions ==
Clyde Butcher's photographs have been exhibited in many museums across the country including:

- Las Cruces Museum - Las Cruces, NM - Lifeworks in Photography - 2024
- Gadsden Museum of Art - Quincy, FL
- The Dali Museum - St. Petersburg, FL
- Museum of Fine Arts - St. Petersburg, FL
- James Museum - St. Petersburg, FL
- Fort Wayne Museum of Art - Fort Wayne, Indiana
- The Butler Institute of American Art - Youngstown, Ohio
- St. Petersburg Museum of History - St. Petersburg, FL
- Museum of Florida History - Tallahassee, FL
- Pensacola Museum of Art - Pensacola, FL
- The Bishop Museum of Science and Nature - Bradenton, FL
- Museum of the Rockies - Bozeman, MT
- Midwest Museum of American Art - Elkhart, Indiana
- Museum of Discovery and Science - Ft. Lauderdale, FL
- Annenberg Space for Photography - Los Angeles, CA
- Orlando Museum of Art - Orlando, FL
- Naples Museum of Art - Naples, FL
- Boca Raton Museum of Art - Boca Raton, Florida
- Fernbank Museum of Natural History - Atlanta, GA
- Muscarelle Museum of Art, - Williamsburg, VA
- Museum of Contemporary Art Jacksonville - Jacksonville, FL
- Dubuque Museum of Art - Dubuque, IA
- Bergstorm-Mahler Museum - Neenah, WI
- Ringling Museum of Art (in conjunction with Ansel Adams) - Sarasota, FL
- Lowe Art Museum -Miami, Florida
- Appleton Museum - Ocala, FL
- Museum of Art Fort Lauderdale - Ft. Lauderdale, FL

International Exhibitions

- National Gallery of Art - Prague, Czech Republic
- Gallery of Classic Photography (group exhibit) - Moscow, Russia

== Books and publications ==
- Clyde Butcher, Portfolio I: Florida Landscapes (1994, Shade Tree Press; ISBN 978-0-9638703-2-2)
- Clyde Butcher: Nature's Places of Spiritual Sanctuary Photographs from 1961 to 1999 (1999, University Press of Florida; ISBN 978-0-9675842-2-5)
- Living Waters: Aquatic Preserves Of Florida (2004, University Press of Florida; ISBN 978-0-8130-2801-9)
- Clyde Butcher Florida Landscape (2005, University Press of Florida; ISBN 978-0-8130-2825-5)
- Clyde Butcher Apalachicola River, An American Treasure (2006, Italy; ISBN 0-8130-3016-1)
- Clyde Butcher America the Beautiful 1st edition (2007)
- Clyde Butcher Visions of Dali Spain (2018, Italy; ISBN 978-09998448-0-9)
- Clyde Butcher Cuba The Natural Beauty 2nd edition (2019, Italy; ISBN 978-0-578-52123-7)
- Clyde Butcher The Everglades (2020, EBS; ISBN 978-0-578-63869-0)
- Clyde Butcher National Parks (2021, Printed in Singapore; ISBN 978-0-9675842-5-6)
- Clyde Butcher Lifeworks in Photography (2024, Printed in Singapore; ISBN 978-0-9675842-6-3)

== Legacy and awards ==
=== Photography ===
- 1998, Florida Artist Hall of Fame Award
- 2000, Ansel Adams Award from the Sierra Club
- 2003, Florida Monthly Magazine – Best Florida Gallery
- 2005, North American Nature Photography Association Lifetime Achievement Award 2005
- 2006, Best Florida Artist, Florida Magazine Best of Florida 2006
- 2007, Florida International Magazine – Power Player Award
- 2008, Florida Trend Sustainable Florida– Legacy Award
- 2008, Estuary Guardian of the Year Award - Estuary Conservation Association
- 2011, Florida House Embassy Washington, DC –Distinguished Artist Award
- 2015, Florida Lake Management Society (FLMS) The Scott Driver Award
- 2014, Visit Sarasota County’s Voice of Sarasota Award
- 2017, IPA (International Photography Awards), Celebrating America’s National Parks Book, Professional Book, 1st place
- 2017, Sanibel-Captiva Conservation Foundation “Ding” Darling Brush of Excellence Environmental Art Program
- 2019, Photographic Society of America, International Understanding Through Photography Award
- 2019, Leadership Florida®, LeRoy Collins Lifetime Achievement Award
- 2020, The South Florida National Parks Trust – Lifetime Achievement Award
- 2020, Friends of the Rookery Bay - Lavern Norris Gaynor Environmental Champion Award
- 2020, Black & White Magazine, Special Issue Photo Contest Winners, Ghost Orchid Dancing & Whilden’s Pond
- 2022, National Medal of Arts

=== Community service ===
- 1996, Heartland Community Service Award
- 1997, Everglades Coalition Award
- 1997, "Person of the Week", presented by Peter Jennings on ABC News)
- 1997, American Planning Association - Florida Chapter Service Award
- 1998, South Eastern Region Nature Conservancy Conservation Colleague Award
- 1999, Keeping Florida Beautiful - Adopt-A-Highway Public Service Award
- 2004, Wolfsom Telly Award
- 2004, Top 100 Most Influential People in Florida
- 2005, Florida International University Humanitarian of the Year Award
- 2006, Conservancy Eagle Award - Conservancy of South West Florida
- 2008, Estuary Guardian of the Year Award - Estuary Conservation Association
- 2008, Stars Arts Award - Paradise Coast
- 2010, Crystal Vision Award - League of Environmental Educators of Florida
- 2011, Gulf Shore Life Magazine - Man of the Year
- 2012, Biff Lampton Conservation Communicator of the Year Award - Florida Wildlife Federation
- 2013, Voice of the Arts Award - Naples International Film Festival
- 2016, Brush of Excellence Award - Sanibel Captiva Conservation Foundation
- 2018, Theodore Roosevelt Award - Audubon Florida
