= Big Cypress National Preserve =

Protected area in Florida, United States

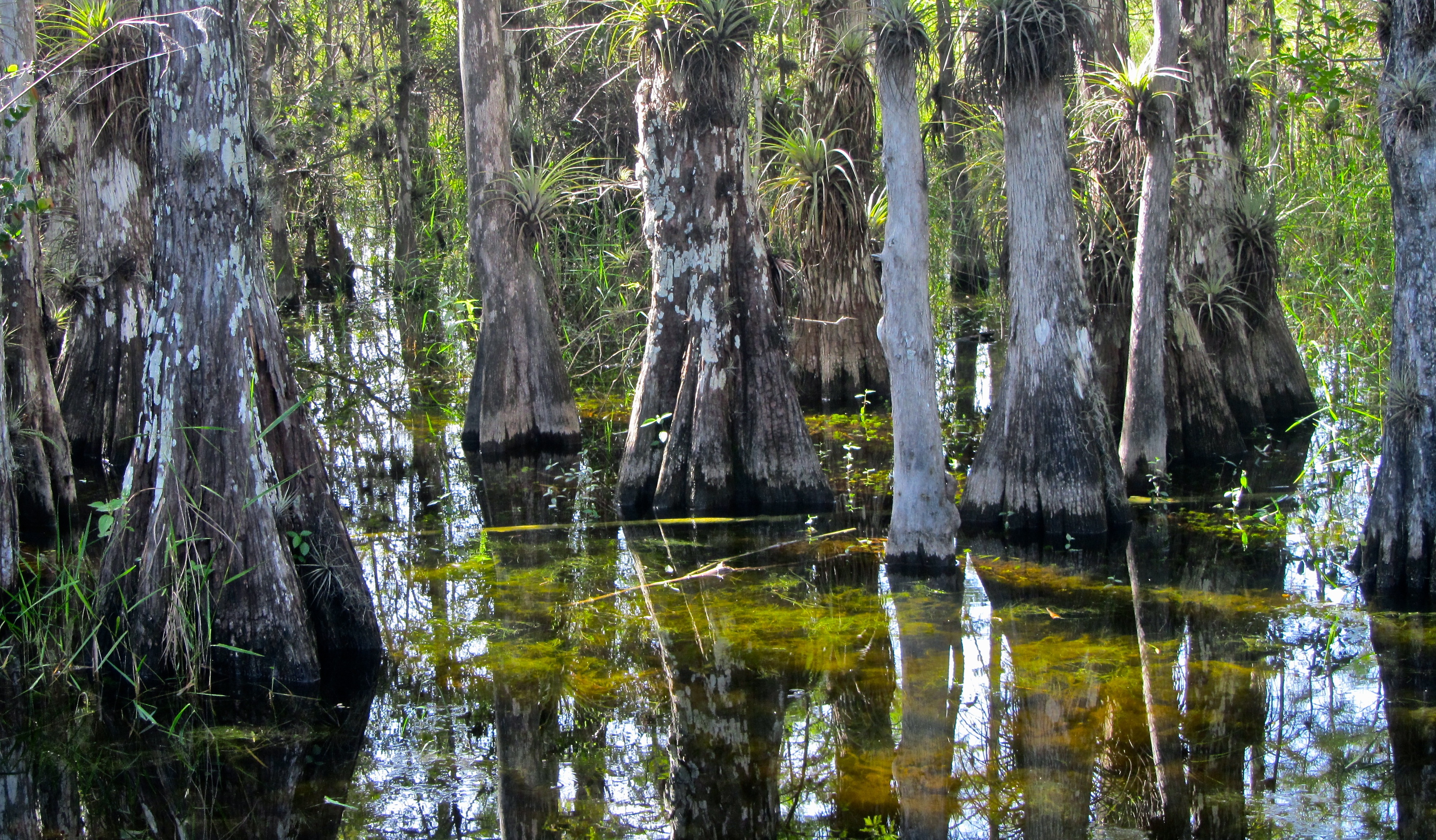

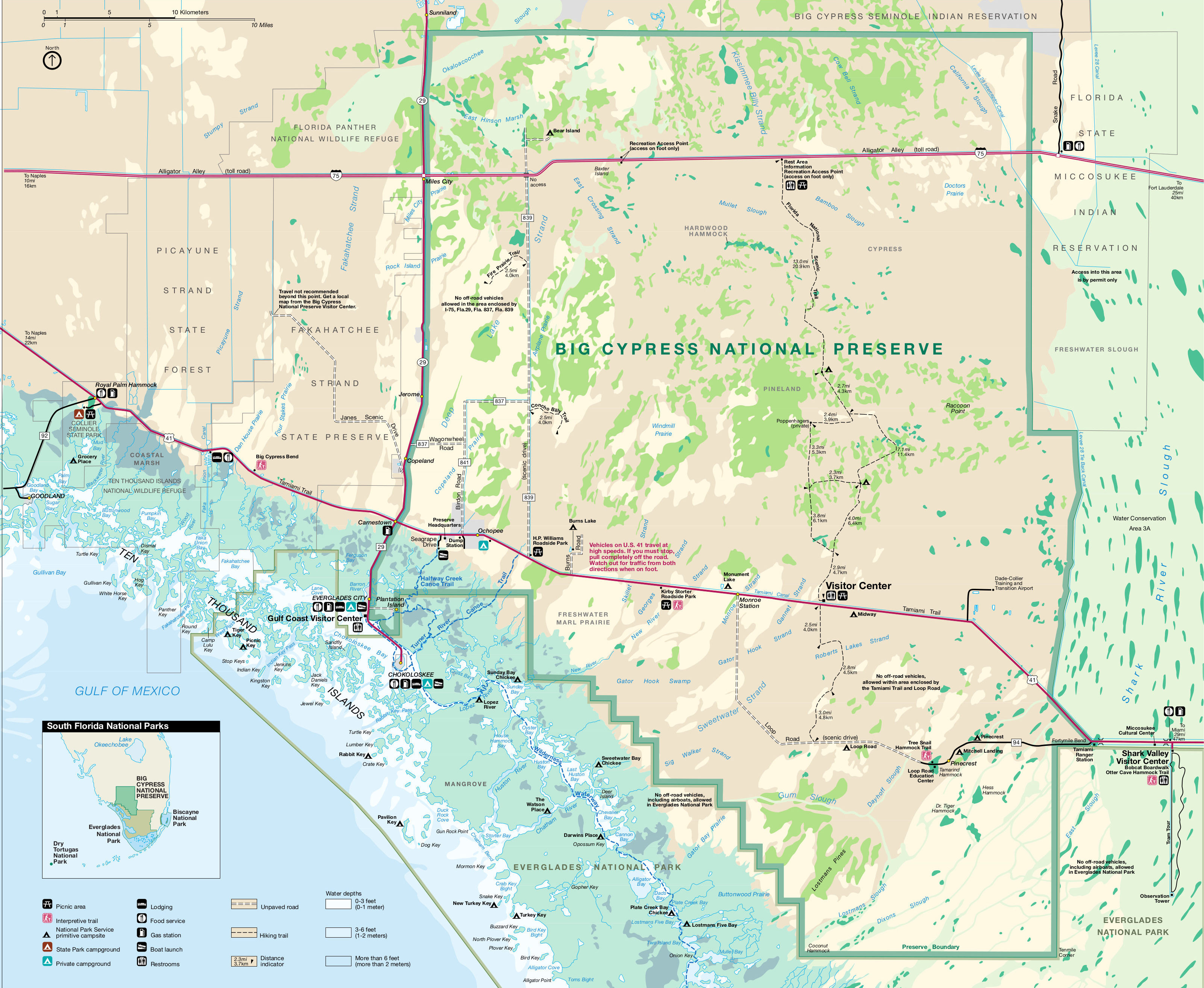
- Map of the preserve
- Location: Collier, Monroe, & Miami-Dade counties, Florida, United States
- Nearest city: Everglades City, Florida
- Coordinates: 25°51′32″N 81°02′02″W
- Area: 720,566 acres (2,916.03 km^{2})
- Established: October 11, 1974
- Visitors: 2,903,159 (in 2022)
- Governing body: National Park Service
- Website: Big Cypress National Preserve
- Big Cypress National Preserve (Florida) Big Cypress National Preserve (the United States)

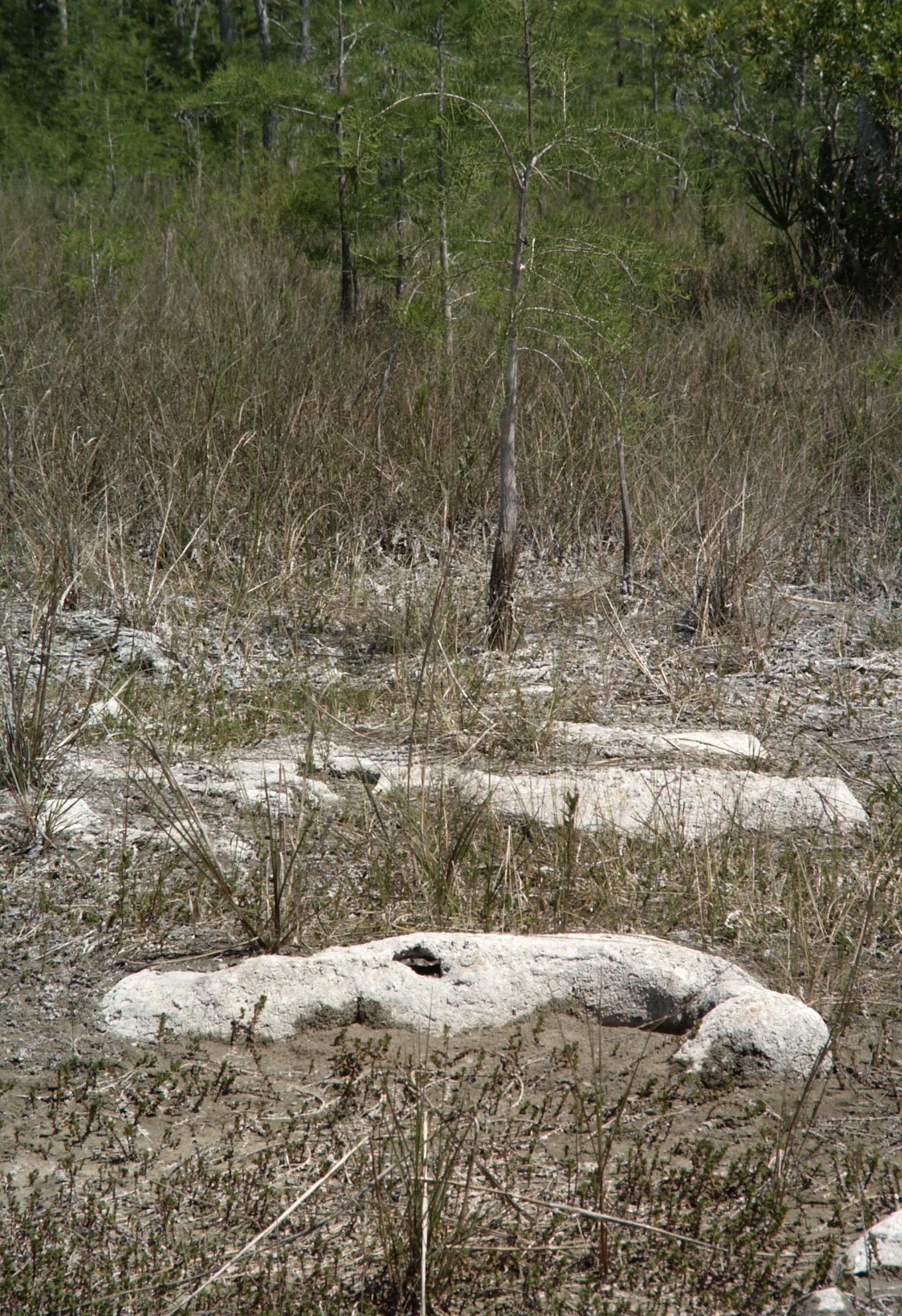
Rock outcroppings in the prairie north of Concho Billy Trail

Big Cypress National Preserve is a United States national preserve located in South Florida, about 45 miles (72 km) west of Miami on the Atlantic coastal plain. The 720,000-acre (2,900 km^{2}) Big Cypress, along with Big Thicket National Preserve in Texas, became the first national preserves in the United States National Park System when they were established on October 11, 1974. Florida film producer Elam Stoltzfus has featured the preserve and its photographers Niki and Clyde Butcher in several PBS and other documentaries, beginning with the half-hour "Visions of Florida: the Photographic Art of Clyde Butcher" produced in 1990.

Big Cypress borders the wet freshwater marl prairies of Everglades National Park to the south, and other state and federally protected cypress country in the west, with water from the Big Cypress flowing south and west into the coastal Ten Thousand Islands region of Everglades National Park.

== History ==
Archaeology at Platt Island in the preserve shows humans settled there more than two thousand years ago. The Calusa people had an extensive presence in the area when Europeans arrived. Big Cypress was historically occupied by various cultures of Native Americans; the last were the Seminole of the nineteenth century. Their descendants include the federally recognized Miccosukee Tribe of Indians of Florida and the Seminole Tribe of Florida.

Early European-American settlers hunted herons and egrets, whose feathers were popular with 19th and 20th century hat-makers in New York and Paris. Poachers hunted American alligators and American crocodiles to near extinction. When the timber industry began to operate in the area, it built railroads, and cut and hauled out most of the cypress ecosystem's old growth trees.

An area of approximately 1,400 acres (570 ha) along and west of State Road 29 in the western part of the Big Cypress, now known as the Green Heart of the Everglades, was commercially farmed for winter vegetables from the late 1920s until the 1960s.

The search for oil in Florida began in 1901 with no success. After almost 80 dry holes had been drilled throughout the state, on September 26, 1943, Humble Oil Company (at the time partly owned by and later merged into Standard Oil of New Jersey) discovered Florida's first producing oil well in the northwest portion of what is now Big Cypress National Preserve. When Everglades National Park was established in 1947, Big Cypress was originally intended to be included; however, because the land had not been purchased from its private owners, Big Cypress was ultimately released from the park system.

In the 1960s, the site was proposed to become the Miami Jetport, a massive new airport intended to replace Miami International Airport. Construction began in 1968, but due to efforts of Native Americans, hunters, and conservationists, construction was halted in 1970 after only one of the proposed six runways was completed. They followed up with a campaign to have Big Cypress included in the National Park System. The single completed runway is now known as the Dade-Collier Training and Transition Airport; in 2025, it became the site of Alligator Alcatraz, a rapid-build immigration detention facility.

Big Cypress National Preserve differs from Everglades National Park in that, when it was established by law in 1974, the Miccosukee, Seminole and Traditional people were provided with permanent rights to occupy and use the land in traditional ways; in addition, they have first rights to develop income-producing businesses related to the resources and use of the preserve, such as guided tours. They and other hunters may use off-road vehicles, and home and business owners have been permitted to keep their properties in the preserve. As in Everglades National Park, petroleum exploration was permitted within Big Cypress in the authorizing legislation, but plans are under way for the government to buy out the remaining petroleum leases in order to shut down non-governmental commercial access to the environment.

In 2016, Big Cypress National Preserve became the first national preserve to be designated as a Dark Sky Park by DarkSky International park in 2016.

== Climate ==
Big Cypress has a tropical monsoon climate (Am according to Köppen climate classification), bordering on tropical savanna climate (Aw). Days are some of the hottest in Florida. January has an average high of 78.0 °F (25.6 °C) and August has an average high of 93.6 °F (34.2 °C). However, nights cool down into the 50s °F (low 10s °C) in winter. Means range from 66.5 °F (19.2 °C) in January to 84.7 °F (29.3 °C) in August. Highs exceed 90 °F (32 °C) on 154 days per year, while they fall below 70 °F (21 °C) on just 8 days. Hardiness zone is 10b, with an average annual minimum of 35 °F (2 °C). The lowest recorded daily high was 48 °F (9 °C) in 2010, while the highest low on record was 89 °F (32 °C) in 2005.

Climate data for Oasis Ranger Station, Florida, 1991–2020 normals, extremes 1978–2016
Month	Jan	Feb	Mar	Apr	May	Jun	Jul	Aug	Sep	Oct	Nov	Dec	Year
Record high °F (°C)	90 (32)	91 (33)	94 (34)	97 (36)	100 (38)	103 (39)	101 (38)	101 (38)	101 (38)	98 (37)	96 (36)	91 (33)	103 (39)
Mean maximum °F (°C)	86.4 (30.2)	87.6 (30.9)	89.8 (32.1)	92.1 (33.4)	96.4 (35.8)	97.6 (36.4)	97.6 (36.4)	98.0 (36.7)	96.9 (36.1)	93.9 (34.4)	90.1 (32.3)	87.1 (30.6)	98.8 (37.1)
Mean daily maximum °F (°C)	78.0 (25.6)	80.7 (27.1)	83.0 (28.3)	87.0 (30.6)	90.5 (32.5)	92.3 (33.5)	93.4 (34.1)	93.6 (34.2)	92.2 (33.4)	88.6 (31.4)	83.5 (28.6)	80.1 (26.7)	86.9 (30.5)
Daily mean °F (°C)	66.5 (19.2)	68.8 (20.4)	70.6 (21.4)	74.4 (23.6)	78.2 (25.7)	82.4 (28.0)	84.3 (29.1)	84.7 (29.3)	83.9 (28.8)	79.9 (26.6)	73.6 (23.1)	69.6 (20.9)	76.4 (24.7)
Mean daily minimum °F (°C)	55.1 (12.8)	57.0 (13.9)	58.2 (14.6)	61.7 (16.5)	65.9 (18.8)	72.5 (22.5)	75.1 (23.9)	75.8 (24.3)	75.7 (24.3)	71.2 (21.8)	63.8 (17.7)	59.0 (15.0)	65.9 (18.8)
Mean minimum °F (°C)	36.1 (2.3)	38.8 (3.8)	43.4 (6.3)	48.1 (8.9)	56.4 (13.6)	65.8 (18.8)	69.9 (21.1)	71.3 (21.8)	70.7 (21.5)	60.0 (15.6)	50.2 (10.1)	41.1 (5.1)	33.6 (0.9)
Record low °F (°C)	26 (−3)	26 (−3)	32 (0)	41 (5)	50 (10)	57 (14)	62 (17)	62 (17)	63 (17)	48 (9)	39 (4)	26 (−3)	26 (−3)
Average precipitation inches (mm)	1.92 (49)	1.56 (40)	2.10 (53)	3.02 (77)	5.77 (147)	10.45 (265)	9.13 (232)	9.66 (245)	8.09 (205)	5.16 (131)	1.88 (48)	1.63 (41)	60.37 (1,533)
Average precipitation days (≥ 0.01 in)	7.0	5.6	5.8	6.1	9.0	18.0	17.6	19.9	17.8	11.3	5.5	6.0	129.6
Source: NOAA (mean maxima/minima 1981–2010)

== Flora and fauna ==
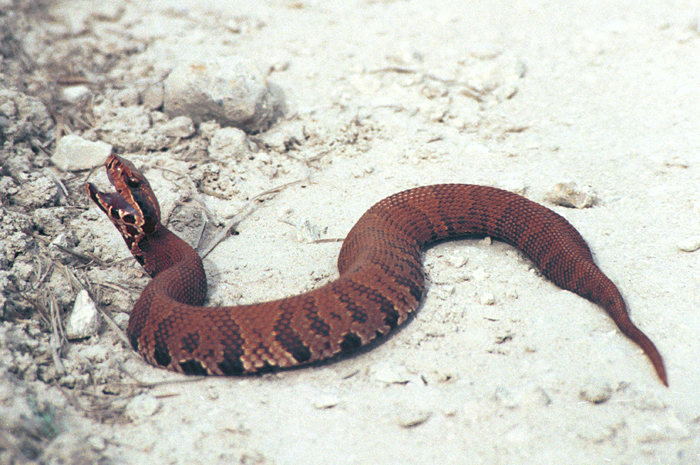
A cottonmouth crosses an off-road vehicle access road in Big Cypress National Preserve.

The preserve is biologically highly diverse. It is dominated by a wet cypress forest, but while "few giant cypress remain...one third of the swamp is covered with dwarf pond cypress." It is host to an array of flora and fauna, including mangroves, orchids, alligators, crocodiles, venomous snakes like the cottonmouth and eastern diamondback rattlesnake, a variety of birds, river otter, deer, bobcat, coyote, black bear and cougar.

The preserve is also home to federally listed endangered species including the eastern indigo snake and the Florida sandhill crane.

== Tourism ==
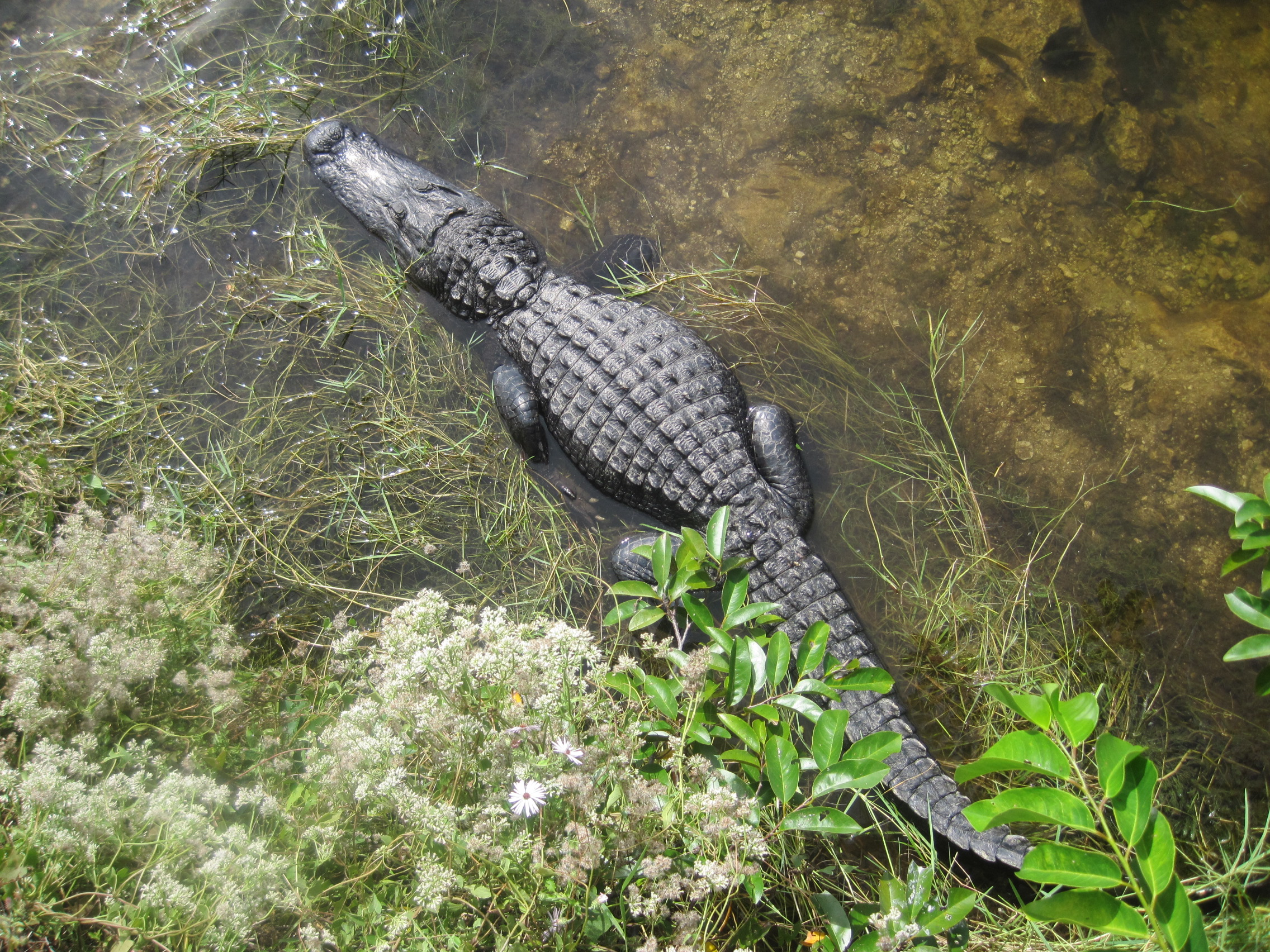
American alligator sunning below the boardwalk at the Oasis Visitor Center

Twelve campgrounds in Big Cypress are tailored to motor vehicles, where tourists planning overnight stays can park their vehicles and off-road vehicles in designated areas. The southern terminus of the Florida National Scenic Trail is located in Big Cypress, and provides hiking opportunities during the winter months. Hiking throughout Big Cypress is enjoyable in all seasons, with most of the cypress country more hospitable to hikers than the dense sawgrass prairies of the central Everglades. Some of the most beautiful wading and walking can be found in cypress strands and prairies between the Loop Road and the Tamiami Trail.

Wildlife is abundant in the preserve. Most notable and regularly seen, the American alligators can be up to around 12 feet (4 m) in length. Another notable and endangered animal, the Florida panther calls the Preserve home. Though both generally relatively timid, wading through the cypress country requires constant alertness. Before going out, visit one of the preserve's visitor centers for information on the current conditions and local trails. The visitor centers offer an educational video about the surroundings, also viewable on the Big Cypress YouTube channel. Rangers often lead swamp walk hikes in the dry winter months, as well as canoe trips, and boardwalk talks.

Hunting is a long-established recreational activity in the area and is protected in the designation of the area as a Preserve. Hunters were instrumental in protecting this corner of remote, wild Florida. Hunting activities continue today and include seasons for archery, muzzle loading and general gun. Typical game species are white-tailed deer, turkey and hogs. Alligator hunting is not allowed within the national preserve. Hunting within the preserve is managed cooperatively between the National Park Service and the Florida Fish and Wildlife Conservation Commission.

== Controversy over off-road vehicles ==
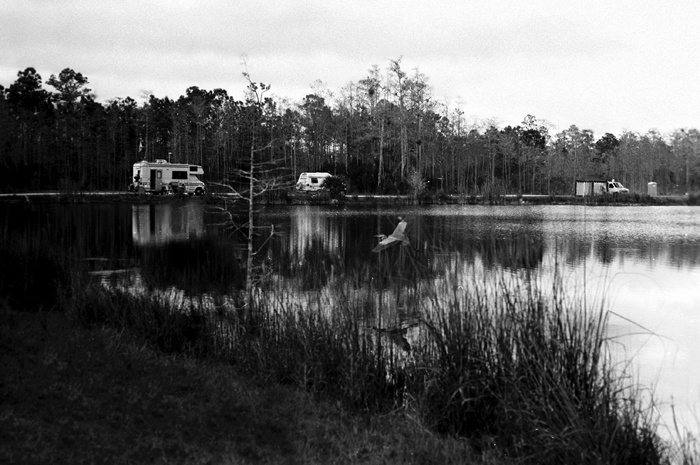
Burns Lake campground, one of Big Cypress's many seasonal camps designed mainly for R.V.s and ORVs

Touted as a "recreational paradise" by the Department of the Interior, Big Cypress was created in part to accommodate access with off-road vehicles (ORVs) by the hunters and the Miccosukee and Seminole people who had worked to protect Big Cypress from drainage and development. However, scientists and conservationists have noted an increase in ORV recreation that prompted the National Park Service in 2001 to proactively manage ORV recreation and to reduce 400 miles (640 km) of primary trails within the preserve, despite persistent calls for more from hunters and ORV enthusiasts.

According to a 2001 study conducted by the United States Geological Survey,

ORV use in Big Cypress National Preserve has impacted wildlife populations and habitats through modifications to water flow patterns (direction and velocity) and water quality, soil displacement and compaction, direct vegetation damage, disturbance to foraging individuals, and, ultimately, overall suitability of habitats for wildlife.

Given these conclusions, environmental groups opposed the announcement by park officials in 2006 of a new study to determine whether the recreational benefit of more trails is worth the risk of additional damage to the ecosystem.

== Controversy over "emergency" detention center ==
In June 2025, Florida declared a state of emergency to seize the county-owned Dade-Collier Training and Transition Airport within Big Cypress National Preserve and fast-track construction of a detention camp without standard environmental reviews or coordination with local officials.

On June 27, a coalition led by Friends of the Everglades, the Center for Biological Diversity, and the Miccosukee Tribe of Indians filed suit in federal court seeking to halt the project pending a full environmental review and public comment period. The plaintiffs argued the project threatened endangered species habitat, including the Florida panther and Florida bonneted bat, and violated the National Environmental Policy Act and tribal cultural-resource protections.

At an August 7 hearing, witnesses testified that approximately 20 acres (8 hectares) had been paved and that temporary tents, trailers, and heavy equipment were already on site.

By August 29, the state had incurred an estimated $218 million in sunk construction costs. Opponents also raised concerns about potential water, traffic, and light pollution from camp infrastructure and sewage systems.

On August 21, U.S. District Judge Kathleen Williams ordered removal of temporary fencing, lighting, generators, sewage, and waste receptacles within 60 days. The U.S. Court of Appeals for the 11th Circuit later stayed the injunction in a 2–1 ruling pending appeal.

== Gallery ==
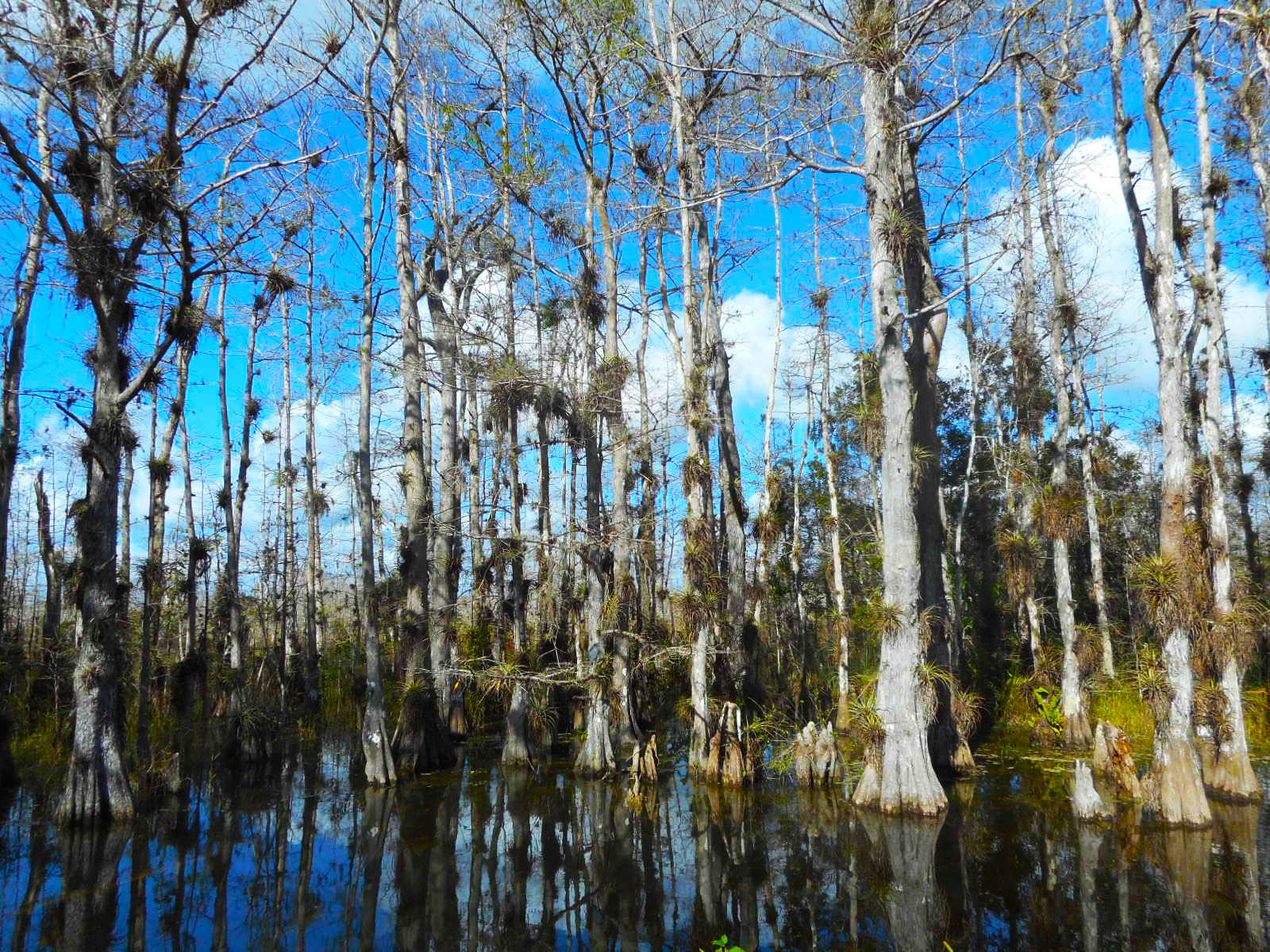
Cypresses growing along SR 94 (Loop Road)

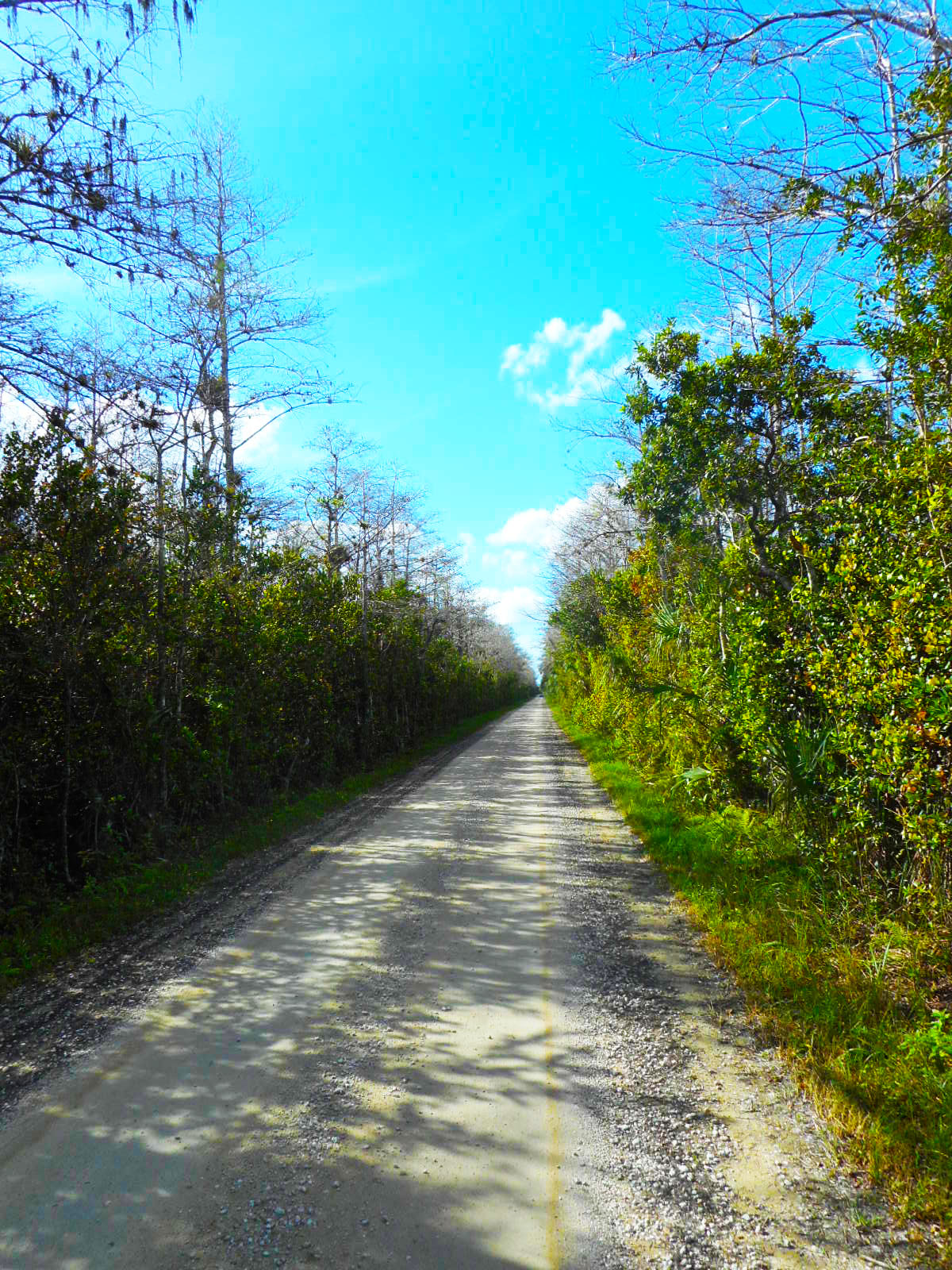
State Road 94 (Loop Road) in Big Cypress

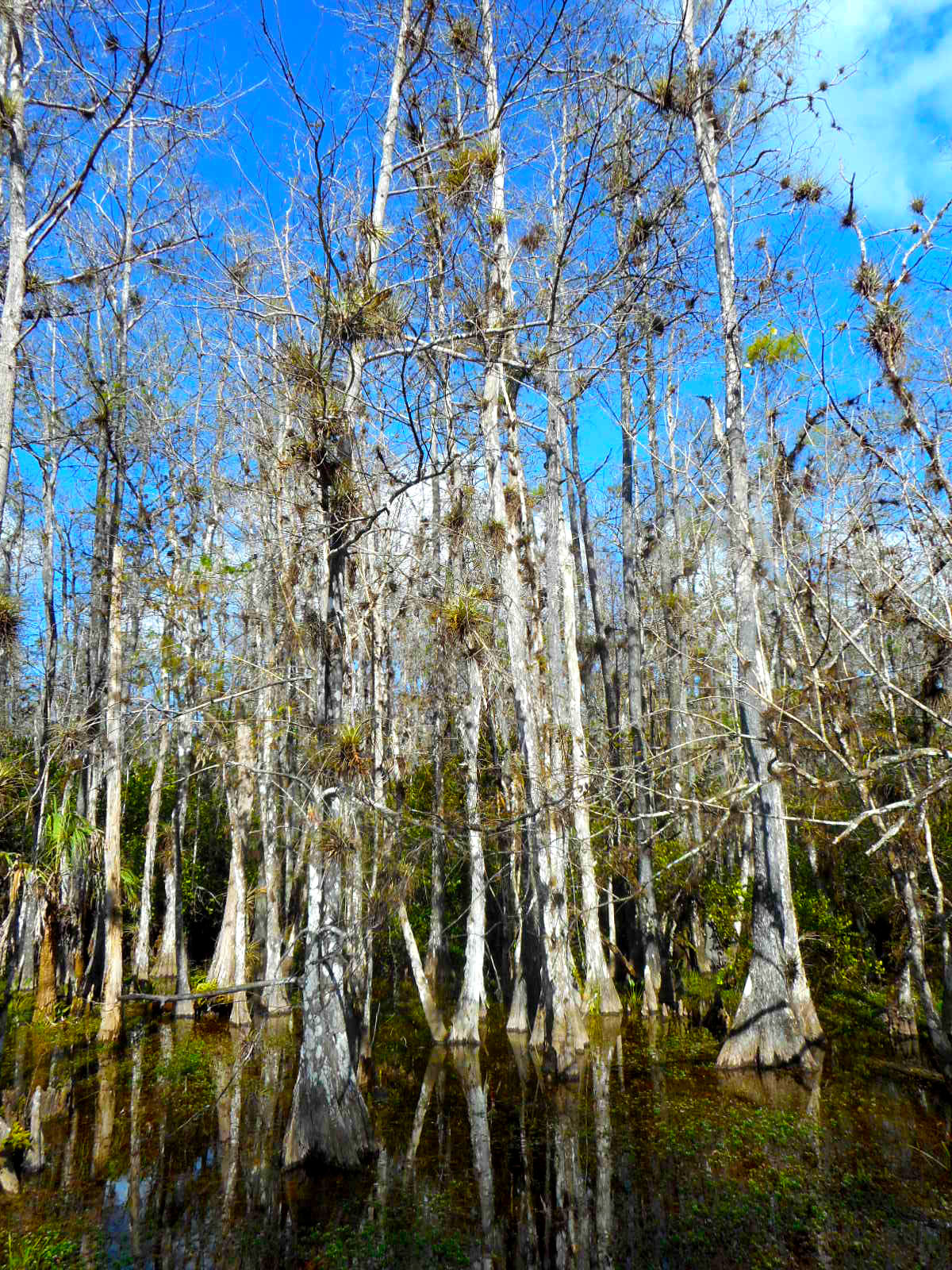
Cypresses growing along Loop Road SR 94

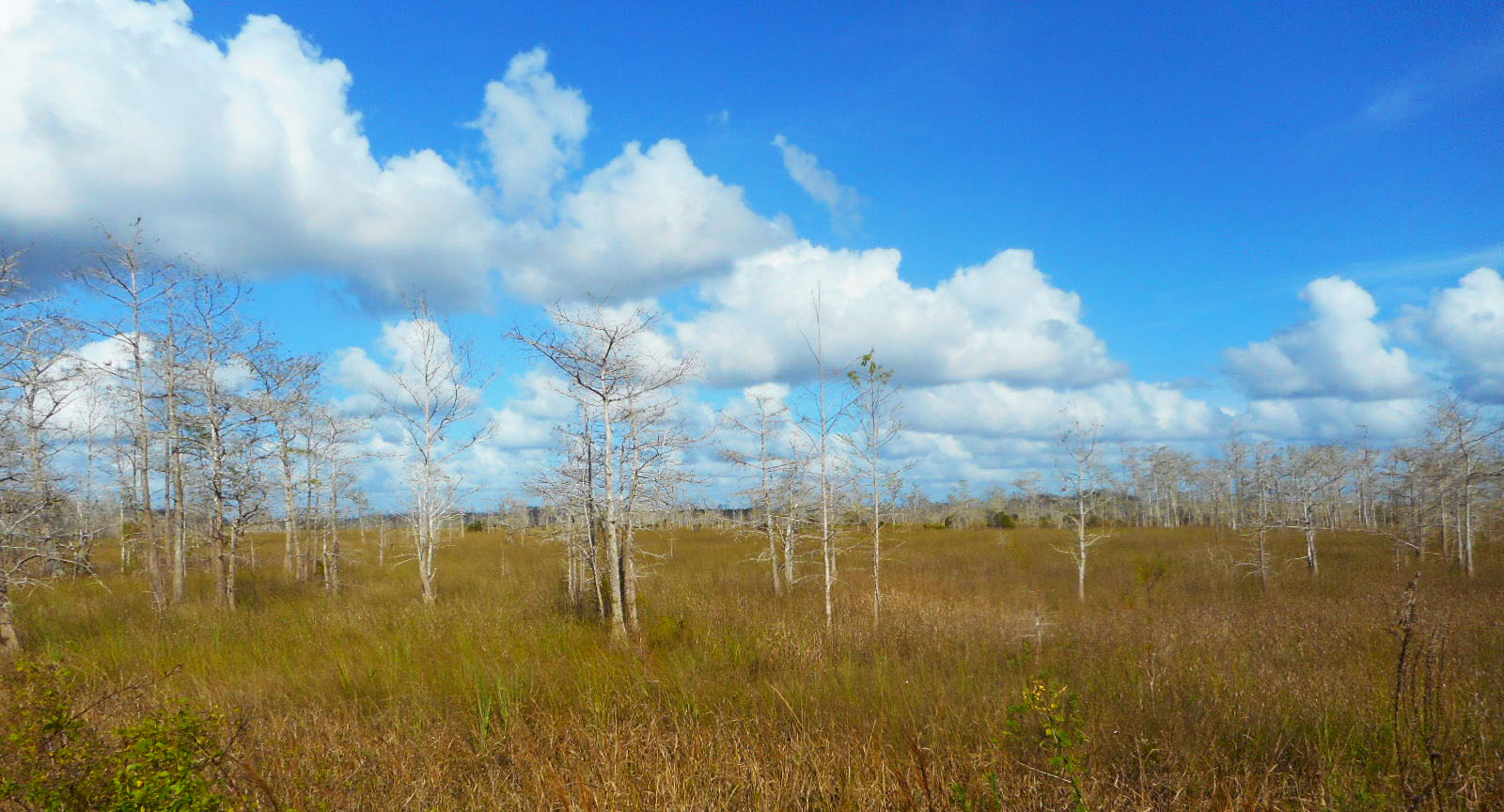
Prairie in Big Cypress N. P.

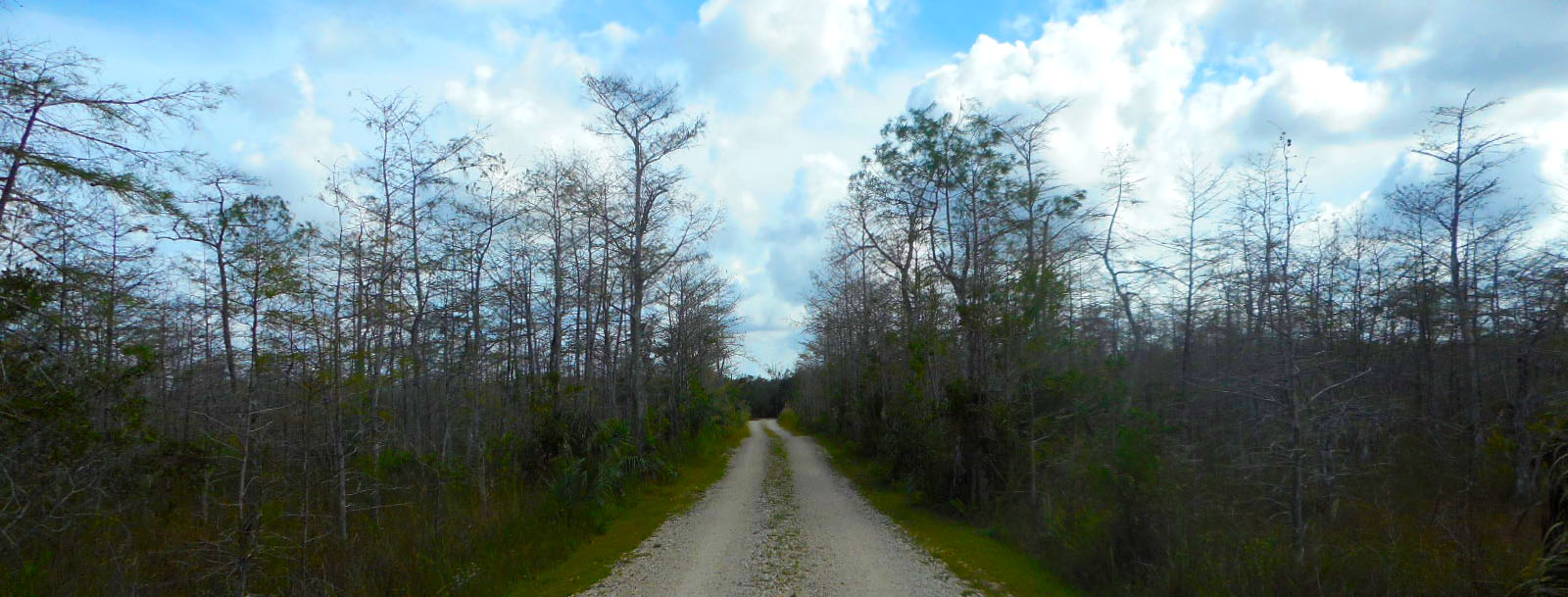

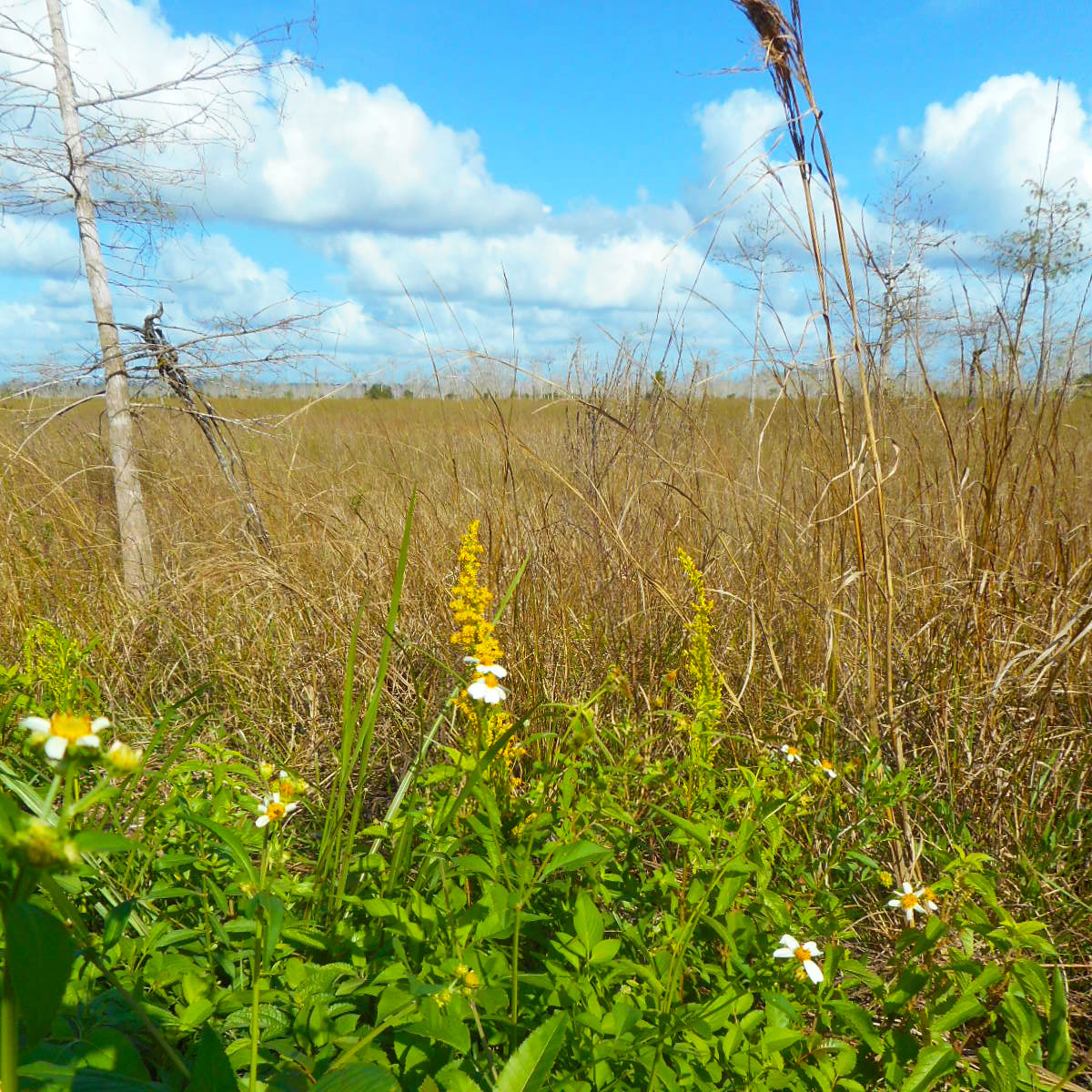
Prairie in Big Cypress N. P.

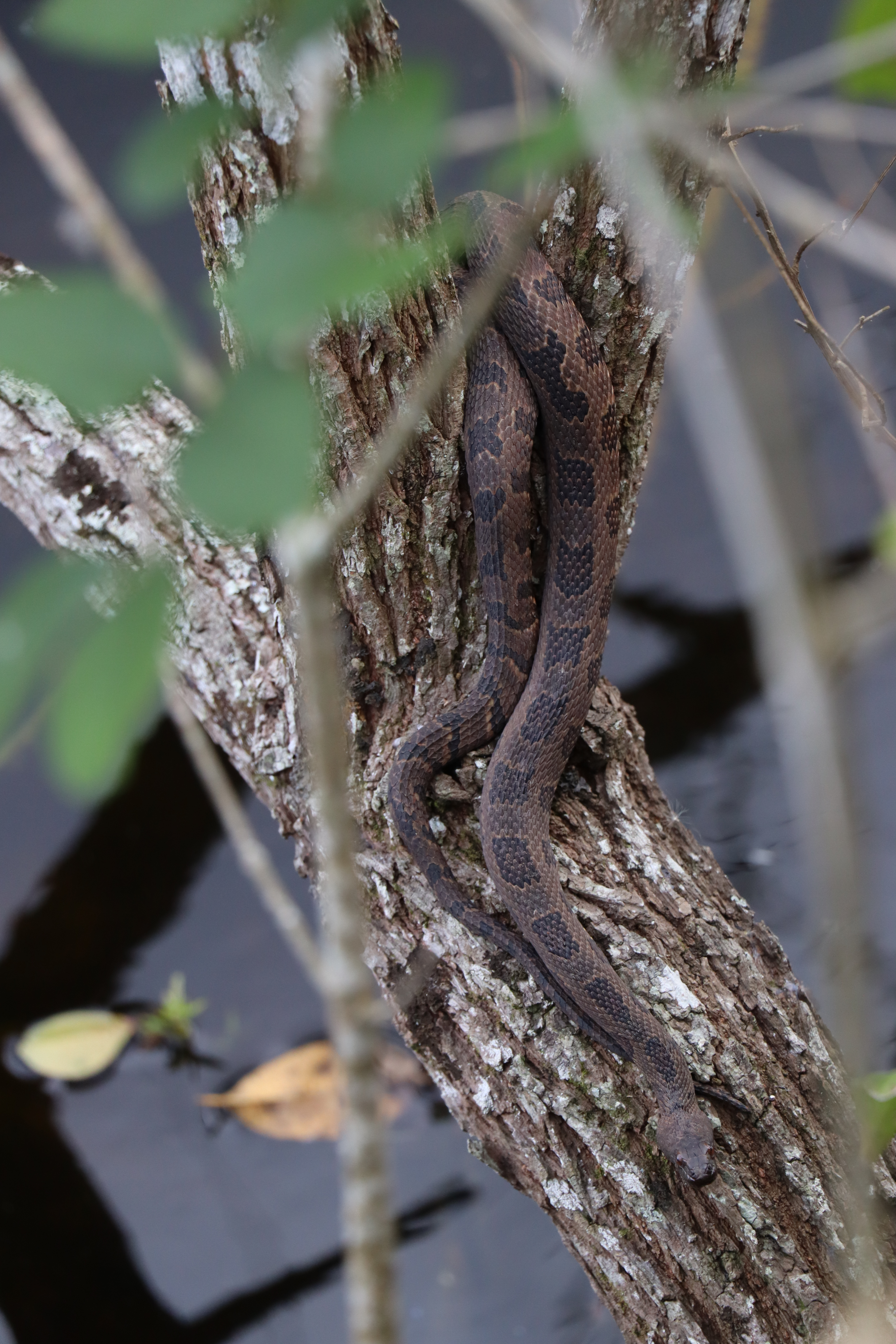
A brown water snake rests on a branch above the water.

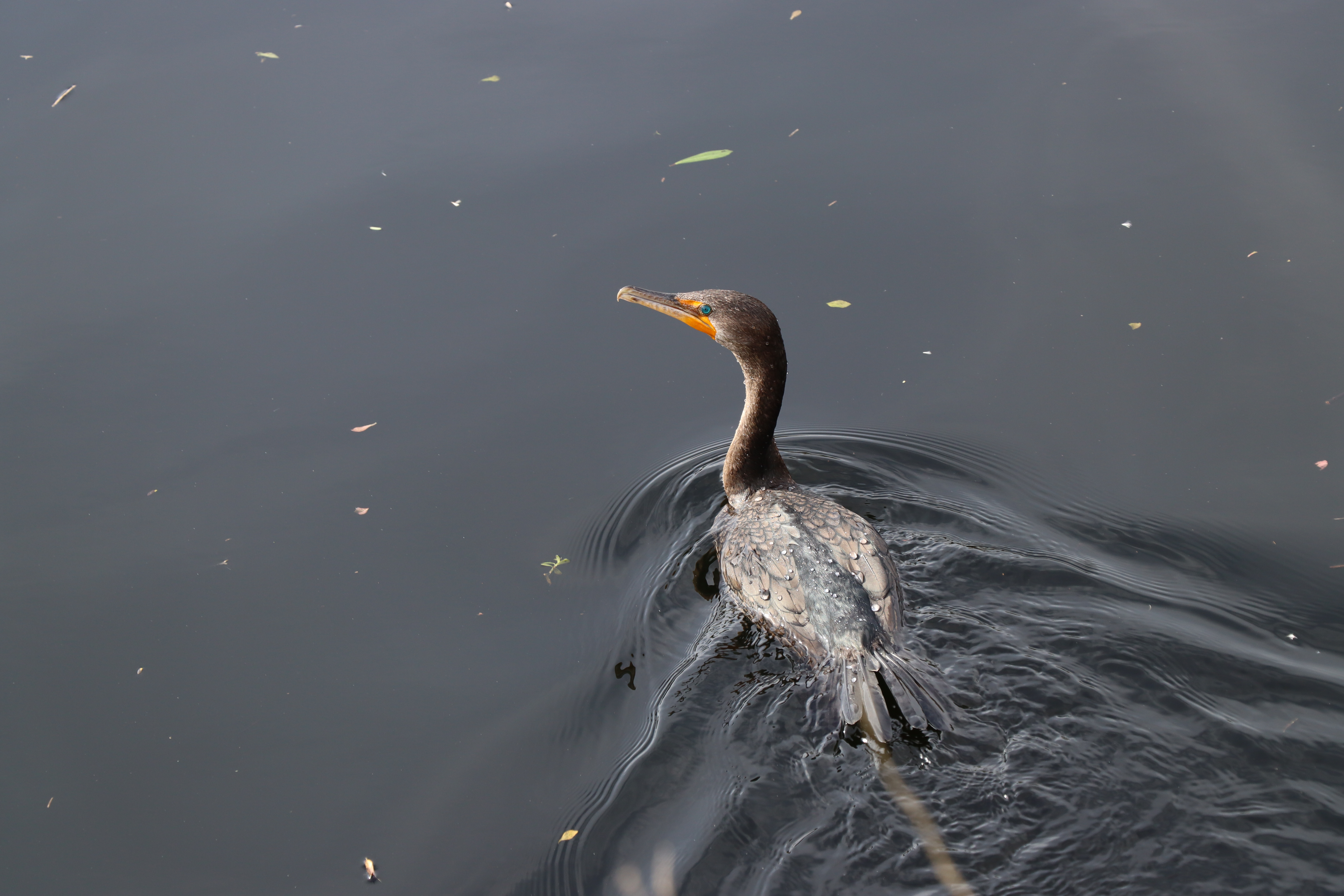
Double-crested cormorant cruises through the water.

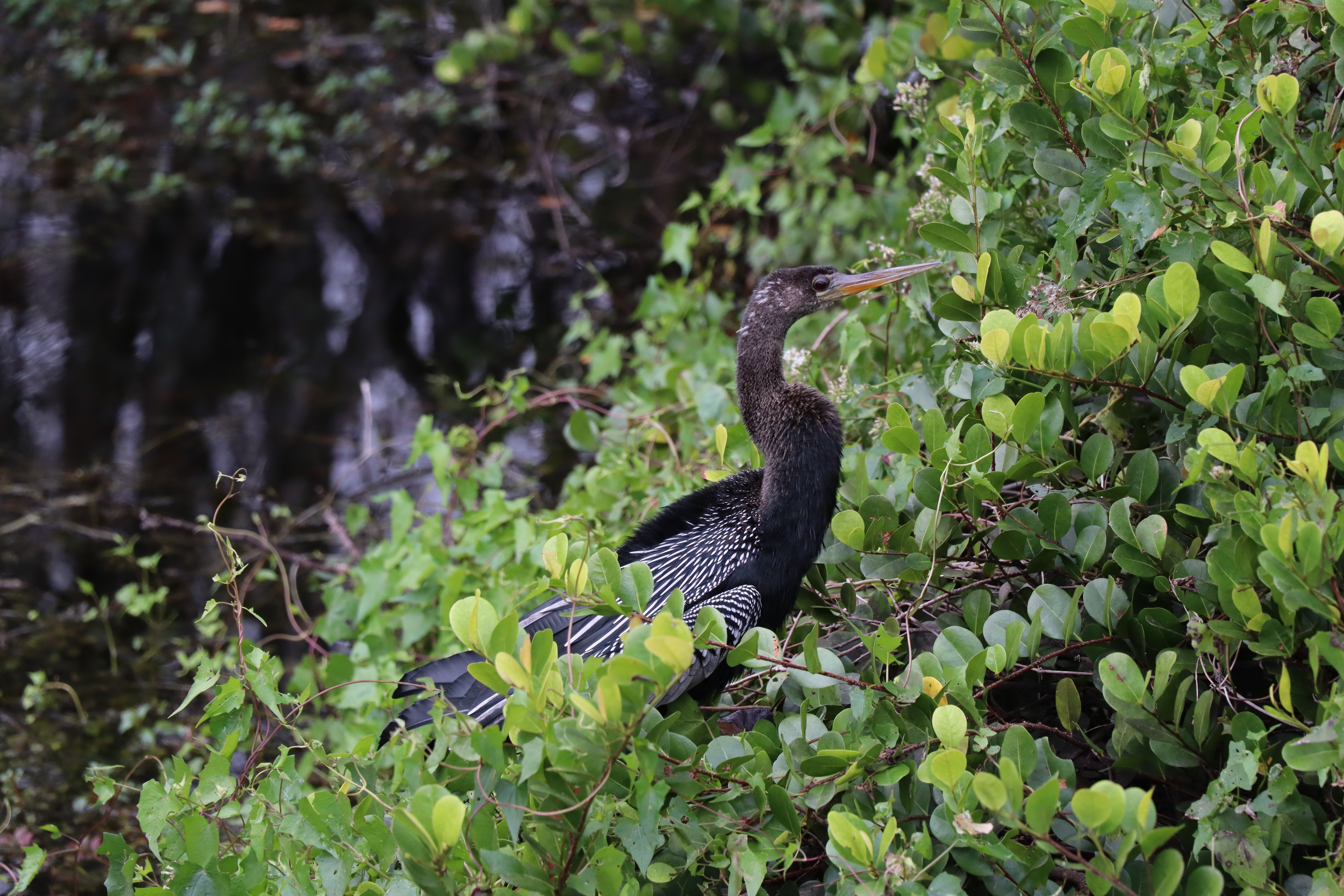
An anhinga perches among the branches above the water.

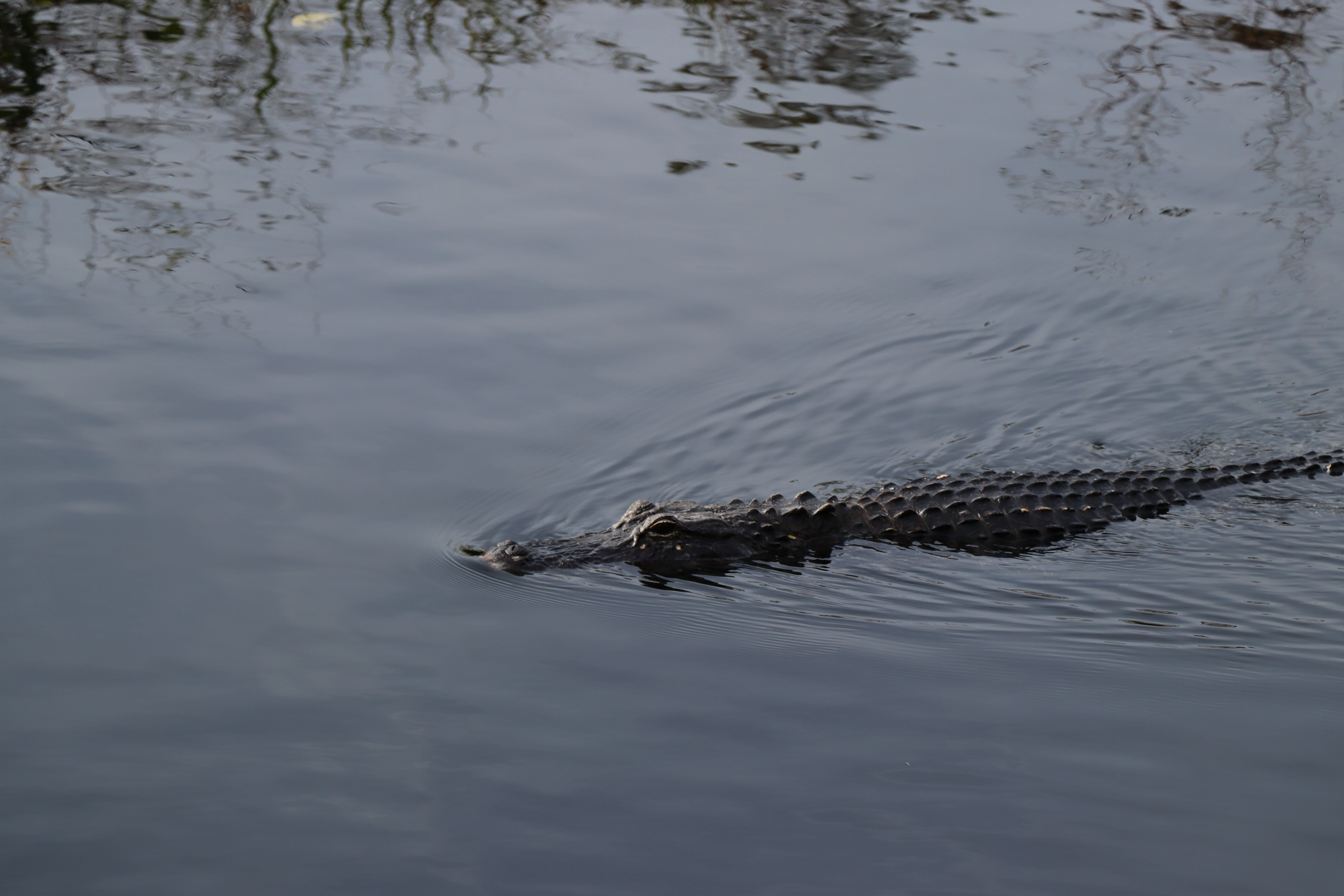
An American alligator swims through the water.
