= Clay Johnson (steamboat captain) =

American steamboat captain

Captain Clay Johnson (right) aboard the steamboat "Roseada"

Clay Johnson (November 5, 1850 – 1931) was a steamboat captain on the Kissimmee River and its chain of lakes in Florida. Born in Illinois and raised partly in New Orleans, he came to Kissimmee in 1883 at the urging of his brother-in-law, Rufus E. Rose, to help with Hamilton Disston's drainage work. He owned a fleet of steamboats that carried freight and passengers until he retired in 1926, and in 1888 one of his boats delivered machinery to Disston's sugar mill at St. Cloud.
