= St. Cloud and Sugar Belt Railway =

- Interactive Map of St. Cloud and Sugar Belt Railway

Overview
- Locale: Central Florida
- Dates of operation: 1888–1942
- Successor: Plant System; Atlantic Coast Line Railroad

Technical
- Track gauge: 4 ft 8 1/2 in (1,435 mm) standard gauge

The St. Cloud and Sugar Belt Railway (also known as simply the Sugar Belt Railway) was a historic railroad in Central Florida that ran from Kissimmee to St. Cloud and Narcoossee. It was founded in 1888 by Hamilton Disston to provide service to his sugar mill on East Lake Tohopekaliga in what would become St. Cloud. It also transported vegetables and produce from farms in Runnymeade and Narcoossee. The line was later owned by the South Florida Railroad and the Atlantic Coast Line Railroad, operating as their Narcoossee Branch. The line was abandoned in 1942.

== Route description ==
The St. Cloud and Sugar Belt Railway began in Kissimmee at a junction with the South Florida Railroad (later the Atlantic Coast Line Railroad's Main Line and the present-day Central Florida Rail Corridor). It branched off the line just east of the current Kissimmee station and headed southeast to St. Cloud. In St. Cloud, the line continued east to Lake Runnymeade, where it turned north to its terminus at Narcoossee. A turntable was located at Narcoossee to turn trains around.

== History ==
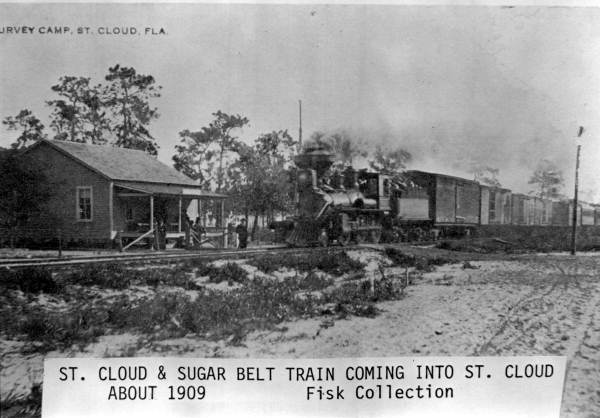
Train arriving in St. Cloud in 1909

In the late 1800s, Hamilton Disston, an industrialist and real estate developer, acquired plots of land on the south side of East Lake Tohopekaliga. In 1888, Disston opened the Disston Sugar Mill near St. Cloud to capitalize on Central's Florida flourishing sugar industry. Disston also built the St. Cloud and Sugar Belt Railway to serve the mill and other agricultural interests. A spur track connected the railroad at Peghorn Junction to the sugar mill. The railroad also provided passenger service.

In 1892, the St. Cloud and Sugar Belt Railway was leased by the South Florida Railroad, who operated the main line in Kissimmee. The South Florida Railroad was part of Henry Plant's system of railroads. In 1902, the Plant System became part of the Atlantic Coast Line Railroad. The Atlantic Coast Line continued to operate the line as the Narcoossee Branch.

In 1909, St. Cloud was incorporated as a city. A year later, the Atlantic Coast Line built a wooden depot in St. Cloud for passengers and freight. In 1918, the Atlantic Coast Line built a new brick passenger depot in St. Cloud on the site of the previous depot. The previous depot was moved north of the tracks and continued to be used for freight.

In the early 1940s, the Atlantic Coast Line was running a single mixed train (both passengers and freight) on the line between Kissimmee and St. Cloud six days a week.

Due to diminishing traffic, the line was abandoned in 1942 and tracks were removed. The 1918-built passenger depot in St. Cloud is still standing today and is now used as a VFW Post.

== Historic stations ==
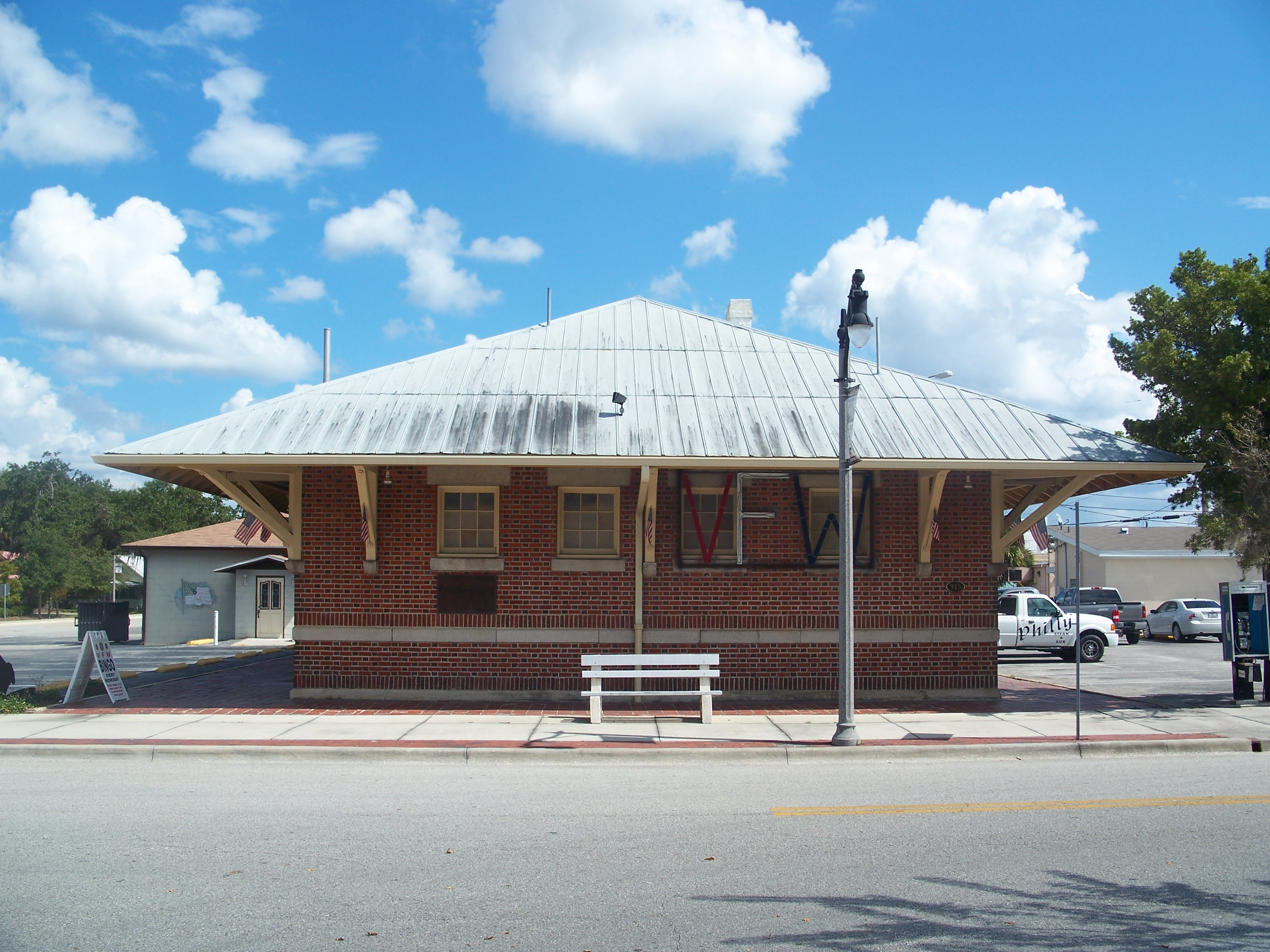
1918-built St. Cloud passenger depot

Milepost	City/Location	Station	Opening Date	Connections and notes
0.0	Kissimmee	Kissimmee		junction with South Florida Railroad (ACL)
1.0		Hammock Grove		
4.5		Peghorn		
6.1		Peghorn Junction		also known as St. Cloud Junction junction with spur to Disston Sugar Mill
9.0	St. Cloud	St. Cloud		
10.0	St. Cloud	Ashton		
11.0		Peen-To		
12.8		Runnymede		
14.4	Narcoossee	Narcoossee		
