= Kissimmee–Okeechobee–Everglades watershed =

Ecosystem in Florida, U.S.

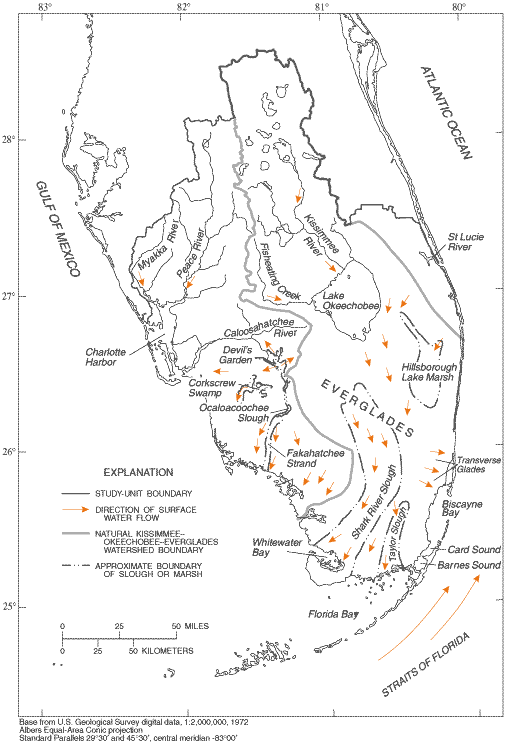
Water flow in the Kissimmee-Okeechobee-Everglades watershed prior to human modification

The Kissimmee-Okeechobee-Everglades (K–O–E) watershed drains much of the interior of the southern half of the Florida peninsula. The Kissimmee River basin and the Everglades are often treated as independent watersheds, while the Kissimmee River basin and Lake Okeechobee are also often treated as a unit. The K–O–E watershed is characterized by numerous lakes and wetlands, a slow rate of flow, and high turnover of water due to high levels of evaporation and transpiration offset by rainfall. The natural flow and water levels of the K–O–E watershed have been modified by human actions since the later part of the 19th century. Efforts to mitigate the damage of the modifications began in the last quarter of the 20th century.

== Extent ==
The Kissimmee-Okeechobee-Everglades watershed spans approximately 23,000 square kilometres (9,000 sq mi) in south and south-central Florida. The drainage basin stretches from the headwater lakes south of Orlando, in Osceola County, to Florida Bay, a distance of roughly 400 kilometres (250 mi). The system includes three primary sub-basins: the Kissimmee River basin (approximately 7,500 square kilometres [2,900 sq mi]), the Lake Okeechobee basin (approximately 3,900 square kilometres [1,500 sq mi], including the lake itself but excluding the Kissimmee River basin), and the Everglades basin, which originally encompassed about 10,000 square kilometres (4,000 sq mi) of wetland.

Before large-scale human modification beginning in the second half of the 19th century, water moved through the watershed largely unimpeded, flowing from a chain of shallow lakes near present-day Orlando through the winding Kissimmee River into Lake Okeechobee, and then southward in a broad, slow-moving sheet across the Everglades to coastal estuaries and Florida Bay. During the 20th century, drainage, channelization, and flood-control engineering fundamentally altered this natural hydrology, reducing the historic Everglades to roughly half its original area.

== Kissimmee River basin ==
The Kissimmee River originates as the outflow from East Lake Tohopekaliga, south of Orlando, and flows southward through a chain of lakes—Lake Tohopekaliga, Lake Cypress, Lake Hatchineha, and Lake Kissimmee—before continuing on to Lake Okeechobee. In its natural state, the lower Kissimmee was a highly sinuous, single-thread channel approximately 145 to 166 kilometres (90 to 103 mi) in length. The floodplain was 3.2 kilometres (2 mi) or more wide cut into a generally flat land. The river's flow varied seasonally, and occasionally overflowed its banks, with flood waters remaining on the floodplain for long periods. About one-fifth of the watershed consisted of wetlands prior to human modification. In its natural state, the river averaged 1.2 metres (3 ft 11 in) deep, varying seasonally by about 1 metre (3 ft 3 in). In the very wet year 1947, the river rose up to 3.7 metres (12 ft) above the dry season level, flooding 2,400 square kilometres (930 sq mi) in the Kissimmee basin.

The Kissimmee River basin is divided into upper and lower basins. The upper basin encompasses the Kissimmee Chain of Lakes—more than two dozen interconnected lakes—along with their tributary streams and associated marshes. The lower basin extends from the southern end of Lake Kissimmee to Lake Okeechobee. The lower Kissimmee basin is sometimes further subdivided. One such sub-basin is the watershed of Lake Istokpoga. Prior to the 20th century, Lake Istokpoga was connected to the Kissimmee River by Istokpoga Creek, but during the rainy season Lake Istokpoga overflowed, with the water flowing in a 25 mi (40 km) wide sheet across the Indian Prairie into Lake Okeechobee. Today, Lake Istokpoga drains into Lake Okeechobee through several canals that also drain the Indian Prairie, and into the Kissimmee River through a canal that has replaced Istokpoga Creek. The Kissimmee basin forms the headwaters of Lake Okeechobee and, by extension, the Everglades; it contributes approximately 60 percent of Lake Okeechobee's total water input.

Flooding along the Kissimmee River in the 1940s and 1950s led to public demands for flood prevention. The U.S. Congress authorized the Central and Southern Florida Project in 1948 to reduce flooding. Starting in 1961, the U.S. Army Corps of Engineers excavated a 9.1-metre (30 ft) deep channel (the C-38 canal) along the floodplain of the Kissimmee, reducing the 166-kilometre (103 mi) river to a 90-kilometre (56 mi) long 99-metre (325 ft) wide canal. By the time the project was finished in 1971, biologists were already raising concerns about the ecological damage to the river's floodplain caused by the channelization. Between 1999 and 2021, the Army Corps of Engineers backfilled 35 kilometres (22 mi) of the C-38 canal, restoring 71 kilometres (44 mi) of original river channel, 100 square kilometres (40 sq mi) of floodplain ecosystem, and 8,100 hectares (20,000 acres) of wetlands.

== Lake Okeechobee basin ==
The Lake Okeechobee Watershed defined by the Florida Division of Environmental Assessment and Restoration in its Lake Okeechobee Basin Management Action Plan includes more than 12,000 square kilometres (2,900,000 acres). That includes the watersheds of the Kissimmee River, Fisheating Creek, and other small streams and sloughs ending in Lake Okeechobee, as well as land south of the lake that is usually included in the Everglades. Lake Okeechobee is very shallow, with an average depth of 2.7 metres (9 ft). The deepest part of the lake bed is 0.46 metres (1.5 ft) below mean sea level. In its natural state, the lake surface normally fluctuated between 4.9 and 6.1 metres (16 and 20 ft) above sea level. Higher water levels in the lake would flood the low plains bordering the lake, and overflow the berm along the southern rim of the lake into the Everglades. High water levels also probably overflowed into Lake Hicpochee at the head of the Caloosahatchee River.

Starting in late 19th century, canals were dug leading from Lake Okeechobee. Major canals connected the lake to Lake Hicpochee and the Caloosahatchee River on the west by 1893 and to the St. Lucie River on the east by 1924. Somewhat smaller canals connected the lake through the Everglades to outlets along the lower east coast. The lake is almost completely surrounded by the Herbert Hoover Dike, with only a small area around the lower part of Fisheating Creek left open. As all of the dike, except for locks and water control structures, is constructed of earth of top of peat, the water level of the lake must be kept low enough to prevent damage to the dike, generally below 4.9 metres (16 ft) above sea level, but the level may vary from 3.4 to 5.5 metres (11 to 18 ft) above sea level. When the lake level rises too high, large amounts of water are released to the Caloosahatchee and St. Lucie rivers.

== Everglades basin ==
The Everglades basin is larger than the Everglades proper. Areas to both the east and west of the Everglades drain into it. Further south, in the vicinity of Miami, the Everglades extended to the coastal ridge.

=== Eastern Flatwoods ===
A large area between the Everglades and the Atlantic Coastal Ridge, the Eastern Flatwoods, was historically a minor, seasonal source of water into the Everglades. It is a sandy, nearly level plain, slightly higher than the Everglades, extending from Lake Okeechobee south to the New River in Fort Lauderdale. It is 40 kilometres (25 mi) wide at the northern end, narrowing to 8.0 kilometres (5 mi) wide at the New River. Prior to the drainage of the Everglades, the Eastern Flatwoods had a high water table, allowing canoes to navigate between the Atlantic coast and the Everglades during the rainy season. The pre-drainage water level created a mosaic of pine flatwoods, cypress domes, and strand swamps. Hardwood trees, grasses, sabal palms and saw palmettos occupied higher ground, while aquatic and water-tolerant plants typical of ponds and marshes covered lower areas.

The Eastern Flatwoods north of the Hillsboro Canal (i.e., in what is now Palm Beach County) was covered primarily by pines, with some cypress domes. A cypress swamp separated the Everglades and the Eastern Flatwoods in Palm Beach County. A 56-kilometre (35 mi) long 1.6-to-3.2-kilometre (1 to 2 mi) wide freshwater marsh or series of freshwater ponds separated the flatwoods from the coastal ridge, marking the edge of the drainage basin. Drainage in the Eastern Flatwoods was restricted. The Loxahatchee Slough connected the Everglades to the North Fork of the Loxahatchee River, which reaches the Atlantic Ocean at the Jupiter Inlet. The slough varied so little in elevation that the direction of flow was controlled by where rain fell. The freshwater marsh and ponds along the coastal ridge flowed into the North Fork of the Hillsboro River (now the Hillsboro Canal). There were no streams crossing the Atlantic Coastal Ridge between the Jupiter and Hillsboro inlets. The J.W. Corbett Wildlife Management Area preserves more than 24,000 hectares (60,000 acres) of the Eastern Flatwoods in northern Palm Beach County, although the landscape has been greatly modified as Everglades drainage has lowered the water table 1.8 metres (6 ft).

Cypress strands were the most common element in the southern part of the Eastern Flatwoods, south of the Hillsboro Canal in present-day Broward County. Several streams drained the area, including Hillsboro Creek, Hillsboro River, Cypress Creek, Middle River, and New River. The Atlantic Coastal Ridge becomes wider and lower in Broward County, while the Everglades proper approached the coast, and south of Cypress Creek the distinction between flatwoods and ridge becomes harder to define. Significant drainage of the Everglades to the Atlantic Ocean occurred through the streams and rivers of Broward County.

=== Big Cypress and Western Flatwoods ===
On the west side of the Everglades, water drains into the Everglades from a 16-kilometre (10 mi) wide segment of the Big Cypress Swamp and the Immokalee Rise. The Immokalee Rise is a geomopological province that includes most of Hendry County, the eastern half of Lee County, and north-central Collier County. It is fairly level, with elevations ranging from 4.6 metres (15 ft) to 14 metres (45 ft) above sea level, and sits a little higher than the geomorphological provinces surrounding it. The province was historically swampy and drained primarily by linear marshes and cypress sloughs, but much of the province has been converted to agricultural and residential use with extensive ditches and drainage canals.

That part of the Immokalee Rise that drains into the Everglades is known as the Western Flatwoods. Before the 20th century, the ground surface of the Western Flatwoods was about 1 metre (3 ft 3 in) higher than the ground surface of the sawgrass plains (now the Everglades Agricultural Area) of the northern Everglades. The oxidation of the peat soil in the sawgrass plains that followed the lowering of the water level in the Everglades resulted in the loss of much of the peat and the lowering of the ground surface in what is now the Everglades Agricultural Area by up to 2.1 metres (7 ft). Shallow depressions scattered throughout the province held standing water during the wet season. The region included pine flatwoods, ponds, and cypress domes and strands, with pines common in the north part of the region, shifting to cypress towards the southern end. Like the Eastern Flatwoods, the Western Flatwoods region was a minor source of water entering the Everglades.

Surface water in the southeastern Immokalee Rise province historically flowed south into the Mullet Slough. The Mullet Slough flowed eastward across the northern part of the Big Cypress Swamp towards the Eveglades. At the edge of the Everglades, the surface flow turned southward into a series of strands and sloughs. Unlike most sloughs, Mullet Slough is dominated by cypress trees. Due to the lack of pre-drainage observations of the flow in Mullet Slough, it is not possible to determine the size of the historical flow.

== Drainage ==
A proposal to drain the Everglades written by Buckingham Smith in 1847 helped lead to the Swamp Land Act of 1850, which allowed the transfer of "swamps and overflowed lands" from the United States government to the states so that such lands could be reclaimed. Although the act was inspired in part by plans to reclaim the Everglades, 2,862,080 acres (1,158,240 ha) in the Everglades were not transferred to Florida until 1903. In 1906, Florida began digging canals to connect Lake Okeechobee to several places on the coast of southeast Florida that were intended to drain the Everglades and open the land to agriculture. By the middle of the 20th century, the Everglades Agricultural Area on the south side of Lake Okeechobee included about 700,000 acres (280,000 ha) of intensively farmed land, primarily sugarcane plantations, at the northern end of the Everglades.

The drainage of the Everglades eventually created problems. A drought in 1944–1945 resulted in salt water intruding into the aquifers that were the source of fresh water for most of southern Florida and in widespread fires that burned into the peat soil of the Everglades. Later in the 1940s heavier than usual rainfall, particularly in 1947, caused widespread and prolonged flooding. In response, Florida and the federal government initiated the Central and Southern Florida Project to control flooding. The focus of managing the waters of the Everglades eventually shifted to protecting and restoring the Everglades. Florida passed the Everglades Forever Act in 1994. The Comprehensive Everglades Restoration Plan, developed jointly by Florida and the federal government, was approved by the U.S Congress in 2000.

== Geology ==
The Kissimmee-Okeechobee-Everglades watershed sits in a shallow trough running north-south in the Florida peninsula. The trough was created by the dissolution of the underlying limestone bedrock, which lowered the surface level along the trough without substantially disturbing surface features. Lake Okeechobee occupies an area that sagged more than the rest of the trough. The watershed extends across several geomorphological or physiographic units, including:

- Osceola Plain: The western part of this unit includes the northern and central Kissimmee Valley. Immediately below the land surface are Quaternary sediments underlain by the Avon Park Formation and Ocala Limestone. The Bombing Range Ridge, believed to have originated as an off-shore bar or barrier island, is surrounded by the Osceola Plain in the Kissimmee Valley.
- Lake Wales Ridge: The ridge forms the western edge of the Kissimmee Valley. Sediments closest to the surface in the Lake Wales Ridge include the Peace River Formation, Cypresshead Formation, and Tertiary-Quaternary dune sands.
- Okeechobee Plain: The unit consists of the southern end of the Kissimmee Valley, the low lands around the northern margin of Lake Okeechobee, and the bed of the lake. Sediments at the surface include peat, muck, and marl, underlain by undifferentiated sediments of Tertiary and Quaternary age.
- Hardee Upland: Most of this unit is outside of the watershed, but the southeastern end includes the upper part of Fisheating Creek, the second-largest source of Lake Okeechobee. Reworked sediments of the Cypresshead Formation overlay Hawthorne Group sediments in that part of the unit.
- Immokalee Rise: The eastern ten miles of this unit drains into the Everglades. The unit lies between the Caloosahatchee Valley and Big Cypress units.
- Big Cypress: The eastern ten miles of this unit drains into the Everglades.
- Everglades: This unit includes the land adjacent to the southeastern and southern shores of Lake Okeechobee and the broad zone south of there between the Big Cypress Swamp and the Atlantic Coastal Ridge to approximately the latitude of Miami, and then southwestward to the Gulf of Mexico coast south of the Ten Thousand Islands. The Tamiami Formation underlies much of the Everglades province, and lies close to the surface in the southwest part. The Miami Limestone lies at the surface in the southern part of the province, and shelly sediments are near the surface in the northern part. A thin layer of peat and marl covers all of the province. The bedrock under the Everglades varies in height. Directly south of Lake Okeechobee the West Everglades High reaches more than 3.4 metres (11 ft) above sea level, while on the east side in the Loxahatchee Channel, which runs from close to where the St. Lucie Canal connects to Lake Okeechobee southeast through Palm Beach County, the bedrock is less than 1.5 metres (5 ft) above sea level. South of the West Everglades High the Tamiaml Basin, where the bedrock level falls to less than 0.91 metres (3 ft) above sea level covers most of northern Miami-Dade County. Finally, in southern Miami-Dade County, the Shark River Slough runs southwest into mainland Monroe County, with the bedrock under the slough less than 1.2 metres (4 ft) above sea level, sitting between areas more than 2.4 metres (8 ft) above sea level.
- Rock Glades: This unit wraps around the southern end of the Atlantic Coastal Ridge. The western portion of the Rock Glades is part of the Everglades. The eastern and southern parts of the Rock Glades have also been labeled the Southeastern Saline Everglades. Miami Limestone lies at or just below the surface in the Rock Glades.

== Hydrology ==
The Kissimmee-Okeechobee-Everglades watershed is primarily in a sub-tropical climate. Precipitation varies by season, with most of the rain falling between May and October. Weather fronts (primarily cold fronts) and ocean effect weather produce precipitation in the winter, while thunderstorms produce most the rain in the summer. Tropical cyclones bring heavy rainfall at irregular intervals. Rainfall is heaviest over the Everglades due to a higher frequency of thunderstorms there during the summer, and lowest over Lake Okeechobee itself. Seasonal variation of rainfall ranges from high over the Everglades, due to the summer thunderstorms, to progressively less variation between seasons northward through the watershed.

The flow of water down the watershed depends on rainfall, and the seasonality of that rainfall causes variation in the flow, with little to no flow for several months during the dry season. While water does flow down the watershed, the flow rate is low, there is limited load capacity, and rainfall along the way is required to maintain the flow. An average of 127 centimetres (50 in) of rain falls on the watershed annually, but the runoff from the watershed amounts on average to only 19 centimetres (7.5 in) of the rain that falls. Due to high temperatures (particularly in summer), regular sea breezes, the slow rate of flow down the system, and the presence of many lakes and streams, most of the water in the watershed evaporates or is lost to the atmosphere by transpiration before reaching the sea. There is very little carryover of water from one year to the next.

While water in the Kissimmee River basin generally flows in river and stream channels, in the Everglades it moves in broad sheets. The flow in the Everglades is south to southeastward from Lake Okeechobee through northern Miami-Dade County. There is also some flow from the Big Cypress Swamp eastward into the Everglades. From the middle of Miami-Dade County, the flow is predominantly southwestward to the Shark River Slough towards the Gulf of Mexico.

Subwatersheds for Lake Okeechobee defined by the Florida Department of Environmental Protection.

The Florida Department of Environmental Protection has defined a Lake Okeechobee Basin that consists of the following nine sub-watersheds:

- Upper Kissimmee: The upper basin encompasses the Kissimmee Chain of Lakes—more than two dozen interconnected lakes—along with their tributary streams and associated marshes. It is over 400,000 hectares (1,000,000 acres) in area. Approximately 35% of the subwatershed is wetlands, 26% is used for agriculture, and 21% is urban.
- Lower Kissimmee: The lower basin extends from the southern end of Lake Kissimmee to Lake Okeechobee. It is more than 174,000 hectares (429,000 acres) in area. Approximately 51% of the subwatershed is used for agriculture, 21% is wetlands, and 18% is unforested uplands.
- Lake Istokpoga: It is more than 159,000 hectares (394,000 acres) in area. Approximately 33% of the subwatershed is used for agriculture, 17% is urban, 16% is wetlands, 15% is water, and 11% is upland forests.
- Indian Prairie: It is more than 111,900 hectares (276,500 acres) in area. Approximately 80% of the subwatershed is used for agriculture, and 12% is wetlands.
- Fisheating Creek: Fisheating Creek is the second-largest natural source of water for Lake Okeechobee (after the Kissimmee River), supplying close to 9% of the water flowing into the lake. It is more than 129,000 hectares (318,000 acres) in area. Approximately 55% of the subwatershed is used for agriculture, 24% is wetlands, and 14% is upland forests.
- Taylor Creek/Nubbin Slough: It is more than 80,000 hectares (198,000 acres) in area. Approximately 72% of the subwatershed is used for agriculture, 9% is urban, and 8% is wetlands.
- East Okeechobee: It is more than 119,000 hectares (293,000 acres) in area. Approximately 43% of the subwatershed is used for agriculture, 24% is wetlands, 14% is upland forests, and 10% is urban.
- South Okeechobee: It is more than 147,000 hectares (363,000 acres) in area. Approximately 93% of the subwatershed is used for agriculture.
- West Okeechobee: It is more than 83,000 hectares (204,000 acres) in area. Approximately 62% of the subwatershed is used for agriculture, 14% is wetlands, and 10% is upland forests.

The Florida Department of Environmental Protection has defined 47 Lake Regions in Florida. The Osceola Slope, Kissimmee/Okeechobee, Everglades, and part of the Lake Wales Ridge Transition (the lower eastern slopes of the ridge plus the Bombing Range Ridge) lake regions lie within the Kissimmee-Okeechobee-Everglades watershed.

The hydrology of the Kissimmee-Okeechobee-Everglades has been highly modified since the end of the 19th century for the purposes of land reclamation, flood control, and water management. As a result, the relationship of the three primary basins has been fundamentally altered.

== Outlets ==
Prior to the human modification of the Kissimmee-Okeechobee-Everglades watershed starting in the late 19th century, the water in the Everglades flowed into the ocean through a variety of outlets. The primary outlet was the Shark River Slough into the lower Ten Thousand Islands and Whitewater Bay. Other rivers and sloughs carried water into the Ten Thousand Islands and Florida Bay. On the east coast, water flowed from the Everglades into the Atlantic Ocean via coastal rivers, transverse glades, and groundwater seepage.

The Atlantic Coastal Ridge, which is 0.80 to 2.41 kilometres (0.5 to 1.5 mi) wide, forms the eastern rim of the Everglades basin. Between the Loxahatchee River, which reached the Ocean via the Jupiter Inlet at the northern end of Palm Beach County, and Cypress Creek, in northern Broward County, only the Hillsboro River, forming the boundary Broward and Palm Beach counties, pierced the coastal ridge. Water from the Everglades flowed through the limestone bedrock under the coastal ridge to the ocean and to the Lake Worth Lagoon. Prior to 1866, the 34-kilometre (21 mi) long Lake Worth Lagoon was a freshwater lake between the coastal ridge and the coastal barrier beach. No streams flowed into the lake, which was fed entirely by ground seepage and surface runoff from the coastal ridge.

=== Miami Rock Ridge ===
South of Cypress Creek the nature of the coastal ridge changes, becoming a string of "islands of high ground", separated by streams and transverse glades passing though it. This section, from Cypress Creek to deep in the southern Everglades, is commonly called the Miami Rock Ridge. The islands making up the ridge are 8.0 to 9.7 kilometres (5 to 6 mi) wide (east to west). The Eastern Flatwoods do not extend below Cypress Creek, and the Everglades historically abutted directly on the ridge south of there.

Water passed from the Everglades through 0.40-to-1.61-kilometre (0.25 to 1 mi) wide gaps in the Miami Rock Ridge by sheet flow and by streams in channels. The gaps are called "transverse glades" because they held sawgrass marshes similar to those in the Everlades. Some transverse glades even had tree islands similar to those in the sawgrass marshes of the Everglades.

The transverse glades in the northern part of the Miami Rock Ridge, from Cypress Creek to the Miami River, had a peat soil over a sand substratum, with the sand forming a wedge, starting from the Everglades and increasing in thickness towards the east, while the peat was thickest at the Everglades end, thinning towards the east as the sand wedge thickened. Drainage of the Everglades exposed the peat in the transverse glades, leading to its destruction by oxidation, and by the 1940s the peat had disappeared from much of the transverse glades.

On the east coast, in Miami-Dade County, water from the Everglades flowed into Biscayne Bay through rivers, creeks, and sloughs via transverse glades, channels crossing the Miami Rock Ridge (the southern end of the Atlantic Coastal Ridge in Broward and Miami-Dade counties). Ground water also flowed through the porous underlying limestone feeding freshwater marshes and springs along the shores of the bay, with some freshwater springs under the bay waters. Springs can still be found in the bay, but the water from them is now brackish. Up to 40% of the outflow from the Everglades may have reached the Atlantic Ocean through the coastal rivers in Broward and Miami-Dade counties.

Streams fed by water flowing from the Everglades through transverse glades in northern Miami-Dade County included the Oleta River, Arch Creek, Biscayne Canal, Little River and Miami River. During seasonal high water in the Everglades, water also flowed through transverse glades south of the Miami River feeding streams such as Snapper Creek and Black Creek. All of the rivers and creeks flowing into Biscayne Bay, and most of the sloughs, with the exception of the Oleta River, were canalized during the 20th century. Most transverse glades have had canals dug through them.

The portion of the Miami Rock Ridge south of Miami, also known as the Everglades Keys, (Note: John Kunkel Small defines the Everglade Keys as, "a chain of islands enclosed by the southern portion of the Everglades, except where some of the islands come in contact with the upper part of Bay Biscayne. The chain stretches in crescent form from somewhat north of the Miami River southward towards Cape Sable for a distance of about fifty-five miles".) turns southwestward into the southern Everglades.

== Sources ==
- Bazan, Stephanie; Gaul, Larissa; Huber, Vanessa; Paladino, Nicole; Tulsky, Emily (2020). Environmental Plan for Kissimmee Okeechobee Everglades Tributaries (EPKOET) (PDF) (Report). University of Delaware, Water Resources Center.
- Boning, Charles R. (2007). Florida's Rivers. Sarasota, Florida: Pineapple Press. ISBN 978-1-56164-400-1.
- Brooks, H. Kelly (1974). "Lake Okeechobee". In Gleason, Patrick J. (ed.). Environments of South Florida: Present and Past. Memoir. Vol. 2. Miami, Florida: Miami Geological Society. pp. 256–286.
- Corcoran, Eugene F.; Brown, Melvin S.; Baddour, Frederick R.; Chasens, Steven A.; Freay, Anna D. (February 2005). "1983 Biscayne Bay Hydrocarbon Study". National Oceanic and Atmospheric Administration. (automatically downloads pdf)
- Havens, Karl E. (April 2018). "Managing High Water Levels in Florida's Largest Lake: Lake Okeechobee". University of Florida Institute of Food and Agricultural Science.
- Hartwell, James H. (1970). Some Aspects of the Availability of Water from the Everglades to the Everglades National Park, Florida. U.S. Geological Survey, Water Resources Division.
- Kushlan, James A. (1991). "The Everglades". In Livingston, Robert J. (ed.). The Rivers of Florida. Ecological Studies. Vol. 83. New York, NY: Springer New York. pp. 121–142. doi:10.1007/978-1-4612-3036-6_8. ISBN 978-1-4612-7771-2.
- Lodge, Thomas E. (2005) [1994]. The Everglades Handbook: Understanding the Ecosystem (Second ed.). CRC Press. ISBN 1-56670-614-9.
- McCally, David (1999). The Everglades: An Evironmental History. Gainesville, Florida: University Press of Florida. ISBN 978-0-8130-1827-0.
- McVoy, Christopher W.; Said, Winnifred Park; Obeysekera, Jayantha; VanArman, Joel A.; Dreschel, Thomas W. (2011), Landscapes and Hydrology of the Predrainage Everglades, South Florida Water Management District
- Parker, Garald G. (1974). "Hydrology of the pre-drainage system of the Everglades in southern Florida". In Gleason, Patrick J. (ed.). Environments of South Florida: Present and Past. Memoir. Vol. 2. Miami, Florida: Miami Geological Society. pp. 18–27.
- Wang, John D.; Luo, Jiangang; Ault, Jerald S. (May 2003). "Flows, salinity, and some implications for larval transport in South Biscayne Bay, Florida". Bulletin of Marine Science. 72: 695–723 – via Ingenta Connect.
- Williams, Christopher P.; Scott, Thomas M.; Upchurch, Sam B. (2022). Florida Geomorphology Atlas (PDF). Special Publication 59 (Report). Tallahassee, Florida: Florida Geological Survey.
- "The South Florida Ecosystem" (pdf). South Florida Multi-Species Recovery Plan (Report). Bethesda, Maryland: U. S. Fish and Wildlife Service. May 18, 1999.
- "Kissimmee River". South Florida Water Management District.
- "The restoration plan in context". Progress Towards Restoring the Everglades: The Third Biennial Review. Washington, D.C.: The National Academies Press. 2010. pp. 23–61. ISBN 978-0-309-16006-3.
- "Lake Kissimmee and the Chain of Lakes". Florida State Parks.
- Lake Okeechobee Basin Management Action Plan (PDF) (Report). Tallahassee, Florida: Florida Department of Environmental Protection. April 2025.
- "Recent Developments in Everglades Restoration". U.S. Congress. January 14, 2025.
- "Lake Worth Lagoon & Intracoastal Waterway". Historical Society of Palm Beach County. Archived from the original on April 9, 2023.
