= Disston Sugar Mill Ruins =

Historic site in St. Cloud, Florida, U.S.

Coordinates: 28.2616°N 81.3161°W

- St. Cloud sugar mill
- Disston Sugar Mill in operation on the Hamilton Disston Sugar Plantation

- Location within Florida
- Interactive map of Disston Sugar Mill Ruins
- Location: St. Cloud, Florida
- Part of: Hamilton Disston Sugar Plantation

History
- Built: 1888
- Built by: Hamilton Disston
- Built for: Florida Sugar Manufacturing Company

Site notes
- Condition: Ruins
- Owner: Osceola County, Florida
- Public access: Yes

The Disston Sugar Mill Ruins (also known as the St. Cloud sugar mill) was a brick sugar factory built by Hamilton Disston in 1888. The mill was built on a sugar plantation in St. Cloud that he co-owned with Rufus E. Rose on the east bank of the St. Cloud Canal, south of East Lake Tohopekaliga. The plantation was later reorganized as the Florida Sugar Manufacturing Company. Operations declined after both the Panic of 1893 and Disston's death in 1896, after which the plantation went dormant, and its land and machinery sold off.

== Background ==
Rufus E. Rose began the plantation on 420 acres (170 ha) near East Lake Tohopekaliga. Rose, then a company superintendent, bought the land within a few months of the completion of a drainage canal in September 1884.

Rose began ditching the land in January 1886, planting 20 acres of sugarcane that spring, along with rice and corn, and increased the cane to 90 acres (36 ha) the next season.

In 1887, Disston bought a half interest in the plantation. Disston's investment paid for a sugar factory, and increased the size of the plantation by 1,800 acres (730 ha).

=== Construction ===
Disston brought Philadelphia contractors to build the mill in summer 1888, with local contractor Frank Bass assisting in the construction. The mill cost $350,000 to build.

According to Pat Dodson, the bricks and heavy machinery were likely shipped to Kissimmee on Henry B. Plant's South Florida Railroad. Barges towed them across Lake Tohopekaliga and up the St. Cloud Canal behind a steamer owned by Captain Clay Johnson. A small oil-burning boat could not make headway against the current, so a yoke of oxen on the canal bank pulled a towline on its bow. Some of the milling machinery carried through the canal were heavier than five tons.

=== Design and equipment ===
The brick mill and its warehouse stood on the east bank of the St. Cloud Canal, a few yards south of East Lake Tohopekaliga. The mill's capacity was nearly 372 tons of cane a day, with an average of 200 tons.

The crushing machinery combined two second-hand mills, one with three rollers and one with two. The plant had working clarifiers, double-effect evaporators, a vacuum pan, and centrifugals. O.C. Sutton, the chemist in charge in 1889 and 1890, called the machinery "crude," the clarifier "inefficient," and the settling tanks "not of sufficient capacity."

== Operations ==
Disston employed 300 to 400 Black workers on the plantation. Several hundred Italians also worked on the plantation, many of whom were seasonal workers who came to the plantation by train from Tampa. The plantation also hired other transient workers. Pat Dodson reports contradictory accounts of living conditions.

Workers' homes at the Hamilton Disston Sugar Mill

The plantation had a commissary, a boarding house, a blacksmith shop, a pumphouse, tenant houses, and homes for the superintendent and the manager. The company issued tokens that workers spent at the commissary.

Disston built a spur that connected the St. Cloud and Sugar Belt Railway to the mill. The plant used it to bring in supplies and ship out its products. Disston built and partly owned the railroad. His group bought the right-of-way in fall 1888 and transferred it to the railroad company in 1890. The railroad hauled processed sugarcane in barrels to Kissimmee's steamboat wharves and railroad depot.

John Jacob Astor and Henry B. Plant were among those who visited the plant during its operation.

=== Ownership ===
In 1890, Disston and Rose disagreed over company policy. Disston expected a federal sugar bounty and wanted to expand operations considerably, whereas Rose opposed the expansion. Rose argued that any bounty law would be short-lived, and thought it too bold. Rose sold his half-interest to Disston and resigned as superintendent.

== See also ==
- Disston Saw Works
- Draining and development of the Everglades
