= Makinson =

Makinson may refer to:

== People ==
- Carolyn Makinson, American demographer
- David Makinson (born 1941), Australian logician
- David Makinson (cricketer) (born 1961), English cricketer
- Jessica Makinson, American actress and comedian
- John Makinson, British businessman
- Joseph Makinson (born 1836), English cricketer
- Rachel Makinson, Australian scientist
- Richard Makinson (1913–1979), Australian physicist
- Robert Owen Makinson (born 1956), Australian botanist
- Thomas Makinson (born 1991), English rugby league player

== Places ==
- Makinson Inlet, Nunavut, Canada
- Makinson Island, Florida, U.S.
