= Narcoossee, Florida =

Unincorporated community in Florida, U.S.

Coordinates: 28°18′N 81°14′W

Narcoossee is an unincorporated community in eastern Osceola County, Florida, United States. It is located on the east side of East Lake Tohopekaliga. The only major road which runs through Narcoossee is County Road 15, commonly referred to as Narcoossee Road, which connects to U.S. Route 192. Every spring starting in the mid 1990s, the community held the annual Battle at Narcoossee Mill in Chisolm Park, which was a Civil War reenactment. No actual battles happened here. The event was discontinued in 2024 due to upcoming development at the park taking place soon.

== History ==
Narcoossee began in the late 19th century as a settlement by E. Nelson Fell, on a huge tract of land on the shore of East Lake Tohopekaliga. The town name is derived from the Creek word for "black bear."

English settlers began to arrive in 1883, drawn by newspaper advertisements extolling the virtues of the area and its citrus groves, promising an annual income of $10,000 once the groves matured. In 1888 the St. Cloud and Sugar Belt Railway (later acquired by the Atlantic Coast Line Railroad) came through the town area, expanding the citrus shipping possibilities and improving the local economy. One of the prominent English citizens built Saint Peter's Episcopal Church which opened in 1898. After a series of hard freezes in the 1890s that wiped out citrus groves and a severe drought in 1908, many settlers gave up and left the area. In 1910, Fell acquired title to 144 square miles (370 km^{2}) in Indian River County, founded the town of Fellsmere, and took many of the Narcoossee settlers with him. Only two families remained, and the church closed. In 1930, the church building was dismantled and moved to St. Cloud where it was joined to the existing church there becoming the church of St Luke and St Peter. Like the Central Florida area around it, population growth has spread to Narcoosee both from Orlando and from St Cloud with housing developments springing up. The heart of the 'town' rests at the blinking light which is the intersection of Jones Road and Highway 15, also known as Narcoossee Road.

Narcoossee is part of the Orlando–Kissimmee Metropolitan Statistical Area.
