= Paradise Island (Florida) =

- Interactive map of Paradise Island

Geography
- Location: Lake Tohopekaliga
- Coordinates: 28°15′46″N 81°24′00″W

Administration
- United States of America
- State: Florida
- County: Osceola

Demographics
- Population: 0 (2016)

Paradise Island is one of three islands in Lake Tohopekaliga, Osceola County, Florida. It was purchased by the State of Florida on October 27, 2000 in cooperation with the Florida Fish and Wildlife Conservation Commission (FWC), The Trust for Public Land, and Osceola County. Ownership was transferred to FWC on December 28, 2000. The island is managed by FWC as a wildlife and educational preserve.
