= Reptile World Serpentarium =

Reptile zoo in St. Cloud, Florida

Coordinates: 28.2427°N 81.2103°W

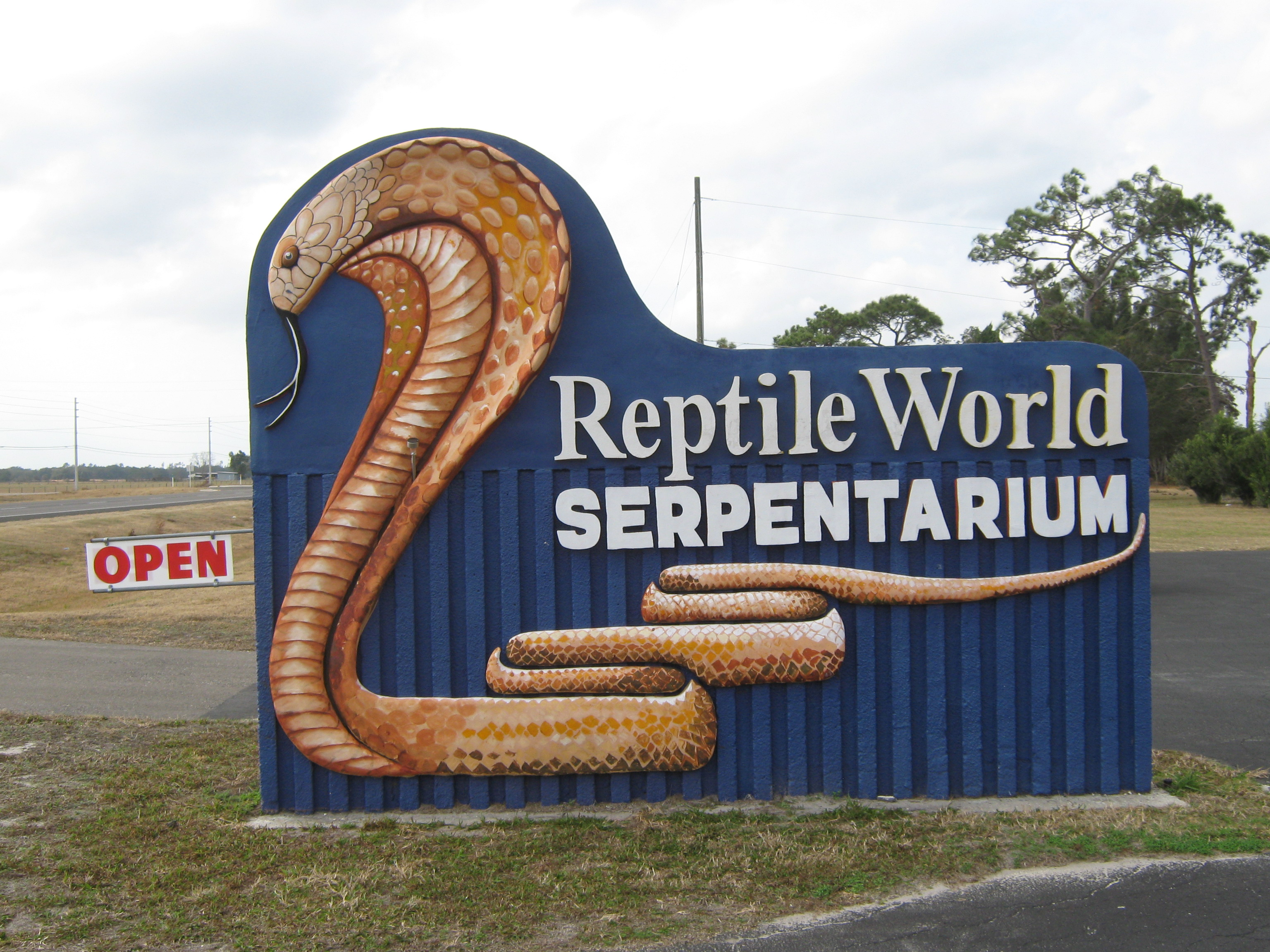
- Reptile world Serpentarium sign.
- Interactive map of Reptile World Serpentarium
- Date opened: 1972
- Location: St. Cloud, Florida
- No. of species: 75
- Owner: George Van Horn
- Website: Official website

Reptile World Serpentarium is a reptile zoo in St. Cloud, Osceola County, Florida. It features more than 75 species of snakes, as well as lizards, crocodiles, alligators, and turtles. It is operated by the herpetologist George Van Horn. In addition to having animals on display, it has venom milking shows.

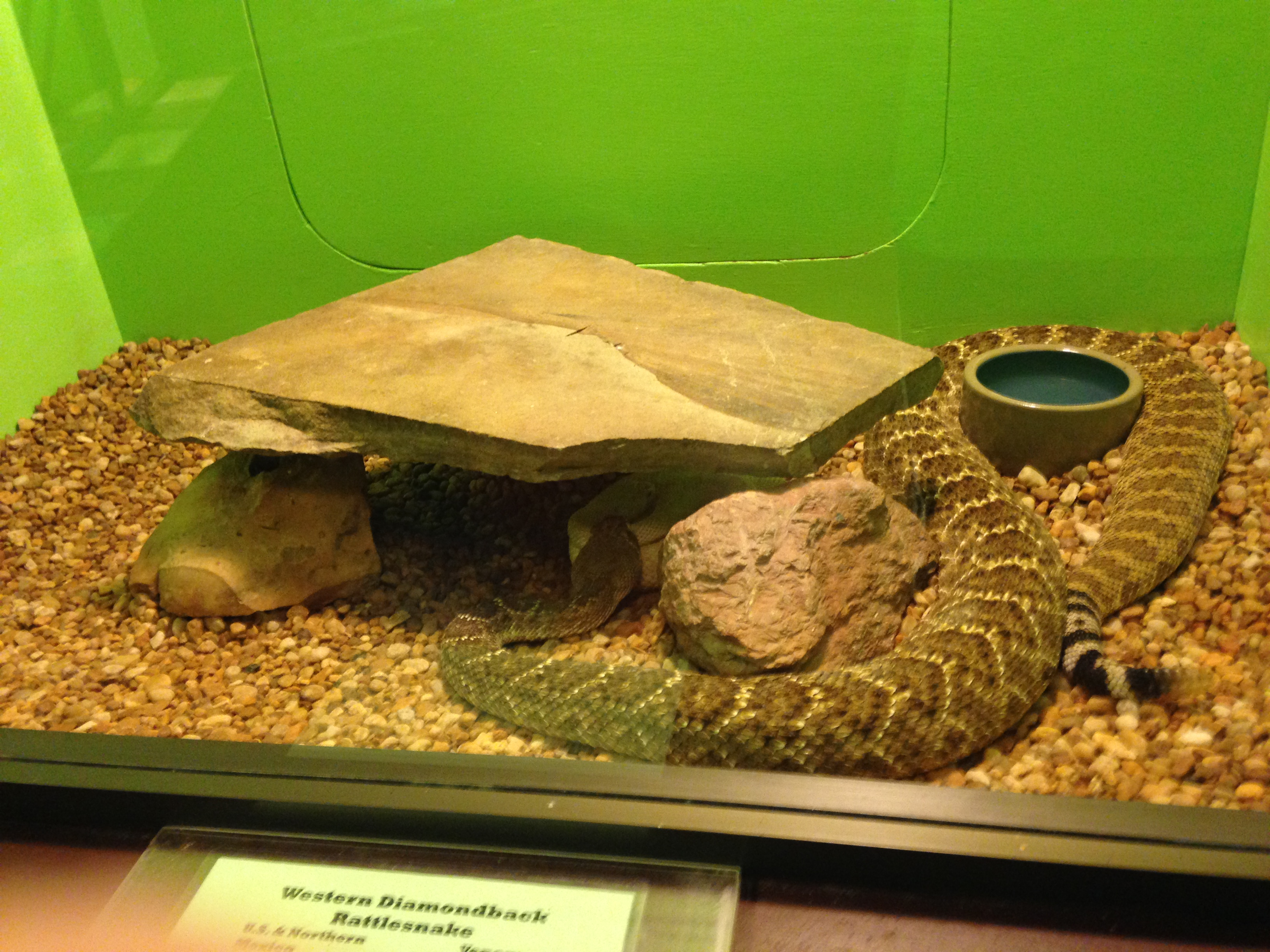
Western Diamondback rattlesnake in exhibit.

== Milking shows ==
The zoo's most prominent feature is its daily venom-milking show. These shows involve George Van Horn and Rosa Van Horn milking venomous snakes such as rattlesnakes, cottonmouths, and cobras for their venom while a crowd watches (separated by a glass window).

The collected venom is stored in a biotoxin laboratory and supplied to universities and other laboratories for medical and herpetological research.

== George Van Horn ==
A native of Miami, Florida, George Van Horn has maintained a lifelong interest in herpetology. According to a first-person account published in Orlando Magazine in 2011 at the age of 67, when he was six years old he met Bill Haast who was the owner of the Miami Serpentarium and became his mentor. Van Horn modeled the Reptile World Serpentarium on the Miami Serpentarium.

The first snake Van Horn ever handled was a rattlesnake, which struck at him, but hit his fingernail without penetrating the skin. He then started milking a cottonmouth in his grandmother's basement and began filling a handmade vial of venom from it. He opened up the Reptile World Serpentarium in St. Cloud in 1972.

Van Horn said in 2011 that he had been bitten at least 12 times by venomous snakes. He received hospital treatment for king cobra bites in 1977 and again in 1995, and said he brings his own vial of venom to the hospital in such instances. He has also provided antivenom to assist first responders.
