= Sam Riggs =

American country music singer-songwriter

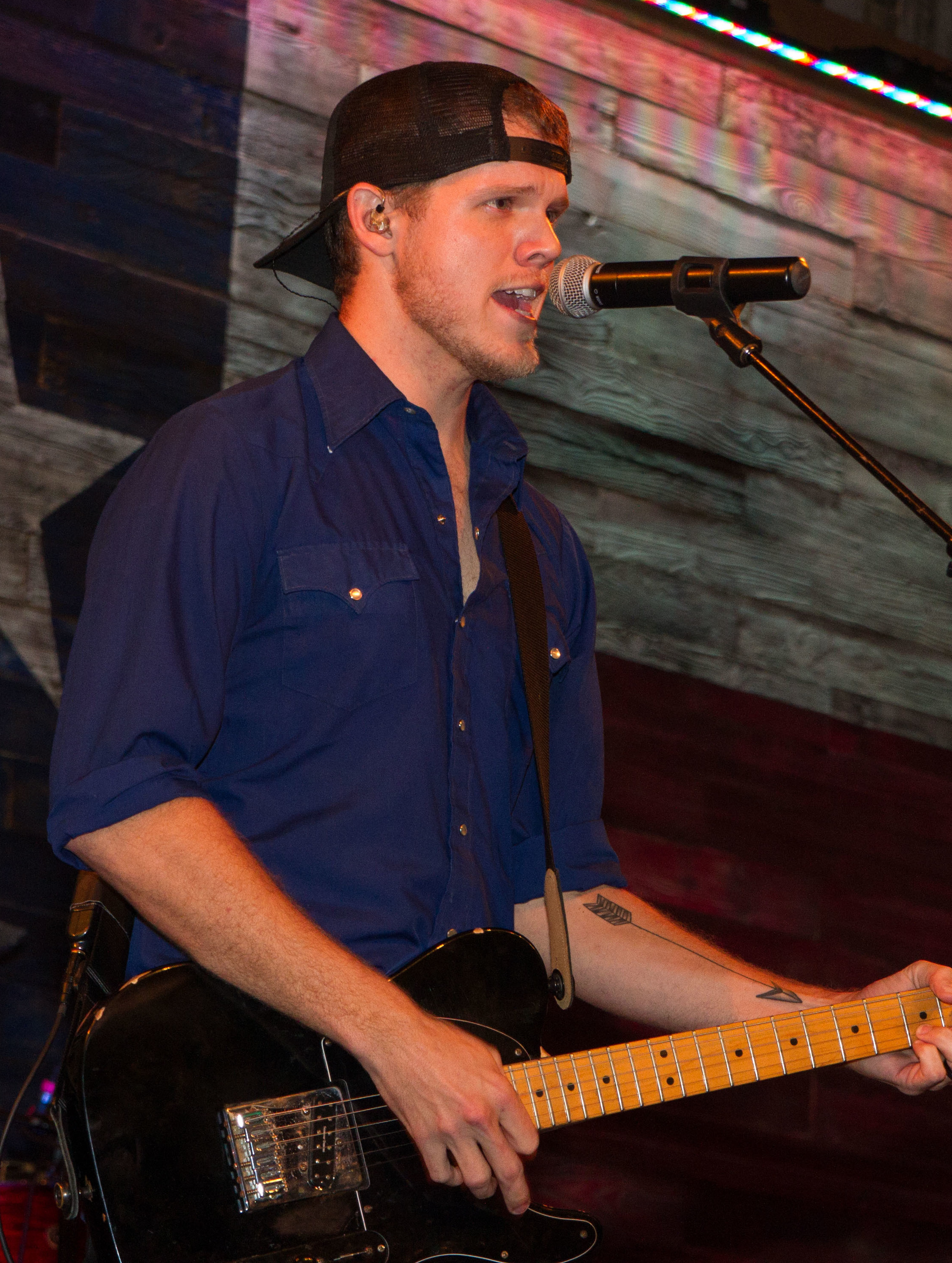
- Riggs performing in 2014

Background information
- Born: St. Cloud, Florida, U.S.
- Origin: Austin, Texas, U.S.
- Genres: Country
- Occupation: Singer-songwriter
- Years active: 2007–present
- Label: Deep Creek Records
- Website: www.samriggsmusic.com

Sam Riggs is an American country music singer-songwriter.

== Biography ==
Sam Riggs was born in St. Cloud, Florida. He moved to Austin, Texas in August 2007 when he was 19 years old. He worked in manual labour but also performed his songs in local cafes and bars. Riggs released his first extended play, Hairpin Trigger Heart, in 2010. He met Ray Wylie Hubbard in 2011, who taught him his fingerpicking style. Riggs sold all of his possessions to finance the release of his second extended play, Lighthouse, released in 2012.

Riggs' full-length debut album, Outrun the Sun, was released on October 29, 2013 by Vision Entertainment. The album was released under the moniker Sam Riggs and the Night People. The first two singles reached the top 10 on the Texas Music Chart. The video for the single "When the Lights Go Out" peaked at number one on CMT's fan-voted Pure 12 Pack Countdown. One of the album's songs, "Collide", was featured in the TV show Nashville. The album sold over 10,000 copies and earned him Artist of the Year at the first Texas Magazine Texas Music Awards.

In February 2015, Riggs released "Second Hand Smoke", the first song from his second studio album. The album, Breathless, was released on February 19, 2016. Riggs produced the album with Eric Herbst. It was released on his own record label, Deep Creek Records, and funded by a Kickstarter project. Breathless debuted at number 12 on the Billboard Country Albums chart and number 168 on the Billboard 200, selling 3,800 copies in its first week of release. On February 1, 2019, Sam released his first single of 2019, "Obsessed" and on March 1, 2019, he released his current single, "Until My Heart Stops Beating".

== Personal life ==
Riggs is currently married and has a son.

== Discography ==
=== Albums ===
Title	Album details	Peak chart positions			
Title	Album details	US Country	US	US Heat	US Indie
Outrun the Sun (Sam Riggs and the Night People)	Release date: October 29, 2013; Label: Vision Entertainment	62	—	—	—
Breathless	Release date: February 19, 2016; Label: Deep Creek/Thirty Tigers	12	168	3	12
"—" denotes releases that did not chart

=== Extended plays ===
Title	Album details
Hairpin Trigger Heart (Sam Riggs Band)	Release date: November 11, 2010; Label: self-released
Lighthouse	Release date: August 4, 2012; Label: self-released

=== Music videos ===
Year	Video	Director
2013	"Your Troubadour"	Natalie Rhea
2013	"When the Lights Go Out"	John Reynolds
2014	"Hold on and Let Go"	Phillip Guzman

=== Singles ===
Date	Title	Writers
February 1, 2019	"Obsessed"	Sam Riggs, Andy Sheridan and Jared Scott
March 1, 2019	"Until My Heart Stops Beating"	Sam Riggs, Andy Sheridan, Chris Loocke and Matt McGinn
April 5, 2019	"Don't Stop Now"	Sam Riggs and Jordan Daugherty
May 3, 2019	"Run"	Sam Riggs, Andy Sheridan, and Aby Gutierrez
