= Hamilton Disston =

American industrialist and real-estate developer

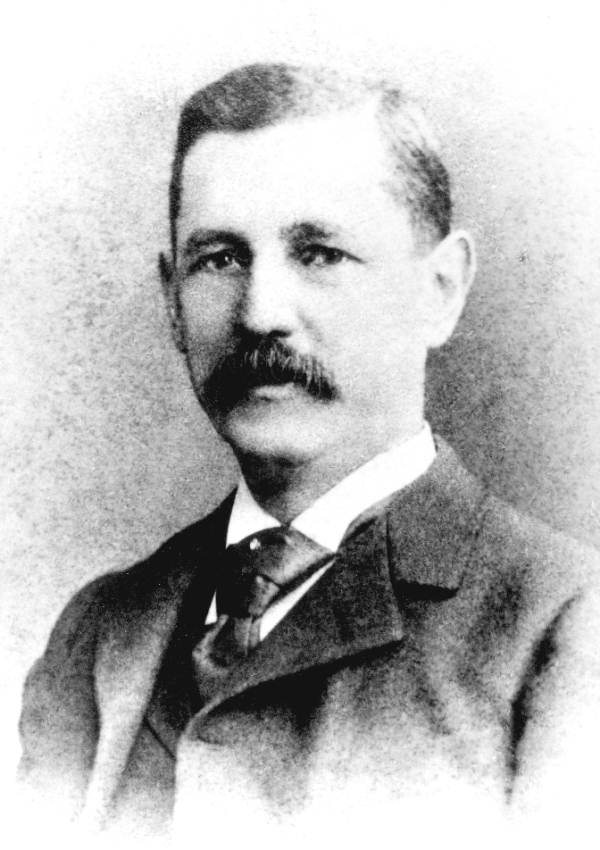
- Born: August 23, 1844; Philadelphia, Pennsylvania, United States
- Died: April 30, 1896 (aged 51); Philadelphia, Pennsylvania, United States
- Resting place: Laurel Hill Cemetery
- Occupations: Industrialist, Real estate developer

Hamilton Disston (August 23, 1844 – April 30, 1896) was an American industrialist and real-estate developer who purchased 4 million acres (16,000 km²) of Florida land in 1881, an area larger than the state of Connecticut. Disston was the son of Pennsylvania-based industrialist Henry Disston who formed Disston & Sons Saw Works, which Hamilton later ran and which was one of the largest saw manufacturing companies in the world.

Hamilton Disston's investment in the infrastructure of Florida spurred growth throughout the state. His related efforts to drain the Everglades triggered the state's first land boom with numerous towns and cities established through the area. Disston's land purchase and investments were directly responsible for creating or fostering the towns of Kissimmee, St. Cloud, Gulfport, Tarpon Springs, and indirectly aided the rapid growth of St. Petersburg, Florida. He furthermore oversaw the successful cultivation of rice and sugarcane near the Kissimmee area.

Although Disston's engineered canals aided water transport and steamboat traffic in Florida, he was ultimately unsuccessful in draining the Kissimmee River floodplain or lowering the surface water around Lake Okeechobee and in the Everglades. He was forced to sell much of his investments at a fraction of their original costs. However, his land purchase primed Florida's economy and allowed railroad magnates Henry Flagler and Henry Plant to build rail lines down the east coast of Florida, and another joining the west coast, which directly led to the domination of the tourist and citrus industries in Florida. Disston's immediate impact was in the Philadelphia area, where he was active in Republican politics and a philanthropist, but his legacy is often associated with the draining and development of Florida.

== Early life and business ==
Hamilton Disston was born in Philadelphia, the eldest son of nine children born to Mary Steelman and Henry Disston, an English immigrant and descendant of French nobility. Disston's father was a successful industrialist who rose from being orphaned just days after arriving in the United States to running the Keystone Saw Works when Hamilton was a child. Henry Disston was responsible for multiple machining and saw patents, and in the spirit of Victorian-era paternalism, envisioned and engineered a community around his steel factory in Tacony, Pennsylvania. After attending public school, Hamilton left at 15 years old, opting for an apprenticeship at the saw factory which, by that time, was a $500,000-per-year international venture. His father threatened to fire him for repeatedly leaving the factory to work for a volunteer fire department. Hamilton twice joined the Union Army only to have Henry purchase his release, but Hamilton organized a company of saw factory employees during the Gettysburg campaign. Henry finally agreed to support the "Disston Volunteers" financially.

After the American Civil War, Disston returned to work in his father's factory as an executive. In 1878, following the death of Henry Disston, Hamilton and his brothers Horace, William, and Jacob inherited the company which had been renamed to Henry Disston & Sons. Hamilton became the controlling member of the 2,000-employee company and expanded production to 1.4 million hacksaws and 3 million files per year. Only one month after Henry's death, Hamilton gave President Rutherford B. Hayes a tour of the factory where an unshaped piece of steel was manufactured into a 26-inch (660 mm) hand saw in only 42 minutes, and was presented to the president at the end of the tour—etched with his name.

While the saw manufacturing business continued growing, Disston branched out, investing in a chemical firm, a Chinese railroad, real estate in Atlantic City, New Jersey and mining in the western United States.

== Disston Land Purchase ==
In the 1840s and 1850s, the sparsely populated state of Florida came to own approximately 15,000,000 acres (61,000 km^{2}) of mostly swamp land, granted by the U.S. Congress to states with wetlands for the purpose of reclaiming the land under water by constructing canals and levees. In Florida, consolidated grants for the purpose of building rail infrastructure and reclaiming wetlands were placed in a trust called the Internal Improvement Fund of the State of Florida (IIF). The trust fund was managed by the governor of Florida and four state officials. The fund pledged land to railroad companies and guaranteed bonds issued by the railroad companies on the land. When the high costs associated with the American Civil War and Reconstruction caused railroad companies to default on the bonds, the fund became liable and rapidly sank into debt and eventually into Federal Court receivership. By the time Governor George Franklin Drew took office in 1877, the fund was nearly $1 million in debt. The state constitution forbade issuing bonds to repay it; investors were not interested in Florida, no rail lines were built, and progress in the state stalled.

In 1877, diplomat Henry Shelton Sanford invited Disston, an avid sport fisherman, on a fishing trip through Florida. During the trip, Disston realized the possibility that enormous tracts of land could be reclaimed for agriculture by using canals to drain Florida's Lake Okeechobee.

An application for foreclosure of the IIF and its land was filed in federal court in 1880. Negotiations to relieve the debt were held with various potential investors, including Sanford and Alexander St. Clair-Abrams, but did not come to fruition. Disston and five associates, meanwhile, entered into a land reclamation contract with the Internal Improvement Fund in January 1881. The contract stipulated that Disston and associates would be deeded half of whatever land his Atlantic and Gulf Coast Canal and Okeechobee Land Company reclaimed around Lake Okeechobee, the Kissimmee, Caloosahatchee and Miami Rivers. Congressman and Disston family friend, William D. "Pig Iron" Kelley, described Disston's first contract: "He instituted broad preliminary investigations from which he received satisfactory reports; he surveyed the entire field of the proposed work, and with Napoleonic instinct and foresight saw in the proposition an opportunity to promote his country's welfare by the reclamation of a more than kingly domain.

Disston stood to gain up to 12,000,000 acres (49,000 km^{2}) with his drainage contract, although it would displace numerous squatters. Florida's Armed Occupation Act of 1842 had granted land to squatters in order to force the local Seminole Indians off the land, but Disston's contract would force the squatters off any land that Disston could show was submerged. The drainage contract, however, was in jeopardy because it did not affect the massive debt bearing down on the Internal Improvement Fund. Court orders related to the debt threatened to derail the contract so Governor William D. Bloxham visited Disston in Philadelphia to persuade him to relieve the debt. During the visit, Disston tentatively agreed to purchase four million acres (16,000 km²) of Internal Improvement Fund land for 25 cents per acre, an agreement which became a formal contract on June 1, 1881. Disston signed the contract on June 14, and The New York Times described the transaction with, "What is claimed to be the largest purchase of land ever made by a single person in the world". It made him the largest landowner in the United States. On December 17, 1881, Disston sold two million acres (8,000 km²) of his land to English Member of Parliament, Sir Edward James Reed, for $600,000.

== Promotion and politics ==
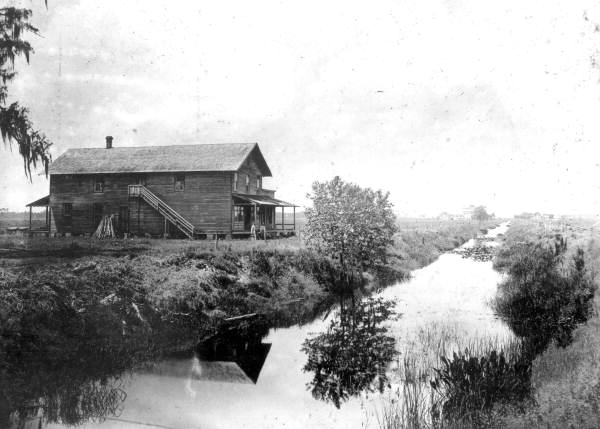
A photograph taken circa 1900 showing the St. Cloud Canal dredged by Disston's company, running through a sugar plantation also owned by Disston near St. Cloud, Florida

While some in Florida disapproved of the sale for giving away the land too cheaply, it had positive effects. In the four years following Disston's purchase, four times as many rail lines were added than the 20 preceding years. Land sales multiplied six times after the sale and the state's taxable property value doubled. Around 150,000 tourists came to Florida during the winter of 1884 alone.

To lure people to Florida, Disston opened real estate offices across America as well as England, Scotland, Germany, Italy, Sweden and Denmark. He promoted himself as owning two-thirds of the entire state. These efforts drew people to the Orlando area; and the major cities of Sarasota and Naples, Florida grew out of land sold by Disston. Fort Myers became the base of his Caloosahatchee River dredging efforts and its population rapidly increased. Disston's headquarters were on the shores of Lake Tohopekaliga and became the city of Kissimmee.

Disston "recreationed" in politics, starting as early as 1876 in local issues. He and three other industrialists in Philadelphia—James McManes, William Leeds, and David Lane— were known as the "Big Four", controlling Republican nominations and appointments to city positions in a machine system until new political bosses replaced them in 1890. His wealth allowed him to associate with tycoons and political celebrities, and he was often sought after to advise politicians though he refused to run for office. He publicly supported future president Benjamin Harrison, Congressman William D. Kelley, and political boss Matthew Quay.

In 1883, he arranged for President Chester A. Arthur, a fellow Republican, to take a fishing trip to Kissimmee as part of a large publicity campaign for the city. Disston founded a 20,000-acre (81 km^{2}) sugarcane plantation, out of which sprang the city of St. Cloud. Refineries for the plantation were constructed in Kissimmee and near Lake Okeechobee.

The key to Disston's Florida plans was a massive dredging effort to drain the Kissimmee River floodplain that flows into Lake Okeechobee, to remove the surface water in the Everglades and the surrounding lands regardless of season. The canals were engineered to guide the overflow of Lake Okeechobee into the St. Lucie River and then into the Atlantic Ocean in the east; the Caloosahatchee River overflow was directed to the Gulf of Mexico in the west, and eventually canals were to be constructed south through the Everglades. Disston was advised to begin with a large canal connecting Lake Okeechobee with the St. Lucie but the prohibitive costs forced him to begin with smaller dredging operations to straighten the Kissimmee River and to connect Lake Okeechobee with the Caloosahatchee. Dredging commenced around Lake Okeechobee during the winter of 1881–1882. In June 1883, a report concluded that the Kissimmee valley was indeed drying up as Disston planned, and another report a year later reported further drainage with nearly 3,000,000 acres (12,000 km^{2}) of reclaimed land credited to Disston.

== Disston City ==
In addition to dredging, Disston's plans included the creation of a major city in the Tampa Bay area to rival the budding city of Tampa. By 1884, he established the Lake Butler Villa Company, one of four land companies he operated. Disston founded the town of Tarpon Springs, much of which was built by Lake Butler Villa Company, including a commercial pier and two hotels, using lumber from his sawmill in Atlantic City, New Jersey. After deciding that Tarpon Springs would not become the metropolis he hoped, Disston shifted his efforts south and established a town he called Disston City. He invested heavily in steamboats and built a wharf, a school, and the area's first hotel. In 1885, a doctor from Maryland declared the area to be the healthiest in the world, which drew many investors and developers including F.A. Davis, who partnered with Disston's brother Jacob in further developing the Pinellas peninsula, where Pinellas County was established.

In the mid-1880s, Russian developer Peter Demens was building the Orange Belt Railway across central Florida with a planned western terminus in the Tampa Bay area. On December 1, 1886, Disston offered Demens approximately 60,000 acres (240 km^{2}) of land to stretch his railroad to Disston City. Demens countered with a demand of an additional 50,000 acres (200 km^{2}), but Disston refused, mistakenly believing that Disston City would thrive if the railroad merely came close to the area. Instead Demens terminated his railway at St. Petersburg, which he named after Saint Petersburg, his home city in Russia. While Disston City never met Disston's expectations and became the small city of Gulfport, St. Petersburg reaped the rewards of Demens's railway and became one of the larger cities in Florida.

== Disappointment ==
Disston's success at draining peninsular Florida quickly turned to disappointment. The positive report of his drainage results in 1883 was followed by a dreadful report in 1887. While it still credited Disston with draining parts of the upper Kissimmee valley, it credited a drought with drying the area north of Lake Okeechobee. Meanwhile, Lake Okeechobee—which typically rises and falls seasonally, and is affected by the frequent flooding and droughts associate with the Florida climate—was inundated despite Disston's canals, and the only canal out of the lake that Disston actually completed resulted in the Caloosahatchee River flooding the surrounding area. Furthermore, Disston's planned canals to the east and south out of Lake Okeechobee had not materialized.

The 1887 commission concluded that Disston had received 1,200,000 acres (4,900 km^{2}) which he had not earned. Disston, however, reached a compromise whereby he would keep land that he had been given in return for spending $200,000 to improve drainage including improving the flow of the canals he had already dug. In total, he dug over 80 miles (130 km) of canals and received 1,600,000 acres (6,500 km^{2}) of land under the terms of his first drainage contract of January 1881. Although he never finished his canal plans for Lake Okeechobee, and the Everglades remained relatively unaffected by the structures intended to drain them, he formally was credited with reclaiming large portions of land and generally improving the drainage of peninsular Florida.

Regardless of the lack of success in Disston's canals, the money he paid to the Internal Improvement Fund allowed other industrialists to take an interest in the development of Florida. In the early 1880s, railroad tycoon Henry Morrison Flagler spent a vacation in the town of St. Augustine, a brief distance south of Jacksonville, and, enchanted with it, decided to build an opulent hotel there. He extended the rail line—renaming it the Jacksonville, St. Augustine & Indian River Railway—to Daytona Beach, and then to Palm Beach. As the railroad was built, citrus farms followed, and Flagler constructed hotels down the east coast, envisioning a version of the French Riviera in Florida. A friendly competition developed between Flagler and another railroad magnate named Henry Bradley Plant. While Flagler oversaw the construction of rail lines and hotels along the east coast, Plant concentrated on extending the railroad from Sanford to Tampa, crossing the state and connecting the coasts. At the terminus of this line he built the exquisite Tampa Bay Hotel, opened in 1891.

== Death ==
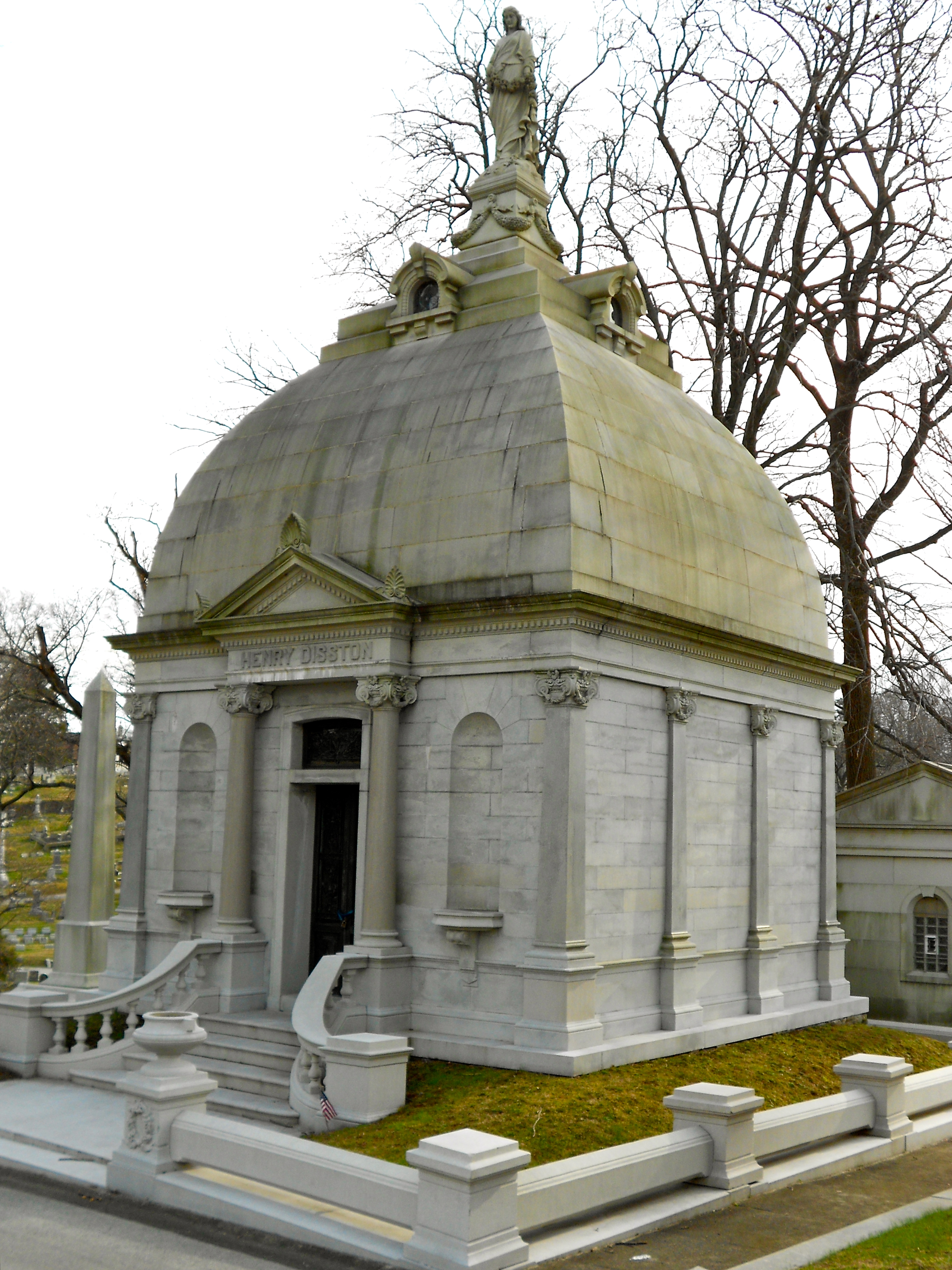
Disston family mausoleum in Laurel Hill Cemetery

Disston himself continued living in Disston City until more bad fortune prompted his return to Philadelphia. The financial Panic of 1893, the Wilson–Gorman Tariff Act of 1894 and two devastating freezes (see Great Freeze for details) caused financial difficulties and he mortgaged his Florida assets for $2 million.

On April 30, 1896, Disston had dinner with the mayor of Philadelphia and attended a theatre production with his wife in Philadelphia. The following morning, he was found dead at age 51. Although some claim that Disston committed suicide in his bathtub with a self-inflicted gunshot to the head, almost every obituary, as well as the official coroner's report, stated that he died of heart disease in bed. The New York Times further reported that, several months before his death, Disston suffered from a bout of typhoid pneumonia.

He was poignantly mourned in Philadelphia as a benevolent employer of over 3,000 and a rare businessman who treated his employees exceptionally well. The Chicago Tribune wrote that he was "peculiar in his ideas. His hand was always in his pocket and his influence always for his less successful fellow-men to whom he took a fancy." He was reported in 1889 to give $17,000 in Christmas gifts to his employees. His philanthropy branched out in other areas as well. In 1882 he sponsored the immigration of approximately 40 or 50 Russian Jewish families and purchased homes for them, assuring they would settle in Pennsylvania.

At the time of his death, Disston's estate was valued at $69,000. He also carried a $1 million life insurance policy, the second largest in the United States. His family had no interest in Florida and creditors foreclosed on his Florida mortgage four years after his death. Henry Flagler's railroad reached a settlement of a little more than 500 people named Miami the year Disston died.

He was interred at Laurel Hill Cemetery in Philadelphia.

== Personal ==
Disston was married with a son and two daughters, all of whom survived him. He was a Presbyterian and a Mason. He was described as a fun-loving socialite as evidenced by a yacht he owned named Mischief. He also was known as a hard-working executive whose gentle facial features were balanced with intense eyes described by one reporter as: "like that of the great eagle in the cage at the Tampa Bay Hotel, that can look straight at the sun without a tear, or even a blink."

== Places named after Disston ==
Several places have been named after Disston in Pennsylvania and Florida such as:

- Disston Heights a neighborhood in St. Petersburg, Florida
- Hamilton Disston School in Philadelphia.
- Hamilton Disston School in Gulfport, Florida.
- Lake Disston in Flagler County, Florida at 29°17′N 81°23′W.
- Lake Disston in St. Petersburg, Florida at 27°46′30″N 82°43′4″W.
- Disston Avenue in Tarpon Springs, Florida at 28°8′8″N 82°44′54″W.
- Disston Avenue in Clermont, Florida at 28°34′28″N 81°45′0″W.
- Disston Avenue in Tavares, Florida at 28°48′27″N 81°43′29″W.
- Disston Street in Philadelphia, Pennsylvania
- Disston Drive in St. Cloud, Florida at 28°16′22″N 81°14′25″W.
- Disston Street in Tallahassee, FL https://maps.google.com/?ll=30.46714,-84.256856&spn=0.49714,0.451813&t=h&z=11
- Disston Canal in Osceola County, Florida
