= Disston Heights =

Neighborhood in St. Petersburg, Florida

Coordinates: 27°47′53″N 82°41′53″W

Disston Heights is a neighborhood in St. Petersburg, Florida. Disston Heights has a population of 18,776 and approximately 29.20% of residents are between the ages of 45 and 64 years old. This is a similar percentage to the city average (29.90%) and that of Pinellas County. The second largest age group in Disston Heights is children and teenagers, with approximately 20.10% of residents younger than 20 years old. Disston Heights is named for Hamilton Disston, who founded Disston City (now Gulfport, Florida).
