= Makinson Island =

Oliver's Island
- Location within Florida
- Etymology: Family name of the most recent owner

Geography
- Location: Lake Tohopekaliga
- Coordinates: 28°14′55″N 81°24′25″W

Administration
- United States of America
- State: Florida
- County: Osceola

Demographics
- Population: 0 (2016)

Additional information
- Official website: Osceola County Parks - Makinson Island

Makinson Island is one of three islands in Lake Tohopekaliga, Osceola County, Florida. It was purchased by the State of Florida on December 31, 1998, in cooperation with the Florida Fish and Wildlife Conservation Commission (FWC), The Trust for Public Land and Osceola County. Ownership was transferred to FWC on October 6, 1999. The park is managed by Osceola County as a natural refuge with trails, primitive camping sites, and a pavilion. The island was planned to be developed into timeshares before it was purchased by the state. The island came with a derelict 34-passenger boat that was restored by Walt Disney World Resort and Mercury Marine and named "Spirit of Osceola".
