= Carolyn Makinson =

British administrator

Carolyn Makinson CBE is the former executive director of International Rescue Committee UK (IRC-UK), and senior vice-president-Europe, IRC, positions she held from September 2010 to June 2014. Prior to these positions, she was executive director of the Women's Refugee Commission (August 2004 to September 2010). She grew up in Derbyshire, England, and has lived at various times in London, Brussels, Cairo, and several places in the US. She now lives in Hastings-on-Hudson, NY, with her husband, Terry Walker.

In 1976, Makinson received a BSc in sociology from the London School of Economics, where she was a Leverhulme Scholar and was awarded the Hobhouse Memorial Prize. She served as a research affiliate for the American University in Cairo from 1984 to 1985. After receiving her PhD in sociology with specialisations in demography and Near Eastern Studies from Princeton University, she worked with Macro International on the Demographic and Health Surveys project as a country monitor for Burundi and Kenya.

From 1988 to 2002, she was responsible for the Andrew W. Mellon Foundation's population and refugee programs, and remained a senior advisor to the foundation until 2006. In 1995, she also studied refugee programs in Rwanda, Guinea and Mozambique as an affiliate of the International Rescue Committee and of Save the Children USA. Prior to helming the Women's Refugee Commission, she was executive director of MIT's Center for International Studies from 2002 to 2004.

Makinson is a member of the Council on Foreign Relations. She was a member of the Roundtable on the Demography of Forced Migration, convened by the Committee on Population of the US National Academy of Sciences, from 1999 to 2004. She served on the Board of Trustees of Marymount Manhattan College from 1999 to 2008 and was a member of the International Rescue Committee's board of trustees in 2004.

She was a visiting lecturer of Public and International Affairs at the Woodrow Wilson School of Princeton University in 1999. Her journal articles, reports and opinion pieces have been published widely in journals such as Family Planning Perspectives, the Journal of Biosocial Science, and the International Journal of Gynecology & Obstetrics.

== Honours and awards ==
Voices of Courage Award, Women's Refugee Commission, 2004.
Harold W. Dodds Honorific Fellowship (Princeton University), 1985–86
Population Council Fellowship for Dissertation Research, 1984–85 and 1986
Princeton University Fellowship, 1981–84
Hobhouse Memorial Prize (London School of Economics), 1976
Leverhulme Scholar (London School of Economics), 1973–76

Makinson was appointed Commander of the Order of the British Empire (CBE) in the 2015 New Year Honours for services to humanitarian relief programmes.

== Selected publications ==
Buscher, D. and C. Makinson. 2006. "The Protection of IDP Women, Children and Youth," Forced Migration Review.

Makinson, C. and Harper, M. 1999. "Pushing the Frontiers of Science–The Mellon Reproductive Biology Centers," International Journal of Gynecology & Obstetrics 67 Suppl. 2 (1999) S101-110.

Makinson, C. 1999. "The Foundation's Program on Refugees and Forced Migration." Andrew W. Mellon Foundation Annual Report, 1999.

Ashford, L. and C. Makinson. 1999. Reproductive Health in Policy and Practice. Population Reference Bureau.

Makinson, C. 1994. "Discrimination against the female child," International Journal of Gynecology & Obstetrics 46 (1994) 119–125.

Makinson, C. 1993. "Estimates of adult mortality in Burundi," Journal of Biosocial Science 25: 169–186.

Makinson, C. 1990. "The Foundation's Program in Population." Andrew W. Mellon Foundation Annual Report, 1990.

Segamba, L., V. Ndikumasabo, C. Makinson, and M. Ayad. 1988. Enquête Démographique et de Santé au Burundi 1987. Institute for Resource Development, Columbia, Maryland.

Makinson, C. 1987. "The Health Consequences of Teenage Fertility," in Mary C. McClellan (ed.), Teenage Pregnancy. Phi Delta Kappa Center on Evaluation, Development and Research.

Makinson, C. 1986. "Sex Differentials in Infant and Child Mortality in Egypt." PhD Dissertation, University Microfilms Inc.

Makinson, C. 1985. "The Health Consequences of Teenage Fertility," Family Planning Perspectives 17: 132–139.
