= Kissimmee River =

River in Florida, United States

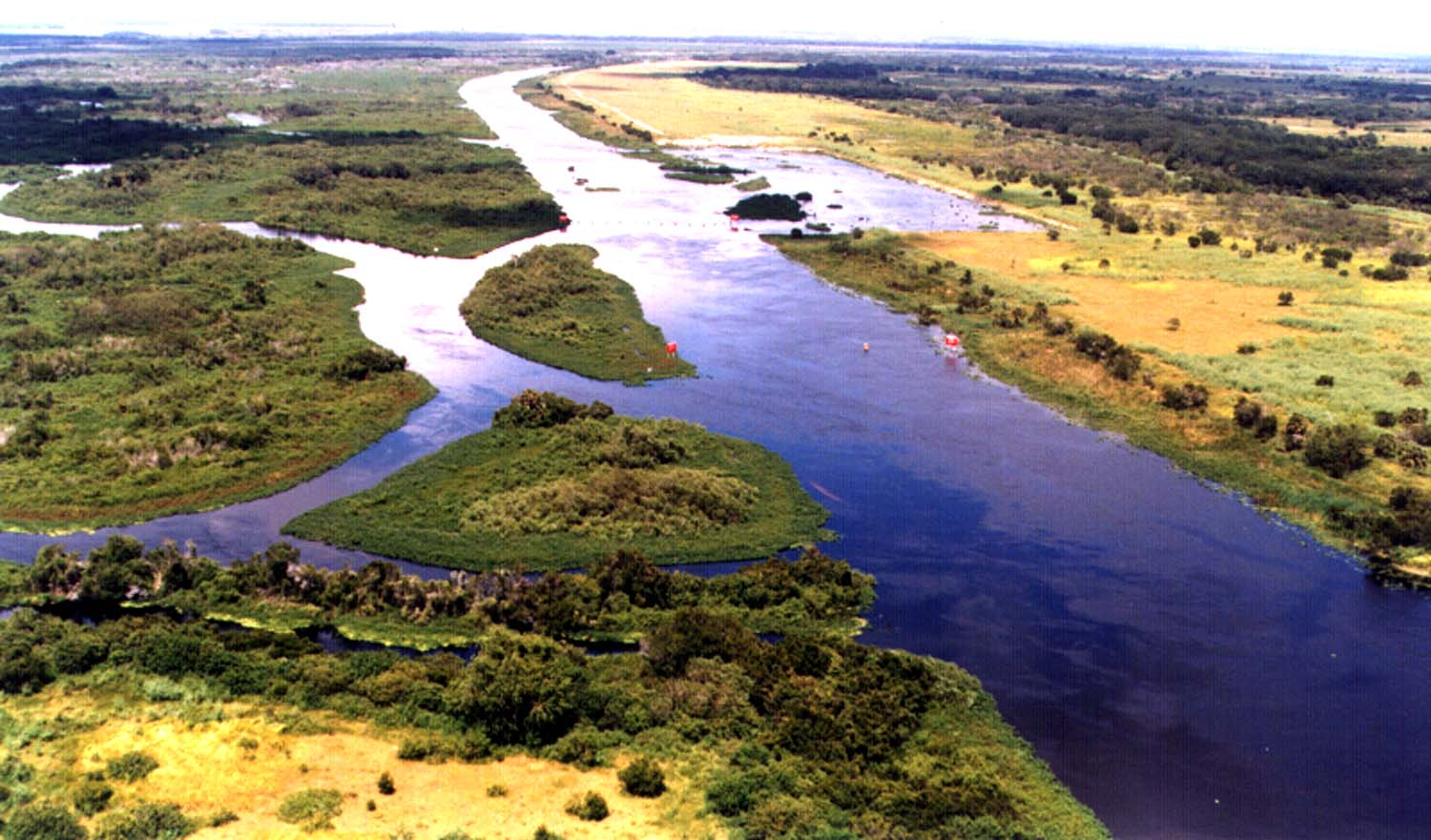
- A stretch of the straightened and channelized Kissimmee River in central Florida

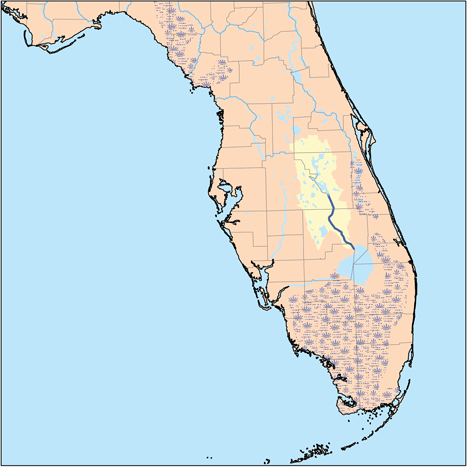
- The Kissimmee River flows south through central Florida into Lake Okeechobee.

Location
- Country: United States
- State: Florida

Physical characteristics
- Source: East Lake Tohopekaliga
  - location: Osceola County, Florida
  - coordinates: 27°59′25″N 81°22′44″W
- Mouth: Lake Okeechobee
  - location: Florida
  - coordinates: 27°8′34″N 80°51′16″W
- Length: 134 mi (216 km)
- Basin size: 3,000 sq mi (7,800 km^{2})

The Kissimmee River is a river in south-central Florida, United States, that forms the north part of the Kissimmee-Okeechobee-Everglades watershed. The river begins at East Lake Tohopekaliga south of Orlando, flowing south through Lake Kissimmee into the large, shallow Lake Okeechobee. Hurricane-related floods in 1947 prompted channelization of the meandering lower stretch, completed by 1970. The straightened course reduced wetland habitat and worsened pollution. In response, efforts since the 1990s have partially restored the river's original state and revitalized the ecosystem, as part of the broader restoration of the Everglades.

== Course ==
The Kissimmee River arises in Osceola County as the outflow from East Lake Tohopekaliga, passing through Lake Tohopekaliga, Lake Cypress, Lake Hatchineha and Lake Kissimmee. Below Lake Kissimmee, the river forms the boundary between Osceola County and Polk County, between Highlands County and Okeechobee County, and between Glades County and Okeechobee County before it flows into Lake Okeechobee. The river was originally 134 miles (216 km) in length, 103 miles (166 km) of which was between Lake Kissimmee and Lake Okeechobee. It forms the headwaters of the Kissimmee River-Lake Okeechobee-Everglades ecosystem.

The Kissimmee River watershed of 3,000 square miles (7,800 km^{2}) is adjacent to the Eastern Continental Divide, with triple watershed points at the Miami (north), Withlacoochee (northwest), and Peace (west) rivers' watersheds and the Lake Okeechobee watershed (southwest). The floodplain of the river supports a diverse community of waterfowl, wading birds, fish, and other wildlife.

== Flood control ==
The 1947 Atlantic hurricane season, which included the 1947 Fort Lauderdale Hurricane and the 1947 October Hurricane, produced very heavy rainfall and flooding over most of central and southern Florida. Florida requested federal assistance in controlling future floods, and in 1954 the United States Congress authorized the canalization of the Kissimmee River. From 1962 to 1970 the United States Army Corps of Engineers dredged the C-38 Canal down the Kissimmee valley, shortening the 103-mile (166 km) distance from Lake Kissimmee to Lake Okeechobee to just 56 miles (90 km). It has since been realized that this project damaged the river, with the faster water flow leading to major environmental problems in the Kissimmee Valley and Lake Okeechobee. Efforts are currently underway to reverse the process and re-introduce the many oxbows in the river that slowed the water.

== Effects of channelization ==
After the river channel was straightened, 40,000 acres (160 km^{2}) of floodplain below Lake Kissimmee dried out, reducing the quality of waterfowl habitat by ninety percent, and the number of herons, egrets and wood storks by two-thirds. Catches of largemouth bass in the river were consistently worse after the channelization. While the Kissimmee was not a significant source of pollution for Lake Okeechobee before channelization, in the 1970s and later the river contributed about 25% of the nitrogen and 20% of the phosphorus flowing into the lake.

== References in popular culture ==
In protest to the canalization of the river and its resultant damage to the habitat, Florida author Piers Anthony based the plot of the tenth Xanth novel, Vale of the Vole, around the straightening of the "Kiss-Mee River," an obvious parody to "Kissimmee."

The river was mentioned in a lyric of Josh Turner's song "Alligator Stroll".

== Restoration ==
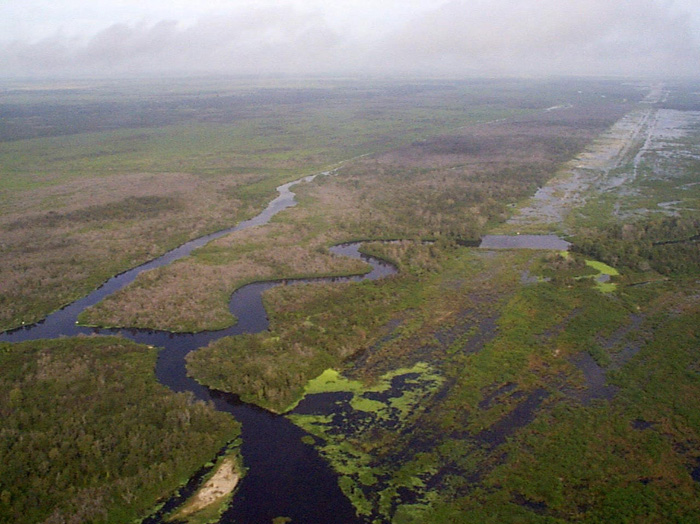
A portion of the C-38 canal, finished in 1971, now backfilled to restore the Kissimmee River floodplain to a more natural state

Efforts to restore the Kissimmee River to its original flow were approved by Congress in 1992, and began with modification to the headwater lakes in 1997. The project was initially estimated to be completed by 2011, but in 2010 the United States Army Corps of Engineers stated it hoped to complete the project in 2015. Restoration was eventually completed in July 2021. In all, about 44 miles (71 km) of the Kissimmee River was restored, plus 20,000 acres of wetlands.

In 2006, the South Florida Water Management District had acquired enough land along the river and in the upper chain of lakes to complete restoration.

A 2009 report from the Corps of Engineers went into detail with the issues and plans for the Kissimmee River restoration.

The restoration project was completed on July 29, 2021. It restored 40 miles (64.3 km) of river and almost 25,000 acres of wetlands. Lake Kissimmee is expected to rise one and a half feet, restoring water sequestration functions and easing seasonal droughts.

Already, wildlife is returning to the restored sections of river. When flooding began again, muck and smothering aquatic weeds were flushed out. Sandbars reemerged. Encroaching dry land trees began dying back. Once-dormant plants began to reestablish themselves. The species included pink-tipped smartweed, horsetail, sedges, rushes, arrowhead, duck potato and pickerel weed. Flooding and continuous flow increased levels of dissolved oxygen in the water, creating near perfect conditions for aquatic invertebrates such as insects, mollusks, works, crayfish and freshwater shrimp. This, in turn, boosted fish populations and it led to a rise in bird and alligator populations. The entire food chain benefitted. This is one reason that the Kissimmee River restoration is considered to be the largest true ecosystem restoration project in the world, attracting ecologists from other states and countries.
