= St. Cloud station (Florida) =

United States historic place in Florida

- St. Cloud Depot
- U.S. National Register of Historic Places
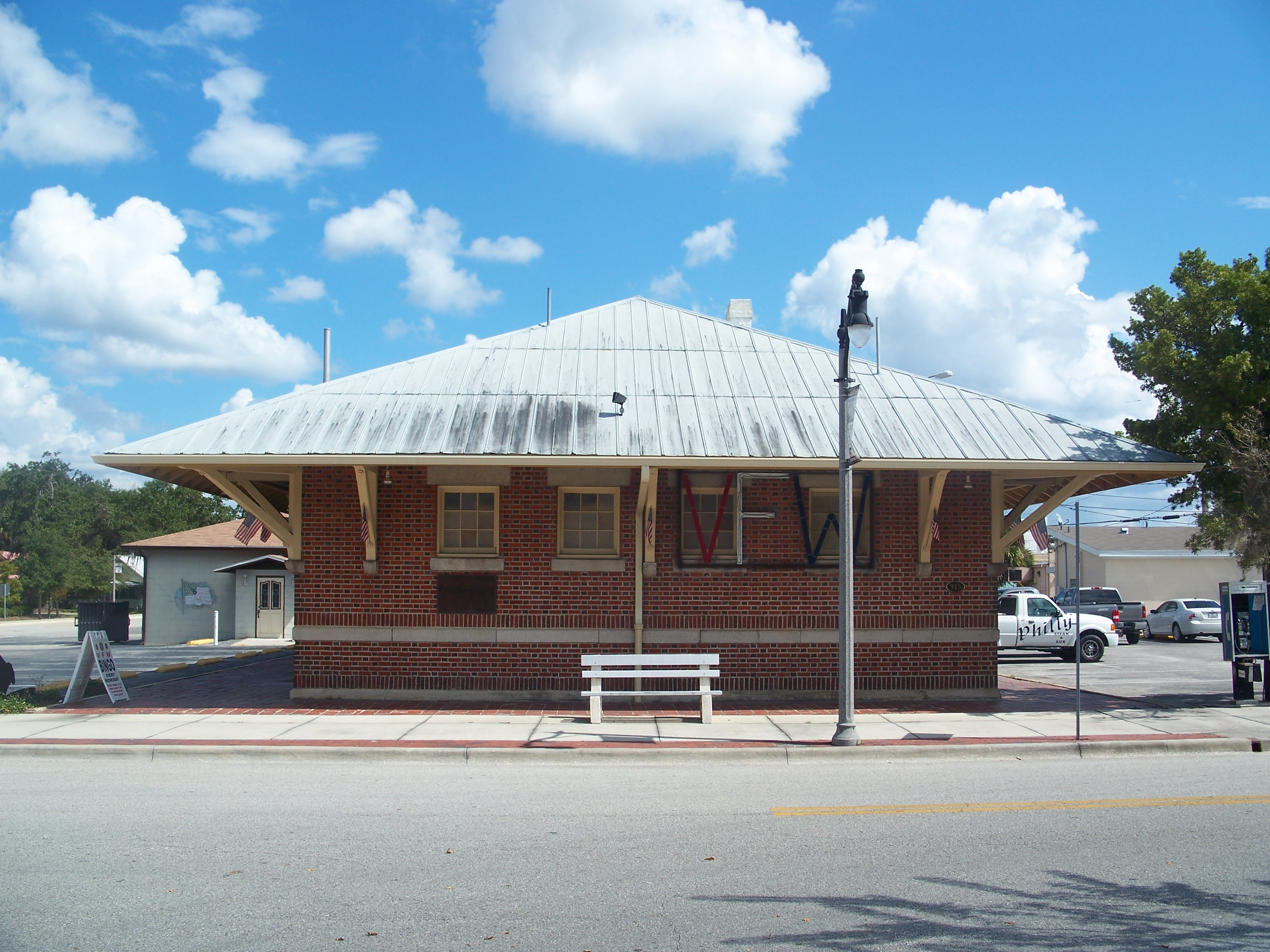

- Location within Florida Location within the United States
- Location: St. Cloud, Florida
- Coordinates: 28°14′57″N 81°17′01″W
- Built: 1917–1918
- NRHP reference No.: 100009031
- Added to NRHP: July 31, 2018

St. Cloud Depot is a former railway station in St. Cloud, Florida. After the original c. 1910 station building failed to placate demand, the city petitioned for a new station be built on the site. The old building was moved north of the tracks and continued use as the local freight depot; the new passenger station was opened in May 1918. Passenger service ceased and the line was abandoned by the 1930s. The Veterans of Foreign Wars had taken over the building by 1943.

The station was added to the National Register of Historic Places on July 31, 2018.

Preceding station	Atlantic Coast Line Railroad	Following station
Deeson toward Kissimmee	Kissimmee – St. Cloud	Terminus
