= Lake Tohopekaliga =

Lake in the state of Florida, United States

- Tohopke likv (Creek)
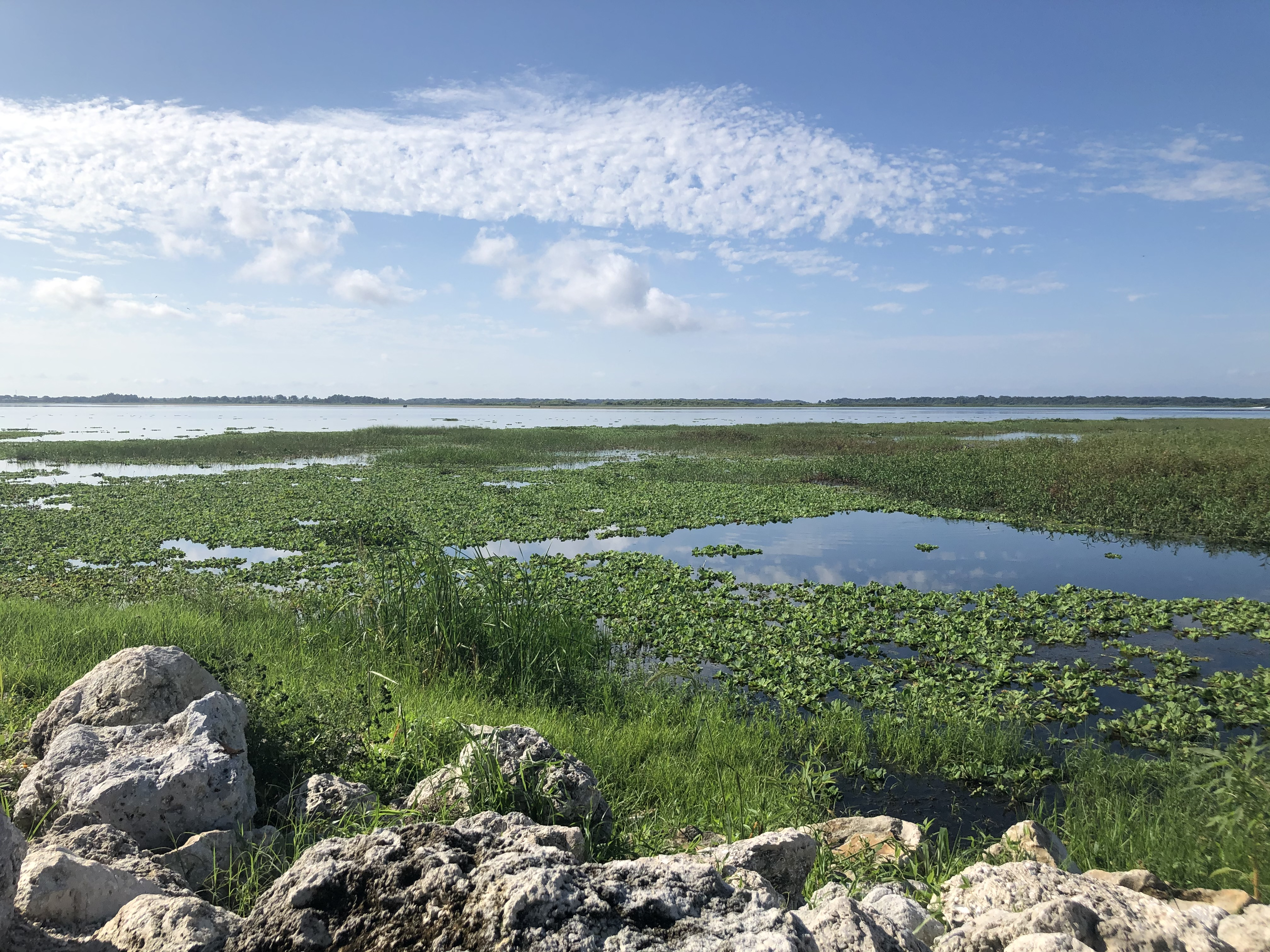
- Lake Tohopekaliga south of St. Cloud

- Location within Florida Location within the United States
- Location: Osceola County, Florida
- Coordinates: 28°10′8″N 81°23′24″W
- Primary inflows: Shingle Creek, St. Cloud canal of Kissimmee River
- Primary outflows: South-port canal of Kissimmee River
- Basin countries: United States
- Surface area: 22,700 acres (91.86 km^{2})
- Islands: Makinson Island; Paradise Island

Lake Tohopekaliga
- Location within the United States
- Location: Osceola County, Florida, United States
- Nearest city: Kissimmee, Florida
- Coordinates: 28°10′08″N 81°23′24″W
- Area: 22,700 acres (91.86 km^{2})

Lake Tohopekaliga, Tohopeka (from tohopke /(i)to-hó:pk-i/ meaning fence, fort); Tohopekaliga (from tohopke /(i)to-hó:pk-i/ meaning fence, fort + likv /léyk-a/ meaning site), also referred to as Lake Toho, West Lake, or simply Toho, is the largest lake in Osceola County, Florida, United States. Its primary inflow is Shingle Creek, which rises in Orlando. It covers 22,700 acres (91.86 km^{2}), and spans 42 miles (68 km) in circumference. It is linked to East Lake Tohopekaliga by Canal 31 (St. Cloud Canal). The canal is 3 miles (5 km) long and runs through western St. Cloud. South Port canal is located at the southern tip of the lake and links it to Cypress Lake. It is 4 miles (6 km) long. Lake Toho is bordered on the northern shore by Kissimmee, on the eastern shore by Kissimmee Park, and South Port on the southern shore. Lake Tohopekaliga is known for its bass fishing and birdwatching. Lakefront Park is located at the North end of the lake and borders Lakeshore Blvd. Lakefront Park has a scenic walking path with benches where visitors may view the area's wide array of waterfowl, alligators, turtles and others. Lakefront park also has a miniature lighthouse, a children's playground area, and is bordered on its west end by Big Toho Marina.

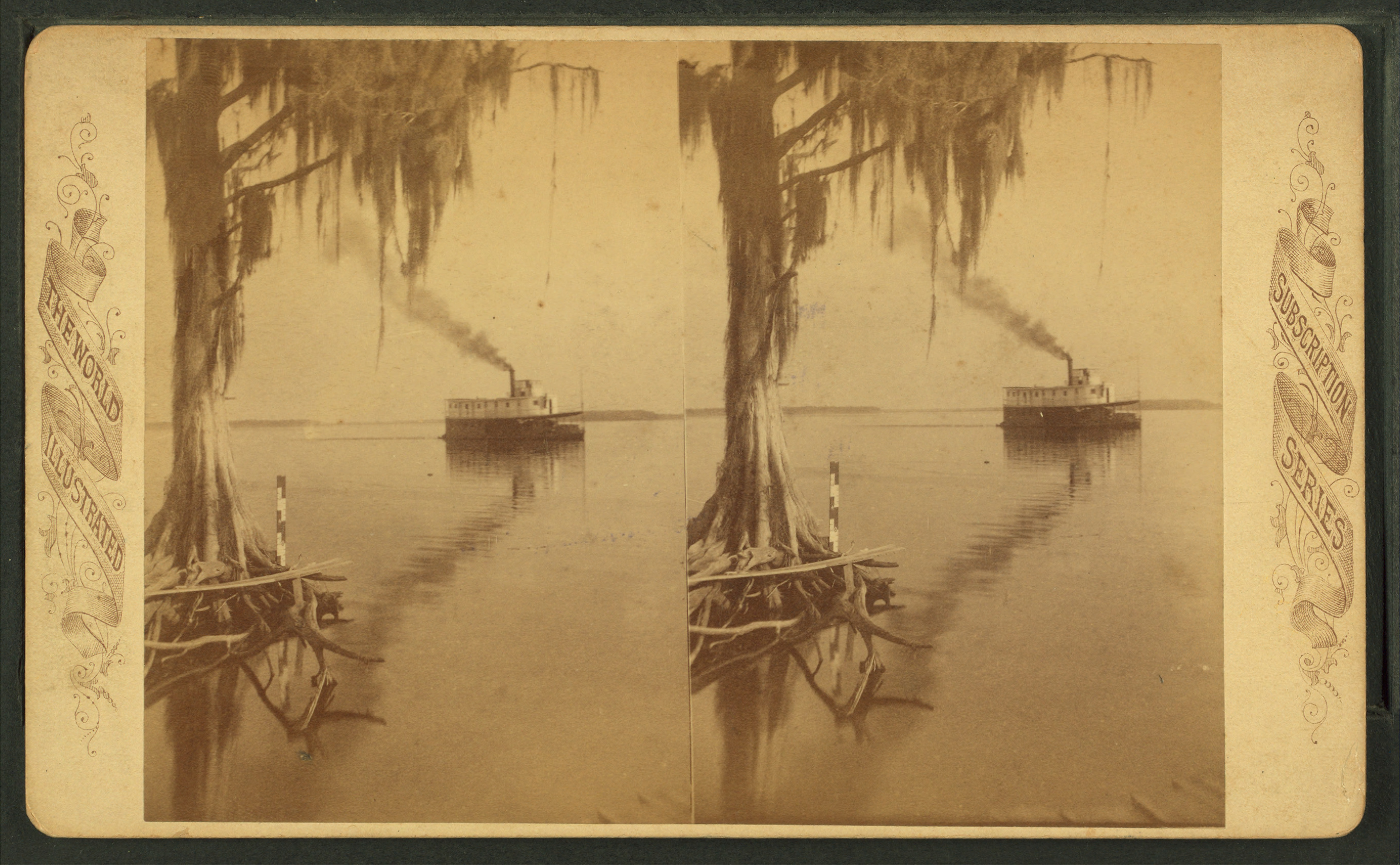
Late 19th-century stereoscopic view of Lake Tohopekaliga.

== See also ==
- East Lake Tohopekaliga
- Kissimmee, Florida
