= St. Cloud, Florida =

- City
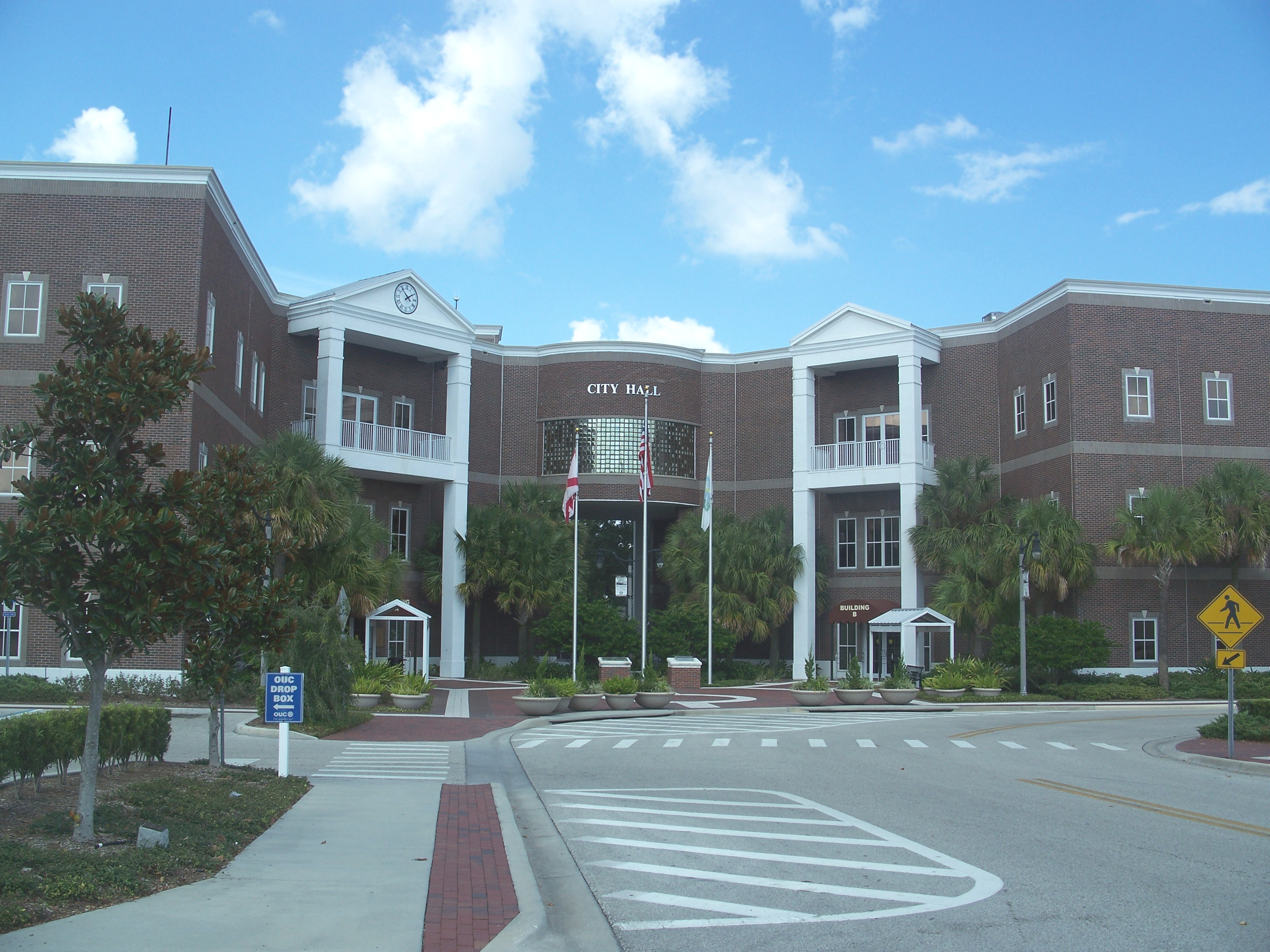
- St. Cloud City Hall

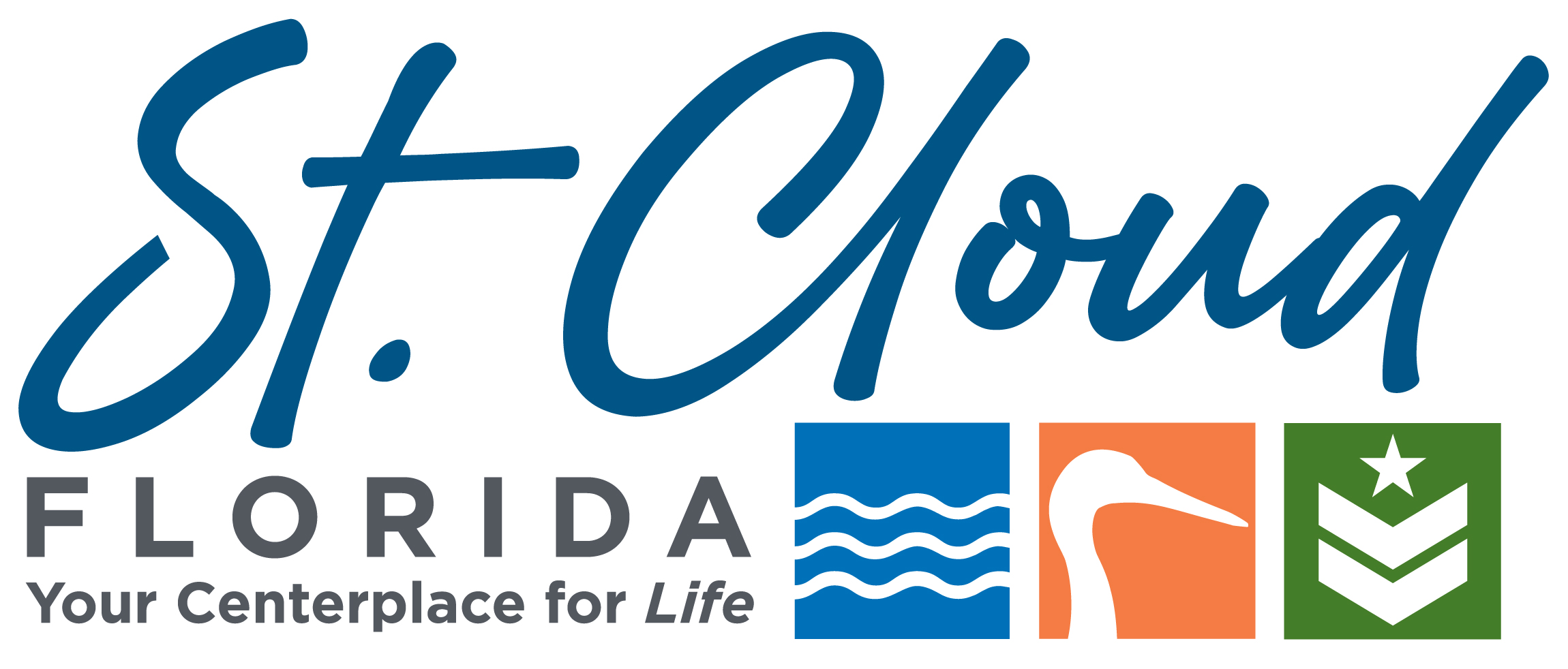
- City logo
- Nickname: The Friendly Soldier City
- Motto: Your Centerplace for Life
- Interactive map of St. Cloud, Florida
- Location within Florida
- Coordinates: 28.2288°N 81.2846°W
- Country: United States
- State: Florida
- County: Osceola
- Founded: April 16, 1909
- Incorporated: January 3, 1911
- Named for: St. Cloud, Minnesota via Saint-Cloud, France

Government
  - Type: Council–Manager
  - Mayor: Chris Robertson
  - Deputy mayor: Ken Gilbert
  - City manager: Veronica Miller
  - Councilmembers: Jennifer A. Paul; Kolby Urban; Shawn Fletcher

Area
  - City: 35.019 sq mi (90.699 km^{2})
  - Land: 34.916 sq mi (90.433 km^{2})
  - Water: 0.103 sq mi (0.267 km^{2}) 0.29%
- Elevation: 69 ft (21 m)

Population (2020)
  - City: 58,964
  - Estimate (2025): 74,960
  - Rank: US: 518th FL: 40th
  - Density: 1,688.7/sq mi (652.02/km^{2})
  - Urban: 418,404 (US: 100th)
  - Metro: 2,957,672 (US: 20th)
- Time zone: UTC–5 (Eastern (EST))
  - Summer (DST): UTC–4 (EDT)
- ZIP Codes: 34769, 34770, 34771, 34772, 34773
- Area codes: 321, 407, and 689
- FIPS code: 12-62625
- GNIS feature ID: 2405392
- Website: stcloudfl.gov

St. Cloud or Saint Cloud is a city in northern Osceola County, Florida, United States. It is on the southern shore of East Lake Tohopekaliga in Central Florida, about 26 miles (41.8 km) southeast of Orlando. The population was 58,964 as of the 2020 census, and was estimated at 74,960 in 2025. The city is part of the Orlando–Kissimmee–Sanford metropolitan area.

St. Cloud was founded as a retirement community for Union army veterans of the Civil War, and gained the nickname "The Friendly Soldier City."

== History ==
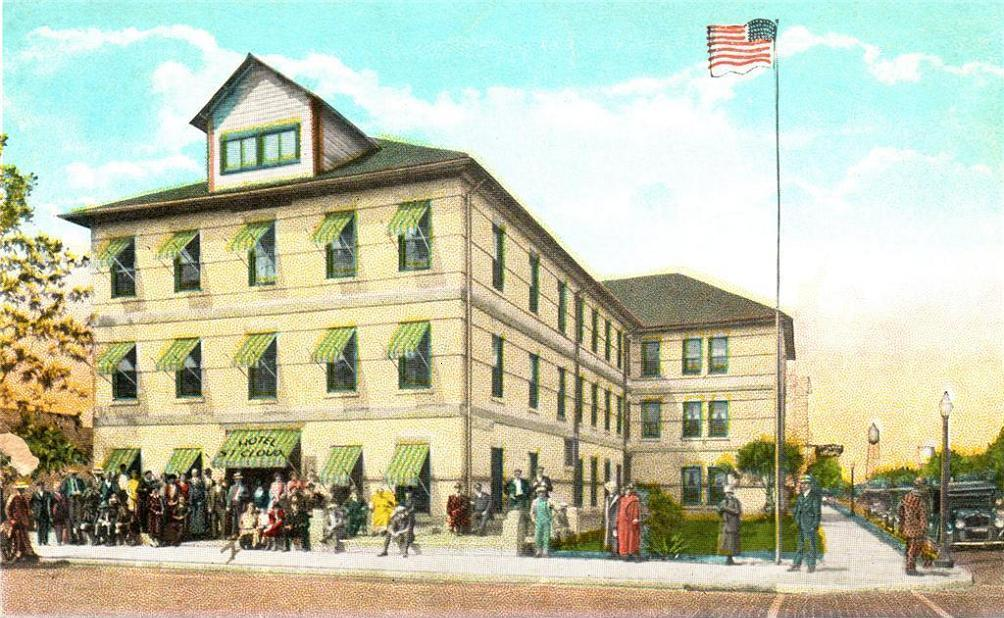
St. Cloud Hotel c. 1922

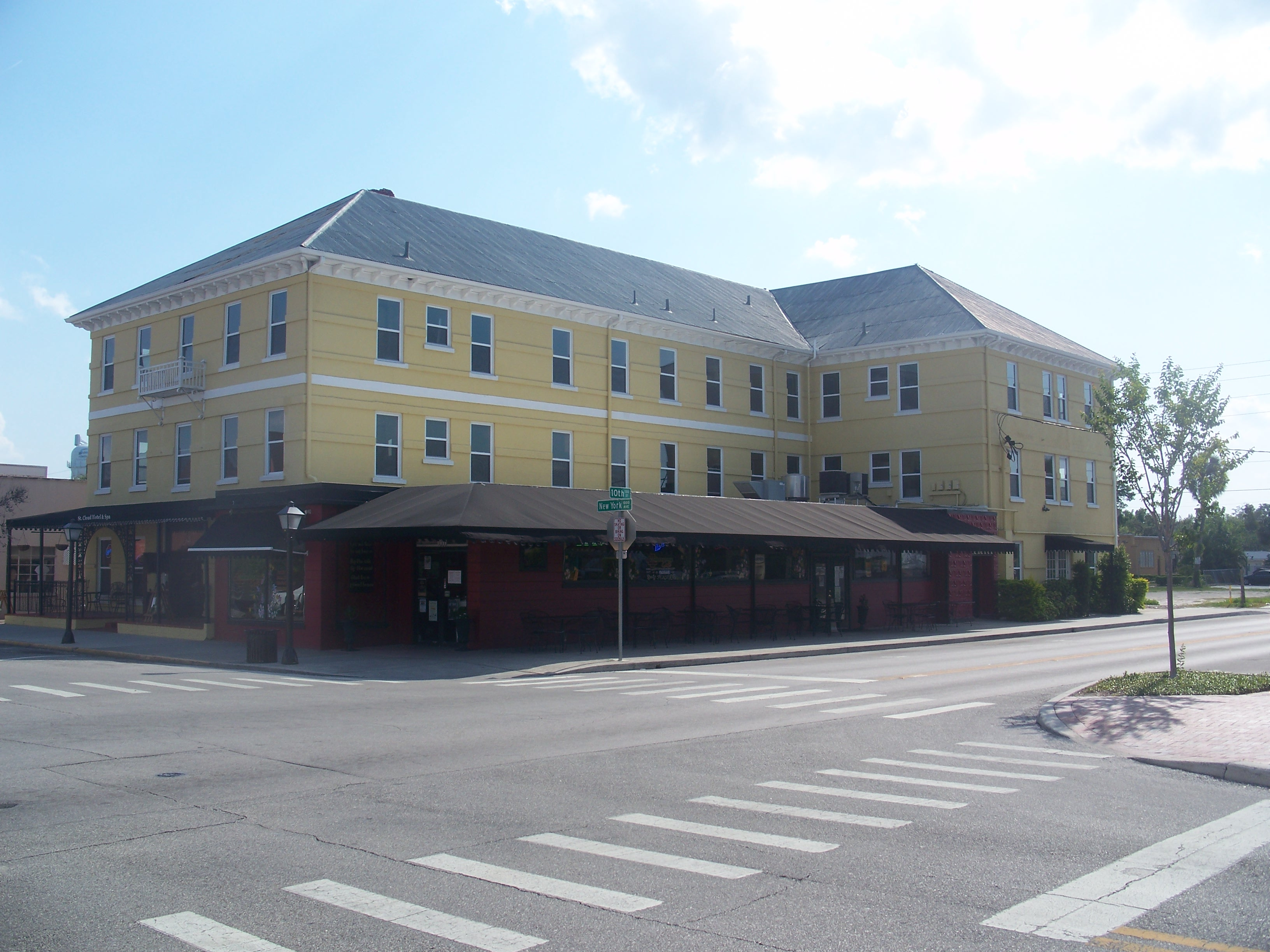
St. Cloud Hotel, 2011

During the 1870s, Hamilton Disston of Philadelphia took an interest in developing the region while on fishing trips with Henry Shelton Sanford, founder of the city of Sanford. Disston contracted with the Florida Internal Improvement Fund, then in receivership, to pay $1 million to offset its Civil War and Reconstruction debt. In exchange, Disston was awarded half the land he drained from the state's swamps. He dug canals and, in 1886–1887, established St. Cloud sugarcane plantation, named after St. Cloud, Minnesota.

Disston opened the Sugar Belt Railway to the South Florida Railroad in 1888 to carry his product to market. But the Panic of 1893 dropped land values, and the Great Freeze of 1894–1895 ruined the plantation. Disston returned to Philadelphia, where he died in 1896. The Sugar Belt Railway merged into the South Florida Railroad. An attempt to cultivate rice in the area failed, and for several years the land remained fallow. Then in 1909, the Seminole Land & Investment Company acquired 35,000 acres (14,000 ha) as the site for a Grand Army of the Republic veterans' colony. St. Cloud was selected because of its "health, climate and productiveness of soil." It was first permanently settled in 1909 by William G. King, a real estate manager from Alachua County who had been given the responsibility "to plan, locate and develop a town."

On April 16, 1909, the Kissimmee Valley Gazette announced the "New Town of St. Cloud," a "Soldiers Colony" near Kissimmee. The newspaper called the Seminole Land and Investment Company's purchase "one of the most important real estate deals ever made in the State of Florida." It was reported that the company had searched all over Florida for the perfect site for a veterans' colony, particularly one suited for "health, climate, and productiveness of the soil." It is believed that many of the streets were named for states from which the Civil War veterans had served, but the street names were already assigned to the platted land before settlement occurred. Due to the large number of veterans buried in Mt. Peace Cemetery, the latter has been called "one of the largest non-battlefield Union cemeteries south of the Mason–Dixon line."

Early St. Cloud had a history as a sundown town with a plot of land outside the city reserved for black residents officially dubbed "Colored Quarter." This name is still active on official land records as the title of this section of land. Early newspaper records support the history of being a "Sundown Town" with firsthand accounts of local residents making attempts "to keep the colored folks in their own quarters outside the town."

On June 1, 1915, the Florida Legislature incorporated St. Cloud as a city. Its downtown features landmark buildings by the Orlando architectural firm Ryan and Roberts, a partnership consisting of two women. The buildings by Ryan and Roberts and others downtown are predominantly Spanish Revival.

St. Cloud has tried to separate itself from neighboring cities, and particularly the theme parks, by promoting an image of small-town life, and by attempting to make itself economically less dependent on Kissimmee. On March 6, 2006, St. Cloud introduced the CyberSpot program, becoming the first city in the United States to give residents free high-speed wireless Internet access. The program ended in 2009.

=== Water tower cross controversy ===
In the late 1960s, the city of St. Cloud was gifted a Latin cross during the Christmas season. The twelve-foot tall cross, which was illuminated at night, stood atop the city’s water tower off U.S. Route 192 for nearly twenty years without issue.

By November 1986, the American Civil Liberties Union (ACLU) filed its first lawsuit against the city of St. Cloud to have the cross removed. Four months later, in March 1987, private citizen Ronald Mendelson filed a similar lawsuit that the cross violated the U.S. Constitution’s mandate of separation of church and state. Mendelson, a Jewish resident who lived east of St. Cloud, decided to sue because of the city’s implicit endorsement of Christianity atop the water tower and the inconvenience Mendelson felt due to the "shadow of the cross." In defense of its presence, residents cited the cross as a local landmark and directional marker for boaters, drivers, and pilots commuting within St. Cloud.

On August 16, 1989, a U.S. District judge ruled in favor of Mendelson to have the Latin cross removed off the water tower. The judge, however, suggested in his ruling that the city replace the Latin cross with a Greek cross, distinguished for representing a plus-sign, to identify St. Cloud as a crossroad city. The ACLU quickly filed an additional lawsuit, claiming that the new Greek cross still violated the U.S. Constitution in an attempt to evade the judge's original ruling.

Eventually, the city of St. Cloud agreed to remove the cross in 1990, primarily due to the mounting legal costs incurred by the ACLU. Local support through the city council to reinstate the Latin cross on private property within St. Cloud was proposed. Ultimately, those discussions fell through due to the 35-foot height restriction that the cross would have exceeded on a structure within city limits.

The original Latin cross has since been moved atop a 60-foot tower on private property in nearby Intercession City, where it has remained since 1995.

== Geography ==
According to the United States Census Bureau, the city has an area of 35.019 square miles (90.70 km^{2}), of which 34.916 square miles (90.43 km^{2}) is land and 0.103 square miles (0.27 km^{2}) (0.29%) is water.

St. Cloud is on the southern shore of East Lake Tohopekaliga, an exceptionally clear lake, with good visibility to depths of 7 to 9 feet (2.1 to 2.7 m). East Lake is nearly circular in shape and covers approximately 12,000 acres (49 km^{2}).

The major highway is U.S. Route 192 running in tandem with U.S. Route 441 east and west. This six-lane road is intersected by avenues running north and south. Many have names of US states in no particular order.

Florida's Turnpike has an intersection in St. cloud at Clay Whaley, however that is soon to change to a new Diverging Diamond Interchange at Nolte. Currently the Clay Whaley Intersection only supports Orlando traffic.

St. Cloud also has Osceola County roads 523 (Canoe Creek) 534 (Hickory Tree Rd) 532 (Nova Rd) and 525 (Kissimmee Park Rd)

== Climate ==
The climate in this area is characterized by hot, humid summers and generally mild winters. According to the Köppen climate classification, the City of St. Cloud has a humid subtropical climate zone (Cfa).

== Demographics ==
Historical population
Census	Pop.	Note	%±
1920	2,011		—
1930	1,863		−7.4%
1940	2,042		9.6%
1950	3,001		47.0%
1960	4,353		45.1%
1970	5,041		15.8%
1980	7,840		55.5%
1990	12,453		58.8%
2000	20,074		61.2%
2010	35,183		75.3%
2020	58,964		67.6%
2025 (est.)	74,960		27.1%
U.S. Decennial Census; 2020 Census

According to realtor website Zillow, the average price of a home as of August 31, 2026, in Saint Cloud was $389,676.

As of the 2024 American Community Survey, there were 23,092 estimated households in St. Cloud with an average of 3.05 persons per household. The city has a median household income of $95,990. Approximately 10.8% of the city's population lives at or below the poverty line. St. Cloud has an estimated 68.6% employment rate, with 34.3% of the population holding a bachelor's degree or higher and 88.3% holding a high school diploma. There were 24,743 housing units at an average density of 708.64 per square mile (273.61/km^{2}).

The median age in the city was 35.0 years.

St. Cloud, Florida – racial and ethnic composition Note: the US Census treats Hispanic/Latino as an ethnic category. This table excludes Latinos from the racial categories and assigns them to a separate category. Hispanics/Latinos may be of any race.
Race / ethnicity (NH = non-Hispanic)	Pop. 1980	Pop. 1990	Pop. 2000	Pop. 2010	Pop. 2020
White alone (NH)	7,658 (97.68%)	11,737 (94.25%)	16,513 (82.26%)	21,851 (62.11%)	23,799 (40.36%)
Black or African American alone (NH)	26 (0.33%)	119 (0.96%)	319 (1.59%)	1,633 (4.64%)	3,392 (5.75%)
Native American or Alaska Native alone (NH)	—	50 (0.40%)	75 (0.37%)	79 (0.22%)	100 (0.17%)
Asian alone (NH)	—	64 (0.51%)	186 (0.93%)	580 (1.65%)	1,111 (1.88%)
Pacific Islander alone (NH)	—	—	9 (0.04%)	21 (0.06%)	51 (0.09%)
Other race alone (NH)	44 (0.56%)	1 (0.01%)	32 (0.16%)	143 (0.41%)	393 (0.67%)
Mixed race or multiracial (NH)	—	—	259 (1.29%)	596 (1.69%)	2,038 (3.46%)
Hispanic or Latino (any race)	112 (1.43%)	482 (3.87%)	2,681 (13.36%)	10,280 (29.22%)	28,080 (47.62%)
Total	7,840 (100.00%)	12,453 (100.00%)	20,074 (100.00%)	35,183 (100.00%)	58,964 (100.00%)

=== 2020 census ===
As of the 2020 census, there were 58,964 people, 19,976 households, and 15,240 families residing in the city. The population density was 2,316.86 inhabitants per square mile (894.54/km^{2}). There were 21,347 housing units at an average density of 838.78 per square mile (323.85/km^{2}). The racial makeup of the city was 51.36% White, 6.95% African American, 0.48% Native American, 1.98% Asian, 0.10% Pacific Islander, 15.24% from some other races and 23.88% from two or more races. Hispanic or Latino people of any race were 47.62% of the population.

=== 2010 census ===
As of the 2010 census, there were 35,183 people, 12,565 households, and 9,145 families residing in the city. The population density was 1,981.25 inhabitants per square mile (764.96/km^{2}). There were 14,544 housing units at an average density of 819.01 per square mile (316.22/km^{2}). The racial makeup of the city was 82.43% White, 5.83% African American, 0.38% Native American, 1.74% Asian, 0.07% Pacific Islander, 6.14% from some other races and 3.41% from two or more races. Hispanic or Latino people of any race were 29.22% of the population.

=== 2000 census ===
As of the 2000 census, there were 20,074 people, 6,716 households, and 5,424 families residing in the city. The population density was 2,190.77 inhabitants per square mile (845.86/km^{2}). There were 8,602 housing units at an average density of 938.78 per square mile (362.46/km^{2}). The racial makeup of the city was 90.27% White, 2.07% African American, 0.47% Native American, 0.95% Asian, 0.07% Pacific Islander, 4.10% from some other races and 2.06% from two or more races. Hispanic or Latino people of any race were 13.36% of the population.

There were 7,716 households out of which 34.0% had children under the age of 18 living with them, 52.8% were married couples living together, 12.8% had a female householder with no husband present, and 29.7% were non-families. 23.7% of all households were made up of individuals and 11.9% had someone living alone who was 65 years of age or older. The average household size was 2.55 and the average family size was 3.00.

In the city the population was spread out with 25.5% under the age of 18, 7.7% from 18 to 24, 29.7% from 25 to 44, 19.7% from 45 to 64, and 17.4% who were 65 years of age or older. The median age was 37 years. For every 100 females there were 90.8 males. For every 100 females age 18 and over, there were 85.4 males.

The median income for a household in the city was $36,467, and the median income for a family was $41,211. Males had a median income of $30,955 versus $22,414 for females. The per capita income for the city was $17,031. 8.1% of the population and 6.2% of families were below the poverty line. Out of the total people living in poverty, 8.7% were under the age of 18 and 8.3% were 65 or older.

== Education ==
All of the public schools in St. Cloud are served by the School District of Osceola County, Florida.

Elementary Schools

- Canoe Creek K–8 (formerly Canoe Creek Charter)
- Harmony Elementary School (HCES)
- Hickory Tree Elementary School (HTE)
- Lakeview Elementary School (LVES)
- Michigan Avenue Elementary School (MES)
- Narcoossee Elementary School (NCES)
- Neptune Elementary School
- St. Cloud Elementary School (SCES)

Middle Schools

- Harmony Middle School (HCMS)
- Narcoossee Middle School (NCMS)
- Neptune Middle School (NMS)
- St. Cloud Middle School (SCMS)

High Schools

- Harmony High School (HHS) (Although HHS is not within the city limits (about 15 miles east), students in the eastern part of city limits along with 1/3 of the south portion of the city attend this school)
- Saint Cloud High School (SCHS)

Parochial Schools

- St. Thomas Aquinas Catholic School (Pre-K–8)

Charter Schools

- American Classical Charter Academy (K–8) (closed as of 2022)
- BridgePrep Academy (K–8)
- Creative Inspiration Journey School (K–5)
- Mater Academy (K–8)
- St. Cloud Preparatory Academy (K–9) (closed as of 2022)

Private Schools

- City Of Life Christian Academy (Pre-K–12)
- St. Cloud Christian Preparatory School (K–12)

== Public library ==
The Veteran's Memorial St. Cloud Library is a branch library is in a remodeled SunTrust Bank, five blocks away from historic downtown St. Cloud.

=== History of Veterans Memorial Library ===
The first form of a library in St. Cloud was in 1910, when the new woman's club set up a traveling library and a table at the train station with reading materials for locals. By 1911, there was a reading room that was purchased on Pennsylvania Avenue that the ladies of the town worked to make comfortable and stocked with things to read. Within the next couple of years the collection had outgrown the reading room and moved to the People's Bank and then City Hall. In 1915, the town began fundraising to build a proper building. These efforts were put on hold temporarily while war efforts were made a priority. When 1922 rolled around, it was decided that there was enough money to pay an architect to begin planning and building. The contract price was for $4,506.20. The building was extremely well-built and designed with many updated features, including electricity. On February 17, 1923, the new library was dedicated and named "Veteran's Memorial Library" which remains today.

From 1923 to 1968, Veteran's Memorial Library was operated and taken care of by the Woman's Club of St. Cloud. In 1968 it officially became part of the Osceola County Library System. From 1972 to 1974, the location of the library collection moved into a former bank on the corner of New York Avenue and 10th Street. At this point, the original building became a thrift store to benefit the Red Cross and other groups. In 2001, the building was purchased by The City of St. Cloud, and with the help of other organizations was planned to become a museum. The grand opening of The St. Cloud Heritage Museum was held on February 17, 2005.

While the St. Cloud Heritage Museum still proudly boasts the name "Veteran's Memorial Library," the branch location was moved to a former SunTrust bank building on 13th Street and Indiana Avenue in 1995, where it still operates today as part of the Osceola County Library System.

== Sites of interest ==
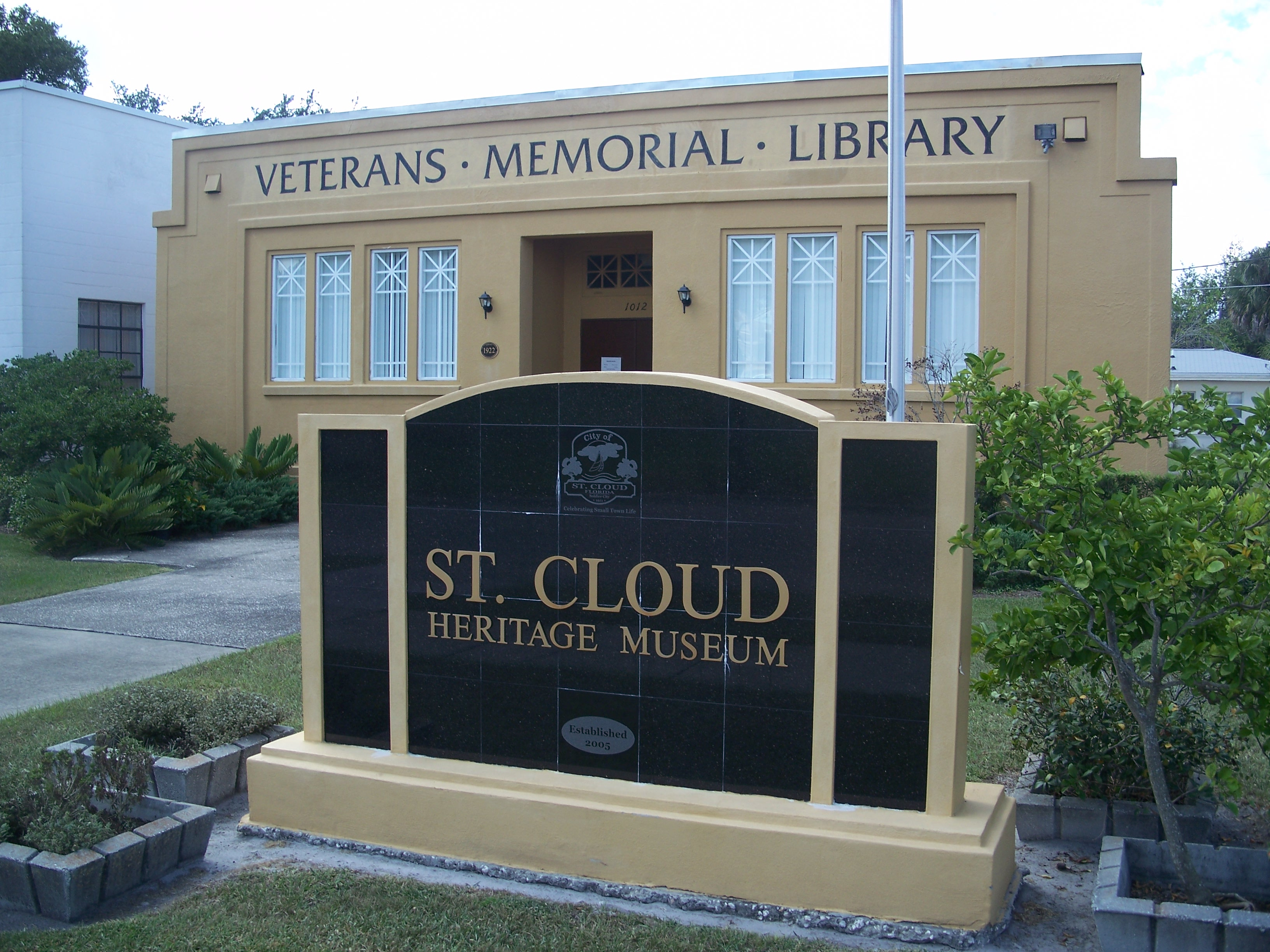
St. Cloud Heritage Museum

- Lakefront Park
- Reptile World Serpentarium
- St. Cloud Depot
- St. Cloud Heritage Museum
- Theatre in the Cloud
- St. Cloud Twin Theatre
- Wild Florida

== Notable people ==
- Adam the Woo, YouTube travel vlogger
- Dave Cianelli, former National Football League (NFL) football player and former lobbyist
- Brent Fullwood, former NFL football player
- Tyler Gonzalez, racing driver
- Jesse Neal, Professional Wrestler/Former TNA Superstar/USS Cole Veteran survivor
- Sam Riggs, country music singer-songwriter
- The Supervillains, five-piece ska band

== In popular media ==
=== Music ===
- The album Saint Cloud (2020), by Waxahatchee gets its name from the city.
- The Sixty-Sixty music video by the band A New Violet, was filmed and recorded in parts of St. Cloud, FL.

=== Play (and film) based in St. Cloud ===
- Sweet Bird of Youth (1959), by Tennessee Williams

=== Films shot in St. Cloud ===
- Two Thousand Maniacs! (1964), directed by Herschell Gordon Lewis, starring Connie Mason and William Kerwin
- Barracuda (1978), starring Wayne Crawford, Jason Evers, and William Kerwin
- The Waterboy (1998), starring Adam Sandler, Henry Winkler, and Kathy Bates

== Notes ==
- Romer, Jean-Claude (2000). "A Bloody New Wave in the United States (July 1964)". Horror Film Reader. New York: Limelight Editions. ISBN 0-87910-297-7.
