= East Lake Tohopekaliga =

Lake in the state of Florida, United States

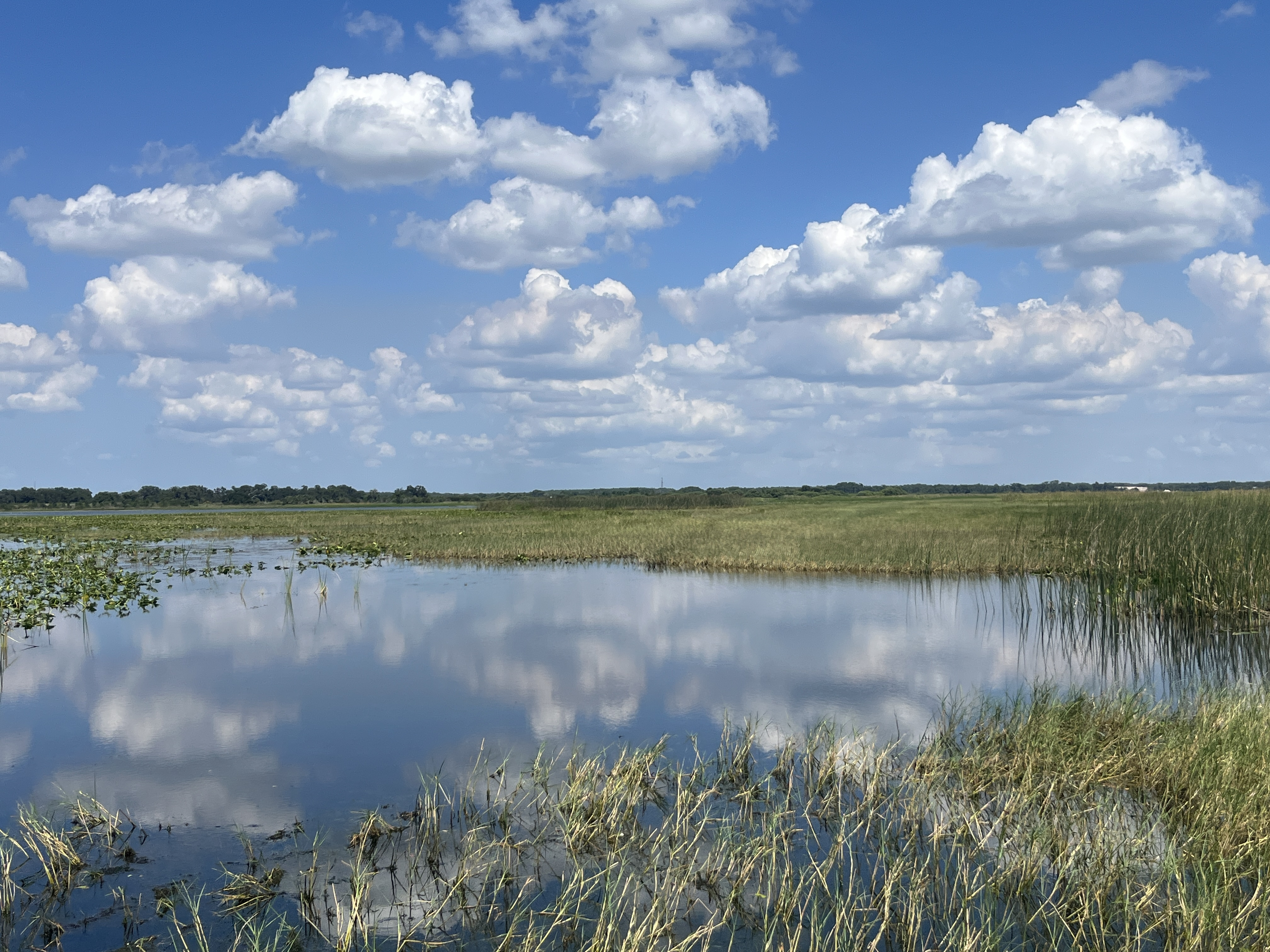

- Location within Florida Location within the United States
- Location: Osceola County, Florida
- Coordinates: 28°17′50″N 81°16′53″W
- Primary inflows: Boggy Creek
- Basin countries: United States
- Surface area: 11,968 acres (4,843 ha)
- Max. depth: ~18 ft (5.5 m)
- Settlements: St. Cloud, Narcoossee, Runnymede

East Lake Tohopekaliga (East Lake Toho for short) is a lake in Osceola County, Florida, United States. It is the primary inflow of Boggy Creek, which rises in the Orlando International Airport at 70 feet (21 m) above sea level. Three places surround the lake, they are St. Cloud on the south shore, and Narcoossee and Runnymede on the east shore.

The lake covers an area of 11,968 acres (48.43 km^{2}) and is almost 5 miles (8.0 km) in diameter (about the diameter of Blue Cypress Lake in Indian River County, 50 miles (80 km) to the southeast), making it the 2nd largest lake in Osceola County, after Lake Tohopekaliga, which is linked by Canal 31 (St. Cloud Canal).

== See also ==
- Lake Tohopekaliga
- Narcoossee
