= NIB =

NIB, nib or NiB may refer to:

- Nib (pen), the writing tip of a pen
- Saw nib, a small protrusion on the back of antique saws
- The Nib, an online comic
- Nib, partially processed cocoa bean
- Twizzlers Nibs, a candy
- Neodymium magnet or NIB (neodymium, iron, boron)
- "N.I.B.", a song by Black Sabbath
- .nib, Apple Interface Builder file format
- Net insurance benefit
- NiB, nickel boron, an electroless nickel alloy

In companies and organizations:

- National Irish Bank
- National Intercollegiate Band
- Nordic Investment Bank
- North Irish Brigade
- nib Health Funds, Australasia
- New Iberia (Amtrak station), Louisiana, US, station code
- National Internet Backbone NIB-II, the BSNL internet backbone
- Nagasaki International Television, Japan
- National Intelligence Bureau
