= Hamilton Disston School =

- U.S. National Register of Historic Places
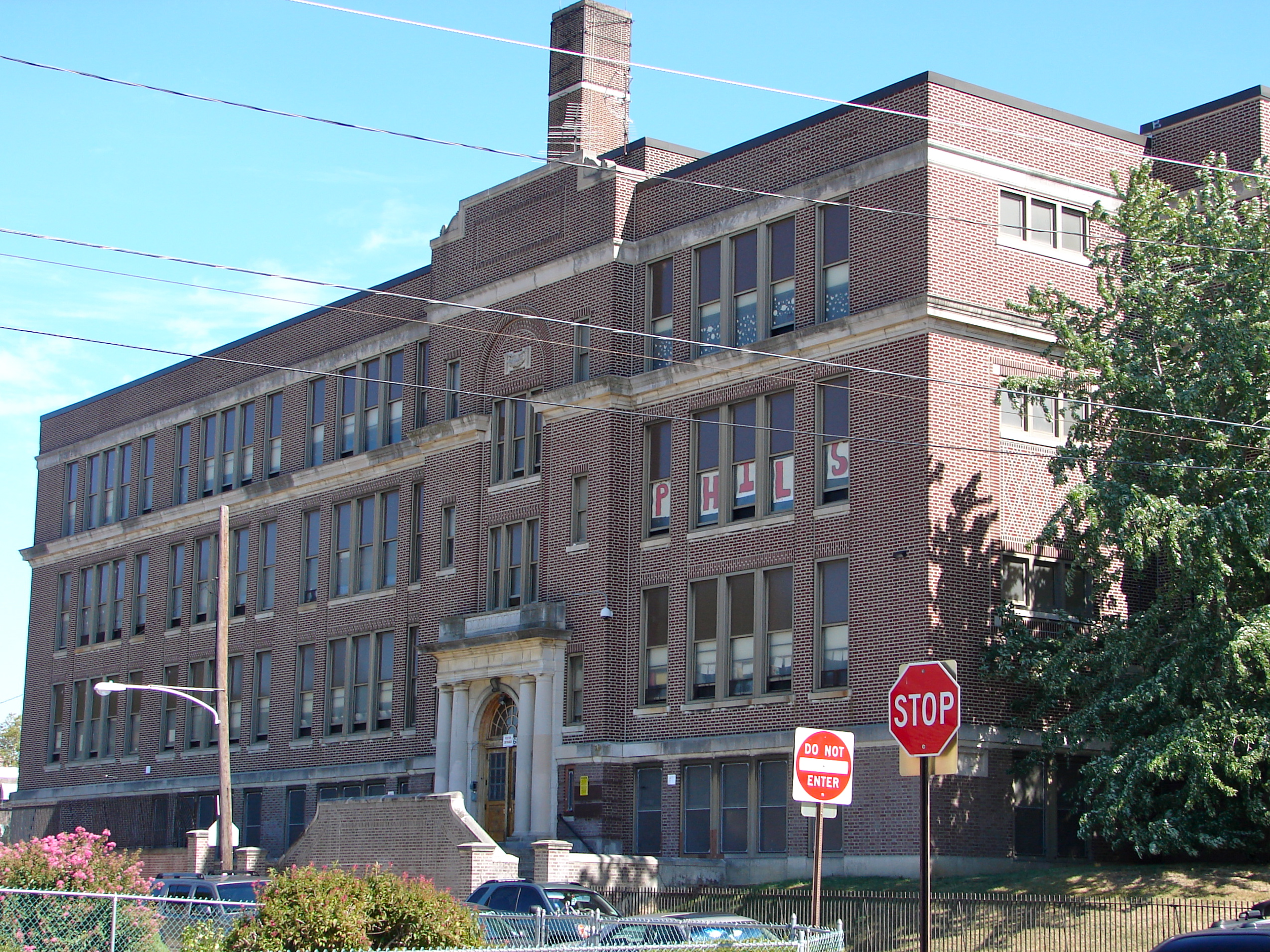
- Hamilton Disston School, September 2010

- Location within Philadelphia Location within Pennsylvania Location within the United States
- Location: 6801 Cottage St., Philadelphia, Pennsylvania
- Coordinates: 40°01′42″N 75°02′48″W
- Area: 2.5 acres (1.0 ha)
- Built: 1923–1924
- Architect: Irwin T. Catharine
- Architectural style: Colonial Revival
- MPS: Philadelphia Public Schools TR
- NRHP reference No.: 88002262
- Added to NRHP: November 18, 1988

The Hamilton Disston Elementary School is a historic K-8 school in the Tacony neighborhood of Philadelphia. It is part of the School District of Philadelphia. The school building was added to the National Register of Historic Places in 1988.

== History and architectural features ==
The building was designed by Irwin T. Catharine and built between 1923 and 1924. It is a three-story, nine-bay, brick structure which sits on a raised basement. It was designed in the Colonial Revival style, and features a central projecting entrance pavilion, stone arched surrounds, and stone cornice and brick parapet.

The school is named after Hamilton Disston, an industrialist who led the Disston Saw Works, and whose father, Henry Disston, had founded the saw works and had built Tacony as a company town for its workers.
