= Disston =

Disston may refer to:

People:

- Hamilton Disston (1844–1896), American industrialist and real-estate developer
- Henry Disston (1819–1878), English American industrialist who founded the Keystone Saw Works in 1840
- Horace Disston (1906–1982), American field hockey player

Places:

- Disston City, Gulfport, Florida, USA
- Disston, Oregon, unincorporated community in Lane County, Oregon, United States

Companies and products

- Disston Saw Works, manufacturer of handsaws in the United States

- Disston Tractor Tank

== See also ==
- Dison
