= Tacony =

Tacony may refer to:

Companies

- Tacony Corporation, a St. Louis, Missouri-based manufacturer and wholesale distributor of vacuum cleaners, sewing machines, ceiling fans, and commercial floor care equipment

Places

- Tacony, Philadelphia, Pennsylvania, an area of northeast Philadelphia
- Tacony station, a railroad station in the Tacony section of Philadelphia, Pennsylvania
- Tacony Creek, a creek in Philadelphia, which is also known as Tookany Creek and Frankford Creek along different portions of its course
- Tacony Music Hall, an historic building in the Tacony section of Philadelphia, Pennsylvania
- Tacony-Palmyra Bridge, a bridge connecting Palmyra, New Jersey and the Tacony section of Philadelphia, Pennsylvania
- Tacony Plantation in Vidalia, Louisiana, US

Ships

- CSS Tacony, a Confederate naval vessel in commission briefly in June 1863
- USS Tacony, the name of more than one ship of the United States Navy

Sports

- Tacony Disston, an early twentieth-century U.S. soccer team from Tacony, Philadelphia, Pennsylvania
