= Saw nib =

Feature of historic hand saws

A saw nib is an obsolete feature common on antique hand saws manufactured between the late 17th and early 20th centuries in Europe and North America. It takes the shape of a small protrusion (a "nib") on the back of a saw near the toe. Their origin is generally traced to 17th-century Dutch and English sawmaking. Its purpose has been heavily debated; early 20th-century saw manufacturers such as Disston Saw Works insisted the nib was purely decorative, but numerous theories and folk explanations were proposed by woodworkers and collectors. Modern historians generally conclude that the nib was probably introduced as ornamentation, though users may have later adapted it for practical purposes.

== Description ==
The word "nib" refers to "a small pointed or projecting part" according to Merriam-Webster. A saw nib is a protrusion on the back of a hand saw near the end. Raymond R. Townsend described three primary shapes of the nib in his October 1983 article in The Fine Tool Journal, namely "round", "rectangular", and "pyramidal".

=== Variations ===
Some saws included a row of several teeth on the back of the saw in place of a nib. This unconventional modification was possibly made by the joiners themselves and used for cutting through nails in the wood; by sacrificing the teeth on the nib, damage to the teeth on the front of the saw could be avoided. An unusual saw produced by R. H. Smith & Co. Ltd. in St. Catherine's, Ontario possessed a pyramidal projection between a pair of rectangular nibs.

== Origin ==
Williams (1995) states that the origin of saw nibs dates back to the mid-to-late 17th century. With the introduction of water-powered rolling of strip steel around 1650, broad-bladed saws became available in England and Holland. The thin knife-like or pistol-grip handle and wider blade gave the new hand saws an unbalanced appearance. Dutch sawmakers counteracted this by adding a cosmetic element to the toe of the saw for aesthetics and making the blade appear lighter. By the end of the 17th century, this decoration was marked by stops, curls, and elaborate piercing. This ornate decoration reflected the perceived higher prestige of wide-bladed saws compared to narrow-bladed counterparts at the time. English archaeologist Flinders Petrie noted in his 1917 book Tools and Weapons that a Dutch hand saw manufactured in 1694 featured a protrusion near the toe of a tapered blade with a hole for hanging the saw. Carpenters at Work, a 1698 engraving by Johann Christoph Weigel, depicted a hand saw resembling the one illustrated in Tools and Weapons, with a curved toe shaped like a large nib.

When switching to wider blades, English sawmakers replaced the thin knife or pistol-grip handle with a wide, flat handle, which allowed higher pressure to be applied to the saw and improved control of the blade, user confort, and visual balance between the handle and blade, thus eliminating the need for the elaborate toe decoration. After the Glorious Revolution of 1689, Dutch artisans brought to England by William III of England and Mary II adopted the English-style handles but kept minimal ornamentation on the toe.

Elsewhere, nibs were added to saws in Scandinavia and North America. A saw similar to the one in Carpenters at Work is shown in Ancient Carpenters' Tools (1929) by Henry Chapman Mercer. This workpiece, which had a down-cut blade and a small nib, was likely made prior to 1768 and used by a gravedigger at Buckingham Friends Meeting House. The History of Woodworking Tools (1964) by W. L. Goodman (Note: William Louis Goodman. Packham (2005) erroneously lists the author name as W. M. Goodman.) showed an 18th-century Swedish saw with a complex toe shape. Goodman used this example to propose that the nib in later saws was a vestige of such decorations. The Dictionary of Tools Used in the Woodworking and Allied Trades c. 1700-1970 (1975) by Raphael Salaman supported this Dutch or Scandinavian origin in the 17–18th centuries. In 1816, Joseph Smith's Explanation or Key to the Various Manufactories of Sheffield listed a saw with a small, residual nib, mirroring later designs.

== Uses ==
The earliest known reference to the use of saw nibs appeared in Handbook for Lumbermen, published by Disston Saw Works in 1902, which stated that the saw nib is only an adornment that breaks the straight line of the saw's back with "no practical use whatever." This claim was repeated in later issues of the handbook, and has been quoted in contemporary sources. Nick Engler pointed out that the design of the nibs on most saws were utilitarian and failed to serve any decorative purpose. Erwin L. Schaffer argued in his 1994 review of the 1902 handbook that Henry Disston himself considered the nib's function on his saws as purely cosmetic.

The English journal Notes and Queries presented a question dated 19 July 1902 regarding its origin, nomenclature, and application. The reply on 6 August stated that, according to a foreman of an ironmongering firm, the part had no name or purpose, and that producers were removing the element from new saws. The last saws with nibs were made in the early 1920s. An article in the December 1959 edition of The Woodworker claimed that by the time of its publishing the meaning of the nib was lost on the saw manufacturers themselves.

Numerous folk theories have emerged on practical uses of the saw nib; Erwin L. Schaffer, a saw specialist with the Mid-West Tool Collectors Association, found between 745 and 1,000 different explanations in his research. The February 1984 issue of the magazine Carpenter, published by the United Brotherhood of Carpenters and Joiners of America, cited 18 distinct uses received from over 100 carpenters who responded to their survey. Over half of the participants stated it was used as a marker and/or a starter tooth when making a fresh cut on lumber, and another 18% mentioned using it for drawing arcs or circles. An October 1984 article on the Lansing State Journal asserted that the nib was used during the production process as a hook for hanging fresh saws above an acid vat when cleaning off fingerprints and grease from the steel by dousing them in acid. Nick Engler suggested that the nib was a marker showing how far the saw should be pulled back to use the entire length of the saw. James Gauntlett disputed Disston's claim that the nib was useless in the December 1994 issue of The Chronicle, which was produced by the Early American Industries Association, saying that the nib was employed to retain the guard on the saw blade, although he did not claim this to be its original use. Similarly, Robin Wyllie wrote that the saw nib was a vestigial yet still functional remnant of the forward guard tie notch present on 18th century saws from Europe. Jim Packham challenged this theory, maintaining that a simple notch would have sufficed for this purpose, and that a saw guard could be held without any nib or notch.

Raymond R. Townsend concluded in his October 1983 article in The Fine Tool Journal that while the nib certainly saw practical usage, unless there is concrete evidence that the nib had a designed purpose, it must be considered purely decorative. Erwin L. Schaffer echoed this statement, acknowledging that although he preferred the explanation that the nib had a function, no use other than ornamentation could be inferred without evidence to the contrary. In the April 1998 issue of Fine Woodworking, one of the associate editors of the magazine, Zachary Gaulkin, suggested that carpenters may have invented ways to utilize what was supposed to be a cosmetic feature. Jim Packham agreed with Townsend and Schaffer in his 2005 review that the nib was likely meant for embellishment and commented that Disston's wording in the handbooks that the nib had "no practical use whatever" may have caused misunderstanding between its intended application and its use in practice.
