= Laurel Hill Cemetery =

Historic cemetery in Philadelphia, Pennsylvania, US

- U.S. National Register of Historic Places
- U.S. National Historic Landmark
- Pennsylvania state historical marker
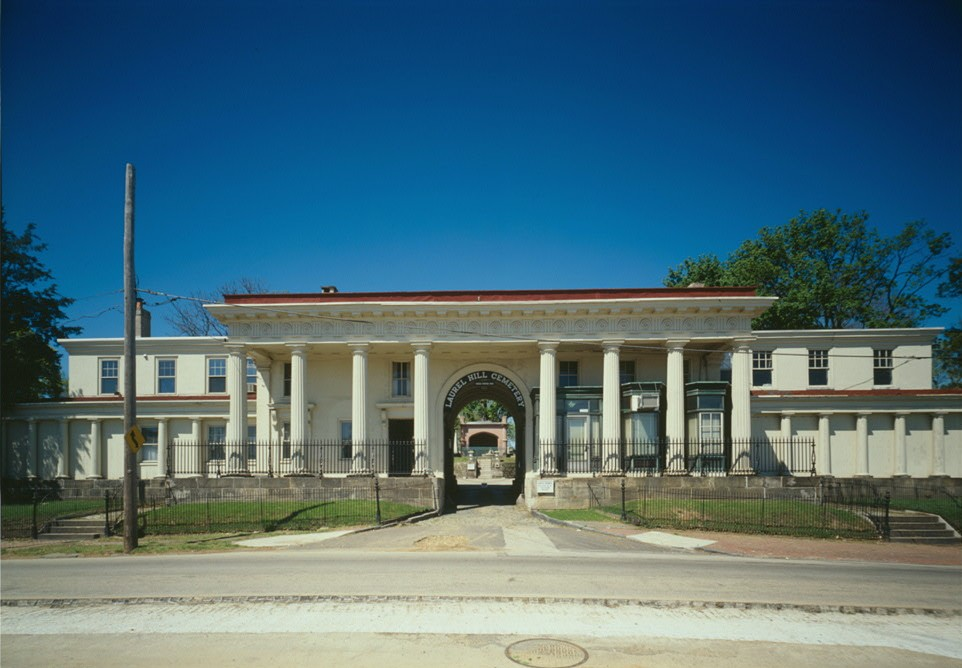
- Laurel Hill Cemetery Gatehouse in 1972

- Location within Pennsylvania
- Location: 3822 Ridge Avenue, Philadelphia, Pennsylvania, U.S.
- Coordinates: 40°00′14″N 75°11′15″W
- Built: 1836–1839
- Architect: John Notman
- Architectural style: Exotic Revival, Gothic, Classical Revival
- NRHP reference No.: 77001185

Significant dates
- Added to NRHP: October 28, 1977
- Designated PHMC: May 20, 2000

Laurel Hill Cemetery, also called Laurel Hill East to distinguish it from the affiliated West Laurel Hill Cemetery in Bala Cynwyd, is a historic rural cemetery in the East Falls neighborhood of Philadelphia. Founded in 1836, it was the second major rural cemetery in the United States after Mount Auburn Cemetery in Boston, Massachusetts.

The cemetery is 74 acres (300,000 m^{2}) in size and overlooks the Schuylkill River. The cemetery was designed by John Notman and grew to its current size through the purchase of four land parcels between 1836 and 1861. It contains over 11,000 family lots and more than 33,000 graves, including many adorned with grand marble and granite funerary monuments, elaborately sculpted hillside tombs, and mausoleums. It is an accredited arboretum with over 6,000 trees and shrubs representing 700 species.

In 1977, Laurel Hill Cemetery was listed on the National Register of Historic Places and in 1998, became the first cemetery in the United States to be designated a National Historic Landmark.

== History ==
=== 19th century ===
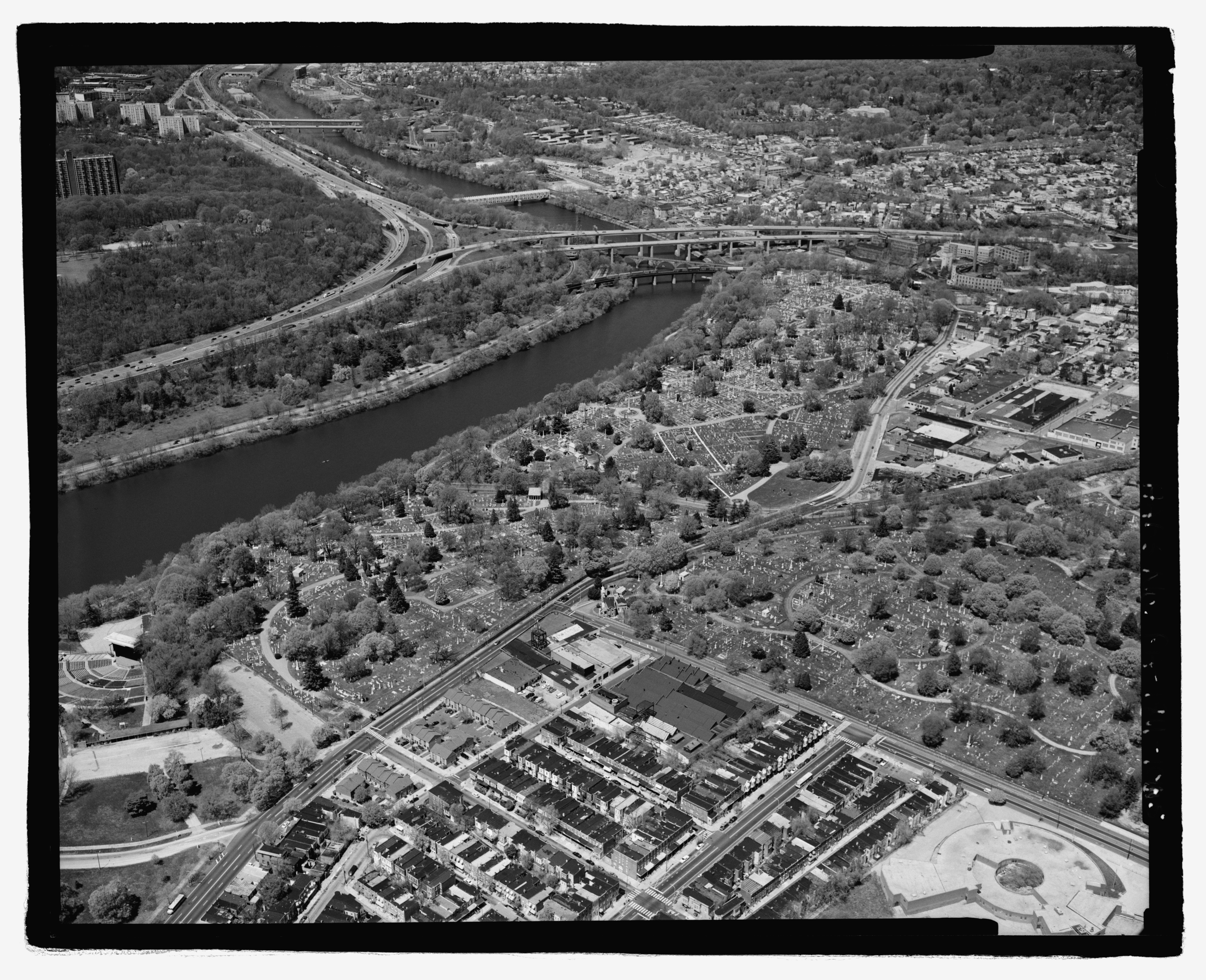
Aerial view of Laurel Hill Cemetery (on the left) near the Schuylkill River and nearby Mount Vernon Cemetery (on the right)

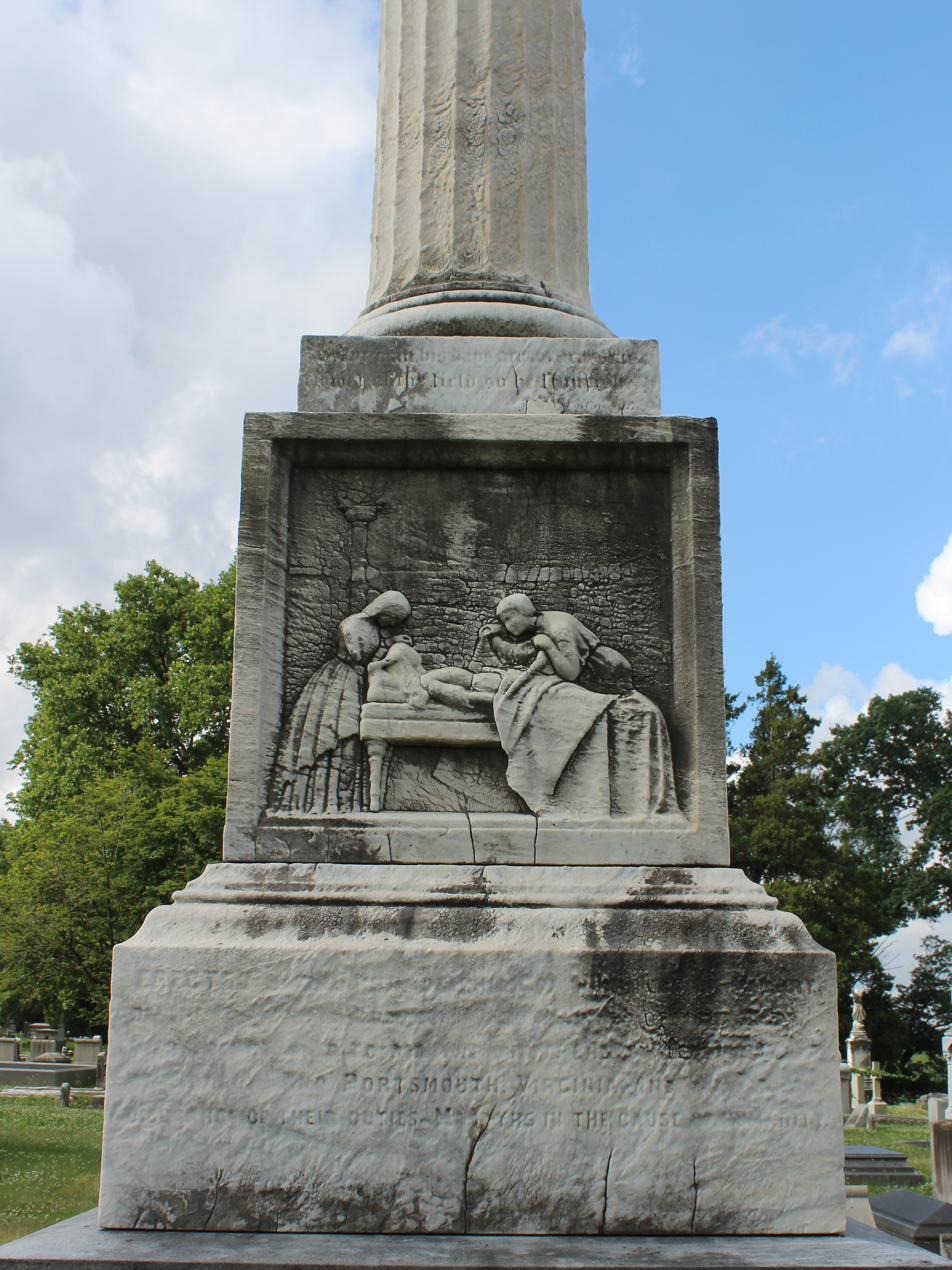
The Yellow Fever Memorial was built in 1855 to honor Philadelphia's "Doctors, Druggists and Nurses" who helped fight the epidemic in Portsmouth, Virginia

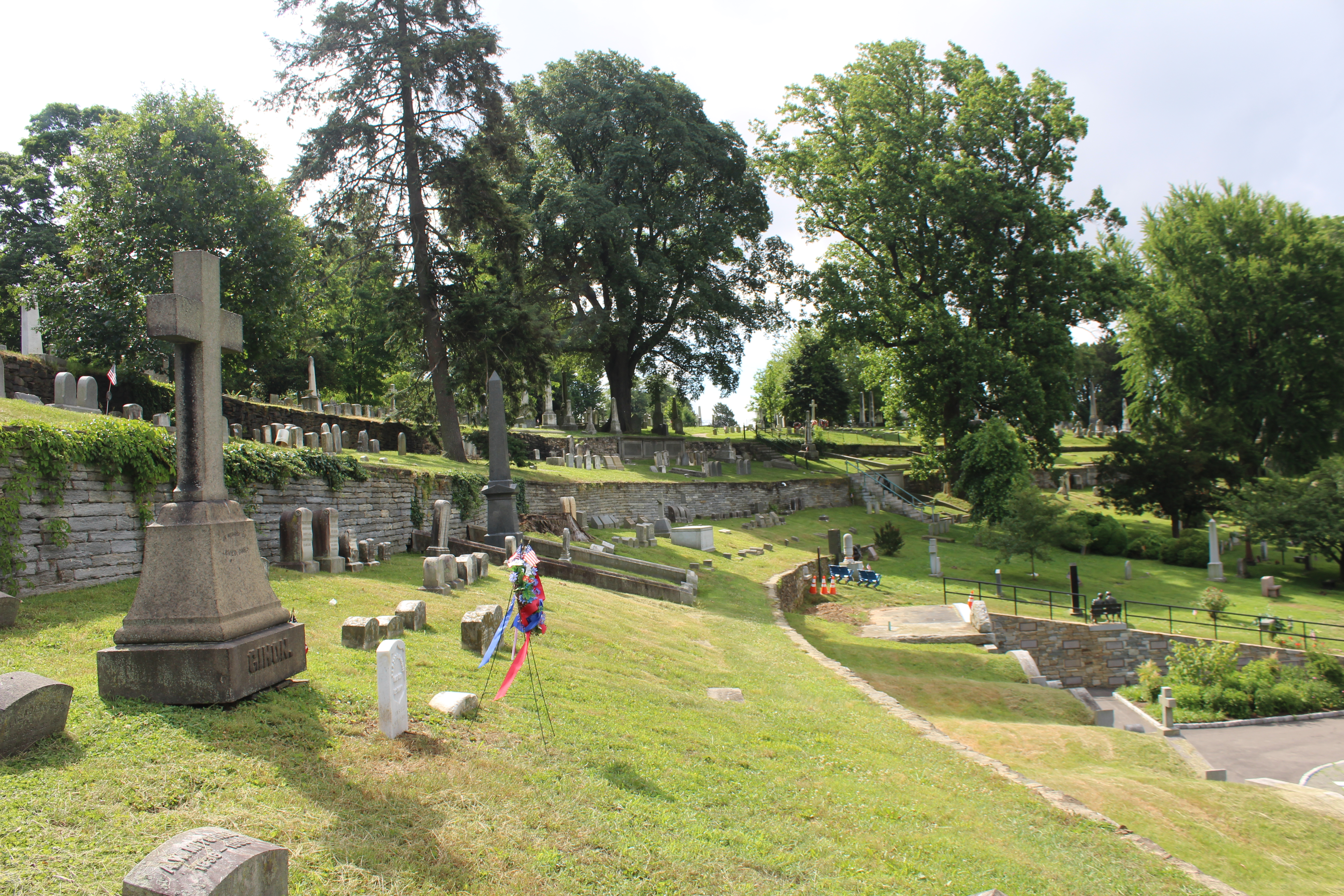
The cemetery was designed by John Notman with strings of terraces that descend to the Schuylkill River

The cemetery was founded in 1836 by John Jay Smith, a librarian and editor with interests in horticulture and real estate, who was distressed at the way his deceased daughter was interred at the Arch Street Meeting House burial ground in Philadelphia. Smith wrote, "Philadelphia should have a rural cemetery on dry ground, where feelings should not be harrowed by viewing the bodies of beloved relatives plunged into mud and water."

Smith joined forces with other prominent Philadelphia citizens including Benjamin Wood Richards, William Strickland and Nathan Dunn to form the Laurel Hill Cemetery Company and create a rural cemetery three miles north of the Philadelphia border on the east bank of the Schuylkill River. The group considered several locations but decided on the 32 acre former estate of businessman Joseph Sims known as "Laurel" or "Laurel Hill". The location was viewed as a haven from urban expansion and a respite from the increasingly industrialized city center. The city later grew past Laurel Hill, but the cemetery retained its rural character.

Designs for the cemetery were submitted by William Strickland and Thomas Ustick Walter but the commission selected Scottish-American architect John Notman. Notman's designs incorporated the topography of the location and included a string of terraces that descended to the river. Notman built upon designs incorporated by Henry Edward Kendall at Kensal Green Cemetery in London. The cemetery was developed and completed between 1836 and 1839. Notman designed the gatehouse which consists of a massive Roman arch surrounded by an imposing classical colonnade and topped with a large ornamental urn. A large Gothic Revival style chapel was built on the grounds but removed in the 1880s to make room for additional graves.

In 1836, the cemetery purchased a group of three sandstone statues from Scottish sculptor James Thom, known as Old Mortality. The statues were placed in a small enclosure in the central courtyard directly in front of the main gatehouse. The statues are based on a tale by Sir Walter Scott and depict Scott talking to Old Mortality, an elderly man who traveled through the Scottish Highlands re-carving weathered tombstones, along with his pony. A plaster bust of the artist, James Thom, was added to the display in 1872. The owners of the cemetery intended to equate the mission of Old Mortality with their own – to keep the cemetery in perpetual care so future generations may remember the deceased.

To increase its cachet, the cemetery's organizers had the remains of several famous Revolutionary War figures moved there, including Continental Congress secretary Charles Thomson; Declaration of Independence signer Thomas McKean; Philadelphia war veteran and shipbuilder Jehu Eyre; hero of the Battle of Princeton, Hugh Mercer; and first director of the U.S. Mint, David Rittenhouse.

Many of the elaborate funerary monuments were designed by notable artists and architects including Alexander Milne Calder, Alexander Stirling Calder, Harriet Whitney Frishmuth and William Strickland. The monument design styles include Classical Revival, Gothic Revival and Egyptian Revival made out of materials such as marble, granite, cast-iron and sandstone.

From its inception, Laurel Hill was intended as a civic institution designed for public use. In an era before public parks, museums and arboretums, it was a multi-purpose cultural attraction where the general public could experience the art and refinement previously known only to the wealthy. By the late 1840s, Laurel Hill was an immensely popular destination. Writer Andrew Jackson Downing reported "nearly 30,000 persons…entered the gates between April and December, 1848."

In 1844, due to increasing popularity, Laurel Hill purchased the 27-acre former estate of jurist William Rawle, half a mile south and named it South Laurel Hill. In 1849, a set of iron gates on sandstone piers was built in the southeastern corner of the cemetery and served as a secondary entrance.

In 1855, the Pennsylvania State Assembly authorized the cemetery to purchase an additional 10 acres from Frederick Stoever known as the Stoever Tract. The Yellow Fever Monument was built in this section in 1859 to honor the "Doctors, Druggists and Nurses" who helped fight the epidemic in Portsmouth, Virginia.

In 1860, Laurel Hill Cemetery had an estimated 140,000 people visit annually.

In 1861, the 21-acre estate of George Pepper between the two cemeteries was purchased and named Central Laurel Hill. With these additions, the cemetery reached the current size of approximately 95 acres. A bridge was built over Hunting Park Avenue to connect Central and South Laurel Hill.

The cemetery association restricted who could buy lots and the majority of burials were for white Protestants. The cemetery discouraged unmarried people from buying lots in order to keep the cemetery as a family destination.

During and after the American Civil War, Laurel Hill became the final resting place of hundreds of military figures, including 40 Civil War-era generals. Laurel Hill also became the favored burial place for many of Philadelphia's most prominent political and business figures, including Matthias W. Baldwin, founder of the Baldwin Locomotive Works; Henry Disston, owner of the largest saw factory in the world (the Disston Saw Works); and financier Peter A. B. Widener.

By the mid-19th century, the creation of Fairmount Park and the encroaching city began to limit the expansion of Laurel Hill Cemetery. In 1869, John Jay Smith, the founder of Laurel Hill Cemetery, purchased 200 acres from three farms in nearby Bala Cynwyd, Pennsylvania for the creation of West Laurel Hill Cemetery. The first burial occurred in 1870.

=== 20th century ===
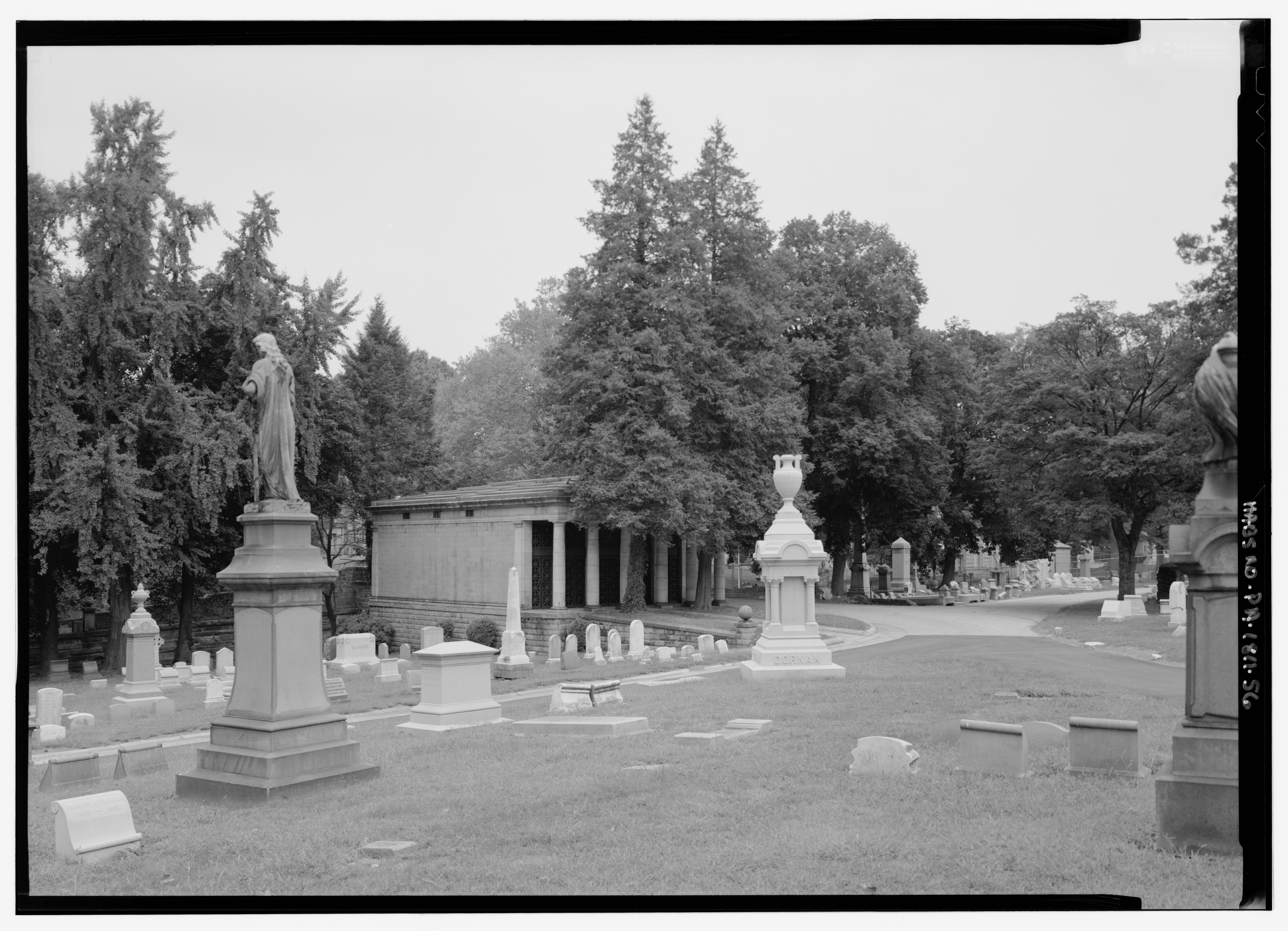
The terra cotta receiving vault in South Laurel Hill was built in 1913

In 1913, a Doric receiving vault made of terra cotta was built in South Laurel Hill near the bridge connecting it to Central Laurel Hill.

By the 1970s, Laurel Hill Cemetery had fallen out of favor as a burial site. Many bodies were re-interred at the more suburban West Laurel Hill Cemetery and the remaining graves suffered neglect, vandalism and crime.

In 1973, Laurel Hill updated its policy and removed the prohibition on the burial of African-Americans in the cemetery.

In 1978, the Friends of Laurel Hill Cemetery, a 501(c)(3) non-profit organization, was founded by descendants of John Jay Smith to support the cemetery. The mission of the Friends is to assist the Laurel Hill Cemetery Company in preserving and promoting the historical character of Laurel Hill. The Friends raise funds and seek contributed services; prepare educational and research materials emphasizing the historical, architectural and cultural importance of Laurel Hill Cemetery; and provide tour guides to educate the public. The organization was instrumental in Laurel Hill Cemetery's placement on the National Register of Historic Places in 1977 and designation as a National Historic Landmark in 1998.

=== 21st century ===
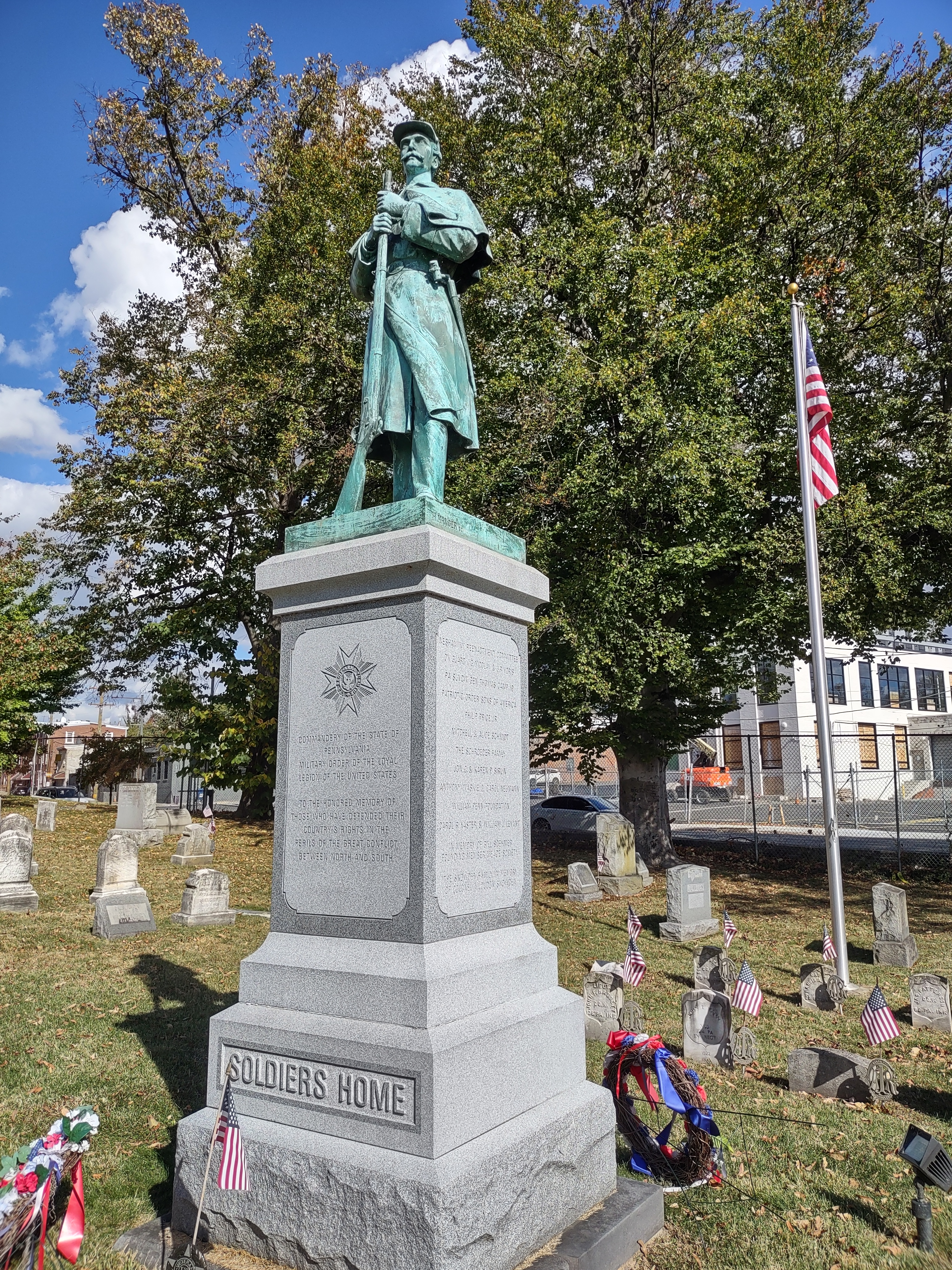
"The Silent Sentry" was stolen from Mount Moriah Cemetery in 1970 but was recovered and rededicated in Laurel Hill in 2013.

In 2013, an 1883 bronze statue of a Civil War soldier was moved to Laurel Hill Cemetery. Cast at the Bureau Brothers Foundry, "The Silent Sentry" weighs 700 pounds and stands 7 feet, 2 inches high. It was installed in 1883 at the Soldiers' Home of Philadelphia burial plot in Mount Moriah Cemetery. In 1970, thieves removed the statue from its base and attempted to sell it as scrap metal to a scrap yard in Camden, New Jersey, but the scrap dealer notified the authorities. It was recovered and repaired by the Military Order of the Loyal Legion of the United States. In 2013, the statue was installed and rededicated in Laurel Hill Cemetery.

Laurel Hill Cemetery is also an accredited arboretum with over 6,000 trees and shrubs representing 700 species. The arboretum is a member of the American Public Gardens Association.

Laurel Hill Cemetery is a popular tourist destination that attracts thousands of visitors every year for historical tours, concerts, and physical recreation.

== In popular culture ==
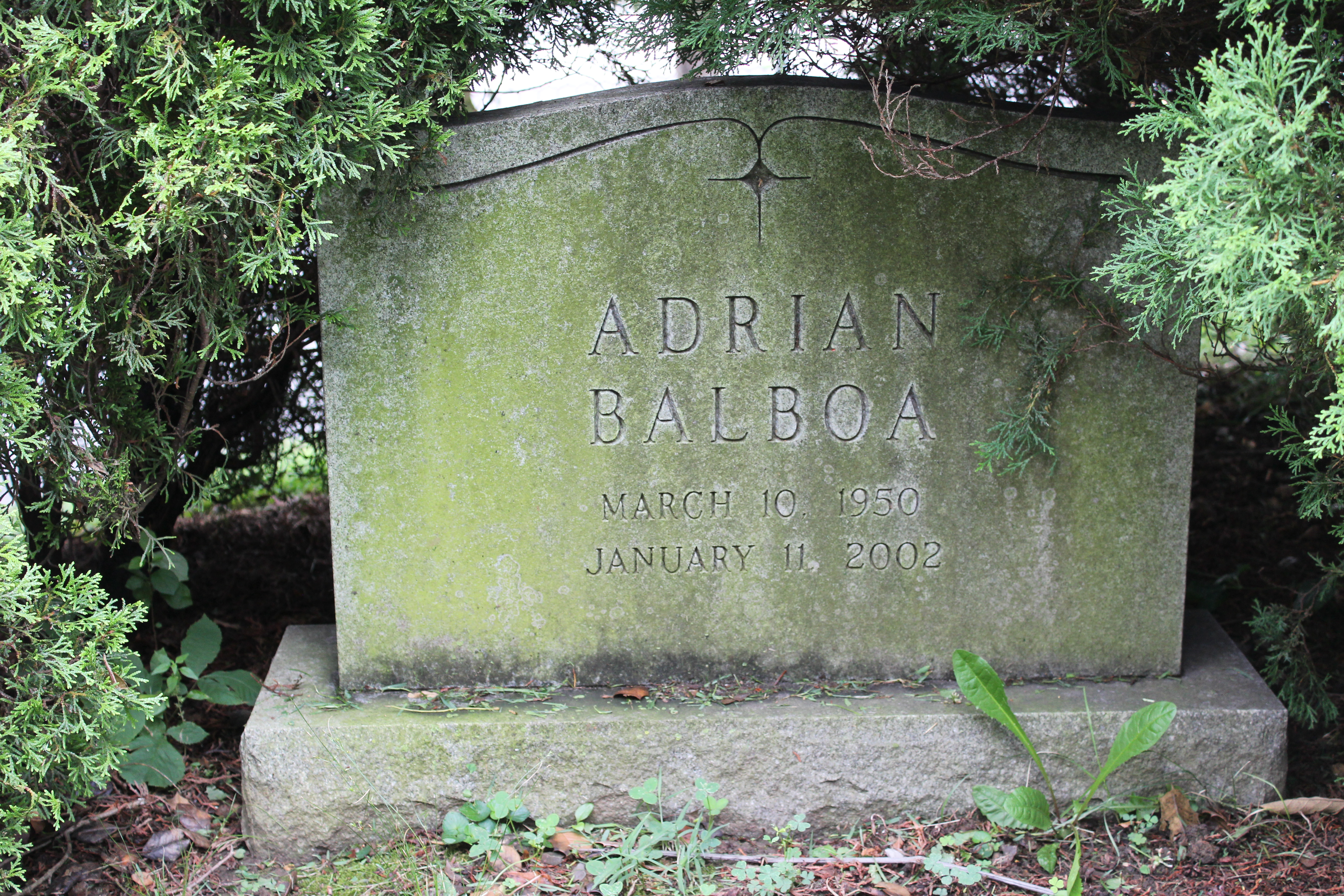
Headstone for the fictional character Adrian Balboa from the Rocky movie franchise

- Tombstones for the fictional characters Adrian Balboa and Paulie Pennino from the Rocky movies sit near the main gatehouse. The Adrian Balboa tombstone was used as a prop in the 2006 movie Rocky Balboa and both were used in the 2015 movie Creed. In the films, Rocky visits the gravesites in the cemetery's South Laurel Hill section.
- In 2009, Laurel Hill was a movie location for the films Transformers: Revenge of the Fallen and Law Abiding Citizen.
- The 2010 young adult book Tombstone Tea by Joanne Dahme takes place in Laurel Hill Cemetery and some of the well-known people buried there, such as Adam Forepaugh and Elisha Kent Kane, appear as characters.

== Gallery ==
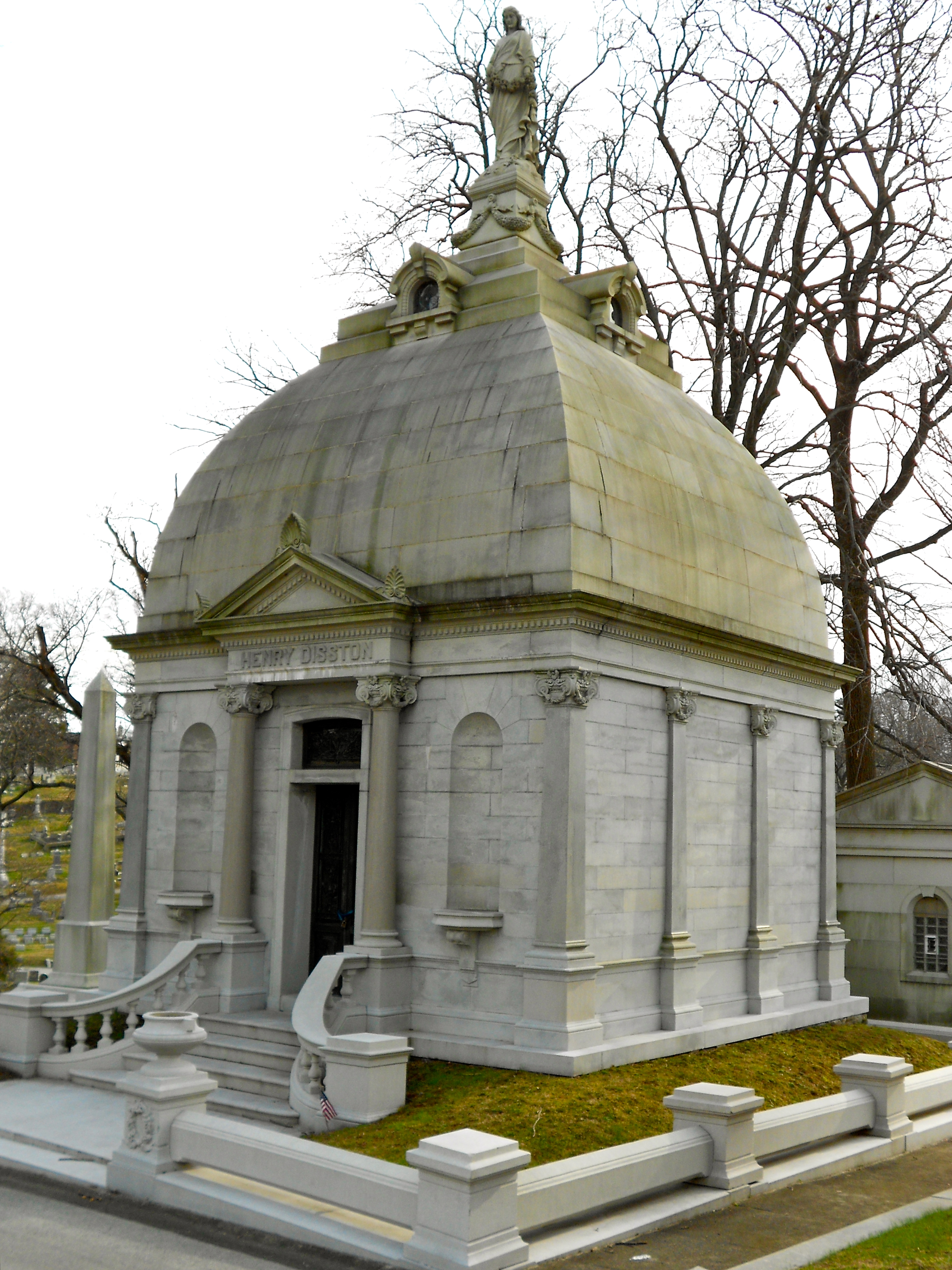
The Henry Disston family mausoleum is the largest monument in Laurel Hill

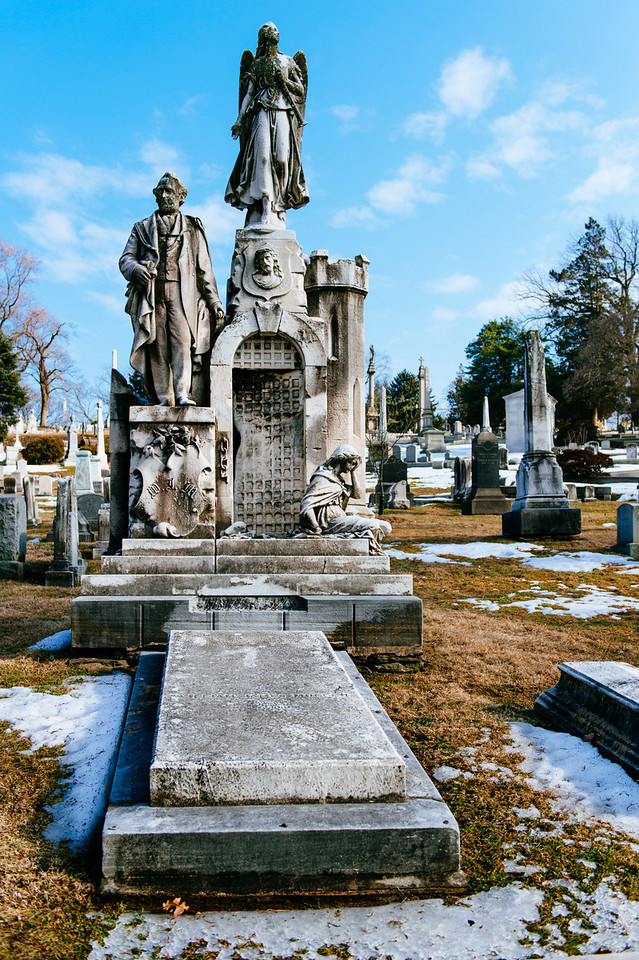
The monument for William J. Mullen was built by Daniel Kornbau and exhibited at the 1876 Centennial Exhibition

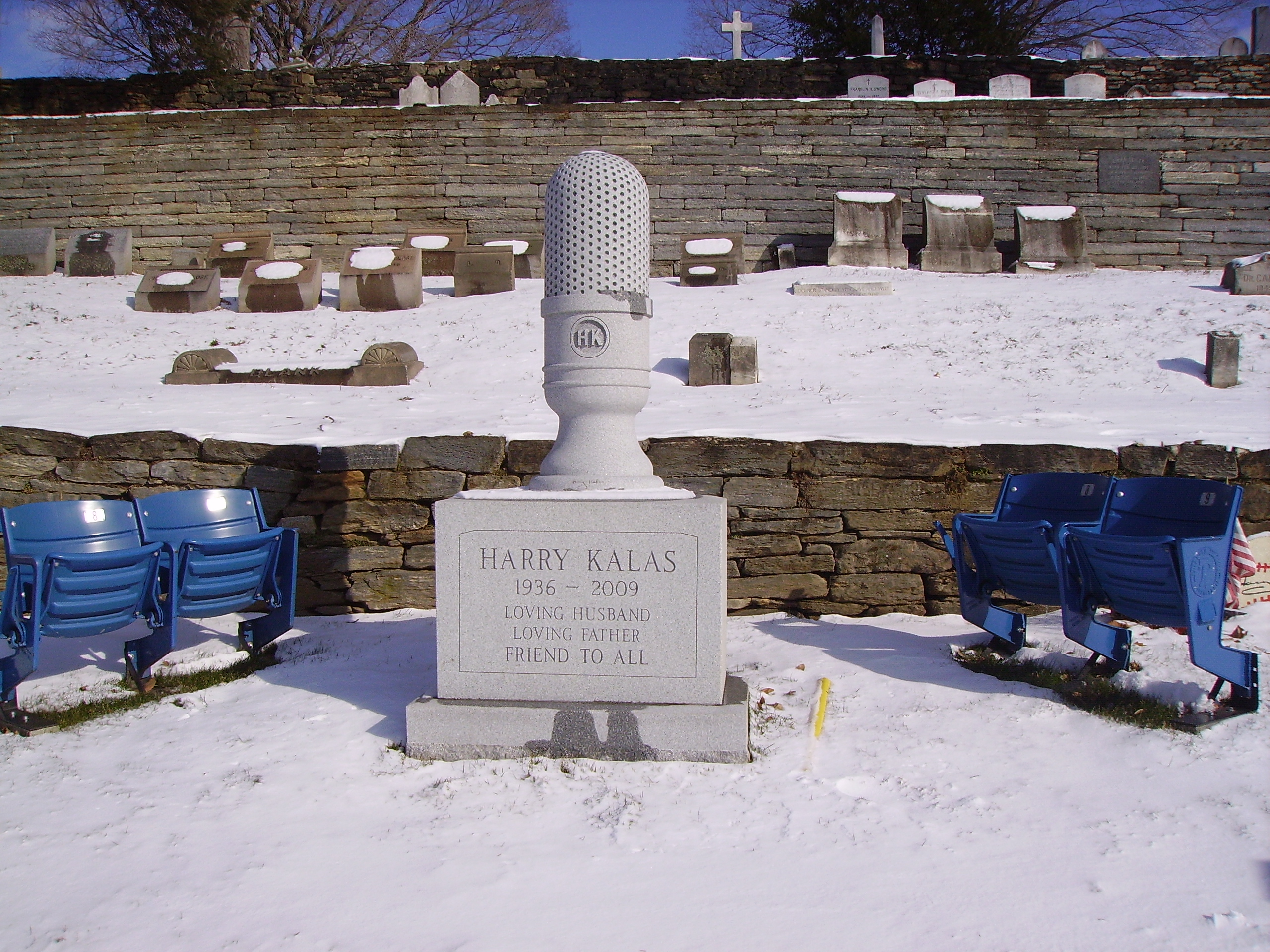
The gravesite of Harry Kalas, Philadelphia Phillies radio broadcaster, includes a microphone shaped tombstone and two pairs of seats from Veterans Stadium

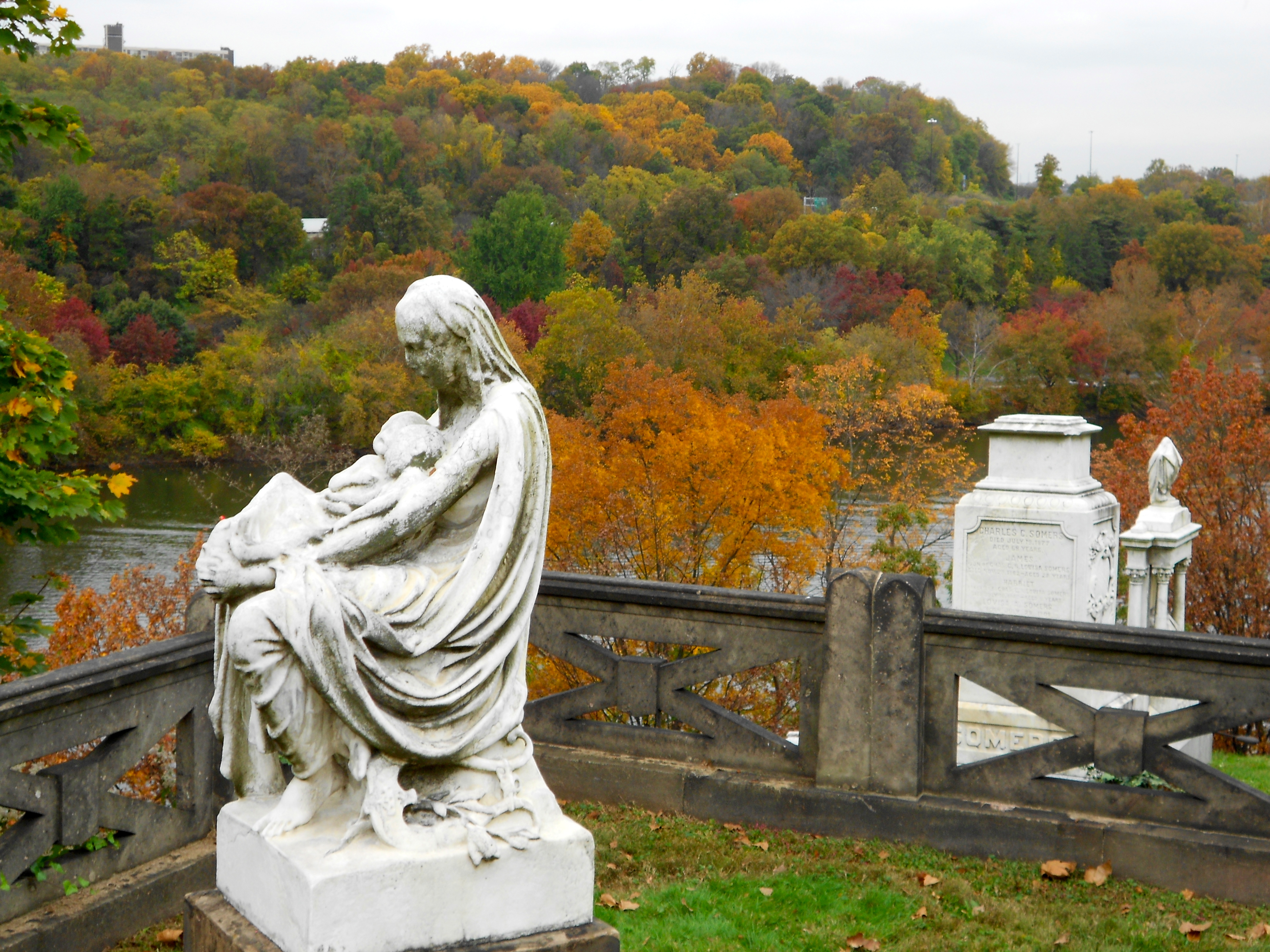
The Mother and Twins Monument was carved by Polish sculptor Henry Dmochowski-Saunders. It depicts his deceased wife Helena Schaff and their two deceased children

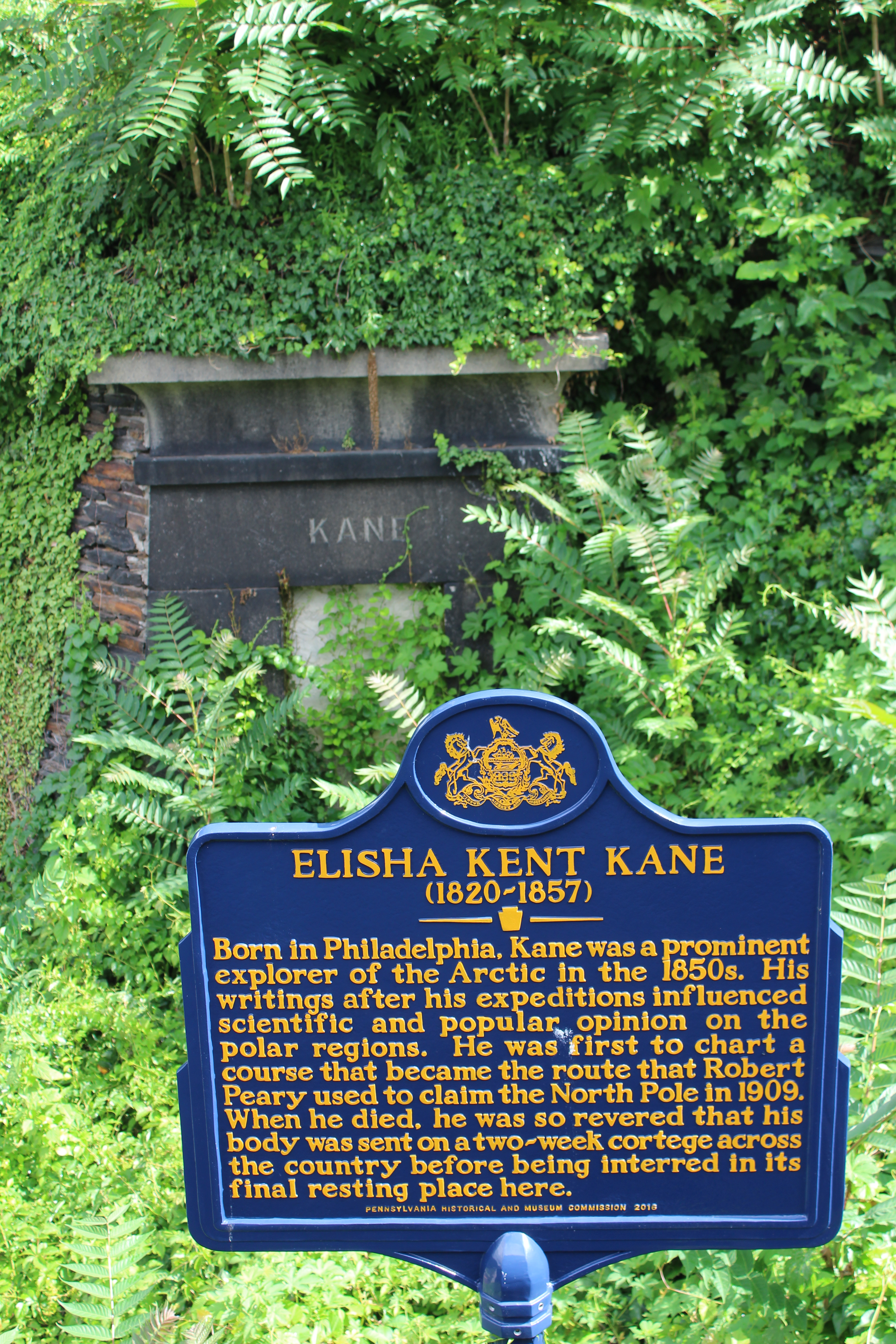
Polar explorer Elisha Kent Kane was interred in the family's hillside tomb

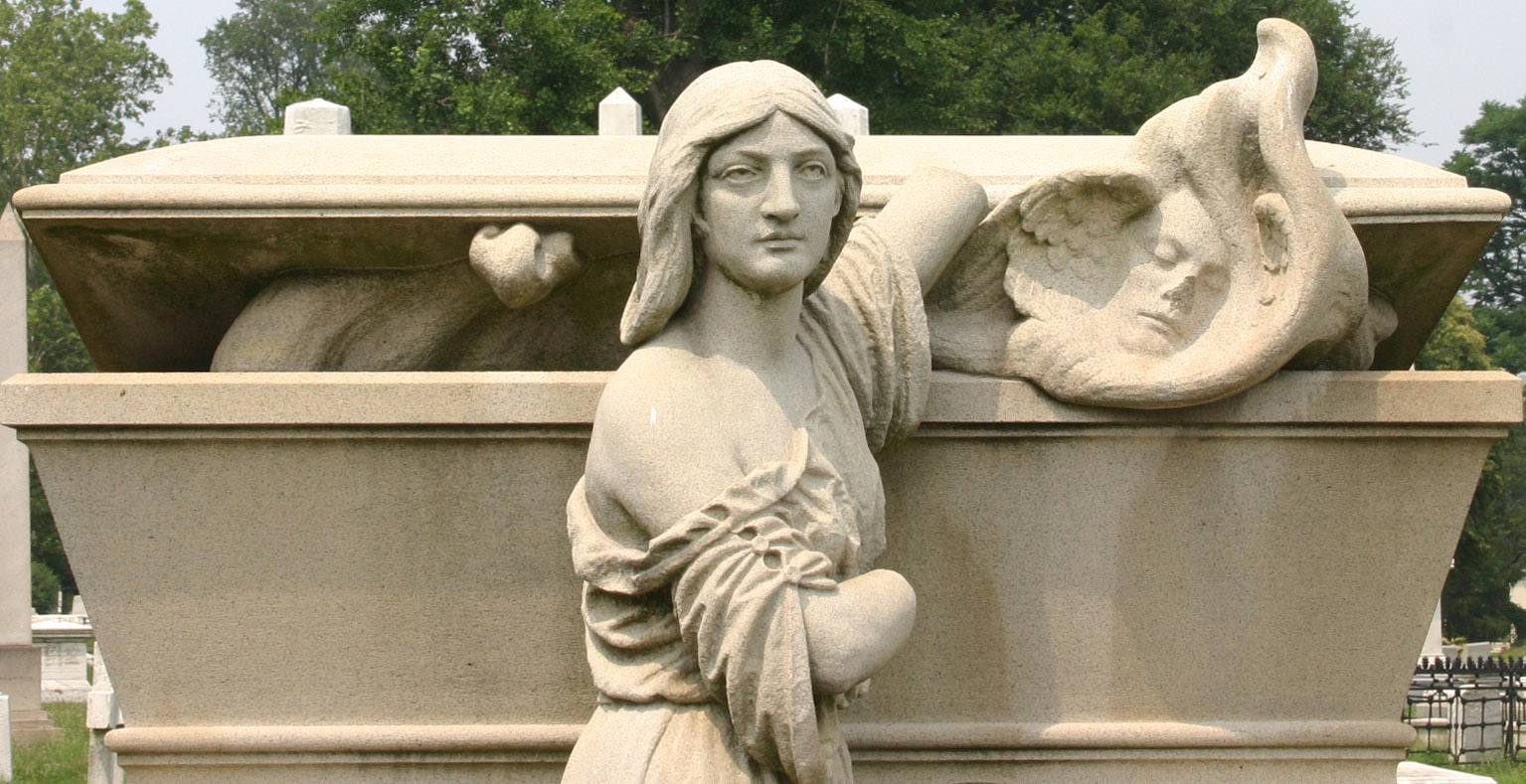
Sculpture on William Warner memorial by Alexander Milne Calder depicting a woman releasing a soul from a sarcophagus

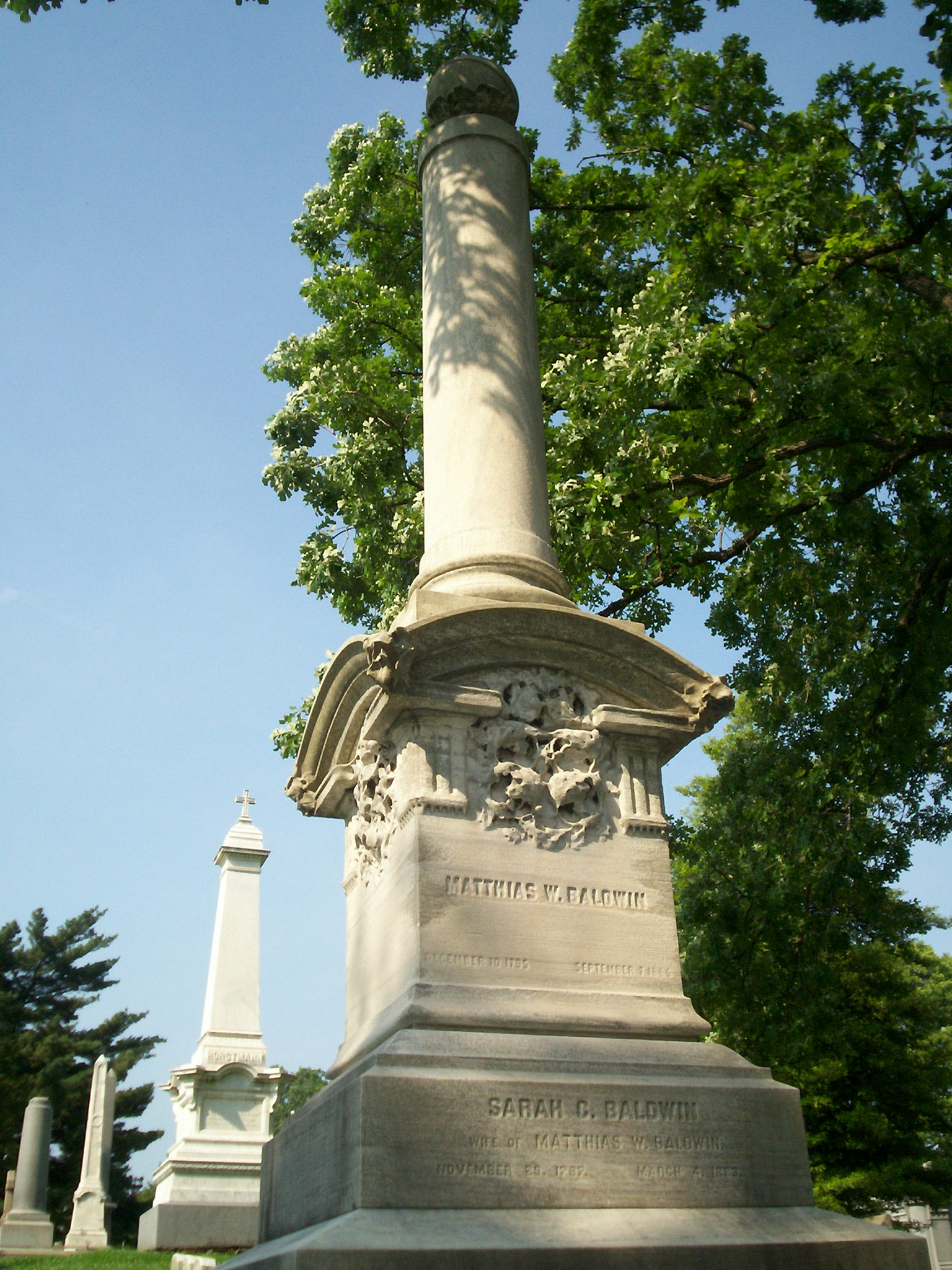
Memorial for Matthias W. Baldwin, founder of Baldwin Locomotive Works

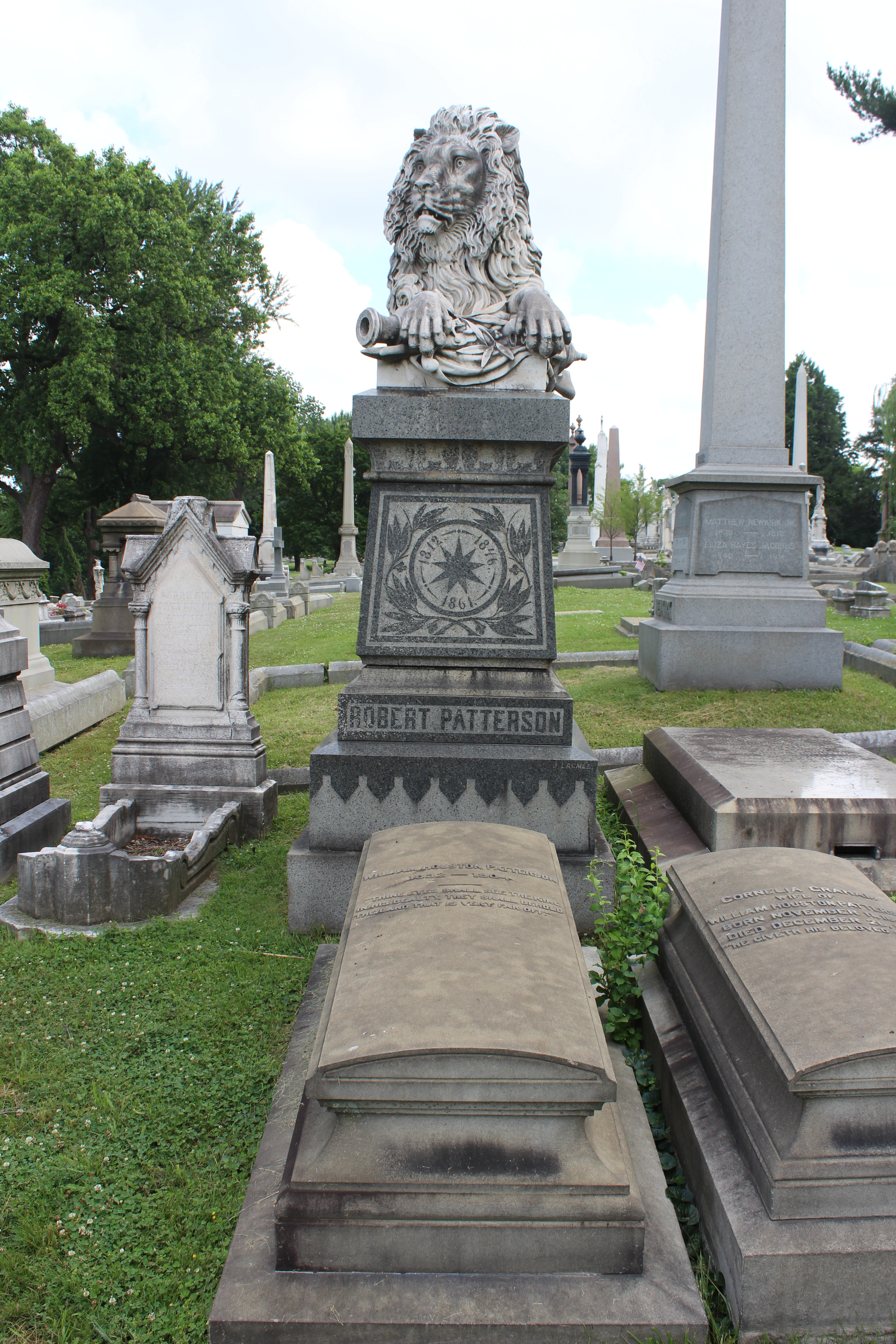
Memorial for Robert Patterson, Union army general during the American Civil War

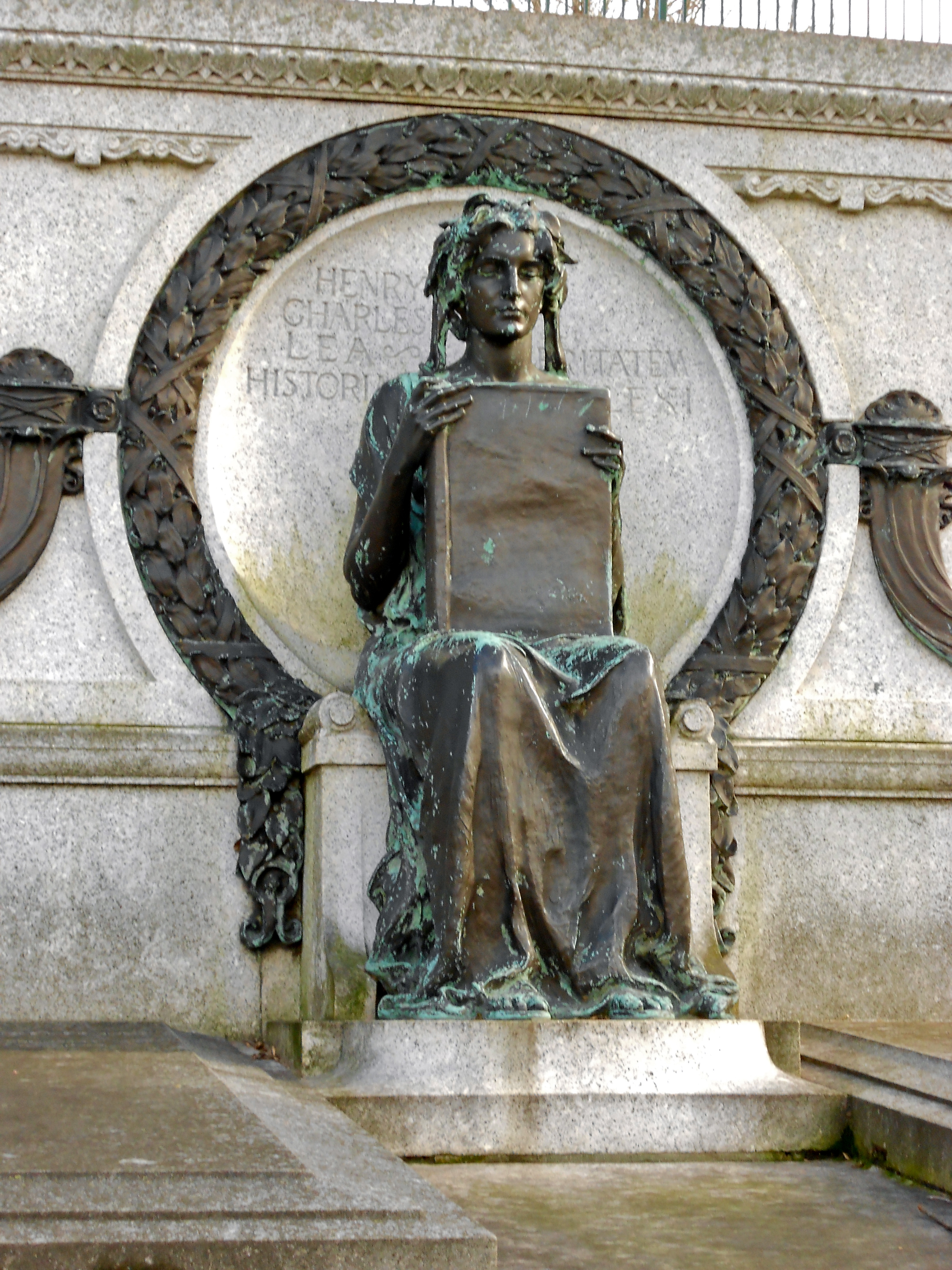
The tomb of historian Henry Charles Lea is adorned with a bronze sculpture of Clio, the muse of history, by Alexander Stirling Calder

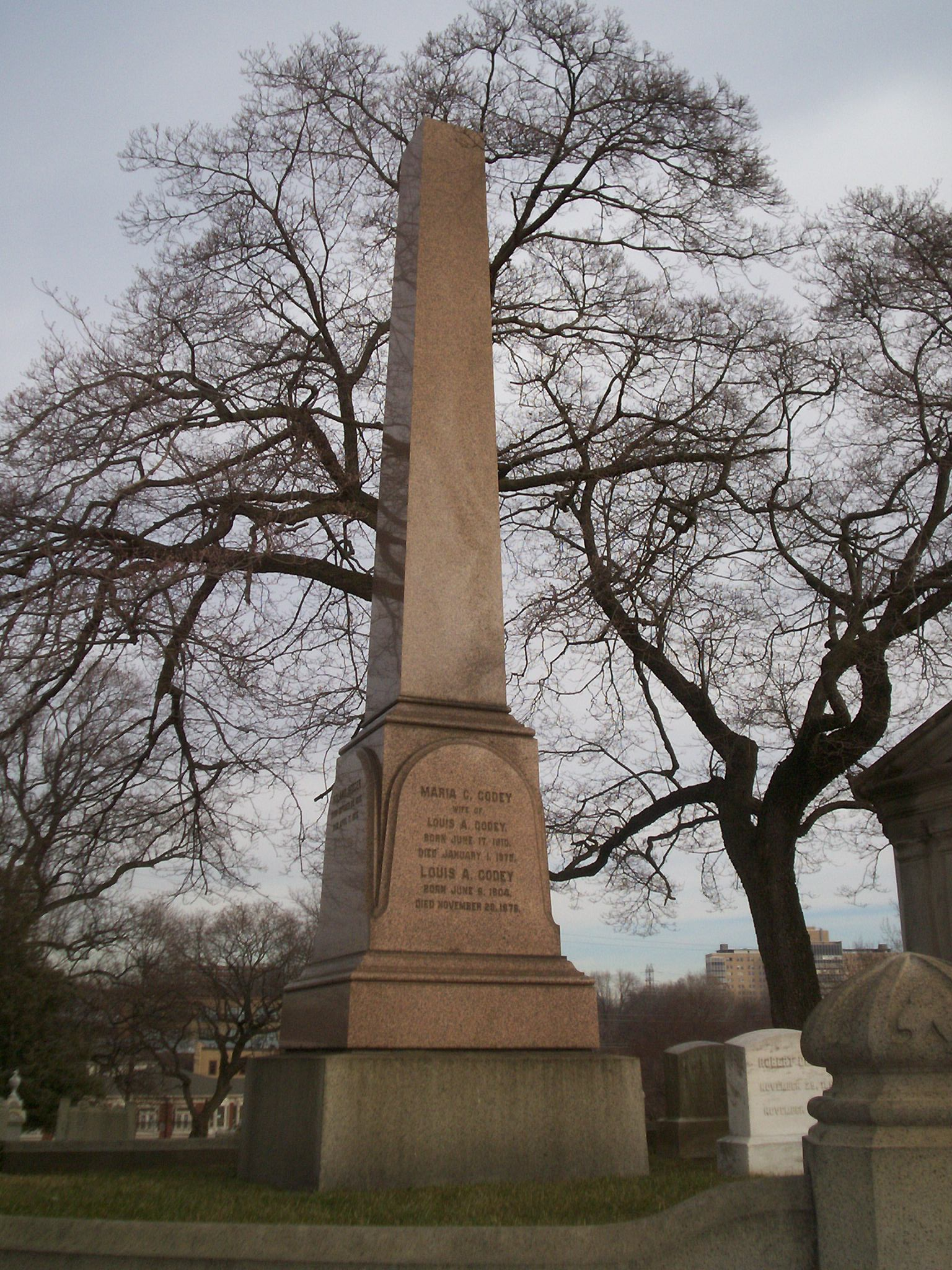
Memorial for Louis Antoine Godey, editor and publisher of Godey's Lady's Book

== See also ==
- List of United States cemeteries
