= NIBS =

NIBS or Nibs may refer to:

- National Institute of Building Sciences
- Non-Invasive Brain Stimulation, noninvasive forms of neurostimulation
- Non-invasive backscattering
- Nib (pen)
- Cacao nibs, pieces of roasted cocoa bean, generally ground into powder, but also inserted into chocolate bars to give additional "crunch"
- Nibs, one of the Lost Boys in Peter Pan
- Nibs was the name by which L. Ron Hubbard's son Ronald DeWolf was broadly known
- A miniature variety of Twizzlers candy
- NIBS Buses, bus operator in Essex, England

== See also ==
- NIB (disambiguation)
