= C. V. Boys =

British physicist (1855–1944)

Sir Charles Vernon Boys
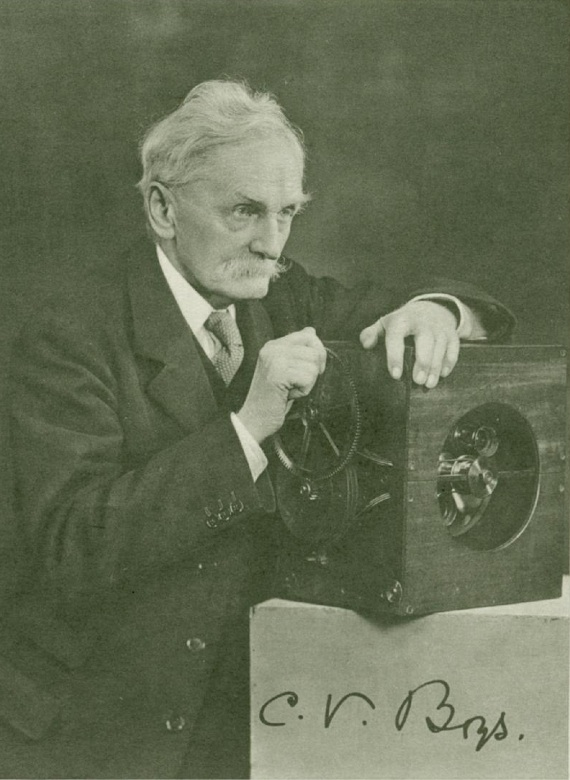
- Sir Charles Vernon Boys, FRS
- Born: 15 March 1855; Wing, Rutland, England
- Died: 30 March 1944 (aged 89); St Mary Bourne, Andover, Hampshire, England
- Awards: Royal Medal (1896); Duddell Medal and Prize 1924); Rumford Medal (1924); Elliott Cresson Medal (1939)
- Scientific career
- Fields: Physics

Sir Charles Vernon Boys, FRS (15 March 1855 – 30 March 1944) was a British physicist, known for his careful and innovative experimental work in the fields of thermodynamics and high-speed photography, and as a popular science communicator through his books, inventions, and his public lectures for children.

== Early life ==
Boys was the eighth child of the Reverend Charles Boys, the Anglican vicar of Wing, Rutland. He was educated at Marlborough College and the Royal School of Mines, where he learned physics from Frederick Guthrie and taught himself higher mathematics while completing a degree in mining and metallurgy. As a student at the School of Mines he invented a mechanical device (which he called the "integraph") for plotting the integral of a function. He worked briefly in the coal industry before accepting Guthrie's offer of a position as "demonstrator."

== Experimental physics ==
Boys achieved recognition as a scientist for his invention of the fused quartz fibre torsion balance, which allowed him to measure extremely small forces. He made the fused quartz fibres for his instrument by attaching one end of a quartz rod to a crossbow quarrel, the other end to a fixed surface, heating the rod to the point of melting, and shooting the crossbow. This "drew out" the rod into a long thin string, often less than one micron in width, a fiber so thin it could not be resolved with an optical microscope of the time.

Boys used the quartz fibre torsion balance to produce a radiomicrometer capable of responding to the light of a single candle more than one mile away, and used that device for astronomical observations. He then used that same balance to improve upon Cavendish's measurement of the gravitational constant G. Boys published his measurement of G in 1894. His method was based on the same basic setup as Cavendish's, but with two masses suspended at one height and two nearby masses suspended at a different height, in order to minimise the unwanted interaction between opposite masses.

Boys was a critic of the solar engine design of Frank Shuman, which led to Shuman hiring him as a technical consultant. Together they patented a "Sun-Boiler", which is similar to modern day parabolic trough solar power plants.

He also worked on high-speed photography and invented a device (the "Boys camera") that allowed him to observe in some detail what occurs during a lightning strike. According to the Feynman Lectures,

The first evidence of what happens in a lightning stroke was obtained in photographs taken with a camera held by hand and moved back and forth with the shutter open—while pointed toward a place where lightning was expected. The first photographs obtained this way showed clearly that lightning strokes are usually multiple discharges along the same path. Later, the "Boys" camera, which has two lenses mounted 180° apart on a rapidly rotating disc, was developed. The image made by each lens moves across the film—the picture is spread out in time. If, for instance, the stroke repeats, there will be two images side by side. By comparing the images of the two lenses, it is possible to work out the details of the time sequence of the flashes.

— R. P. Feynman, "Electricity in the Atmosphere", Feynman Lectures on Physics, vol. II, ch. 9 (1964)

== Public service and educational works ==
In 1897 Boys became a Metropolitan Gas Referee, charged with assessing a fair price for coal gas. He initially worked on the replacement of the standard candle, used to determine the quality of the gas for lighting, by the Harcourt pentane lamp. As heating grew to become the principal use of coal gas, Boys undertook fundamental work on calorimetry to measure and record the heat content of the gas, achieving a substantial increase in precision of measurement. At this time the national gas bill for the United Kingdom was fifty million pounds, so a one-percent correction to the bill represented a very significant amount of money.

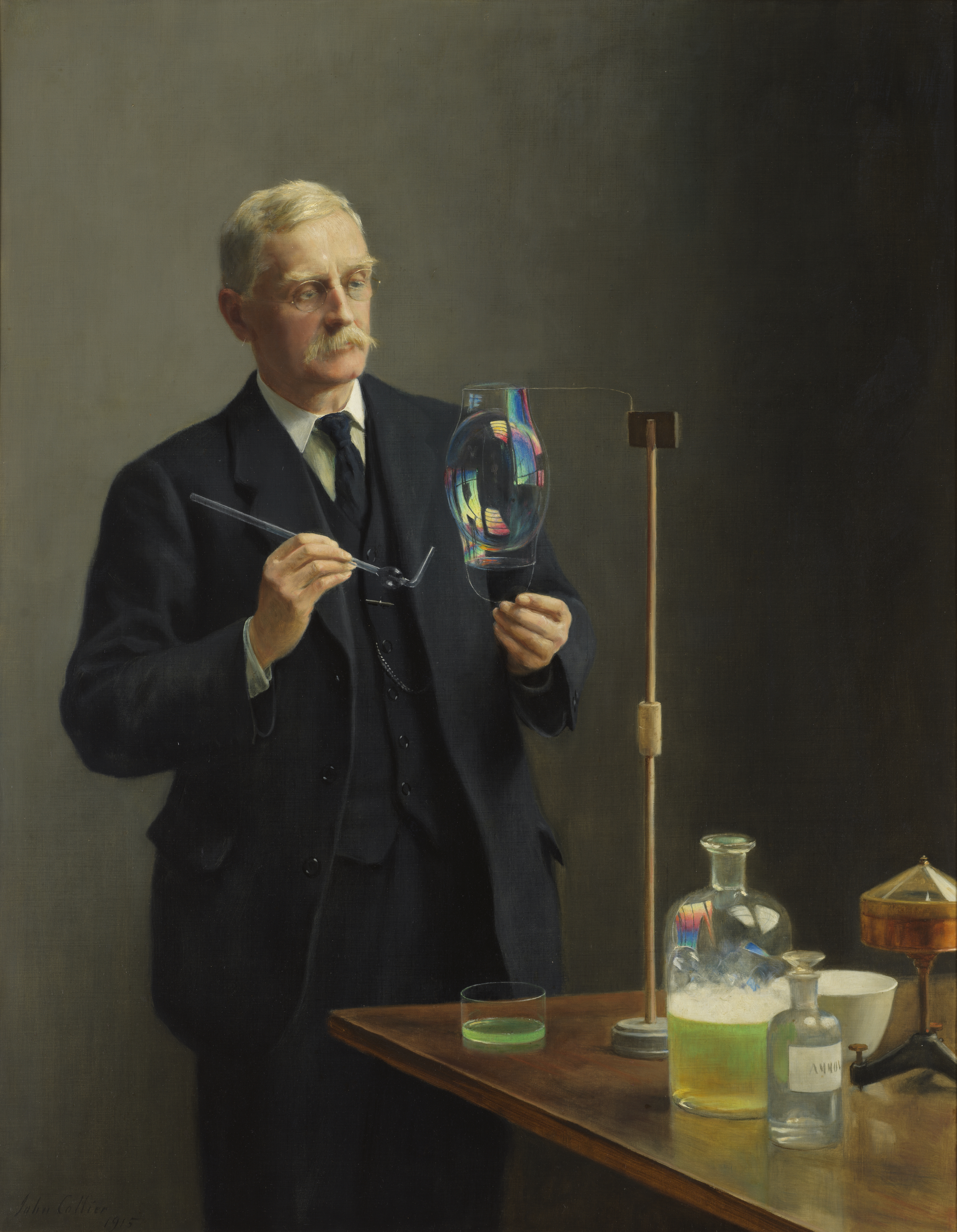
Portrait of Charles Vernon Boys, 1915, by John Collier, demonstrating his work with soap bubbles.

Boys conducted public lectures on the properties of soap films, which were gathered into the book Soap Bubbles: Their Colours and the Forces Which Mould Them, a classic of scientific popularisation. The first edition of Soap Bubbles appeared in 1890 and the second in 1911; it has remained in print to this day. The book deeply impressed French writer Alfred Jarry, who in 1898 wrote the absurdist novel Exploits and Opinions of Dr. Faustroll, Pataphysician, in which the title character, who was born at the age of 63 and sails in a sieve, is described as a friend of C.V. Boys (see also 'Pataphysics). The book was also a favourite of American poet Elizabeth Bishop.

== Recognition ==
Boys was an assistant professor at the Royal College of Science (now Imperial College London) in South Kensington from 1889 to 1897, as well as an examiner at the University of London. In 1899 he presented the Royal Institution Christmas Lectures. He was elected to the Royal Society in 1888 and knighted in 1935. He was awarded the Royal Medal in 1896 and the Rumford Medal in 1924. He was awarded the Elliott Cresson Medal in 1939.

== Other Positions held ==
- President of the Physical Society 1916–17
- President of the Rontgen Society 1906–07

== Personal life ==
Boys married Marion Amelia Pollock in 1892, and the couple had two children. Boys was granted a divorce in 1910 on the grounds that Marion had been having an adulterous affair with mathematician Andrew Forsyth. This caused a scandal that forced Forsyth to resign his chair at the University of Cambridge. Marion and Forsyth were then wed, but Boys never remarried.

Aside from his serious contributions to science, Boys was known to be a remarkably colourful and well-liked man. He enjoyed playing practical jokes; one of his favourite pastimes was blowing perfectly-timed bubbles and smoke rings out of his office window so they would engulf people passing by. There are also reports that exhibited several unconventional behaviours; he was known to drink his tea from a saucer if it was too hot, and on at least one occasion, attempted to hide a stain on his shirt by tucking sheets of paper behind his waistcoat. He also had several of his award medals, including his Royal Medal, melted down to help fund the education of students at his alma mater, Marlborough College. His personal interests included gardening and biology.

Boys began losing his eyesight later in life, and died at his home at age 89 in St Mary Bourne, Andover in Hampshire on 30 March 1944.
