= Frank Shuman =

American inventor, engineer and solar energy pioneer (1862-1918)

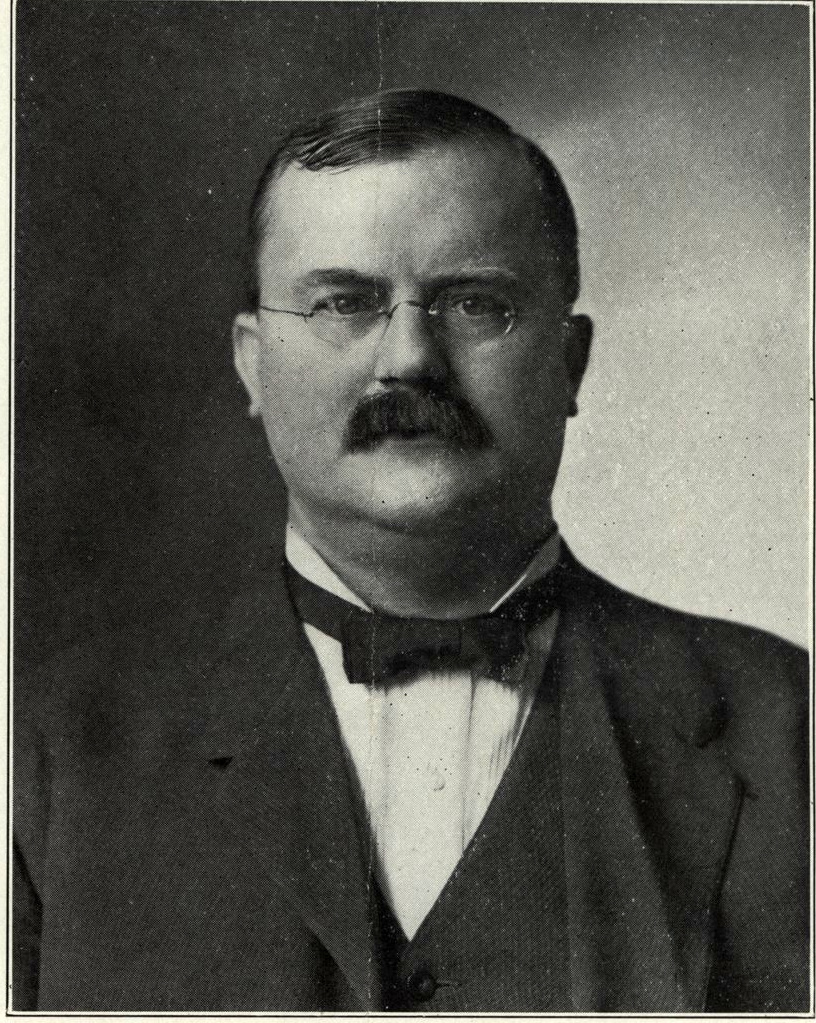
- Shuman in 1907
- Born: January 23, 1862; Brooklyn, New York, U.S.
- Died: April 28, 1918 (aged 56); Tacony, Philadelphia
- Education: Self-educated
- Occupations: Inventor; engineer
- Known for: Safety glass; Solar energy

Shuman sunengine on the March 1916 cover of Hugo Gernsback's The Electrical Experimenter

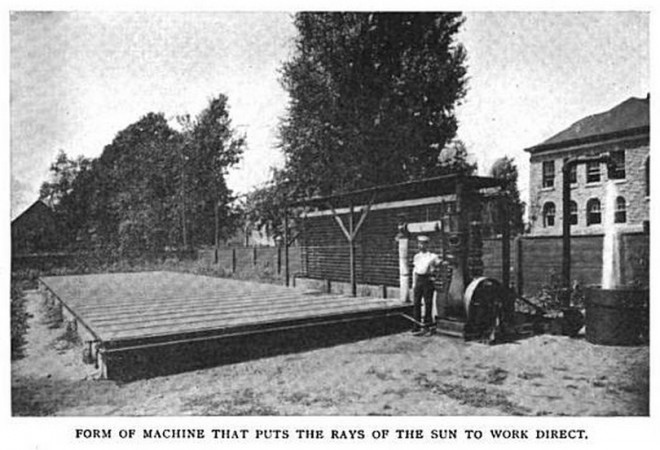
Shuman sunengine 1907 Photo: Technical World magazine, September 1907

Frank Shuman (/ˈʃuːmən/; January 23, 1862 – April 28, 1918) was an American inventor, engineer and solar energy pioneer known for his work on solar engines, especially those that used solar energy to heat water that would produce steam.

== Early life ==
Shuman was born in 1862 in Brooklyn, New York. At 18, he forwent college to work as a chemist at an aniline dye company in West Virginia. In 1891 he moved to Philadelphia to work with his uncle, Frank Schumann, who had kept the original German spelling of the family name. Schumann was president of Tacony Iron & Metal Works, the company contracted to cast the statue of William Penn for the Philadelphia City Hall, and Shuman was assigned with devising a method of electroplating the statue with layers of protective aluminium.

== Career ==
In 1892, Frank Shuman was granted a patent for his invention of wired safety glass. Additional patents were issued relating to the process of making wire glass and machines for making wire glass. In 1914 Shuman invented a process for making laminated safety glass, called safety glass, and manufactured by the Safety Glass Company. In 1916 he patented a "Danger Signal" for railroad crossings, as well as the use of liquid oxygen or liquid air to propel a submarine.

On August 20, 1897, Shuman invented a solar engine that worked by reflecting solar energy onto one-foot square boxes filled with ether, which has a lower boiling point than water, and containing black pipes on the inside, which in turn powered a toy steam engine. The tiny steam engine operated continuously for over two years on sunny days next to a pond at the Shuman house.

In 1908 Shuman formed the Sun Shine Power Company with the intent to build larger power plants. He, along with his technical advisor A.S.E. Ackermann and British physicist Sir Charles Vernon Boys, developed an improved system using mirrors to reflect solar energy upon collector boxes, increasing heating capacity so much that water could now be used instead of ether. He also developed a low-pressure steam turbine, since most 1910 vintage steam engines were built for steam and not sun-heated water. Shuman's turbine processed energy four times faster than any engine of his day. Shuman then constructed a full-scale steam engine that was powered by low-pressure steam, enabling him to patent the entire solar engine system by 1912. Scientific American again featured Shuman in its issues of February 4, 1911, and September 30, 1911.

Shuman built the world’s first solar thermal power station in Maadi, Egypt (1912-1913). Shuman’s plant used semi circle shaped troughs to power a 60-70 horsepower engine that pumped 6,000 gallons of water per minute from the Nile River to adjacent cotton fields. His system included a number of technological improvements, including absorption plates with dual panes separated by a one-inch air space. Although the outbreak of World War I and the discovery of cheap oil in the 1930s discouraged the advancement of solar energy, Shuman’s vision and basic design were resurrected in the 1970s with a new wave of interest in solar thermal energy.

We have proved the commercial profit of sun power in the tropics and have more particularly proved that after our stores of oil and coal are exhausted the human race can receive unlimited power from the rays of the sun.

— Frank Shuman, New York Times, July 2, 1916

Shuman died in his home on Disston Street in Tacony in 1918. His large home and laboratories still stand in the Tacony section of Philadelphia, as an apartment house and garages. They were added to the historic register in October 2019, meaning they cannot be demolished or significantly altered without the Historical Commission's permission.

== Patents ==
Shuman's US Patent 1240890 for a sun boiler

Number	Date filed	Issue date	Description
D37803	December 18, 1905	January 30, 1906	Design for Sheet-Glass
D43349	August 19, 1910	December 17, 1912	Design for Sheet-Glass
483020	July 6, 1892	September 20, 1892	Process of Embedding Wire-Netting in Glass
483021	July 6, 1892	September 20, 1892	Machine for Embedding Wire-Netting in Glass
510716	September 22, 1893	December 12, 1893	Machine for Embedding Wire in Glass
510822	December 29, 1892	December 12, 1893	Process of Manufacturing Wire-Glass
510823	December 29, 1892	December 12, 1893	Machine for Manufacturing Wire-Glass
531874	July 5, 1894	January 1, 1895	Process of Cutting Wire-Embedded Glass
542539	November 14, 1894	July 9, 1895	Apparatus for Removing Obstructions from Car-Tracks
545826	May 3, 1894	September 3, 1895	Ladle for Dipping Glass
546196	May 28, 1894	September 10, 1895	Apparatus for Embedding Wire in Glass
561920	November 14, 1892	June 9, 1896	Machine for Embedding Wire in Glass
574458	November 23, 1893	January 5, 1897	Machine for Embedding Wire in Glass
593440	September 17, 1896	November 9, 1897	Process of Treating Metal Structures
605754	January 20, 1896	June 14, 1898	Process of and Machine for Embedding Wire in Glass
647334	July 21, 1897	April 10, 1900	Process of Making Rolls
661649^{b}	July 21, 1900	November 13, 1900	Mercerizing-Machine
670438^{a}	September 20, 1900	March 26, 1901	Machine for Molding Glass
671240	October 13, 1900	April 2, 1901	Process of Extinguishing Fires
673067	September 20, 1900	April 30, 1901	Mercerizing-Machine
727004^{a}	June 14, 1902	May 5, 1903	Meshed Wire for Wire-Glass Manufacture
727005^{a}	June 14, 1902	May 5, 1903	Manufacture of Wire-Glass
727006^{a}	June 14, 1902	May 5, 1903	Method of Manufacturing Wire-Glass
727007^{a}	June 14, 1902	May 5, 1903	Process of Manufacturing Wire-Glass
733286	January 13, 1903	July 7, 1903	Removable Pile for Forming Concrete Piles
733287	April 23, 1903	July 7, 1903	Process of Making Concrete Piles
733288	January 13, 1903	July 7, 1903	Removable Pile for Forming Concrete Piling
733335	June 4, 1903	July 7, 1903	Process of Forming Openings in the Ground
733336	April 23, 1903	July 7, 1903	Process of Forming Concrete Piles
733337	April 23, 1903	July 7, 1903	Process of Forming Concrete Piles
735680	April 23, 1903	August 4, 1903	Process of Making Concrete Piles
739268	June 8, 1903	September 15, 1903	Process of Making Concrete Piles
752003	April 23, 1903	February 9, 1904	Process of Forming Concrete Piles
756805	January 13, 1903	April 5, 1904	Removable Pile for Forming Concrete Piling
763212	February 5, 1904	June 21, 1904	Preparatory Pile for Use in Forming Concrete Piles
763213	February 25, 1904	June 21, 1904	Method of Forming Concrete Piles
786058	April 7, 1904	March 28, 1905	Process of Manufacturing Wire-Glass
792172^{a}	March 20, 1905	June 13, 1905	Process of Making Wire-Glass
805936	January 9, 1905	November 28, 1905	Concrete Piling and Method for Making the Same
806755	April 21, 1904	December 5, 1905	Pile for Piers or Pier Casings
806587	April 21, 1904	December 5, 1905	Pier and Pier Casing
817595	April 21, 1904	September 18, 1906	Setting Concrete Piles
831481	July 26, 1905	April 10, 1906	Constructing Piles
875857	June 14, 1902	January 7, 1908	Method for the Manufacture of Wire-Glass
876307	June 14, 1902	January 7, 1908	Method for the Manufacture of Wire-Glass
889341	July 20, 1897	June 2, 1908	Roll and Process for Making Same
898517	May 31, 1906	September 15, 1908	Concrete Pile and the Process of Constructing the Same
899339^{b}	December 22, 1905	September 22, 1908	Extracting Grease and Potash Salts from Wool
899440^{b}	December 29, 1905	September 22, 1908	Apparatus for Extracting Grease and Potash Salts from Wool
905469^{a}	March 20, 1905	December 1, 1908	Wire-Glass Structure
957477	March 20, 1905	May 10, 1910	Method of and Means of Annealing Glass
979579	March 18, 1907	December 27, 1910	Utilizing Waste Heat of Compressors
992814	May 1, 1907	May 23, 1911	Utilizing Waste Heat of Distillation
1002768	July 20, 1907	September 5, 1911	Utilizing Heat for the Development of Power
1014418	December 13, 1907	January 9, 1912	Process for Utilizing Waste Heat of Distillation
1156186	March 7, 1906	October 12, 1915	Method of Making Composite Piles
1167944	July 20, 1909	January 11, 1916	Method of and Means for Melting Metals
1200893	January 9, 1914	October 10, 1916	Steam-Engine
1218219	March 9, 1910	March 6, 1917	Steam-Engine
1240890^{c}	September 30, 1912	September 25, 1917	Sun-Boiler
1258482	October 2, 1915	March 5, 1918	Pile Form and Method of Driving the Same
1281860	October 2, 1915	October 15, 1918	Apparatus for Forming Piles
1310253	February 25, 1916	July 15, 1919	Submarine and Method of Operating the Same
1420345	March 23, 1916	June 20, 1922	Danger Signal

^{a} with Arno Shuman
^{b} with Constantine Shuman
^{c} with Charles Vernon Boys

== Shuman Rediscovered: Hemauer and Keller ==
At the 11th International Cairo Biennial of Contemporary Art in 2008-09, the Swiss artists couple Christina Hemauer and Roman Keller drew attention to Shuman's Sun Project. Their contribution entitled "No1 Sun Engine" consisted of two parts: apart from a reconstruction of two segments of the solar engines, they built a stand providing information on Shuman's project and on solar energy in general. On the wall behind the information stand, there was a quote (in both English and Arabic) by Shuman: “One thing I feel sure of, and that is that the human race must finally utilize direct sun power or revert to barbarism.” Frank Shuman, 1914
