= Tacony, Philadelphia =

Tacony tèkhane
- Neighborhood of Philadelphia
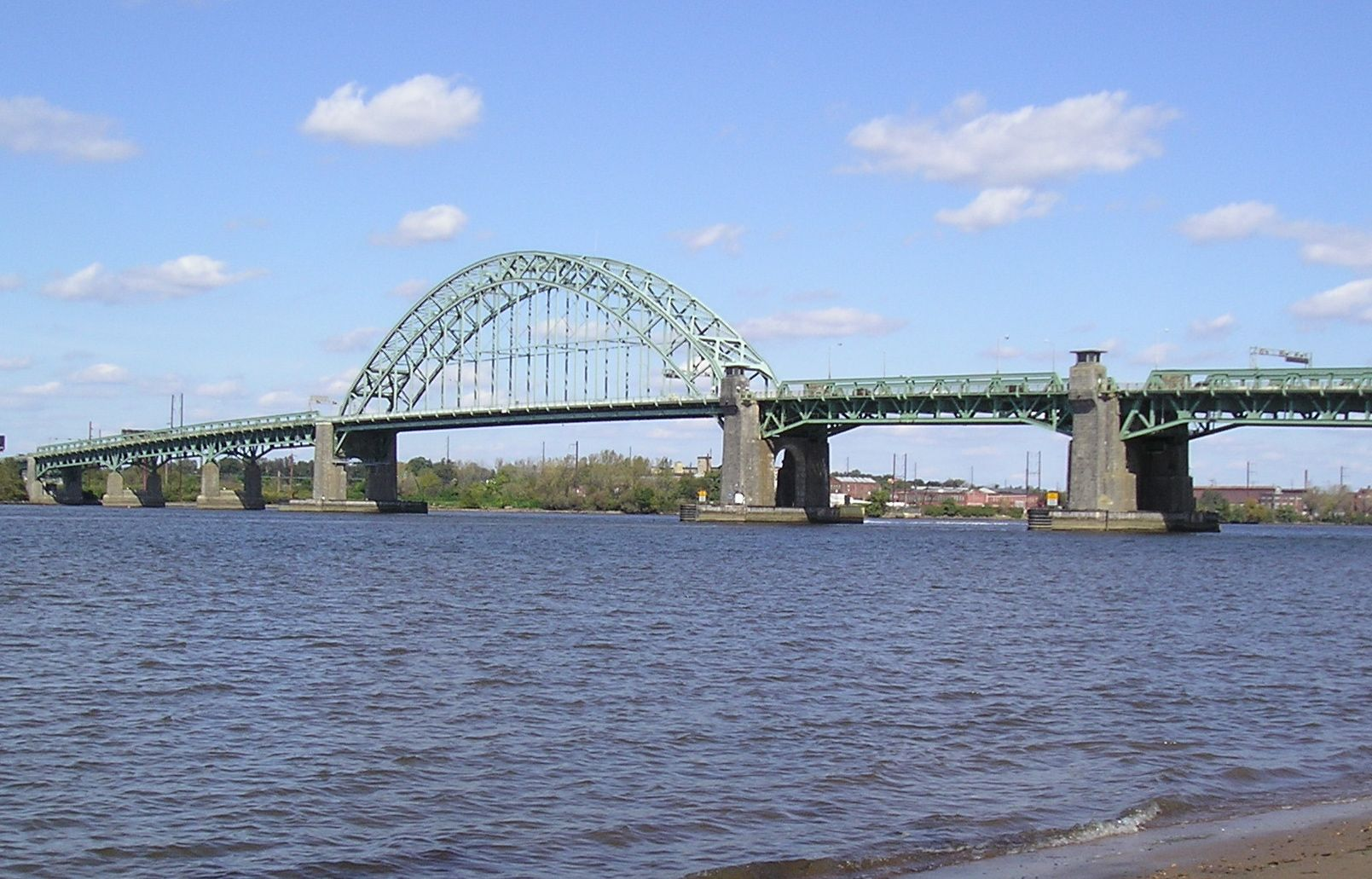
- Tacony–Palmyra Bridge as seen from the New Jersey shoreline looking at Tacony

- Location within Philadelphia
- Coordinates: 40.027°N 75.043°W
- Country: United States
- State: Pennsylvania
- County: Philadelphia County
- City: Philadelphia

Population (2010)
  - Total: 15,675
- Area codes: 215, 267 and 445

Tacony (Delaware: tèkhane) is a historic neighborhood in Northeast Philadelphia, United States, approximately 8 miles (13 km) from downtown ("Center City") Philadelphia. It is bounded by the east side of Frankford Avenue on the northwest, the south side of Cottman Avenue on the northeast, the north side of Robbins Street on the southwest, and the Delaware River and Interstate 95 on the southeast.

Tacony's ZIP code, along with Wissinoming, is 19135. The neighborhood has a large Irish American and Italian American population. A substantial influx of German and German-American inhabitants helped to swell the population after 1855. About 23,000 people now live in Tacony.

Although numerous neighborhood borders in Philadelphia are often disputed, because of when and how they developed, were populated, and founded, Tacony is one of the earliest villages along the Delaware River and further inland, in what was at one time a section of "Oxford Township," and would eventually become part of Philadelphia. For that reason it has some of the better defined neighborhood borders which are part of the city records that describe neighborhoods.

== History ==
The name "Tacony" is derived from a Lenape word for "wilderness", it may possibly originate from the Lenape word tèkëne meaning forest or woods. The deed for the land purchase of Hans Kyn (later "Keene" and "Keen"), a Swede, south of modern Cottman Avenue on the river, dated April 26, 1679, entered on the back of a grant from Governor Andros, March 25, 1676, is still in possession of the family. Enock Keene is shown as one of the landowners of Toaconinck Township on Thomas Holme's 1687 survey map.

John Keen, great-great grandson of Hans, born at Tacony in 1747, served with General Cadwalader in the Revolutionary War and was wounded at the battle of Princeton. Tacony resident John Lardner crossed the Delaware with General Washington and fought at Trenton, Princeton, Brandywine, and Germantown. Farmer John Knowles fought in the war and was a prisoner of the British in 1778.

In the 18th and 19th centuries, wealthy and influential families established country seats along the river in Tacony. The British Army raided several farms and estates there for supplies during its Revolutionary War occupation of Philadelphia in 1777-78. Not yet a part of the City of Philadelphia, Tacony was then a village in Oxford Township, Philadelphia County.

By at least 1836, the Buttermilk Tavern, a vacation hotel, offering fresh catch for dinner, was operating along the river south of what became Longshore Street.

=== Coming of the railroad ===
The most significant event in the development of Tacony was the acquisition of land there in 1846 for a ferry-wharf by the Philadelphia and Trenton Railroad, which had first laid tracks through the town in 1834, along the route from its depot at modern Frankford Avenue and Montgomery Avenue, Kensington, to Trenton, New Jersey. Banned from traversing the District of Kensington southbound to connect with other rail lines, the Philadelphia and Trenton built Tacony Depot, an important early transportation hub. The depot and the community which grew around it was, for a short time, called Buena Vista, named for the recent Mexican War victory. A waterfront mansion on the property was converted to the Washington House Hotel at the foot of what would become Disston Street. Through passengers traveling from New York de-trained at Tacony and took a steamboat to Walnut Street, where they could connect with stagecoaches and other rail lines. North-bound passengers did the reverse. Steamboats and steam ferries stopped at Tacony several times a day for over eight decades. The railroad's Kensington Depot continued to be used for freight and some passenger traffic, but the steamboat transfer continued until 1867, when the Connecting Railway opened from Frankford Junction to Mantua, near the Philadelphia Zoo, enabling a connection with the Pennsylvania Railroad.

Between 1861 and 1865, Tacony Depot was the major conduit for soldiers from New England, New York, and New Jersey traveling to and from the campaigns of the Civil War, greatly adding to the village's name recognition.

German-American Catholics formed the Saint Vincent's Orphan Asylum Society in 1855. They purchased 49 acres (200,000 m^{2}) from two farmers and William H. Gatzmer's land association, comprising an area from Princeton Avenue to Cottman Avenue, the railroad to the river. They formed the Tacony Cottage Association, and sub-divided the land into building lots which they sold to cover the establishment of St. Vincent’s Orphanage at the foot of St. Vincent Street.

In 1854, the City of Philadelphia consolidated the surrounding county into the city and Tacony became one of its neighborhoods.

In 1871, the Philadelphia and Trenton’s right-of-way was leased to the mammoth Pennsylvania Railroad and became the most important connection in that system, the Philadelphia-to-New York section of today's Northeast Corridor.

=== Ships named for Tacony ===
Three vessels named "Tacony" saw naval duty, one of them for the South during the Civil War. In 1863, Confederate forces captured the merchant vessel Tacony and used it as a stealth raider, CSS ''Florida No.2'', to capture 15 additional ships. It was burned when the crew upgraded to a larger vessel. A 2004 book, "Seawolf of the Confederacy," chronicles its exploits. Also in 1863, a gunboat named Tacony, built at the Philadelphia Navy Yard, was commissioned and saw blockade duty against the South. During World War I, a sizeable yacht owned by industrialist Jacob Disston was donated to the government for the length of the war. It was refitted, armed, and assigned to coastal patrol duty as USS Tacony.

== Disston moves to Tacony ==
In 1872, industrialist Henry Disston, seeing, among other things, easy access to river and railroad, purchased 390 acres (1.6 km^{2}) in Tacony and moved his growing saw and file manufactory, Disston Saw Works, to Tacony from cramped quarters in Kensington. (Henry's brother had earlier purchased vacation property from the Cottage Association.) The company became the largest of its kind in the world for a century, employing up to 5,000 workers at one time. A Time article claimed in 1940 that 75 percent of the handsaws sold in the U.S. were made by Disston.

West of the railroad, Disston built a paternalistic industrial village which has been the subject of books, academic studies, and Papal and government recognition. Disston is still regarded with reverence in the community and his image figures prominently on a large community mural. Tacony thrived during the industrial age as national and international firms opened branches there. The Tacony Iron Company manufactured the dome of Philadelphia City Hall and the massive statue of William Penn that it supports.

In 1894, Frank Shuman, inventor of wire glass and a pioneer in solar power twice featured on the cover of Scientific American built a large inventor's compound on Disston Street and there built the first solar-powered steam engine. From experiments conducted there, he later developed solar-powered steam turbines to irrigate land in Egypt.

== Tacony Palmyra Bridge ==
The Tacony-Palmyra Bridge, one of only two Delaware River spans connecting New Jersey with northeast Philadelphia (the other being the Betsy Ross Bridge further downstream), has its Pennsylvania terminus in Tacony. The bridge, which carries Pennsylvania Route 73, connects with New Jersey Route 73 in Palmyra, New Jersey. It opened in 1929, eliminating the need for ferries, used on that route since 1922. Daily use, 50,000 vehicles; 18.25 million per year.

== Notable people ==
- Chris Daukaus — UFC heavyweight fighter
- Henry Disston — industrialist, founded Keystone Saw Works in 1840
- Hamilton Disston — industrialist and real-estate developer
- Chick Hartley — Major League Baseball outfielder who played in one game for the New York Giants in 1902
- Frank Legacki — championship swimmer
- Al Schmid — United States Marine who was awarded the Navy Cross
- Frank Shuman — inventor, engineer and solar energy pioneer

== Notable buildings ==
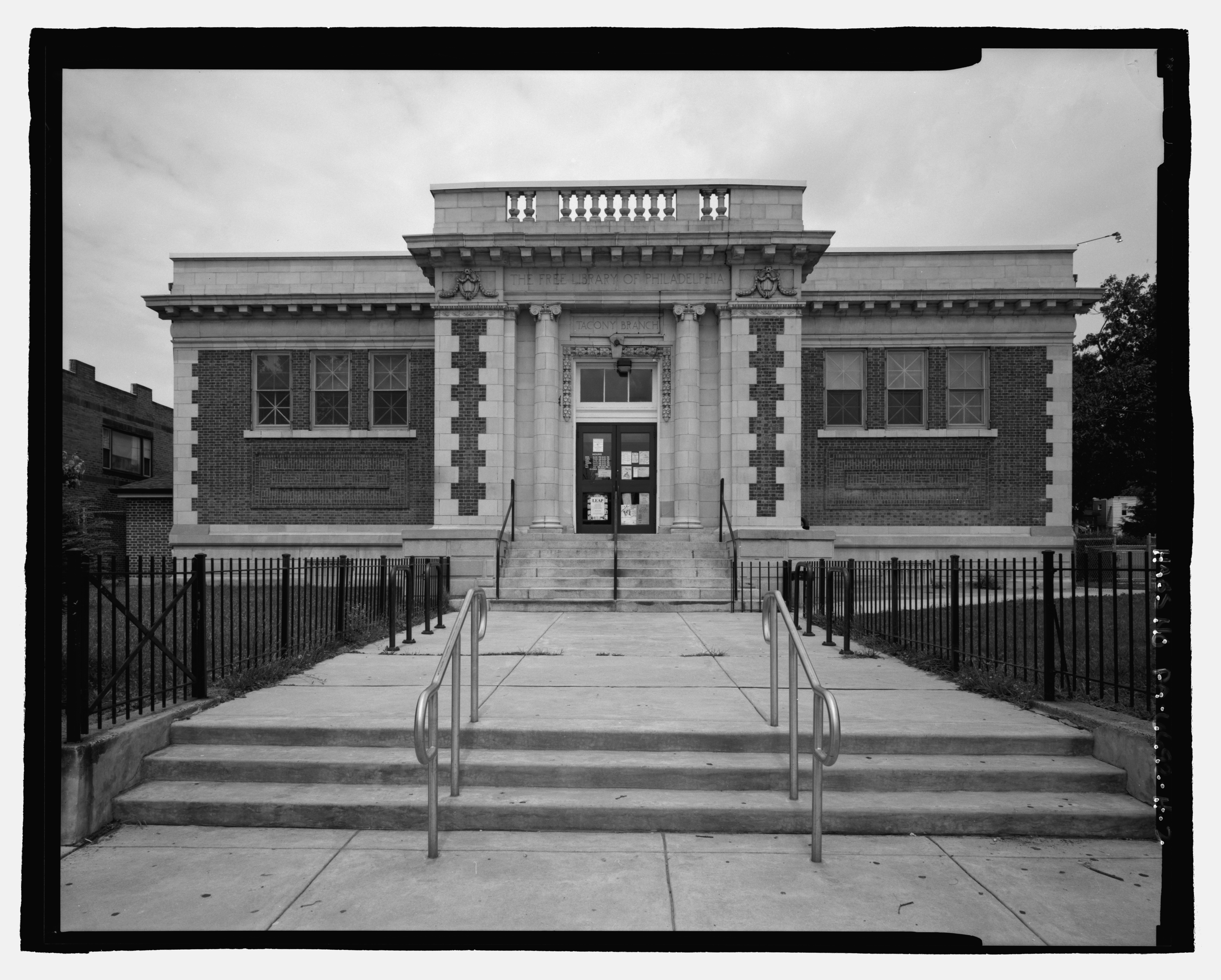
Tacony Branch Library

The Hamilton Disston School, Mary Disston School, and Tacony Music Hall are listed on the National Register of Historic Places.

The Tacony Library opened November 27, 1906. The land was a gift of the Disston Family, and the building was a gift of Andrew Carnegie.

Important historic industrial complexes survive on the Delaware River waterfront, including:

- Disston Saw Works
- Tacony Worked Mills, 5250 Unruh Avenue, Tacony, Philadelphia, PA, 1886, designed by Walter Harvey Geissinger, a prolific architect of industrial buildings in Philadelphia, who founded a firm that eventually became known as The Ballinger Company.

== Parks and Recreation Centers ==
The following are located within the boundaries of Tacony: Joseph F. Vogt Playground, Disston Park, Disston Recreation Center, Franklin Delano Roosevelt Playground, Frank J. G. Dorsey Memorial Playground, Senator William Vincent Mullin Playground, and Lardner's Point Park.

== Sports teams ==
=== Disston AA ===
The Disston AA FC, nicknamed "The Sawmakers" was a U.S. soccer team sponsored by the Disston Saw Works from 1909 to 1921. The team played for several years in local Philadelphia leagues before joining the National Association Football League. It was a perennial contender in both league and cup play.

== Sources ==
- Silcox, Harry C. (1994). A Place to Live and Work: The Henry Disston Saw Works and the Tacony Community of Philadelphia. University Park, Pennsylvania: The Pennsylvania State University Press. ISBN 0-271-01079-7.
