= National Intelligence Bureau =

The National Intelligence Bureau may refer to:

- National Intelligence Bureau (Japan)
- State Intelligence Service (Sri Lanka), whose previous name was the National Intelligence Bureau
