= Net insurance benefit =

Net Insurance Benefits (NIBs) in their simplest forms, are the profits from a portfolio of life insurance policies.

NIB is a term used in the life settlement industry to describe the net cash flows from a portfolio of life contingent assets commonly structured to pool assets together for purposes of diversification, favorable tax treatment, or other desirable portfolio characteristics.

Often, but not always, the underlying assets in an NIB are combined with other insurance products to produce a more attractive risk profile than the underlying assets by themselves.

The market value of a NIB can vary, depending on the presence or absence of certain underlying enhancements such as financing, reinsurance wraps, mortality protection products, or bank guarantees.
