= Tacony Music Hall =

- U.S. National Register of Historic Places
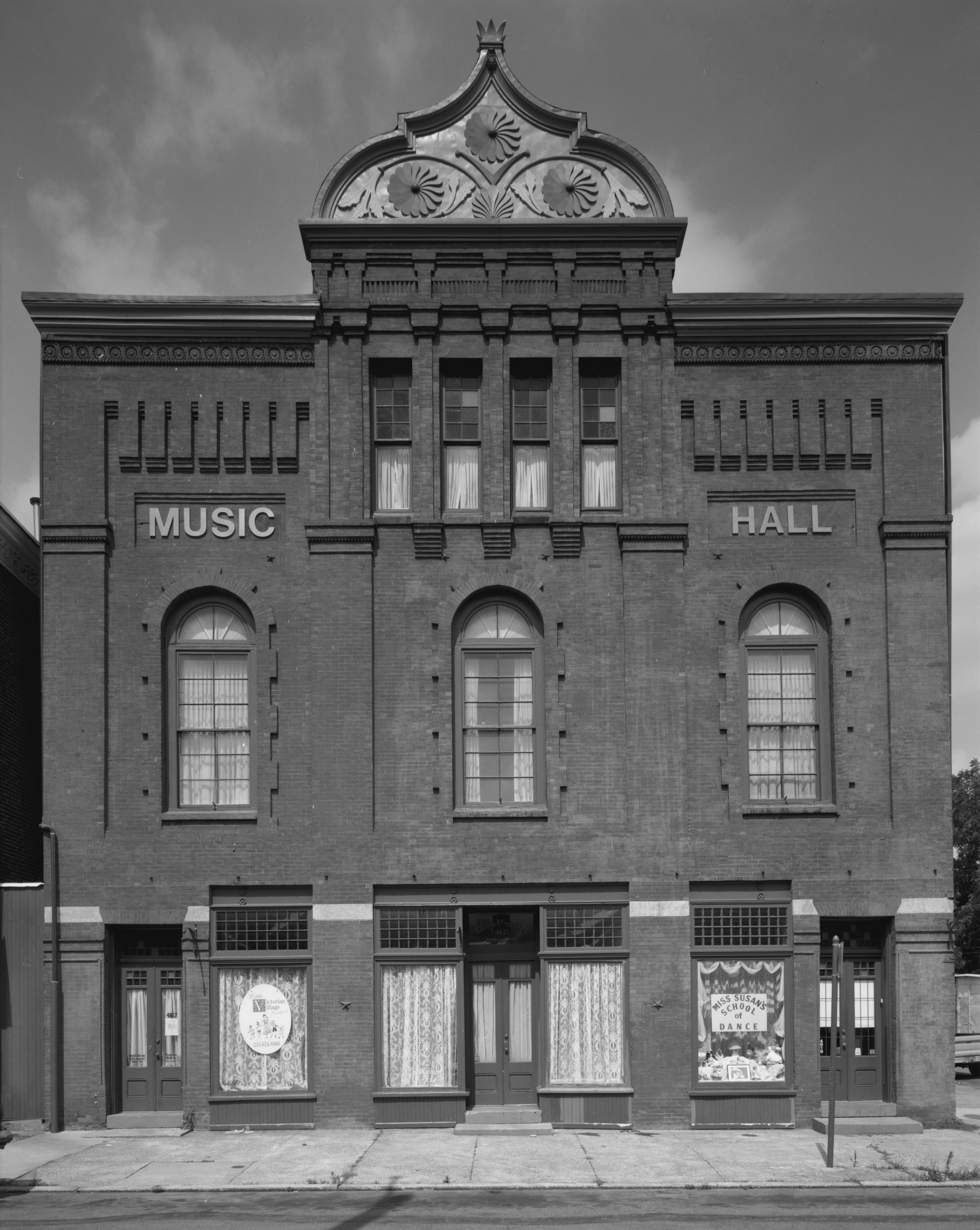

- Location within Philadelphia Location within Pennsylvania Location within the United States
- Location: 4815–4819 Longshore Ave. Philadelphia, Pennsylvania
- Coordinates: 40°1′28″N 75°2′33″W
- Area: 0.1 acres (0.040 ha)
- Built: 1885
- Architectural style: Romanesque
- NRHP reference No.: 90000413
- Added to NRHP: March 9, 1990

The Tacony Music Hall is an historic building that is located in the Tacony neighborhood of Philadelphia, Pennsylvania, United States.

The building was listed on the National Register of Historic Places in 1990.

== History and architectural features ==
This three-story brick building was erected in 1885 by Frank W. Jordan, a local druggist and entrepreneur, as a multi-use facility, with retail shop space on the first floor, an auditorium on the second, and space for the Keystone Scientific and Literary Association (founded 1876, later called the Disston Library and Free Reading Room) on the third.

P. T. Barnum and Susan B. Anthony lectured here. The building was listed on the National Register of Historic Places in 1990.

In March 2017, the building owners and operators began the process of opening a sex positive community center. Membership is limited to those over 18 years of age who may pay a membership or event fee and may sign a membership form or liability waiver. The second and third floors are used by this organization which is called Philly Music Hall LLC. They rejected the label of "sex club". Nevertheless, a spokesperson recognizes that "occasionally there will be people who have sex." Programming includes workshops, events, and community meetups to discuss and practice various forms of alternative sexuality. Participants are encouraged to practice active consent and safe sex, with failure to do so resulting in suspension or revocation of membership.

The center permanently closed in August 2020 as a result of the COVID-19 pandemic.
