= Henry Disston =

English American industrialist

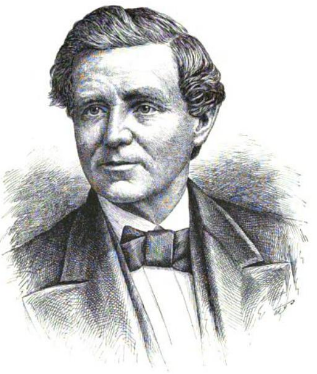
- Born: May 24, 1819; Tewkesbury, England
- Died: March 16, 1878 (aged 58); Philadelphia, Pennsylvania, United States
- Resting place: Laurel Hill Cemetery
- Occupation: Industrialist
- Spouses: Amanda Bickley; Mary Steelman (m. 1843)

Henry Disston (May 24, 1819 – March 16, 1878) was an English American industrialist who founded the Keystone Saw Works in 1840 and developed the surrounding Tacony neighborhood of Philadelphia to build housing for his workers. His company became the Disston Saw Works and was the top manufacturer of hand saws in the United States during the late 19th-century and early 20th century.

== Early life and rise to prominence ==
Disston was born May 24, 1819, in Tewkesbury, England. The family moved to Derby, when he was four for the father's work manufacturing machines that produced lace. His father invented a machine to make a special fine lace and was invited to introduce the machine to a mill in Albany, New York. He arrived in America, as a boy of 14 with his father and 16-year-old sister, Marianna. Three days after arriving in Philadelphia they were orphaned by the sudden death of their father. Henry Disston was taken in as a saw-maker's apprentice at Lindley, Johnson & Whitcraft. He left that company in 1840 and started his own saw-making business. He married Amanda Bickley but she died after giving birth to twins who only survived a few hours. He later remarried to Mary Steelman in 1843.

By 1850, Disston's saws were renowned in the United States, even compared against the English manufactures that were considered superior. Disston encouraged emigration from England to staff his factory with skilled workers. By 1859, Disston had 150 people working for him. During the American Civil War, a protective tariff on foreign manufactured goods helped expand Disston's enterprise, and despite a fire that ruined the factory, Disston prospered through the 1860s. During the war, Disston had success when he switched some production from saws to war supplies such as Sabers, bayonets and guns. Disston also became a supplier of steel to the William Cramp & Sons Shipbuilding Company which had switched their ship designs from wood to iron vessels and had become a main supplier of ships to the Union war effort.

== Move to Tacony ==
By 1871, Disston's saw mill had outgrown its factory and he moved the business to the outlying neighborhood of Tacony, in what is now Northeast Philadelphia. At the time, Tacony was a small outlying area of Philadelphia, but it was located near the railroad and the Delaware River, and provided Disston with room for his saw mill to grow. Disston constructed homes for his workers, and designed them in an effort to improve their surroundings from their former dwellings in Philadelphia. The Disston family owned more than 600 homes that were rented to workers and many others were built and sold to workers. This area of Tacony, known as the Disston Estate, was designed to bear Disston's imprint in the fashion of true Victorian utopianism.

In 1879, U.S. President Rutherford B. Hayes visited Philadelphia and toured the Disston Saw Works factory.

== Later life and death ==
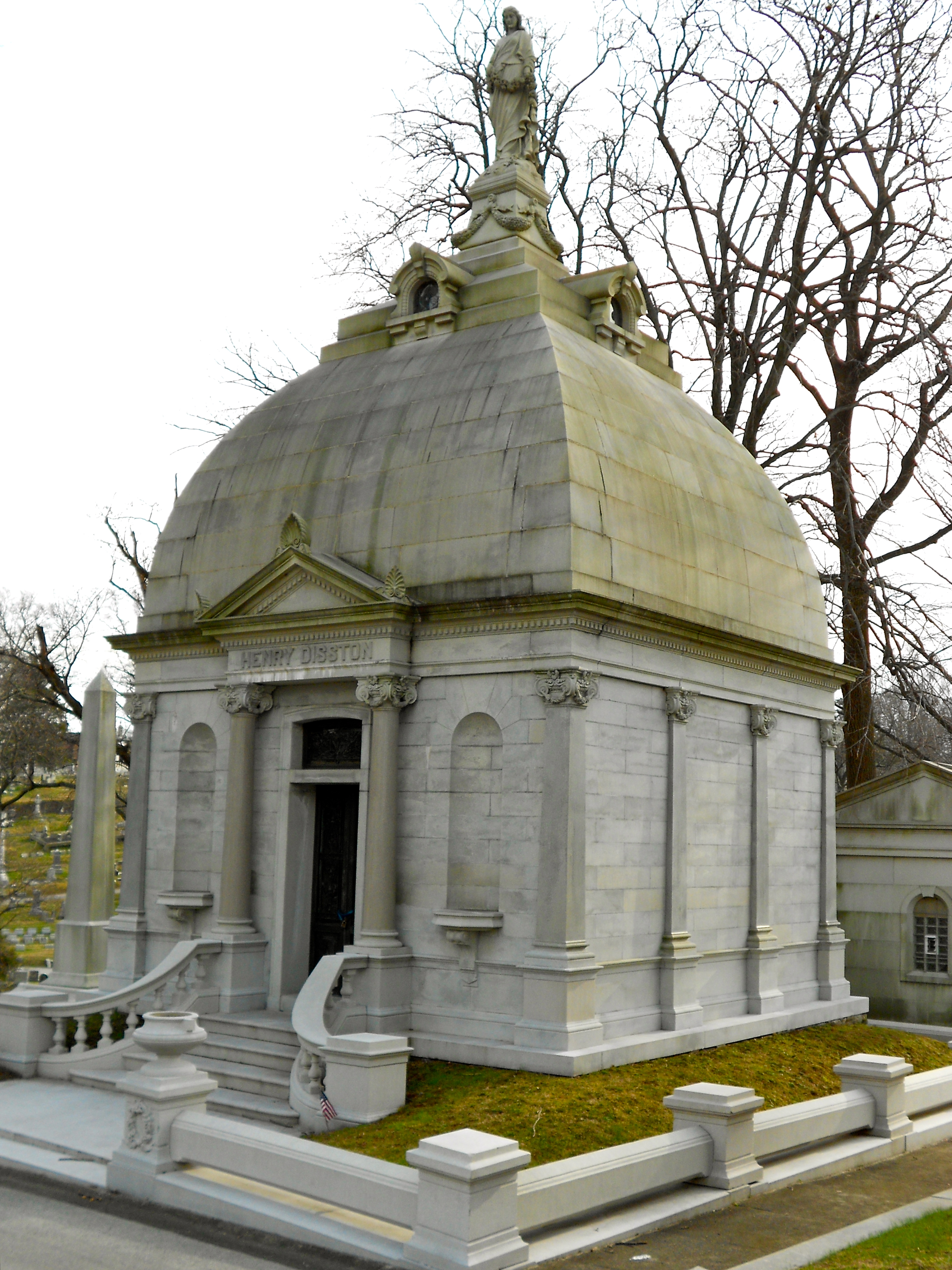
Disston mausoleum in Laurel Hill Cemetery

Disston was an early settler of Atlantic City, New Jersey. He built a summer cottage for his wife and multiple business such as a bakery, a coal and brick yard, and a saw mill.

By the late 1870s, Disston's business and social enterprises were succeeding, but his own health was failing. Despite his failing health, Disston generously supported the founding of a homeless shelter, Sunday Breakfast Rescue Mission. After falling ill in 1877, he suffered a cerebral haemorrhage and died at his home in Philadelphia on March 16, 1878. His oldest son, Hamilton Disston, succeeded him as president of the company.

Disston is buried at Laurel Hill Cemetery in the largest mausoleum in the cemetery.

== Sources ==
- Silcox, Harry C. (1994). A Place to Live and Work: The Henry Disston Saw Works and the Tacony Community of Philadelphia. University Park, Pennsylvania: The Pennsylvania State University Press. ISBN 0-271-01079-7.
