= Disston Saw Works =

American handsaw manufacturer

Coordinates: 40.0197°N 75.0417°W

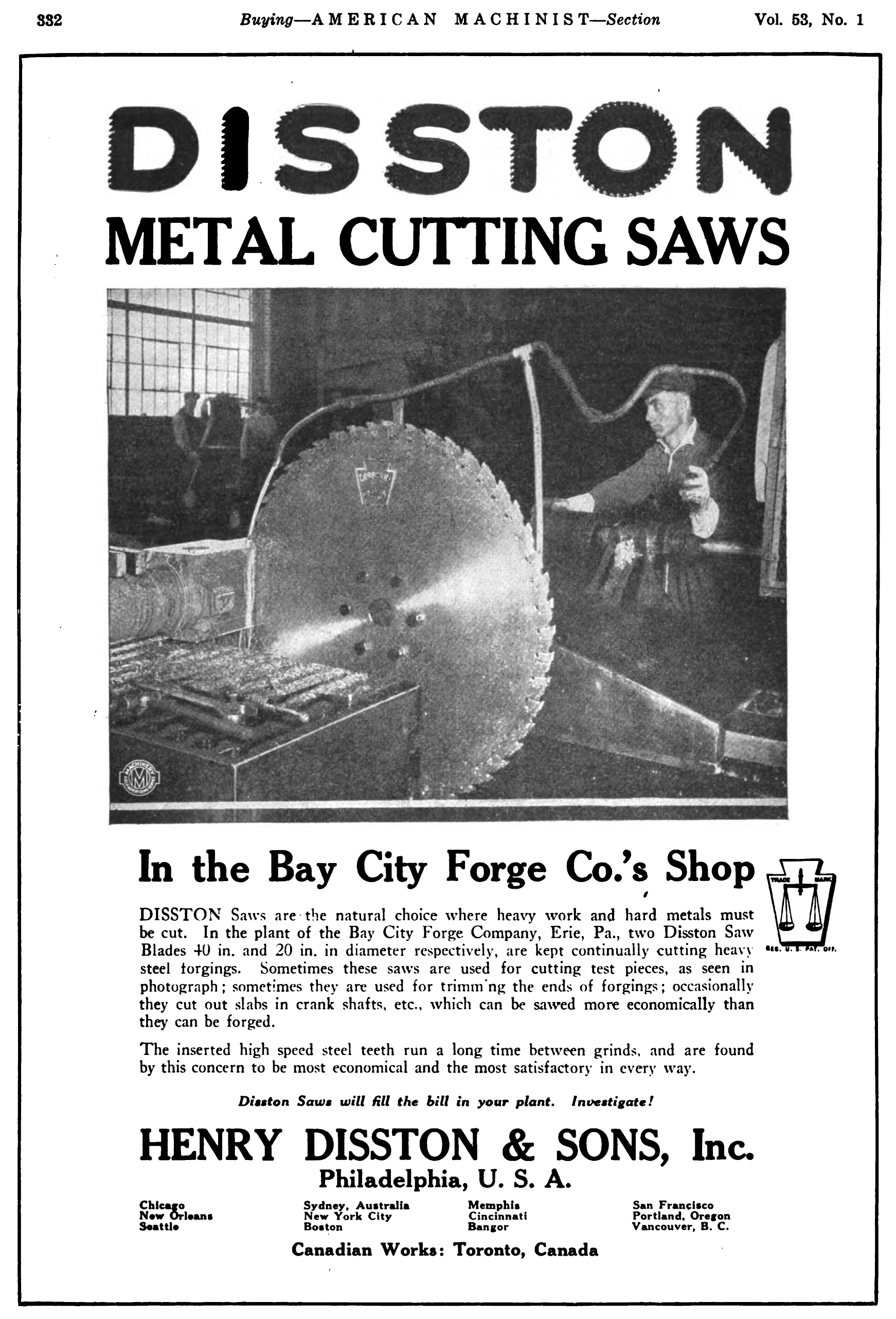
Henry Disston & Sons, Inc, saw blade advertisement in American Machinist, 1920.

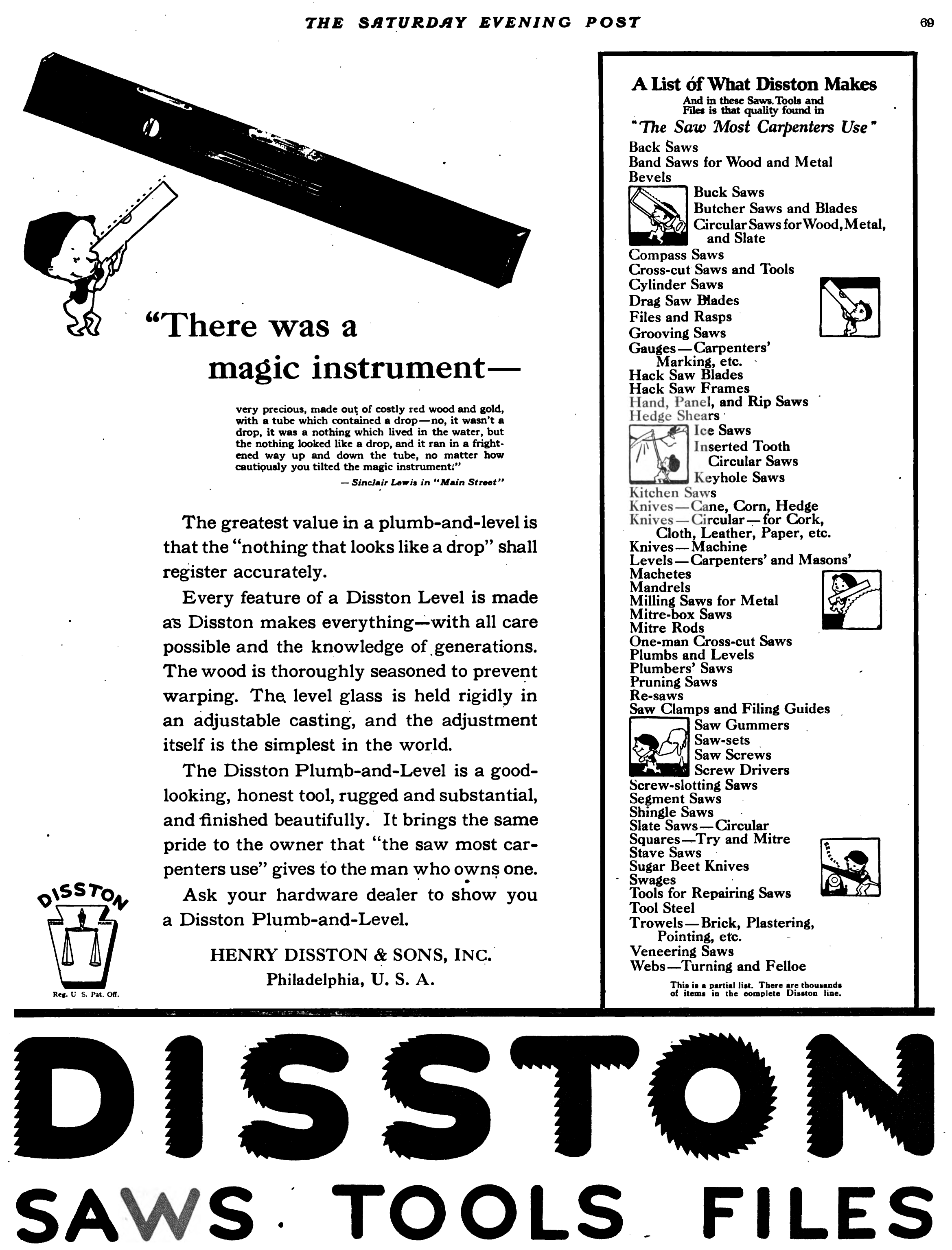
Henry Disston & Sons, Inc, advertisement in the Saturday Evening Post, 1921, listing the products offered by the company at the time.

Disston Saw Works was an American company owned by Henry Disston that manufactured handsaws during the mid-19th to early 20th century in the Tacony neighborhood of Philadelphia. The company was initially named Keystone Saw Works and then Henry Disston & Sons, Inc. Two successor companies are said to still exist, Disston Precision is still operational in Philadelphia, and Disston Tools in Chicopee, Massachusetts.

== History ==
The story of handsaws in the United States mirrors the technical and political development of steel. Sheffield, England, was the center of handsaw production during the 18th century and through most of the 19th century because of its fine steel and skilled craftsmen. England's political and economic lock on steel making in the colonies held American sawmakers at bay until well after the Revolutionary War. American steel producers could not compete until the Morrill Tariff leveled the playing field in 1861.

== Henry Disston ==
This was the environment in which young Henry Disston (1819–1878) began his career as an American sawmaker in Philadelphia. He had emigrated from England in 1833 and started making saws and squares in 1840. In 1850, he founded the company that would become the largest sawmaker in the world: the Keystone Saw Works.

Some five years later, Disston built a furnace—perhaps the first melting plant for steel in America—and began producing the first crucible saw steel ever made in the United States. While his competitors were buying good steel from Britain, he was making his own, to his own specification, for his own needs. Disston subsequently constructed a special rolling mill exclusively for saw blades.

Over the following decade, the Disston company continued to grow, even while dedicating itself to the Union Army's war effort. In 1865, when his son Hamilton Disston rejoined the business after serving in the Civil War, Disston changed the company's name to Henry Disston & Son. Henry Disston and his sons set the standards for American sawmakers, both in terms of producing high-quality saws and developing innovative manufacturing techniques. Disston also started making files in 1865.

In September 1872, Henry Disston and two other men dug part of the foundation for what was to become the largest saw manufacturing facility in the world: Disston Saw Works. This was in the Tacony section of Philadelphia. Having previously moved his expanding business from near Second and Market Streets to Front and Laurel Streets, Disston sought to establish his business away from this cramped area. It took over 25 years to move the entire facility to Tacony. This Philadelphia neighborhood seems to have been the only company town in the United States established within an existing city. At its peak of operations, Disston Saw Works employed 8,000 people and the factory covered 300 acres.

Henry Disston was renowned for having one of the first industries that exhibited environmental responsibility, as well as a paternalistic view towards his employees. For example, he had thousands of homes built in Tacony for his workmen. Funds to purchase these homes were made available through a building and loan association set up by the Disston firm. Mr. Disston was ready to grant any assistance needed to see to it that his workers could purchase a home, even if advances needed to be made.

Other examples of Henry Disston's caring influence on the community was evident in everyday life. To meet employees' cultural needs, a hall and a library were built with Henry Disston agreeing to pay a fixed sum towards its maintenance. The Tacony Music Hall was erected in 1885, also with the assistance of Disston money.

Henry Disston had fallen ill by 1877 and never truly recovered; he suffered a stroke and died the next year. This came only one and a half years after seeing his products receive the highest honors at the great Philadelphia Centennial Exposition of 1876. His vision of a working class community and the completion of the transfer of his enormous saw plant was carried out by his wife and his sons.

== Legacy ==
The company, known as Henry Disston and Sons, Inc by the early 20th century, cast the first crucible steel in the nation from an electric furnace in 1906. The firm's armor-plating building near Princeton Avenue and Milnor Street contributed tremendously to the World War II effort, building a volume of armor plates for steel tanks. (In the mid-1930s, Disston had provided the entire body for the Disston Tractor Tank, a fairly primitive light tank which was not a success.)

But the company's innovation and industriousness would not last forever. In 1955, with mounting cash-flow problems and waning interest on the family's part to run the firm, Henry Disston and Sons was sold to the H.K. Porter Company of Pittsburgh. Porter's Disston Division was sold in 1978 and became the Henry Disston Division of Sandvik Saw of Sweden. This division was then sold in 1984 to R.A.F. Industries of Philadelphia and became known as Disston Precision Incorporated, maker of specialized flat steel products. In 2013, R.A.F. Industries sold Disston Precision Inc. in a private sale. Although the company has ceased making Disston handsaws, the Disston brand name still exists in this firm.

== See also ==
- Disston A.A., an early soccer team sponsored by the company
- Disston, Oregon
