= South Florida Water Management District =

Regional governmental district in Florida, United States

District overview
- Formed: 1949
- Preceding District: Central and Southern Florida Flood Control District
- Jurisdiction: 16 counties in Florida: Broward, Collier, Glades, Hendry, Lee, Martin, Miami-Dade, Monroe, Palm, and St. Lucie; portions of Charlotte, Highlands, Okeechobee, Orange, Osceola, and Polk
- Parent District: Florida Department of Environmental Protection
- Website: sfwmd.gov

The South Florida Water Management District (SFWMD) is a regional governmental district that oversees water resources from Orlando to the Florida Keys. The mission of the SFWMD is to manage and protect water resources by balancing and improving water quality, flood control, natural systems, and water supply, covering 16 counties in Central and Southern Florida. It is the largest water management district in the state, managing water needs for 7.7 million residents. A key initiative is the restoration of America's Everglades – the largest environmental restoration project in the nation's history. The District is also working to improve the Kissimmee River and its floodplain, Lake Okeechobee and South Florida's coastal estuaries.

The district's governing board consists of Chauncey Goss, Scott Wagner, Ron Bergeron Sr., Carlos E. Martinez, Cheryl Meads, Charlette Roman, Jay Steinle, and Jacqui Thurlow-Lippisch.

== History ==
In 1947, after years of drought, the state was deluged by rainfall averaging 100 inches along the lower east coast, almost twice the norm. Much of the ground was saturated when two hurricanes hit the state late in the year, and flooding throughout the region was devastating. Florida asked the federal government for a master plan to tame nature's excesses. In 1948, the U.S. Congress adopted legislation creating the Central and Southern Florida (C&SF) Project. Construction began the next year and continued over 20 years as the U.S. Army Corps of Engineers built the massive flood control plumbing system stretching from just south of Orlando to Florida Bay.

In 1949, the Florida Legislature created the Central and Southern Florida Flood Control District, the predecessor to the South Florida Water Management District, to manage the C&SF Project. In 1972, with the Florida Water Resources Act (Chapter 373), the state created five water management districts, with expanded responsibilities for regional water resource management and environmental protection. In 1976, voters approved a constitutional amendment giving the districts the authority to levy property taxes to help fund these activities. The boundaries of all five of the state's water management districts are determined by watersheds and other natural, hydrologic, and geographic features. The South Florida Water Management District is the oldest and largest of the state's five water management districts.

A book detailing the first forty years of the South Florida Water Management District titled "Into the Fifth Decade" was written by Thomas E. Huser.

In the year 2000, the Comprehensive Everglades Restoration Plan began to undo some ecosystem damage caused by the C&SF Project.

== Local Sponsor ==
The SFWMD is the designated local sponsor for the Central and Southern Florida Flood Control Project (C&SF Project) Pub. L. 80–858—known as the Flood Control Act of 1948—pursuant to § 373.103(2), Florida Statutes.

== Operations ==
The regional water management system – with nearly 2,000 miles of canals and more than 2,800 miles of levees/berms, 69 pump stations, 645 water control structures, and more than 700 culverts – helps to protect regional water supplies and provide flood control.

Weather extremes dramatically affect South Florida's water supply and flood protection actions. In response, the District actively operates and maintains the water management system promotes water conservation, and works with communities to develop alternative water supplies.

== Programs ==
The South Florida Water Management District manages many programs, including a controversial water farming program, which results in minimal returns for taxpayers and would be much cheaper on state-owned land.

== Public areas ==
Many of the lands protected by the District are open to the public for recreational use.

- Allapattah Flats
- Arthur R. Marshall Loxahatchee National Wildlife Refuge
- Atlantic Ridge Preserve State Park in Martin County
- Blind Creek in St. Lucie County
- Catfish Creek (Florida) in Polk County
- Chandler Slough in Okeechobee County
- Corkscrew Regional Ecosystem Watershed
- Cornwell Marsh
- DuPuis Management Area
- Gordy Road Recreation Area
- Halpatiokee Regional Park in Martin County
- Harold A. Campbell Public Use Area
- Hickory Hammock Wildlife Management Area
- Hungryland Wildlife and Environmental Area
- Intercession City
- KICCO
- Kissimmee Prairie Preserve State Park
- Lake Kissimmee - Bird Island, Drasdo, Gardner-Cobb Marsh, Lightsey, Strum Island
- Lake Marion Creek Wildlife Management Area
- Lake Russell (Florida) in Osceola County
- Lower Reedy Creek
- Loxahatchee River/Cypress Creek Management Area
- Loxahatchee Slough Natural Area
- MICCO Landing
- Miller/Wild Property
- No Name Slough
- North Fork St. Lucie River
- Okaloacoochee Slough Wildlife Management Area
- Pal-Mar East/Nine Gems
- Paradise Run (Florida)
- Queen's Island (Florida) in St. Lucie County
- Reedy Creek (Florida)
- Riverbend Park
- Rough Island North and South
- Shingle Creek Management Area
- Six Mile Cypress Slough Preserve in Lee County
- Southern Glades Wildlife and Environmental Area
- Spruce Bluff in St. Lucie County
- Starvation Slough
- SUMICA in Polk County
- Taylor Creek (Florida)
- Ten Mile Creek (Florida)
- Three Scrub Sites
- Upper Reedy Creek

== See also ==
- Northwest Florida Water Management District
- St. Johns River Water Management District
- Southwest Florida Water Management District
- Suwannee River Water Management District
