= Atlantic Ridge Preserve State Park =

State park in Florida, United States

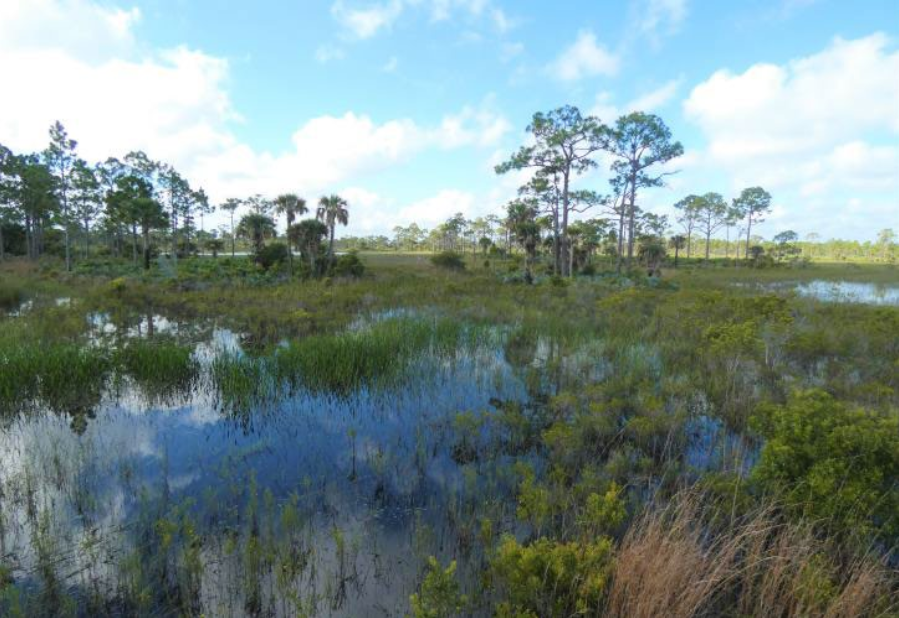
- Atlantic Ridge Preserve

- Location within Florida Location within the United States
- Interactive map of Atlantic Ridge Preserve State Park
- Location: Martin County, Florida, United States
- Nearest city: Stuart
- Coordinates: 27°05′37″N 80°12′47″W
- Area: 1,977 ha (4,886 acres)
- Established: November 4, 1998; 28 years ago
- Visitors: 16,171 (in FY 2023–24)
- Governing body: Florida Department of Environmental Protection

Atlantic Ridge Preserve State Park is a Florida state park in Martin County, located near Stuart between U.S. Route 1 and the South Fork of the St. Lucie River. The 4,886 acres (1,977 ha) preserve is administered as a satellite of Jonathan Dickinson State Park and has limited public access, with a gate code required for entry.

The State of Florida Department of Environmental Protection (DEP) acquired the park on November 4, 1998, under the Conservation and Recreation Lands (CARL) program. Prior to state acquisition, the land was used as a cattle ranch.

The land slopes westward from U.S. 1 toward the river, going from hydric hammock through wet flatwoods to wet prairie. Sabal palm and live oak dominate the canopy over an understory of saw palmetto, wax myrtle, and wild coffee. The preserve is a habitat for eight protected plant species and fifteen protected animal species, among them the Florida sandhill crane, wood stork, and bald eagle. Visitors can participate in activities such as hiking, bicycling, horseback riding, and birding.
