= Water farming =

Water farming is a practice in Florida where farmers are paid to keep stormwater on their properties and receive water from other areas to store on their properties. This practice is also known as Dispersed Water Management by the South Florida Water Management District, and as Water Farcing by critics.

== History ==
In 2005, the South Florida Water Management District created a new program for water farming called the "Dispersed Water Management Program" with eight farmers. The program uses shallow-water storage on existing lands to hold water.

== Lobbying ==
In 2014, Alico dispatched lobbyists to the Florida legislature to try to get funding for the project. When asked about this effort, Alico spokeswoman Sarah Bascom is reported to have said that Alico was just helping a state agency in need by lobbying for the SFWMD who was not permitted by law to lobby. Prior to this effort, funding was provided by the South Florida Water Management District. Though $31.8 million was appropriated for the project in the 2015 legislative session, Gov. Rick Scott vetoed the funding. The largest contract entered into by the South Florida Water Management District -- for 11 years and $122 million -- went to Alico, which would use approximately 35,192 acres of ranchland for water farming. The return on the investment for Florida taxpayers for $122 million invested is about a 1.5-inch reduction in the Lake Okeechobee water level.

== Controversy ==
Much controversy surrounds the use of water farms due to their cost and hard to quantify benefit. A state audit found that the cost of a water farm on public land would be approximately $25 per million gallons, while the cost using privately owned land can be as high as $418 per million gallons. As such, the audit makes clear that the programs costs tens of millions of dollars more than it should.

=== Contract Termination ===
Another concern about the contracts by the South Florida Water Management District with the water farmers is the District is paying for capital improvements to the land owned by the water farmers, but the water farmers can terminate the contract at will. This could make the investment by the District a very poor one if the water farmers decide to plant as solutions to citrus greening emerge.
