= Everglades =

Flooded grassland in Florida, United States

- Wetland
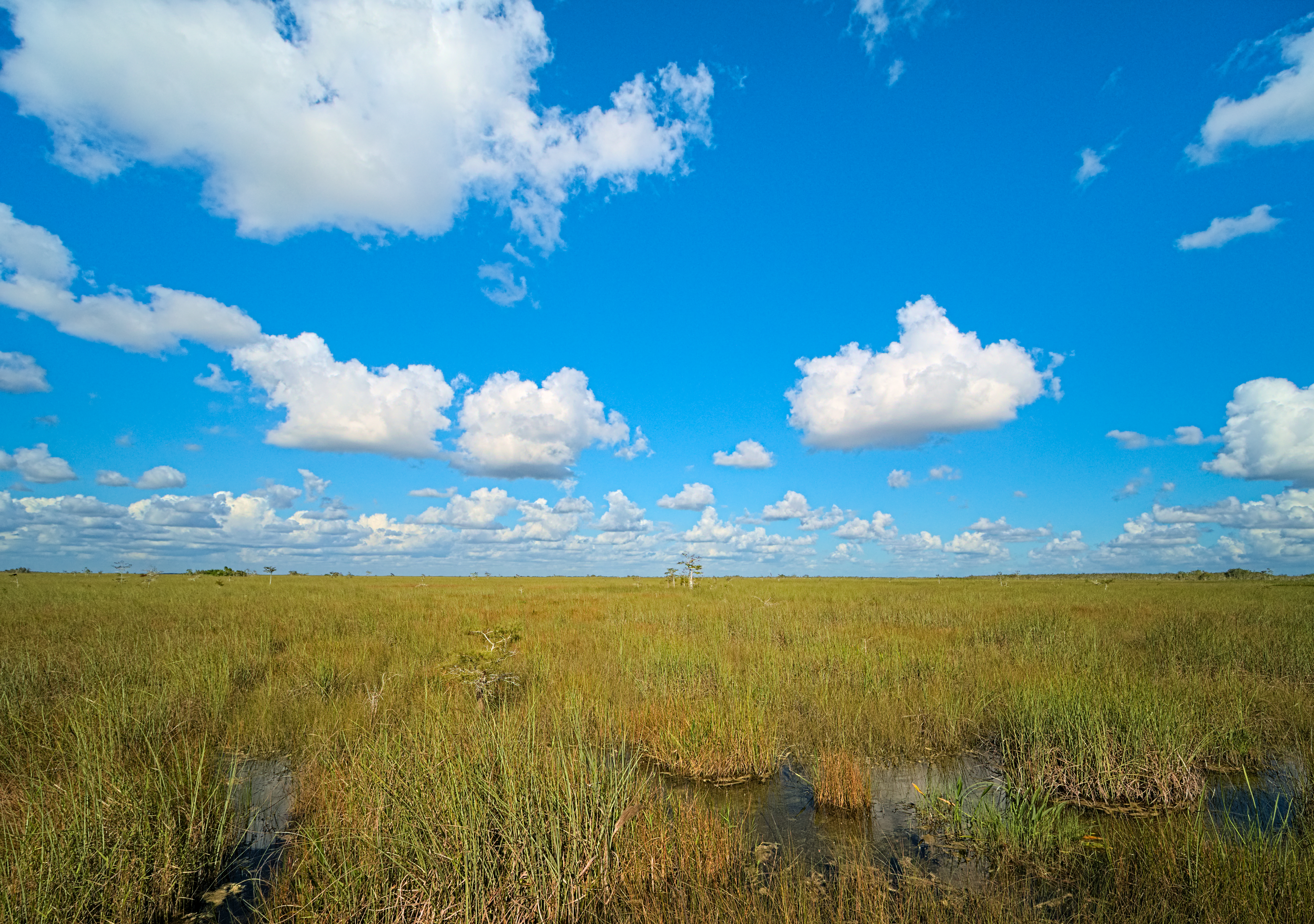
- The most prominent feature of the Everglades are the sawgrass prairies found across the region.

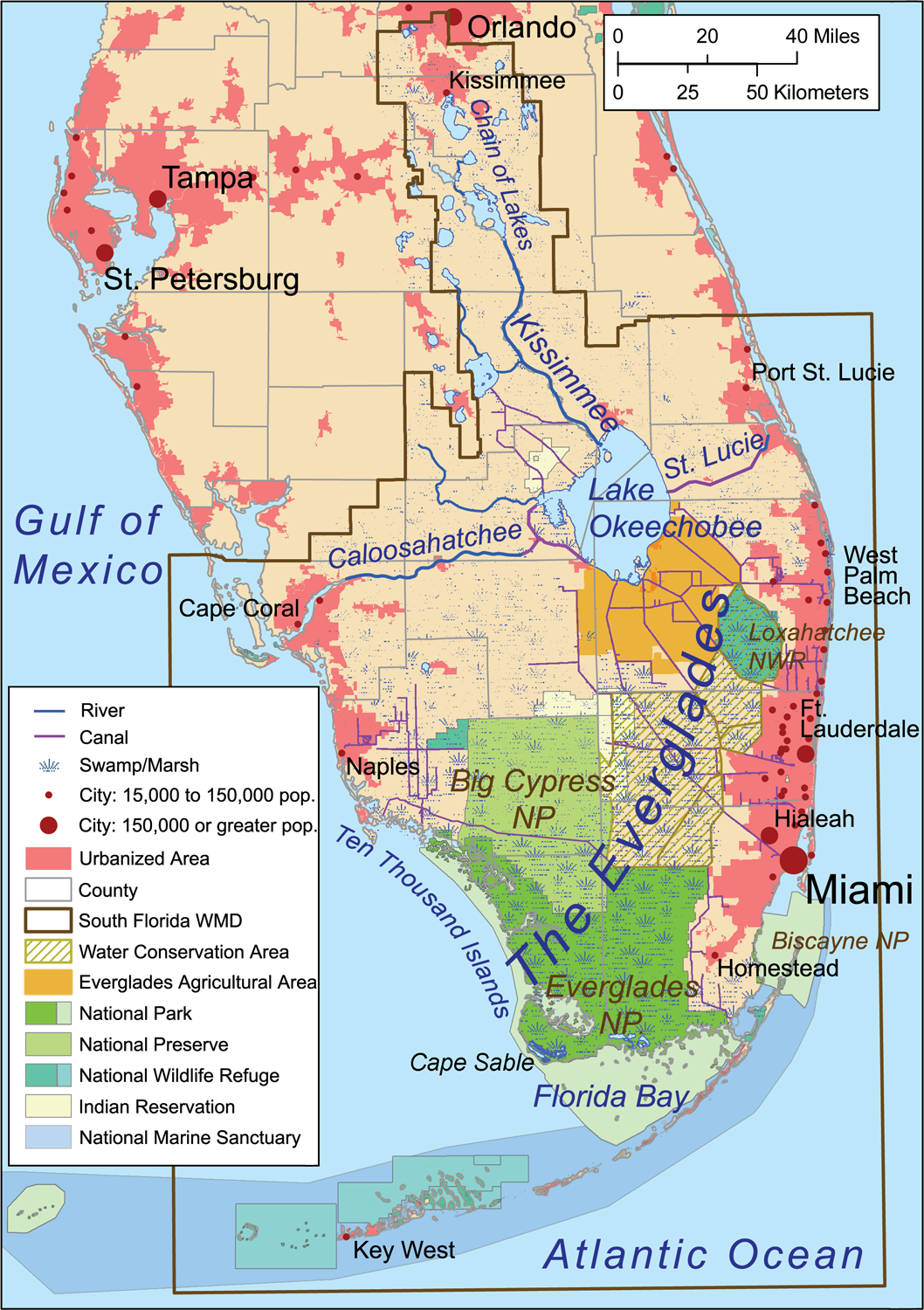
- Location of Everglades in the southern third of the Florida Peninsula
- Coordinates: 26.0°N 80.7°W
- Location: Florida, United States

Area
  - Total: 7,800 square miles (20,000 km^{2})
- Highest elevation: 25 feet (7.6 m)

The Everglades is a natural region of flooded grasslands in the southern portion of the U.S. state of Florida, comprising the southern half of the Kissimmee-Okeechobee-Everglades watershed. The Everglades is in the Neotropical realm. The system begins near Orlando with the Kissimmee River, which discharges into the vast but shallow Lake Okeechobee. Water leaving the lake in the wet season forms a slow-moving river 60 miles (97 km) wide and over 100 miles (160 km) long, flowing southward across a limestone shelf to Florida Bay at the southern end of the state. The Everglades experiences a wide range of weather patterns, from frequent flooding in the wet season to drought in the dry season. Throughout the 20th century, the Everglades suffered significant loss of habitat and environmental degradation.

Human habitation in the southern portion of the Florida peninsula dates to 15,000 years ago. Before European colonization, the region was dominated by the native Calusa and Tequesta tribes. With Spanish colonization, both tribes declined gradually during the following two centuries. The Seminole, formed from mostly Creek people who had been warring to the North, assimilated other peoples and created a new culture after being forced from northern Florida into the Everglades during the Seminole Wars of the early 19th century. After adapting to the region, they were able to resist removal by the United States Army.

Migrants to the region who wanted to develop plantations first proposed draining the Everglades in 1848, but no work of this type was attempted until 1882. Canals were constructed throughout the first half of the 20th century, and spurred the South Florida economy, prompting land development. In 1947, Congress formed the Central and Southern Florida Flood Control Project, which built 1,400 miles (2,300 km) of canals, levees, and water control devices. The Miami metropolitan area grew substantially at this time and Everglades water was diverted to cities. Portions of the Everglades were transformed into farmland, where the primary crop was sugarcane. Approximately 50 percent of the original Everglades has been developed as agricultural or urban areas.

Following this period of rapid development and environmental degradation, the ecosystem began to receive notable attention from conservation groups in the 1970s. Internationally, UNESCO and the Ramsar Convention designated the Everglades a Wetland Area of Global Importance. The construction of a large airport 6 miles (10 km) north of Everglades National Park was blocked when an environmental study found that it would severely damage the South Florida ecosystem. With heightened awareness and appreciation of the region, restoration began in the 1980s with the removal of a canal that had straightened the Kissimmee River. However, development and sustainability concerns have remained pertinent in the region. The deterioration of the Everglades, including poor water quality in Lake Okeechobee, was linked to the diminishing quality of life in South Florida's urban areas. In 2000 the Comprehensive Everglades Restoration Plan was approved by Congress to combat these problems, which at that time was considered the most expensive and comprehensive environmental restoration attempt in history; however, implementation faced political complications.

== Names ==
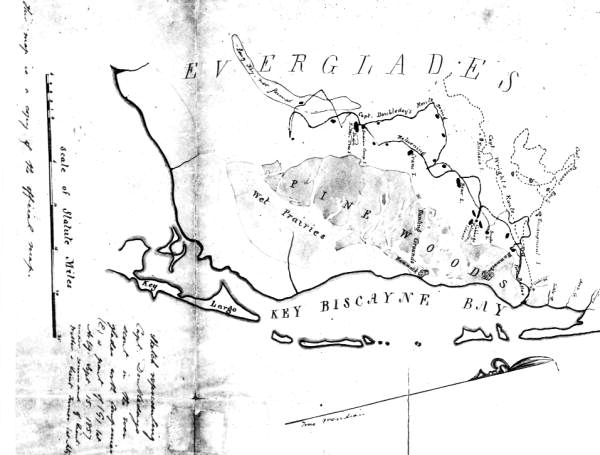
This map made by the U.S. military shows the term "Everglades" was in use by 1857.

The first written record of the Everglades was on Spanish maps made by cartographers who had not seen the land. They named the unknown area between the Gulf and Atlantic coasts of Florida Laguna del Espíritu Santo ("Lake of the Holy Spirit"). The area was featured on maps for decades without having been explored. Writer James Grant Forbes stated in 1811, "The Indians represent [the Southern points] as impenetrable; and the [British] surveyors, wreckers, and coasters, had not the means of exploring beyond the borders of the sea coast, and the mouths of rivers".

British surveyor John Gerard de Brahm, who mapped the coast of Florida in 1773, called the area "River Glades". The name "Everglades" first appeared on a map in 1823, although it was also spelled as "Ever Glades" as late as 1851. The Seminole call it Pahokee, meaning "Grassy Water". The region was labeled "Pa-hai-okee" on a U.S. military map from 1839, although it had earlier been called "Ever Glades" throughout the Second Seminole War.

A 2007 survey by geographers Ary J. Lamme and Raymond K. Oldakowski found that the "Glades" has emerged as a distinct vernacular region of Florida. It comprises the interior areas and southernmost Gulf Coast of South Florida, largely corresponding to the Everglades itself. It is one of the most sparsely populated areas of the state.

== Geology ==
The geology of South Florida, together with a warm, wet, subtropical/tropical climate, provides conditions well-suited for a large marshland ecosystem. Layers of porous and permeable limestone create water-bearing rock and soil that affect the climate, weather, and hydrology of South Florida. The properties of the rock underneath the Everglades can be explained by the geologic history of the state. The crust underneath Florida was at one point part of the African region of the supercontinent Gondwana. About 300 million years ago, North America merged with Africa, connecting Florida with North America. Volcanic activity centered on the eastern side of Florida covered the prevalent sedimentary rock with igneous rock. Continental rifting began to separate North America from Gondwana about 180 million years ago. When Florida was part of Africa, it was initially above water, but during the cooler Jurassic Period, the Florida Platform became a shallow marine environment in which sedimentary rocks were deposited. Through the Cretaceous Period, most of Florida remained a tropical sea floor of varying depths. The peninsula has been covered by seawater at least seven times since the bedrock formed.

=== Limestone and aquifers ===
Fluctuating sea levels compressed numerous layers of calcium carbonate, sand, and shells. The resulting permeable limestone formations that developed between 25 million and 70 million years ago created the Floridan aquifer, which serves as the main source of fresh water for the northern portion of Florida. However, this aquifer lies beneath thousands of feet of impermeable sedimentary rock from Lake Okeechobee to the southern tip of the peninsula.

A satellite image of the Everglades, taken in March 2019

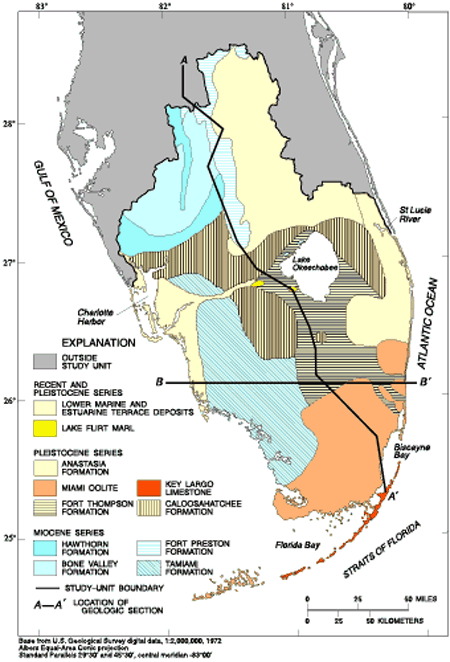
Limestone formations in South Florida. Source: U.S. Geological Survey

Five geologic formations form the surface of the southern portion of Florida: the Tamiami Formation, Caloosahatchee Formation, Anastasia Formation, Miami Limestone, and the Fort Thompson Formation. The Tamiami Formation is a compression of highly permeable light-colored fossiliferous sands and pockets of quartz, 150 feet (46 m) thick. It is named for the Tamiami Trail that follows the upper bedrock of the Big Cypress Swamp, and underlies the southern portion of the Everglades. Between the Tamiami Formation and Lake Okeechobee is the Caloosahatchee Formation, named for the river over it. Much less permeable, this formation is highly calcitic and is composed of sandy shell marl, clay, and sand. Water underneath the Caloosahatchee Formation is typically very mineralized. Both the Tamiami and Caloosahatchee Formations developed during the Pliocene Epoch.

Surrounding the southern part of Lake Okeechobee is the Fort Thompson Formation, made of dense, hard limestone, shells, and sand. Rain water is less likely to erode the limestone to form solution holes—smaller versions of sinkholes that do not intersect with the water table. In this formation the beds are generally impermeable. Underneath the metropolitan areas of Palm Beach County is the Anastasia Formation, composed of shelly limestone, coquina, and sand representing a former mangrove or salt marsh. The Anastasia Formation is much more permeable and filled with pocks and solution holes. The Fort Thompson and Anastasia Formations, and Miami Limestone and (x), were formed during the Sangamonian interglacial period.

The geologic formations that have the most influence on the Everglades are the Miami Limestone and the Fort Thompson Formation. The Miami Limestone has two facies. The Miami Oolite facies, which underlies the Atlantic Coastal Ridge from southern Palm Beach County to southern Miami-Dade County, is made up of ooids: tiny formations of egg-shaped concentric shells and calcium carbonate, formed around a single grain of sand or shell fragment. The other facies, which underlies the eastern lower Everglades (in Miami-Dade County and part of Monroe County) consists of fossilized bryozoan organisms. The unique structure was some of the first material used in housing in early 20th-century South Florida. The composition of this sedimentary formation affects the hydrology, plant life, and wildlife above it: the rock is especially porous and stores water during the dry season in the Everglades, and its chemical composition determines the vegetation prevalent in the region. The Miami Oolite facies also acts to impede flow of water from the Everglades to the ocean between Fort Lauderdale and Coot Bay (near Cape Sable).

The metropolitan areas of Miami, Fort Lauderdale, and West Palm Beach are located on a rise in elevation along the eastern coast of Florida, called the Miami Rock Ridge, a relict oolite shoal deposited on top of the Anastasia Formation. Along the western border of the Big Cypress Swamp is the Immokolee Ridge (or Immokolee Rise), a slight rise of compressed sand that divides the runoff between the Caloosahatchee River and The Big Cypress. This slight rise in elevation on both sides of the Everglades creates a basin, and forces water that overflows Lake Okeechobee to creep toward the southwest. Under both the Miami Limestone formation and the Fort Thompson limestone lies the Biscayne Aquifer, a surface aquifer that serves as the Miami metropolitan area's fresh water source. Rainfall and stored water in the Everglades replenish the Biscayne Aquifer directly.

With the rise of sea levels that occurred during the Pleistocene approximately 17,000 years ago, the runoff of water from Lake Okeechobee slowed and created the vast marshland that is now known as the Everglades. Slower runoff also created an accumulation of almost 18 feet (5.5 m) of peat in the area. The presence of such peat deposits, dated to about 5,000 years ago, is evidence that widespread flooding had occurred by then.

=== Hydrology ===
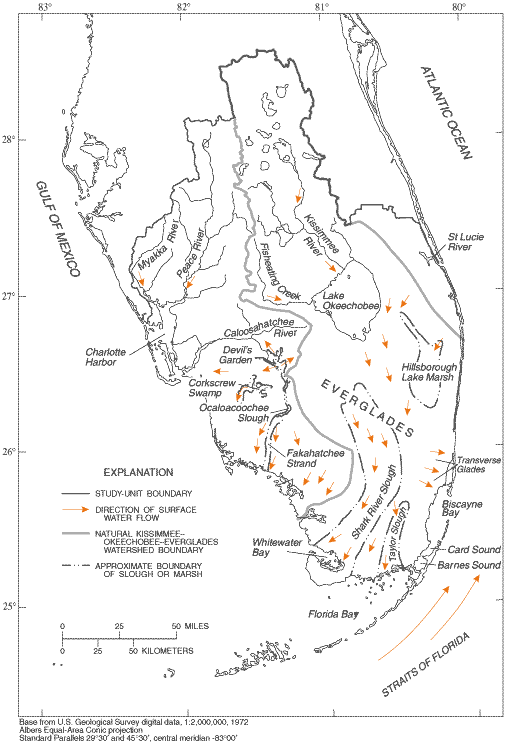
Predevelopment flow direction of water from Lake Okeechobee to Florida Bay Source: U.S. Geological Survey

The consistent Everglades flooding is fed by the extensive Kissimmee, Caloosahatchee, Miami, Myakka, and Peace Rivers in central Florida. The Kissimmee River is a broad floodplain that empties directly into Lake Okeechobee, which at 730 square miles (1,900 km^{2}) with an average depth of 9 feet (2.7 m), is a vast but shallow lake. Soil deposits in the Everglades basin indicate that peat is deposited where the land is flooded consistently throughout the year. Calcium deposits are left behind when flooding is shorter. The deposits occur in areas where water rises and falls depending on rainfall, as opposed to water being stored in the rock from one year to the next. Calcium deposits are present where more limestone is exposed.

The area from Orlando to the tip of the Florida peninsula was at one point a single drainage unit. When rainfall exceeded the capacity of Lake Okeechobee and the Kissimmee River floodplain, it spilled over and flowed in a southwestern direction to empty into Florida Bay. Prior to urban and agricultural development in Florida, the Everglades began at the southern edge of Lake Okeechobee and flowed for approximately 100 miles (160 km), emptying into the Gulf of Mexico. The limestone shelf is wide and slightly angled instead of having a narrow, deep channel characteristic of most rivers. The vertical gradient from Lake Okeechobee to Florida Bay is about 2 inches (5.1 cm) per mile, creating an almost 60-mile (97 km) wide expanse of river that travels about one-half mile (0.80 km) a day. This slow movement of a broad, shallow river is known as sheetflow, and gives the Everglades its nickname, River of Grass. Water leaving Lake Okeechobee may require months or years to reach its final destination, Florida Bay. The sheetflow travels so slowly that water is typically stored from one wet season to the next in the porous limestone substrate. The ebb and flow of water has shaped the land and every ecosystem in South Florida throughout the Everglades' estimated 5,000 years of existence. The motion of water defines plant communities and how animals adapt to their habitats and food sources.

== Climate ==
Hurricane Charley in 2004 moving ashore on South Florida's Gulf of Mexico coast

The climate of South Florida is located across the broad transition zone between subtropical and tropical climates (Koppen Aw, Am and Cfa). Like most regions with this climate type, there are two basic seasons – a "dry season" (winter) which runs from November through April, and a "wet season" (summer) which runs from May through October. About 70% of the annual rainfall in south Florida occurs in the wet season – often as brief but intense tropical downpours. The dry season sees little rainfall and dew points and humidity are often quite low. The dry season can be severe at times, as wildfires and water restrictions are often in place.

The annual range of temperatures in south Florida and the Everglades is rather small—‌less than 20 °F or 11 °C—‌ranging from a monthly mean temperature of around 65 °F (18 °C) in January to 83 °F (28 °C) in July. High temperatures in the hot and wet season (summer) typically exceed 90 °F (32 °C) across inland south Florida (although coastal locations are cooled by winds from the Gulf of Mexico and the Atlantic Ocean), while high temperatures in the dry winter season average from 70 to 79 °F (21 to 26 °C). Frost and freeze are rare across south Florida and the Everglades; annually coastal cities like Miami and Naples report zero days with frost, although a few times each decade low temperatures may fall between 30 and 40 °F (−1 and 4 °C) across South Florida. The plant hardiness zones are 10a north with an average annual extreme minimum air temperature of 30 to 35 °F (−1 to +2 °C), and 10b south with an average annual extreme minimum air temperature of 35 to 40 °F (2 to 4 °C). Annual rainfall averages approximately 62 inches (160 cm), with the Eastern Coastal Ridge receiving the majority of precipitation and the area surrounding Lake Okeechobee receiving about 48 inches (120 cm).

Unlike any other wetland system on earth, the Everglades are sustained primarily by the atmosphere. Evapotranspiration—‌the sum of evaporation and plant transpiration from the Earth's land surface to atmosphere—‌associated with thunderstorms, is the key mechanism by which water leaves the region. During a year unaffected by drought, the rate may reach 40 inches (100 cm) a year. When droughts take place, the rate may peak at over 50 inches (130 cm), and exceed the amount of rainfall. As water leaves an area through evaporation from groundwater or from plant matter, activated primarily by solar energy, it is then moved by wind patterns to other areas that border or flow into the Everglades watershed system. Evapotranspiration is responsible for approximately 70–90% of water entering undeveloped wetland regions in the Everglades.

Precipitation during the wet season is primarily caused by air mass thunderstorms and the easterly flow out of the subtropical high (Bermuda High). Intense daytime heating of the ground causes the warm moist tropical air to rise, creating the afternoon thundershowers typical of tropical climates. Across South Florida and the Everglades, 2:00 pm is the mean time of daily thundershower occurrence. Late in the wet season (August and September), precipitation levels reach their highest levels as tropical depressions and lows add to daily rainfall. Occasionally, tropical lows can become severe tropical cyclones and cause significant damage when they make landfall across south Florida. Tropical storms average one a year, and major hurricanes about once every ten years. Between 1871 and 1981, 138 tropical cyclones struck directly over or close to the Everglades. Strong winds from these storms disperse plant seeds and replenish mangrove forests, coral reefs, and other ecosystems. Dramatic fluctuations in precipitation are characteristic of the South Florida climate. Droughts, floods, and tropical cyclones are part of the natural water system in the Everglades.

Climate data for 36 mi WNW Miami, Miami-Dade County, Florida (1981 – 2010 averages).
Month	Jan	Feb	Mar	Apr	May	Jun	Jul	Aug	Sep	Oct	Nov	Dec	Year
Mean daily maximum °F (°C)	76.7 (24.8)	78.9 (26.1)	81.1 (27.3)	84.9 (29.4)	88.6 (31.4)	90.8 (32.7)	91.9 (33.3)	92.0 (33.3)	90.4 (32.4)	87.1 (30.6)	82.1 (27.8)	78.4 (25.8)	85.3 (29.6)
Daily mean °F (°C)	66.5 (19.2)	68.6 (20.3)	70.8 (21.6)	74.0 (23.3)	78.2 (25.7)	82.0 (27.8)	83.5 (28.6)	83.9 (28.8)	82.8 (28.2)	79.5 (26.4)	73.8 (23.2)	69.0 (20.6)	76.1 (24.5)
Mean daily minimum °F (°C)	56.2 (13.4)	58.3 (14.6)	60.5 (15.8)	63.1 (17.3)	67.7 (19.8)	73.1 (22.8)	75.1 (23.9)	75.8 (24.3)	75.3 (24.1)	71.8 (22.1)	65.4 (18.6)	59.5 (15.3)	66.9 (19.4)
Average precipitation inches (mm)	1.62 (41)	2.03 (52)	2.75 (70)	2.56 (65)	4.45 (113)	8.70 (221)	7.11 (181)	7.42 (188)	7.01 (178)	4.02 (102)	2.08 (53)	1.38 (35)	51.13 (1,299)
Average relative humidity (%)	74.6	73.0	70.7	68.3	70.7	75.3	74.7	76.2	77.6	76.6	75.6	75.4	74.1
Source: PRISM Climate Group

Month	Jan	Feb	Mar	Apr	May	Jun	Jul	Aug	Sep	Oct	Nov	Dec	Year
Average Dew Point °F	58.2	59.6	60.8	62.9	67.9	73.4	74.6	75.6	75.1	71.5	65.6	60.9	67.2
Average Dew Point °C	14.6	15.3	16.0	17.2	19.9	23.0	23.7	24.2	23.9	21.9	18.7	16.1	19.6
Source = PRISM Climate Group

Climate data for Royal Palm Ranger Station, Florida, 1991–2020 normals, extremes 1949–present
Month	Jan	Feb	Mar	Apr	May	Jun	Jul	Aug	Sep	Oct	Nov	Dec	Year
Record high °F (°C)	92 (33)	97 (36)	101 (38)	102 (39)	107 (42)	104 (40)	102 (39)	103 (39)	105 (41)	106 (41)	99 (37)	95 (35)	107 (42)
Mean maximum °F (°C)	86.8 (30.4)	88.4 (31.3)	91.2 (32.9)	93.3 (34.1)	95.9 (35.5)	97.1 (36.2)	97.3 (36.3)	97.3 (36.3)	96.8 (36.0)	94.7 (34.8)	90.1 (32.3)	87.5 (30.8)	99.4 (37.4)
Mean daily maximum °F (°C)	78.0 (25.6)	80.9 (27.2)	83.3 (28.5)	86.4 (30.2)	89.4 (31.9)	91.1 (32.8)	92.5 (33.6)	92.6 (33.7)	91.3 (32.9)	88.0 (31.1)	83.2 (28.4)	80.0 (26.7)	86.4 (30.2)
Daily mean °F (°C)	66.6 (19.2)	68.7 (20.4)	70.7 (21.5)	74.2 (23.4)	78.0 (25.6)	81.6 (27.6)	83.0 (28.3)	83.5 (28.6)	82.8 (28.2)	79.4 (26.3)	73.5 (23.1)	69.3 (20.7)	75.9 (24.4)
Mean daily minimum °F (°C)	55.1 (12.8)	56.5 (13.6)	58.0 (14.4)	62.0 (16.7)	66.6 (19.2)	72.0 (22.2)	73.5 (23.1)	74.3 (23.5)	74.2 (23.4)	70.9 (21.6)	63.8 (17.7)	58.6 (14.8)	65.5 (18.6)
Mean minimum °F (°C)	38.9 (3.8)	41.7 (5.4)	43.7 (6.5)	50.3 (10.2)	58.0 (14.4)	67.8 (19.9)	70.3 (21.3)	71.0 (21.7)	70.8 (21.6)	61.3 (16.3)	52.1 (11.2)	44.5 (6.9)	35.8 (2.1)
Record low °F (°C)	24 (−4)	29 (−2)	31 (−1)	37 (3)	49 (9)	50 (10)	66 (19)	66 (19)	64 (18)	49 (9)	31 (−1)	27 (−3)	24 (−4)
Average precipitation inches (mm)	1.70 (43)	1.82 (46)	1.93 (49)	2.85 (72)	5.84 (148)	9.00 (229)	6.82 (173)	8.57 (218)	9.01 (229)	5.55 (141)	2.39 (61)	1.88 (48)	57.36 (1,457)
Average precipitation days (≥ 0.01 in)	6.6	6.5	6.7	6.3	10.9	17.2	17.2	19.2	18.3	12.6	7.8	6.6	135.9
Source: NOAA

== Formative and sustaining processes ==
The Everglades are a complex system of interdependent ecosystems. Marjory Stoneman Douglas described the area as a "River of Grass" in 1947, though that metaphor represents only a portion of the system. The area recognized as the Everglades, prior to drainage, was a web of marshes and prairies 4,000 square miles (10,000 km^{2}) in size. Borders between ecosystems are subtle or imperceptible. These systems shift, grow and shrink, die, or reappear within years or decades. Geologic factors, climate, and the frequency of fire help to create, maintain, or replace the ecosystems in the Everglades.

=== Water ===
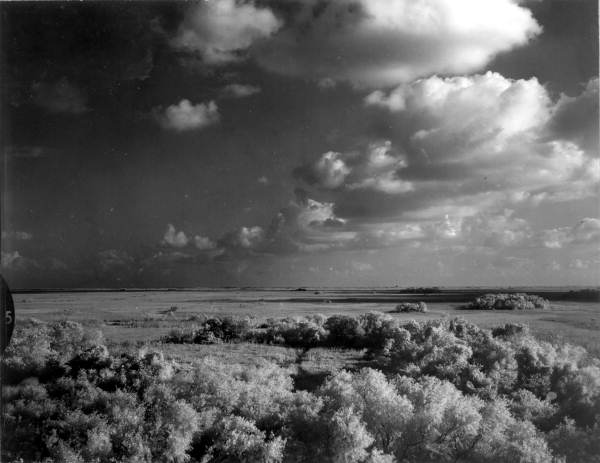
A storm over the Shark River in the Everglades, 1966

Water is the dominant force in the Everglades, shaping the land, vegetation, and animal life in South Florida. Starting at the last glacial maximum, 21,000 years ago, continental ice sheets retreated and sea levels rose. This submerged portions of the Florida peninsula and caused the water table to rise. Fresh water saturated the limestone that underlies the Everglades, eroding some of it away, and created springs and sinkholes. The abundance of fresh water allowed new vegetation to take root, and formed convective thunderstorms over the land through evaporation.

As rain continued to fall, the slightly acidic rainwater dissolved the limestone. As limestone wore away, the groundwater came into contact with the land surface and created a massive wetland ecosystem. Although the region appears flat, weathering of the limestone created slight valleys and plateaus in some areas. These plateaus rise and fall only a few inches, but on the subtle South Florida topography these small variations affect both the flow of water and the types of vegetation that can take hold.

=== Rock ===
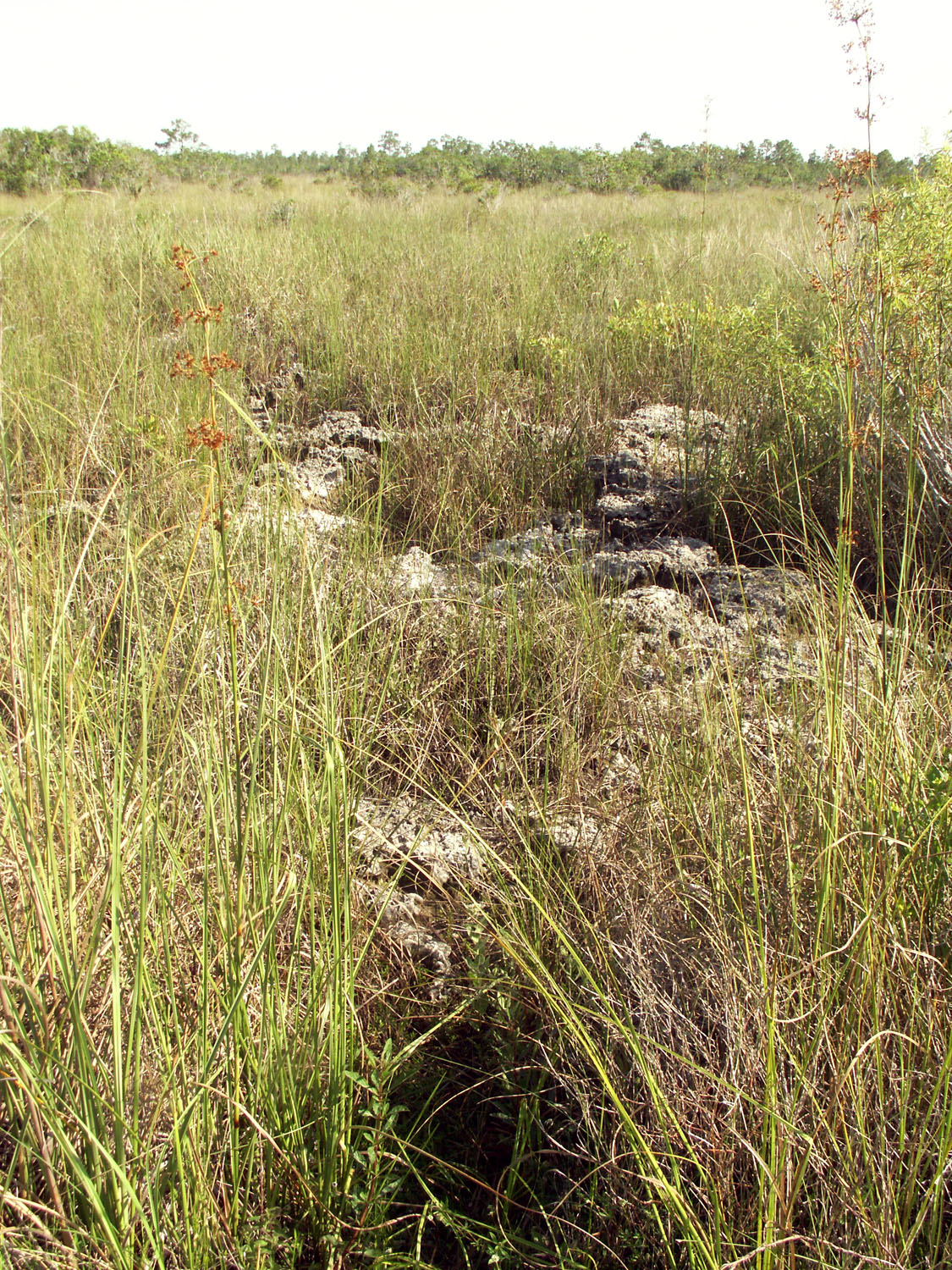
Uneven limestone formations in an Everglades sawgrass prairie

The underlying bedrock or limestone of the Everglades basin affects the hydroperiod, or how long an area within the region stays flooded throughout the year. Longer hydroperiods are possible in areas that were submerged beneath seawater for longer periods of time, while the geology of Florida was forming. More water is held within the porous ooids and limestone than older types of rock that spent more time above sea level. A hydroperiod of ten months or more fosters the growth of sawgrass, whereas a shorter hydroperiod of six months or less promotes beds of periphyton, a growth of algae and other microscopic organisms. There are only two types of soil in the Everglades, peat and marl. Where there are longer hydroperiods, peat builds up over hundreds or thousands of years due to many generations of decaying plant matter. Where periphyton grows, the soil develops into marl, which is more calcitic in composition.

Initial attempts at developing agriculture near Lake Okeechobee were successful, but the nutrients in the peat were rapidly removed. In a process called soil subsidence, oxidation of peat causes loss of volume. Bacteria decompose dead sawgrass slowly underwater without oxygen. When the water was drained in the 1920s and bacteria interacted with oxygen, an aerobic reaction occurred. Microorganisms degraded the peat into carbon dioxide and water. Some of the peat was burned by settlers to clear the land. Some homes built in the areas of early farms had to have their foundations moved to stilts as the peat deteriorated; other areas lost approximately 8 feet (2.4 m) of soil depth.

=== Fire ===
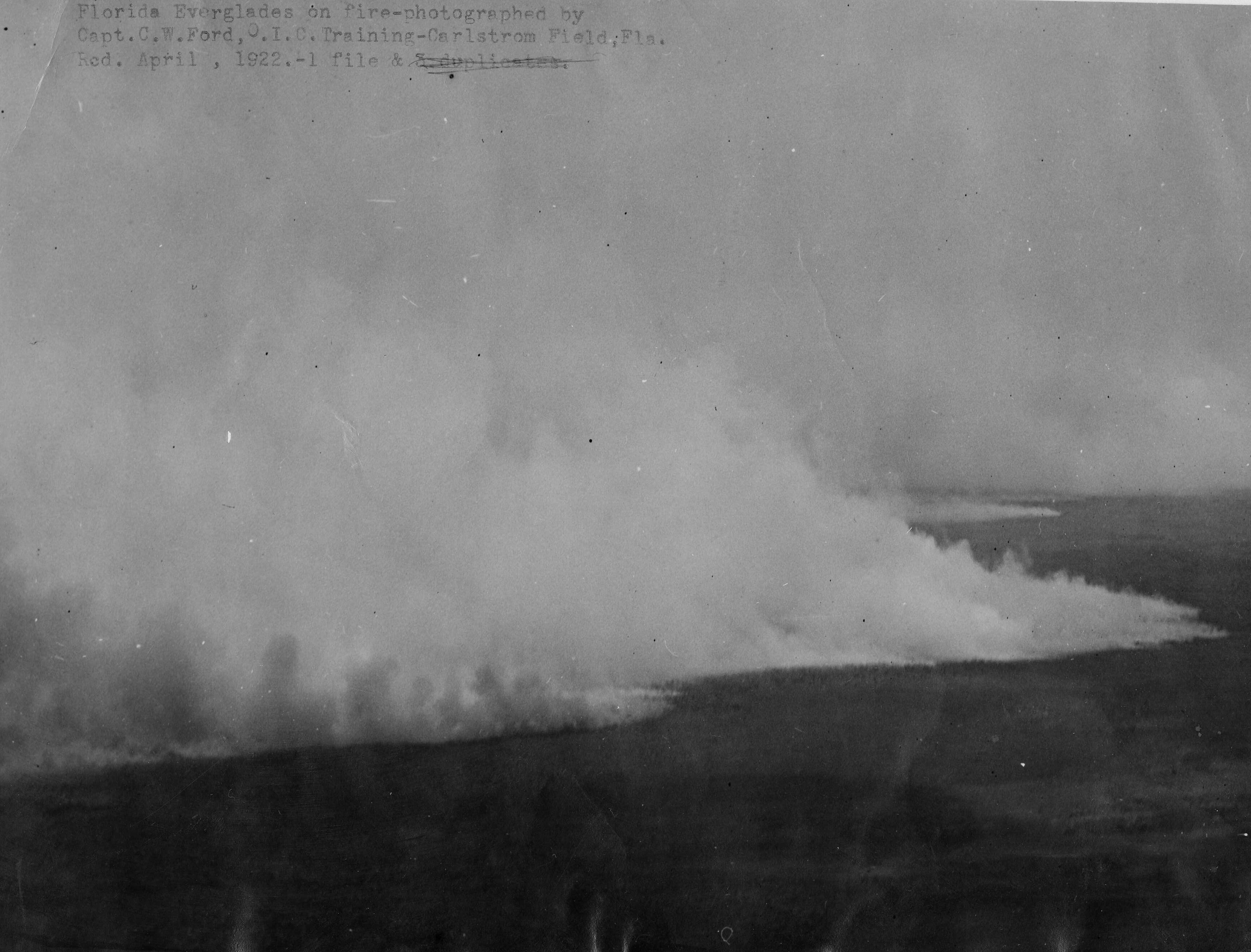
Wildfire photographed in 1922

Fire is an important element in the natural maintenance of the Everglades. The majority of fires are caused by lightning strikes from thunderstorms during the wet season. Their effects are largely superficial, and serve to foster specific plant growth: sawgrass will burn above water, but the roots are preserved underneath. Fire in the sawgrass marshes serves to keep out larger bushes and trees, and releases nutrients from decaying plant matter more efficiently than decomposition. Whereas in the wet season, dead plant matter and the tips of grasses and trees are burned, in the dry season the fire may be fed by organic peat and burn deeply, destroying root systems. Fires are confined by existing water and rainfall. It takes approximately 225 years for one foot (0.30 m) of peat to develop, but in some locations the peat is less dense than it should be for the 5,000 years of the Everglades' existence. Scientists indicate fire as the cause; it is also cited as the reason for the black color of Everglades muck. Layers of charcoal have been detected in the peat in portions of the Everglades that indicate the region endured severe fires for years at a time, although this trend seems to have abated since the last occurrence in 940 BC.

== Ecosystems ==
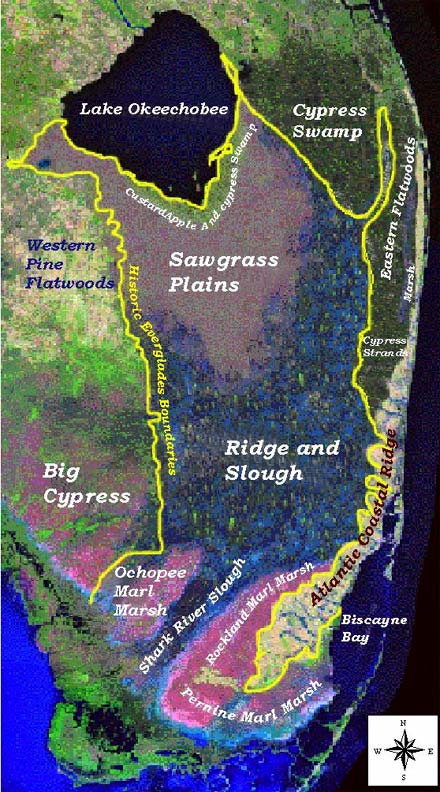
Major landscape types in the Everglades before human action. Source: U.S. Geological Survey

=== Sawgrass marshes and sloughs ===
Several ecosystems are present in the Everglades, and boundaries between them are subtle or absent. The primary feature of the Everglades is the sawgrass marsh. The iconic water and sawgrass combination in the shallow river 100 miles (160 km) long and 60 miles (97 km) wide that spans from Lake Okeechobee to Florida Bay is often referred to as the "true Everglades" or just "the Glades". Prior to the first drainage attempts in 1905, the sheetflow occupied nearly a third of the lower Florida peninsula. Sawgrass thrives in the slowly moving water, but may die in unusually deep floods if oxygen is unable to reach its roots. It is particularly vulnerable immediately after a fire. The hydroperiod for the marsh is at least nine months, and can last longer. Where sawgrass grows densely, few animals or other plants live, although alligators choose these locations for nesting. Where there is more room, periphyton grows. Periphyton supports larval insects and amphibians, which in turn are consumed as food by birds, fish, and reptiles. It also absorbs calcium from water, which adds to the calcitic composition of the marl.

Sloughs, or free-flowing channels of water, develop in between sawgrass prairies. Sloughs are about 3 feet (0.91 m) deeper than sawgrass marshes, and may stay flooded for at least 11 months out of the year and sometimes multiple years in a row. Aquatic animals such as turtles, alligators, snakes, and fish thrive in sloughs; they usually feed on aquatic invertebrates. Submerged and floating plants grow here, such as bladderwort (Utricularia), waterlily (Nymphaeaceae), and spatterdock (Nuphar lutea). Major sloughs in the Everglades system include the Shark River Slough flowing out to Florida Bay, Lostmans River Slough bordering The Big Cypress, and Taylor Slough in the eastern Everglades.

Wet prairies are slightly elevated like sawgrass marshes, but with greater plant diversity. The surface is covered in water only three to seven months of the year, and the water is, on average, shallow at only 4 inches (10 cm) deep. When flooded, the marl can support a variety of water plants. Solution holes, or deep pits where the limestone has worn away, may remain flooded even when the prairies are dry, and they support aquatic invertebrates such as crayfish and snails, and larval amphibians which feed young wading birds. These regions tend to border between sloughs and sawgrass marshes.

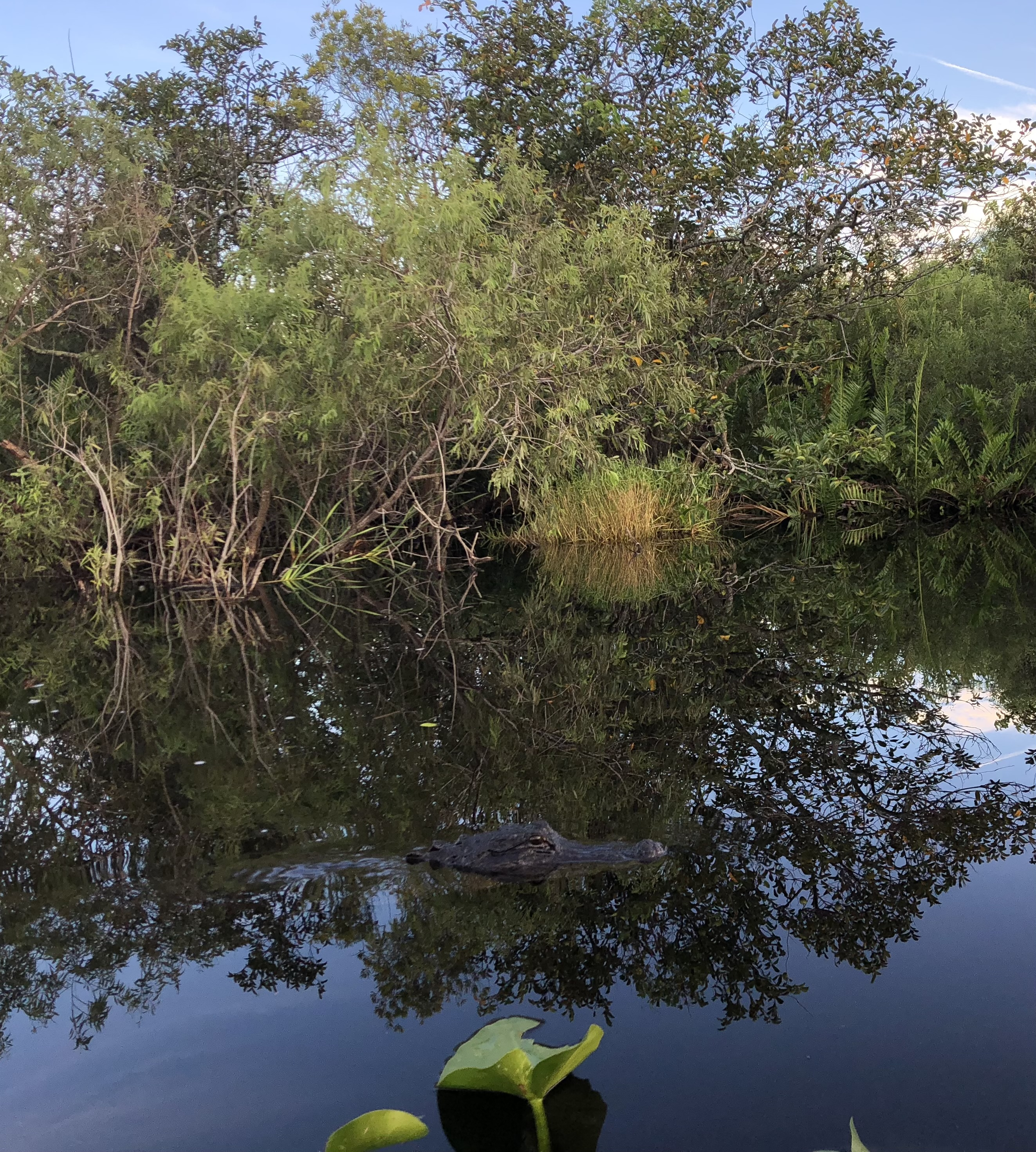
Alligator in the Everglades

Alligators have created a niche in wet prairies. With their claws and snouts they dig at low spots and create ponds free of vegetation that remain submerged throughout the dry season. Alligator holes are integral to the survival of aquatic invertebrates, turtles, fish, small mammals, and birds during extended drought periods. The alligators then feed upon some of the animals that come to the hole.

=== Tropical hardwood hammock ===
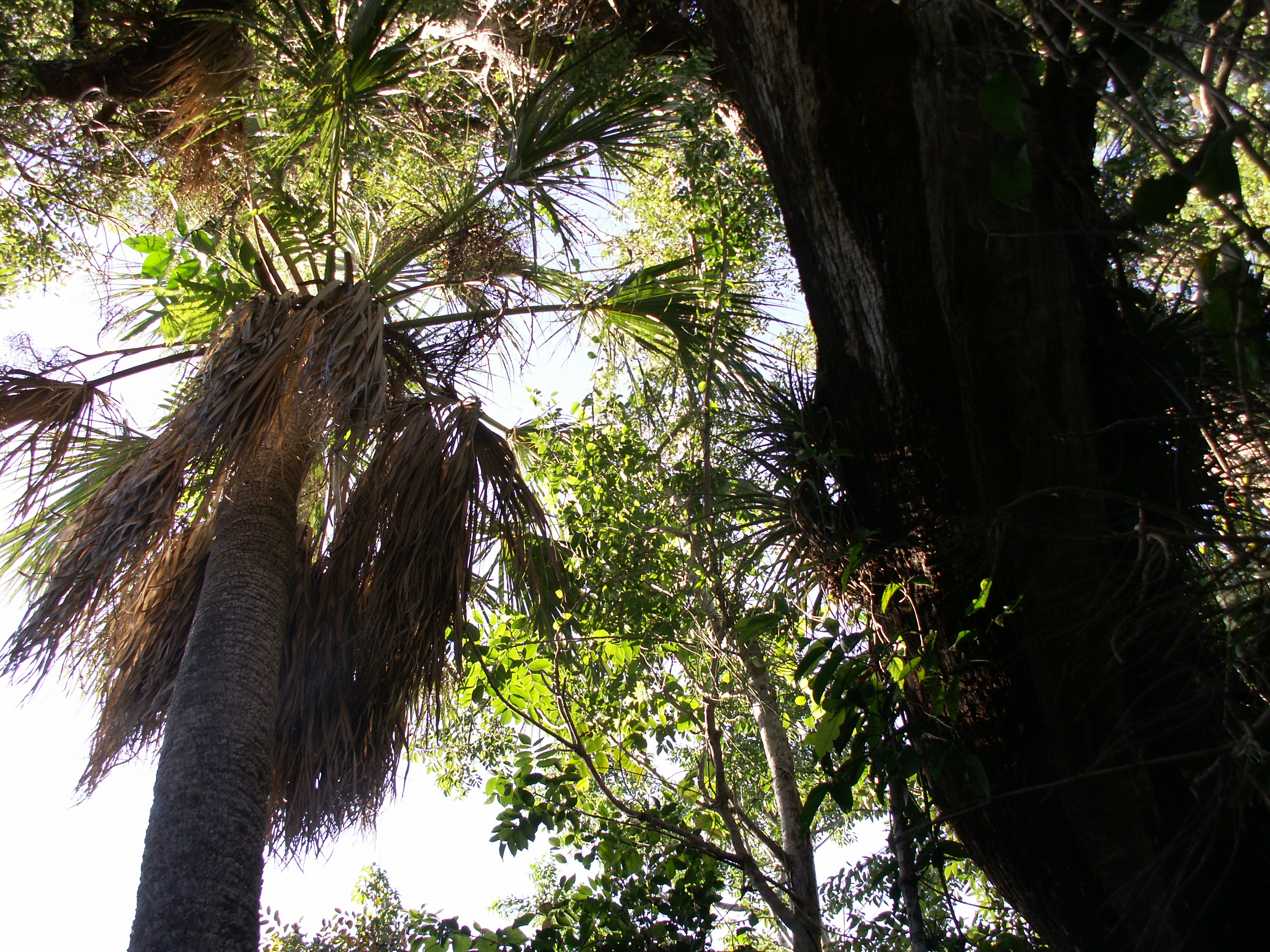
In a tropical hardwood hammock, trees are very dense and diverse.

Small islands of trees growing on land raised between 1 and 3 feet (0.30 and 0.91 m) above sloughs and prairies are called tropical hardwood hammocks. They may range from one (4,000 m^{2}) to ten acres (40,000 m^{2}) in area, and appear in freshwater sloughs, sawgrass prairies, or pineland. Hammocks are slightly elevated on limestone plateaus risen several inches above the surrounding peat, or they may grow on land that has been unharmed by deep peat fires. Hardwood hammocks exhibit a mixture of subtropical and hardwood trees, such as southern live oak (Quercus virginiana), gumbo limbo (Bursera simaruba), royal palm (Roystonea), and bustic (Dipholis salicifolia) that grow in very dense clumps. Near the base, sharp saw palmettos (Serenoa repens) flourish, making the hammocks very difficult for people to penetrate, though small mammals, reptiles and amphibians find these islands an ideal habitat. Water in sloughs flows around the islands, creating moats. Although some ecosystems are maintained and promoted by fire, hammocks may take decades or centuries to recover. The moats around the hammocks protect the trees. The trees are limited in height by weather factors such as frost, lightning, and wind; the majority of trees in hammocks grow no higher than 55 feet (17 m).

=== Pineland ===
Some of the driest land in the Everglades is pineland (also called pine rockland) ecosystem, located in the highest part of the Everglades with little to no hydroperiod. Some floors, however, may have flooded solution holes or puddles for a few months at a time. The most significant feature of the pineland is the single species of South Florida slash pine (Pinus elliottii). Pineland communities require fire to maintain them, and the trees have several adaptations that simultaneously promote and resist fire. The sandy floor of the pine forest is covered with dry pine needles that are highly flammable. South Florida slash pines are insulated by their bark to protect them from heat. Fire eliminates competing vegetation on the forest floor, and opens pine cones to germinate seeds. A period without significant fire can turn pineland into a hardwood hammock as larger trees overtake the slash pines. The understory shrubs in pine rocklands are the fire-resistant saw palmetto (Serenoa repens), cabbage palm (Sabal palmetto), and West Indian lilac (Tetrazygia bicolor). The most diverse group of plants in the pine community are the herbs, of which there are two dozen species. These plants contain tubers and other mechanisms that allow them to sprout quickly after being charred.

Prior to urban development of the South Florida region, pine rocklands covered approximately 161,660 acres (654.2 km^{2}) in Miami-Dade County. Within Everglades National Park, 19,840 acres (80.3 km^{2}) of pine forests are protected, but outside the park, 1,780 acres (7.2 km^{2}) of pine communities remained as of 1990, averaging 12.1 acres (49,000 m^{2}) in area. The misunderstanding of the role of fire also played a part in the disappearance of pine forests in the area, as natural fires were put out and pine rocklands transitioned into hardwood hammocks. Prescribed fires occur in Everglades National Park in pine rocklands every three to seven years.

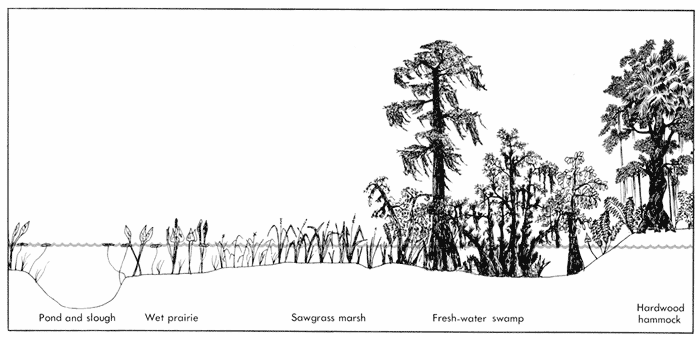
A cross section of fresh water ecosystems in the Everglades, with relative average water depths

=== Cypress ===
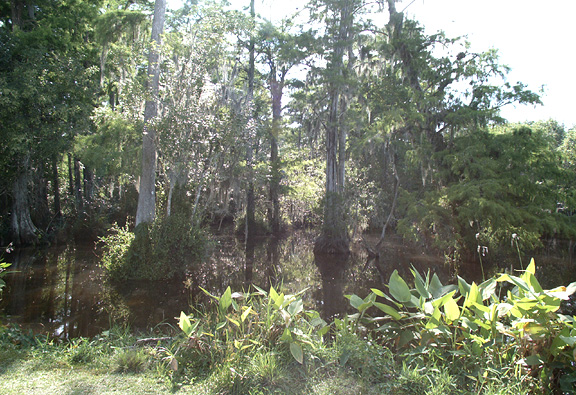
A pond in The Big Cypress

Cypress swamps can be found throughout the Everglades, but the largest covers most of Collier County. The Big Cypress Swamp is located to the west of the sawgrass prairies and sloughs, and it is commonly called "The Big Cypress". The name refers to its area rather than the height or diameter of the trees; at its most conservative estimate, the swamp measures 1,200 square miles (3,100 km^{2}), but the hydrologic boundary of The Big Cypress can be calculated at over 2,400 square miles (6,200 km^{2}). Most of The Big Cypress sits atop a bedrock covered by a thinner layer of limestone. The limestone underneath the Big Cypress contains quartz, which creates sandy soil that hosts a variety of vegetation different from what is found in other areas of the Everglades. The basin for The Big Cypress receives on average 55 inches (140 cm) of water in the wet season.

Although The Big Cypress is the largest growth of cypress swamps in South Florida, cypress swamps can be found near the Atlantic Coastal Ridge and between Lake Okeechobee and the Eastern flatwoods, as well as in sawgrass marshes. Cypresses are deciduous conifers that are uniquely adapted to thrive in flooded conditions, with buttressed trunks and root projections that protrude out of the water, called "knees". bald cypress trees grow in formations with the tallest and thickest trunks in the center, rooted in the deepest peat. As the peat thins out, cypresses grow smaller and thinner, giving the small forest the appearance of a dome from the outside. They also grow in strands, slightly elevated on a ridge of limestone bordered on either side by sloughs. Other hardwood trees can be found in cypress domes, such as red maple, swamp bay, and pop ash. If cypresses are removed, the hardwoods take over, and the ecosystem is recategorized as a mixed swamp forest.

=== Mangrove and Coastal prairie ===
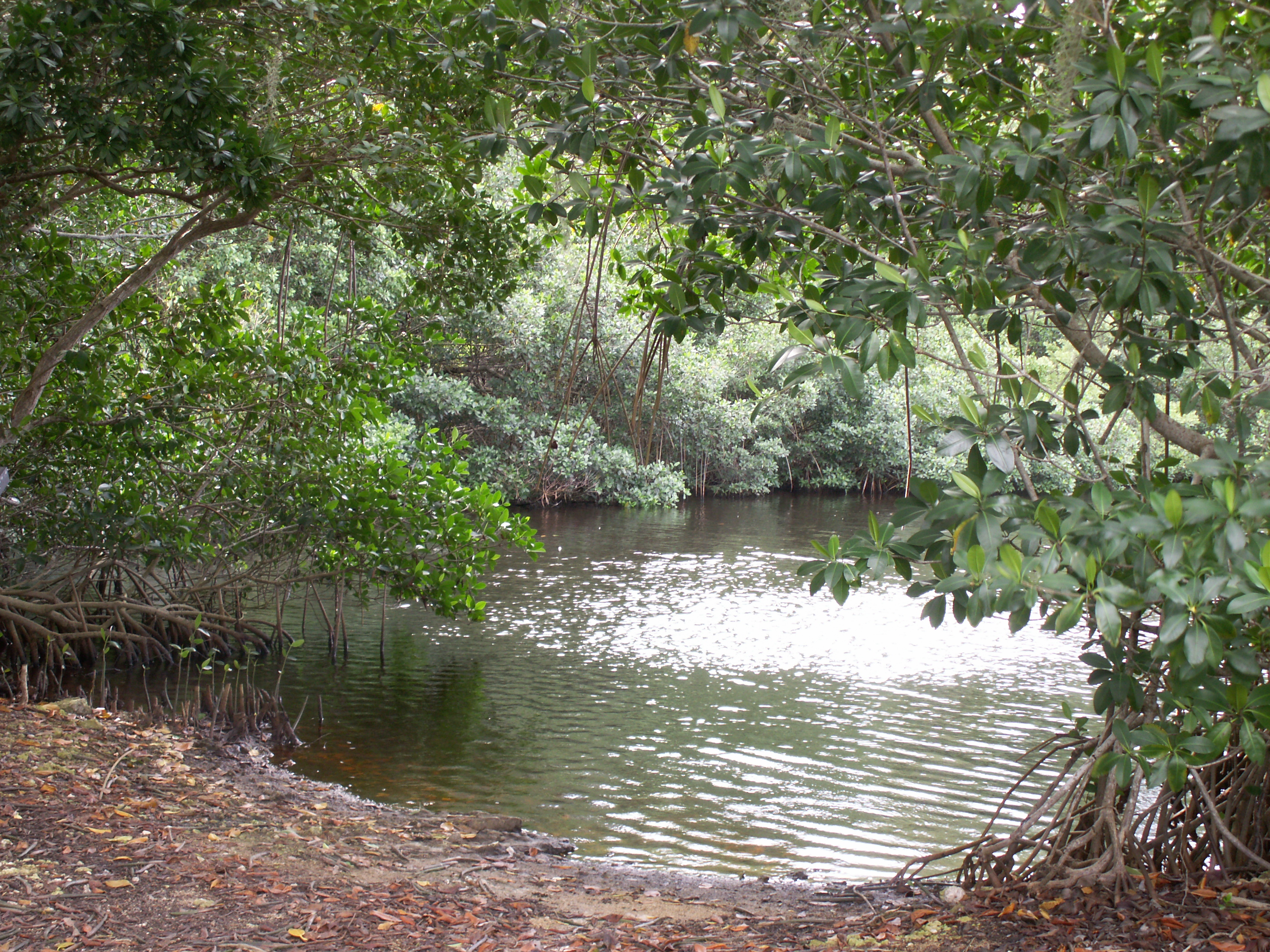
Red mangrove trees bordering a tidal estuary in the Everglades

Eventually the water from Lake Okeechobee and The Big Cypress makes its way to the ocean. Mangrove trees are well adapted to the transitional zone of brackish water where fresh and salt water meet. The estuarine ecosystem of the Ten Thousand Islands, which is comprised almost completely of mangrove forests, covers almost 200,000 acres (810 km^{2}). In the wet season fresh water pours out into Florida Bay, and sawgrass begins to grow closer to the coastline. In the dry season, and particularly in extended periods of drought, the salt water creeps inland into the coastal prairie, an ecosystem that buffers the freshwater marshes by absorbing sea water. Mangrove trees begin to grow in fresh water ecosystems when the salt water goes far enough inland.

There are three species of trees that are considered mangroves: red (Rhizophora mangle), black (Avicennia germinans), and white (Laguncularia racemosa), although all are from different families. All grow in oxygen-poor soil, can survive drastic water level changes, and are tolerant of salt, brackish, and fresh water. All three mangrove species are integral to coastline protection during severe storms. Red mangroves have the farthest-reaching roots, trapping sediments that help build coastlines after and between storms. All three types of trees absorb the energy of waves and storm surges. Everglades mangroves also serve as nurseries for crustaceans and fish, and rookeries for birds. The region supports Tortugas pink shrimp (Farfantepenaeus duorarum) and stone crab (Menippe mercenaria) industries; between 80 and 90 percent of commercially harvested crustacean species in Florida's salt waters are born or spend time near the Everglades.

=== Florida Bay ===
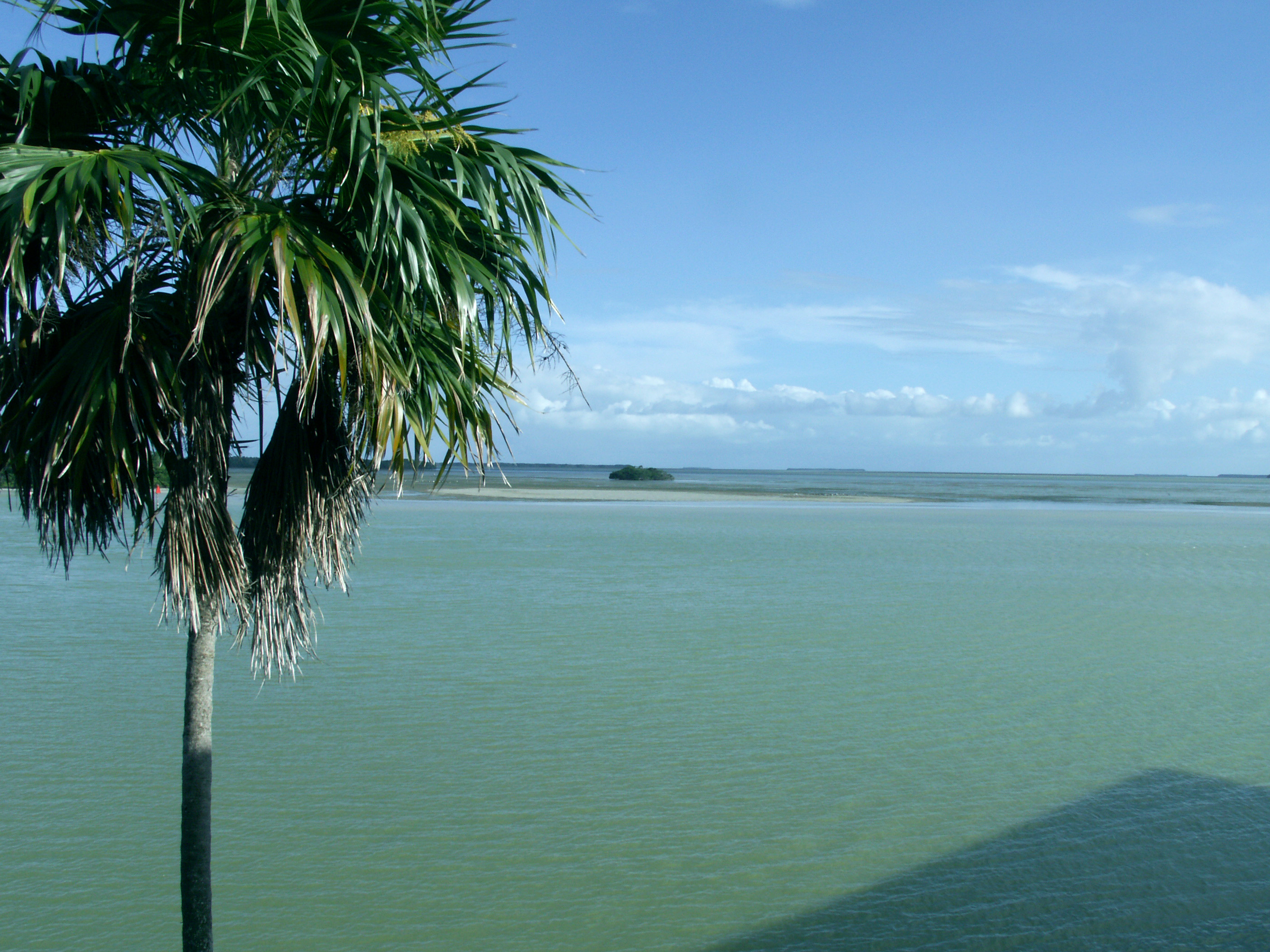
A clump of mangroves in the distance, Florida Bay at Flamingo

Much of the coast and the inner estuaries are built of mangroves; there is no border between the coastal marshes and the bay. Thus the marine ecosystems in Florida Bay are considered to be a part of the Everglades watershed and one of the ecosystems connected to and affected by the Everglades as a whole. More than 800 square miles (2,100 km^{2}) of Florida Bay is protected by Everglades National Park, representing the largest body of water in the park boundaries. There are approximately 100 keys in Florida Bay, many of which are mangrove forests. The fresh water coming into Florida Bay from the Everglades creates perfect conditions for vast beds of turtle grass and algae formations that are the foundation for animal life in the bay. Sea turtles and manatees eat the grass, while invertebrate animals, such as worms, clams and other mollusks eat the algae formations and microscopic plankton. Female sea turtles return annually to nest on the shore, and manatees spend the winter months in the warmer water of the bay. Sea grasses also serve to stabilize the sea beds and protect shorelines from erosion by absorbing energy from waves.

== History ==
=== Native Americans ===
Humans arrived in the Florida peninsula approximately 15,000 years ago. Paleo-Indians came to Florida probably following large game that included giant sloths, saber-toothed cats, and spectacled bears. They found an arid landscape that supported plants and animals adapted for desert conditions. However, 6,500 years ago, climate changes brought a wetter landscape; large animals became extinct in Florida, and the Paleo-Indians slowly adapted and became the Archaic peoples. They conformed to the environmental changes, and created many tools with the various resources available. During the Late Archaic period, the climate became wetter again, and approximately 3000 BCE the rise of water tables allowed an increase in population and cultural activity. Florida Indians developed into three distinct but similar cultures that were named for the bodies of water near where they were located: Okeechobee, Caloosahatchee, and Glades.

==== Calusa and Tequesta ====
Two major nations composed the Glades material culture: the Calusa and the Tequesta. The Calusa was the largest and most powerful nation in South Florida. It controlled fifty villages located on Florida's west coast, around Lake Okeechobee, and on the Florida Keys. Most Calusa villages were located at the mouths of rivers or on key islands. The Calusa were hunter-gatherers who lived on small game, fish, turtles, alligators, shellfish, and various plants. Most of their tools were made of bone or teeth, although sharpened reeds were also effective for hunting or war. Calusa weapons consisted of bows and arrows, atlatls, and spears. Canoes were used for transportation, and South Florida tribes often canoed through the Everglades, but rarely lived in them. Canoe trips to Cuba were also common.

Estimated numbers of Calusa at the beginning of the Spanish occupation ranged from 4,000 to 7,000. The society declined in power and population; by 1697 their number was estimated to be about 1,000. In the early 18th century, the Calusa came under attack from the Yamasee to the north. They asked the Spanish for refuge in Cuba, where almost 200 died of illness. Soon they were relocated again to the Florida Keys.

Second in power and number to the Calusa in South Florida were the Tequesta. They occupied the southeastern portion of the lower peninsula in modern-day Dade and Broward counties. Like the Calusa, the Tequesta societies centered on the mouths of rivers. Their main village was probably on the Miami River or Little River. Spanish depictions of the Tequesta state that they were greatly feared by sailors, who suspected them of torturing and killing survivors of shipwrecks. With an increasing European presence in south Florida, Native Americans from the Keys and other areas began increasing their trips to Cuba. Official permission for the immigration of Native Americans from the Florida Keys was granted by Cuban officials in 1704. Spanish priests attempted to set up missions in 1743, but noted that the Tequesta were under assault from a neighboring tribe. When only 30 members were left, they were removed to Havana. A British surveyor in 1770 described multiple deserted villages in the region where the Tequesta lived. Common descriptions of Native Americans in Florida by 1820 used only the term "Seminoles".

==== Seminole ====
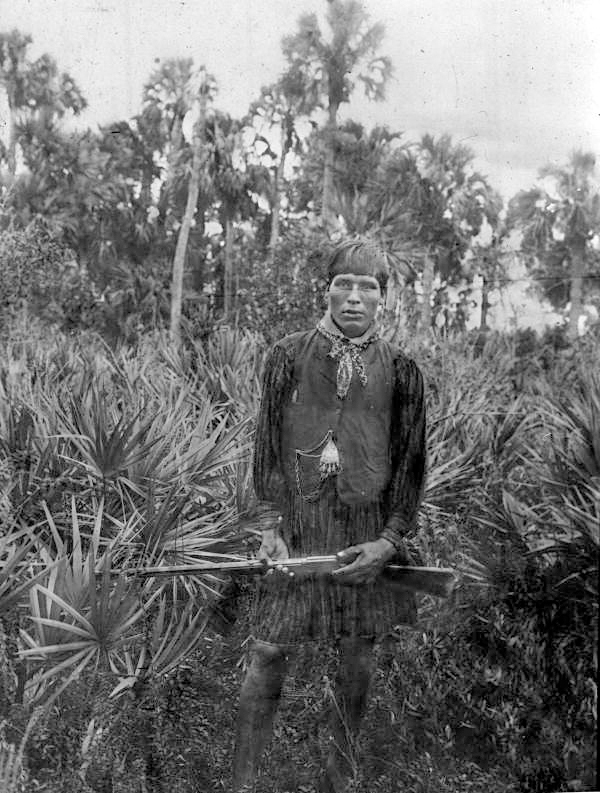
Seminoles made their home in the Everglades.

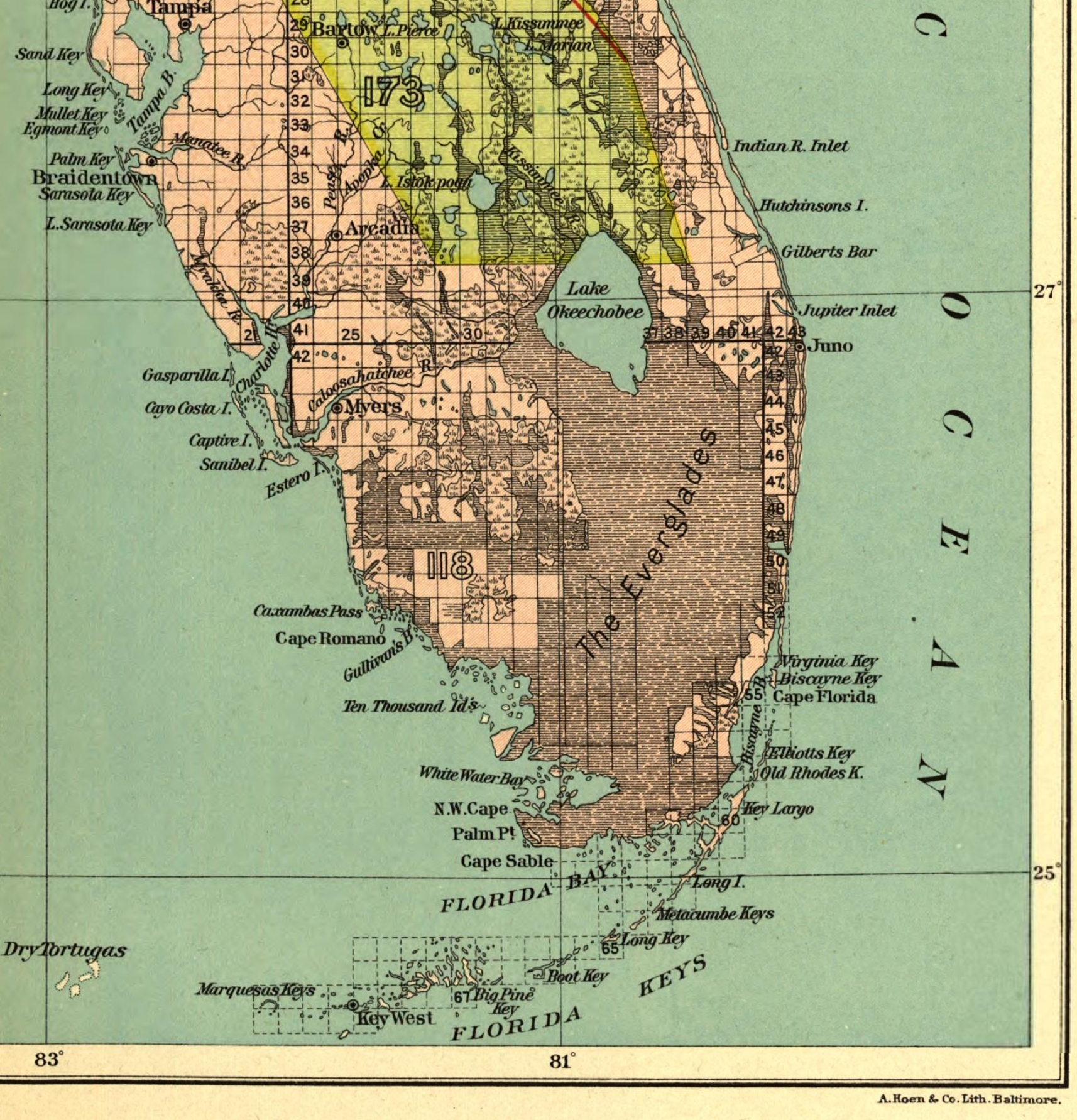
A Florida Indian Land Cessions map showing Cession 118 and Cession 173 (1832 Treaty with the Seminole). The Everglades' boundaries resisted early American settlement.

Following the demise of the Calusa and Tequesta, Native Americans in southern Florida were referred to as "Spanish Indians" in the 1740s, probably due to their friendlier relations with Spain. The Creek invaded the Florida peninsula; they conquered and assimilated what was left of pre-Columbian societies into the Creek Confederacy. They were joined by remnant Indian groups and formed the Seminole, a new tribe, by ethnogenesis. The Seminole originally settled in the northern portion of the territory. In addition, free blacks and fugitive slaves made their way to Florida, where Spain had promised slaves freedom and arms if they converted to Catholicism and pledged loyalty to Spain. These African Americans gradually created communities near those of the Seminole, and became known as the Black Seminoles. The groups acted as allies.

In 1817, Andrew Jackson invaded Florida to hasten its annexation to the United States, in what became known as the First Seminole War. After Florida became a U.S. territory in 1821, conflicts between settlers and the Seminole increased as the former tried to acquire lands. The Everglades and its vast wetland complex remained intact while surrounding territories were divided by two major treaties. The first was the 1823 Treaty of Moultrie Creek (Cession 118), which extended west of the Everglades. The second was the 1832 Treaty of Payne's Landing (Cession 173), which extended north from Lake Okeechobee.

The Second Seminole War lasted from 1835 to 1842, and afterward, the US forcibly removed about 3,000 Seminole and 800 Black Seminole to Indian Territory (now Oklahoma), west of the Mississippi River. Many others died in the war. Conflict broke out again in the Third Seminole War from 1855 to 1859, when a few hundred Seminole fought off US forces from the swamps of the Everglades. The US finally decided to leave them alone, as they could not dislodge them even after this protracted and expensive warfare.

By 1913, the Seminole in the Everglades numbered no more than 325. They made a living by hunting and trading with white settlers, and raised domesticated animals. The Seminole made their villages in hardwood hammocks or pinelands, had diets of hominy and coontie roots, fish, turtles, venison, and small game. Their villages were not large, due to the limited size of the hammocks. Between the end of the last Seminole War and 1930, the people lived in relative isolation from the majority culture.

The construction of the Tamiami Trail, beginning in 1928 and spanning the region from Tampa to Miami, altered their ways of life. Some began to work in local farms, ranches, and souvenir stands. Some of the people who interacted more with European Americans began to move to reservations in the 1940s. These were their bases for reorganizing their government and they became federally recognized in 1957 as the Seminole Tribe of Florida.

People who kept more traditional ways had settlements along the Tamiami Trail and tended to speak the Mikasuki language. They later were federally recognized in 1962 as the Miccosukee Tribe of Indians of Florida. As metropolitan areas in South Florida began to grow, the two groups were closely associated with the Everglades. They struggled to maintain privacy while serving as tourist attractions. They earned money by wrestling alligators and selling craftworks. As of 2008, the Seminole Tribe of Florida had five reservations, and the lands of the Miccosukee Tribe of Indians were collectively considered a sixth reservation. The two tribes have each developed casino gaming on some of their properties to generate revenue for support, services and economic development.

=== Exploration ===
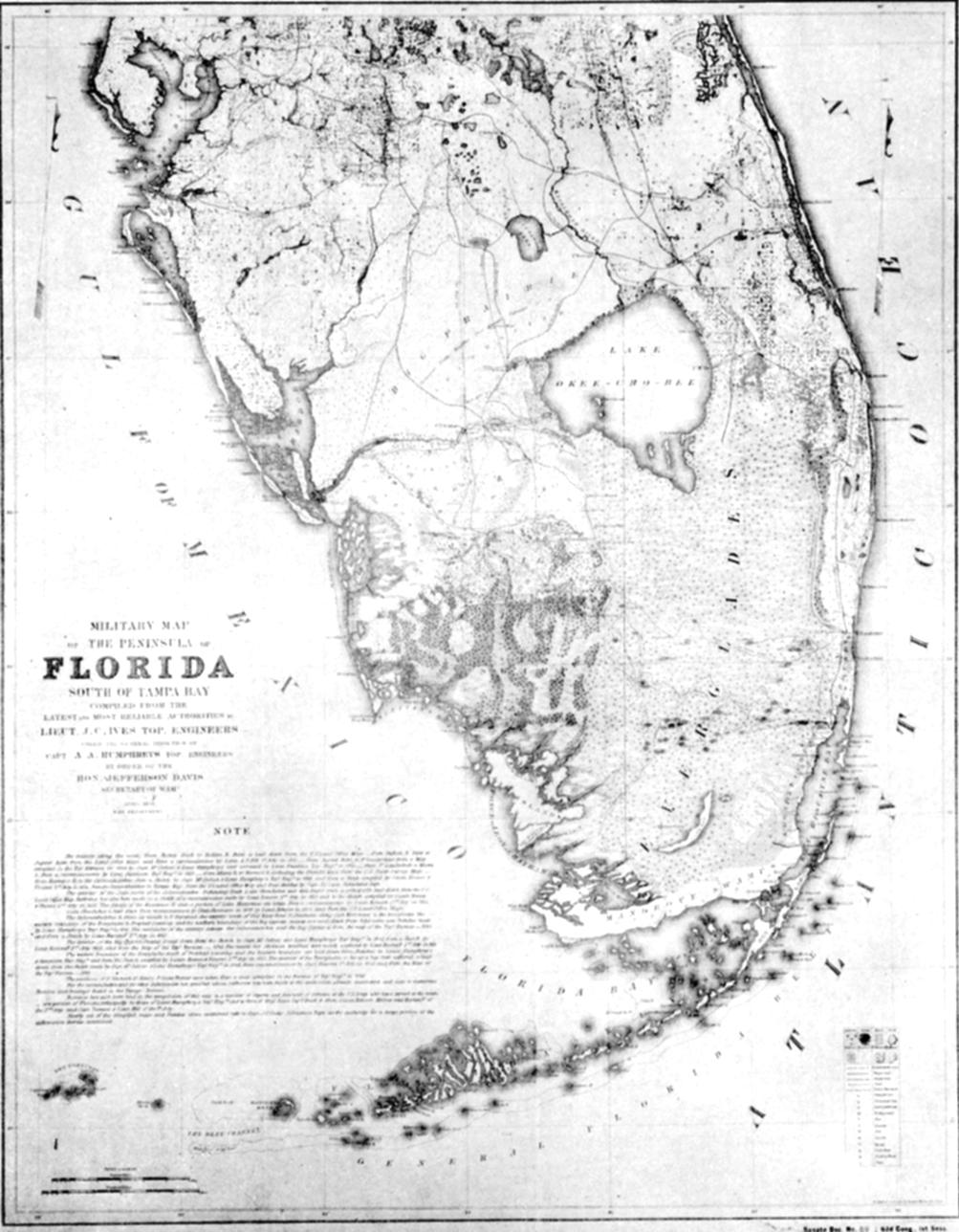
Map of the Everglades in 1856: Military action during the Seminole Wars improved understanding of the features of the Everglades.

The military penetration of southern Florida offered the opportunity to map a poorly understood and largely unknown part of the country. An 1840 expedition into the Everglades offered the first printed account for the general public to read about the Everglades. The anonymous writer described the terrain the party was crossing:

No country that I have ever heard of bears any resemblance to it; it seems like a vast sea filled with grass and green trees, and expressly intended as a retreat for the rascally Indian, from which the white man would never seek to drive them.

The land seemed to inspire extreme reactions of both wonder or hatred. During the Second Seminole War an army surgeon wrote, "It is in fact a most hideous region to live in, a perfect paradise for Indians, alligators, serpents, frogs, and every other kind of loathsome reptile."

A survey team led by railroad executive James Edmundson Ingraham explored the area in 1892. In 1897, explorer Hugh Willoughby spent eight days canoeing with a party from the mouth of the Harney River to the Miami River. He sent his observations to the New Orleans Times-Democrat. Willoughby described the water as healthy and wholesome, with numerous springs, and 10,000 alligators "more or less" in Lake Okeechobee. The party encountered thousands of birds near the Shark River, "killing hundreds, but they continued to return". Willoughby pointed out that much of the rest of the country had been explored and mapped except for this part of Florida, writing, "(w)e have a tract of land one hundred and thirty miles long and seventy miles wide that is as much unknown to the white man as the heart of Africa."

=== Drainage ===
A national push for expansion and progress in the United States occurred in the later part of the 19th century, which stimulated interest in draining the Everglades for agricultural use. According to historians, "From the middle of the nineteenth century to the middle of the twentieth century, the United States went through a period in which wetland removal was not questioned. Indeed, it was considered the proper thing to do." Draining the Everglades was suggested as early as 1837, and a resolution in Congress was passed in 1842 that prompted Secretary of Treasury Robert J. Walker to request those with experience in the Everglades to give their opinion on the possibility of drainage. Many officers who had served in the Seminole Wars favored the idea. In 1850 Congress passed a law that gave several states wetlands within their state boundaries. The Swamp and Overflowed Lands Act ensured that the state would be responsible for funding the attempts at developing wetlands into farmlands. Florida quickly formed a committee to consolidate grants to pay for any attempts, though the Civil War and Reconstruction halted progress until after 1877.

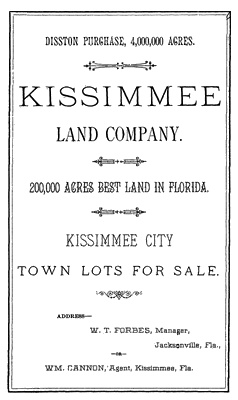
Hamilton Disston's land sale notice

After the Civil War, a state agency called the Internal Improvement Fund (IIF), whose purpose was to improve Florida's roads, canals, and rail lines, was discovered to be deeply in debt. The IIF found a Pennsylvania real estate developer named Hamilton Disston interested in implementing plans to drain the land for agriculture. Disston purchased 4,000,000 acres (16,000 km^{2}) of land for $1 million in 1881, and he began constructing canals near St. Cloud. At first, the canals seemed to work in lowering the water levels in the wetlands surrounding the rivers. They were effective in lowering the groundwater, but it became apparent that their capacity was insufficient for the wet season. Although Disston's canals did not drain well, his purchase primed the economy of Florida. It made news and attracted tourists and land buyers. Within four years property values doubled, and the population increased significantly.

The IIF was able to invest in development projects due to Disston's purchase, and an opportunity to improve transportation arose when oil tycoon Henry Flagler began purchasing land and building rail lines along the east coast of Florida, as far south as Palm Beach in 1893. Along the way he built resort hotels, transforming territorial outposts into tourist destinations. The land bordering the rail lines was developed as citrus farms. By 1896 the rail line had been extended to Biscayne Bay. Three months after the first train had arrived, the residents of Miami voted to incorporate the town. Miami became a prime destination for extremely wealthy people after the Royal Palm Hotel was opened.

During the 1904 gubernatorial race, the strongest candidate, Napoleon Bonaparte Broward, a populist Democrat from Duval County, promoted draining the Everglades. He called the future of South Florida the "Empire of the Everglades". Soon after his successful election, he began work to "drain that abominable pestilence-ridden swamp", and pushed the Florida legislature to form a group of commissioners to oversee reclamation of flooded lands. In 1907 they established the Everglades Drainage District and began to study how to build the most effective canals, and how to fund them. Governor Broward ran for the U.S. Senate in 1908 but lost. Broward was paid by land developer Richard J. Bolles to tour the state to promote drainage. Elected to the Senate in 1910, Broward died before he could take office. Land in the Everglades was being sold for $15 an acre a month after Broward died. Meanwhile, Henry Flagler continued to build railway stations at towns as soon as the populations warranted them.

=== Growth of urban areas ===
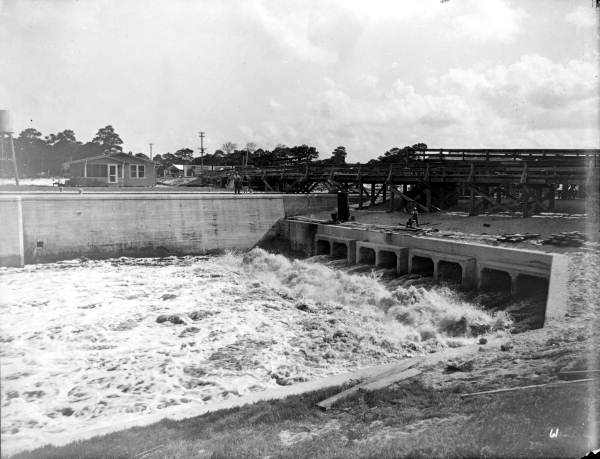
A canal lock in the Everglades Drainage District around 1915

With the construction of canals, newly reclaimed Everglades land was promoted throughout the United States. Land developers sold 20,000 lots in a few months in 1912. Advertisements promised within eight weeks of arrival, a farmer could be making a living, although for many it took at least two months to clear the land. Some tried burning off the sawgrass or other vegetation, only to learn that the peat continued to burn. Animals and tractors used for plowing got mired in the muck and were useless. When the muck dried, it turned to a fine black powder and created dust storms. Although initially crops sprouted quickly and lushly, they just as quickly wilted and died, seemingly without reason.

The increasing population in towns near the Everglades hunted in the area. Raccoons and otters were the most widely hunted for their skins. Hunting often went unchecked; in one trip, a Lake Okeechobee hunter killed 250 alligators and 172 otters. Water birds were a particular target of plume hunting. Bird feathers were used in women's hats in the late 19th and early 20th centuries.

In 1886, 5 million birds were estimated to be killed for their feathers. They were shot usually in the spring, when their feathers were colored for mating and nesting. The plumes, or aigrettes, as they were called in the millinery business, sold for $32 an ounce in 1915—the price of gold. Millinery was a $17 million a year industry that motivated plume harvesters to lay in watch of nests of egrets and many colored birds during the nesting season, shoot the parents with small-bore rifles, and leave the chicks to starve. Plumes from Everglades wading birds could be found in Havana, New York City, London, and Paris. Hunters could collect plumes from a hundred birds on a good day.

Rum-runners used the Everglades as a hiding spot during Prohibition; it was so vast there were never enough law enforcement officers to patrol it. The arrival of the railroad, and the discovery that adding trace elements like copper was the remedy for crops sprouting and dying quickly, soon created a population boom. New towns such as Moore Haven, Clewiston, and Belle Glade sprouted like the crops. Sugarcane became the primary crop grown in South Florida. Miami experienced a second real estate boom that earned a developer in Coral Gables $150 million. Undeveloped land north of Miami sold for $30,600 an acre. In 1925, Miami newspapers published editions weighing over 7 pounds (3.2 kg), most of it in real estate advertising. Waterfront property was the most highly valued. Mangrove trees were cut down and replaced with palm trees to improve the view. Acres of South Florida slash pine were cleared. Some of the pine was for lumber, but most of the pine forests in Dade County were cleared for development.

=== Flood control ===
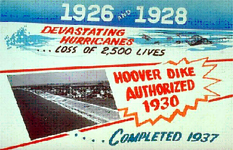
A sign advertising the completion of the Herbert Hoover Dike

Two catastrophic hurricanes in 1926 and 1928 caused Lake Okeechobee to breach its levees, killing thousands of people. The government began to focus on the control of floods rather than drainage. The Okeechobee Flood Control District was created in 1929, financed by both state and federal funds. President Herbert Hoover toured the towns affected by the 1928 Okeechobee Hurricane and ordered the Army Corps of Engineers to assist the communities surrounding the lake. Between 1930 and 1937 a dike 66 miles (106 km) long was built around the southern edge of the lake. Control of the Hoover Dike and the waters of Lake Okeechobee was delegated to federal powers: the United States declared legal limits of the lake to between 14 and 17 feet (4.3 and 5.2 m). A massive canal was also constructed 80 feet (24 m) wide and 6 feet (1.8 m) deep through the Caloosahatchee River; whenever the lake rose too high, the excess water left through the canal. More than $20 million was spent on the entire project. Sugarcane production soared after the dike and canal were built. The populations of the small towns surrounding the lake jumped from 3,000 to 9,000 after World War II.

Immediately, the effects of the Hoover Dike were seen. An extended drought occurred in the 1930s; with the wall preventing water from leaving Lake Okeechobee and canals and ditches removing other water, the Everglades became parched. Peat turned to dust. Salt ocean water intruded into Miami's wells; when the city brought in an expert to explain why, he discovered that the water in the Everglades was the area's groundwater—here, it appeared on the surface. In 1939, a million acres (4,000 km^{2}) of Everglades burned, and the black clouds of peat and sawgrass fires hung over Miami. Scientists who took soil samples before draining did not take into account that the organic composition of peat and muck in the Everglades make it prone to soil subsidence when it becomes dry. Naturally occurring bacteria in Everglades peat and muck assist with the process of decomposition under water, which is generally very slow, partially due to the low levels of dissolved oxygen. When water levels became so low that peat and muck were at the surface, the bacteria interacted with much higher levels of oxygen in the air, rapidly breaking down the soil. In some places, homes had to be moved to stilts and 8 feet (2.4 m) of soil was lost.

==== Everglades National Park ====
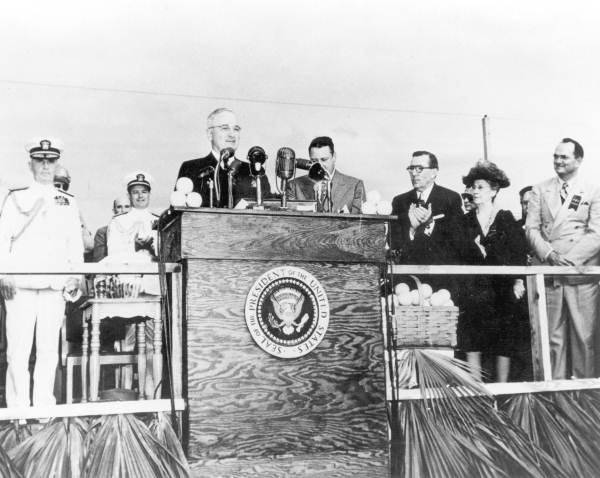
President Harry Truman dedicating Everglades National Park on December 6, 1947

The idea of a national park for the Everglades was pitched in 1928, when a Miami land developer named Ernest F. Coe established the Everglades Tropical National Park Association. It had enough support to be declared a national park by Congress in 1934. It took another 13 years to be dedicated on December 6, 1947. One month before the dedication of the park, a former editor from The Miami Herald and freelance writer named Marjory Stoneman Douglas released her first book titled The Everglades: River of Grass. After researching the region for five years, she described the history and ecology of South Florida in great detail. She characterized the Everglades as a river instead of a stagnant swamp. The last chapter was titled "The Eleventh Hour" and warned that the Everglades were dying, although it could be reversed.

==== Central and Southern Florida Flood Control Project ====
The same year the park was dedicated, two hurricanes and the wet season caused 100 inches (250 cm) to fall on South Florida. Although there were no human casualties, agricultural interests lost approximately $59 million (equivalent to $798 million in 2025). In 1948, Congress approved the Central and Southern Florida Project for Flood Control and Other Purposes (C&SF), which divided the Everglades into basins. In the northern Everglades were Water Conservation Areas (WCAs), and the Everglades Agricultural Area (EAA) bordering to the south of Lake Okeechobee. In the southern Everglades was Everglades National Park. Levees and pumping stations bordered each WCA, and released water in dryer times or removed it and pumped it to the ocean in times of flood. The WCAs took up approximately 37 percent of the original Everglades. The C&SF constructed over 1,000 miles (1,600 km) of canals, and hundreds of pumping stations and levees within three decades. During the 1950s and 1960s the Miami metropolitan area grew four times as fast as the rest of the nation. Between 1940 and 1965, 6 million people moved to South Florida: 1,000 people moved to Miami every week. Developed areas between the mid-1950s and the late 1960s quadrupled. Much of the water reclaimed from the Everglades was sent to newly developed areas.

==== Everglades Agricultural Area ====
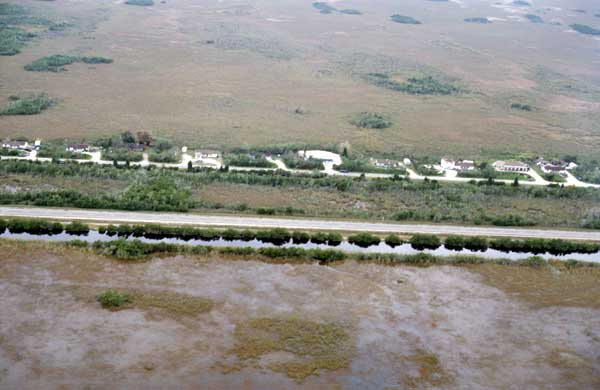
A 2003 U.S. Geological Survey photo showing the border between Water Conservation Area 3 (bottom) with water, and Everglades National Park, dry (top)

The C&SF established 470,000 acres (1,900 km^{2}) for the Everglades Agricultural Area—27 percent of the Everglades prior to development. In the late 1920s, agricultural experiments indicated that adding large amounts of manganese sulfate to Everglades muck produced a profitable harvest for vegetables. The primary cash crop in the EAA is sugarcane, though sod, beans, lettuce, celery, and rice are also grown. Fields in the EAA are typically 40 acres (160,000 m^{2}), bordered by canals on two sides, that are connected to larger canals where water is pumped in or out depending on the needs of the crops. The fertilizers used on vegetables, along with high concentrations of nitrogen and phosphorus that are the byproduct of decayed soil necessary for sugarcane production, were pumped into WCAs south of the EAA. The introduction of large amounts of these chemicals provided opportunities for exotic plants to take hold in the Everglades. One of the defining characteristics of natural Everglades ecology is its ability to support itself in a nutrient-poor environment, and the introduction of fertilizers began to alter the plant life in the region.

==== Jetport proposition ====
A turning point came for development in the Everglades at the proposal in the late 1960s for an expanded airport, after Miami International Airport outgrew its capacities. The new jetport was planned to be larger than O'Hare, Dulles, JFK, and LAX airports combined, and the chosen location was 6 miles (9.7 km) north of Everglades National Park. The first sentence of the U.S. Department of Interior study of the environmental impact of the jetport read, "Development of the proposed jetport and its attendant facilities ... will inexorably destroy the south Florida ecosystem and thus the Everglades National Park". When studies indicated the proposed jetport would create 4,000,000 US gallons (15,000,000 L) of raw sewage a day and 10,000 short tons (9,100 t) of jet engine pollutants a year, the project met staunch opposition. The New York Times called it a "blueprint for disaster", and Wisconsin senator Gaylord Nelson wrote to President Richard Nixon voicing his opposition: "It is a test of whether or not we are really committed in this country to protecting our environment." Governor Claude Kirk withdrew his support for the project, and Marjory Stoneman Douglas was persuaded at 79 years old to go on tour to give hundreds of speeches against it. Nixon instead proposed Big Cypress National Preserve, announcing it in the Special Message to the Congress Outlining the 1972 Environmental Program. Although construction of only one runway was completed, the remains of the Everglades Jetport was later opened as the Dade-Collier Training and Transition Airport and is sometimes used as an aviation training facility.

== Restoration ==
The International Union for Conservation of Nature (IUCN) World Heritage Outlook cited the Everglades National Park 2020 Conservation Outlook as "Critical". Assessment of current trends were concluded to be "deteriorating" with "very high threat" to the overall health of the ecosystem. Some ecological features now lost cannot be restored as they were initially developed over decades to centuries. The surviving ecological features are of vital importance to protect due to their essential support of the state of Florida and their unique properties, unknown elsewhere in the world and are of invaluable consequence to multiple fields of study.

Major contributors to this decline include water quality (nutrient pollution), quantity (reduced water flow), distribution, and timing; invasive species; climate change (sea-level rise, etc.); ocean acidification; and hurricanes. Other significant threats to the restoration and conservation of the Everglades are lagging logistic and legislative action. Restoration projects in other areas of Florida (i.e. Tamami Trail Next Steps, water storage and treatment south of Lake Okeechobee, etc.), as well as decompartmentalization of the varying jurisdictions and regional water quality/quantity measures which are upstream of the ecosystem, have not received adequate attention, but are essential to prevent further loss. Studies done in efforts to help restoration by Almeida et al. (2022) was done to showcase the effect of hydrology on the microbiome and how this will help restore the everglade, samples from the soils were aseptically collected in May 2018 from the center of eight thriving tree islands at the Loxahatchee then an experiment manipulating microbial community was conducted this concluded a 52% higher germination rate higher in microbial treatment microcosms relative to uninoculated microcosms. This study by Almeida et al. (2022) showcased the importance of microbes in the soil in how hydrology influences them and the key role they play in plant performance and restoration.

While some Everglades Restoration projects have been completed, critical plans remain incomplete. Further, pre-CERP components of current plans overestimated the hydrologic and ecologic benefits of these plans, and restoration projects to be complete by 2027 that address these "benefit setbacks" lack timely funding.

Recent changes in internal site policies have been lauded as showing promising improvement, including improved consistency in the management of park visitor activities, efforts to deal with invasive species, improving prescribed fire activities, and increasing financing opportunities for internal park projects. However, although the site itself is increasing work to deal with salient issues, support at the local, state, and federal level have not been in proportion to the critical nature of conservation efforts.

=== Kissimmee River ===
The Central and Southern Florida Flood Control Project's final construction project was straightening the Kissimmee River, a meandering 90-mile-long (140 km) river that was drained to make way for grazing land and agriculture. The C&SF started building the C-38 canal in 1962 and the effects were seen almost immediately. Waterfowl, wading birds, and fish disappeared, prompting conservationists and sport fishers to demand the region be restored before the canal was finished in 1971. In general, C&SF projects had been criticized for being temporary fixes that ignored future consequences, costing billions of dollars with no end in sight. After Governor Bob Graham initiated the Save Our Everglades campaign in 1983, the first section of the canal was backfilled in 1986. Graham announced that by 2000 the Everglades would be restored as closely as possible to its pre-drainage state. The Kissimmee River Restoration project was approved by Congress in 1992. It is estimated that it will cost $578 million to convert only 22 miles (35 km) of the canal. The entire project was to be complete by 2011, yet as of 2017, the project is "more than halfway complete" and the new completion date is 2020.

=== Water quality ===
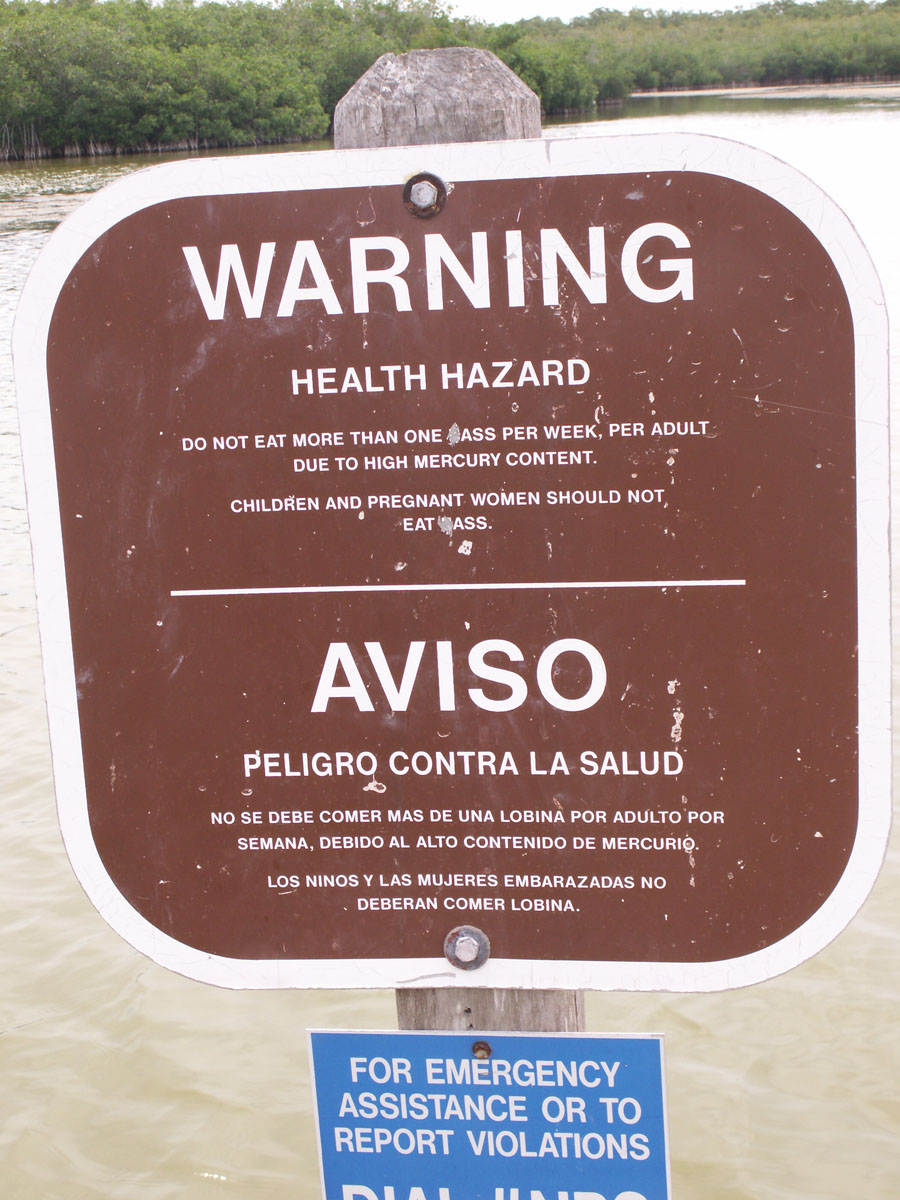
Warnings are placed in Everglades National Park to dissuade people from eating fish due to high mercury content. This warning explicitly mentions bass.

Further problems with the environment arose when a vast algal bloom appeared in one-fifth of Lake Okeechobee in 1986, the same year cattails were discovered overtaking sawgrass marshes in Loxahatchee National Wildlife Refuge. Scientists discovered that phosphorus, used as a fertilizer in the EAA, was flushed into canals and pumped back into the lake. When the lake drained, the phosphorus entered the water in the marshes, changing the nutrient levels. It kept periphyton from forming marl, one of two soils in the Everglades. The arrival of phosphorus allowed cattails to spread quickly. The cattails grew in dense mats—too thick for birds or alligators to nest in. It also dissolved oxygen in the peat, promoted algae, and prohibited the growth of native invertebrates on the bottom of the food chain.

At the same time mercury was found in local fish at such high levels that consumption warnings were posted for fishermen. A Florida panther was found dead with levels of mercury high enough to kill a human. Scientists found that power plants and incinerators using fossil fuels were expelling mercury into the atmosphere, and it fell as rain or dust during droughts. The naturally occurring bacteria that reduce sulfur in the Everglades ecosystem were transforming the mercury into methylmercury, and it was bioaccumulating through the food chain. Stricter emissions standards helped lower mercury coming from power plants and incinerators, which in turn lowered mercury levels found in animals, though they continue to be a concern.

In recent studies of the water quality, the studies showed how the different cycles throughout the year in Lake Okeechobee affect the cyanobacteria bloom, which include toxin-producing Microcystis aeruginosa that cause microcystin, a strong kind of hepatotoxin that affects both humans and animals. The studied showcased the movement of diurnal cycles of atmospheric forcing and diel vertical migration this concluded that during the summer cyanobacteria concentrated in the northern and central and a concentration in the western lake during the spring and fall. The flow of the lake carries cyanobacteria and other phytoplankton cells into estuaries; this can lead to water quality deterioration.

Salinity also affects water quality, a study conducted by Wilson et al. (2018) to research and understand how the sea-level rise and salinity intrusion affected the wetlands cycling and how the balance is affected. The team of Wilson et al. (2018) conducted a two-year experiment where they manipulated salinity in pockets of water both brackish and fresh within the everglades, the findings were that when water levels receded below the soil the amount of carbon produced was three times higher. The study by Wilson et al. (2018) also found that after two years the biomass in the brackish water was greatly decreased. Wilson et al. (2018) concluded that a combination of the higher carbon levels and a significant loss of live roots contribute to the collapse of peat soil observed in the coastal Everglades.

The Everglades Forever Act, introduced by Governor Lawton Chiles in 1994, was an attempt to legislate the lowering of phosphorus in Everglades waterways. The act put the South Florida Water Management District (SFWMD) and the Florida Department of Environmental Protection (DEP) in charge of testing and enforcing low phosphorus levels: 10 parts per billion (ppb) (down from 500 ppb in the 1980s). The SFWMD built Stormwater Treatment Areas (STAs) near sugarcane fields where water leaving the EAA flows into ponds lined with lime rock and layers of peat and calcareous periphyton. Testing has shown this method to be more effective than previously anticipated, bringing levels from 80 ppb to 10 ppb.

=== Invasive species ===
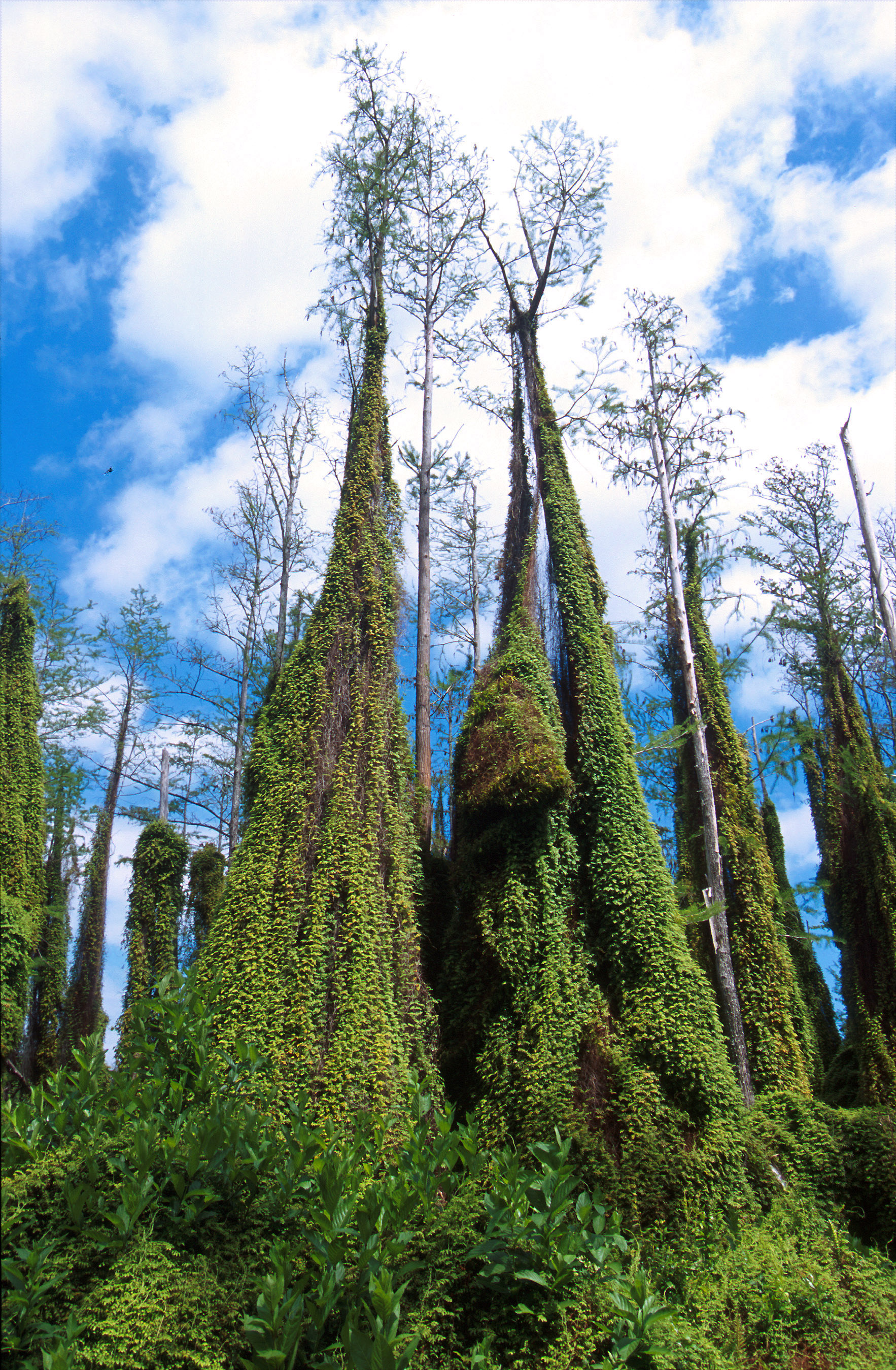
Climbing ferns overtake cypress trees in the Everglades. The ferns act as "fire ladders" that can destroy trees that would otherwise survive fires.

As a center for trade and travel between the U.S., the Caribbean, and South America, South Florida is especially vulnerable to invasive species, or species of plants and animals that adapt aggressively to conditions in the Everglades, allowing them to reproduce faster and grow larger than they would naturally in their native environments. Approximately 26% of all species of fish, reptiles, birds, and mammals in South Florida are exotic—more than in any other part of the U.S.—and the region hosts one of the highest numbers of exotic plant species in the world. Controlling invasive species in 1,700,000 acres (6,900 km^{2}) of infested land in South Florida costs authorities about $500 million a year.

The Everglades hosts 1,392 exotic plant species actively reproducing in the region, outnumbering the 1,301 species considered native to South Florida. The melaleuca tree (Melaleuca quinquenervia) takes water in greater amounts than other trees. Melaleucas grow taller and more densely in the Everglades than in their native Australia, making them unsuitable as nesting areas for birds with wide wingspans. They also choke out native vegetation. More than $2 million has been spent on keeping them out of Everglades National Park.

Brazilian pepper, or Florida holly (Schinus terebinthifolius), has also wreaked havoc on the Everglades, exhibiting a tendency to spread rapidly and to crowd out native species of plants as well as to create inhospitable environments for native animals. It is especially difficult to eradicate and is readily propagated by birds, which eat its small red berries. The Brazilian pepper problem is not exclusive to the Everglades; neither is the water hyacinth (Eichhornia crassipes), which is a widespread problem in Florida's waterways, a major threat to endemic species, and is difficult and costly to eradicate. The Old World climbing fern (Lygodium microphyllum) may be causing the most harm to restoration as it blankets areas thickly, making it impossible for animals to pass through. It also climbs up trees and creates "fire ladders", allowing parts of the trees to burn that would otherwise remain unharmed.

Melaleuca is a tree that has caused significant damage to the Everglades ecosystem. According to Florida Fish and Conservation Wildlife Commission (2025) the Melaleuca is an evergreen tree that can grow to over 65 feet (20 m) in height, its features include brown or peppery white bark, lanceolate leaves, cream white or pink flowers. It's estimated to inhabit 400,000 acres (160,000 ha) in South Florida and originally from New Guinea and Australia. The Florida Fish and Conservation Wildlife Commission (2025) also states that species has displacing native of South Florida including its vegetation in wetland and upland environments, this tree grows quickly 3–6 feet (0.91–1.83 m) per year and form dense stands that cause displacement for the native vegetation, they form a sort of forest in area that would have been tree less sawgrass marches disturbing water flow and causing a fire hazard as leaves are also a due to oils that reside within them.

Many pets have escaped or been released into the Everglades from the surrounding urban areas. Some find the conditions quite favorable and have established self-sustaining populations, competing for food and space with native animals. Many tropical fish have been released, but blue tilapias (Oreochromis aureus) cause damage to shallow waterways by creating large nests and consuming aquatic plants that protect native young fish.

Native to southern Asia, the Burmese python (Python molurus bivittatus) is a relatively new invasive species in the Everglades. This species can grow up to 20 feet (6.1 m) long, and they compete with alligators for the top of the food chain. Florida wildlife officials speculate that escaped pythons have begun reproducing in an environment for which they are well-suited. Studies done by Leatherman and Leatherman (2024) the effects of the Burmese python invasive has been detrimental to the ecosystem of the everglades a study done using computerized methods where malleable model is used to try and predict the rapid growth of the Burmese python computed that from an initial 30,000-300,000 population size the population could easily grow to over 600,000 within the next five years. The study from Leatherman and Leatherman (2024) also talked about the factors that can lead to such a rapid growth such as the number of eggs laid by a single python 40-100 eggs, the lack of predation due to the eggs being well protected, and the large hatch size of the pythons at 51cms giving the Burmese python hatchlings a great survival chance. Another study by Dorcas et al. (2012) showed a dramatic increase in ENP sightings within the native mammal population, this includes opossums, bobcats, and racoons. The study from Dorcas et al. (2012) says that for the last 16million years there has not been a snake big enough to prey on the medium size mammals causing a major disturbance to the food web of the ecosystem.

In 2017 The South Florida Water Management District implemented the Python Elimination program, hoping to encourage the public to participate in the removal of the snakes by placing a cash reward per foot of python captured and euthanized with an additional wage pay and $200 per active nest found. In Everglades National Park alone, agents removed more than 2,000 Burmese pythons from the park as of 2017. Federal authorities banned four species of exotic snakes, including the Burmese python, in 2012. The pythons are believed to be responsible for drastic decreases in the populations of some mammals within the park. In a 2015 study by the United States Geological Survey, Florida Fish and Wildlife Conservation Commission, and the University of Florida, 95 adult marsh rabbits were released and tracked in areas known to have invasive python populations. 11 months later, it was found that 77% of the rabbits that fell victim to predation, was due to pythons. Relationships like these are believed to be a reason for declining native predator populations such as the Florida Panther that has less than 500 remaining individuals in the wild.

=== Comprehensive Everglades Restoration Plan ===
Although scientists made headway in decreasing mercury and phosphorus levels in water, the natural environment of South Florida continued to decline in the 1990s, and life in nearby cities reflected this downturn. To address the deterioration of the Miami metropolitan area, Governor Lawton Chiles commissioned a report on the sustainability of the area. In 1995, Chiles published the commission's findings in a report that related the degradation of the Everglades ecosystems to the lower quality of life in urban areas. The report noted past environmental abuses that brought the state to a position to make a decision. Not acting to improve the South Florida ecosystem, the report predicted, would inevitably cause further and intolerable deterioration that would harm local tourism by 12,000 jobs and $200 million annually, and commercial fishing by 3,300 jobs and $52 million annually. Urban areas had grown beyond their capacities to sustain themselves. Crowded cities were facing problems such as high crime rates, traffic jams, severely overcrowded schools, and overtaxed public services; the report noted that water shortages were ironic, given the 53 inches (130 cm) of rain the region received annually.

In 1999, an evaluation of the C&SF was submitted to Congress as part of the Water Development Act of 1992. The seven-year report, called the "Restudy", cited indicators of harm to the ecosystem: a 50 percent reduction in the original Everglades, diminished water storage, harmful timing of water releases from canals and pumping stations, an 85 to 90 percent decrease in wading bird populations over the past 50 years, and the decline of output from commercial fisheries. Bodies of water including Lake Okeechobee, the Caloosahatchee River, St. Lucie estuary, Lake Worth Lagoon, Biscayne Bay, Florida Bay and the Everglades reflected drastic water level changes, hypersalinity, and dramatic changes in marine and freshwater ecosystems. The Restudy noted the overall decline in water quality over the past 50 years was due to loss of wetlands that act as filters for polluted water. It predicted that without intervention the entire South Florida ecosystem would deteriorate. Water shortages would become common and some cities would have annual water restrictions.

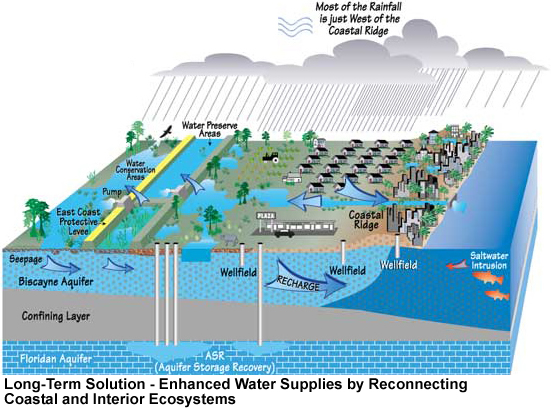
Planned water recovery and storage implementation using CERP strategies

The Restudy came with a plan to stop the declining environmental quality, and this proposal was to be the most expensive and comprehensive ecological repair project in history. The Comprehensive Everglades Restoration Plan (CERP) proposed more than 60 construction projects over 30 years to store water that was being flushed into the ocean, in reservoirs, underground aquifers, and abandoned quarries; add more Stormwater Treatment Areas to filter water that flowed into the lower Everglades; regulate water released from pumping stations into local waterways and improve water released to Everglades National Park and Water Conservation Areas; remove barriers to sheetflow by raising the Tamiami Trail and destroying the Miami Canal, and reuse wastewater for urban areas. The cost estimate for the entire plan was $7.8 billion, and in a bipartisan show of cooperation, CERP was voted through Congress with an overwhelming margin. It was signed by President Bill Clinton on December 11, 2000.

Since its signing, the State of Florida reports that it has spent more than $2 billion on the various projects. More than 36,000 acres (150 km^{2}) of Stormwater Treatment Areas have been constructed to filter 2,500 short tons (2,300 t) of phosphorus from Everglades waters. An STA spanning 17,000 acres (69 km^{2}) was constructed in 2004, making it the largest manmade wetland in the world. Fifty-five percent of the land necessary to acquire for restoration has been purchased by the State of Florida, totaling 210,167 acres (850.52 km^{2}). A plan to hasten the construction and funding of projects was put into place, named "Acceler8", spurring the start of six of eight large construction projects, including that of three large reservoirs. However, federal funds have not been forthcoming; CERP was signed when the U.S. government had a budget surplus, but since then deficits have renewed, and two of CERP's major supporters in Congress retired. According to a story in The New York Times, state officials say the restoration is lost in a maze of "federal bureaucracy, a victim of 'analysis paralysis'". CERP still remains controversial as the projects slated for Acceler8, environmental activists note, are those that benefit urban areas, and regions in the Everglades in desperate need of water are still being neglected, suggesting that water is being diverted to make room for more people in an already overtaxed environment.

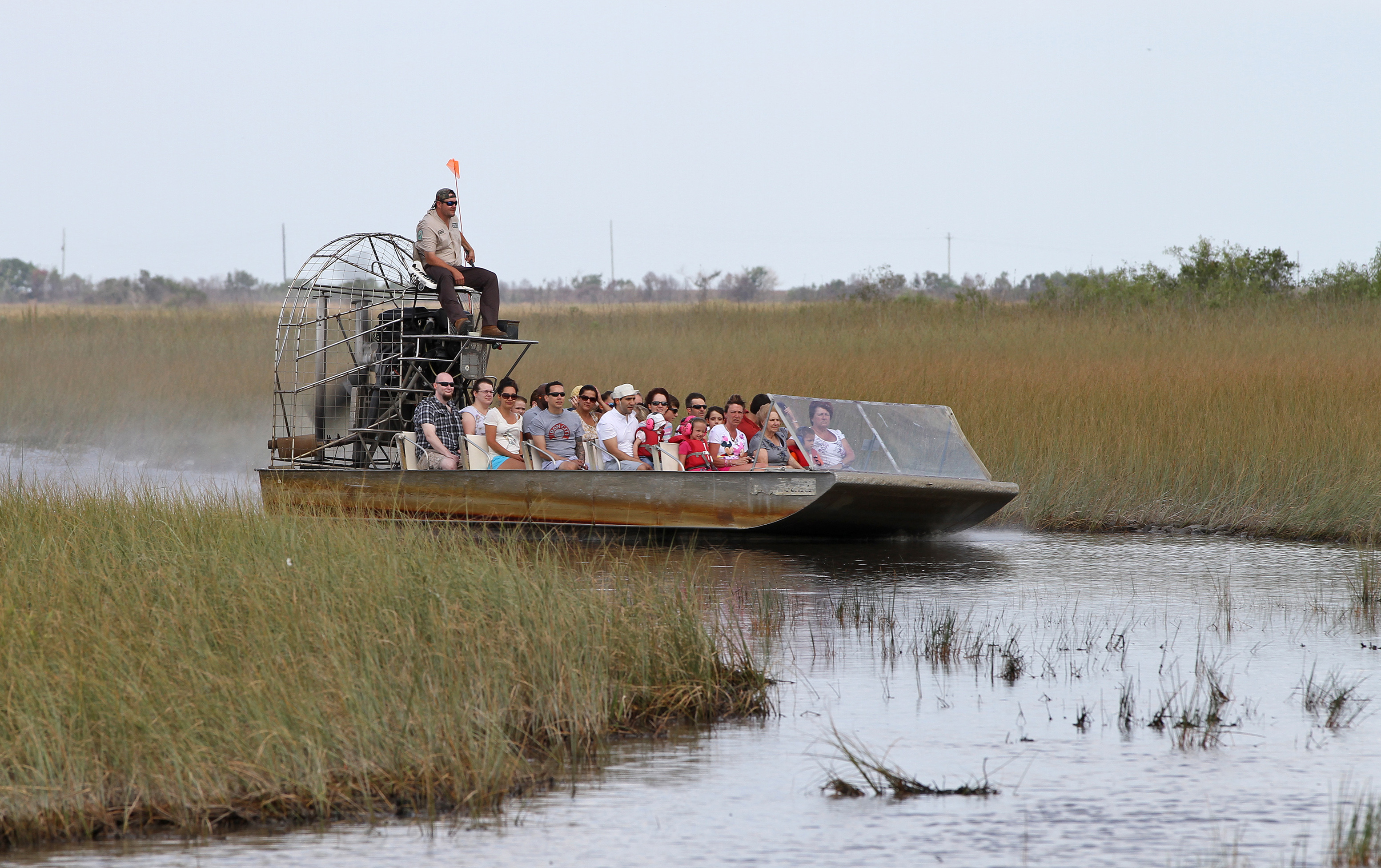
Airboating has become a popular ecotourism attraction in the Everglades.

A series of biennial reports from the U.S. National Research Council have reviewed the progress of CERP. The fourth report in the series, released in 2012, found that little progress has been made in restoring the core of the remaining Everglades ecosystem; instead, most project construction so far has occurred along its periphery. The report noted that to reverse ongoing ecosystem declines, it will be necessary to expedite restoration projects that target the central Everglades, and to improve both the quality and quantity of the water in the ecosystem. To better understand the potential implications of the current slow pace of progress, the report assessed the current status of ten Everglades ecosystem attributes, including phosphorus loads, peat depth, and populations of snail kites, birds of prey that are endangered in South Florida. Most attributes received grades ranging from C (degraded) to D (significantly degraded), but the snail kite received a grade of F (near irreversible damage). The report also assessed the future trajectory of each ecosystem attribute under three restoration scenarios: improved water quality, improved hydrology, and improvements to both water quality and hydrology, which helped highlight the urgency of restoration actions to benefit a wide range of ecosystem attributes and demonstrate the cost of inaction. Overall, the report concluded that substantial near-term progress to address both water quality and hydrology in the central Everglades is needed to reverse ongoing degradation before it is too late.

=== Future of the Everglades ===
In 2008, the State of Florida agreed to buy U.S. Sugar and all of its manufacturing and production facilities for an estimated $1.7 billion. Florida officials indicated they intended to allow U.S. Sugar to process for six more years before dismissing its employees and dismantling the plant. The area, which includes 187,000 acres (760 km^{2}) of land, would then be rehabilitated and water flow from Lake Okeechobee would be restored. In November 2008, the agreement was revised to offer $1.34 billion, allowing sugar mills in Clewiston to remain in production. Critics of the revised plan say that it ensures sugarcane will be grown in the Everglades for at least another decade. Further research is being done to address the continuing production of sugarcane in the Everglades to minimize phosphorus runoff.

Everglades restoration received $96 million of the American Recovery and Reinvestment Act of 2009. As a result of the stimulus package, a mile-long (1.6 km) bridge to replace the Tamiami Trail, a road that borders Everglades National Park to the north and has blocked water from reaching the southern Everglades, was begun by the Army Corps of Engineers in December 2009. The next month work began to reconstruct the C-111 canal, east of the park that historically diverted water into Florida Bay. Governor Charlie Crist announced the same month that $50 million of state funds would be earmarked for Everglades restoration. In May 2010, 5.5 miles (8.9 km) of bridges were proposed to be added to the Tamiami Trail.

In March 2026, the Florida Senate and Houses each proposed bills to open the door to more housing in the Everglades. A broad collection of local political leaders oppose the bill.

== Plane crashes ==
At least three airplanes have crashed in the Everglades:

- Northwest Orient Airlines Flight 705, February 12, 1963, all 43 passengers and crew killed.
- On December 29, 1972, Eastern Air Lines Flight 401 crashed in the Florida Everglades, causing 101 fatalities and 75 survivors. The cause was pilot error.
- On May 11, 1996, ValuJet Flight 592 crashed in the Everglades killing all 110 passengers and crew. The cause was an in-flight cargo fire.

== See also ==
- Carr (landform)
- Everglades Foundation
- Everglades Pseudoatoll
- History of Florida
- Florida Wildlife Corridor
- Florida Fish and Wildlife Conservation Commission

== Bibliography ==
- Barnett, Cynthia (2007). Mirage: Florida and the Vanishing Water of the Eastern U.S., University of Michigan Press. ISBN 0-472-11563-4
- Carter, W. Hodding (2004). Stolen Water: Saving the Everglades from its Friends, Foes, and Florida, Atria Books. ISBN 0-7434-7407-4
- Caulfield, Patricia (1970) Everglades, Sierra Club / Ballantine Books. ISBN 0-345-02353-6
- Douglas, Marjory S. (1947). The Everglades: River of Grass. R. Bemis Publishing. ISBN 0-912451-44-0
- Douglas, Marjory; Rothchild, John (1987). Marjory Stoneman Douglas: Voice of the River. Pineapple Press. ISBN 0-910923-94-9
- Ferriter, Amy; Serbesoff-King, Kristina; Bodle, Mike; Goodyear, Carole; Doren, Bob; Langeland, Ken (2004). Chapter 8E: Exotic Species in the Everglades Protection Area, South Florida Water Management District
- George, Jean (1972). Everglades Wildguide. National Park Service. Gov. doc #I 29.62:Ev2
- Griffin, John (2002). Archeology of the Everglades. University Press of Florida. ISBN 0-8130-2558-3
- Grunwald, Michael (2006). The Swamp: The Everglades, Florida, and the Politics of Paradise. New York: Simon & Schuster. ISBN 0-7432-5107-5
- Hann, John (ed.) (1991). Missions to the Calusa. University Press of Florida. ISBN 0-8130-1966-4
- Jewell, Susan (1993). Exploring Wild South Florida: A Guide to Finding the Natural Areas and Wildlife of the Everglades and Florida Keys, Pineapple Press, Inc. ISBN 1-56164-023-9
- Lodge, Thomas E. (2005). The Everglades Handbook. Understanding the Ecosystem. CRC Press. ISBN 1-884015-06-9
- McCally, David (1999). The Everglades: An Environmental History. University Press of Florida. ISBN 0-8130-2302-5
- Ripple, Jeff (1992). Big Cypress Swamp and the Ten Thousand Islands: Eastern America's Last Great Wilderness, University of South Carolina Press. ISBN 0-87249-842-5
- Tebeau, Charlton (1968). Man in the Everglades: 2000 Years of Human History in the Everglades National Park. University of Miami Press.
- Toops, Connie (1998). The Florida Everglades. Voyageur Press. ISBN 0-89658-372-4
- U.S. Army Corps of Engineers and South Florida Water Management District (April 1999). "Summary", Central and Southern Florida Project Comprehensive Review Study.
- University of Florida Agricultural Experiment Station and United States Department of Agriculture Soil Conservation Service (March 1948). Bulletin 442: Soils, Geology, and Water Control in the Everglades Region.
- Whitney, Ellie et al., eds. (2004) Priceless Florida: Natural Ecosystems and Native Species. Pineapple Press, Inc. ISBN 978-1-56164-309-7
- Wilhelm, Chris, "Pragmatism, Seminoles, and Science: Opposition to Progressive Everglades Drainage". The Florida Historical Quarterly. 90 (Spring 2012), 426–52.
