= Central and Southern Florida Project =

The Central and Southern Florida Project is a regional water management system, operated and maintained by the South Florida Water Management District in South Florida, the Everglades, and Lake Okeechobee to protect residents and businesses from floods and droughts. The Central and Southern Florida Project is also the title of the corresponding law, passed by the U.S. Congress in 1948.

== Public Law ==
The text of the bill resides in Title II of the Rivers and Harbors Act of 1948, Pub. L. 80–858. Title II, titled Flood Control, may also be referred to as the Flood Control Act of 1948. Title II was codified as 33 U.S.C. §§ 710c, 701c-1.

=== Text of Project ===
The text of the language of the bill is:

CENTRAL AND SOUTHERN FLORIDA "The project for Caloosahatchee River and Lake Okeechobee drainage areas, Florida, authorized by the River and Harbor Act of July 3, 1930, as amended, is hereby modified and expanded to include the first phase of the comprehensive plan for flood control and other purposes in central and southern Florida as recommended by the Chief of Engineers in House Document Numbered 643, Eightieth Congress, subject to the conditions of local cooperation prescribed therein, and there is hereby authorized to be appropriated the sum of $16,300,000 for partial accomplishment of said plan."

== See also ==
- Comprehensive Everglades Restoration Plan
