= Wild coffee =

Wild coffee is a common name for several plants and may refer to:

- Coffea, genus of flowering plants
- Diospyros whyteana, tree native to Africa and cultivated as an ornamental
- Polyscias guilfoylei, shrub cultivated as an ornamental
- Psychotria, a genus related to Coffea with a broad tropical distribution
  - Psychotria nervosa, shrub native to Florida
- Triosteum perfoliatum, an herbaceous plant native to North America which has been used as a coffee substitute
