= DeLuca Preserve =

Protected area in Osceola County, Florida

Coordinates: 27.68°N 80.95°W

DeLuca Preserve is a 27,000-acre (110 km^{2}) protected area in Osceola County near Yeehaw Junction, Florida. It was donated to the University of Florida by the DeLuca family in 2020, while its conservation easement is held by Ducks Unlimited. The property is managed by the University of Florida's Institute of Food and Agricultural Sciences (IFAS) and is used for teaching and various research projects. Access to the preserve is by appointment.

On the preserve property, cattle and citrus are raised, and it also includes flatwood forest, Florida scrub, and swamp. Wildlife species on the property include the highly endangered Florida grasshopper sparrow, the Florida panther, the gopher tortoise, and the red-cockaded woodpecker. DeLuca Preserve is directly bordered on the south by Kissimmee Prairie Preserve State Park, and the Three Lakes Wildlife Management Area is also nearby.

The Florida Wildflower Foundation planned an outing in the preserve for October 2023.

== History ==
The property that later became DeLuca Preserve had originally been acquired in 2005 by Subway co-founder and president Fred DeLuca for a large-scale "eco-sustainable" urban development project that had been given the name Destiny. The project faced delays due to opposition from environmentalists and Florida state agencies concerned about urban sprawl, and in addition DeLuca's relationship with his business partners in the project deteriorated, leading to lawsuits and the project's eventual failure.

After Fred DeLuca's death in 2015, his widow Elisabeth, who had reportedly "fallen in love with the property", decided to donate it in order to ensure its continued preservation in its undeveloped state.
