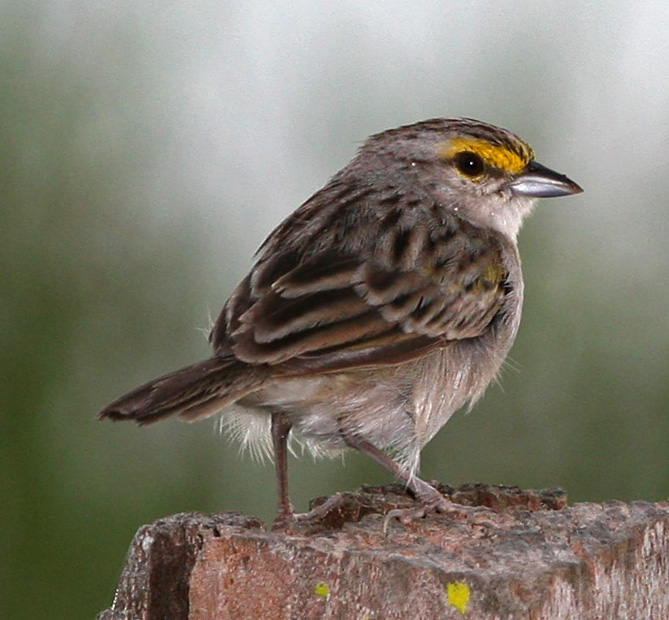
- Adult, Los Llanos, Venezuela

Conservation status
- Least Concern (IUCN 3.1)

Scientific classification
- Kingdom: Animalia
- Phylum: Chordata
- Class: Aves
- Order: Passeriformes
- Family: Passerellidae
- Genus: Ammodramus
- Species: A. aurifrons

Binomial name
- Ammodramus aurifrons (Spix, 1825)

Synonyms
- Myospiza aurifrons

= Yellow-browed sparrow =

Species of bird

Song of Yellow-browed sparrow

The yellow-browed sparrow (Ammodramus aurifrons) is a species of bird in the family Passerellidae. First described by Johann Baptist von Spix in 1825, this American sparrow is found across much of the Amazon basin in South America. Its natural habitats are subtropical or tropical moist shrubland, pastureland, and heavily degraded former forest.

== Taxonomy ==
When Johann Baptist von Spix first described the yellow-browed sparrow in 1825, he put it in the now-defunct genus Tanagra, believing it to be a tanager. The classification error was soon recognized, and the species was moved first to the genus Ammodramus, then to Myospiza—a genus Robert Ridgway created in 1898 for this and the closely related grassland sparrow. Most taxonomists now subsume Myospiza into Ammodramus. DNA analysis indicates that the yellow-browed sparrow is a sister species to the grassland sparrow, and that these two species make a sister group with the grasshopper sparrow; these three are genetically distinct from the other Ammodramus sparrows. The yellow-browed sparrow has four subspecies, which differ primarily in the extent of yellow on the face and the amount of streaking on the upperparts and crown:

- A. a. apurensis, first described by William Henry Phelps and Ernest Thomas Gilliard in 1941, is found in northeastern Colombia.
- A. a. cherriei, first described by Frank Chapman in 1914, is found in central Colombia.
- A. a. tenebrosus, first described by John Todd Zimmer and Phelps in 1949, ranges from southeastern Colombia through southwestern Venezuela into the adjacent areas of Brazil.
- A. a. aurifrons, described by Spix in 1825, ranges south from southeastern Colombia into central Bolivia and east along the Amazon basin to the Atlantic coast.

The yellow-browed sparrow is one of nine sparrows in the genus Ammodramus, a name which means "desert runner" or "desert racer" (from the Greek ammos, meaning "desert" and -dromos, meaning "-racer" or "-runner"). The species name aurifrons is a combination of the Latin words auri, meaning "gold" and frons, meaning "forehead" or "front".

== Description ==
The yellow-browed sparrow is a small American sparrow, measuring 13 cm (5 in) in length, with a mass between 14.5 and 19 g (0.5 and 0.7 oz). Sexes are similarly plumaged, though males average very slightly larger than females. The adult is brownish gray on the upperparts, with dusky streaks on the back. Its underparts are whitish, shading to grayish on the chest and buff on the flanks. Its legs are pinkish-brown, while the beak is horn-colored, with a darker culmen. Its iris is reddish brown. The juvenile, which has no yellow on its face or wings, is buffier than adults are, with thin brownish streaks on its breast and flanks.

=== Similar species ===
Although quite similar to the grassland sparrow, the yellow-browed sparrow typically shows more yellow on its face. It is overall paler and less streaked than the grassland sparrow, and lacks chestnut edges to its flight feathers. It is best told by its buzzy song, its less secretive behavior and less restrictive habitat preferences.

== Habitat and range ==
Although its former habitat was largely along rivers and on islands, the yellow-browed sparrow is now widespread in grassy areas of the Amazon biome, including agricultural fields, roadsides and around towns. It is generally found in the lowlands, though it has been recorded to 1,000 m (3,281 ft) on the east side of the Andes, and regularly as high as 1,500 m (4,921 ft) — and sometimes to 2,000 m (6,562 ft) — in Ecuador.

== Behavior ==
The yellow-browed sparrow is generally easier to see than its sister species is. It is less secretive, and is found in a wider range of grasslands.

=== Food and feeding ===
Like most American sparrows, the yellow-browed sparrow is largely granivorous, feeding on the seeds of native grasses and various introduced plants. It also eats insects, including larvae. It typically feeds on the ground.

=== Breeding ===
Breeding has been recorded between February and September. The yellow-browed sparrow builds a cup nest of dried grass lined with fine plant material. The nest is generally on the ground in a grass clump, though sometimes it is placed low in a shrub. The female lays 2–3 white eggs.

=== Voice ===
The yellow-browed sparrow's high-pitched song is described as "insect-like". Monotonous and buzzy, it is transcribed as tic, tzzz-tzzzzz, with the first note weak and short. The male sings throughout the day from a low, exposed perch.

== Conservation and threats ==
Because of its very large range and apparently stable population, the yellow-browed sparrow has been designated by the International Union for Conservation of Nature (IUCN) as a species of least concern. It is described as common throughout its range, though its numbers have not been quantified. This species has benefited from the clearing of rainforest for agriculture and cattle ranching; it is common in early successional fields.
