= Florida dry prairie =

Ecological zone in Florida, United States

Florida Dry Prairie
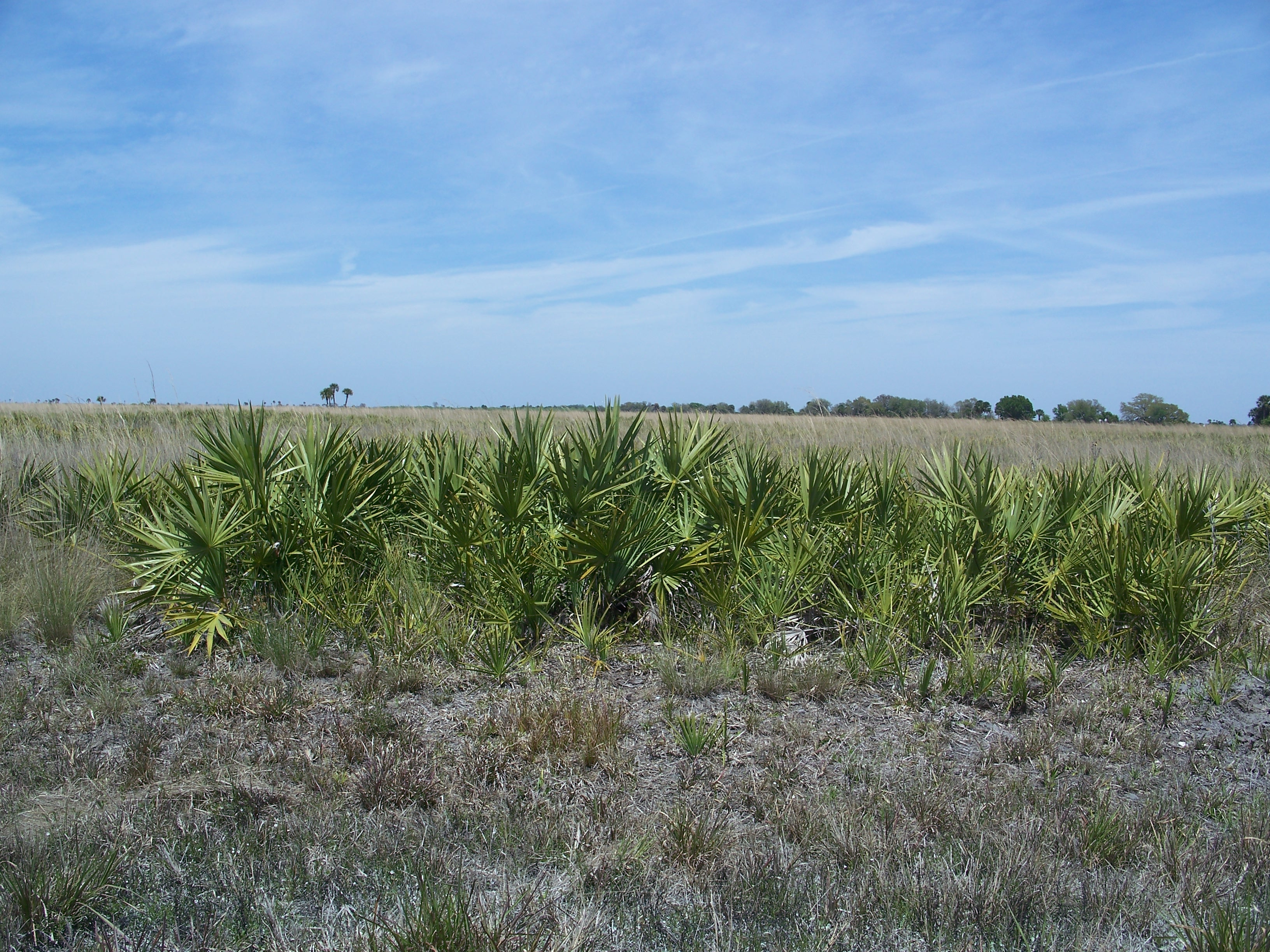
- Kissimmee River Prairie

Ecology
- Realm: Nearctic; Neotropics
- Biome: Grassland

Geography
- Country: United States
- State: Florida
- Elevation: 35 to 65 Ft (10.7 to 20 Meters)
- Climate type: Subtropic

Conservation
- Habitat loss: 90%
- Protected: 5%

The Florida dry prairie is a herbaceous upland plant community found in subtropical southern Florida. It consists of plains covered in grasses, low shrubs, and few widely scattered trees. It was originally found on the plains near the Kissimmee River and Fisheating Creek connected to Lake Okeechobee, but conversion to agriculture and pasture have reduced its range. Frequent fires are necessary to maintain this system.

== Geographic range ==
Dry prairie was once the dominant grassland endemic to central Florida, from the western shore of Lake Okeechobee and extending northeast into Osceola County. Historically, it is thought that Florida's dry prairie covered approximately 1,931 square miles. Pre-settlement dry prairie could be separated into three regions: the "Kissimmee River Prairie", "the Big Prairie" across central Florida, and the "Myakka Prairie". These three regions are not geographically isolated. Parts of the dry prairie are protected in the Kissimmee Prairie Preserve State Park and in the Myakka River State Park.

== Geographic Features ==
The area within and surrounding the dry continuous dry prairie's area is not a uniform biome. Areas of flatwoods within the prairie contain sparse pine cover, separating sections of the dry prairie. The pines do not spread farther into the prairie due to a lack of drainage. The lack of drainage causes more frequent flooding compared to the flatwood communities, and when combined with regular burning, prevents pine seedlings from settling. Other features within the dry prairie are sections of scrubby flatwoods, an intermediate between scrub and flatwood, depression marshes, and grassy wet prairies that transition to nearby marshes and swamps.

Pre-settlement dry prairie had borders with pinelands, floodplain marshes, and shallow marshes. The northern areas of dry prairie blend with the shallow zones of lakeshore floodplain marshes from Lake Tohopekaliga, Cypress Lake, Lake Hatchineha, and Lake Kissimmee.

== Flora and fauna ==
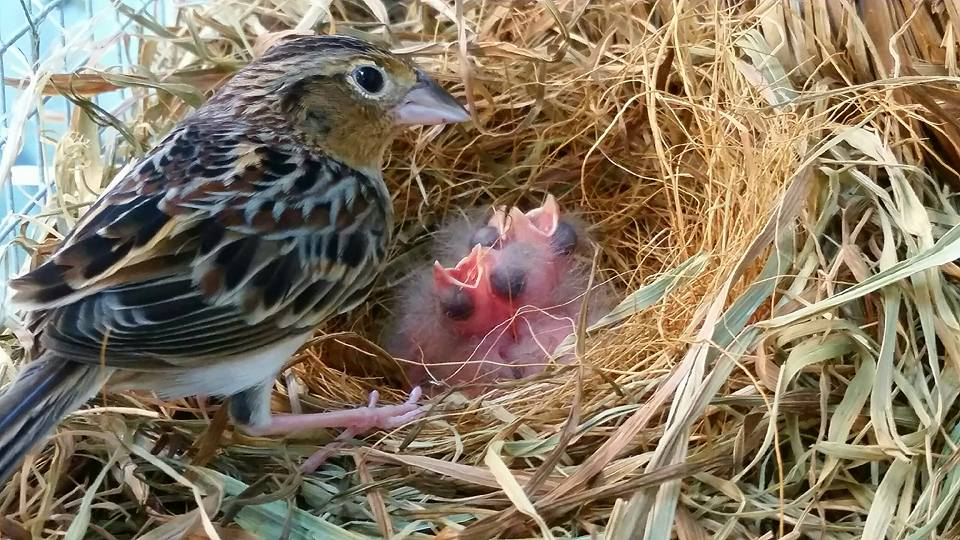
Florida grasshopper sparrow

There are 658 known vascular flora species, 115 families, and 317 genera found in Florida's dry prairie, with 94% of species native to central Florida. There are no plants known to be endemic to the dry prairie environment, but there are a number of species endemic to the Florida peninsula. The shrub layer is dominated by saw palmetto (Serenoa repens).

Occasional trees include slash pine (Pinus elliottii) and cabbage palm (Sabal palmetto). Wiregrass (Aristidia beyrichiana), toothache grass (Ctenium aromaticum), and beak rush (Rhynchospora spp.) are dominant grasses and sedges. Where slash pine is more abundant, this system grades into south Florida pine flatwoods.

There are a number of species that are listed as "at-risk" that can be found in the Florida dry prairie. The Florida grasshopper sparrow (Ammodramus savannarum floridanus), sandhill crane (Antigone canadensis pratensis), Florida burrowing owl (Athene cunicularia floridana), and the Florida panther (Puma concolor couguar) are a few that are at risk, with the grasshopper sparrow and panther listed as "endangered" according to the U.S. Endangered Species Act.

== Human influence ==
=== Agriculture ===
The increased settlement and growing population of Florida in the early 20th century came with expanded agriculture and the conversion of dry prairie to farmland. Extensive dairy and citrus farms have very little dry prairie vegetation and result in landscape fragmentation, subsequently reducing habitat for dry prairie wildlife. There may also exist a correlation between wetland development and encroachment of the pineland/prairie border. Pastures and sod farms use grasses foreign to the prairie such as American Jointvetch (Aeshynomene americanus). This changes the natural vegetation of occupied land, increasing grass coverage and decreasing shrub cover, bare ground, and vegetation height.

=== Fire suppression ===
Historically, this system experienced fire intervals of 1–4 years, allowing fire-adapting vegetation to grow and maintaining the treeless landscape. Many vegetative species are found in greater abundance at sites with frequent fire . As the settlement of Florida expanded, fire suppression became common practice to prevent damage to homes and agriculture. Because the dry prairie system requires fire for maintenance, suppression has reduced the geographic coverage of this system. With regular prescribed burning, a resurgence in dry prairie vegetation and wildlife can be seen. The prescribed burnings can be used to maintain the lack of trees in the dry prairie. When the burning are coordinated to be done during the transition between the dry spring and wet summer, it creates an environment not suitable for pines to grow. Controlled fires done earlier in the dry spring favor smaller vegetation such as toothache grass (Ctenium aromaticum).
