= Kissimmee Prairie Preserve State Park =

Protected area in Florida

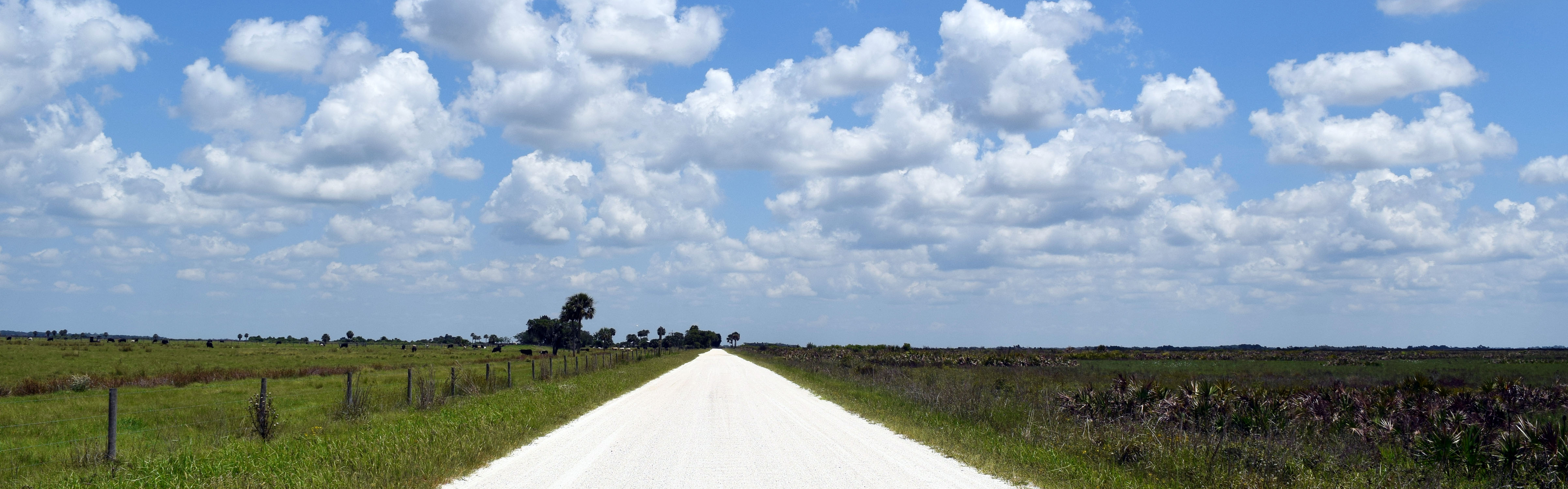
- Peavine Road

- Location within Florida Location within the United States
- Interactive map of Kissimmee Prairie Preserve State Park
- Location: Okeechobee County, Florida, USA
- Nearest city: Okeechobee, Florida
- Coordinates: 27°35′35″N 81°04′10″W
- Governing body: Florida Department of Environmental Protection
- Website: Official website

Kissimmee Prairie Preserve State Park is a Florida state park, located approximately 40 km (25 mi) north of Okeechobee, off US 441. The preserve protects the largest remaining tract of Florida dry prairie, an ecosystem shaped by cycles of flooding and fire. The preserve lies adjacent to the Kissimmee River, an important headwater of the Everglades, the watershed of which the park lies within.

Many rare, threatened, and endangered species inhabit the area, and the wide-open prairie landscape provides opportunities for birdwatchers and photographers. Three species found within the park of particular interest to birders include the Florida grasshopper sparrow, Audubon's caracara, and Florida burrowing owl.

Thanks to its location in one of the darkest portions of the state, the night sky above the park measures in at a Bortle 3, allowing for viewing of the Milky Way and several Messier objects. The park is a certified International Dark Sky Site by DarkSky International, the first place within the state of Florida to receive such a designation.

The park address is 33104 N.W. 192nd Ave Okeechobee, FL 34972. The visitor center is located 5 miles down the main road from the park gate.

== Recreational activities ==
Activities include picnicking, hiking, camping, wildlife viewing, and stargazing. The park campground consists of 35 combo RV/Tent sites, 4 dedicated tent sides, 3 primitive tent sites, and 5 glamping sites. The campground also has several horse paddocks, a number of horse trails, and a dedicated astronomy pad.

== Hours ==
The Kissimmee Prairie Preserve State Park opens at 8 a.m. and closes at sundown, while the visitor center is open between 9 a.m. and 4 p.m.

== Gallery ==
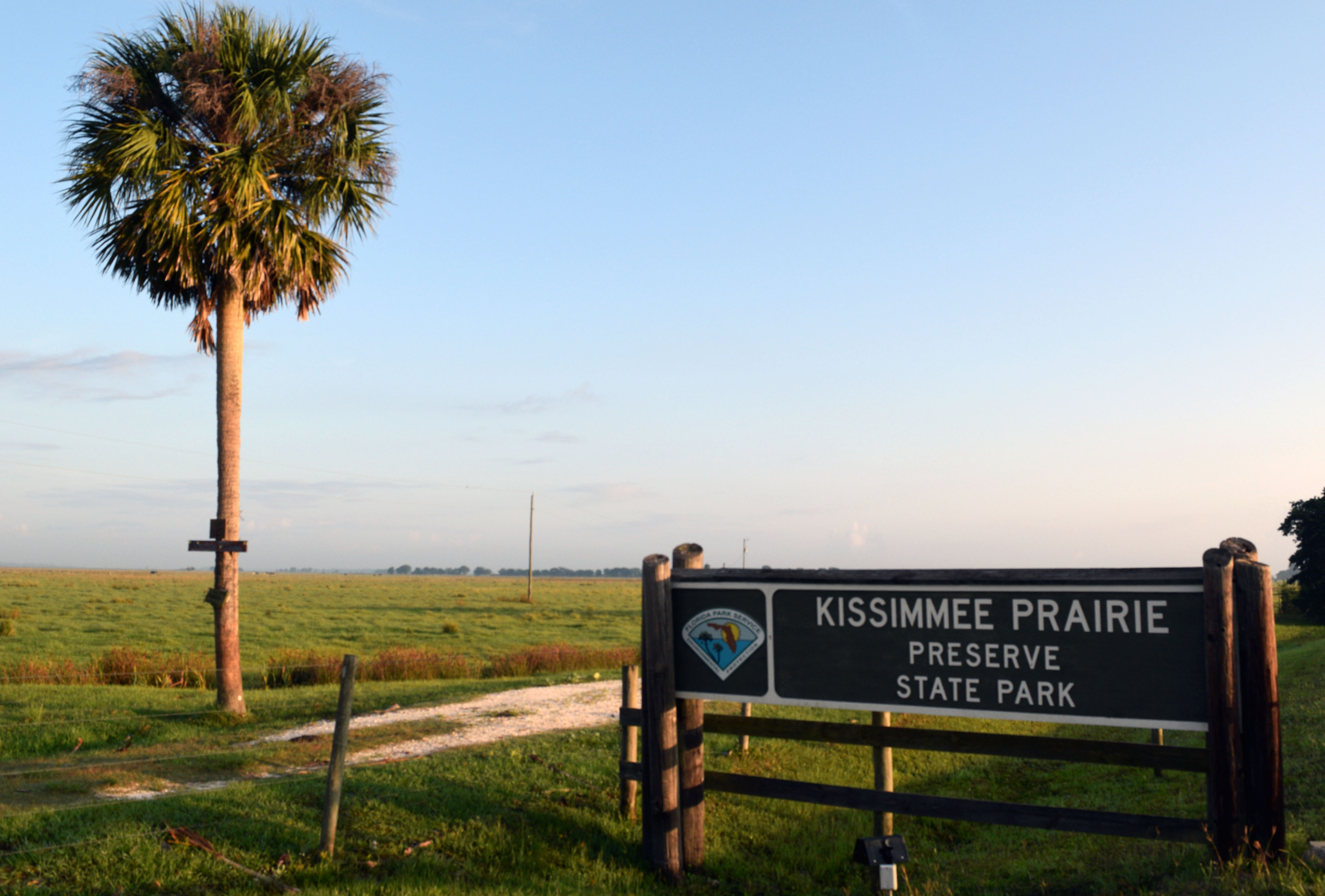
Entrance sign

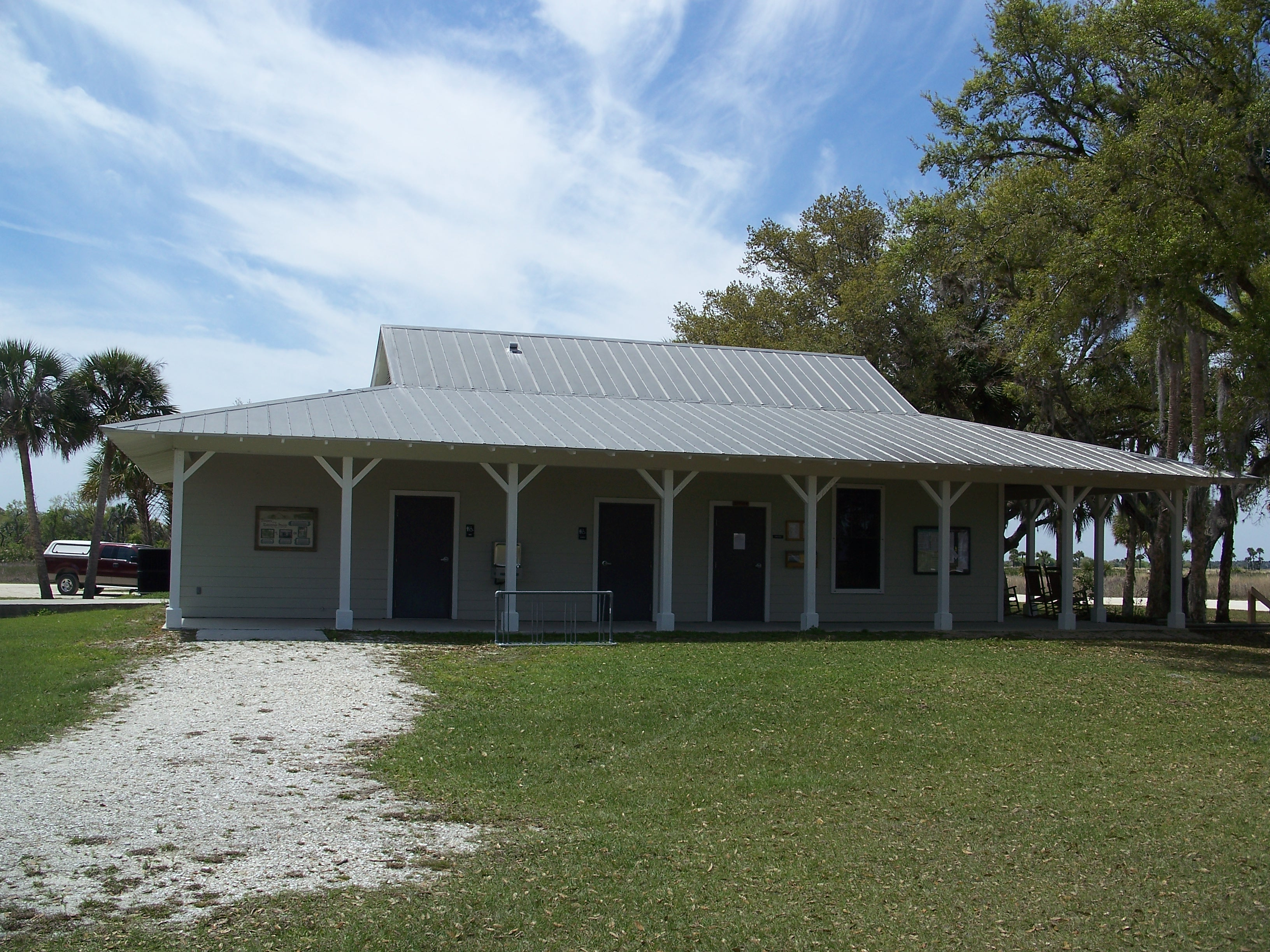
Visitor center

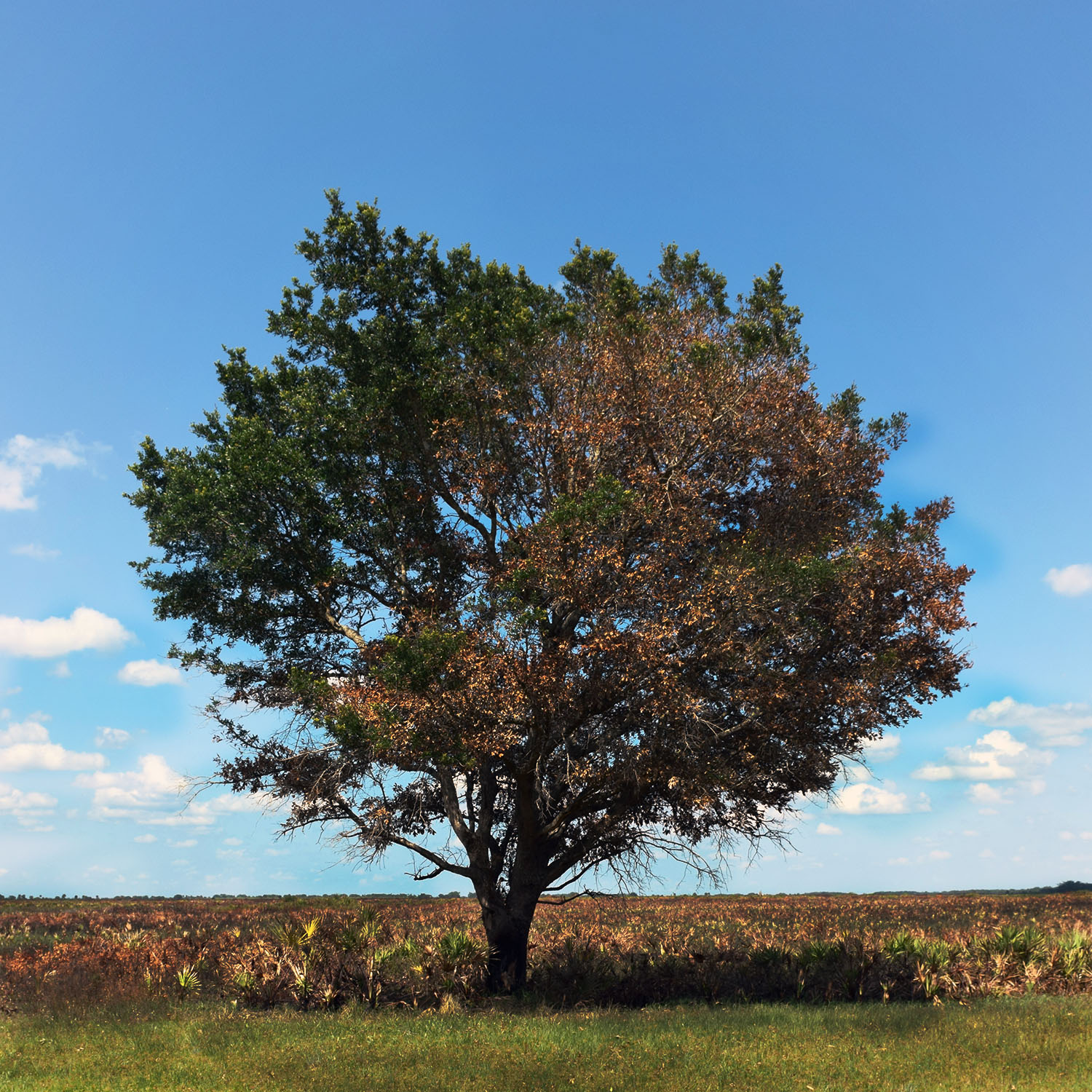
Oak

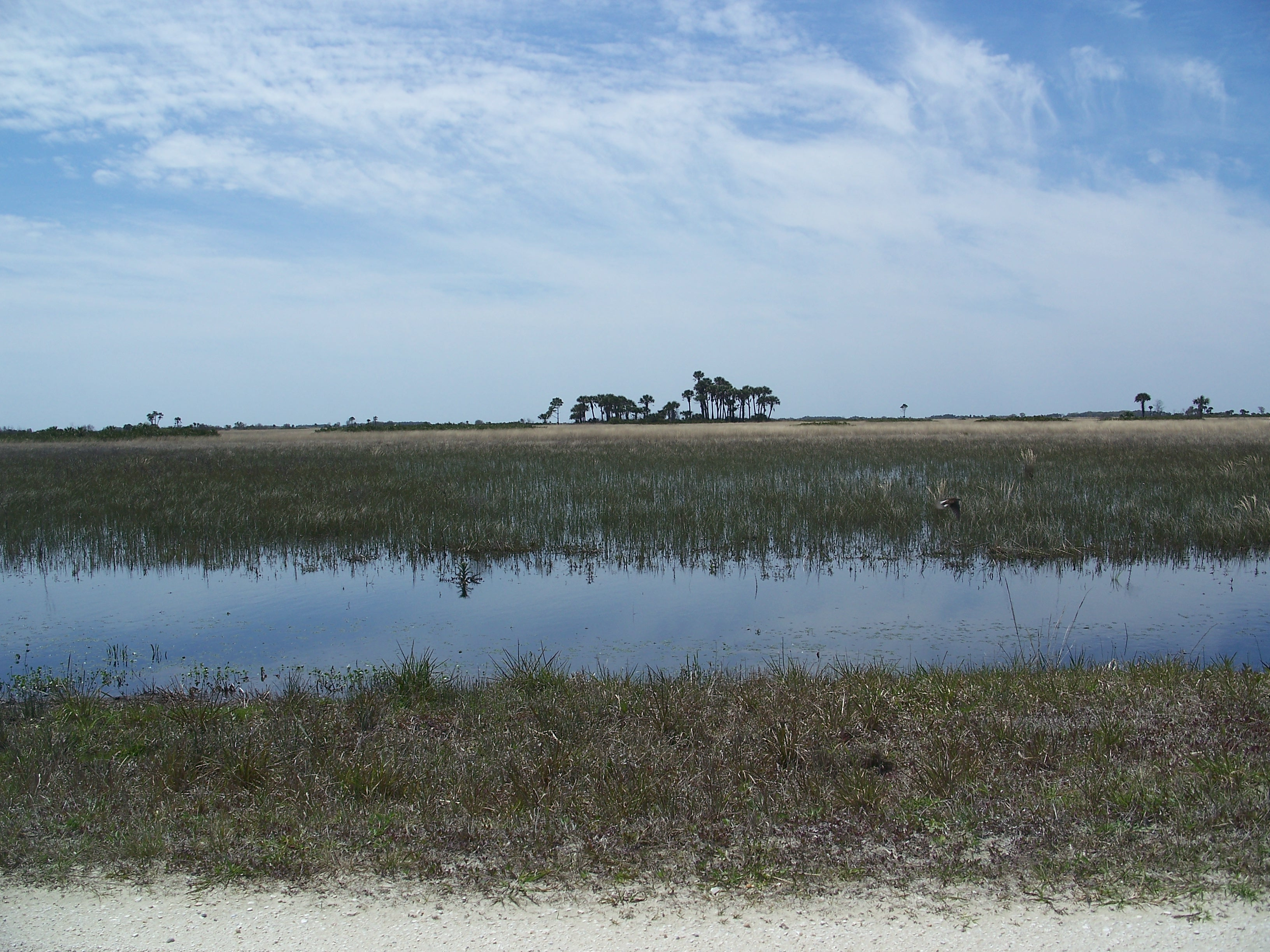
Prairie after the rain

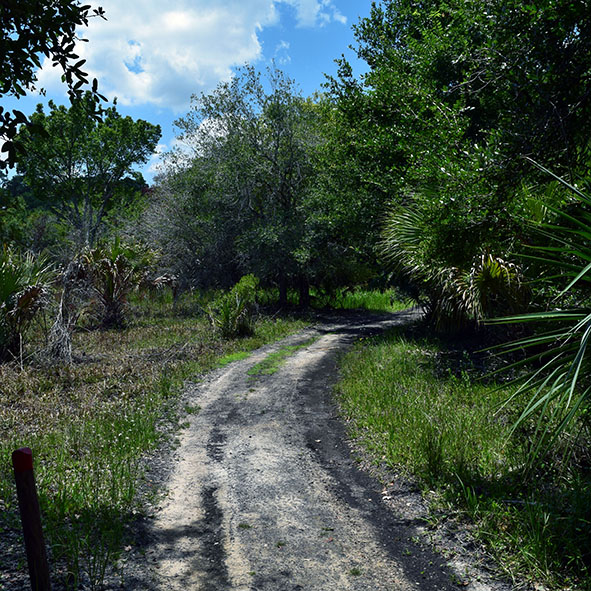
Kilpatrick Hammock Trail

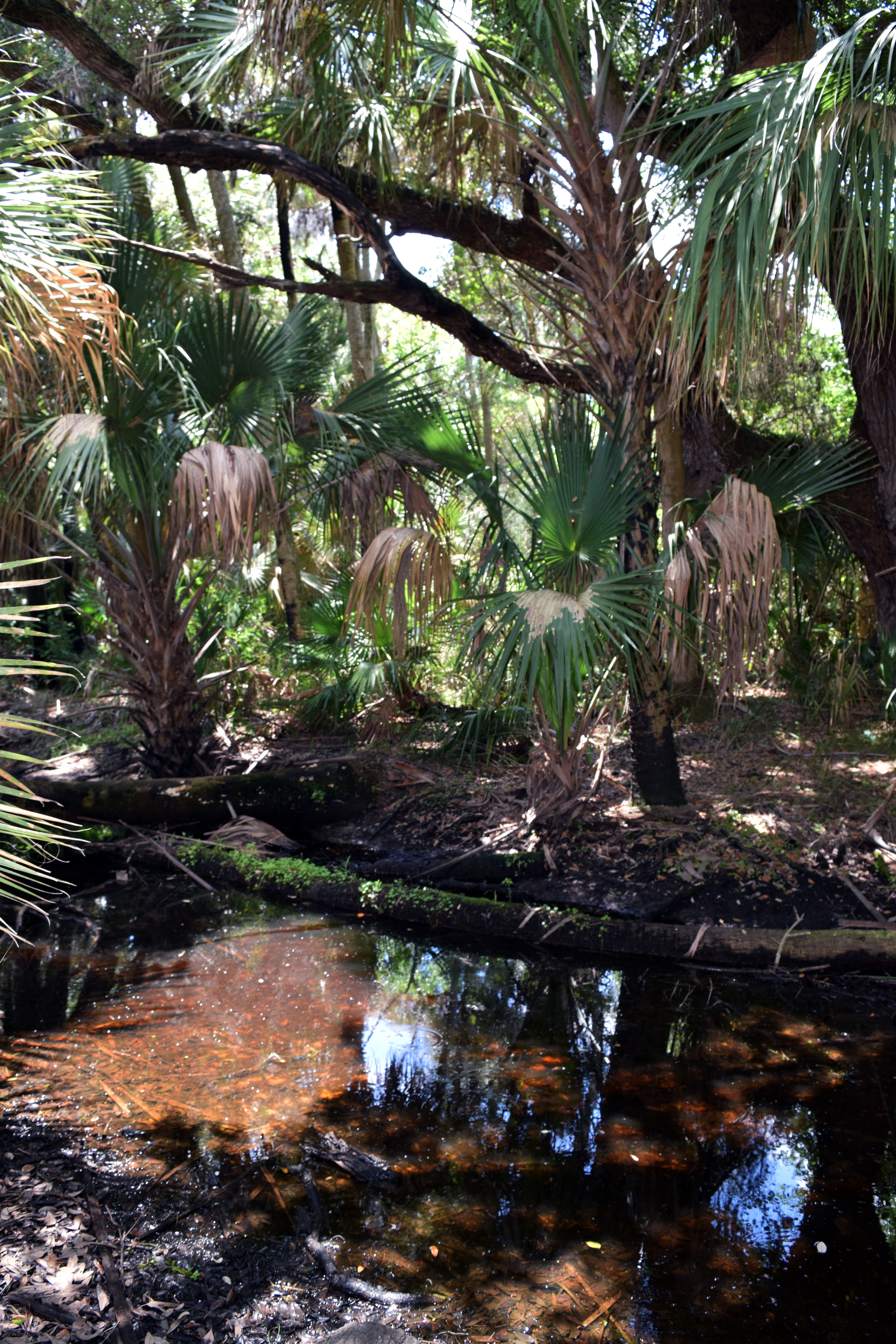
Palms near pond in Kilpatrick Hammock

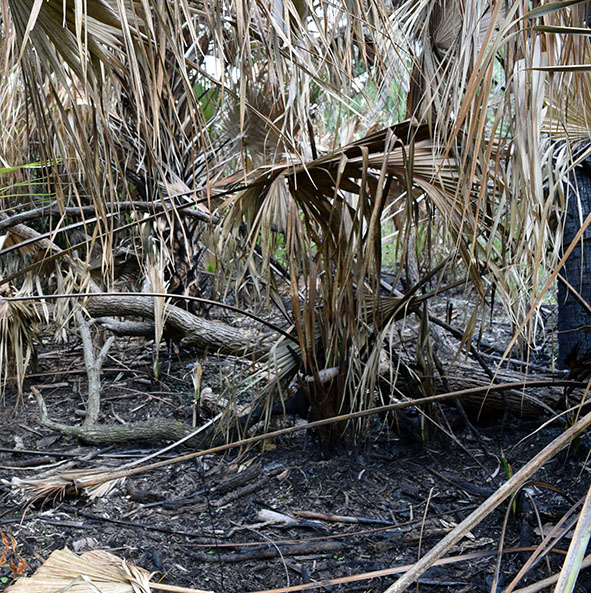
Effects of controlled burn, Kilpatrick Hammock

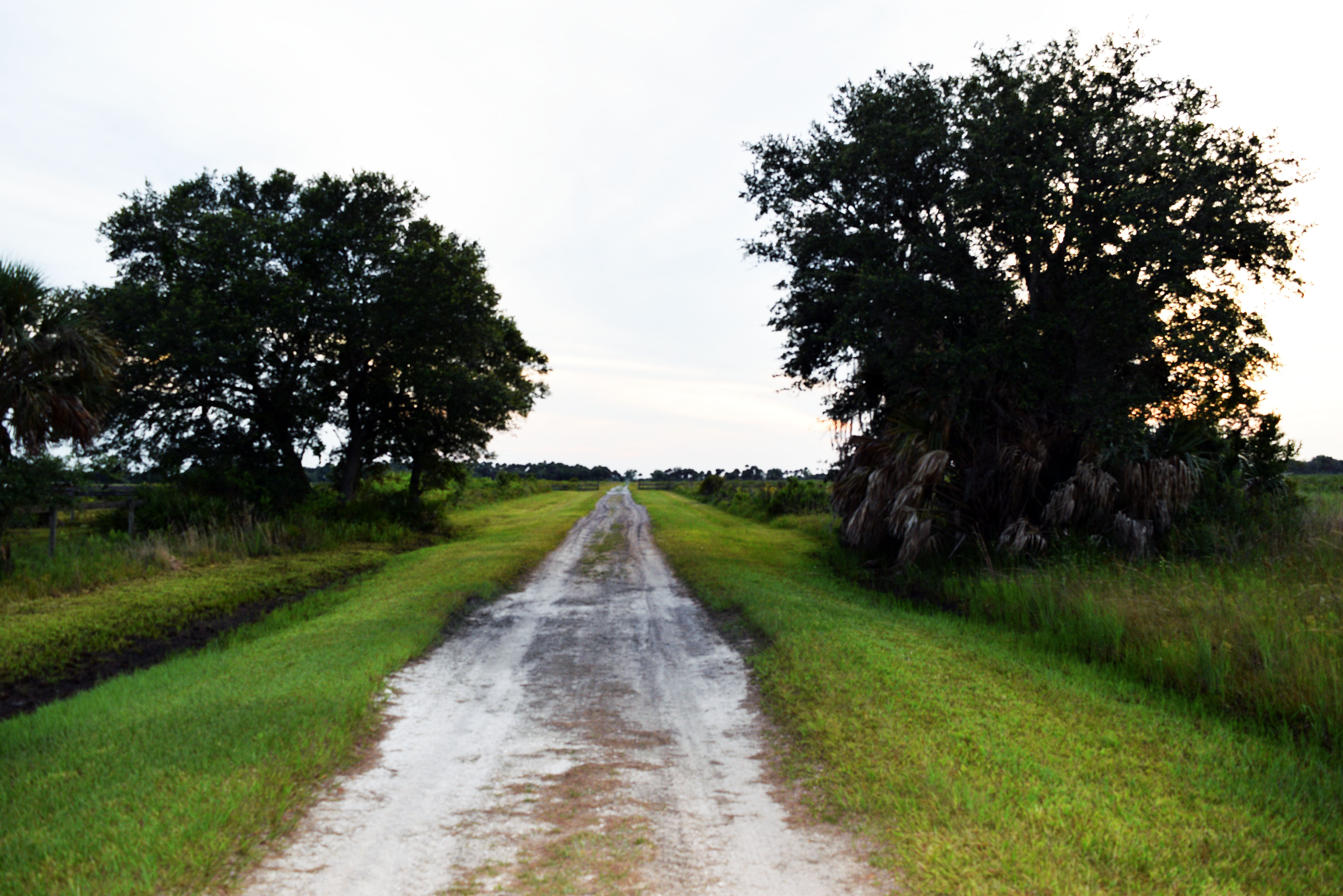
Military Trail (hiking)

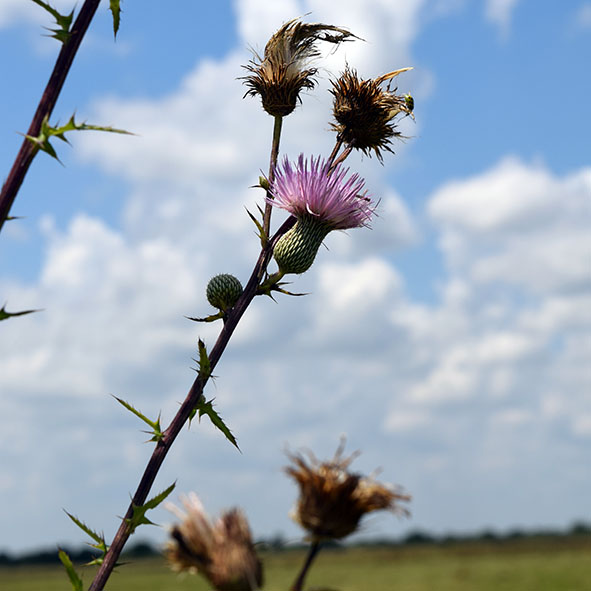
Nuttall's thistle

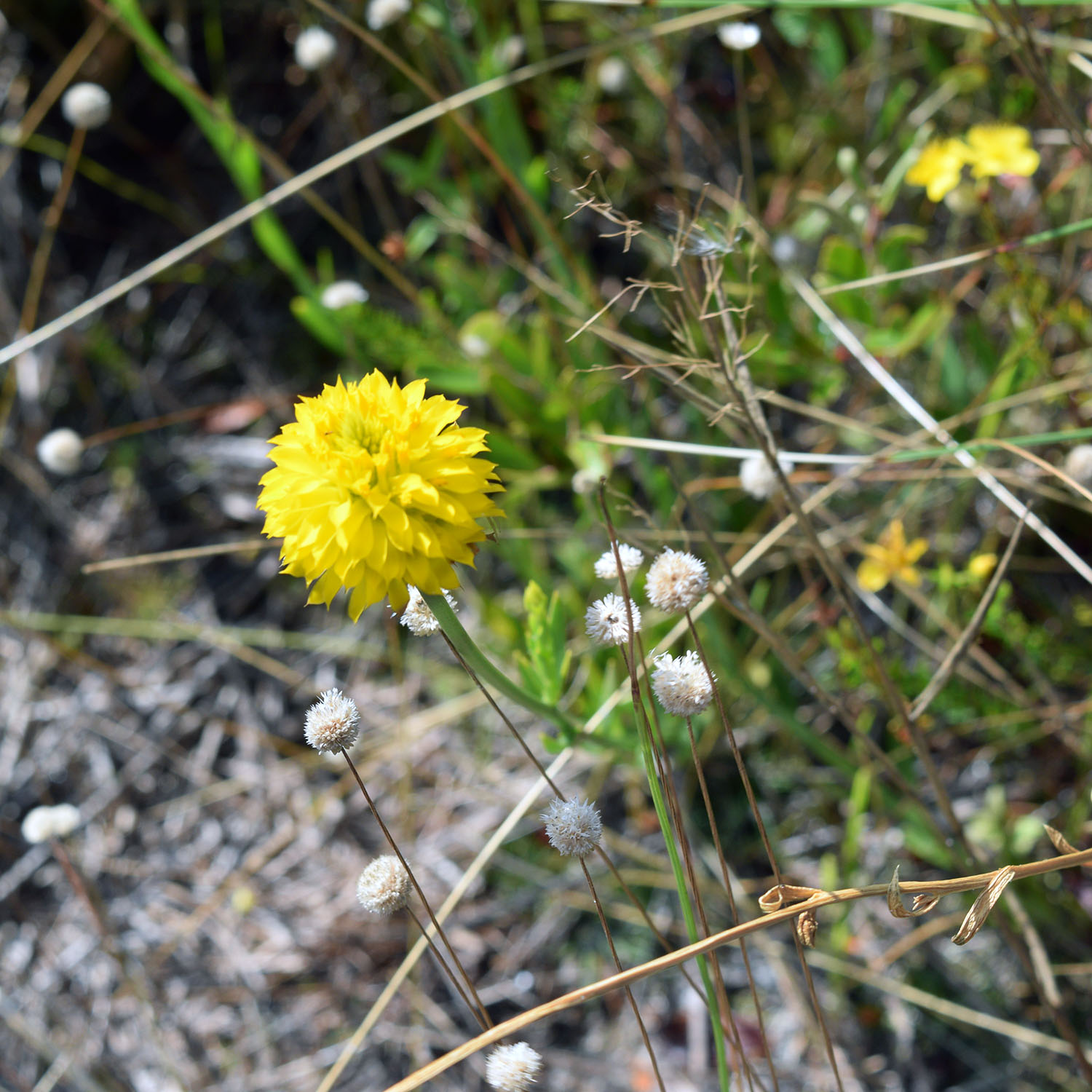
Yellow milkwort

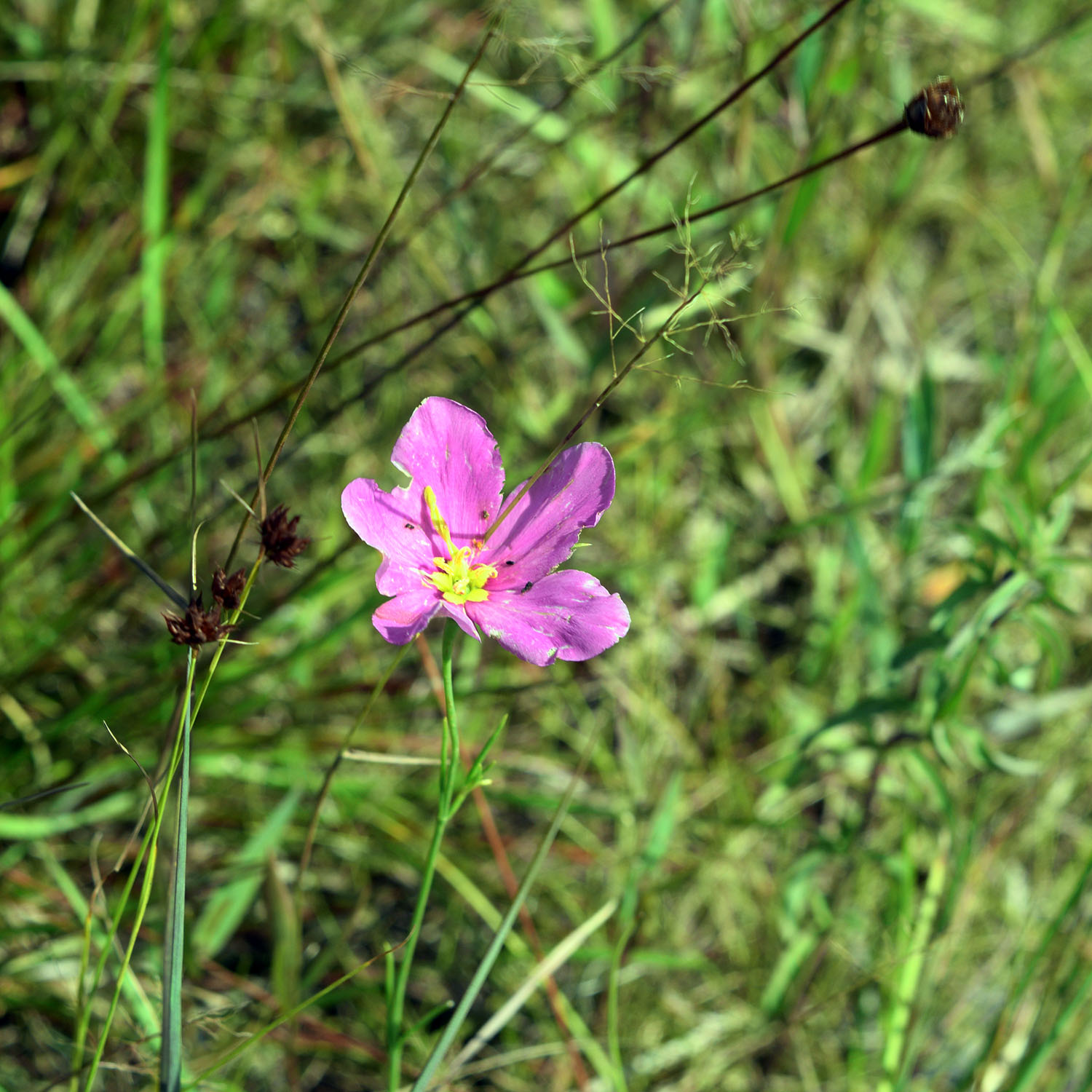
Marsh-pink

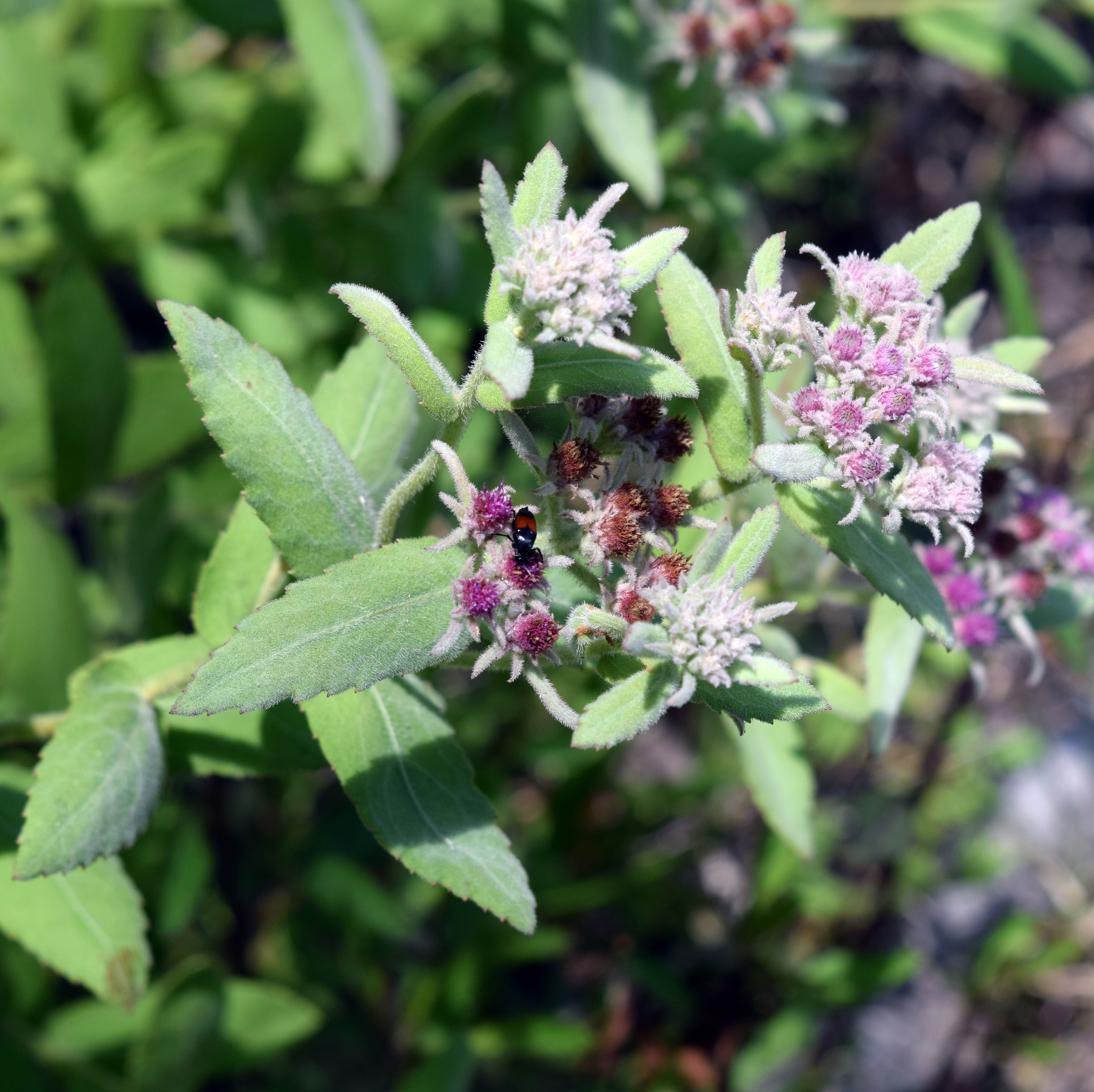
Wildflower and insect
