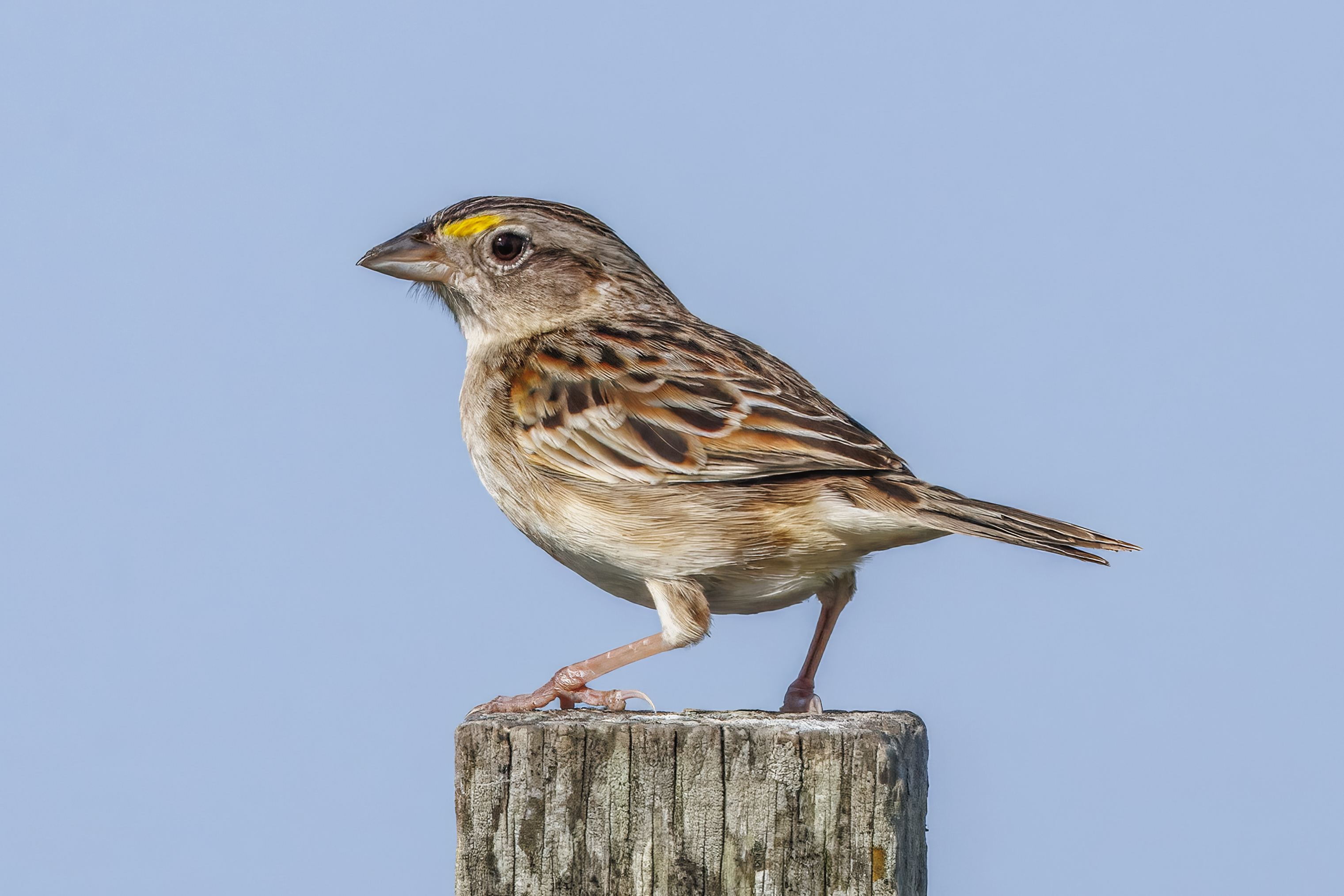
- In Colonia, Uruguay

Conservation status
- Least Concern (IUCN 3.1)

Scientific classification
- Kingdom: Animalia
- Phylum: Chordata
- Class: Aves
- Order: Passeriformes
- Family: Passerellidae
- Genus: Ammodramus
- Species: A. humeralis

Binomial name
- Ammodramus humeralis (Bosc, 1792)

Synonyms
- Tanagra humeralis (protonym); Myospiza humeralis

= Grassland sparrow =

Species of bird

The grassland sparrow (Ammodramus humeralis) is a species of bird in the family Passerellidae. It is found in Argentina, Bolivia, Brazil, Colombia, French Guiana, Guyana, Paraguay, Peru, Suriname, Uruguay, and Venezuela. Its natural habitats are dry savannah, subtropical or tropical seasonally wet or flooded lowland grassland, and pastureland.

== Description ==
The grassland sparrow is a robust species with a large head and a short tail, with a total length of about 13 cm (5 in). The wings are short and the legs fairly long. The upper parts are brownish-grey streaked with black. The breast and flanks are greyish-buff or pinkish-buff and the underparts are dull white. There is a narrow white eye-ring, and a spot of yellow on the lores and another on the bend of the wing. The song is a high-pitched but thin series of plaintive phrases, "eee, telee, teeeee". This bird is similar in appearance to the yellow-browed sparrow, but that has more yellow on the face and the voice is quite distinct.

== Distribution and habitat ==
This sparrow is native to the western half of South America. Its range includes Argentina, Bolivia, Brazil, Colombia, French Guiana, Guyana, Paraguay, Peru, Suriname, Uruguay and Venezuela. Its typical habitat is tall savannah grassland, but it also inhabits pastureland and cerrado. It is present in lowland areas and at altitudes of up to 1,100 m (3,600 ft), possibly higher in southern Venezuela.

== Behavior ==
A "secretive" bird, this species feeds on the ground and flits away into the vegetation if disturbed. It can be observed when singing from an elevated perch, and feeds out in the open in the early morning and late evening. The diet consists of grass and other seeds, and small insects are also eaten, particularly during the breeding season. The nest is cup-shaped and built on the ground, with a runway through the foliage leading to it.

== Conservation status ==
The grassland sparrow is a common bird and has a very extensive range. No particular threats to this bird are known and the International Union for Conservation of Nature has assessed its conservation status as being of "least concern".
