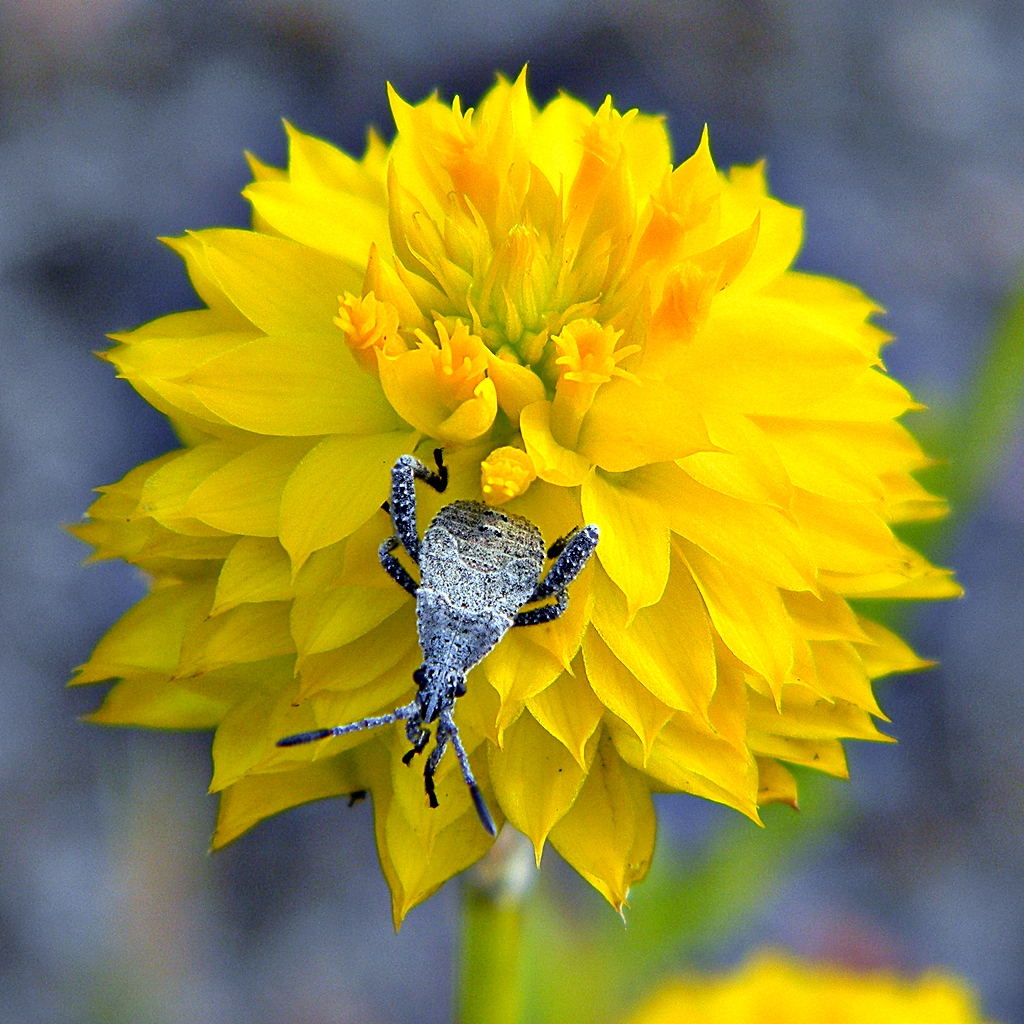

Conservation status
- Apparently Secure (NatureServe)

Scientific classification
- Kingdom: Plantae
- Clade: Embryophytes
- Clade: Tracheophytes
- Clade: Spermatophytes
- Clade: Angiosperms
- Clade: Eudicots
- Clade: Rosids
- Order: Fabales
- Family: Polygalaceae
- Genus: Senega
- Species: S. rugelii

Binomial name
- Senega rugelii (Shuttlew. ex Chapm.) J.F.B.Pastore & J.R.Abbott

Synonyms
- Pilostaxis rugelii (Shuttlew. ex A.Gray) Small; Polygala rugelii Shuttlw. ex Chapm.; Polygala reynoldsiae Chapm.

= Senega rugelii =

Species of flowering plant

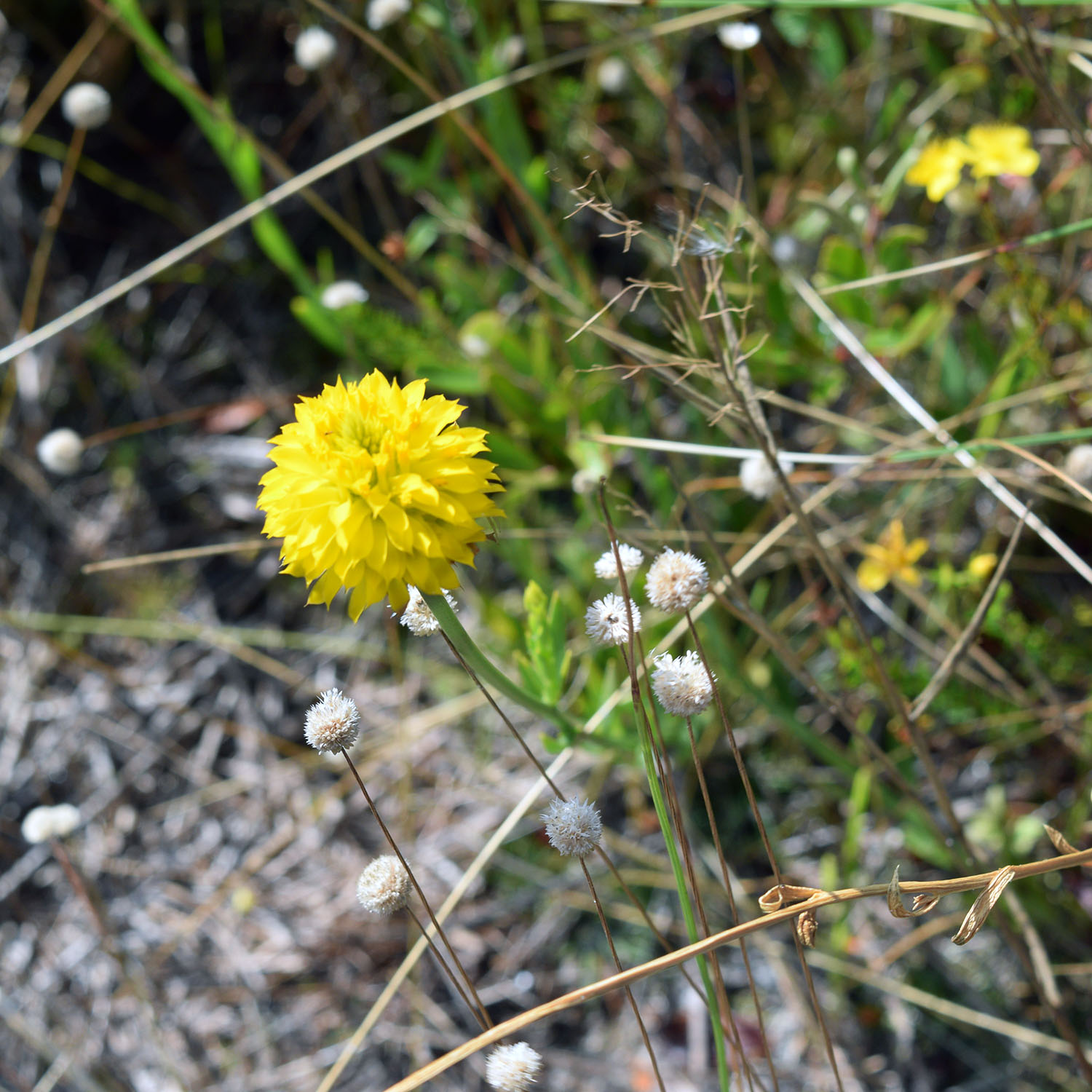
At Kissimmee Prairie Preserve State Park

Senega rugelii, commonly known as yellow milkwort, is a species of flowering plant in the milkwort family (Polygalaceae). It grows in Florida. An annual it grows up to 30 inches tall and has yellow flowers.

It occurs in habitats such as cypress bays, flatwood marshes, and has been observed growing in disturbed areas.
