= Three Lakes Wildlife Management Area =

Protected area in Florida, United States

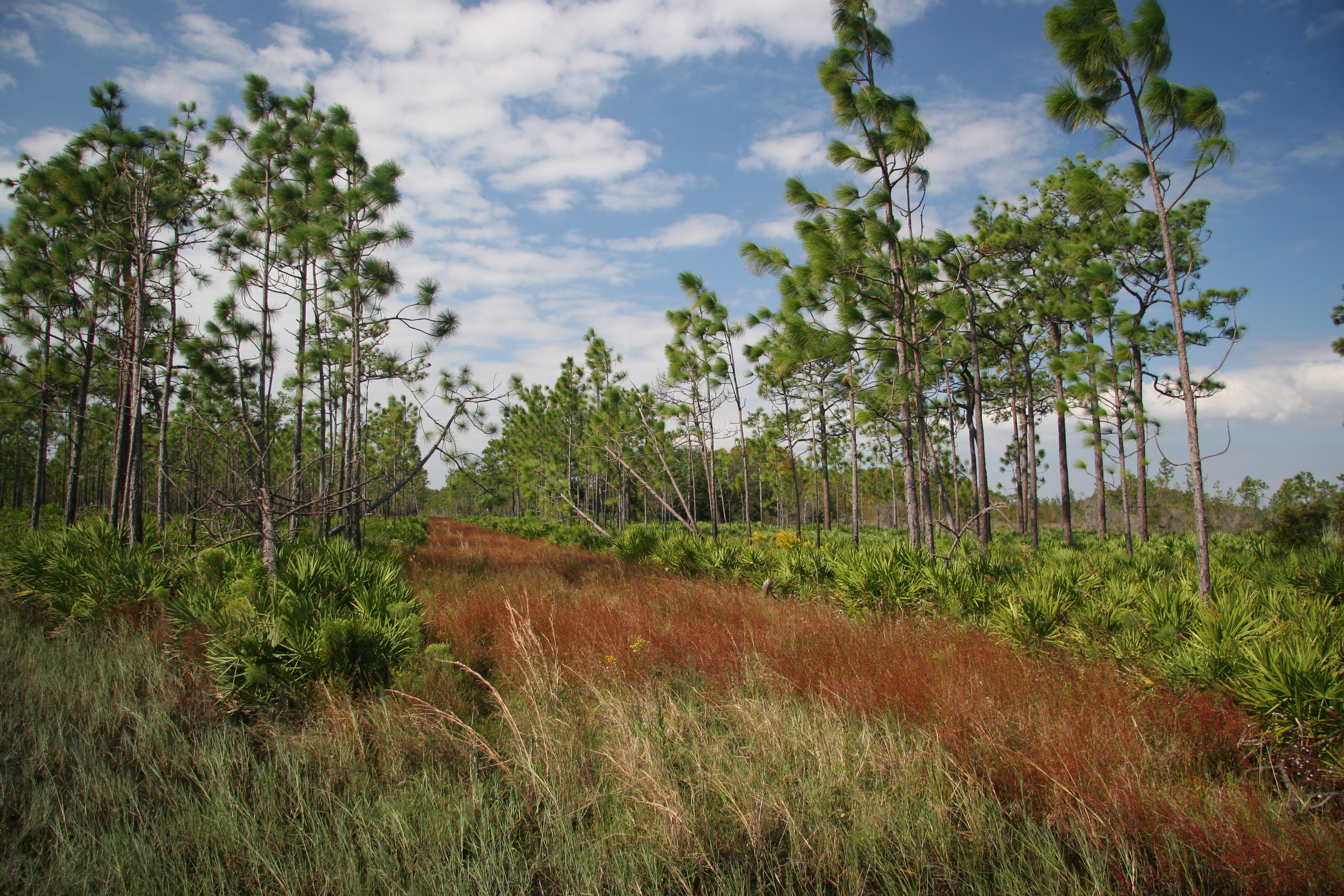
- Three Lakes WMA in October 2005.

- Location within Florida
- Location: Osceola County, Florida, Florida
- Coordinates: 27°56′16″N 81°07′27″W
- Area: 62,000 acres (25,000 ha)
- Governing body: Florida Fish and Wildlife Conservation Commission

The Three Lakes Wildlife Management Area (not to be confused with Three Lakes near Miami) is the second largest remaining expanse of dry prairie in the United States. It is located approximately 70 miles (110 km) south of the Kissimmee - Disney World area of Central Florida.

The management area is situated near Lake Kissimmee, Lake Jackson and Lake Marian. It comprises 62,000 acres (25,000 ha) including parts of the Kissimmee Prairie. The area is open for recreational uses including hunting, fishing, hiking, and birding.

The area's wildlife includes deer, bobcat, mottled duck, and wild turkey. The management area is also a year-round habitat for the bald eagle.
