= Lake Kissimmee =

Lake in Florida, US

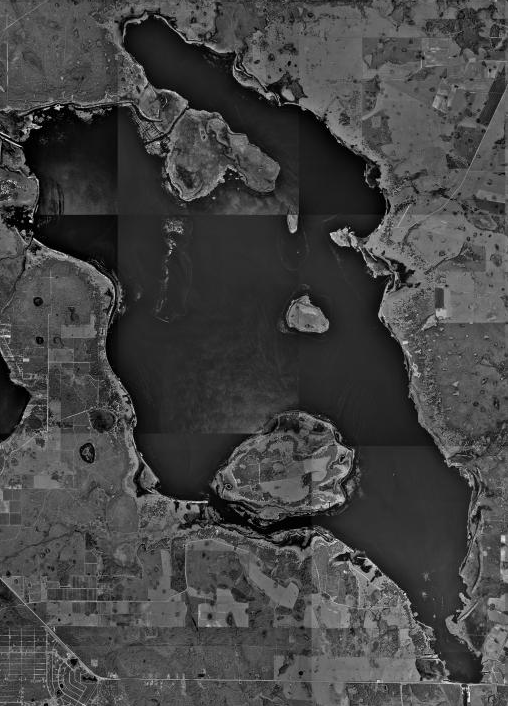

- Location within Florida Location within the United States
- Location: Osceola County, Florida, Polk County, Florida
- Coordinates: 27°54′10″N 81°16′20″W
- Basin countries: United States
- Max. length: 24 km (15 mi)
- Max. width: 10.7 km (6.6 mi)
- Surface area: 141.43 km^{2} (54.61 sq mi)
- Average depth: 5 feet (1.5 m)
- Max. depth: 12 feet (3.7 m)
- Surface elevation: 15 m (49 ft)

Lake Kissimmee is a lake located about 15 mi (24 km) east of Lake Wales, Florida, US. The lake is almost entirely in Osceola County, but the western shore, and a small part of the lake, is in Polk County.

Lake Kissimmee State Park is rich with wildlife, including bald eagles, white tailed deer, alligators, ospreys, bobcats, turkeys, and sandhill cranes. The main attraction is its "cow camp" where visitors can learn about 1876 era Florida cowboys.

The Joe Overstreet Road access to the lake is an internationally known area for birdwatching, with sandhill cranes, introduced whooping cranes, bald eagles, black vultures, and shorebirds prominent.

There are at least five islands in the lake. The largest is Brahma Island in the south. It is followed in size by Sturm Island in the north, which is separated from the mainland only by a narrow waterway. The other islands are Bird Island, Rabbit Island and Ox Island in the eastern part of the lake. Also Ox Island is separated from the mainland only by a very narrow waterway.

== See also ==
- Three Lakes Wildlife Management Area
- Camp Mack's River Resort
