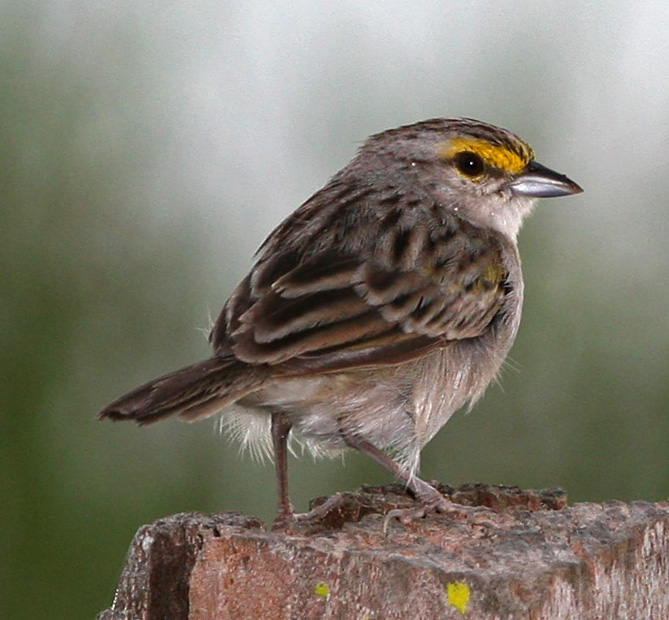
- Yellow-browed sparrow (A. aurifrons)

Scientific classification
- Kingdom: Animalia
- Phylum: Chordata
- Class: Aves
- Order: Passeriformes
- Family: Passerellidae
- Genus: Ammodramus; Swainson, 1827

Type species
- Ammodramus bimaculatus Swainson, 1827

Species
- See text

Synonyms
- Passerherbulus Maynard, 1895; Palaeostruthus

= Ammodramus =

Genus of birds

Ammodramus is a genus of birds in the family Passerellidae, in the group known as American sparrows. Birds of this genus are known commonly as grassland sparrows. The name Ammodramus is from the Greek for "sand runner".

These birds live in grassland habitat. Some Ammodramus are socially monogamous and both parents care for the young. Other species are polygynous with no pair bonding and no paternal care.

Several species were once included in this genus, but have been reclassified into the genera Ammospiza and Centronyx by sources such as Birdlife International and the American Ornithological Society. Current species in this genus include:

== Species ==
Genus Ammodramus – Swainson, 1827 – three species
Common name	Scientific name and subspecies	Range	Size and ecology	IUCN status and estimated population
Grasshopper sparrow	Ammodramus savannarum (Gmelin, 1789) Twelve subspecies: A. s. perpallidus (Coues, 1872); A. s. ammolegus Oberholser, 1942; A. s. pratensis (Vieillot, 1818); A. s. floridanus (Mearns, 1902); A. s. bimaculatus Swainson, 1827; A. s. beatriceae Olson, 1980; A. s. cracens (Bangs & Peck, 1908); A. s. caucae Chapman, 1912; A. s. savannarum (Gmelin, JF, 1789); A. s. intricatus Hartert, EJO, 1907; A. s. borinquensis Peters, JL, 1917; A. s. caribaeus (Hartert, EJO, 1902)	United States, Mexico, Central America and the Caribbean.	Size: Habitat: Diet:	LC
Grassland sparrow	Ammodramus humeralis (Bosc, 1792)	Argentina, Bolivia, Brazil, Colombia, French Guiana, Guyana, Paraguay, Peru, Suriname, Uruguay, and Venezuela.	Size: Habitat: Diet:	LC
Yellow-browed sparrow	Ammodramus aurifrons (Spix, 1825) Four subspecies: A. a. apurensis William Henry Phelps and Ernest Thomas Gilliard in 1941; A. a. cherriei Frank Chapman in 1914; A. a. tenebrosus John Todd Zimmer and Phelps in 1949; A. a. aurifrons Spix in 1825	South America	Size: Habitat: Diet:	LC

The fossil Ammodramus hatcheri (Late Miocene of Kansas, United States) was formerly placed in genus Palaeospiza or Palaeostruthus. The former may not be a passeriform at all, while the latter was eventually synonymized with Ammodramus, as A. hatcheri scarcely differs from the living species.
