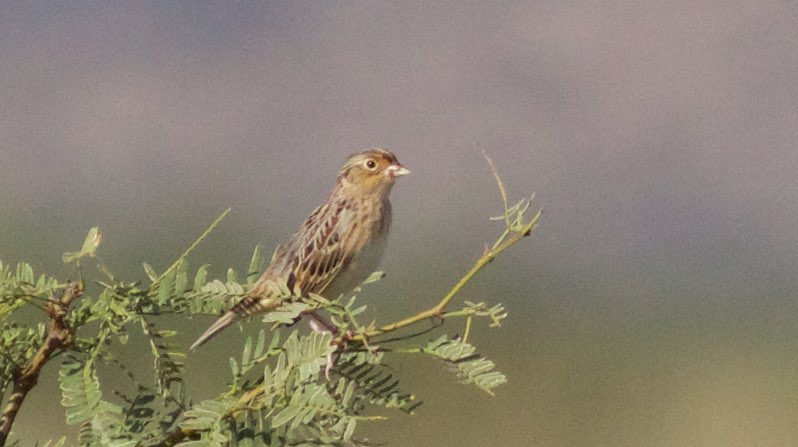

Conservation status
- Least Concern (IUCN 3.1)

Scientific classification
- Kingdom: Animalia
- Phylum: Chordata
- Class: Aves
- Order: Passeriformes
- Family: Passerellidae
- Genus: Ammodramus
- Species: A. savannarum

Binomial name
- Ammodramus savannarum (Gmelin, 1789)
- Breeding Year-round Nonbreeding

Synonyms
- Coturniculus savannarum

= Grasshopper sparrow =

Species of bird

The grasshopper sparrow (Ammodramus savannarum) is a small New World sparrow. It belongs to the genus Ammodramus, which contains three species that inhabit grasslands and prairies. Grasshopper sparrows are sometimes found in crop fields and they will readily colonize reclaimed grassland. In the core of their range, grasshopper sparrows are dependent upon large areas of grassland where they avoid trees and shrubs. They seek out heterogenous patches of prairie that contain clumps of dead grass or other vegetation where they conceal their nest, and also contain barer ground where they forage for insects (especially grasshoppers), spiders, and seeds. Grasshopper sparrows are unusual among New World sparrows in that they sing two distinct song types, the prevalence of which varies with the nesting cycle. The primary male song, a high trill preceded by a stereotyped series of short chips, is reminiscent of the sounds of grasshoppers and is the origin of this species' name. Like some other birds of the central North American grasslands, this species also moves around a lot, not only via annual migrations, but individuals frequently disperse between breeding attempts or breeding seasons. Grasshopper sparrows are in steep decline across their range, even in the core of the breeding distribution in the tallgrass prairies of the central Great Plains. The Florida grasshopper sparrow (Ammodramus savannarum floridanus) is highly endangered.

== Taxonomy ==
The grasshopper sparrow was described in 1713 by English parson and naturalist John Ray based on a specimen collected in Jamaica. It was described again and illustrated in 1725 by the naturalist and collector Hans Sloane. Both authors used the English name "Savanna bird". When the German naturalist Johann Friedrich Gmelin revised and expanded Carl Linnaeus's Systema Naturae in 1789 he included the grasshopper sparrow. He placed it with the finches in the genus Fringilla, coined the binomial name Fringilla savannarum and cited the earlier authors. The grasshopper sparrow is now placed with two other American sparrows in the genus Ammodramus that was introduced by William Swainson in 1827.

Twelve subspecies are recognised:

- A. s. perpallidus (Coues, 1872) – southwest Canada and central/west USA
- A. s. ammolegus Oberholser, 1942 – southern Arizona (southwest USA), northwest Mexico
- A. s. pratensis (Vieillot, 1818) – southeast Canada, eastern USA; winters in Cuba and Central America
- A. s. floridanus (Mearns, 1902) – Florida grasshopper sparrow - south-central Florida (southeast USA)
- A. s. bimaculatus Swainson, 1827 – central/south Mexico, Guatemala, Nicaragua and Costa Rica
- A. s. beatriceae Olson, 1980 – central Panama
- A. s. cracens (Bangs & Peck, 1908) – north/east Guatemala, Belize, east Honduras, northeast Nicaragua
- A. s. caucae Chapman, 1912 – Colombia, Ecuador
- A. s. savannarum (Gmelin, JF, 1789) – Jamaica
- A. s. intricatus Hartert, EJO, 1907 – Hispaniola (Dominican Republic, Haiti)
- A. s. borinquensis Peters, JL, 1917 – Puerto Rico
- A. s. caribaeus (Hartert, EJO, 1902) – ABC islands

== Description ==
These small sparrows measure 10–14 cm (3.9–5.5 in) in length, span about 17.5 cm (6.9 in) across the wings and weigh from 13.8 to 28.4 g (0.49 to 1.00 oz), with an average of 17 g (0.60 oz). Adults have upper parts streaked with brown, grey, black and white; they have a light brown breast, a white belly and a short brown tail. Their face is light brown with a white eye ring and a dark brown crown with a central narrow light stripe. Adults sport bright yellow feathers at the crook of their underwing, and have a yellow-to-amber patch above their lores. Males and females cannot be distinguished by their plumage, and young birds molt into adult plumage within a few months of fledging.

== Distribution and habitat ==
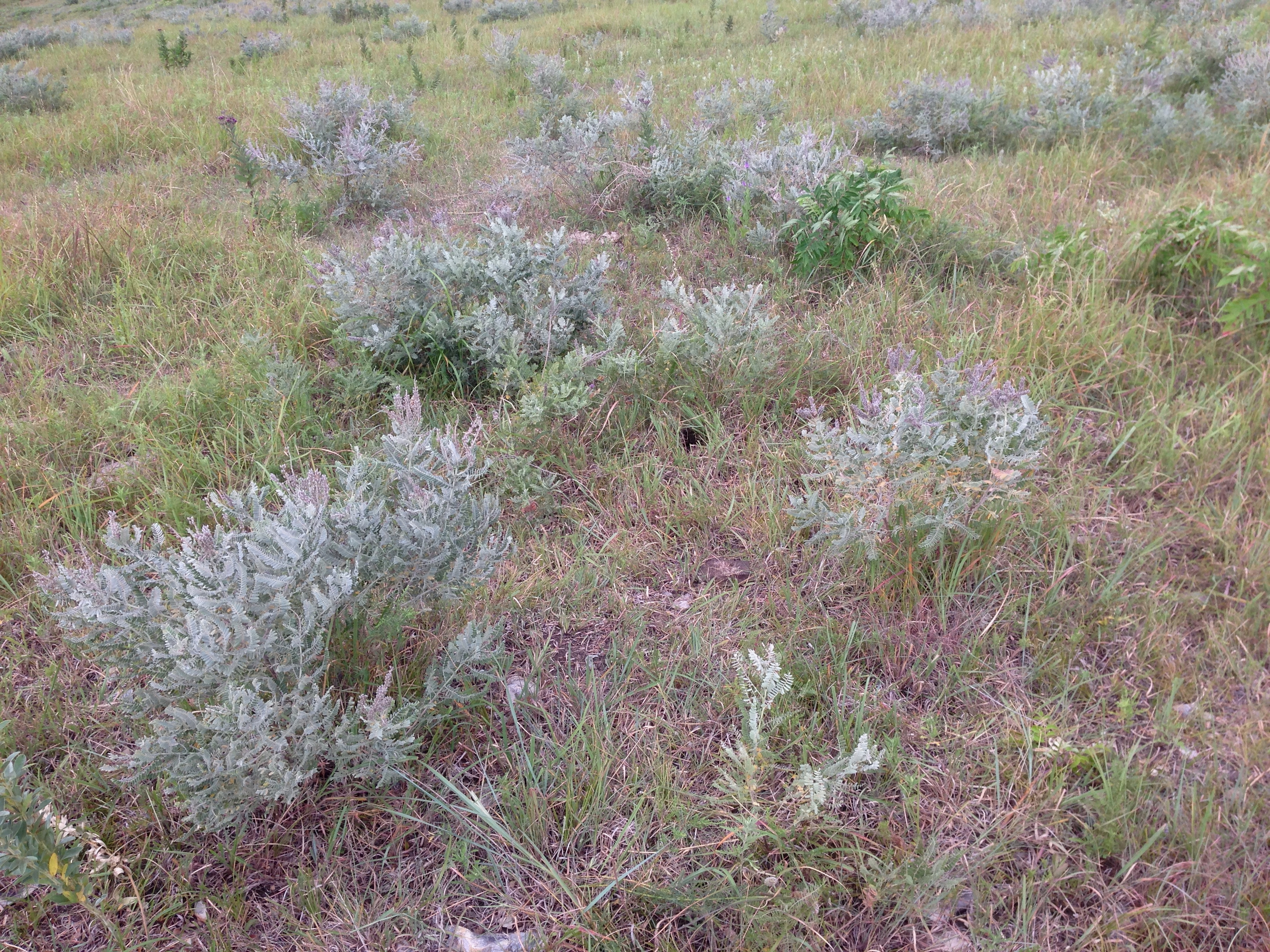
Late-July grasshopper sparrow territory with nest at the Konza Prairie showing preferred patchiness of vegetation including low ground for foraging and denser patches in which to conceal nests.

Their breeding habitat is open fields and prairie grasslands across southern Canada, the United States, Mexico and Central America, the Caribbean. There is a small endangered population in the Andes of Colombia and Ecuador. In the central USA, birds are quick to locate newly available habitat, and can be attracted to sites by playing conspecific song. The spatial distribution of territories on the landscape can be clumped with several individuals defending territories near to one another interspersed by large areas of unused and apparently suitable habitat. The reasons for this clumping are elusive; aggregation is not related to group defense against predators or brood parasite, cooperative care, extra-pair matings, or kin selection. Appropriate habitat is strongly influenced by plant structure and precipitation amounts during previous seasons. Grasshopper sparrows avoid woody vegetation, and in the wetter parts of their range, prefer fields that are burned every 2–3 years (which reduces encroachment of trees and shrubs) and seek out areas that are moderately grazed by cattle or bison.

== Behavior ==
=== Movement ===
==== Migration ====
Subspecies of grasshopper sparrows differ in their migratory behavior. The birds breeding in most of the eastern US and southern Canada (A. s. pratensis) migrate latitudinally up to several thousand kms each year, spending winters along the Gulf of Mexico and the Caribbean. The birds breeding through most of the Western part of their North American range (A. s. perpallidus) winter from Texas west to California, and south into the highland desert grasslands of northern and central Mexico. A. s. ammolegus, which breeds in the desert grasslands of SE Arizona, SW New Mexico, and adjoining states in northern Mexico, appears to be a short-distance, partial migrant, with some birds remaining resident year-round, and others likely moving further south in winter. Birds of multiple breeding populations and subspecies winter together in SE Arizona. Grasshopper sparrows breeding outside of North America, including those living in the Caribbean, Central America, as well as the Florida grasshopper sparrow are not known to migrate.

Males typically migrate north in the spring a week or two earlier than do females. Data from light level geolocators indicate that males are present on the breeding grounds from April to October, consistent with birds completing their annual molt prior to migration. Individuals migrated an average of ~2,500 km over ~30 days. Birds migrate mostly over land, make few stop-overs of short duration, and travel at about 82 km/day. Data from the Motus network largely confirm the migratory patterns gleaned from prior work. However, relatively few movement tracks for this species exist so far, potentially due to the sparrows' secretive behavior during most of the year other than the breeding season. Few recoveries of banded birds have ever been made, especially at sites other than a birds' initial banding location. In Oklahoma, grasshopper sparrows are one of the species most frequently found dead after colliding with windows, despite rarely being detected in migration.

==== Dispersal ====
In Maryland, a study of natal dispersal (the movement from a natal site to the site of first reproduction) revealed that most fledglings remained within their natal habitat during the summer months after fledging, and most recaptured fledglings were encountered within a couple hundred meters of their natal nests. Although distances recaptured from the nest increased with time, the average fledgling was recaptured only 346 meters from its nest and recaptured 33 days after fledging. The longest distance detected was 1.6 kilometers, which was accomplished in less than 20 days. Data on first-year return rates (or "philopatry", the inverse of natal dispersal) is limited, but in NE Kansas, ~2% of young birds returned to the site to breed in the subsequent year.

Grasshopper sparrows are unusual in their particularly high rates of breeding dispersal (i.e., one-way movements between successive breeding sites). Their high dispersal tendency may be due to the dynamic nature of the grassland environments on which they depend Like some other grassland-dependent species, their dispersal movements lead them to be called semi-nomadic, as they opportunistically take advantage of suitable habitats as they appear on the landscape. Return rates of adult grasshopper sparrows to their previous breeding sites (site fidelity) differs widely between populations. Site fidelity is far higher in eastern parts of the breeding range, with >50% of adult males returning to breed in subsequent seasons at a site in Connecticut and over 70% in Maryland. In contrast, 0% of adult males in Nebraska returned to breed in subsequent years, 8.9% returned in Montana, and 20% returned in California. In northeastern Kansas, individual birds also commonly disperse within seasons between nesting attempts. Between 30 and 75% of birds move over 100 m within season, and individuals were detected defending new territories or nesting up to 8.9 km from areas they occupied earlier in the season. Within-season breeding dispersal decisions relate to nest success; more birds moved following nest failure, and birds that dispersed experienced lower brood parasitism and higher nesting success following movements. Little is known about the movements of birds during winter, but inter-annual variation in abundance in northern Mexican grasslands is positively related to related to broad-scale variation in vegetation, rainfall the previous summer, and plant productivity.

=== Breeding ===
Grasshopper sparrows are a socially monogamous species, but rates of extra-pair mating can be high (e.g., 48.5% of nests contained an extra-pair young in Kansas), and even instances of cooperative parenting have been documented. In the spring, males select and defend territories before being joined by a female. Over the course of the breeding season, birds can raise multiple broods, either with the same mate or a different mate. In the more southern regions of the species range, pairs may produce 2–4 broods while pairs further north are limited by shorter summers leading to 1–2 nesting attempts.

Nest building

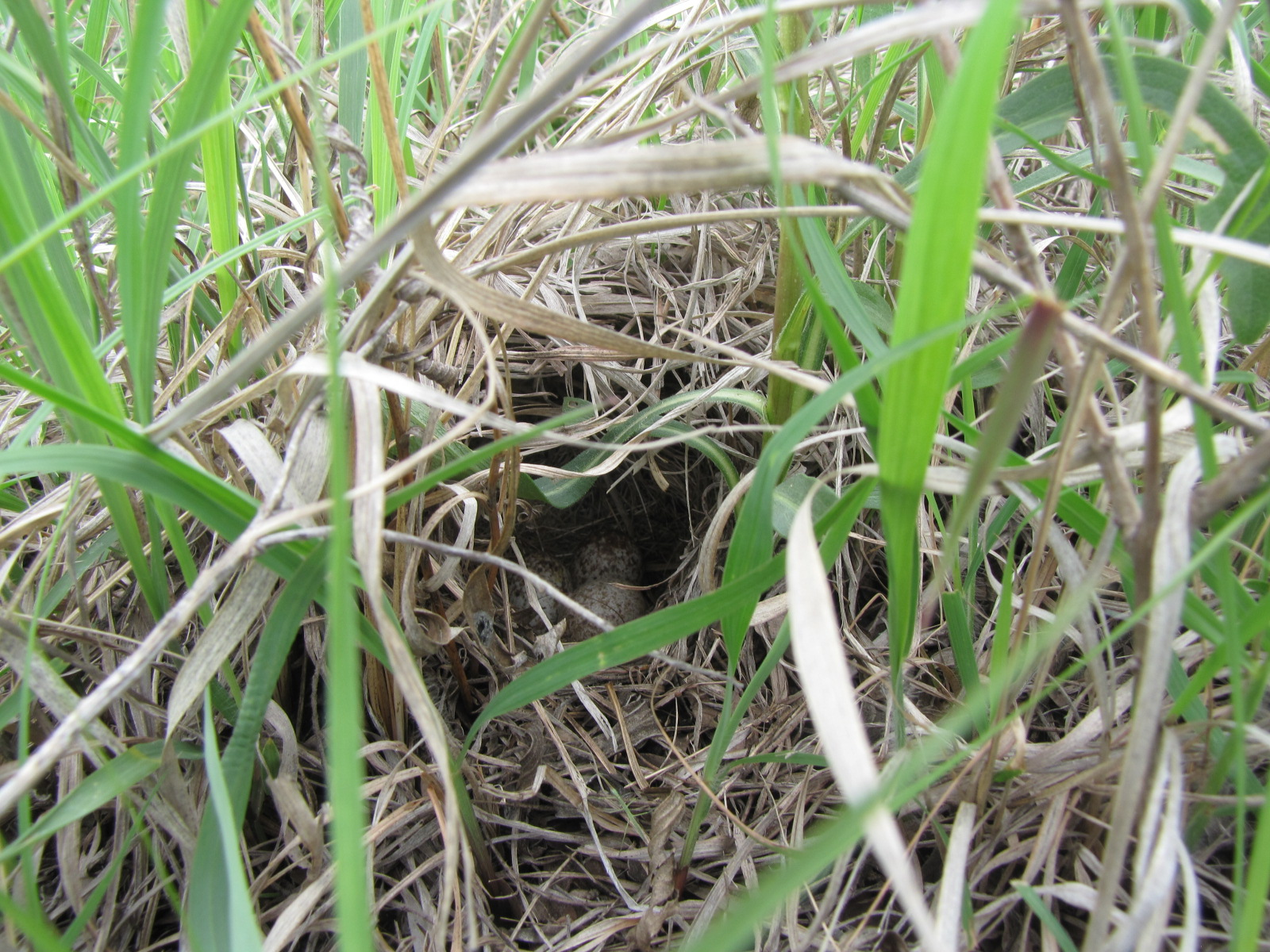
Well-concealed grasshopper sparrow nest showing domed structure and side entrance

Females construct nests over the course of a couple of days. Grasshopper sparrows build inconspicuous, dome-shaped nests on the ground, typically very well hidden amongst grasses and forbs. The nests have a small side opening and are usually made of a mix of dead and live grasses. Nests are built on the breeding pair's territory in areas away from shrubs and trees.

Offspring

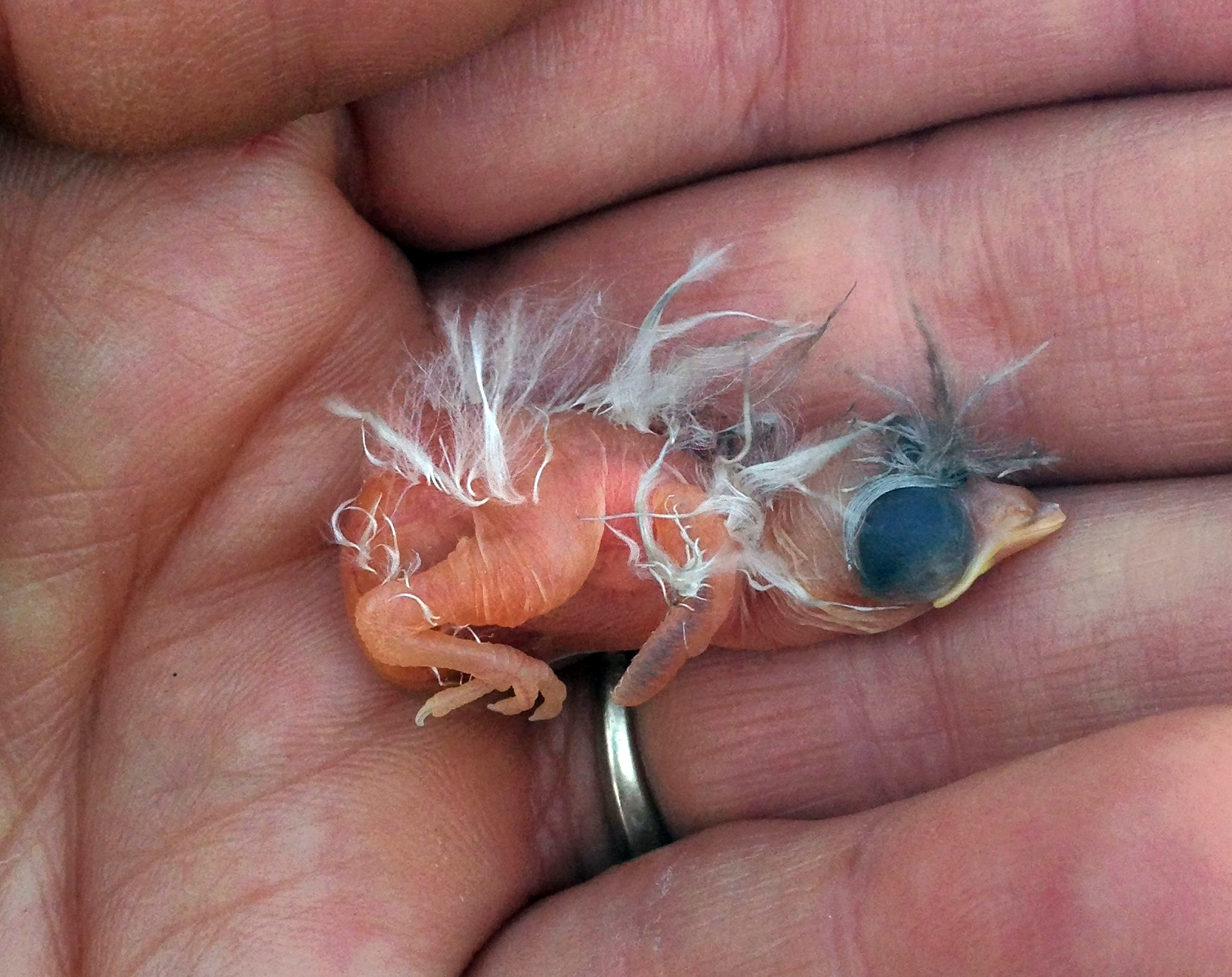
Nestling grasshopper sparrow within an hour or so of hatching (handled as part of permitted research) at the Konza Prairie, Kansas.

Females typically lay between 4–5 eggs per clutch. Grasshopper sparrow eggs are smooth and oval-shaped. They are a cream-white color, with reddish-brown speckling that is concentrated towards the larger end of the egg. Females incubate the eggs from 10 to 12 days, and nestlings fledge after 6–9 days. For the first few days of the nestling period, females primarily feed young, but both parents feed during the latter half of the nestling period. In one study, nonparental helpers were documented attending to broods and feeding young, but this behavior is apparently not ubiquitous. Nestlings are fed an arthropod rich diet, particularly prey ~15–40 mm long, and preferentially select acridid grasshoppers, spiders, and small beetles. Upon leaving the nest, the offspring often remain in the area. Parents provide post-fledging care, but the duration and level of care is unknown.

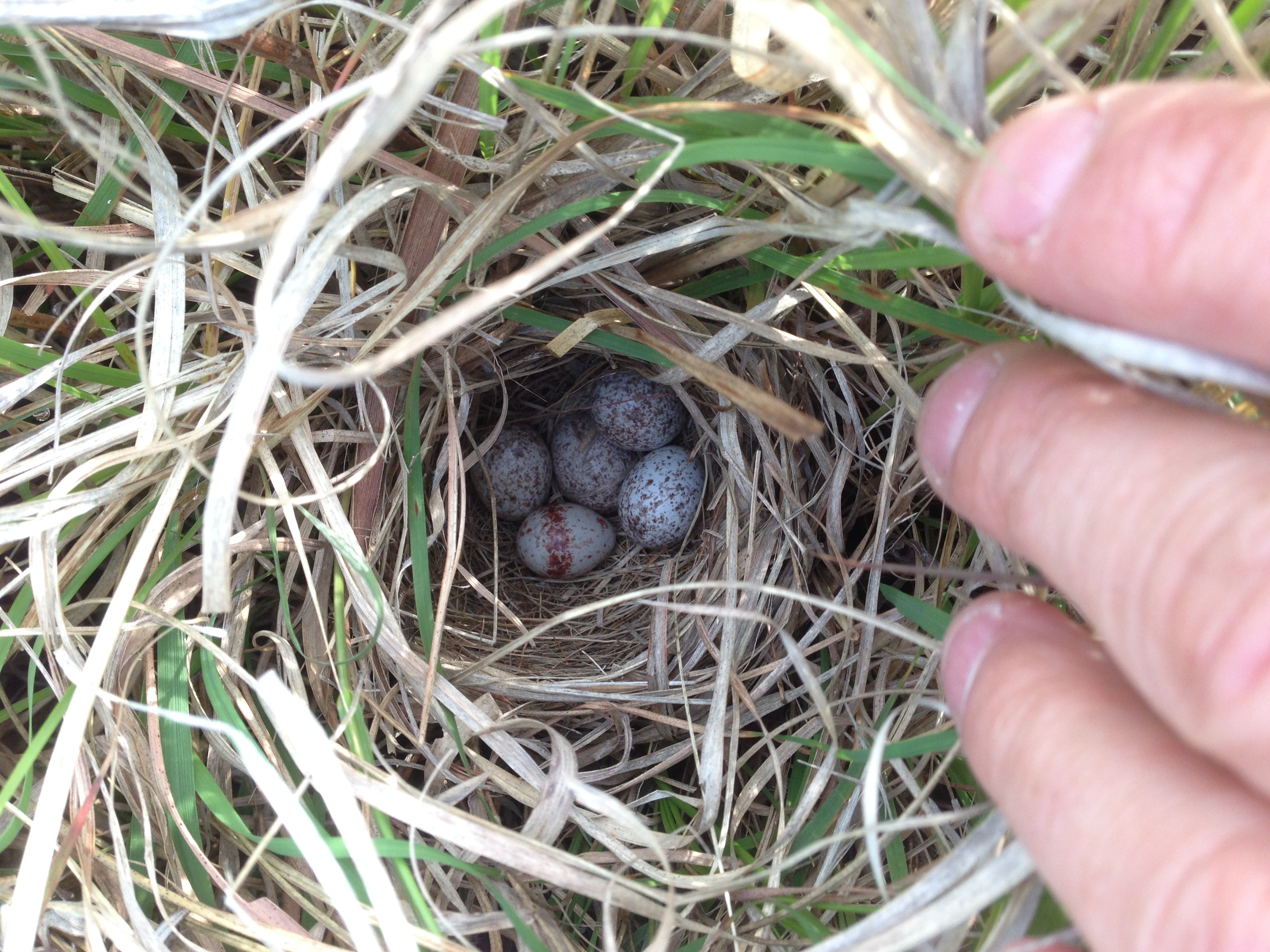
Grasshopper sparrow nest with four cowbird eggs & one host egg

Brood parasitism

Grasshopper sparrows are a common host of the brown-headed cowbird, a brood parasite which lays their eggs in the nests of other species. Cowbirds can be detrimental to host species because they often remove host eggs and nestlings or destroy nests to initiate another nesting attempt, allowing for future parasitism. However, they do not necessarily reduce the chances of nests successfully fledging young. The rate of brood parasitism by brown-headed cowbirds varies across the grasshopper sparrow's range and depends on habitat characteristics such as the amount of woody vegetation and whether the land is grazed. In surveyed populations, 2–65% of nests were parasitized by cowbirds.

Causes of nest failure

Only 30–50% of nests successfully raise at least one or more nestlings that fledge the nest. The majority of grasshopper sparrow nests fail as the result of predation. Snakes, small mammals such as rats, larger mammals such as skunks, armadillos, hogs, and opossums, and even ants have been observed eating eggs and nestlings. Other causes of nest failure include flooding of the nest cup due to rainfall, trampling by livestock or humans, and abandonment by the parents.

In Florida, grasshopper sparrows may be eaten by some growth stage of invasive snakes such as Burmese pythons, reticulated pythons, Southern African rock pythons, Central African rock pythons, boa constrictors, yellow anacondas, Bolivian anacondas, dark-spotted anacondas, and green anacondas.

== Vocalizations ==
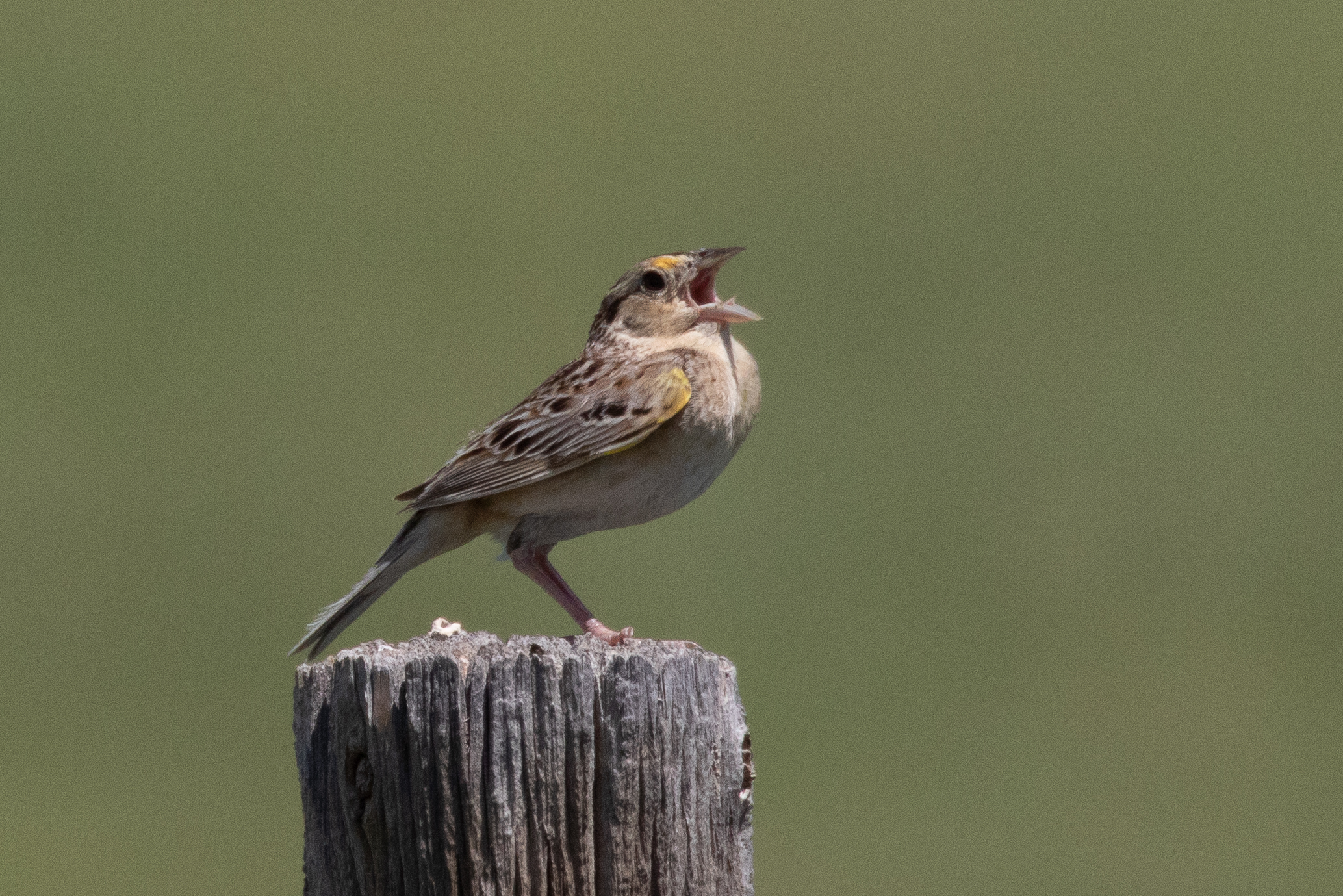
Grasshopper sparrow singing

Vocalizing, Suffield, CT

=== Primary song ===
Primary Song

The grasshopper sparrow's "primary" or "buzz" song has one to four introductory notes followed by a long high pitched trill,'tup zeeee' or 'tip tup zeee', and because of its similarity to a grasshopper sound, accounts for the name of the bird. There are small variations in the song between individuals, populations, and subspecies. This song is primarily used for defense, territory, or advertising to the other males and females. The males will mainly use the primary song from mid-April, when they get to the breeding ground, to mid-August, when they are about to leave the breeding grounds. It is the principal song heard early in the season, and during each breeding cycle, and the only song that unpaired birds sing. Birds sing from a grass or forb stalks, poles, fence posts or fence lines, or low shrubs.

=== Alternate song ===
Alternate Song
Alternate song of the grasshopper sparrow

Male grasshopper sparrows sing "alternate", warble", or "sustained", songs during the breeding season to establish and maintain pair bonds. The alternate song is more musical than the primary song and is usually delivered from fixed perches or in flight. The song consists of a 5–15 second series of short notes varying slightly in pitch, and the entire sequence may be repeated two to four times. Paired males will start singing alternate song ~5 days after arrival on territory, with frequency of alternate song increasing as birds pair. The alternate song diminishes towards late-July as the breeding season winds down. Considerable variation in alternate song exists within and between populations and subspecies; further study is needed.

=== Male trill ===
The trill of a male grasshopper sparrow (ti-tu-ti-tu-ti-i-i-i-i) is one of his least common vocalizations and is difficult to detect. Sometimes called the nesting song, it consists of short, rapid notes and a downward trill. The song is usually used after two grasshopper sparrows form a pair and is mostly made in response to the female. The male trills near the nest either from the ground or a perch. The male trill functions to strengthen pair bonds and to tell the female/young the male is approaching the nest.

=== Female trill ===
The female trill (ti-ti-i-i-i-i-i) is used to announce presence in male's territory. The primary functions of the female trill is to declare her presence to the male, maintain the pair bond, and signal to both the male and the young that she is approaching the nest. Given the high rate of extra-pair copulations in this species, the trill may also function to announce her presence to a territorial male other than the social male. Females usually call from the ground, concealed in grass, and may call independently or in response to primary or sustained song. Females call from pair formation until the end of nesting.

=== Call/chip ===
The call or chip is used by both sexes and is used as an alarm note. Depending on its intensity, the sound varies. High intensity alarms resemble a slow clicking, and low intensity alarms are a sharp 'tik'. The chip is used around the nest by both the female and male using single and double 'chip-chip' calls. This call can be used during feeding when they utter a single, high-pitched chip.

=== Song learning ===
Captive-rearing experiments revealed that grasshopper sparrows are predisposed to learn two distinct songs but must hear species-typical songs to develop a normal sounding song. Grasshopper sparrows can learn song from pre-recorded tutors but are more inclined to learn songs that are similar to live tutors, suggesting they use information from song models but do not directly imitate conspecific song. It is likely that in the case of alternate songs, exact notes are imitated but sequences are invented or improvised. This may be beneficial for pair bonding if females identify individual males by their distinct alternate song.

== Conservation ==
=== Current status ===
The global population of grasshopper sparrows in 2016 was estimated to be around 31,000,000 by the PIF North America Landbird Conservation Plan. It was also estimated that the population had undergone a 68% decrease between the years 1970 and 2014 with an annual decline of about 2.59%. The 2022 State of the Birds reported a long-term, range-wide decline of 2.13% per year, and a more recent decline of 3.48% per year. The leading cause of population decline across its range is linked to habitat loss and management, particularly conversion of grasslands to intensive agriculture and encroachment of shrubs and trees. Despite declining population sizes, grasshopper sparrows are classified as Least Concern by the IUCN and are also not included as a "Bird of Conservation Concern" by the U.S. Fish and Wildlife Services (USFWS) on a national level. The Florida grasshopper sparrow subspecies (Ammodramus savannarum floridanus) is classified as endangered by the USFW. This subspecies hit an all time population low of 15 breeding pairs in 2017, and reported a population of 120 in 2022.

==== Habitat management ====
The majority of the former breeding range of grasshopper sparrows in North America has been converted to intensive agriculture or encroached by shrubs and trees. Likewise, these birds are experiencing a loss of wintering habitats, particularly within the Chihuahuan grasslands, due to similar impacts (conversion to agriculture and woody encroachment). Because grasshopper sparrows require areas of dense dead grass for nesting, sparse vegetation for foraging, and little to no woody plants, they are vulnerable to management practices such as high-intensity grazing accompanied by annual burning, fire suppression leading to woody encroachment, and haying that can destroy nests if it occurs during the breeding season. Ideal grazing intensities and fire frequencies vary across their range depending on climate, but areas with moderate grazing by cattle or bison, prescribed burning every 2–3 years, and removal of woody plants tend to support the highest densities of grasshopper sparrows in the Southern great plains.

== Gallery ==
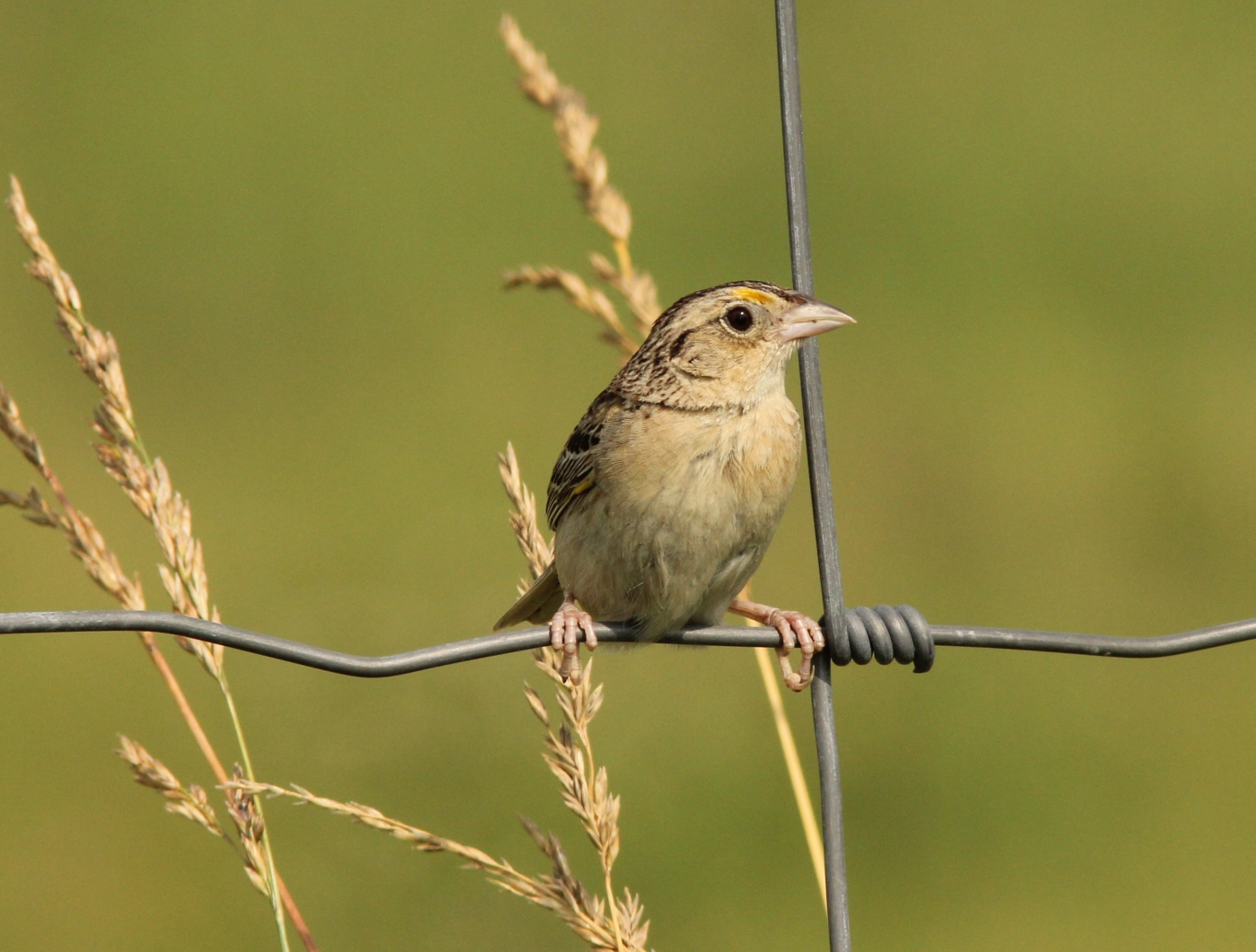
Grasshopper sparrow

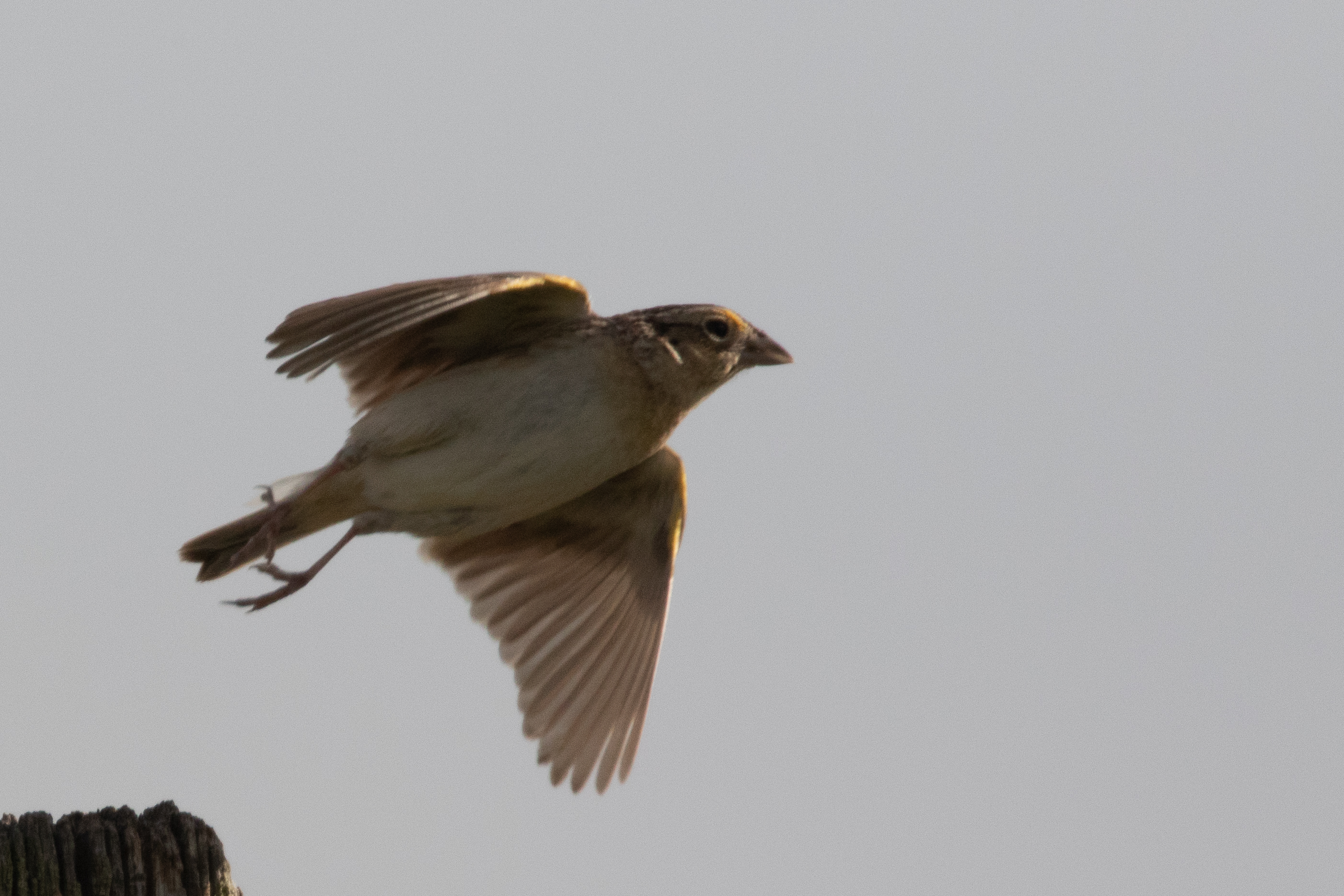
Grasshopper sparrow flying

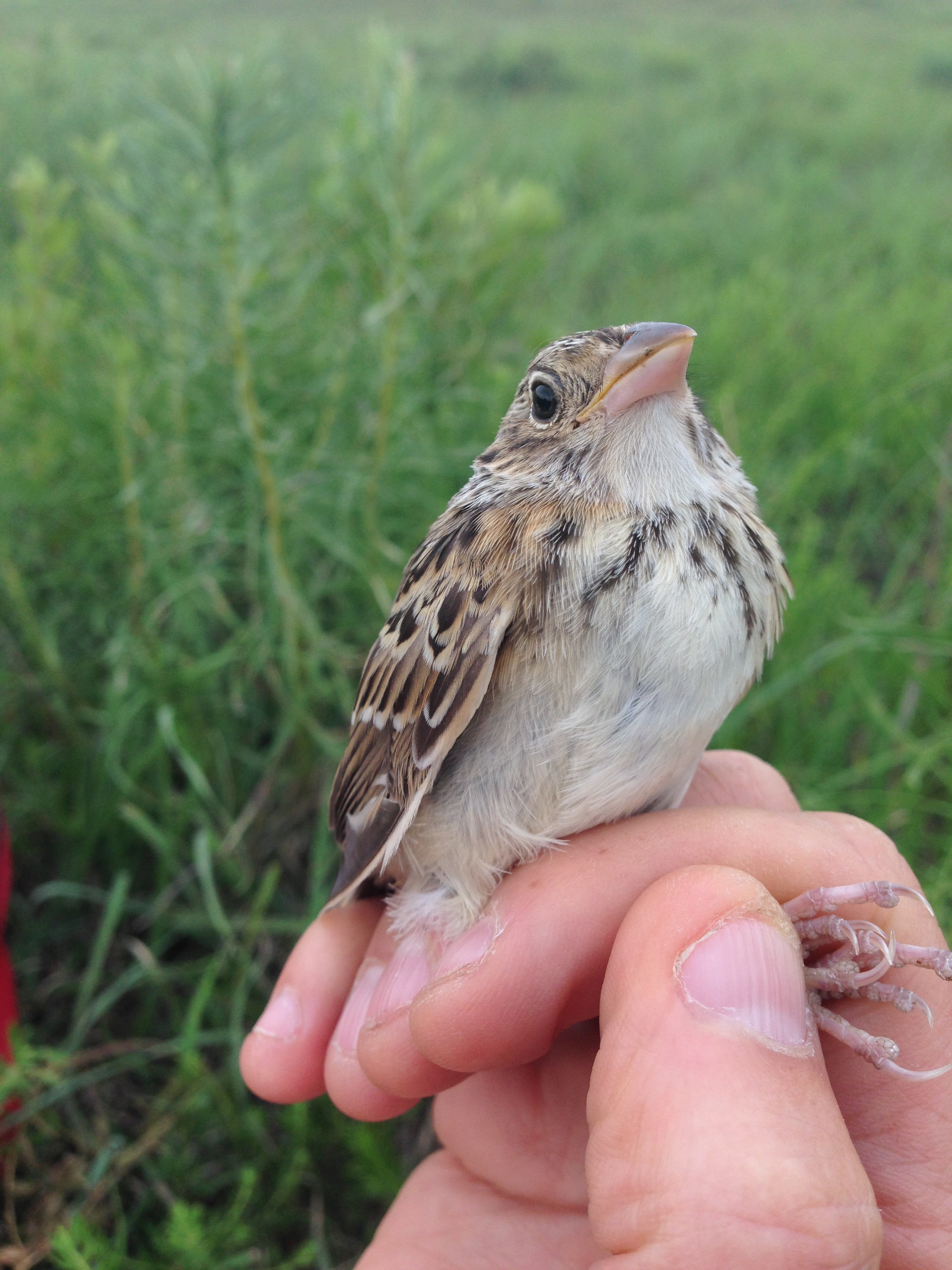
Juvenile grasshopper sparrow
