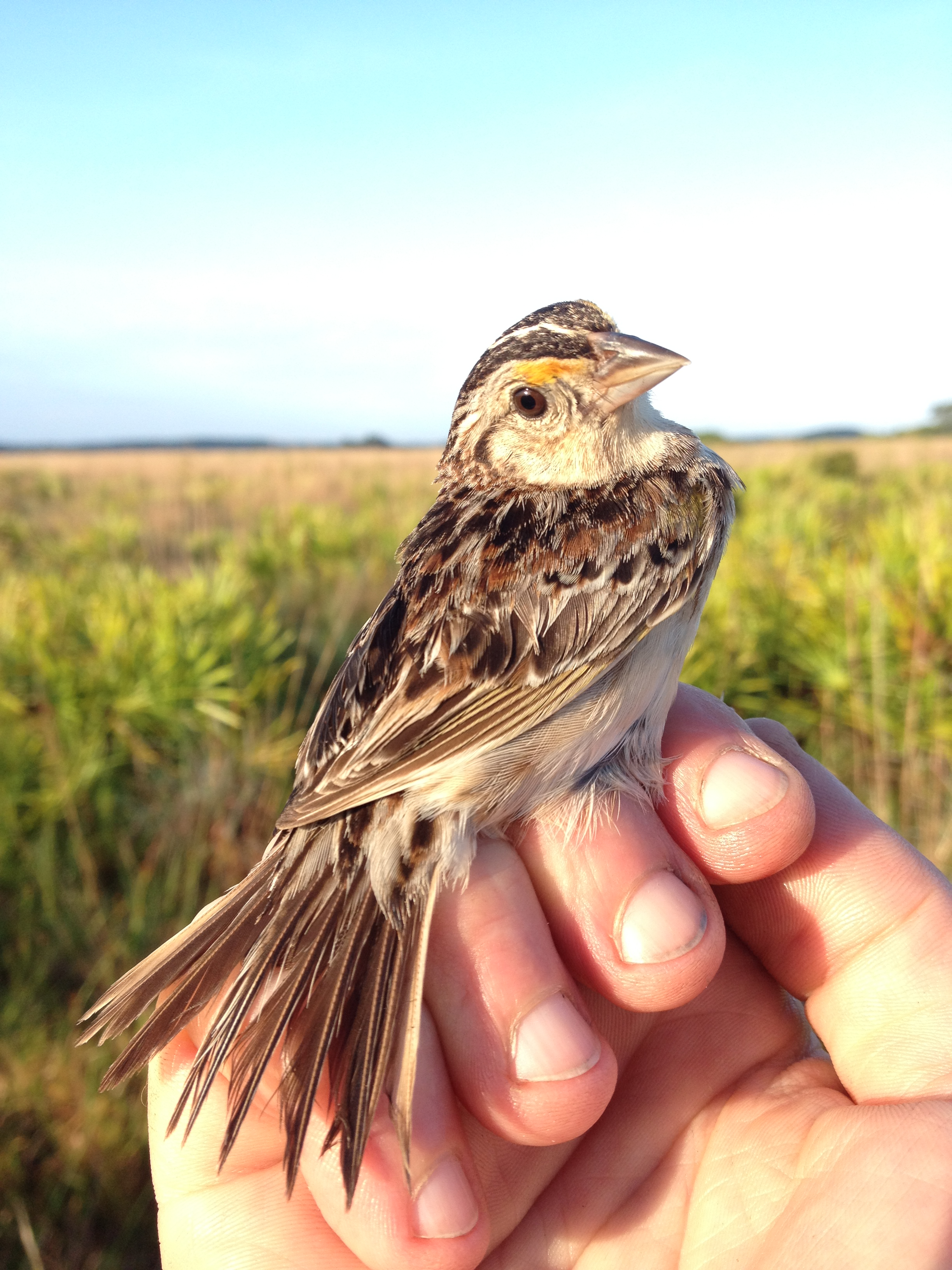

Conservation status
- Critically Imperiled (NatureServe)

- Endangered (ESA)

Scientific classification
- Kingdom: Animalia
- Phylum: Chordata
- Class: Aves
- Order: Passeriformes
- Family: Passerellidae
- Genus: Ammodramus
- Species: A. savannarum
- Subspecies: A. s. floridanus

Trinomial name
- Ammodramus savannarum floridanus (Mearns, 1902)
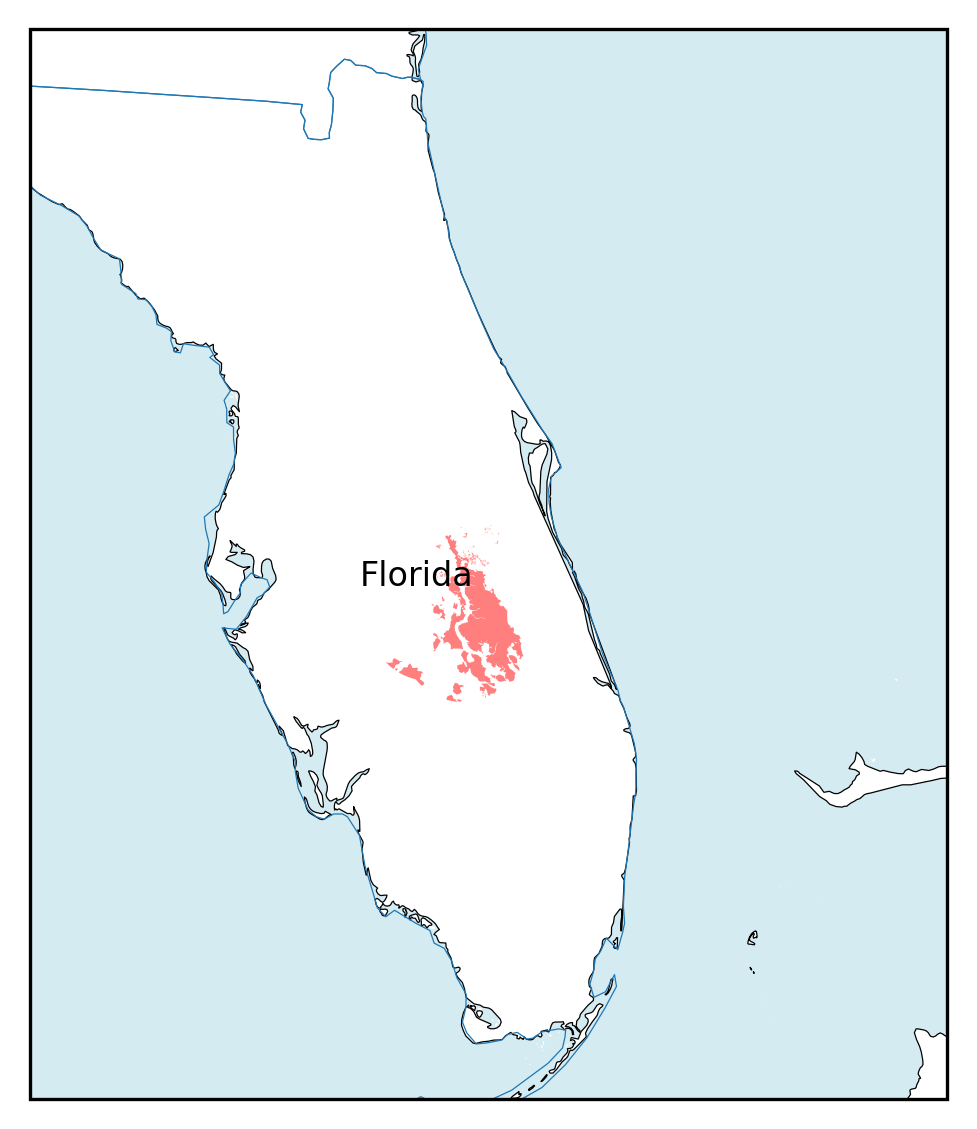

Synonyms
- Coturniculus savannarum floridanus Mearns, 1902

= Florida grasshopper sparrow =

Subspecies of bird

The Florida grasshopper sparrow (Ammodramus savannarum floridanus) is an endangered subspecies of grasshopper sparrow native to the dry prairies of south-central Florida.

The Florida grasshopper sparrow is one of four subspecies of grasshopper sparrows in North America, and is perhaps the most endangered. Efforts by biologists have slowed population decline.

== Description ==
The Florida grasshopper sparrow is a small sparrow with a short tail and rounded head, averaging 13 cm in total length when fully grown. Like most grasshopper sparrows, their wings are brown, white, and grey in color, with patches of yellow on the alula and supercilium. Adult sparrows have white undersides with a buff throat and breast, while juveniles have streaked breasts. The Florida grasshopper sparrow has a longer bill and tarsi than other subspecies, and lacks reddish streaks on its nape.

The song of the Florida grasshopper sparrow sounds much like that of a grasshopper, from which it gets its name. Males only sing a few hours a day during the breeding season, and they often perch on twigs or dead palmetto leaves to sing when available. Singing most frequently occurs during the early morning and early evening hours, around sunrise and sunset.

== Habitat ==
Though some migratory grasshopper sparrows are distributed throughout parts of both North and South America, the Florida grasshopper sparrow is a non-migratory species, and is thus limited in distribution to the prairie region of south-central Florida. Counties in Florida where this species has been sighted include Glades, Highlands, Polk, Okeechobee, and Osceola counties.

Habitat requirements for the Florida grasshopper sparrow are quite specific. Recommended habitat consists of large tracts of poorly drained grasslands with a frequent history of fire and a limited number of trees (less than one tree per acre). Common plant species found in this habitat include bluestem and wiregrass, with occasional saw palmettos as well. As grasshopper sparrows are largely a ground-dwelling species, some bare ground is necessary as well to provide areas for movement and foraging purposes.

Florida grasshopper sparrows are the only subspecies of grasshopper sparrow known to breed in the state of Florida. They are known to nest between April and August on the ground at the base of a small shrub or clump of grass. Their nests are often constructed of available plant matter nearby, which mainly consists of the leaves of bluestem and wiregrass. Females are known to lay between 3-5 eggs, and the young fledge about 10 days after hatching. Nest success rates are often quite low, with one study observing success rates of between 10 and 33% at multiple sites.

Only three locations in Florida are now known to definitively support wild populations of the sparrow, and populations are declining in all three. However, there are reports of at least two other subpopulations on private lands, which Audubon Florida plans to acquire or give conservation easements for.

== Diet ==
Florida grasshopper sparrows are omnivores, with most of their diet consisting of insects, such as grasshoppers, crickets, beetles, and moths. Most of the vegetation in the sparrow's diet is made up of sedge seeds and star grass seeds. Florida grasshopper sparrows forage near the ground, and thus, frequent fires are essential to maintain areas of bare ground for foraging.

== Population trends ==
Until large scale surveys were undertaken in the 1980s to determine the abundance and distribution of the subspecies, the number of Florida grasshopper sparrows present in the wild was largely unknown. Following these surveys, it was determined by the US Fish and Wildlife Service that the Florida grasshopper sparrow be listed as endangered on the Endangered Species List. Subsequent surveys performed in the 1990s estimated fewer than 500 adult Florida grasshopper sparrows, and recent work estimates that, under present habitat conditions, there is a 22% chance of extinction of the subspecies within the next 50 years. The survival of the subspecies is highly dependent upon habitat availability, with another model connecting a loss of habitat to a 66% chance of extinction. Based on population trends, the subspecies was predicted to possibly become extinct in the wild as soon as 2018–2019. However, recent conservation efforts prevented this.

== Conservation ==
As of 2017, there were an estimated 50-60 Florida grasshopper sparrows left in the wild. This shows a dramatic decline from 2004, when population estimates were 1,000. The population decline is attributed to hatchling predation by invasive fire ants, extreme weather flooding nests, loss of habitat, and competition with non-native species. This decline has prompted the initiation of captive breeding programs by the Rare Species Conservatory Foundation and White Oak Conservation. In 2015, 23 eggs threatened by nest flooding were transported to the Rare Species Conservatory Foundation, where 21 successfully hatched via artificial incubation. By mid-June 2017, White Oak Conservation had produced 18 chicks from 3 pairs of adults that were born in the wild and their five offspring. Captive breeding has been hindered by diseases caused by an infectious gut parasite, though solutions are being worked on. Due to the subspecies' possible extinction in the wild by 2018–2019, there has been some controversy over what to do with the remaining wild population. Some biologists support capturing all remaining wild individuals and using them in the captive breeding program for genetic diversity, while others state that these individuals should stay in the wild, as they are important in studying how this subspecies behaves and survives in nature. On May 9, 2019, FWC announced the planned release of captive-bred sparrows on public lands in Osceola County over the following weeks, in an effort to bolster wild populations currently estimated at fewer than 80 sparrows. A 2022 review by the U.S. Fish and Wildlife Service reported an increase in population to 136 males, the highest reported number since 2010. The report says, "Evidence of unpaired males at all sites indicates that the population is male-biased, which is typical with small populations, and can lead to inbreeding and loss of genetic diversity, difficulty locating mates, increased susceptibility to diseases, and risk of extinction."
