= List of nature centers in Florida =

There are nature centers and environmental education centers throughout the state of Florida.

Name	Location	County	Region	Summary
Amelia Island Nature Center	Amelia Island	Nassau	Greater Jacksonville	website, operated by Amelia Island Plantation
Anne Kolb Nature Center	Hollywood	Broward	South	website, located in the municipal West Lake Park, 1,500 acres of coastal mangrove wetlands, 3,500-gallon saltwater aquarium
Apalachicola Environmental Education and Training Center	Eastpoint	Franklin	Florida Panhandle	website, operated by the State, features tanks and exhibits about the river, bay and gulf habitats found in Apalachicola
Arch Creek Park Museum & Nature Center	North Miami	Miami-Dade	South	8 acres, operated by the County, museum features Native American artifacts
Archbold Biological Station	Venus	Highlands	Central	5,192.63-acre (21 km2) research institute, open to visitors, environmental education programs
Audubon Center for Birds of Prey	Maitland	Orange	Central	website, raptor rehabilitation and environmental education center, operated by the National Audubon Society
Audubon House	Vero Beach	Indian River County	Central	website, an environmental education center surrounded by 444 acre Oslo Riverfront Conservation Area, operated by the Pelican Island Audubon Society
Audubon Resource Center at Lettuce Lake	Tampa	Hillsborough	Tampa Bay Area	Operated by the Tampa Audubon Society in the 240-acre park
Back to Nature Wildlife Refuge & Education Center	Orlando	Orange	Central	Facebook site, wildlife rehabilitation center
Bahia Honda State Park	Marathon	Monroe	South	524 acres, Sand and Sea Nature Center features displays about local sea and shore life, including corals, shells, crabs, sea urchins, drift seeds, sea sponges and sea turtles
Barrier Island Sanctuary Management and Education Center	Melbourne Beach	Brevard	Central	34 acres in the Archie Carr National Wildlife Refuge, operated by the County, partners with Sea Turtle Conservancy for sea turtle guided walks
Bill Sadowski Park and Nature Center	Miami	Miami-Dade	South	website, operated by the County, 30 acres
Blowing Rocks Preserve	Jupiter Island	Martin	Treasure Coast	73 acres, owned by the Nature Conservancy, Hawley Education Center features rotating natural history and art exhibits
Bonita Nature Place	Bonita Springs	Lee	Southwest	website, operated by the City, 30 acres, preserve for gopher tortoises, bee house, bat house
Boyd Hill Nature Preserve	St. Petersburg	Pinellas	Tampa Bay Area	Operated by St. Petersburg Parks & Recreation, 245 acres, features the Boyd Hill Environmental Center
Brooker Creek Preserve Environmental Education Center	Tarpon Springs	Pinellas	Tampa Bay Area	Approximately 8,700 acres, operated by the County
Busch Wildlife Sanctuary	Jupiter	Palm Beach	South	website, nature center and wildlife rehabilitation hospital
Calusa Nature Center and Planetarium	Fort Myers	Lee	Southwest	Includes the museum, 105 acres with three nature trails, a planetarium, butterfly and bird aviaries
Camp Bayou Outdoor Learning Center	Ruskin	Hillsborough	Tampa Bay Area	website, 160-acre preserve, environmental education and hands-on learning center
Castellow Hammock Preserve & Nature Center	Miami	Miami-Dade	South	website, 112 acres, operated by the County
Cedar Point Environmental Park	Englewood	Charlotte	Southwest	website, 115 acres with pine flatwoods, salt marsh, mangrove fringe and hammock areas, environmental center
Charlotte Harbor Environmental Center	Punta Gorda	Charlotte	Southwest	website, provides over 20 different educational programs, manages 8 environmentally sensitive lands and provides a total of over 8 miles of hiking trail and other recreational opportunities
Chinsegut Conservation Center	Brooksville	Hernando	Tampa Bay Area	website, cover 408 of the 850 acres comprising Chinsegut Wildlife and Environmental Area, managed by the Florida Fish and Wildlife Conservation Commission
Collier-Seminole State Park	Naples	Collier	Southwest	7,271 acres of mangrove swamp, cypress swamps, salt marshes, mangrove river estuaries, and pine flatwoods, nature center
Conservancy of Southwest Florida Nature Center	Naples	Collier	Southwest	21 acres
Corkscrew Swamp Sanctuary	Naples	Collier	Southwest	Operated by the National Audubon Society, includes the Blair Audubon Center in the 13,000 acre swamp preserve
Crane Point Museum and Nature Center	Marathon	Monroe	South	63 acres, includes the natural history museum, trails, wild bird rehabilitation center
Crowley Natural and Cultural History Center	Sarasota	Sarasota	Southwest	website, 185 acres, includes trails, pioneer museum and historic buildings, wild and farm animals
Crystal Springs Preserve	Crystal Springs	Pasco	Central	525-acre sanctuary with Magnitude 2 spring system, nature center and learning lab
Daggerwing Nature Center	Boca Raton	Palm Beach	South	website, 40 acres, located in South County Regional Park, operated by Palm Beach County Parks & Recreation
Dante Fascell Visitor Center	Homestead	Miami-Dade	Southeast	website, one of several visitor centers for Biscayne National Park, focus is the four ecosystems found in the park, also art gallery
Deerfield Island Park	Deerfield Beach	Broward	South	website, accessible by boat only, 53.3-acre nature-oriented park with guided nature walks, trails, water shuttle
Discovery Center at Tuscawilla Park	Ocala	Marion	Central	Operated by the City of Ocala, environmental and science education
Ed Yarborough Nature Center at Geneva Wilderness Area	Geneva	Seminole	Central	website, 180 acres, operated by the County
Elsa Kimbell Environmental Education and Research Center	Hobe Sound	Martin	Treasure Coast	Located in the 11,500-acre Jonathan Dickinson State Park
Enchanted Forest Sanctuary	Titusville	Brevard	Central	website, 471-acre nature preserve, management & education center features hands-on exhibit room, discovery room
Environmental Center at Miami Dade College	Kendall	Miami-Dade	South	website, 9-acre nature preserve, features a lake, an endangered pine rockland, hammocks, butterfly gardens, native plantings, an organic garden and a variety of animals
Environmental Learning Center	Vero Beach	Indian River	Treasure Coast	website, 64 acres, environment of the Indian River Lagoon
Erna Nixon Park Nature Center	Melbourne	Brevard	Central	54 acres, operated by the County
Fern Forest Nature Center	Coconut Creek	Broward	South	website, operated by the County, 247-acre Designated Urban Wilderness Area
Florida Keys Eco-Discovery Center	Key West	Monroe	South	Native plants and animals of the Florida Keys National Marine Sanctuary, both on land and underwater
Florida Keys Wild Bird Rehabilitation Center	Tavernier	Monroe	South	website, wild bird rehabilitation center, boardwalk trail past aviaries of rescued but unreleasable birds
Florida Museum of Natural History	Gainesville	Alachua	North Central	Exhibits include fossils, butterfly rainforest, recreated southwest Florida mangrove forest and sea grass estuary, area Native Americans, Northwest Florida ecosystems, outdoor wildflower and butterfly garden, trails through 60-acre Natural Area Teaching Lab
Florida Oceanographic Coastal Center	Hutchinson Island	Martin	Treasure Coast	57 acres, focus is Florida's coastal ecosystems
George C. McGough Nature Park	Largo	Pinellas	Tampa Bay Area	website, operated by the City, nature center houses live animal exhibits and hands-on activities for children, outdoor birds of prey
Grassy Waters Preserve	West Palm Beach	Palm Beach	South	website, operated by the City of West Palm Beach, 23 square mile wetlands ecosystem with nature center
Green Cay Nature Center	Boynton Beach	Palm Beach	South	100 acres, operated by the County
Greynolds Park	Miami	Miami-Dade	South	Operated by the County, 249 acres
Guana River Environmental Center	Ponte Vedra Beach	St. Johns	Greater Jacksonville	Exhibits and education about the ecosystem of the Guana Tolomato Matanzas National Estuarine Research Reserve
Gumbo Limbo Nature Center	Boca Raton	Palm Beach	South	20 acres of protected barrier island, operated by the City, includes saltwater tanks displaying different South Florida marine habitats, sea turtle rehabilitation center
Harbor Branch Ocean Discovery Center	Fort Pierce	St. Lucie	Treasure Coast	Exhibits about marine environments and the Harbor Branch Oceanographic Institute at Florida Atlantic University
Hobe Sound Nature Center	Jupiter Island	Martin	Treasure Coast	Provides support for the 1,035-acre Hobe Sound National Wildlife Refuge's volunteer, environmental education, interpretation and visitor services programs
Homer Powell Nature Center	Titusville	Brevard	Central	website, operated by the County in 25-acre Wuesthoff Park
Homosassa Springs Wildlife State Park	Homosassa Springs	Citrus	Tampa Bay Area	Park features manatee observation area
Honeymoon Island State Park	Dunedin	Pinellas	Tampa Bay Area	385 acres, Rotary Centennial Nature Center features exhibits about the natural and cultural history of Honeymoon and Caladesi Islands and an elevated observation deck
Huguenot Memorial Park Nature Center	Jacksonville	Duval	Greater Jacksonville	Visitor center for Huguenot Memorial Park
J. N. "Ding" Darling National Wildlife Refuge	Sanibel	Lee	Southwest	5,200 acres, education center features interactive exhibits on refuge ecosystems, the work of "Ding" Darling, migratory flyways, the National Wildlife Refuge System and a hands-on area for children
Johnnie Johnson Nature Center at Lori Wilson Park	Cocoa Beach	Brevard	Central	website, 32 acres, operated by the County
Ladell Brothers Outdoor Environmental Center	Madison	Madison	North Florida	website, 20 acres, located on the campus of North Florida Community College
Lemon Bay Park and Environmental Center	Englewood	Sarasota	Southwest	210-acre nature-based County park, black mangrove forest, mangrove fringe along the shoreline, pine and scrubby flatwoods, educational classes, guided nature and bird walks
Loggerhead Marinelife Center	Juno Beach	Palm Beach	South	Education center and sea turtle hospital, features live sea turtles, aquaria, displays of local wildlife, educational displays about South Florida's marine environment
Long Key Natural Area & Nature Center	Davie	Broward	South	website, operated by the County, 164.8 acres, exhibits on natural history and area Native Americans, elevated oak hammock, 14-acre orange grove, restored wetland marshes, man-made ponds and canals
Lyonia Environmental Center	Deltona	Volusia	Central	website, located in the Deltona Regional Library complex, adjacent to the 360-acre Lyonia Preserve, operated by the County
Manatee Observation and Education Center	Fort Pierce	St. Lucie	Treasure Coast	website, waterfront environmental education and wildlife viewing center, touch tank, aquaria
Margaret Hames Nature Center	Palm Bay	Brevard	Central	Located in over 100-acre Turkey Creek Sanctuary, operated by the City
Marjory Stoneman Douglas Biscayne Nature Center	Key Biscayne	Miami-Dade	South	Located in the 808-acre Crandon Park, cooperative project of three partners: Miami-Dade County Public Schools, Miami-Dade County Parks and Recreation Department and the not-for-profit community support group
Marine Science Center	Ponce Inlet	Volusia	Central	Operated by the County, includes marine environment exhibits, sea bird and sea turtle rehabilitation
MacArthur Beach State Park	North Palm Beach	Palm Beach	South	225 acres, includes William T. Kirby Nature Center
Moccasin Lake Nature Park	Clearwater	Pinellas	Tampa Bay Area	51 acres, operated by the City
Morningside Nature Center	Gainesville	Alachua	North Central	Operated by the City, 278 acres, includes living history farm
Oakland Nature Preserve	Oakland	Orange	Central	website, 128 acres on Lake Apopka, environmental education center
Okeeheelee Nature Center	West Palm Beach	Palm Beach	South	website, 90 acres, operated by the County
Oscar Scherer State Park Nature Center	Osprey	Sarasota	Southwest	1,400 acres
Oxbow Eco-Center	Port St. Lucie	St. Lucie	Treasure Coast	website, operated by the County, environmental learning center located on a 225-acre preserve
Paynes Prairie Preserve State Park	Micanopy	Alachua	North Central	22,000 acres, exhibits in the visitor center, nature programs
PEAR Park	Leesburg	Lake	Central	website, 268 acres, operated by the County, park includes nature center with a geology lab, trails. demonstration gardens, observation pavilions, viewing blind
Pine Jog Environmental Education Center	West Palm Beach	Palm Beach	South	150 acres, a unit of the College of Education of Florida Atlantic University
Polk's Nature Discovery Center	Lakeland	Polk	Tampa Bay Area	Operated by the County on the 1,267-acre Circle B Bar Reserve
Ridge Audubon Center	Babson Park	Polk	Tampa Bay Area	website, 3 acres, owned by the National Audubon Society, home to the Ridge Audubon Society
River Center	Jupiter	Palm Beach	South	website, operated by the Loxahatchee River District, features live aquatic tanks, interactive exhibits, and a touch tank that represent the river system from a freshwater cypress swamp to seagrass-dominated estuary to marine ecosystems
Riverwalk Park Nature Center	Rockledge	Brevard	Central	website, 6 acres, operated by the County, habitats and animals of the Indian River Lagoon
Rookery Bay National Estuarine Research Reserve	Naples	Collier	Southwest	110,000 acres, features a 2,300-gallon aquarium and interactive exhibits about the park's natural and cultural history
Rotary Park Nature Center	Merritt Island	Brevard	Central	Facebook site, 37 acres, operated by the County
Roy Hyatt Environmental Center	Cantonment	Escambia	Florida Panhandle	website, 120 acres, owned and operated by the Escambia County School District, not open to the public
Sandoway Discovery Center	Delray Beach	Palm Beach	South	Features large shell exhibit, coral reef pool with sharks
Sanibel-Captiva Conservation Foundation Nature Center	Sanibel	Lee	Southwest	website, features a touch tank and exhibits teaching about the ecology of Sanibel and Captiva, 4 miles of trails
Sawgrass Nature Center and Wildlife Hospital	Coral Springs	Broward	South	website, 5 acres, nature center and wildlife rehabilitation hospital
Secret Woods Nature Center	Fort Lauderdale	Broward	South	website, 57 acres, operated by the County
Sense of Wonder Nature Center	Miami	Miami-Dade	South	website, 65 acres, operated by the County in A.D. (Doug) Barnes Park
Shamrock Park and Nature Center	Venice	Sarasota	Southwest	website, over 80 acres, County park, includes 1.2 mile paved multi-use trail
Silver River Museum and Environmental Education Center	Ocala	Marion	Central	Program of the Marion County Public School System, located within the Silver Springs State Park, area cultural and natural history
Street Audubon Nature Center	Winter Haven	Polk	Tampa Bay Area	website, owned by the National Audubon Society, 42 acres, operated by the Lake Region Audubon Society
St. Andrews State Park	Panama City Beach	Bay	Florida Panhandle	1,200 acres, Environmental Interpretive Center features ecosystem dioramas, butterfly, bird egg and sea shell collections, sea turtle nesting exhibit, saltwater aquarium
Tallahassee Museum	Tallahassee	Leon	Florida Panhandle	52 acres, open-air museum, nature discovery center, 1880s period farm, Florida wildlife on outdoor and indoor display
Tampa Bay Watch Discovery Center	St. Petersburg	Pinellas	Tampa Bay Area	Located on the St. Pete Pier
Terramar Education Center	Fort Lauderdale	Broward	South	website, visitor center and educational exhibits for Hugh Taylor Birch State Park
Tree Hill Nature Center	Jacksonville	Duval	Greater Jacksonville	50 acres, features a Florida natural history museum, butterfly and hummingbird gardens, and native animals
Tropical Audubon Society	Miami	Miami-Dade	South	website, Steinberg Nature Center, 3 acres, botanical garden
Trout Lake Nature Center	Eustis	Lake	Central	website, 230 acre wildlife preserve, includes the Charles Newell Hall and Museum and the Environmental Education Center
Water Works Environmental Education Center	Palatka	Putnam	Northeast	Owned by the City, focus is conservation of clean freshwater, open on a limited basis
Weedon Island Preserve	St. Petersburg	Pinellas	Tampa Bay Area	Owned by the County, features the Weedon Island Preserve Cultural and Natural History Center
Wekiwa Springs State Park	Apopka	Orange	Central	7,000 acres, nature center open on weekends
Wildlife Sanctuary of Northwest Florida	Pensacola	Escambia	Florida Panhandle	website, wildlife rehabilitation center
Vera Carter Environmental Center at Tibet-Butler Preserve	Orlando	Orange	Central	website, provides a variety of exhibits and displays; hike on miles of trails and participate in ongoing environmental programs.

== Resources ==
- League of Environmental Educators in Florida
