= List of Pseudobaris species =

This is a list of species in Pseudobaris, a genus of flower weevils in the family Curculionidae.

== Pseudobaris species ==
- Pseudobaris abrupta Champion, G.C., 1909^{c}
- Pseudobaris acutipennis Champion, G.C., 1909^{c}
- Pseudobaris angusta (LeConte, 1868)^{i c b}
- Pseudobaris angustula LeConte, J.L., 1876^{c}
- Pseudobaris anthracina Casey, T.L., 1892^{c}
- Pseudobaris apicalis Champion, G.C., 1909^{c}
- Pseudobaris atitlana Champion, G.C., 1909^{c}
- Pseudobaris biguttata Champion, G.C., 1909^{c}
- Pseudobaris binotata Champion, G.C., 1909^{c}
- Pseudobaris biolleyi Champion, G.C., 1909^{c}
- Pseudobaris boliviana Hustache, A., 1924^{c}
- Pseudobaris brevior Casey, 1920^{i c}
- Pseudobaris caelata Casey, 1892^{i c}
- Pseudobaris californica Casey, 1920^{i c}
- Pseudobaris callosipennis Solari & Solari, 1906^{c}
- Pseudobaris carinipectus Champion, G.C., 1909^{c}
- Pseudobaris carolinae Casey, 1920^{i c}
- Pseudobaris conica Hustache, 1951^{c}
- Pseudobaris connectans Blatchley, 1920^{i c}
- Pseudobaris corvina (Kirsch, T., 1875)^{c}
- Pseudobaris costaricensis Solari & Solari, 1906^{c}
- Pseudobaris costirostris Champion, G.C., 1909^{c}
- Pseudobaris cribripennis Solari & Solari, 1906^{c}
- Pseudobaris cuprea Hustache, 1951^{c}
- Pseudobaris curvipes Hustache, 1951^{c}
- Pseudobaris cylindricollis Casey, 1922^{c}
- Pseudobaris dentipes Champion, G.C., 1909^{c}
- Pseudobaris discreta Casey, 1892^{i c}
- Pseudobaris disparilis Champion, G.C., 1909^{c}
- Pseudobaris diversa Champion, G.C., 1909^{c}
- Pseudobaris dividua Champion, G.C., 1909^{c}
- Pseudobaris farcta (LeConte, 1868)^{i c b}
- Pseudobaris fasciculata Champion, G.C., 1909^{c}
- Pseudobaris fausta Casey, 1892^{i c}
- Pseudobaris femoralis Hustache, 1951^{c}
- Pseudobaris fraterculus Champion, G.C., 1909^{c}
- Pseudobaris gibbicollis Champion, G.C., 1909^{c}
- Pseudobaris gibbirostris Casey, 1920^{i c}
- Pseudobaris gigantea Solari & Solari, 1906^{c}
- Pseudobaris glabripennis Champion, G.C., 1909^{c}
- Pseudobaris grandis Hustache, 1951^{c}
- Pseudobaris guttifer Champion, G.C., 1909^{c}
- Pseudobaris ibaguena Hustache, 1951^{c}
- Pseudobaris illini Casey, 1920^{i c}
- Pseudobaris irregularis Champion, G.C., 1909^{c}
- Pseudobaris kansana Casey, 1920^{i c}
- Pseudobaris kirschi Hustache, 1951^{c}
- Pseudobaris leucostigma Champion, G.C., 1909^{c}
- Pseudobaris levettei Casey, 1920^{i c}
- Pseudobaris longicollis Hustache, 1951^{c}
- Pseudobaris lucens Champion, G.C., 1909^{c}
- Pseudobaris lucida Champion, G.C., 1909^{c}
- Pseudobaris luctuosa Casey, 1892^{i c}
- Pseudobaris lugubris Casey, 1892^{i g}
- Pseudobaris lustrans Casey, 1920^{c}
- Pseudobaris minuscula Champion, G.C., 1909^{c}
- Pseudobaris minuta Hustache, 1924^{c}
- Pseudobaris missouriana Casey, 1920^{i c}
- Pseudobaris multiguttata Champion, G.C., 1909^{c}
- Pseudobaris mutabilis Champion, G.C., 1909^{c}
- Pseudobaris naevius Champion, G.C., 1909^{c}
- Pseudobaris nigrina (Say, 1831)^{i c b}
- Pseudobaris niveoguttata Champion, G.C., 1909^{c}
- Pseudobaris notata Champion, G.C., 1909^{c}
- Pseudobaris ocellata Solari & Solari, 1906^{c}
- Pseudobaris octonotata Champion, G.C., 1909^{c}
- Pseudobaris oscillans Champion, G.C., 1909^{c}
- Pseudobaris oscitans Casey, 1920^{i c}
- Pseudobaris ovalipennis Hustache, 1924^{c}
- Pseudobaris parallelopennis Solari & Solari, 1906^{c}
- Pseudobaris pectoralis LeConte, 1876^{i c b}
- Pseudobaris perexigua Champion, G.C., 1909^{c}
- Pseudobaris plicata Champion, G.C., 1909^{c}
- Pseudobaris porcina Casey, 1920^{i c}
- Pseudobaris providens Casey, 1920^{i c}
- Pseudobaris puncticollis Champion, G.C., 1909^{c}
- Pseudobaris pusilla LeConte, J.L., 1876^{c}
- Pseudobaris rabida Casey, 1920^{i c}
- Pseudobaris rugipennis Champion, G.C., 1909^{c}
- Pseudobaris santacrucis Hustache, 1924^{c}
- Pseudobaris satyrica Casey, 1920^{i c}
- Pseudobaris scabrida Champion, G.C., 1909^{c}
- Pseudobaris scaeva Casey, 1920^{i c}
- Pseudobaris senescens Champion, G.C., 1909^{c}
- Pseudobaris sexguttata Champion, G.C., 1909^{c}
- Pseudobaris sinuosa Champion, G.C., 1909^{c}
- Pseudobaris sobrina Blatchley, 1916^{i c b}
- Pseudobaris sonomae Casey, 1920^{i c}
- Pseudobaris stigmatica Solari & Solari, 1906^{c}
- Pseudobaris subcaudata Champion, G.C., 1909^{c}
- Pseudobaris sublineata Champion, G.C., 1909^{c}
- Pseudobaris subopaca Hustache, 1951^{c}
- Pseudobaris subparallela Champion, G.C., 1909^{c}
- Pseudobaris subrugosa Champion, G.C., 1909^{c}
- Pseudobaris subscabrosa Champion, G.C., 1909^{c}
- Pseudobaris suturalis Champion, G.C., 1909^{c}
- Pseudobaris tibialis Champion, G.C., 1909^{c}
- Pseudobaris tradita Casey, 1920^{i c}
- Pseudobaris undulata Casey, 1922^{c}
- Pseudobaris vacunalis Casey, 1920^{i c}
- Pseudobaris vafra Casey, 1920^{i c}
- Pseudobaris verecunda Casey, 1920^{i c}

Data sources: i = ITIS, c = Catalogue of Life, g = GBIF, b = Bugguide.net
