= Lake Hancock =

Lake Hancock may refer to one of the following:

- Lake Hancock (Florida)
- Lake Hancock (Washington)
