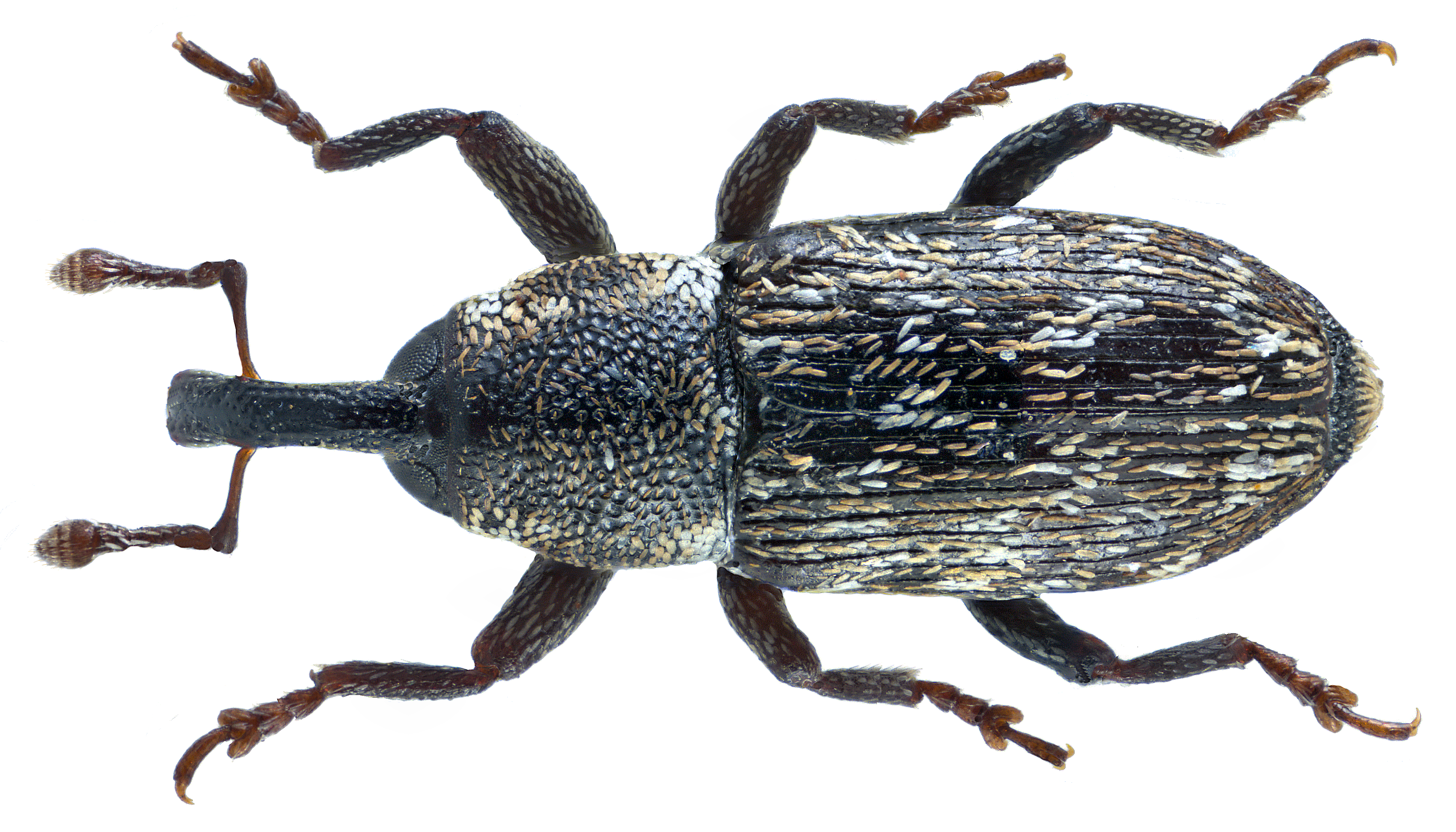
- Cosmobaris scolopacea

Scientific classification
- Domain: Eukaryota
- Kingdom: Animalia
- Phylum: Arthropoda
- Class: Insecta
- Order: Coleoptera
- Suborder: Polyphaga
- Infraorder: Cucujiformia
- Family: Curculionidae
- Subfamily: Baridinae
- Tribe: Baridini; Schoenherr, 1836

= Baridini =

Tribe of beetles

Baridini is a tribe of flower weevils in the family Curculionidae. There are about 16 genera and at least 40 described species in Baridini.

== Genera ==
- Aulacobaris Desbrochers, 1892
- Aulobaris LeConte, 1876
- Baris Germar, 1817
- Cosmobaris Casey, 1920
- Desmoglyptus Casey, 1892
- Eurhinus
- Hesperobaris Casey, 1892
- Microbaris Casey, 1892
- Orthoris LeConte, 1876
- Plesiobaris Casey, 1892
- Pseudobaris LeConte, 1876
- Pycnobaris Casey, 1892
- Rhoptobaris LeConte, 1876
- Stenobaris Linell, 1897
- Trepobaris Casey, 1892
- Trichobaris LeConte, 1876
