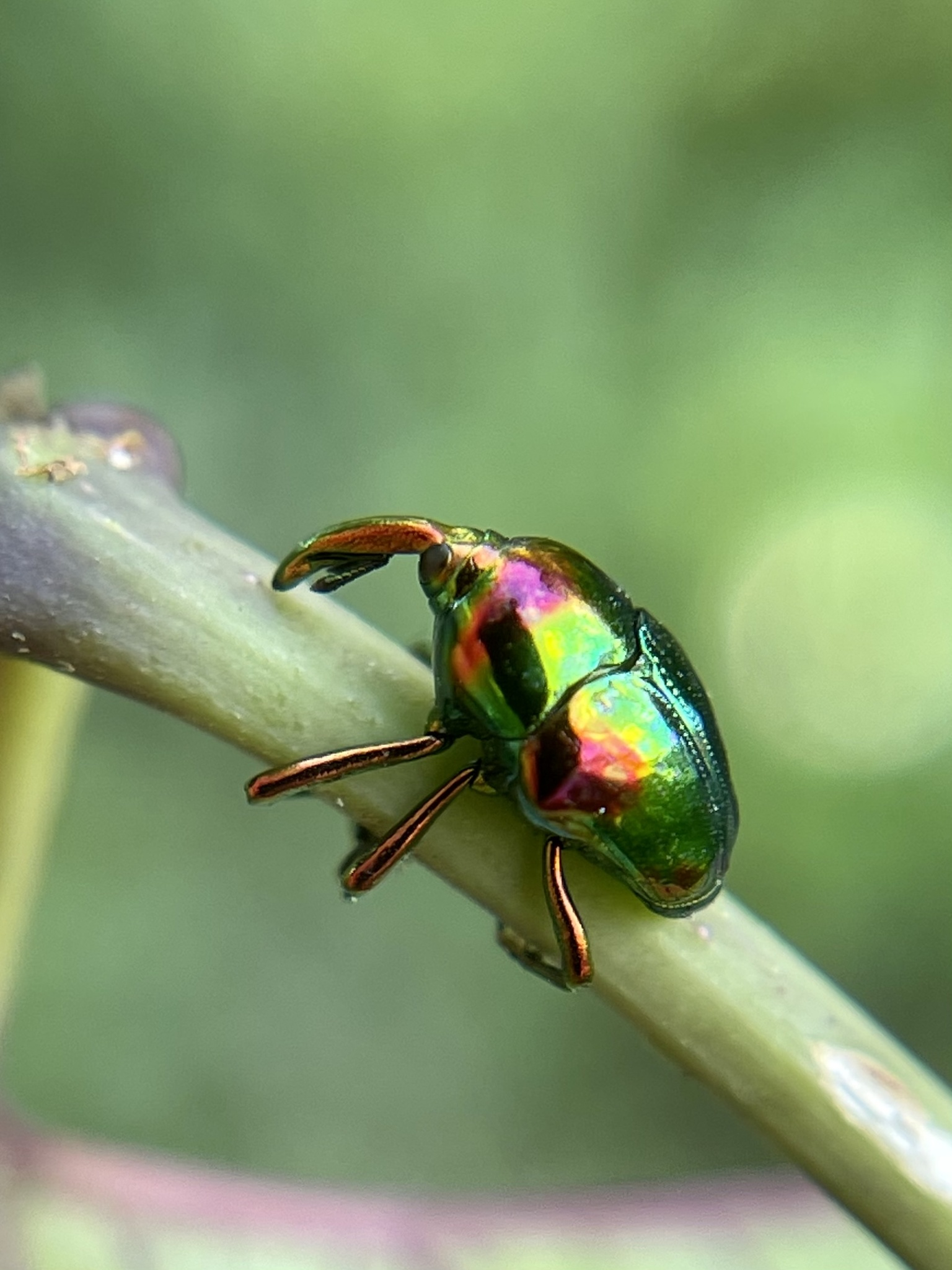

Scientific classification
- Kingdom: Animalia
- Phylum: Arthropoda
- Clade: Pancrustacea
- Class: Insecta
- Order: Coleoptera
- Suborder: Polyphaga
- Infraorder: Cucujiformia
- Family: Eurhynchidae
- Genus: Eurhinus
- Species: E. magnificus

Binomial name
- Eurhinus magnificus L.Gyllenhal, 1836

= Eurhinus magnificus =

Species of beetle

Eurhinus magnificus, the jewel weevil, is a species of weevil native to Central America. The species was originally described by Leonard Gyllenhaal in 1836.

Eurhinus magnificus has also been referred to as the iridescent weevil, and (possibly incorrectly) as the green immigrant leaf weevil.

== Description ==
Eurhinus magnificus is brilliantly coloured. Adults are approximately 5–6 mm long and 3–4 mm wide. Its host plant is Cissus verticillata.

== Range ==
Early descriptions from 1909 indicate that Eurhinus magnificus does not extend south of Nicaragua, however observations aggregated in GBIF suggest that the species moved more south towards Panama. According to the same records, the species has also been observed in Florida. The species might have been introduced to Florida through banana shipments from Costa Rica.

The first sighting of the jewel weevil in Florida is possible to have occurred on February 4, 2010, in the Conservancy of SW Florida Butterfly Garden in Naples. Another early Florida sighting occurred only a few days later at a park in central Pinellas County.
