= Rhoptobaris scolopax =

Scientific classification
- Kingdom: Animalia
- Phylum: Arthropoda
- Class: Insecta
- Order: Coleoptera
- Suborder: Polyphaga
- Infraorder: Cucujiformia
- Family: Curculionidae
- Genus: Rhoptobaris
- Species: R. scolopax

Binomial name
- Rhoptobaris scolopax (Say, 1832)

Synonyms
- Orthoris angustula Casey, 1920; Orthoris captiosa Casey, 1920; Orthoris crotchii LeConte, 1876; Orthoris robustula Casey, 1920; Orthoris tenuirostris Casey, 1920; Orthoris tumidirostris Casey, 1920

Species of beetle

Rhoptobaris scolopax is a North American species of flower weevil in the beetle family Curculionidae. Because the type specimen once was considered lost, authors erroneously applied the name to a species of Aulobaris.
