= Fort Fraser Trail =

Paved path in Florida, US

- Length: 7.75 mi (12.47 km)
- Location: Florida
- Trailheads: South: 27.9056°N 81.8393°W; North Wilson Avenue, Bartow, Florida; North: 27.9967°N 81.8986°W; Winter Lake Road, Eaton Park, Florida
- Elevation change: 9 feet
- Season: Year round
- Surface: Asphalt

The Fort Fraser Trail is a 7.75 miles (12.47 km) paved multi-use path that runs from Bartow to Lakeland. It runs along a former Atlantic Coast Line Railroad line that once ran from Lakeland to Naples. The southern terminus of the trail can be accessed from North Wilson Avenue in Bartow, immediately north of Tractor Supply Company. The northern terminus is at the entrance to the Polk State College (Lakeland) campus in Lakeland.

A .5 miles (0.80 km) paved extension of the trail runs to the Circle B Bar Reserve in Lakeland, a park run by Polk County, the Southwest Florida Water Management District, and the State of Florida, where an additional 3.5 miles (5.6 km)s of unpaved trails traverse the property and provide access to Lake Hancock. Most of the trail parallel's US Highway 98, and numerous benches, shelters, water fountains and other amenities are available.

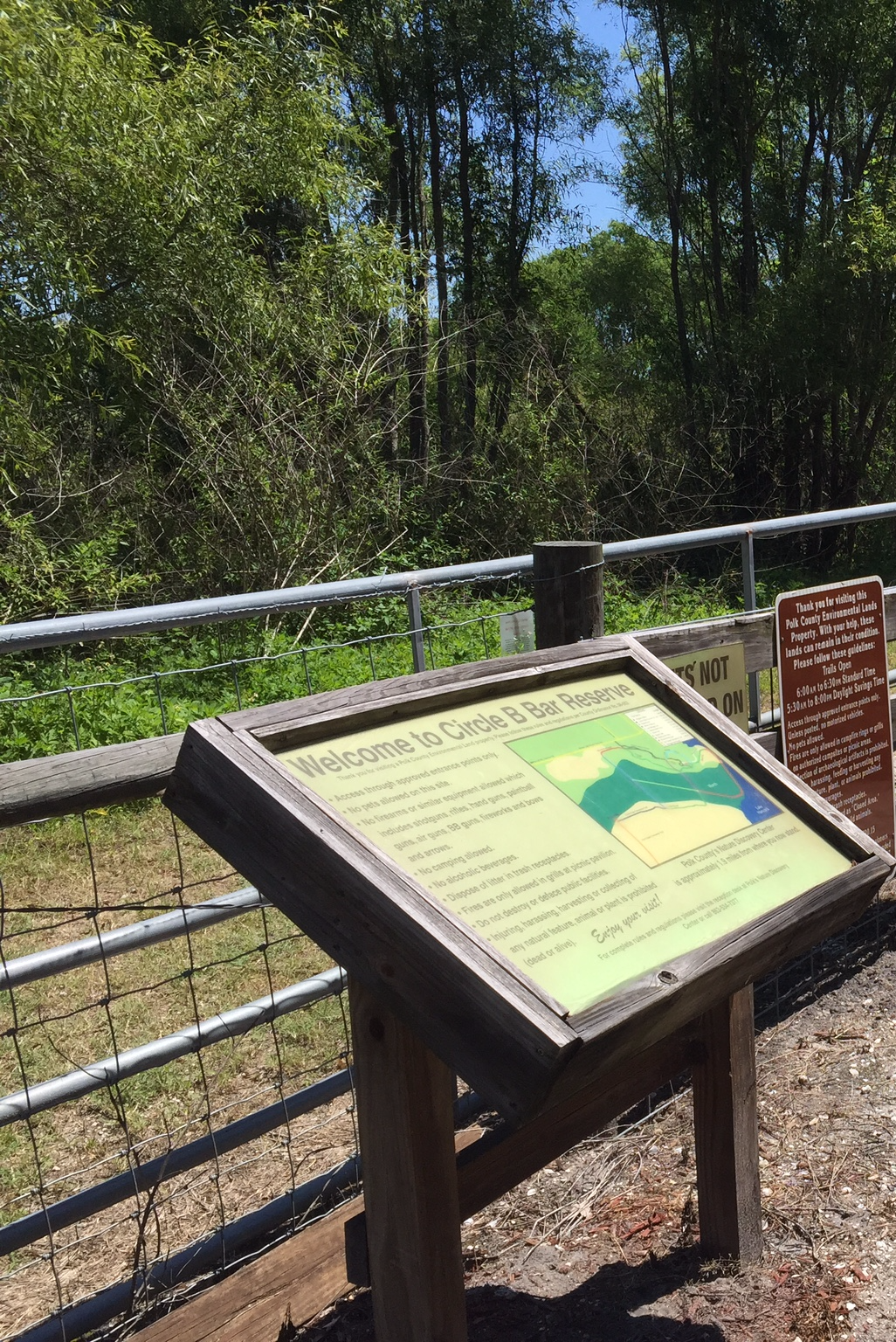

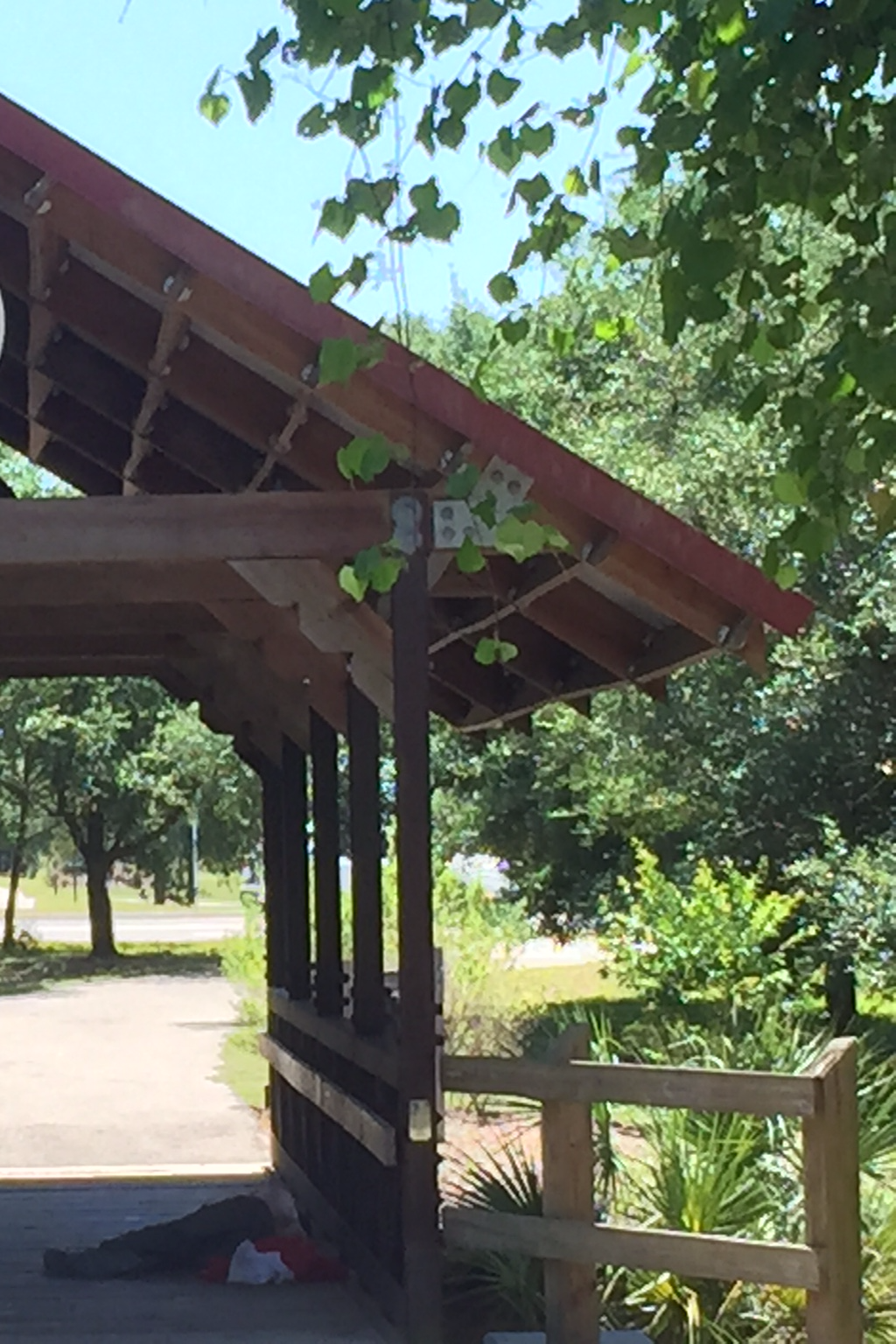

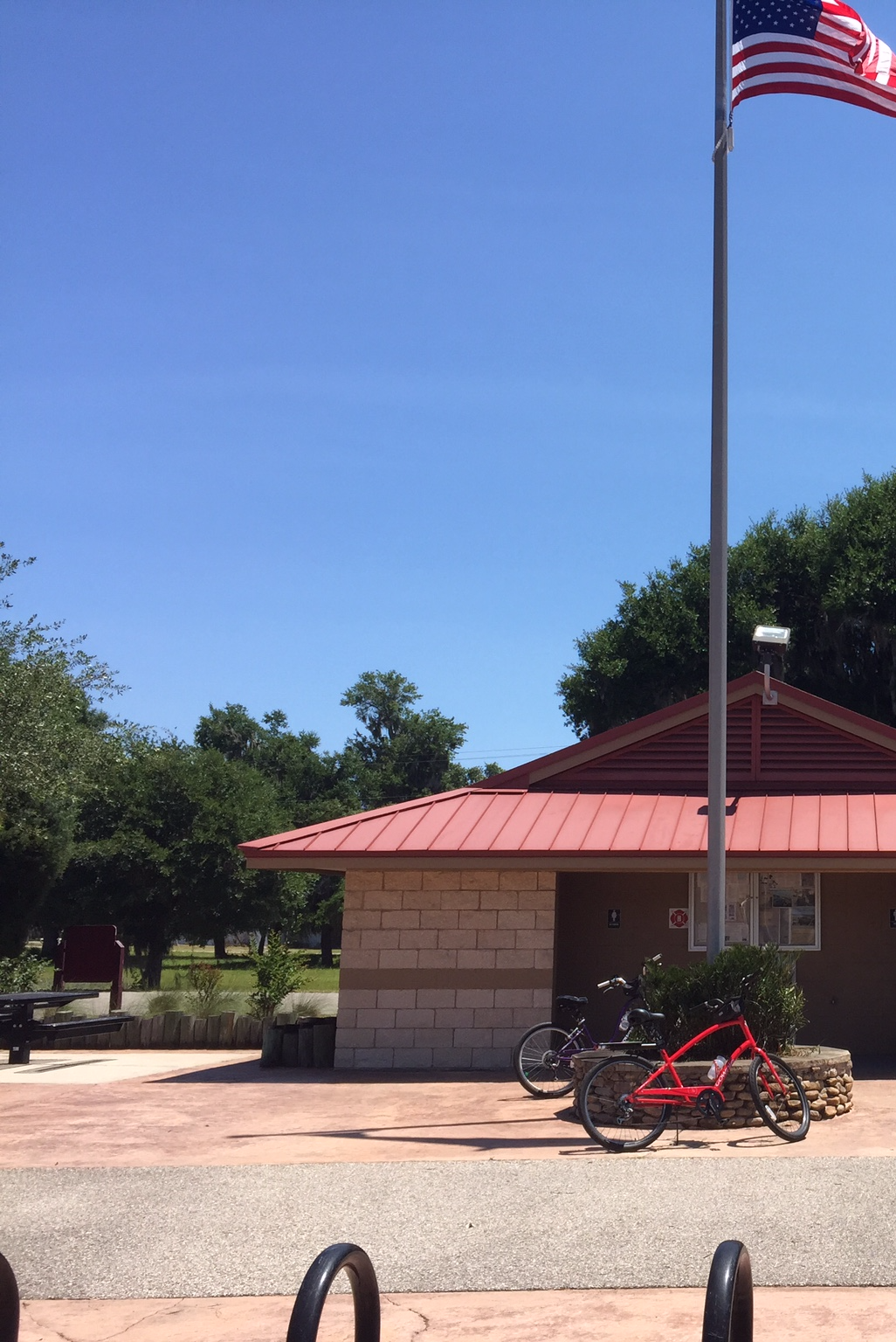
