= Trepobaris =

Scientific classification
- Kingdom: Animalia
- Phylum: Arthropoda
- Class: Insecta
- Order: Coleoptera
- Suborder: Polyphaga
- Infraorder: Cucujiformia
- Family: Curculionidae
- Tribe: Baridini
- Genus: Trepobaris; Casey, 1892

Genus of beetles

Trepobaris is a genus of flower weevils in the beetle family Curculionidae. There are at least four described species in Trepobaris.

== Species ==
These four species belong to the genus Trepobaris:

- Trepobaris elongata Casey, 1892
- Trepobaris inornata Champion & G.C., 1909
- Trepobaris perlonga Champion & G.C., 1909
- Trepobaris yucatana Champion & G.C., 1909
