= Desmoglyptus =

Scientific classification
- Kingdom: Animalia
- Phylum: Arthropoda
- Class: Insecta
- Order: Coleoptera
- Suborder: Polyphaga
- Infraorder: Cucujiformia
- Family: Curculionidae
- Tribe: Baridini
- Genus: Desmoglyptus; Casey, 1892

Genus of beetles

Desmoglyptus is a genus of flower weevils in the beetle family Curculionidae. There are at least two described species in Desmoglyptus.

== Species ==
These two species belong to the genus Desmoglyptus:

- Desmoglyptus arizonicus Casey, 1920
- Desmoglyptus crenatus (LeConte, 1876)
