= Plesiobaris =

Scientific classification
- Kingdom: Animalia
- Phylum: Arthropoda
- Class: Insecta
- Order: Coleoptera
- Suborder: Polyphaga
- Infraorder: Cucujiformia
- Family: Curculionidae
- Tribe: Baridini
- Genus: Plesiobaris; Casey, 1892

Genus of beetles

Plesiobaris is a genus of flower weevils in the beetle family Curculionidae. There are about seven described species in Plesiobaris.

== Species ==
These seven species belong to the genus Plesiobaris:

- Plesiobaris aemula Casey, 1892
- Plesiobaris albilata (LeConte, 1876)
- Plesiobaris connectans Blatchley & W.S., 1920
- Plesiobaris disjuncta Casey, 1892
- Plesiobaris rufina Casey, 1920
- Plesiobaris signatipes Casey, 1892
- Plesiobaris t-signum (Boheman, 1844)
