= Desmoglyptus arizonicus =

Scientific classification
- Kingdom: Animalia
- Phylum: Arthropoda
- Class: Insecta
- Order: Coleoptera
- Suborder: Polyphaga
- Infraorder: Cucujiformia
- Family: Curculionidae
- Genus: Desmoglyptus
- Species: D. arizonicus

Binomial name
- Desmoglyptus arizonicus Casey, 1920

Species of beetle

Desmoglyptus arizonicus is a species of flower weevil in the beetle family Curculionidae. It is found in North America.
