= Pseudobaris pectoralis =

Scientific classification
- Kingdom: Animalia
- Phylum: Arthropoda
- Class: Insecta
- Order: Coleoptera
- Suborder: Polyphaga
- Infraorder: Cucujiformia
- Family: Curculionidae
- Genus: Pseudobaris
- Species: P. pectoralis

Binomial name
- Pseudobaris pectoralis LeConte, 1876

Species of beetle

Pseudobaris pectoralis is a species of flower weevil in the beetle family Curculionidae. It is found in North America.
