= Rhoptobaris =

Scientific classification
- Kingdom: Animalia
- Phylum: Arthropoda
- Class: Insecta
- Order: Coleoptera
- Suborder: Polyphaga
- Infraorder: Cucujiformia
- Family: Curculionidae
- Tribe: Baridini
- Genus: Rhoptobaris; LeConte, 1876

Synonyms
- Orthoris LeConte, 1876

Genus of beetles

Rhoptobaris is a genus of flower weevils in the beetle family Curculionidae. There are about five described species in Rhoptobaris.

== Species ==
These five species belong to the genus Rhoptobaris:

- Rhoptobaris canescens LeConte, 1876
- Rhoptobaris cylindrifera (Casey, 1892)
- Rhoptobaris obrieni Prena, 2012
- Rhoptobaris piercei Prena, 2012
- Rhoptobaris scolopax (Say, 1832)
