= Hesperobaris =

Scientific classification
- Kingdom: Animalia
- Phylum: Arthropoda
- Class: Insecta
- Order: Coleoptera
- Suborder: Polyphaga
- Infraorder: Cucujiformia
- Family: Curculionidae
- Tribe: Baridini
- Genus: Hesperobaris; Casey, 1892

Synonyms
- Litobaris Champion, 1909

Genus of beetles

Hesperobaris is a genus of flower weevils in the beetle family Curculionidae, with currently one described species in North America.

== Species ==
- Hesperobaris suavis Casey, 1892
