= Hesperobaris suavis =

Scientific classification
- Kingdom: Animalia
- Phylum: Arthropoda
- Class: Insecta
- Order: Coleoptera
- Suborder: Polyphaga
- Infraorder: Cucujiformia
- Family: Curculionidae
- Genus: Hesperobaris
- Species: H. suavis

Binomial name
- Hesperobaris suavis Casey, 1892

Synonyms
- Litobaris subpruinosa Champion, 1909; Baris esuriens Casey, 1920; Hesperobaris ovulum Casey, 1920

Species of beetle

Hesperobaris suavis is a species of flower weevil in the beetle family Curculionidae. It is found in North America.
