= Pseudobaris farcta =

Scientific classification
- Domain: Eukaryota
- Kingdom: Animalia
- Phylum: Arthropoda
- Class: Insecta
- Order: Coleoptera
- Suborder: Polyphaga
- Infraorder: Cucujiformia
- Family: Curculionidae
- Genus: Pseudobaris
- Species: P. farcta

Binomial name
- Pseudobaris farcta (LeConte, 1868)

Species of beetle

Pseudobaris farcta is a species of flower weevil in the beetle family Curculionidae. It is found in North America.
