= Pseudobaris angusta =

Scientific classification
- Domain: Eukaryota
- Kingdom: Animalia
- Phylum: Arthropoda
- Class: Insecta
- Order: Coleoptera
- Suborder: Polyphaga
- Infraorder: Cucujiformia
- Family: Curculionidae
- Genus: Pseudobaris
- Species: P. angusta

Binomial name
- Pseudobaris angusta (LeConte, 1868)

Synonyms
- Pseudobaris angustula LeConte, 1876

Species of beetle

Pseudobaris angusta is a species of flower weevil in the beetle family Curculionidae. It is found in North America.
