= Aulobaris anthracina =

Scientific classification
- Kingdom: Animalia
- Phylum: Arthropoda
- Class: Insecta
- Order: Coleoptera
- Suborder: Polyphaga
- Infraorder: Cucujiformia
- Family: Curculionidae
- Genus: Aulobaris
- Species: A. anthracina

Binomial name
- Aulobaris anthracina (Boheman, 1836)

Synonyms
- Baridius ibis LeConte, 1869

Species of beetle

Aulobaris anthracina is a species of flower weevil in the beetle family Curculionidae. It is found in North America.
