= Microbaris =

Scientific classification
- Kingdom: Animalia
- Phylum: Arthropoda
- Class: Insecta
- Order: Coleoptera
- Suborder: Polyphaga
- Infraorder: Cucujiformia
- Family: Curculionidae
- Tribe: Baridini
- Genus: Microbaris; Casey, 1892

Genus of beetles

Microbaris is a genus of flower weevils in the beetle family Curculionidae. There is one described species in Microbaris, M. galvestonica.
