= Plesiobaris disjuncta =

Scientific classification
- Kingdom: Animalia
- Phylum: Arthropoda
- Class: Insecta
- Order: Coleoptera
- Suborder: Polyphaga
- Infraorder: Cucujiformia
- Family: Curculionidae
- Genus: Plesiobaris
- Species: P. disjuncta

Binomial name
- Plesiobaris disjuncta Casey, 1892

Species of beetle

Plesiobaris disjuncta is a species of flower weevil in the beetle family Curculionidae. It is found in North America.
