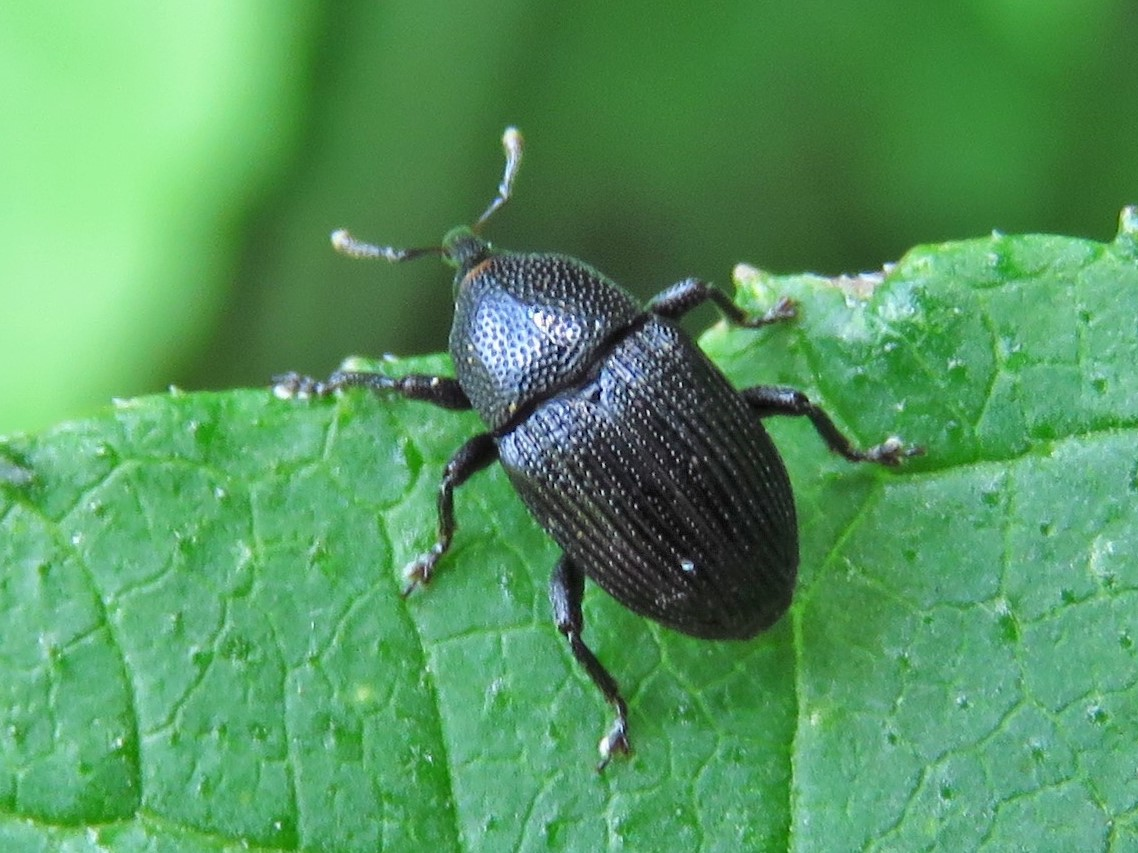

Scientific classification
- Kingdom: Animalia
- Phylum: Arthropoda
- Class: Insecta
- Order: Coleoptera
- Suborder: Polyphaga
- Infraorder: Cucujiformia
- Family: Curculionidae
- Genus: Trepobaris
- Species: T. elongata

Binomial name
- Trepobaris elongata Casey, 1892

= Trepobaris elongata =

Species of beetle

Trepobaris elongata is a species of flower weevil in the beetle family Curculionidae. It is found in North America.
