= Stenobaris =

Scientific classification
- Domain: Eukaryota
- Kingdom: Animalia
- Phylum: Arthropoda
- Class: Insecta
- Order: Coleoptera
- Suborder: Polyphaga
- Infraorder: Cucujiformia
- Family: Curculionidae
- Tribe: Baridini
- Genus: Stenobaris; Linell, 1897

Genus of beetles

Stenobaris is a genus of flower weevils in the beetle family Curculionidae. There is one described species in Stenobaris, S. avicenniae.
