= Pycnobaris nigrostriata =

Scientific classification
- Domain: Eukaryota
- Kingdom: Animalia
- Phylum: Arthropoda
- Class: Insecta
- Order: Coleoptera
- Suborder: Polyphaga
- Infraorder: Cucujiformia
- Family: Curculionidae
- Genus: Pycnobaris
- Species: P. nigrostriata

Binomial name
- Pycnobaris nigrostriata Fall, 1913

Species of beetle

Pycnobaris nigrostriata is a species of flower weevil in the beetle family Curculionidae.
