= Aulobaris naso =

Scientific classification
- Kingdom: Animalia
- Phylum: Arthropoda
- Class: Insecta
- Order: Coleoptera
- Suborder: Polyphaga
- Infraorder: Cucujiformia
- Family: Curculionidae
- Genus: Aulobaris
- Species: A. naso

Binomial name
- Aulobaris naso LeConte, 1876

Synonyms
- Baridius nasutus LeConte, 1869 (not LeConte, 1860)

Species of beetle

Aulobaris naso is a species of flower weevil in the beetle family Curculionidae. It is found in North America.
