= Plesiobaris t-signum =

Scientific classification
- Kingdom: Animalia
- Phylum: Arthropoda
- Class: Insecta
- Order: Coleoptera
- Suborder: Polyphaga
- Infraorder: Cucujiformia
- Family: Curculionidae
- Genus: Plesiobaris
- Species: P. t-signum

Binomial name
- Plesiobaris t-signum (Boheman, 1844)

Species of beetle

Plesiobaris t-signum is a species of flower weevil in the beetle family Curculionidae. It is found in North America.
