= Pseudobaris sobrina =

Scientific classification
- Domain: Eukaryota
- Kingdom: Animalia
- Phylum: Arthropoda
- Class: Insecta
- Order: Coleoptera
- Suborder: Polyphaga
- Infraorder: Cucujiformia
- Family: Curculionidae
- Genus: Pseudobaris
- Species: P. sobrina

Binomial name
- Pseudobaris sobrina Blatchley, 1916

Species of beetle

Pseudobaris sobrina is a species of flower weevil in the beetle family Curculionidae. It is found in North America.
