= Bay City Walking Dredge =

- U.S. National Register of Historic Places
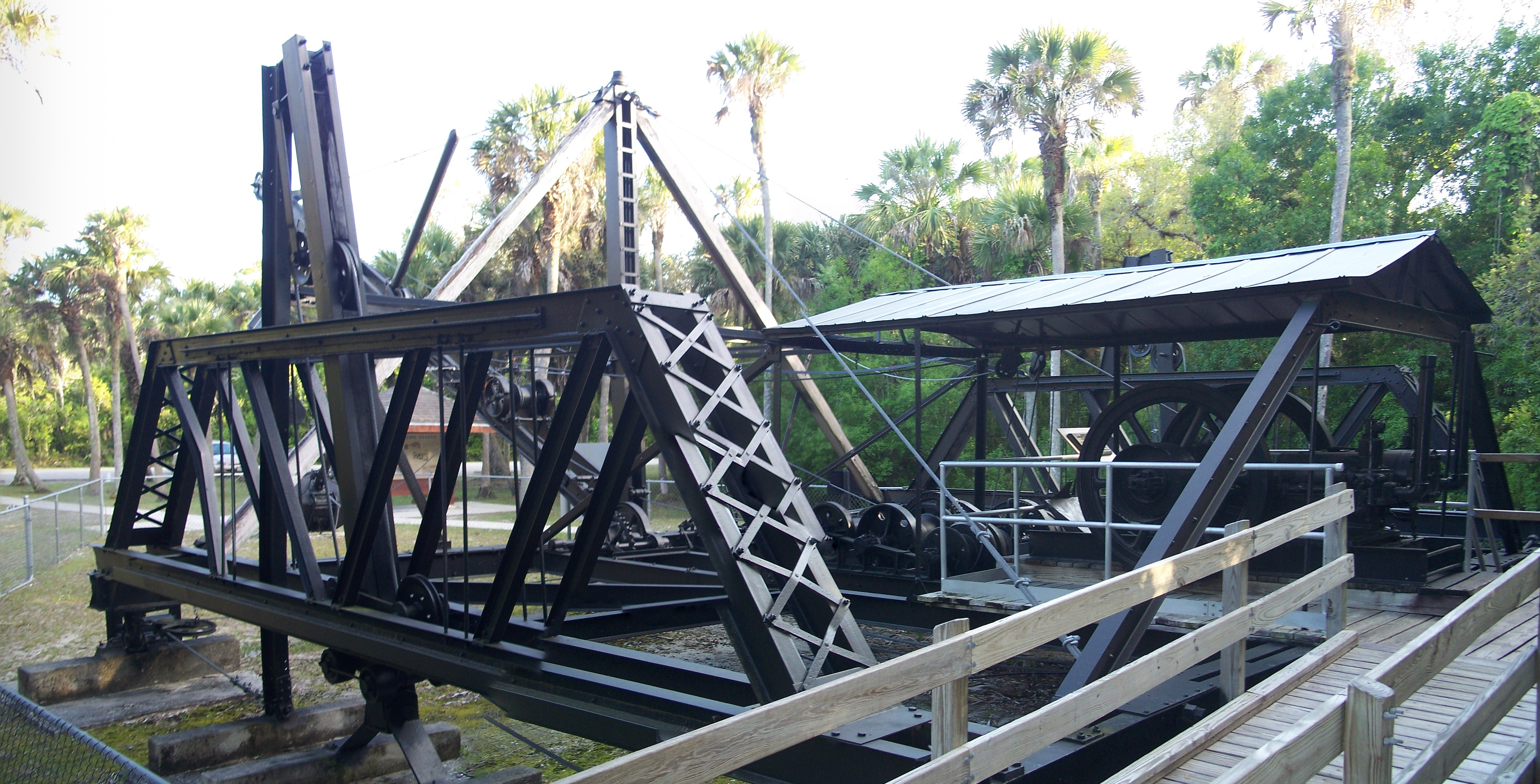

- Location within Florida Location within the United States
- Location: Naples, Florida
- Coordinates: 25.991839°N 81.593211°W
- Built: 1924
- NRHP reference No.: 13000318
- Added to NRHP: May 29, 2013

The Bay City Walking Dredge is a historic structure in Collier County, Florida. It was built in 1924 and declared a National Historic Mechanical Engineering Landmark in 1994. It was added to the National Register of Historic Places on May 29, 2013. It is located at 20200 E. Tamiami Trail in the vicinity of Naples, Florida at Collier-Seminole State Park. The dredge was built by Bay City Dredge Works of Bay City, Michigan and was used to construct part of the Tamiami Trail.

== See also ==
- National Register of Historic Places listings in Collier County, Florida
