= Pycnobaris =

Scientific classification
- Kingdom: Animalia
- Phylum: Arthropoda
- Class: Insecta
- Order: Coleoptera
- Suborder: Polyphaga
- Infraorder: Cucujiformia
- Family: Curculionidae
- Tribe: Baridini
- Genus: Pycnobaris; Casey, 1892

Genus of beetles

Pycnobaris is a genus of flower weevils in the beetle family Curculionidae. There are about five described species in Pycnobaris.

== Species ==
These five species belong to the genus Pycnobaris:

- Pycnobaris canonica Casey, 1920
- Pycnobaris nigrostriata Fall, 1913
- Pycnobaris nigrostriatus Fall, 1913
- Pycnobaris pruinosa (LeConte, 1876)
- Pycnobaris squamotecta Casey, 1892
