= Palatka Water Works =

Former water pumping facility in Palatka, Florida

- U.S. National Register of Historic Places
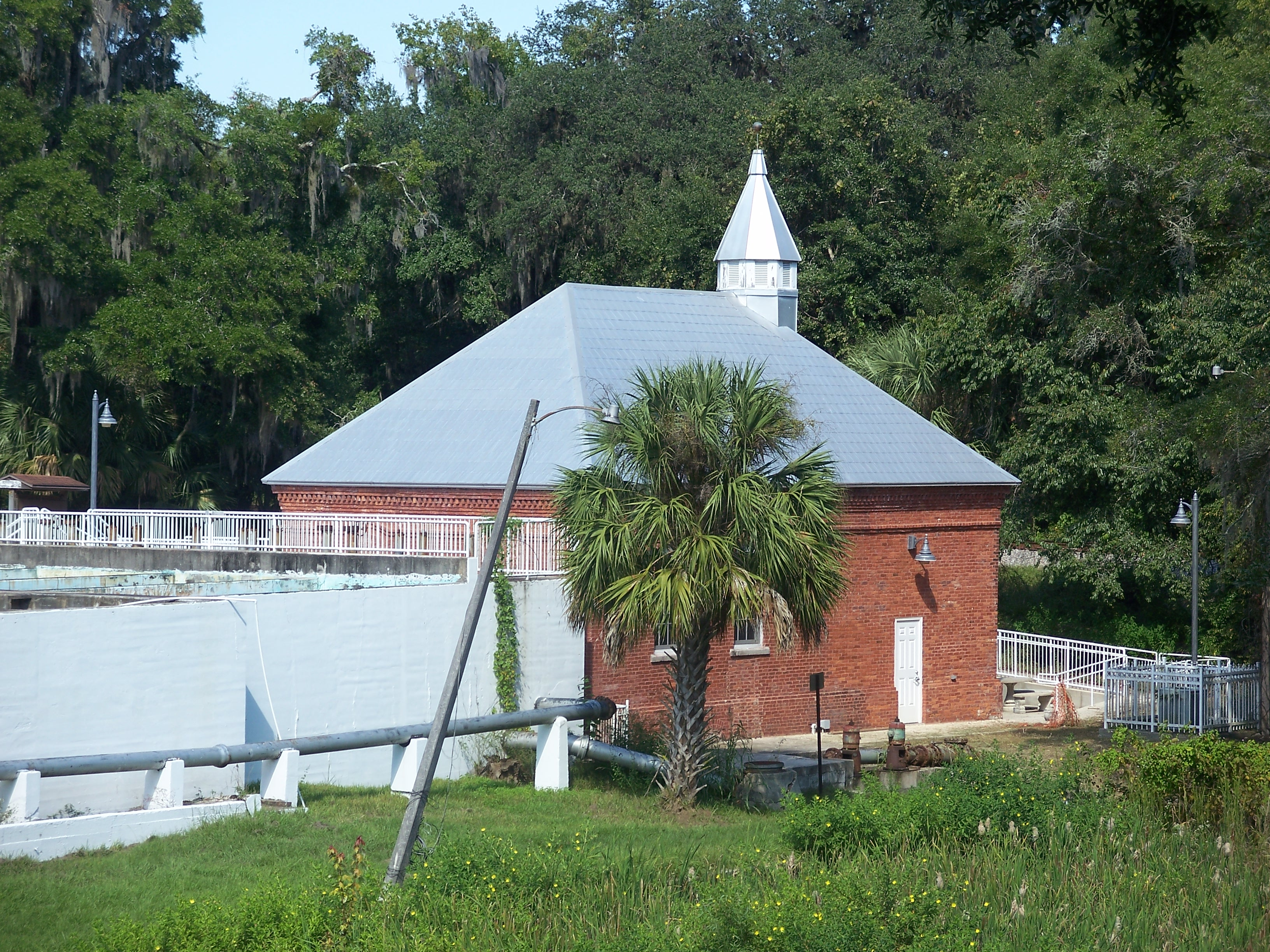

- Location within Florida Location within the United States
- Location: 1101 Whitewater Dr; Palatka, Florida
- Coordinates: 29°38′59″N 81°37′47″W
- NRHP reference No.: 100008739
- Added to NRHP: 13 March 2023

Palatka Water Works is a former water pumping facility in Palatka, Florida. Built in 1886, this building provided residents with fresh water for more than 100 years. Today the building houses the Water Works Environmental Education Center. The center is used for educational school programs and community events. Trained volunteers from the St. Johns River Water Management District's Watershed Action Volunteer Program conduct programs for school children and adults to educate them about water resources, focusing on water conservation and protecting the St. Johns River. On March 13, 2023, it was added to the U.S. National Register of Historic Places.
