= Rookery Bay National Estuarine Research Reserve =

Protected mangrove estuary in Florida, United States

Coordinates: 25.971621°N 81.7350°W

Rookery Bay National Estuarine Research Reserve protects 110,000 acres of coastal lands and waters at the northern end of the Ten Thousand Islands on the gulf coast of Florida, representing one of the few remaining undisturbed mangrove estuaries in North America.

Its ecosystem is a prime example of a nearly pristine subtropical mangrove forested estuary. It is located in the West Florida subregion of the West Indian Biogeographic Region.

== History ==
A 10-mile loop road through Rookery Bay was proposed in 1963 which would have facilitated vast coastal development around Rookery Bay. The Collier County Conservancy, the Nature Conservancy, the Collier Audubon Society, and a number of private investors, began a grass roots effort which resulted in the purchase of 3,362 acres which eventually became the Rookery Bay National Estuarine Sanctuary, with official designation by the National Oceanic and Atmospheric Administration in 1980. Shortly thereafter, the name was changed to Rookery Bay National Estuarine Research Reserve.

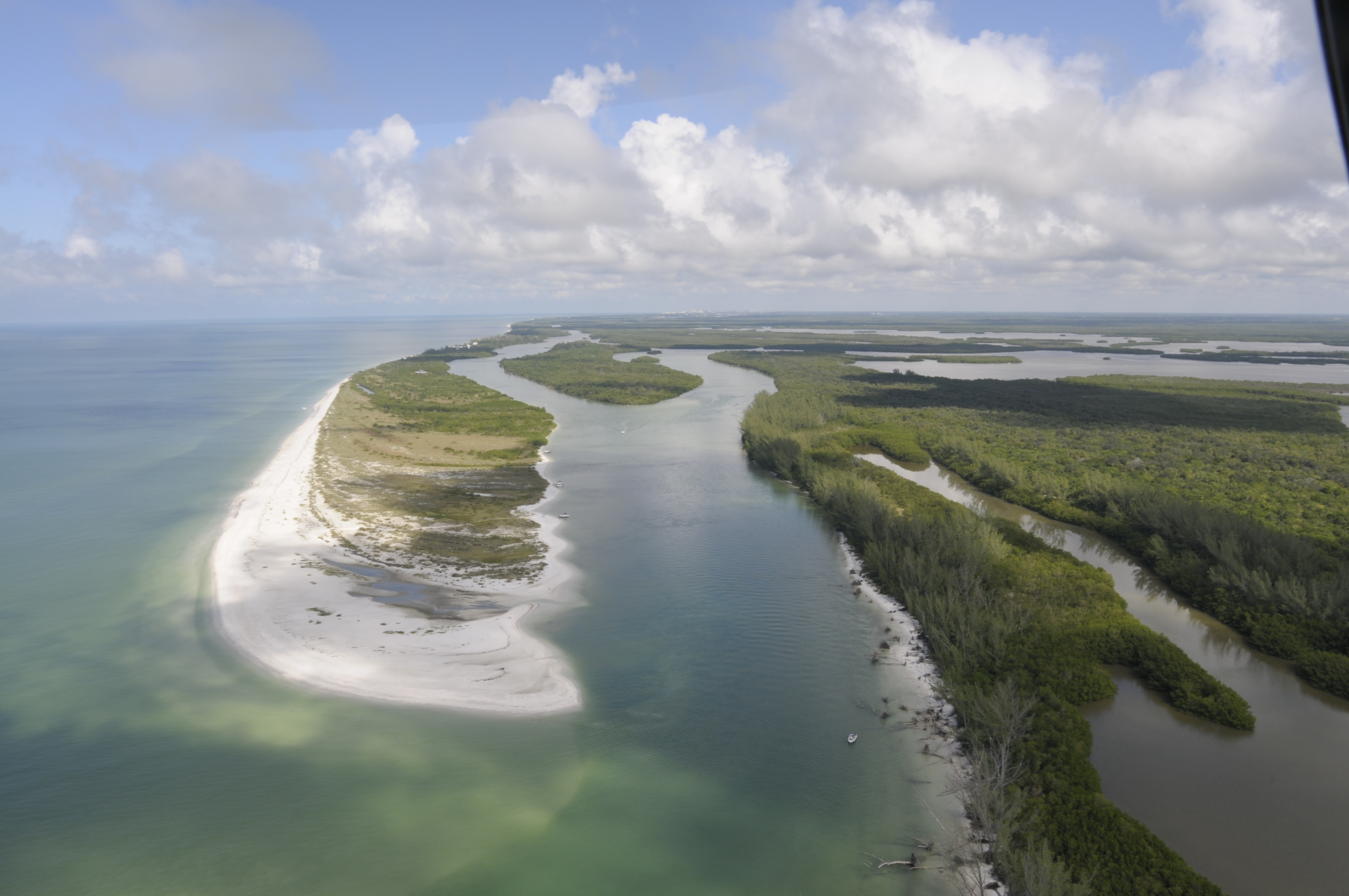
Aerial view of an island in Rookery Bay

== Activities ==
Friends of Rookery Bay is a non-profit organization that supports the reserve's fundraising goals. Many of Rookery Bay's research and resource management projects are completed by volunteers. Team OCEAN is a volunteer partnership between Rookery Bay National Estuarine Research Reserve, Florida Sea Grant and other community contributors that follows the model set at the Florida Keys National Marine Sanctuary. The Team OCEAN volunteers frequently visit areas in the Reserve where people make recurring visits, ensuring that boaters practice ethical procedures and are aware of "Leave-No-Trace" guidelines. Volunteers also clean waste where needed. Rookery Bay teaches approximately many students each year through field trips. Estuary Explorers is a program organized for fourth-grade students and Rookery Bay Survivors is organized for seventh-grade students. Reserve resource managers facilitate land acquisition, conduct habitat and hydrology restoration projects, eradicate and control invasive plants and animals, protect listed species, respond to marine mammal strandings, manage important habitats and conduct prescribed fires to sustain native biodiversity. The reserve also offers seasonal guided boat and kayak tours. Researchers from a wide array of wildlife specializations study at Rookery Bay and the reserve uses the scientists' information to oversee its resources.

== See also ==
- National Estuarine Research Reserve
- Conservancy of Southwest Florida
