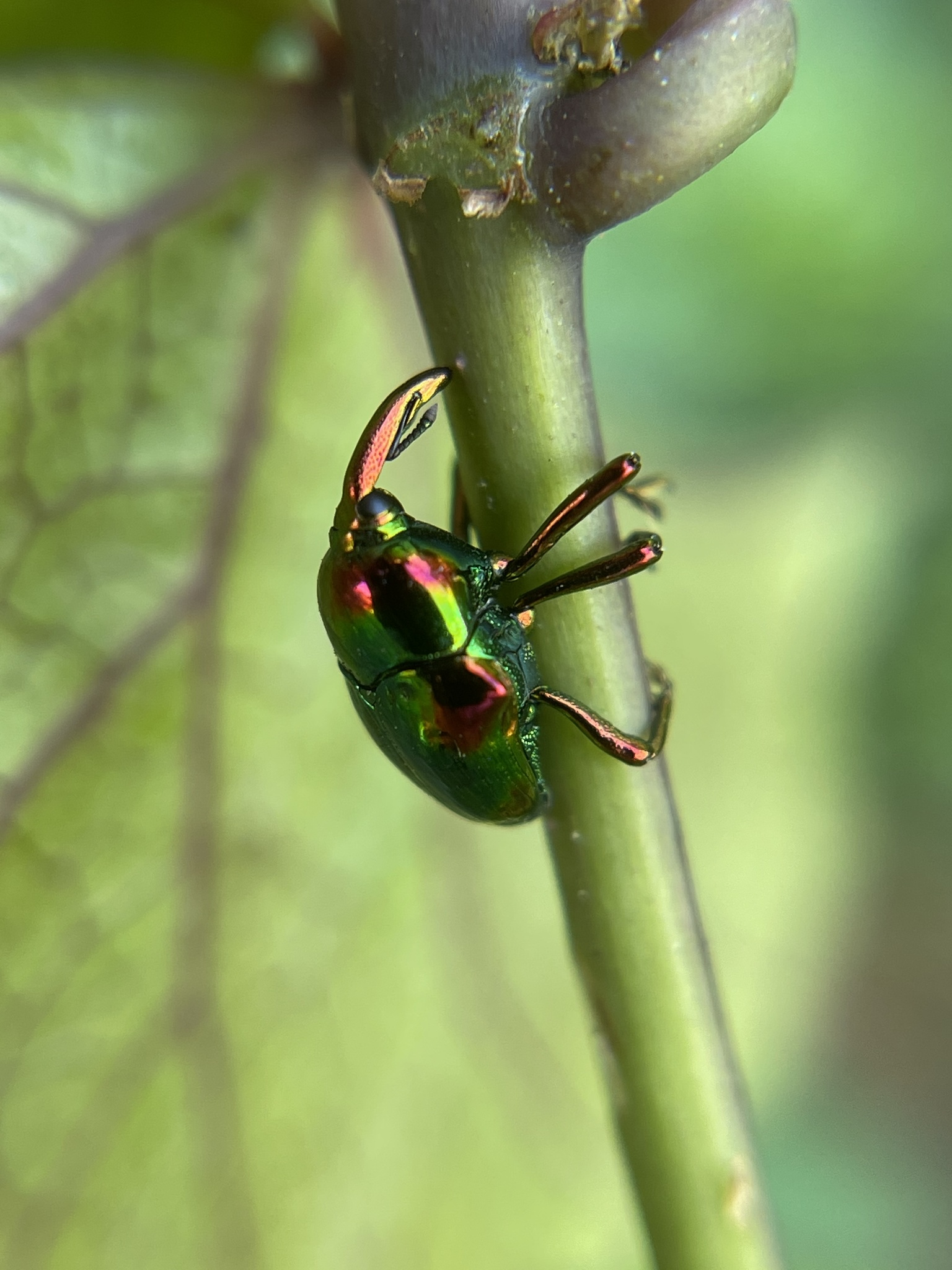

Scientific classification
- Domain: Eukaryota
- Kingdom: Animalia
- Phylum: Arthropoda
- Class: Insecta
- Order: Coleoptera
- Suborder: Polyphaga
- Infraorder: Cucujiformia
- Family: Eurhynchidae
- Genus: Eurhinus; J.C.W.Illiger, 1808

= Eurhinus =

Genus of insects

Eurhinus is a genus of beetles. The genus was first described by Johann Karl Wilhelm Illiger in 1808

== Taxonomy ==
Eurhinus contains the following species:

- Eurhinus aeruginosa
- Eurhinus atritarsis
- Eurhinus aureus
- Eurhinus cavilobus
- Eurhinus convexa
- Eurhinus cupratus
- Eurhinus cupripes
- Eurhinus festivus
- Eurhinus flaturarius
- Eurhinus magnificus
- Eurhinus occultus
- Eurhinus viridicolor
- Eurhinus viridipes
- Eurhinus viridis
- Eurhinus yucatecus
