= Saddle Creek Park (Florida) =

Public park in Polk County, Florida, US

Coordinates: 28.055258°N 81.884834°W

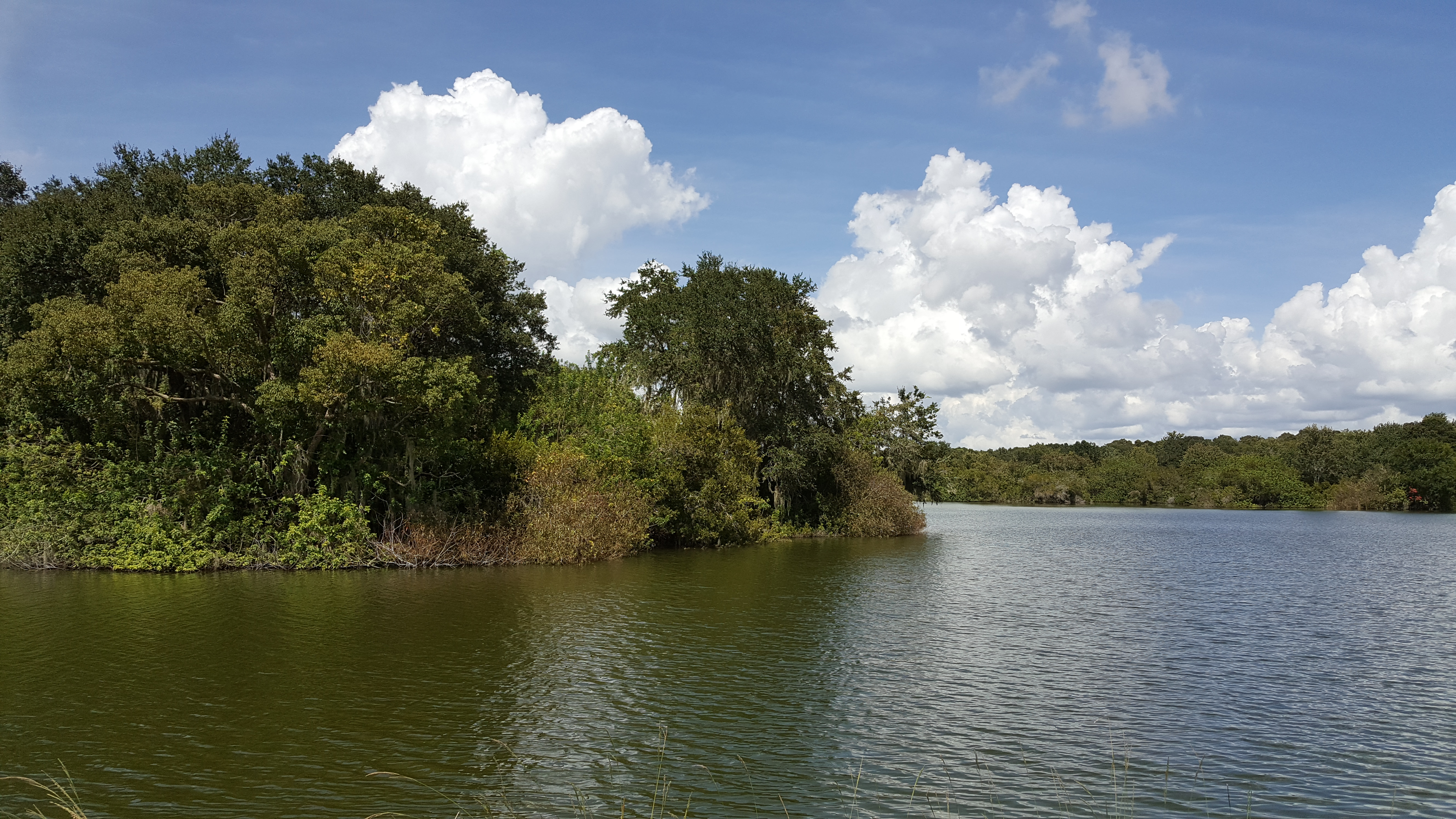
Pond in Saddle Creek Park, Polk County, Florida

Saddle Creek Park is a 740-acre park located between Winter Haven and Lakeland in Polk County, Florida It is on the site of three main lakes and a great many other abandoned phosphate pits, providing a large area of fishable shoreline. Over 175 species of birds have been recorded at the park. The maximum depth of the pits is 30 feet.

== History ==
In 1961 American Cyanamid donated a 740-acre tract to Polk County. Within 5 years, several miles of trails and sand beaches were added. In 1966 the beach was described as the only freshwater public swimming area in Lakeland. Abandoned mine tailings created hillocks as high as 50 feet. Numerous picnicking shelters were established and a canoe rental facility was opened.

In 1970, two African-American sisters drowned while swimming. In 1971 the state offered 100,000 for park expansion. In 1986 an aluminum boat capsized; two of the five occupants drowned.

In 1982, the county added a live-in Sheriff's deputy to provide security and crack down on unauthorized drinking at the park.

In 1985 and 1986, community groups fought against a pair of rezonings to property near the park. In 1985, 3 acres adjacent to the park were zoned commercial, and a RV Park was proposed. In spite of 1,271 petition signers and 70 protesters, the board approved the rezoning. In 1986, they disputed a proposal to build a mobile home park adjacent to the park, citing excessive density, flooding potential, and damage to wetlands.

In the 1990s the park became a popular hangout for gay men, resulting in a crackdown by the Polk County Sheriff's department that culminated in a sting operation in which 30 people were arrested.

In 2017, the park was opened to commercial fishing.

== Activities ==
- Fishing
- Boating
- Hiking
- Camping
- Soliciting
