= Polk's Nature Discovery Center =

Florida nature center

Coordinates: 27°59′24″N 81°51′25″W

Polk's Nature Discovery Center is located at the Circle B Bar Reserve in Lakeland, Florida. Opened on Halloween in 2008, the center offers displays and education programs about the 1,267-acre reserve (513 ha).

The exhibit hall features hands-on exhibits about the reserve's trees, plants and animals, and such ecosystems as the wetlands, lakes, sandhills, flatwoods and scrublands. Three exhibits about the Green Swamp, water systems and central Florida lakes were jointly funded by the Southwest Florida Water Management District's Alafia River, Hillsborough River and Peace River basin boards. There is also a theater showing films, an exploration lab and a room for quiet research. There are indoor and outdoor classrooms and monthly workshops on such topics as birding, photography, native plants and animals. Funds for the purchase were provided by an environmental lands acquisition referendum approved by voters in 1994. Construction began in 2007, consisting of four buildings totalling 16,000 square feet at a cost of 6.4 million dollars.

The Circle B Bar is the host of Water Wings and Wild Things, an annual event including nature-based art vendors, workshops, Florida animals, hands-on activities, guided tours and family activities include tree climbing, birdhouse and kite making, and a butterfly tent.
