= Lake Hancock (Washington) =

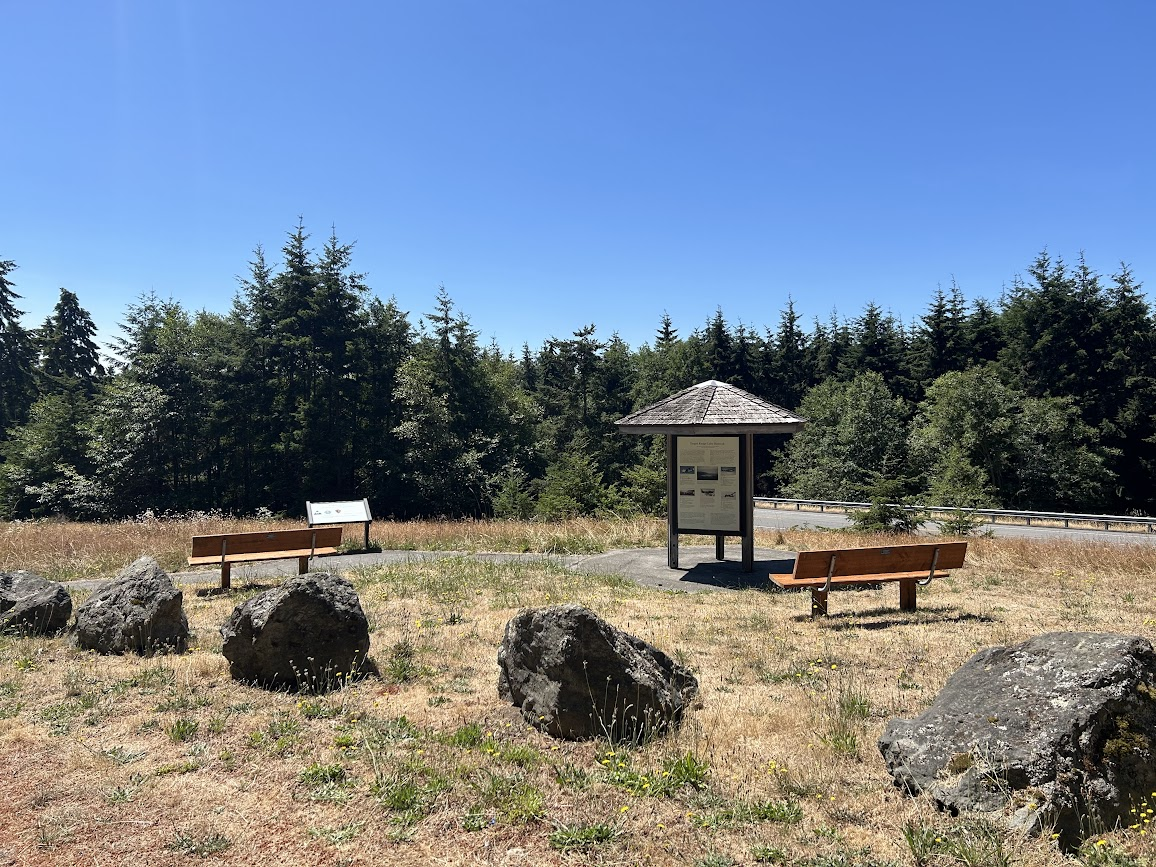
- Lake Hancock historical marker, situated across Highway 525 from the private Naval Preserve and estuary

- Location within Washington (state) Location within the United States
- Location: Whidbey Island, Washington
- Coordinates: 48°06′43″N 122°35′20″W
- Type: lagoon
- Etymology: Samuel Hancock (Whidbey Island settler)
- Part of: Puget Sound, Salish Sea
- Basin countries: United States
- Surface area: 200-acre (81 ha)
- Surface elevation: 3 feet (0.91 m)

Lake Hancock is a 200-acre (81 ha) coastal lagoon (and estuary) and former lake on Whidbey Island in the U.S. state of Washington. The elevation reported by United States Geological Survey is 3 feet (0.91 m). According to some conservationists, it is "the most well preserved estuary on the island". It was a U.S. Navy bombing range between 1943 and 1971, and legally is part of Naval Air Station Whidbey Island. The lake is in Greenbank, Washington about halfway down the length of 55-mile long Whidbey Island and nearly bisects it; the lake has contacted Admiralty Inlet on the island's west side since 1934, and from the east shore of the lake to Saratoga Passage on the east shore of the island near Greenbank Farm is less than one mile. Washington State Route 525 runs about 500 feet (150 m) from the lake's eastern shore, down the narrow strip between the two bodies of water. The lake was named for Samuel Hancock, an early settler of Whidbey Island.

The area is designated by Washington State Department of Ecology as the "Lake Hancock Munitions Response Site". In 2006, 120 tons of contaminated material including creosote coated logs was removed by helicopter from the lake. The Navy held public hearings in 2016 to determine if further cleanup of unexploded material should be undertaken.

== Sources ==
- Proposed Plan: Munitions Removal at Former Lake Hancock Target Range, Naval Air Station Whidbey Island, Washington (PDF), U.S. Navy Facilities Command (NAVFAC), June 2016, archived from the original (PDF) on January 24, 2017
