= Lake Hancock (Florida) =

Lake in Florida

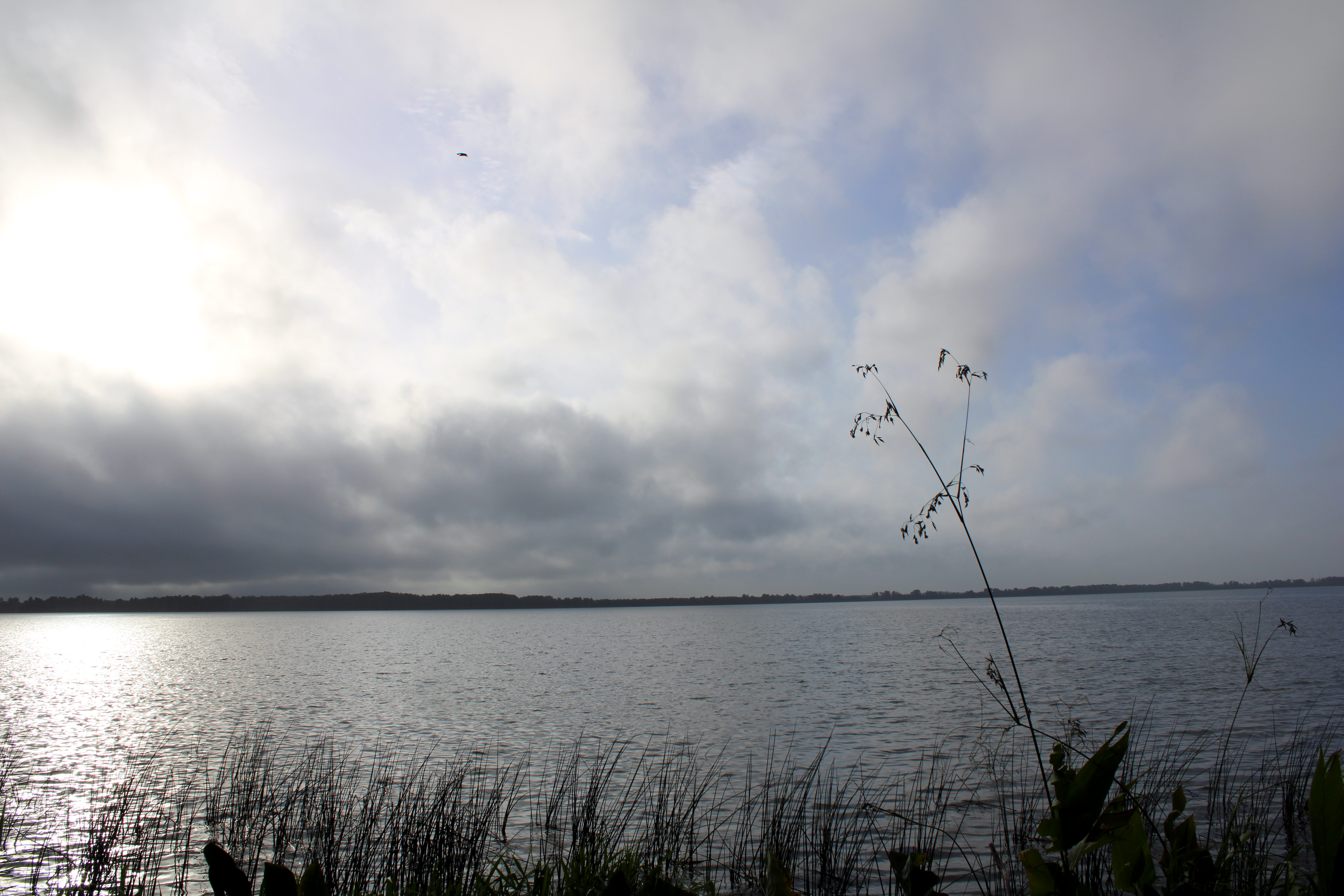
- Lake Hancock as viewed from Circle B Bar Reserve.

- Location within Florida Location within the United States
- Location: Polk County, Florida
- Coordinates: 27.9708°N 81.8381°W
- Primary outflows: Peace River (Florida)
- Basin countries: United States
- Surface area: 4,573 acres (18.51 km^{2})
- Average depth: 4 ft (1.2 m)
- Max. depth: 16 ft (4.9 m)
- Water volume: 5,113,577,588 US gal (19,356,996.86 m^{3})
- Settlements: Bartow, Highland City

Lake Hancock is north of Bartow, Florida in Polk County, Florida. It is ecologically important.

== Lake ==
Lake Hancock is located in the Polk Upland area between the Winter Haven Ridge and Lakeland Ridge. As part of the upper Peace River watershed, the lake has ecological importance throughout southwest Florida according to the Southwest Florida Water Management District. At 4,573 acres (18.51 km^{2}), it is one of the largest lakes in Polk County; the center of the cities of Bartow, Lakeland, and Winter Haven roughly form an equilateral triangle with sides of 12 miles (19 km) and Lake Hancock forms over 25% of that triangle. The lake is shallow, with an average depth of 4 feet (1.2 m) and a maximum depth of 16 feet (4.9 m).

== Flora and fauna ==
The lake is surrounded by cypress forests, with the understory primarily red maple and black willow. The open areas of the lake are relatively free from native vegetation, although hydrilla can occasionally be an issue and algae is abundant.

There is a substantial American alligator presence along the shoreline feeding on one of the largest colonial wading bird rookeries in central Florida. Although many lakes in Polk County are utilized by sports fishermen, Lake Hancock has not been used for recreational fishing in decades. The dominant fish in the lake are blue tilapia and threadfin shad, and suckermouth catfish.

== Settlement history ==
The Maroon settlement of Minatti (Spanish word for a Manatee) was established on the south shore of the lake east of Saddle Creek after the First Seminole War.

Oponay, an Ocmulgee Lower Creek Chief, allied with Red Stick leader Peter McQueen, lived across the lake about two miles away from the village of Minatti. He originally lived on the Flint River in Southwest Georgia prior to the First Seminole War and was an associate of Neamathla. He allied with the British during the War of 1812 and was part of the general migration into the Spanish Florida peninsula that followed the First Seminole War. The Maroons with him were likely those from the Flint River with whom he had been associated prior to the Seminole Wars.(see also Battle of the Negro Fort and Angola, Florida)

Fort Fraser was established nearby in 1837. The Native American and Maroon settlements were destroyed by the end of the Second Seminole War in 1842.

The first American settlements in the area occurred in 1849, when small farms were established in the area as a result of migration from the Tampa Bay Hurricane of 1848.

The Polk County Sheriff's Office's Burnham-McCall Training Center occupies a site in front of the former settlement site.

The Circle B Bar Reserve is located on the lake.
