= Crystal Springs, Florida =

- CDP
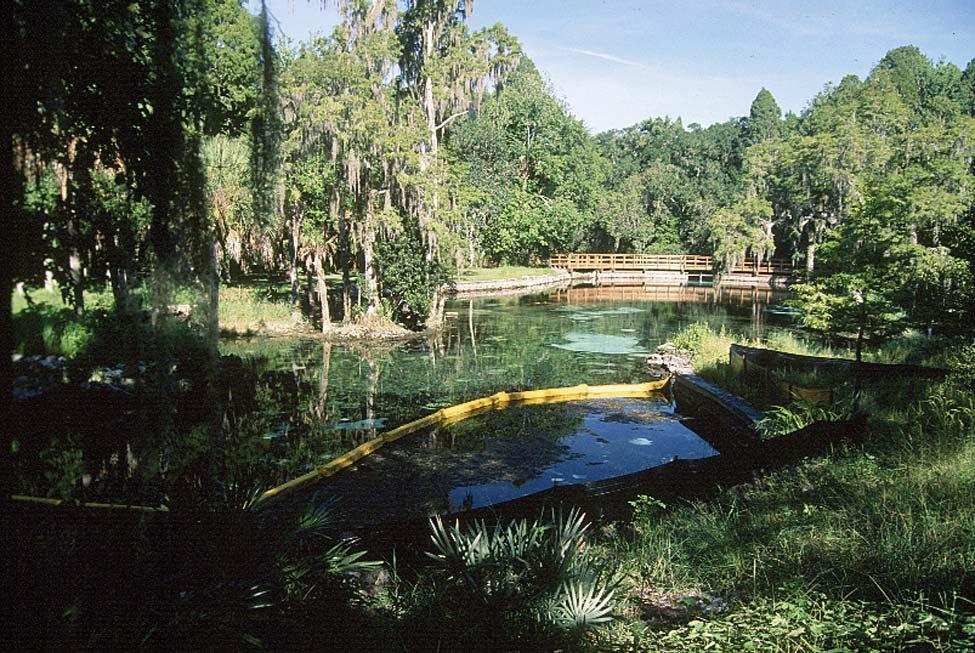
- Crystal Springs

- Location in Pasco County and the state of Florida
- Coordinates: 28°11′03″N 82°08′15″W
- Country: United States
- State: Florida
- County: Pasco

Area
  - Total: 5.91 sq mi (15.30 km^{2})
  - Land: 5.91 sq mi (15.30 km^{2})
  - Water: 0 sq mi (0.00 km^{2})
- Elevation: 72 ft (22 m)

Population (2020)
  - Total: 1,268
  - Density: 214.7/sq mi (82.89/km^{2})
- Time zone: UTC-5 (Eastern (EST))
  - Summer (DST): UTC-4 (EDT)
- ZIP code: 33524
- Area code: 813
- FIPS code: 12-15800
- GNIS feature ID: 2402808

Crystal Springs is a hydrological spring and a census-designated place (CDP) in Pasco County, Florida, United States. As of the 2020 census, Crystal Springs had a population of 1,268.

== Geography ==
According to the United States Census Bureau, the CDP has a total area of 5.6 square miles (15 km^{2}) that is all land.

== Demographics ==
Historical population
Census	Pop.	Note	%±
2020	1,268		—
U.S. Decennial Census

=== 2020 census ===
As of the 2020 census, Crystal Springs had a population of 1,268. The median age was 42.1 years. 23.5% of residents were under the age of 18 and 16.2% of residents were 65 years of age or older. For every 100 females there were 95.1 males, and for every 100 females age 18 and over there were 99.6 males age 18 and over.

31.2% of residents lived in urban areas, while 68.8% lived in rural areas.

There were 464 households in Crystal Springs, of which 29.3% had children under the age of 18 living in them. Of all households, 44.2% were married-couple households, 22.2% were households with a male householder and no spouse or partner present, and 23.3% were households with a female householder and no spouse or partner present. About 23.5% of all households were made up of individuals and 11.2% had someone living alone who was 65 years of age or older.

There were 508 housing units, of which 8.7% were vacant. The homeowner vacancy rate was 1.6% and the rental vacancy rate was 3.5%.

Racial composition as of the 2020 census
Race	Number	Percent
White	1,079	85.1%
Black or African American	8	0.6%
American Indian and Alaska Native	7	0.6%
Asian	4	0.3%
Native Hawaiian and Other Pacific Islander	0	0.0%
Some other race	68	5.4%
Two or more races	102	8.0%
Hispanic or Latino (of any race)	176	13.9%

=== 2000 census ===
As of the 2000 census, there were 1,175 people, 427 households, and 312 families residing in the CDP. The population density was 211.6 inhabitants per square mile (81.7/km^{2}). There were 474 housing units at an average density of 85.4 per square mile (33.0/km^{2}). The racial makeup of the CDP was 93.62% White, 0.60% African American, 0.68% Native American, 0.09% Asian, 3.06% from other races, and 1.96% from two or more races. Hispanic or Latino of any race were 5.36% of the population.

There were 427 households, out of which 34.0% had children under the age of 18 living with them, 56.2% were married couples living together, 10.8% had a female householder with no husband present, and 26.7% were non-families. 19.9% of all households were made up of individuals, and 7.7% had someone living alone who was 65 years of age or older. The average household size was 2.75 and the average family size was 3.15.

In the CDP, the population was spread out, with 27.1% under the age of 18, 8.3% from 18 to 24, 29.2% from 25 to 44, 24.3% from 45 to 64, and 11.1% who were 65 years of age or older. The median age was 36 years. For every 100 females, there were 102.9 males. For every 100 females age 18 and over, there were 100.7 males.

The median income for a household in the CDP was $42,578, and the median income for a family was $44,688. Males had a median income of $33,750 versus $19,583 for females. The per capita income for the CDP was $18,346. About 3.5% of families and 9.8% of the population were below the poverty line, including 7.4% of those under age 18 and 9.5% of those age 65 or over.

== Preserve ==
Crystal Springs Preserve is 525 acres of natural wilderness surrounding Crystal Springs, a Magnitude 2 spring that discharges 30 million gallons of water daily. There is a non-profit educational facility, Crystal Springs Foundation, operating on site with programs that show diverse ecosystems via trails, boardwalks, a wildlife pavilion, a butterfly garden and a nature center. The preserve is privately owned by Crystal Springs Preserve, Inc., a closely held private company. The spring is the source for Zephyrhills Natural Spring Water, a commercially bottled water product. The water that is bottled represents less than 1% of the flow of the spring.
