= Aulobaris =

Scientific classification
- Kingdom: Animalia
- Phylum: Arthropoda
- Class: Insecta
- Order: Coleoptera
- Suborder: Polyphaga
- Infraorder: Cucujiformia
- Family: Curculionidae
- Tribe: Baridini
- Genus: Aulobaris; LeConte, 1876

Genus of beetles

Aulobaris is a genus of flower weevils in the beetle family Curculionidae, with about eight described species.

== Species ==
- Aulobaris amplexa Casey, 1920
- Aulobaris anthracina (Boheman, 1836)
- Aulobaris dux Casey, 1892
- Aulobaris elongata Green, 1920
- Aulobaris misera Casey, 1920
- Aulobaris naso LeConte, 1876
- Aulobaris pusilla (LeConte, 1869)
- Aulobaris subdita Casey, 1920
