= Collier–Seminole State Park =

State park in Florida, United States

- IUCN category IV (habitat/species management area)
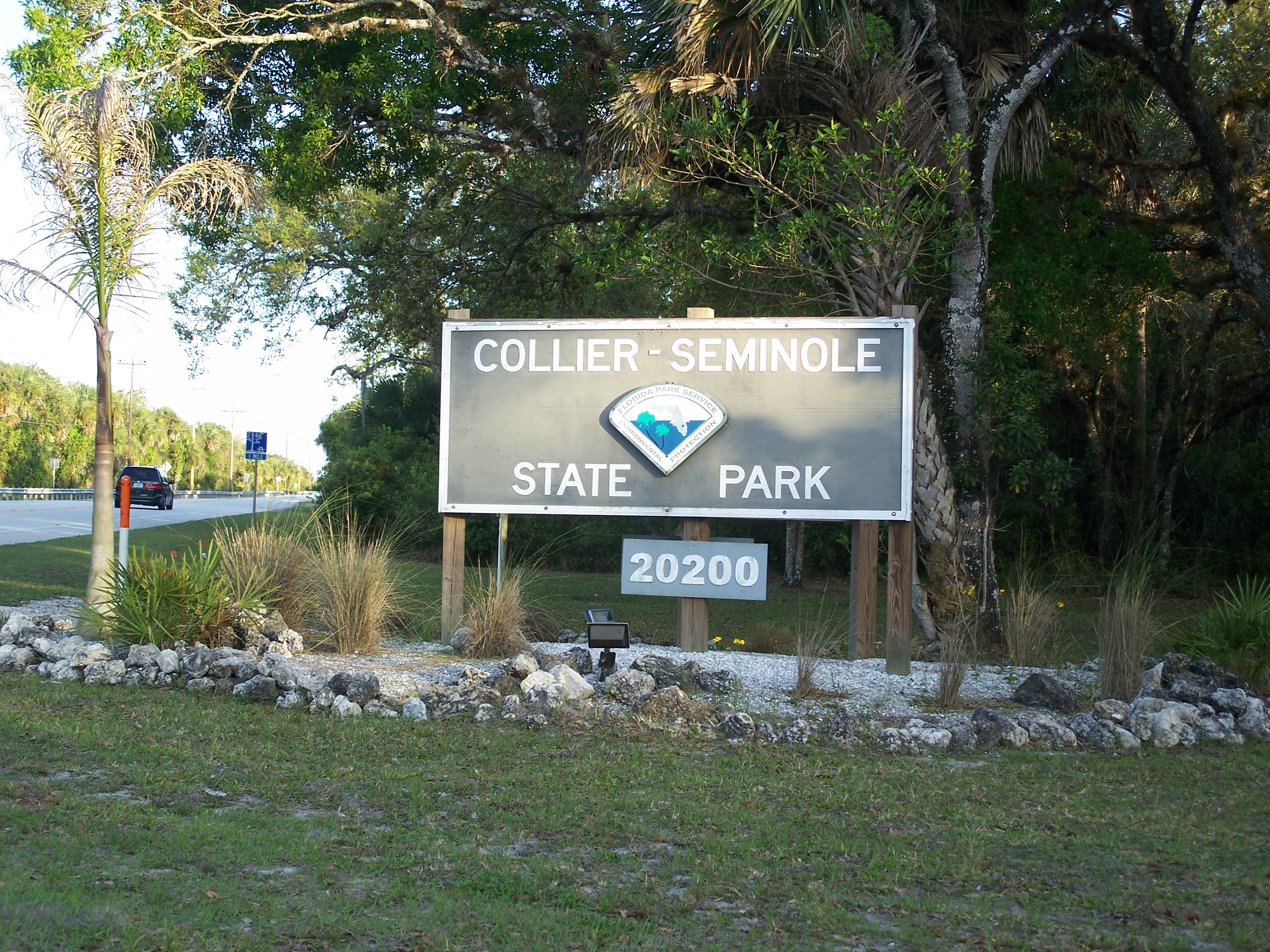

- Location within Florida Location within the United States
- Interactive map of Collier–Seminole State Park
- Location: Collier County, Florida, United States
- Nearest city: Naples, Florida
- Coordinates: 25°58′34″N 81°36′14″W
- Established: 1947
- Governing body: Florida Department of Environmental Protection

Collier–Seminole State Park is a Florida State Park located on US 41, 17 miles (27 km) south of Naples, Florida. The park is the home of a National Historic Mechanical Engineering Landmark, the Bay City Walking Dredge used to build the Tamiami Trail through the Everglades. The park covers 7,271 acres (29 km^{2}) and includes mangrove swamp, cypress swamps, salt marshes, mangrove river estuaries, and pine flatwoods. Among the wildlife of the park are American alligators, raccoons, ospreys, and American white ibis. brown pelicans, wood storks, bald eagles, red-cockaded woodpeckers, American crocodiles, Florida black bears (Ursus americanus floridanus) and Big Cypress fox squirrels (Sciurus niger avicennia) also inhabit the park.

Activities include picnicking, hiking, bicycling, canoeing, camping, wildlife viewing, fishing and boating. Amenities include an RV park, four pavilion picnic shelters, a boat ramp, and a full-facility campground with youth, group and primitive campsites. The park has a number of trails. A 13.6-mile (21.9 km) canoe trail that flows down the Blackwater River through a mangrove forest. A 6.5-mile (10.5 km) hiking trail runs through the park. A .9-mile nature trail features a boardwalk system and observation platform that overlooks the salt marsh. The park is open from 8:00 am until sundown year-round.

== Gallery ==
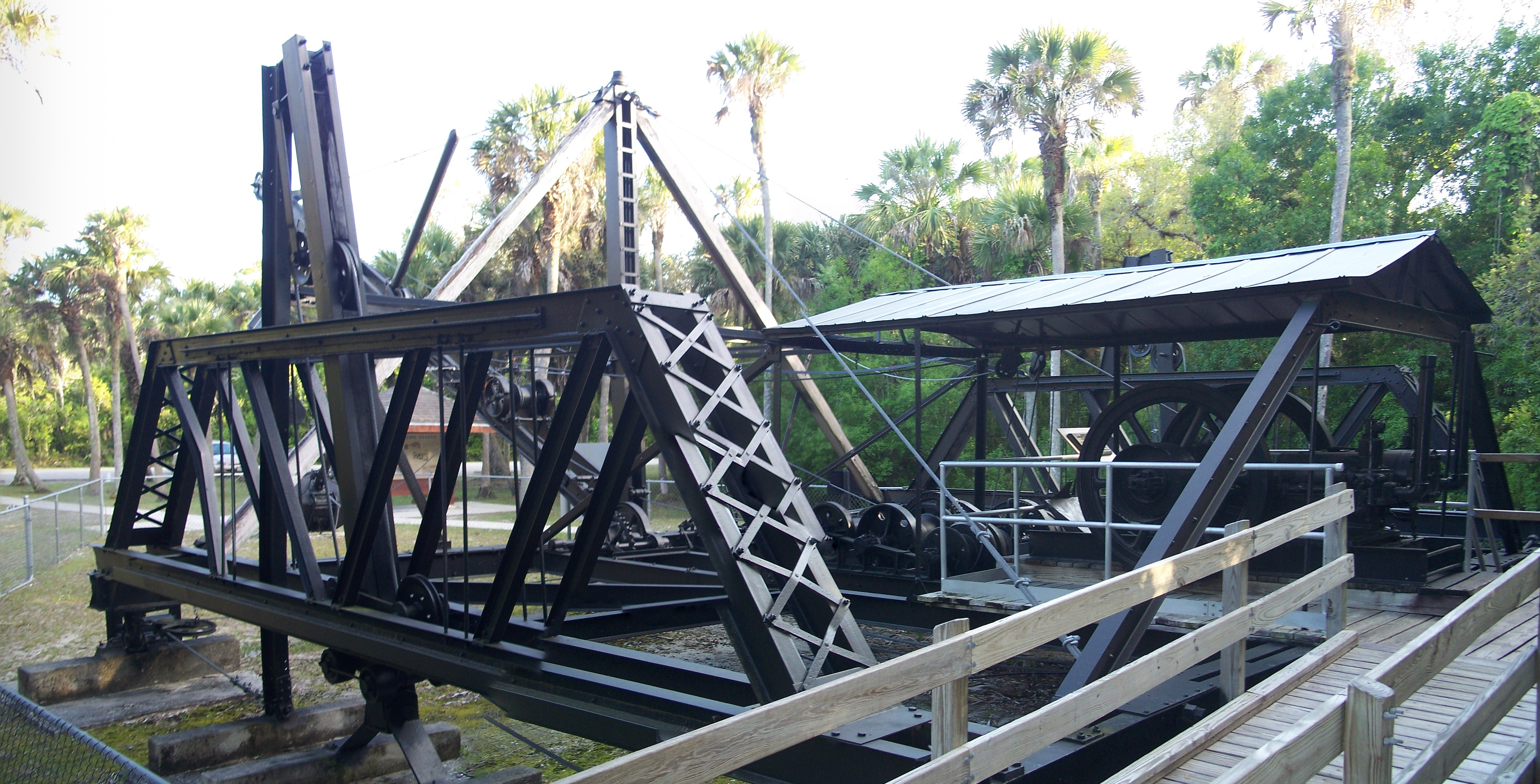
Bay City Walking Dredge

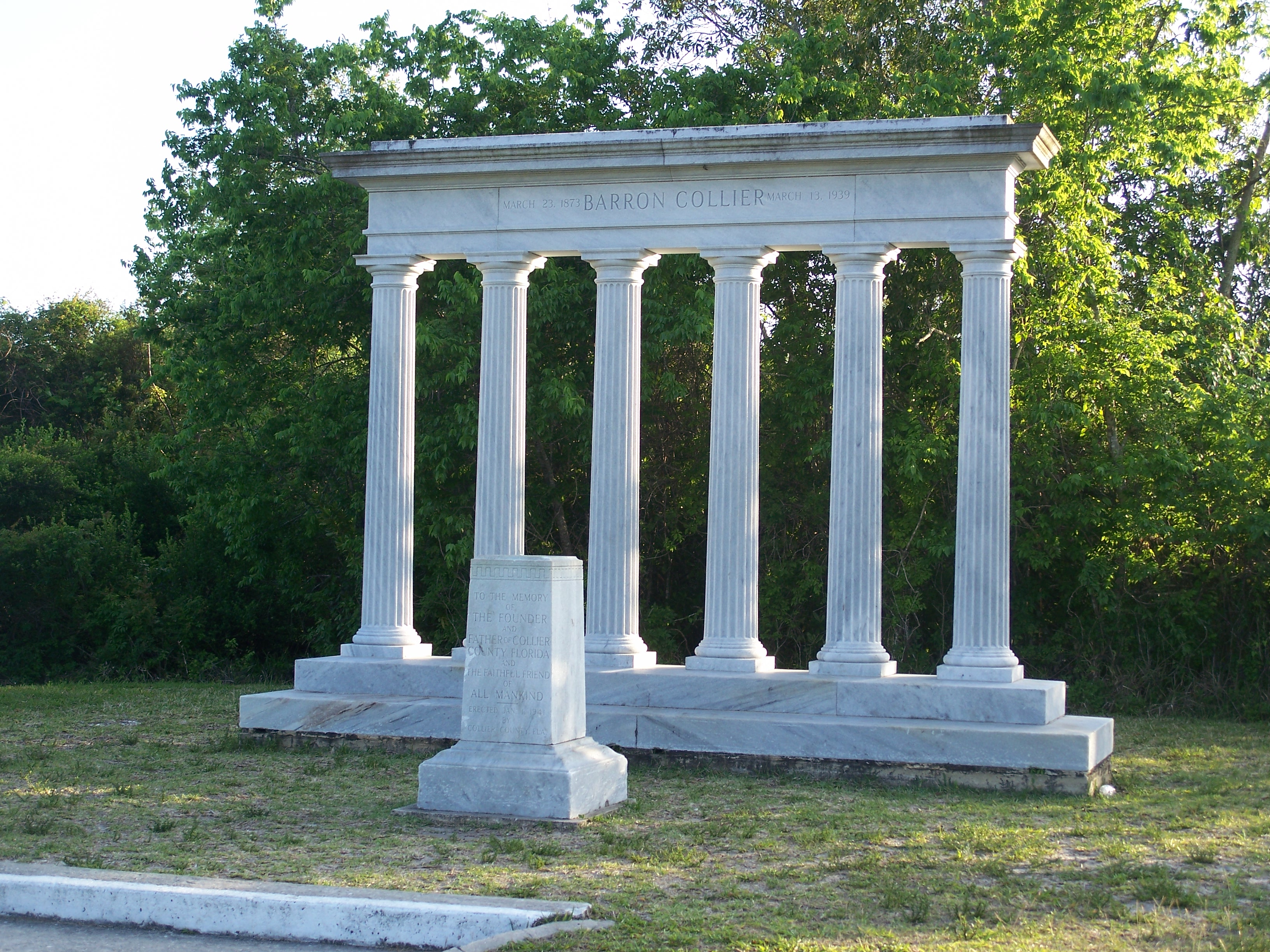
Memorial to Barron Collier

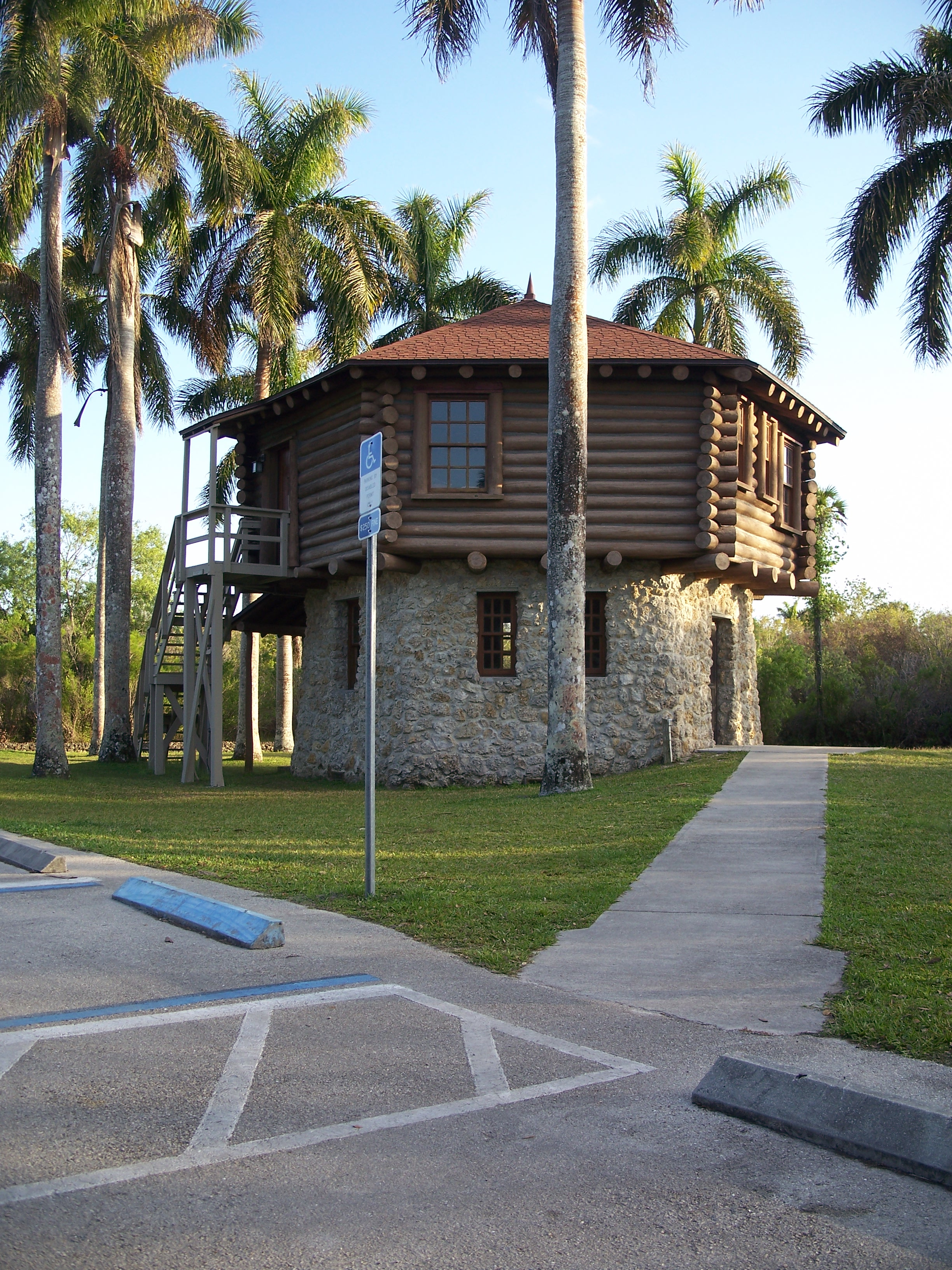
Tower

== References and external links ==
Media related to Collier-Seminole State Park at Wikimedia Commons

- Collier–Seminole State Park
- Florida State Parks – Collier–Seminole State Park
