= Circle B Bar Reserve =

Protected area in Polk County, Florida, US

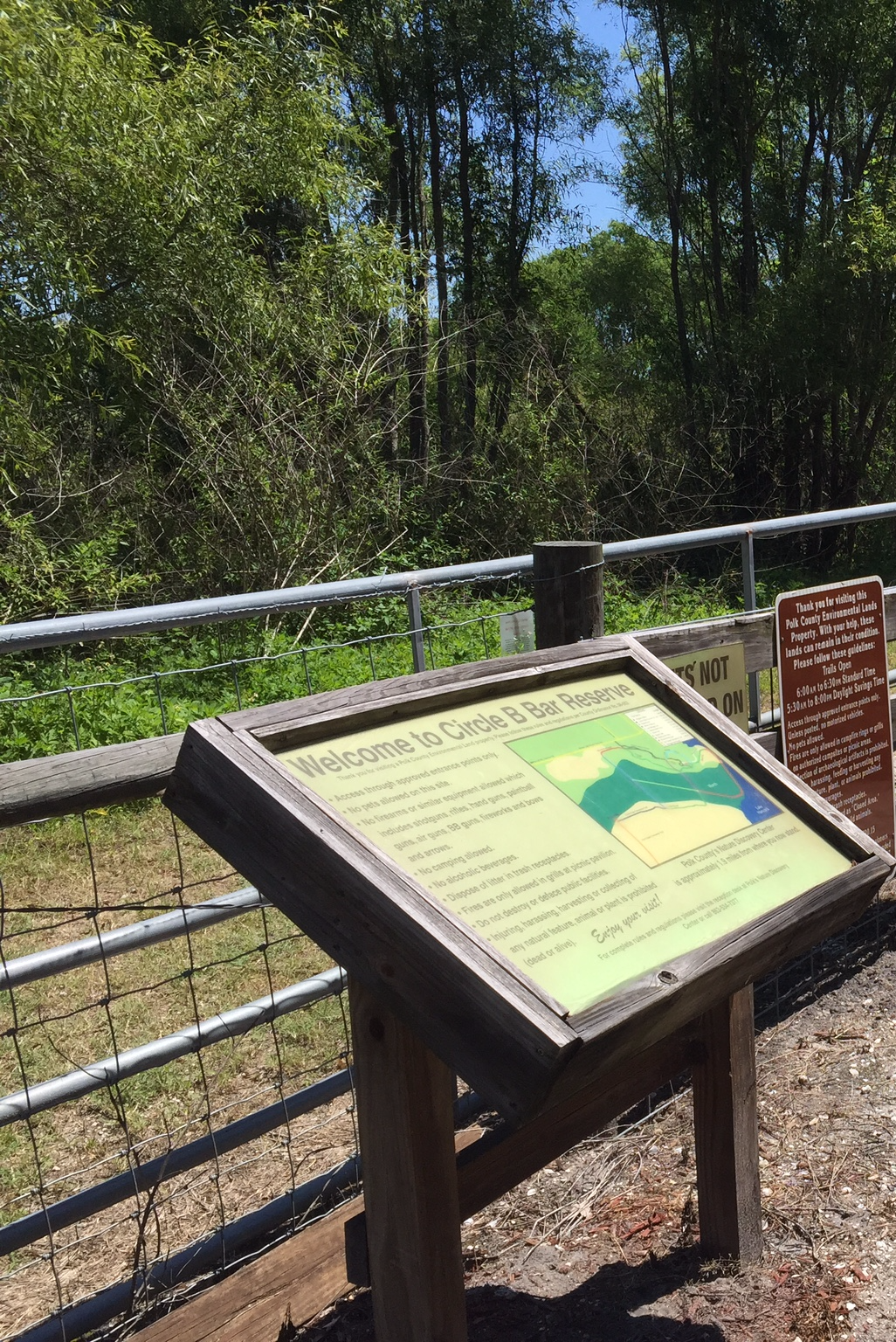
- Entrance to the Circle B Bar Reserve from the Fort Fraser-Circle B Bar connector trail.

- Location within Florida
- Location: 4399 Winter Lake Road (SR 540); Polk County, Florida
- Nearest city: Lakeland
- Coordinates: 27.9899°N 81.8668°W
- Area: 1,267 acres (5.13 km^{2})
- Website: www.swfwmd.state.fl.us/recreation/areas/circlebbarreserve.html

The Circle B Bar Reserve is an area of protected lands in Polk County, Florida, United States. Consisting of 1,267 acres (5.13 km^{2}) near Lakeland, the restored wetlands site is managed by the Polk County Board of County Commissioners (BOCC), which co-owns it with the Southwest Florida Water Management District. The park was purchased in 2000 for $7.4 million using funds provided by an environmental lands acquisition referendum approved by voters in 1994.

Polk's Nature Discovery Center, completed in 2008, features interactive displays about the plants, animals, and ecosystems of the reserve. The center serves as the focus of environmental education programs and explorations for families, school groups, teachers, adults, and other visitors. Construction began in 2007, consisting of four buildings totaling 16,000 square feet at a cost of $6.4 million.

Circle B Bar Reserve is named after the cattle ranch that once occupied the site. It was purchased from Alfred Bellotto in the year 2000 to help maintain the Banana Creek marsh area, home to an array of birds, such as white ibis, roseate spoonbills, sandhill cranes, and bald eagles, along with other wildlife, like alligators, bobcats, snakes, gray squirrels, river otters, and wild hogs.

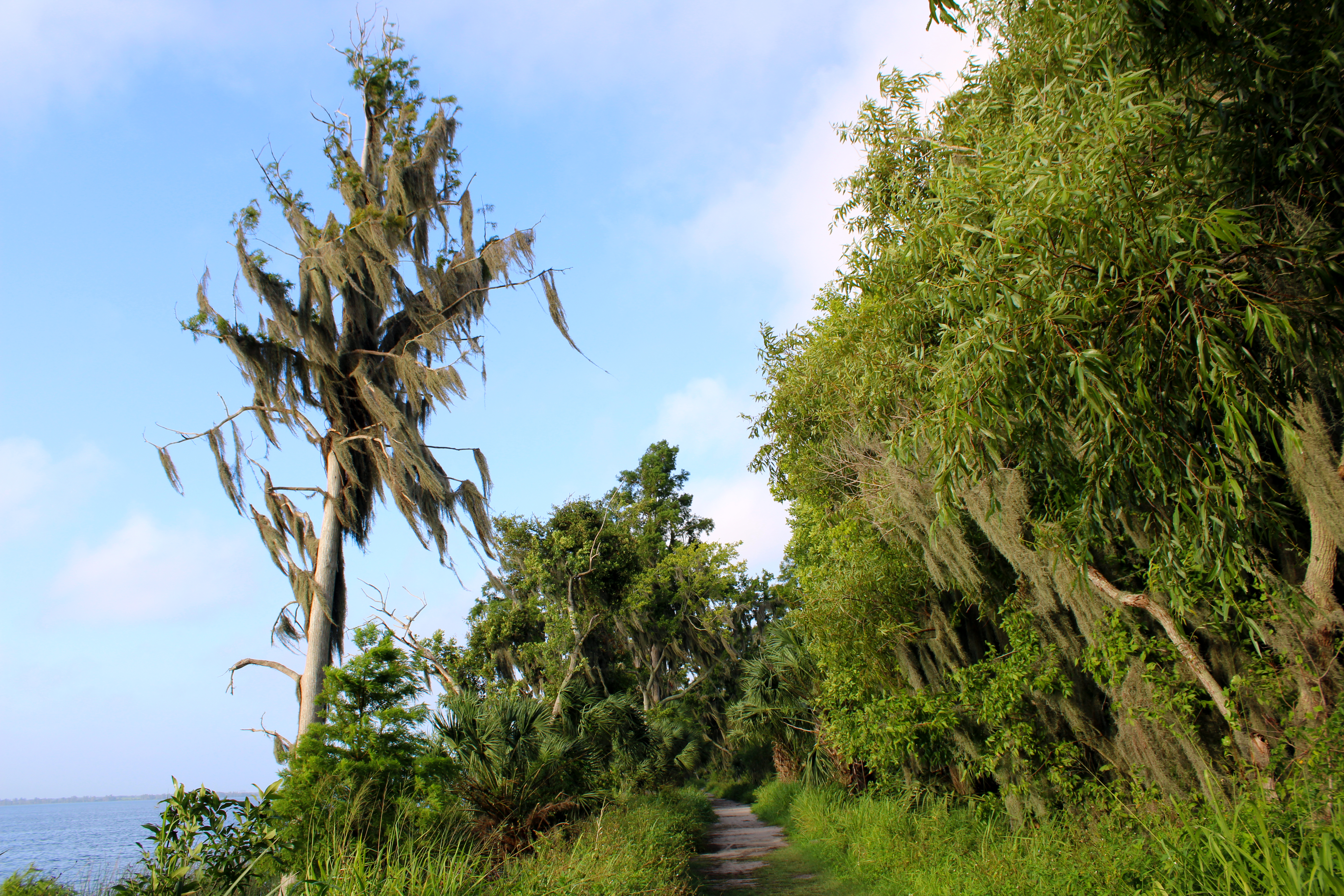
Vuew from the Alligator Alley trail, adjacent to Lake Hancock

The preserve has been designated as a Great Florida Birding Trail site, a program of the Florida Fish and Wildlife Conservation Commission. Sites are selected for their excellent birdwatching, wildlife viewing, or educational opportunities. Circle B Bar contains 3.5 miles (5.6 km)s of unpaved hiking/biking trails and is connected to the paved Fort Fraser Trail by the 0.6-mile paved Fort Fraser-Circle B Bar Connector Trail, which runs from Lakeland to Bartow.
