= Conservancy of Southwest Florida =

U.S. nonprofit organization

- Interactive map of Conservancy of Southwest Florida
- Type: Conservation organization, nature center
- Location: 495 Smith Preserve Way; Naples, Florida
- Coordinates: 26°09′58″N 81°47′17″W
- Area: 21 acres (8.5 ha)
- Created: 1964
- Website: www.conservancy.org

The Conservancy of Southwest Florida is an organization located on 21 acres in Naples, Florida, and features the Conservancy of Southwest Florida Nature Center.

The Conservancy dates back to 1964 when a small group of concerned citizens in Naples succeeded in stopping the construction of a roadway through Rookery Bay. Ever since, the Conservancy has focused on protecting the water, land and wildlife of the Southwest Florida area through environmental policy, science, education and wildlife rehabilitation.

The Conservancy of Southwest Florida focuses its efforts in five Southwest Florida counties: Collier, Charlotte, Lee, Hendry and Glades.

== Conservancy of Southwest Florida Nature Center ==
The original Conservancy of Southwest Florida Nature Center was built in 1981, and $24 million from a $38.8 million campaign completed in 2013 allowed for a "sustainable" renovation of the 21-acre Conservancy.

Among the renovations are a new entrance, three new buildings and three renovated buildings, along with two filter marshes and four more acres of nature preserves. All of the new buildings were constructed with environmental impact as a main concern, abiding by LEED Standards and using geothermal energy for cooling.

The new Conservancy Nature Center now includes the von Arx Wildlife Hospital, Eaton Conservation Hall with the Jeannie Meg Smith Theater, the interactive Dalton Discovery Center with a 5,000 gallon patch-reef aquarium and touch tank.

The Ferguson Learning Lab features a Hall of Invasive Species to highlight the non-native wildlife species making a home in Southwest Florida. The Labs are used as a STEM (science, technology, engineering and math) institute to teach the next generation of environmental leaders. In 2014 the Little Explorer Play Zone opened to engage visitors 5 and younger.

The Bradley Nature Store and Welcome Center offers one of the area’s largest variety of nature-inspired books and all things related to the Southwest Florida water, land and wildlife.

In addition, there are filter marshes and nature preserves to explore, short walking trails, kayak rentals and the Allyn Family Dock and Lagoon with a fleet of electric tour boats of the Gordon River.

The Conservancy of Southwest Florida Nature Center is also designated as Site #69 on the Great Florida Birding Trail.

== History ==
On April 11, 1964, a group of concerned citizens met to prevent a "Road to Nowhere" proposed to be built through Rookery Bay, a lush landscape of tropical lands and water, home to a variety of unique Southwest Florida wildlife. By the next year, over $300,000 was raised by locals in order to save and preserve Rookery Bay as a nature sanctuary, and so the Collier County Conservancy was formed.

Since then, Conservancy of Southwest Florida has grown from an advocacy and land preservation organization to an integrated organization including science and research, education and wildlife rehabilitation.

== Wildlife rehabilitation ==
Conservancy of Southwest Florida plays an active role in protecting wild animals from harm, much of which is caused unintentionally by humans. New housing and business developments lead to loss of bird, reptile and mammal habitat as well as contamination of water and the local ecosystems.

Fishing hooks and lines entangle pelicans, and unsecured garbage poses a risk for hungry scavengers like raccoons and possums.

In 2013, the von Arx Wildlife Hospital officially opened, which helps care for injured, sick and orphaned wildlife and works to protect around 100 threatened or endangered species in Southwest Florida. Over 3,300 are treated at the Wildlife Hospital every year, with about half being released back into their native habitat when they have successfully recovered.

The 5,000 square foot hospital is energy-efficient and contains separate wings for mammals, reptiles and birds. There is also a pediatric unit equipped with incubators for newborns.

== Environmental policy and science ==
Conservancy environmental scientists monitor, collect, research and record important environmental data regarding the region’s water land and wildlife.

The environmental policy team utilizes science-based data to support and protect the local ecosystems. Team members work to encourage lawmakers and the legislature to make informed and environmentally conscious decisions regarding what is best for our land, water and wildlife within the five counties covered by Conservancy of Southwest Florida.

The policy team makes sure that each county grows and develops within its limits, as designated by its Growth Management Plan and Future Land Use Map.

The team also brings up any proposed changes or discrepancies with community members, stakeholders, and other appropriate decision makers to ensure the natural features of Southwest Florida are protected forever – balancing economic vitality with environmental stewardship and protection.

== Environmental education ==
A major focus of Conservancy initiatives is to educate the public on the natural world around them, how to lessen environmental impact, and how to protect the local waters and native wildlife inhabitants.

The Conservancy offers plenty of opportunities to learn - from talented naturalists, environmental speakers, tour boat captains and knowledgeable docents in the Dalton Discovery Center.

The Ferguson Learning Lab and Nature Center combination provides a place for kids to learn about the environment both indoors and out.

Summer camp is also available for children, and school groups are welcome for guided field trips.

The Conservancy education team provides outreach programs to the schools, reaching thousands of students each year.
