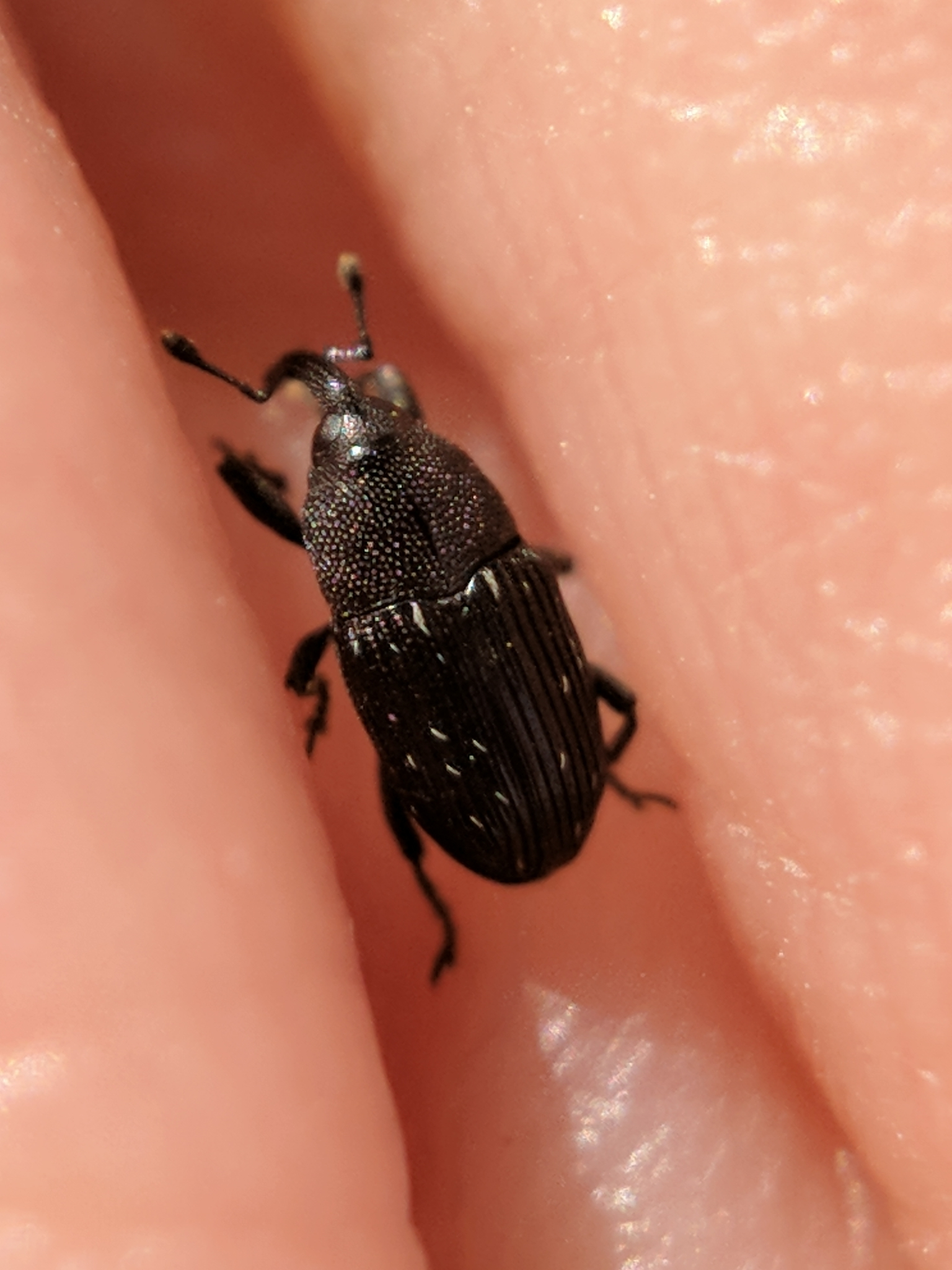
- Pseudobaris nigrina

Scientific classification
- Kingdom: Animalia
- Phylum: Arthropoda
- Class: Insecta
- Order: Coleoptera
- Suborder: Polyphaga
- Infraorder: Cucujiformia
- Family: Curculionidae
- Tribe: Baridini
- Genus: Pseudobaris; LeConte, 1876

Diversity
- c. 100 species

= Pseudobaris =

Genus of beetles

Pseudobaris is a genus of flower weevils in the beetle family Curculionidae. There are at least 100 described species in Pseudobaris.

== See also ==
- List of Pseudobaris species
