= Ralph E. Simmons Memorial State Forest =

Florida forest

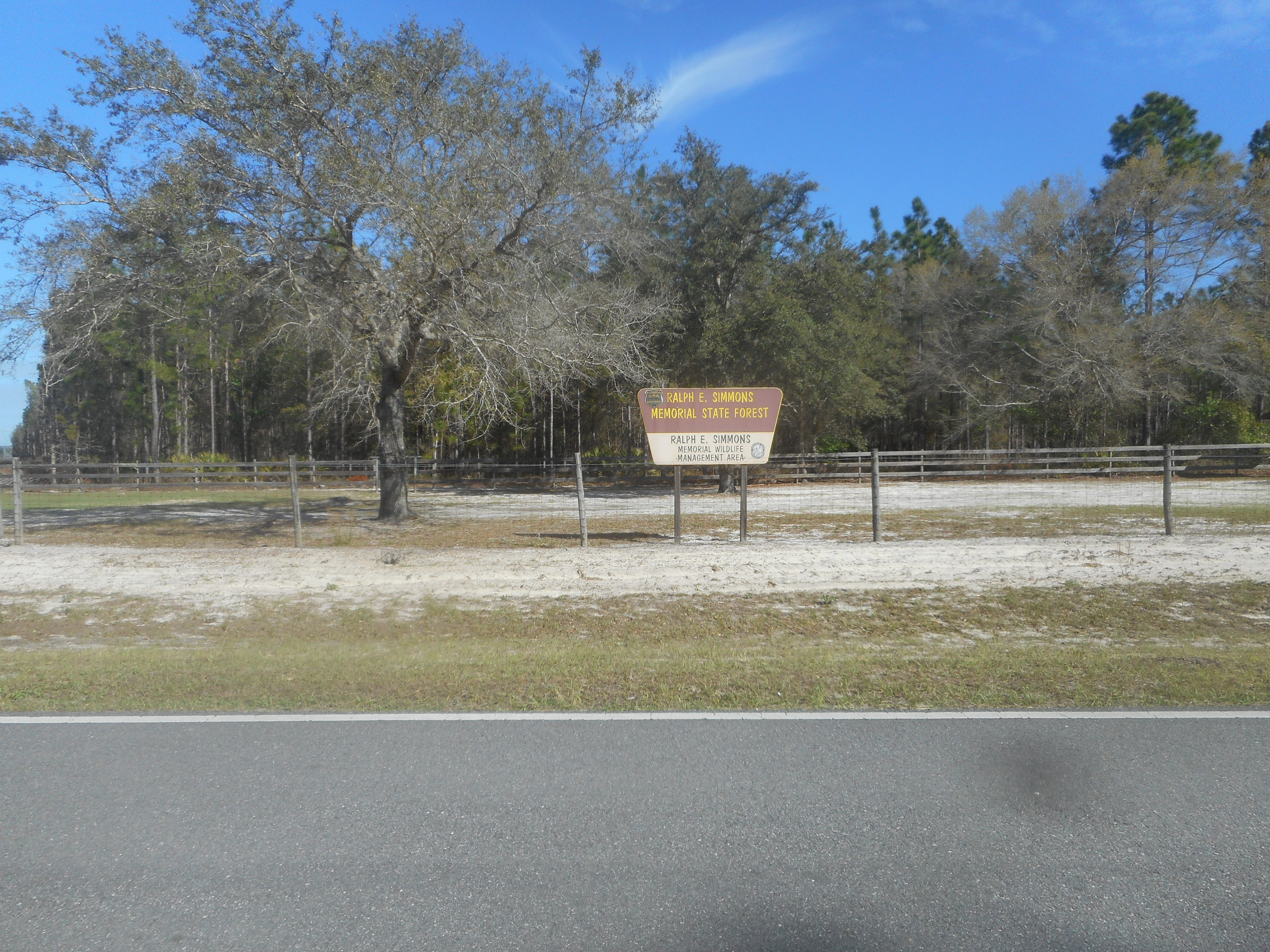
- Trailhead on Lake Hampton Road in Ralph E. Simmons Memorial State Forest.

- Map of Florida
- Location: Nassau County, Florida
- Nearest city: Hilliard
- Area: 3,638 acres (1,472 ha)
- Governing body: Florida Forest Service

The Ralph E. Simmons Memorial State Forest (formerly the St. Mary's State Forest) is in the U.S. state of Florida. The 3,638-acre (15 km^{2}) forest is located in northeastern Florida, near Hilliard, although it is closer to Boulogne. The forest was renamed in 1996 for Ralph E. Simmons, a former member of the St. Johns River Water Management District Governing Board.

Access to the forest is available from Lake Hampton Road, the northernmost west to east paved road in Nassau County.

The Florida Forest Service manages the property under an agreement established in 1992 with the St. Johns River Water Management District.

== See also ==
- List of Florida state forests
- List of Florida state parks
