= Peace River State Forest =

State forest in DeSoto County, Florida, United States

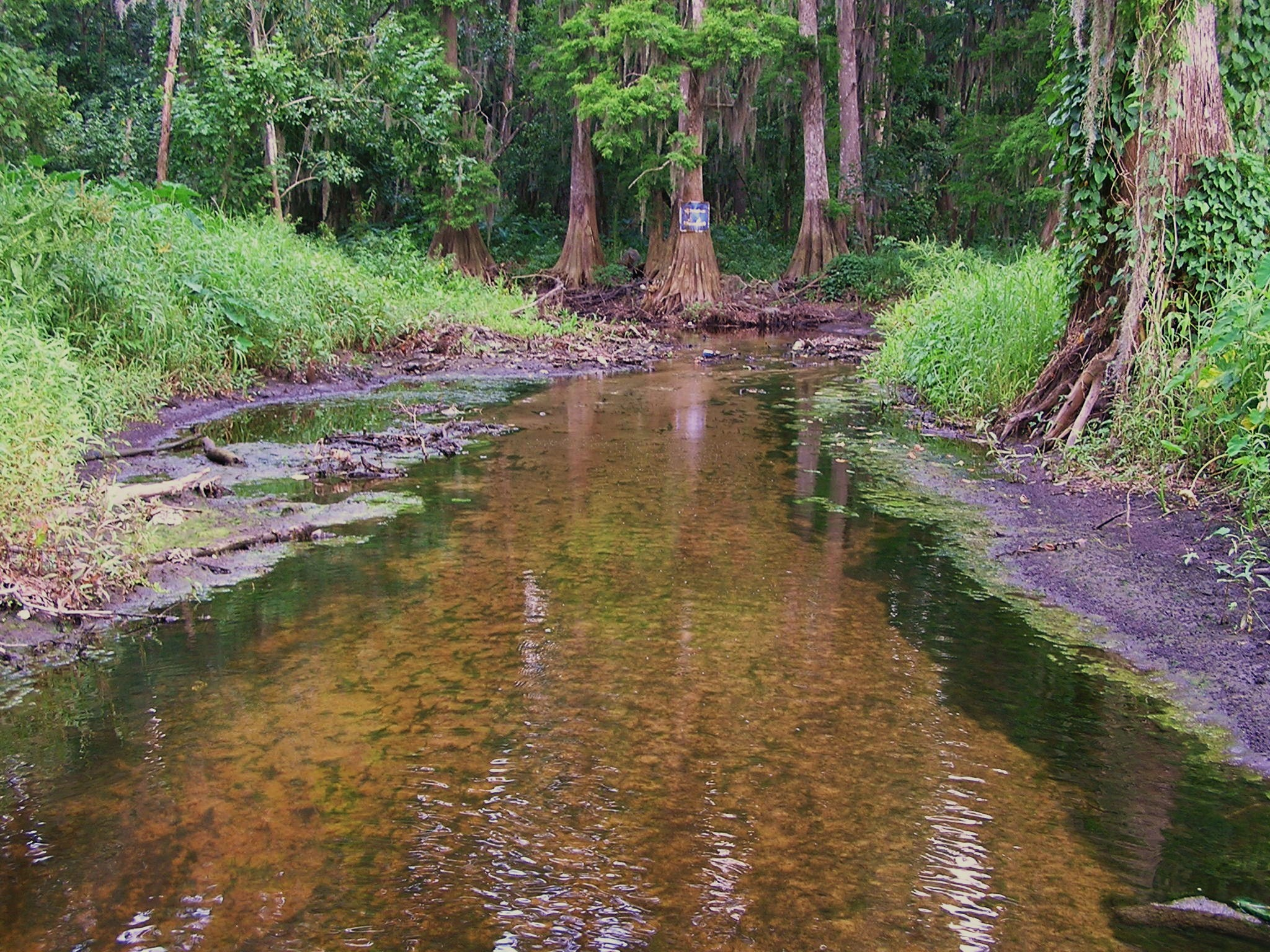
- View down the upper Peace River

- Location within Florida Location within the United States
- Interactive map of Peace River State Forest
- Location: DeSoto County, Florida, United States
- Nearest city: Arcadia
- Coordinates: 27.127°N 81.971°W
- Area: 5,047 acres (2,042 ha)
- Established: October 2014
- Governing body: Florida Forest Service
- Website: www.fdacs.gov/Forest-Wildfire/Our-Forests/State-Forests/Peace-River-State-Forest

Peace River State Forest is a 5,047-acre (2,042 ha) Florida state forest in western DeSoto County, about 6 miles (9.7 km) southwest of Arcadia. It is managed by the Florida Forest Service (FFS) and open by appointment for access to 9 miles (14 km) of the Peace River and 7 miles (11 km) of its tributary Horse Creek, including the confluence of the two. The state forest includes land that was used as a breeding farm for exotic animals that became Peaceful Horse Ranch.

Peace River State Forest is at 4300 SW County Road 769. It has improved range, floodplain forest, cypress, mixed hammock and pine flatwood remnants. It has the Aurin Lake Horse Trail.

== History ==
The forest was formerly the Peaceful Horse Ranch, where an earlier owner bred rhinos, hippos, giraffes and other exotic hoofstock for nearly a decade. In 2010 the state added the ranch to its list of conservation land it wanted to buy, but at a value of $14 million it went unpurchased, and after its owners went bankrupt the phosphate company Mosaic bought it for $10 million. To settle a lawsuit by the Sierra Club and other environmental groups over a mine expansion on the border of Hardee and Polk counties, Mosaic agreed in 2012 to give the ranch to the Florida Department of Environmental Protection for a state park, along with $2 million for upkeep. By February 2013 the department had declined the gift, saying the land was not suited to a state park and was close to existing parks, including Paynes Creek Historic State Park.

Mosaic donated the ranch to the state in October 2014 for management by the Florida Forest Service. 852 acres (345 ha) of state-owned swamp and overflow lands were added to the forest in 2015.

== Habitats ==
The forest's natural communities are mainly floodplain swamp, mesic flatwoods and mesic hammock, with basin and dome swamps. About 1,000 acres (400 ha) of flatwoods had been converted to improved pasture and zoo facilities before state ownership, and much of the pasture remains in use under a cattle grazing and hay lease. Listed species recorded on the forest include the gopher tortoise and the giant orchid (Pteroglossaspis ecristata).

== Management ==
The Forest Service manages the forest mainly to protect the water quality of the Peace River, which flows into the Charlotte Harbor estuary, and its recreation centers on Operation Outdoor Freedom, the agency's program for disabled veterans. Public trails include the 2-mile (3.2 km) Horse Creek Hiking Trail and the 6-mile (9.7 km) Aurin Lake Horse Trail, which passes the confluence of the river and Horse Creek and requires a state forest use permit.

The Horse Creek Hiking Trail follows the creek and returns to its trailhead through oak hammock and open pine flatwoods.

A muzzleloader deer hunt for veterans was scheduled at the property in 2025.

== See also ==
- List of Florida state parks
- List of Florida state forests
- Water management districts in Florida
