= Ross Prairie State Forest =

State forest in Florida, United States

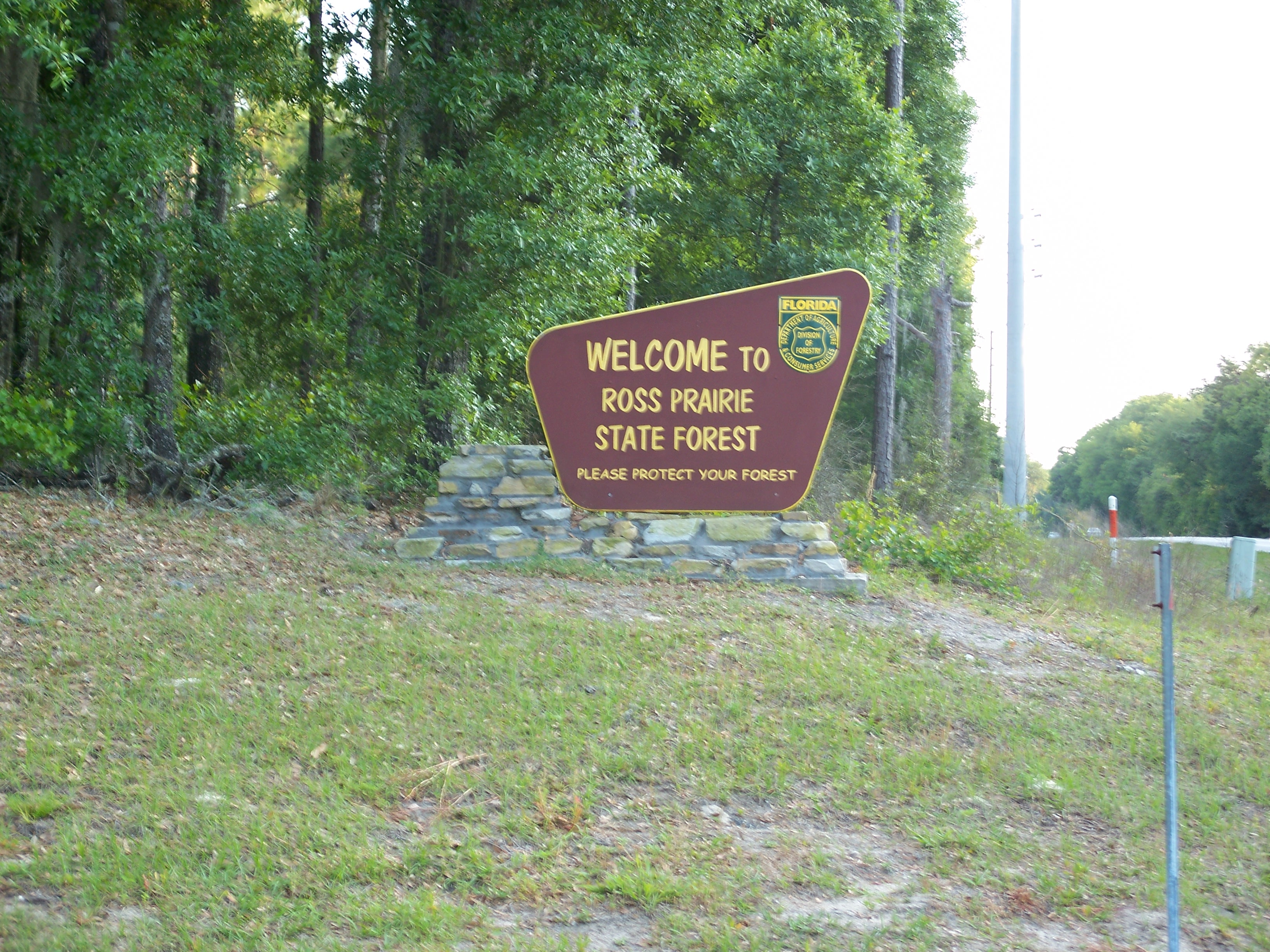
- Ross Prairie State Forest signage off State Road 200

- Location within Florida Location within the United States
- Location: Marion County, Florida
- Nearest city: Ocala, Florida
- Coordinates: 29.020°N 82.287°W
- Area: 3,527 acres (14.27 km^{2})
- Governing body: Florida Forest Service

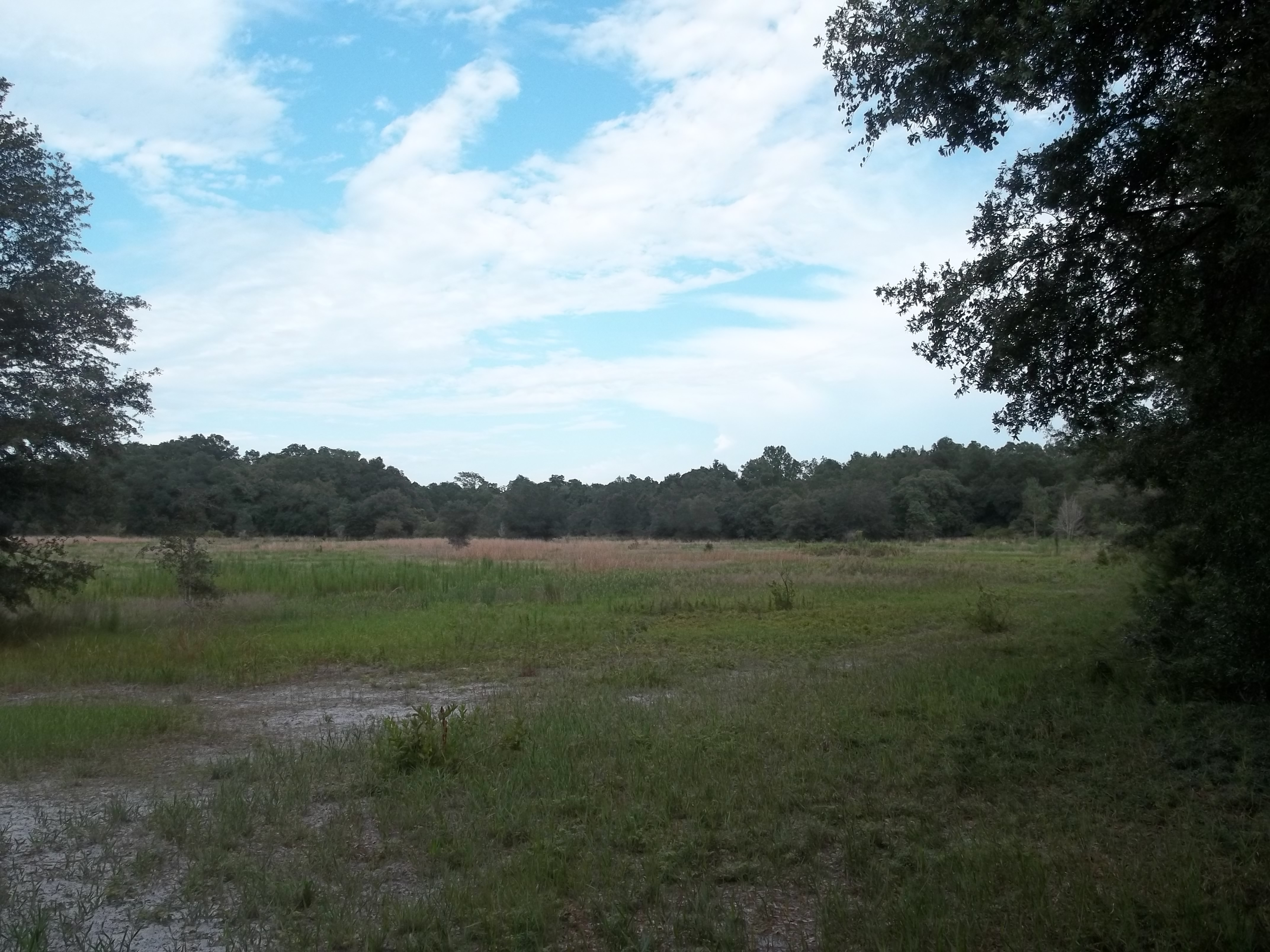
Ross Prairie State Forest

Ross Prairie State Forest is a 3,527-acre state forest in Marion County, Florida. The conservation land was acquired in 1995 through the Conservation and Recreation Lands (CARL) with funds from the Preservation 2000 Act. It includes hiking and horseback trails. There is also a trailhead for the Cross Florida Greenway.

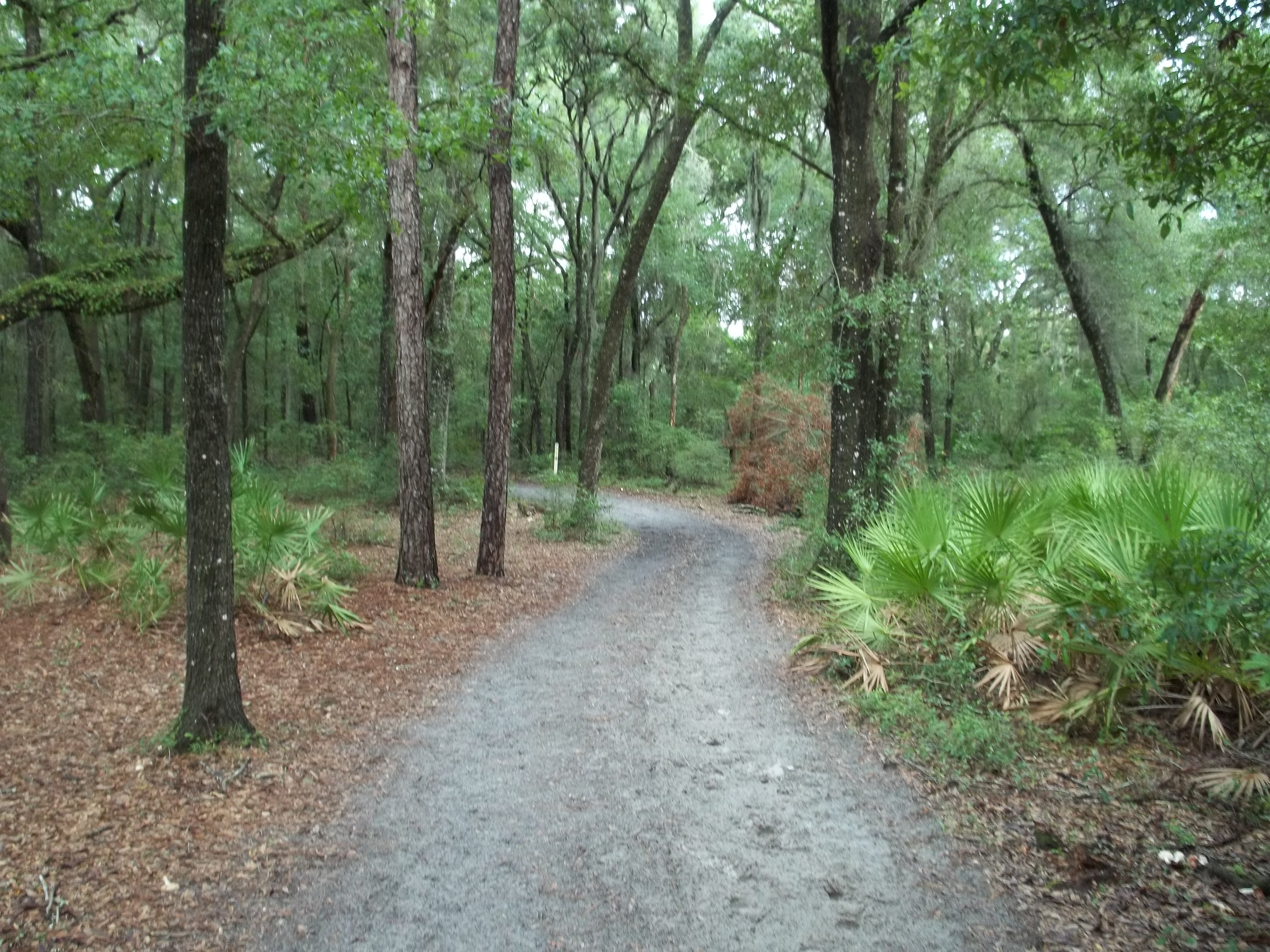
Trail

The forest includes about 150 acres (61 ha) of Ross Prairie, with marshes that hold water during the wet season and dry out during the dry season.

== See also ==
- List of Florida state forests
