= Cody, Florida =

Unincorporated community in Florida, US

Coordinates: 30°21′39″N 84°03′04″W

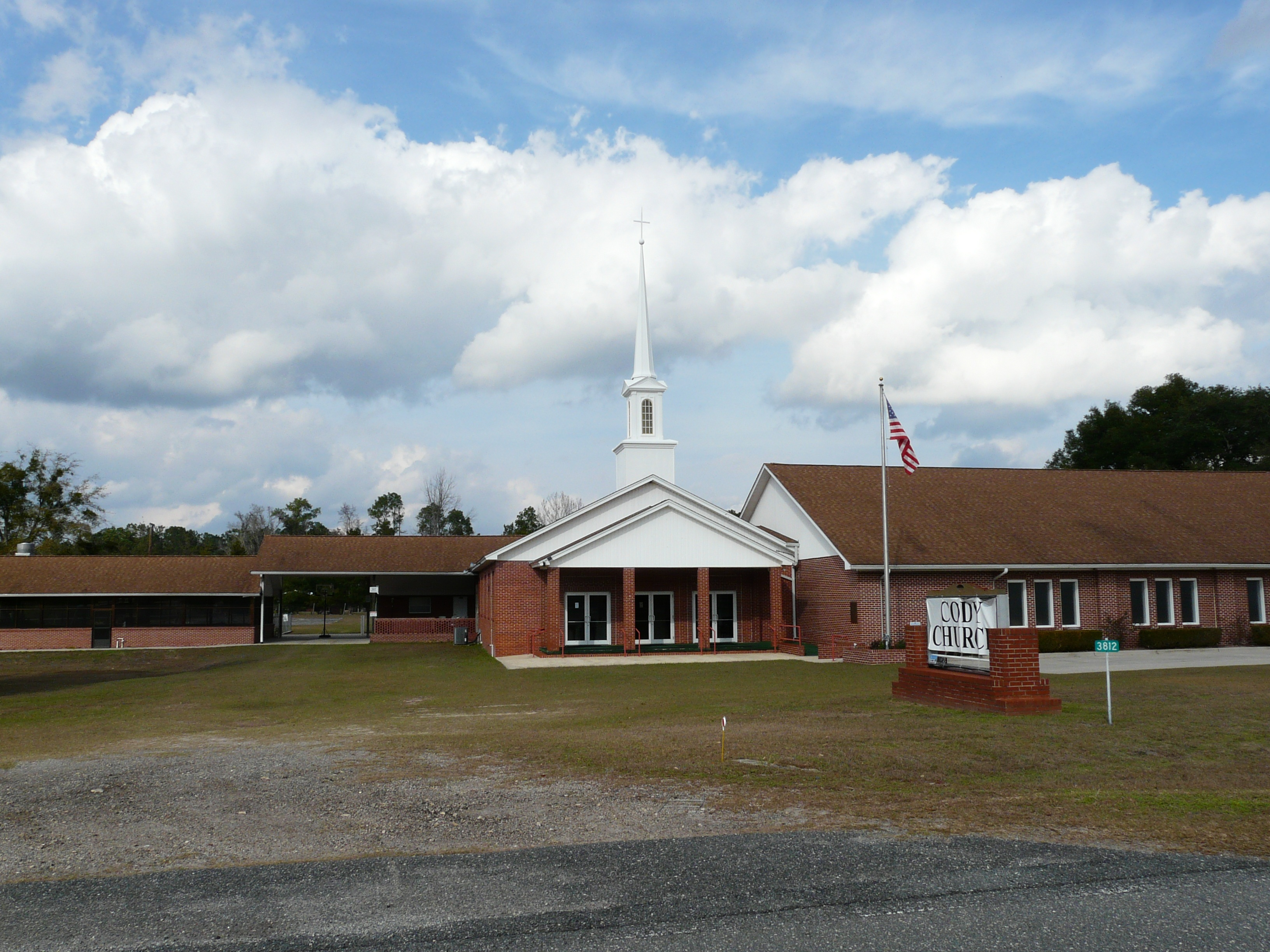
Cody Church

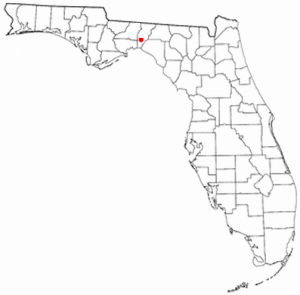
Location of Cody, Florida

Cody is an unincorporated community in western Jefferson County, Florida, United States. It is west of Wacissa near the Leon County/Jefferson County line.

Cody was serviced by the Florida Central Railroad, and had its own post office from 1912 through 1937.

Points of interest near Cody include the Plank Road State Forest, the St. Marks River State Park and the Natural Bridge Battlefield Historic State Park. The elevation of Cody is 33 feet.

== Education ==
Jefferson County Schools operates public schools, including Jefferson County Middle / High School.
