= Big Shoals State Forest =

State forest in Florida, United States

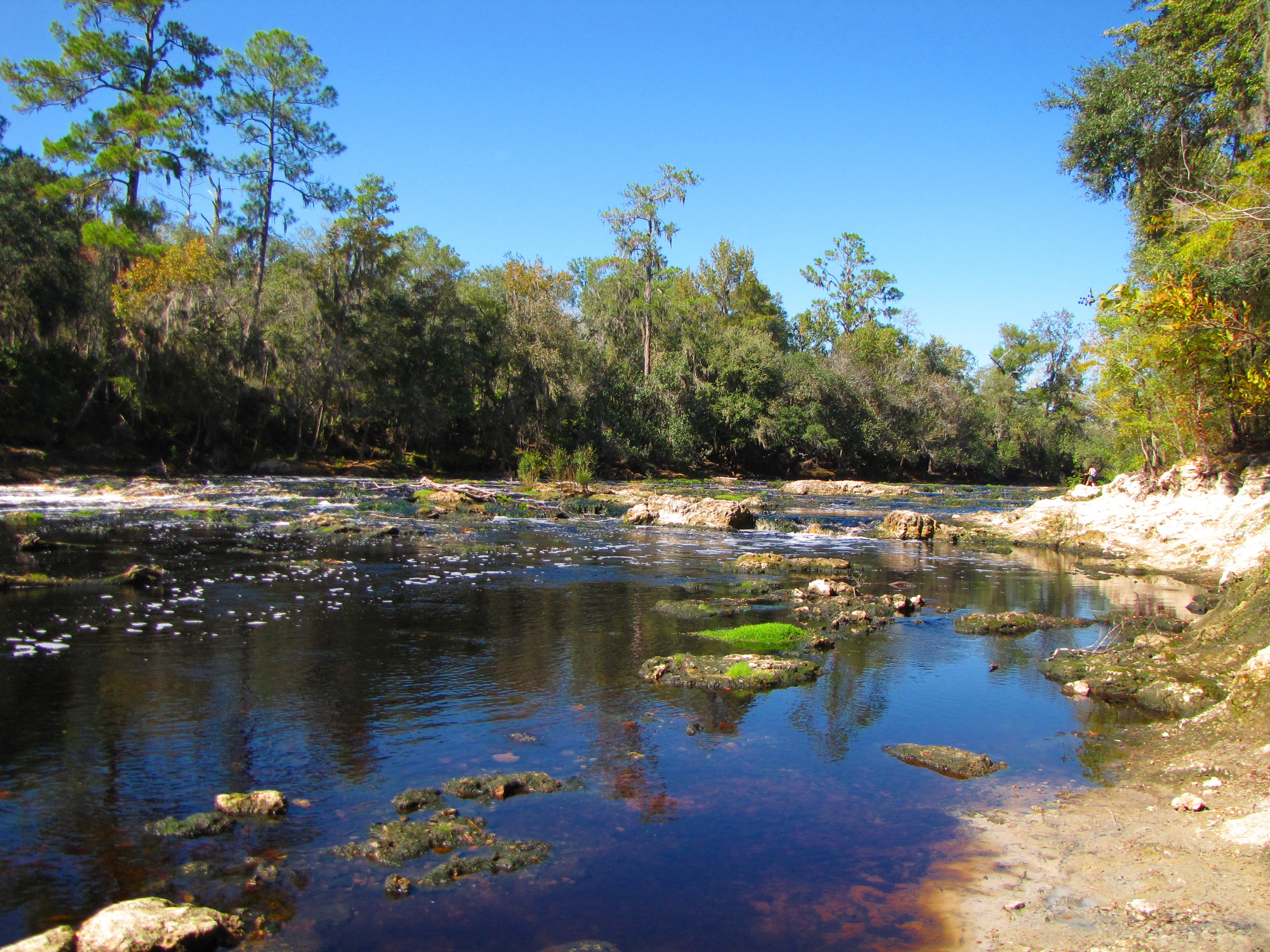

- Location within Florida
- Location: Hamilton County, Florida, US
- Nearest city: White Springs
- Coordinates: 30.342176°N 82.707751°W
- Area: 1,629 acres (659 ha)

Big Shoals State Forest is a protected area of 1,629 acres (659 ha) just east of White Springs, Florida and adjacent to Big Shoals State Park in Hamilton County. The state forest area comprises the north part of the 3,919-acre (1,586 ha) Big Shoals Public Lands and contains the largest area of whitewater in Florida. It is in the area of the Suwannee River.

== See also ==
- List of Florida state forests
- List of Florida state parks
