= Myakka State Forest =

State forest in North Port, Florida, U.S.

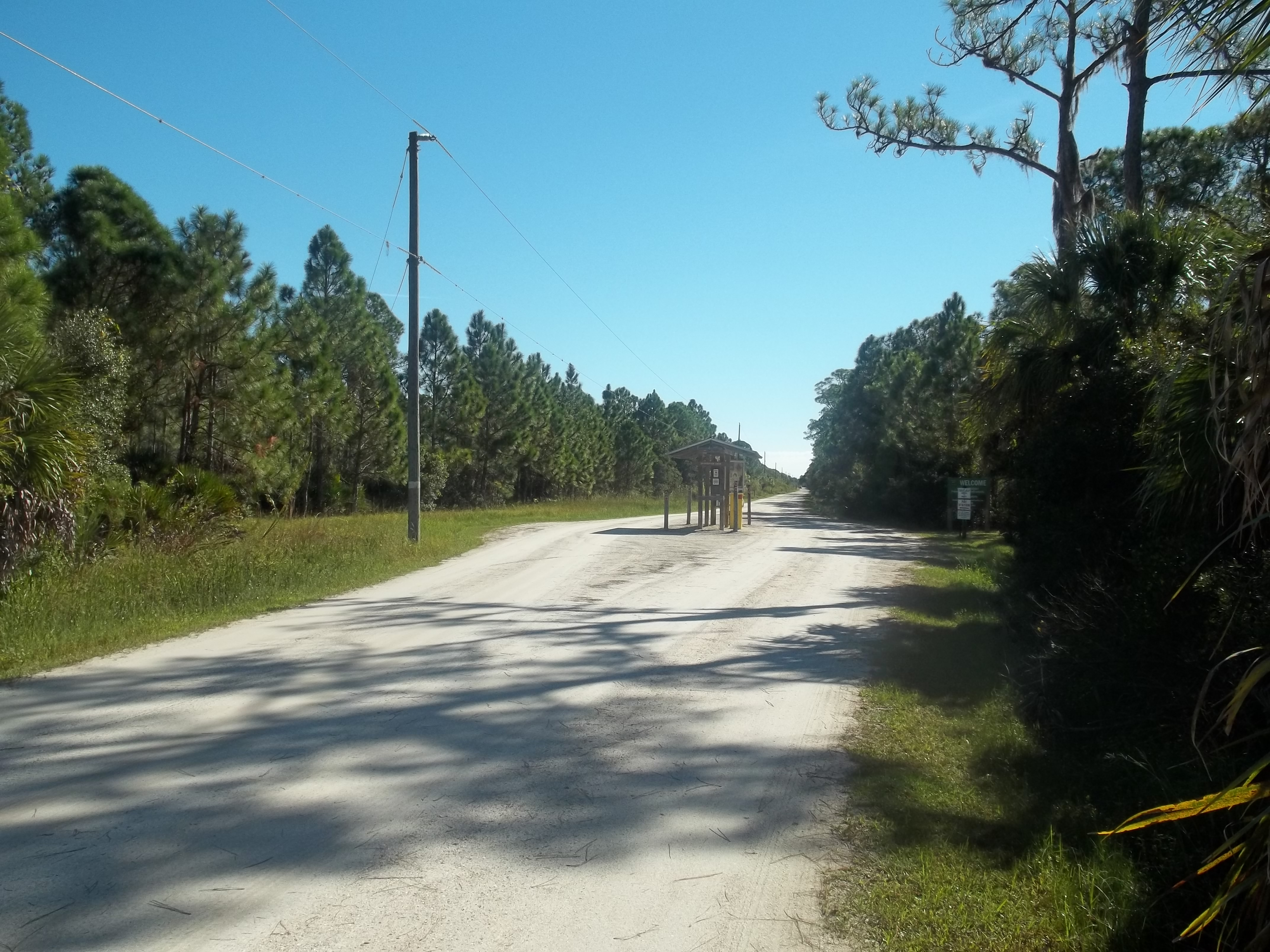

- Location within Florida
- Location: Sarasota County, Florida
- Nearest city: North Port
- Coordinates: 26°58′48.23″N 82°16′51.87″W
- Area: 8,593 acres (34.77 km^{2})
- Established: 1995
- Governing body: Florida Forest Service

The Myakka State Forest is in the U.S. state of Florida. The 8,593-acre (35 km^{2}) forest is located on the southwest coast, in North Port. It has hiking and bicycle trails as well as a paddlecraft boat launch. As of 2025, admission is $2 per car. It is at 2000 South River Rd.

Myakkahatchee Creek, also known as Big Slough, enters the northeastern part of the forest and flows into the Myakka River.

== See also ==
- List of Florida state forests
- List of Florida state parks

== References and external links ==
Media related to Myakka State Forest at Wikimedia Commons

- Myakka State Forest: Florida Division of Forestry- FDACS

Specific
