= John M. Bethea State Forest =

State forest in Florida, United States

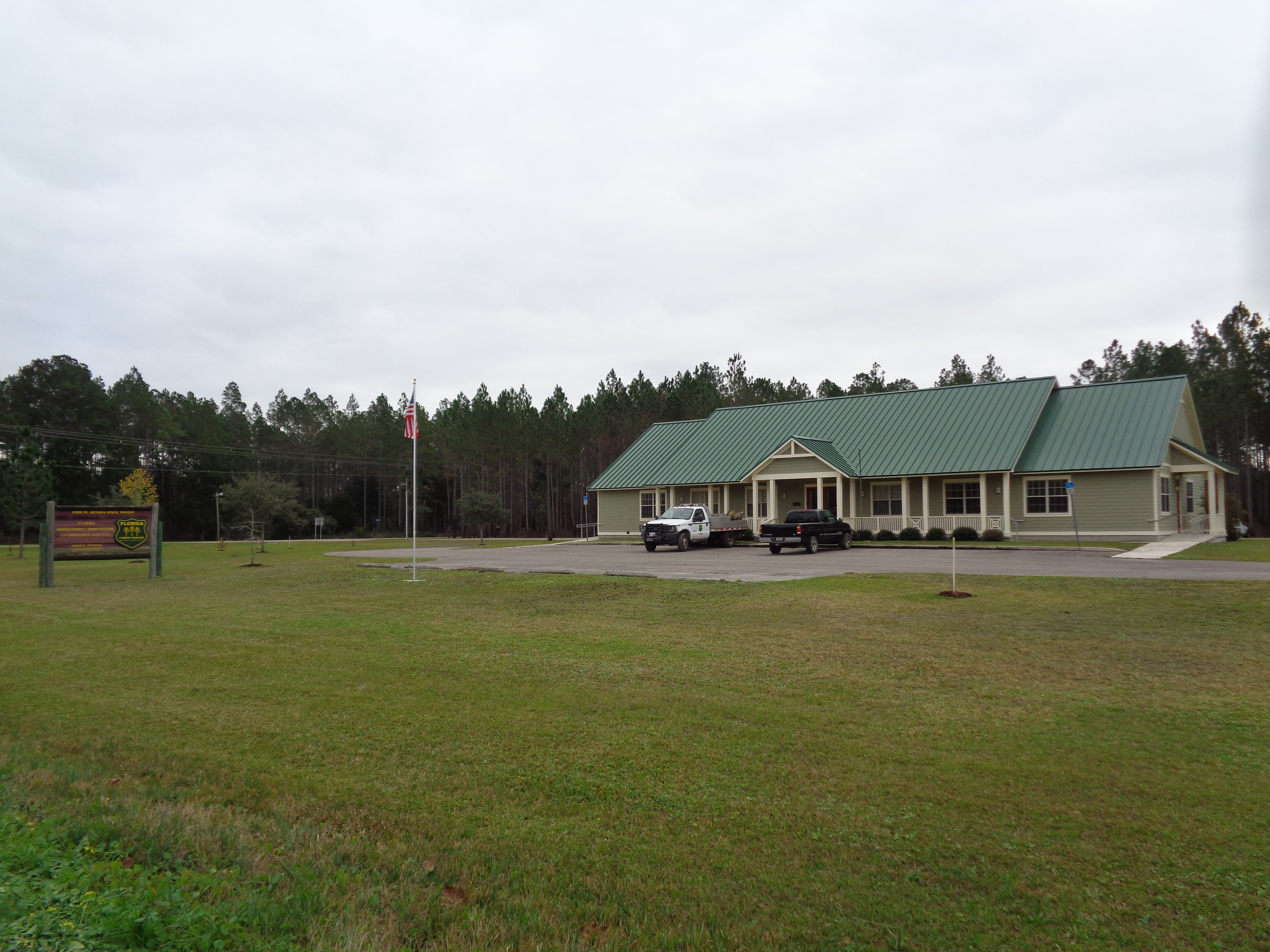
- Office for the John M. Bethea State Forest

- Location within Florida Location within the United States
- Location: Baker County, Florida
- Nearest city: Sanderson, Florida
- Coordinates: 30.50°N 82.31°W
- Area: 37,736 acres (152.71 km^{2})
- Established: 2001
- Governing body: Florida Department of Agriculture and Consumer Services and the Florida Forest Service

John M. Bethea State Forest is a 37,736-acre state forest north of Sanderson, Florida, in northern Baker County near the Florida/Georgia border. It provides a wildlife corridor between the Okefenokee National Wildlife Refuge and the Osceola National Forest. The area was acquired by the State of Florida in 2001, and was named after a former employee of The Florida Forest Service who served as State Forester between 1970 and 1987.

John M. Bethea State Forest land has been used for timber production, naval stores, and livestock grazing. The primary natural forest community in the State Forest is mesic flatwoods and basin swamp, with wet flatwoods, dome swamp, floodplain forest and basin marsh making up the remainder of the area. Some alteration of the lands had occurred prior to state ownership to increase timber production. The Florida Forest Service will focus on restoring areas to historical status where possible.

The forest includes about 3 miles (4.8 km) of frontage along the St. Marys River.

== Recreation ==
The forest offers access for recreational activities such as hiking, camping, hunting, horseback riding, and fishing.

== See also ==
- List of Florida state forests
