= Cottage Hill State Forest =

State forest in Florida, United States

Coordinates: 30.640°N 87.306°W

- Location: Escambia County, Florida
- Nearest city: Pensacola, FL
- Area: 31 acres (13 ha)
- Governing body: Florida Department of Agriculture and Consumer Services and the Florida Forest Service

Cottage Hill State Forest is located in Escambia County, Florida. In 2013 it was reported that the lands might be sold to raise money.

== See also ==
- List of Florida state forests
