= Pine Log =

Pine Log may refer to:

- Rydal, Georgia, once called Pine Log, Georgia
- Pine Log State Forest in Florida
