= Kissimmee Bend State Forest =

State forest in Florida, United States

- Location within Florida Location within the United States
- Interactive map of Kissimmee Bend State Forest
- Location: Okeechobee County, Florida, United States
- Nearest city: Okeechobee
- Coordinates: 27°31′30″N 81°05′38″W
- Area: 1,992 acres (806 ha)
- Established: 2020; 6 years ago (Note: Sources differ on when the purchase closed. The Florida Forest Service's forest page gives April 2019, the 2023 Florida Forever plan gives 2019, the Open Space Institute gives 2018 for its acquisition and transfer, and the 2025 management plan gives April 2020, matching the lease date.)
- Governing body: Florida Forest Service
- Website: fdacs.gov

Kissimmee Bend State Forest is a Florida state forest of 1,992 acres (806 ha) in Okeechobee County, within the headwaters of the Everglades and the basin of the Kissimmee River. It is named for a pronounced western bend in the river just west of the property. The forest adjoins Kissimmee Prairie Preserve State Park on the north and units of the Everglades Headwaters National Wildlife Refuge and Conservation Area on the east and southeast.

== History ==
The Wold family managed the property for cattle grazing from 1976 until the Open Space Institute, with support from the Wyss Foundation, bought it for conservation. The institute acquired the larger Triple Diamond Ranch, nearly 4,000 acres (1,600 ha), and transferred it to the Florida Department of Environmental Protection and the United States Fish and Wildlife Service. The state's share was purchased through the Florida Forever program: on August 16, 2017, Governor Rick Scott and the Florida Cabinet approved buying 1,992 acres (806 ha) within the Triple Diamond project for $4.2 million, with the Florida Forest Service named as manager. The Forest Service's management lease took effect on April 13, 2020. Its ten-year management plan was approved on June 16, 2025.

== Habitats ==
Kissimmee Bend State Forest includes dry prairie, depression marsh, and other wetland habitats. Dry prairie, a globally imperiled community, is the main natural community and covers about 708 acres (287 ha), while slough marsh, wet prairie, and depression marsh together cover about 1,144 acres (463 ha). Its water resources are seasonal ponds; it has no perennial ponds or streams.

== Wildlife ==
Listed species recorded on the forest include the endangered Florida grasshopper sparrow, the crested caracara, and the gopher tortoise, and other wildlife includes the American alligator, white-tailed deer, wild turkey, wood stork, and swallow-tailed kite. No archaeological sites had been recorded on the property as of 2025.

== Operation ==
The Board of Trustees of the Internal Improvement Trust Fund holds title to the land, and the Florida Forest Service manages it as a multiple-use forest under a state lease. The whole forest is also the Kissimmee Bend Unit of the Everglades Headwaters Wildlife Management Area, where the Florida Fish and Wildlife Conservation Commission regulates hunting.

As of 2026, the forest was open for day use from sunrise to sunset with a $2 admission fee, for hiking, biking, and seasonal hunting. Visitors park at the entrance to the adjoining national wildlife refuge off NW 256th Street, and primitive camping is planned.
