= Okaloacoochee Slough State Forest =

State forest in Florida, United States

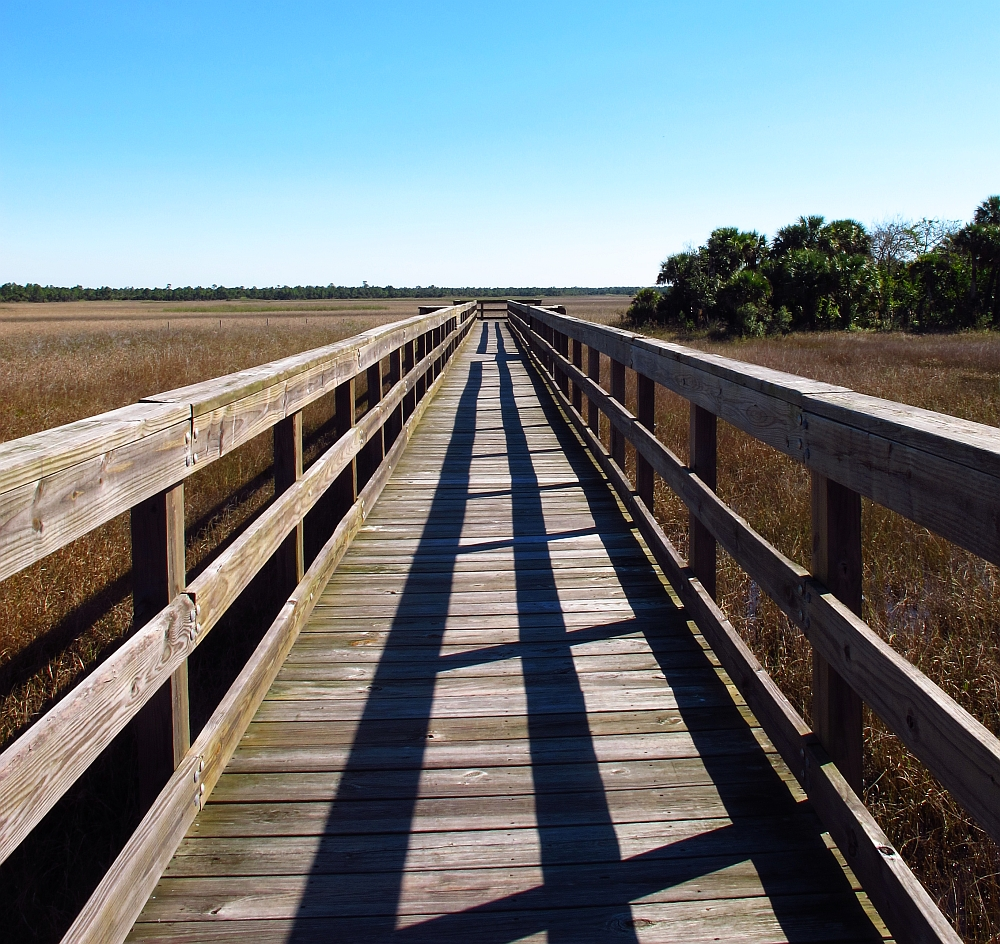
- Viewing area at Okaloacoochee Slough State Forest
- Interactive map of Okaloacoochee Slough State Forest
- Nearest city: Felda
- Coordinates: 26°35′43″N 81°22′20″W
- Area: 32,039 acres (12,966 ha)
- Camp sites: Primitive (2 locations)
- Hiking trails: 2
- Other information: Hiking, biking, nature photography, fishing, and hunting.

The Okaloacoochee Slough State Forest is in the U.S. state of Florida. The 32,039-acre (130 km^{2}) forest is located in the southwestern part of the state, near Felda. The forest gets its name from the Muskogee and when translated may mean "small bad water" or "boggy slough."

== See also ==
- List of Florida state forests
- List of Florida state parks
