= Watson Island State Forest =

Forest in Florida, United States

Coordinates: 29.892°N 81.584°W

Watson Island State Forest in St. Johns County, Florida includes 199 acres of bottomland forest, 129 acres of wet flatwoods, 124 acres of mesic flatwoods, 26 acres of floodplain, 23 acres of baygall forest, 2 acres of floodplain marsh, 2 acres of ruderal and 1 acre of dome swamp.

== See also ==
- List of Florida state forests
- List of Florida state parks
