= Wakulla State Forest =

Protected area in the U.S. state of Florida

Coordinates: 30°16′5.2″N 84°19′25.84″W

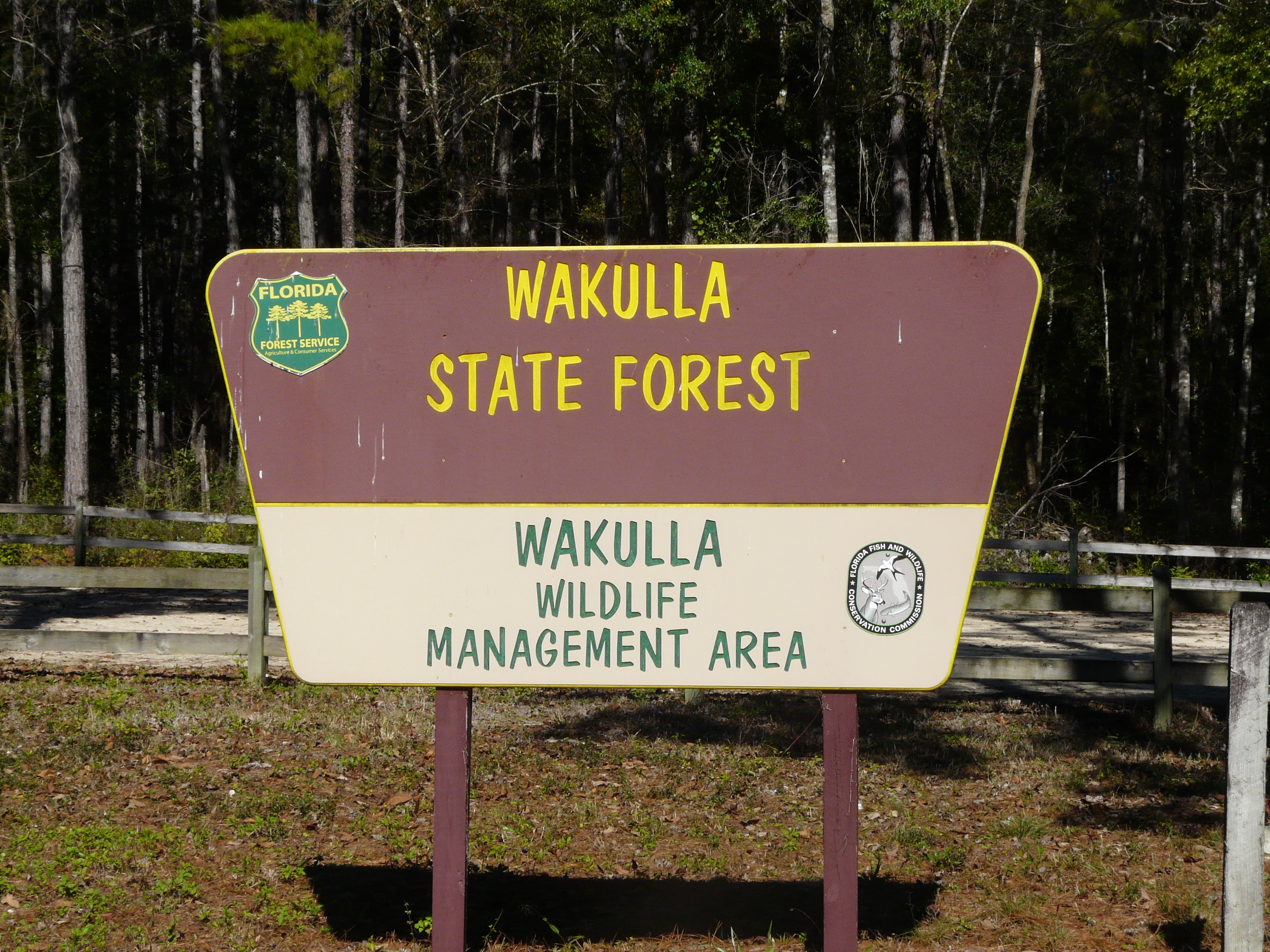
- Interactive map of Wakulla State Forest
- Location: Leon and Wakulla counties, Florida
- Nearest city: Tallahassee
- Area: 4,897 acres (1,982 ha)
- Governing body: Florida Department of Agriculture and Consumer Services

The Wakulla State Forest is in the U.S. state of Florida. The 4,897-acre (20 km^{2}) forest is located in the panhandle, near Tallahassee; it includes a major tract in Wakulla County, and two small tracts, one of them the former Woodville State Forest, in Leon County. The forest is also a Wildlife Management Area managed by the Florida Fish and Wildlife Conservation Commission.

Part of the forest lies within the groundwater recharge area for Wakulla Springs. McBride Slough flows through the forest and joins the Wakulla River.

== See also ==
- List of Florida state forests
- List of Florida state parks
