= Four Creeks State Forest =

Park in Nassau County, Florida, US

- Location within Florida
- Location: Nassau County, Florida
- Nearest city: Callahan, Florida
- Coordinates: 30°34′31″N 81°44′24″W
- Area: 13,658 acres (5,527 ha)
- Other information: hiking, hunting, fishing, canoeing, kayaking, nature study, bicycling and horseback riding

Four Creeks State Forest is a 13,658-acre (5,527 ha) protected area in Nassau County, Florida. It includes the 13,060-acre Four Creeks State Forest and Wildlife Management Area. The site is located between Callahan and Yulee, Florida along the Duval/Nassau County line.

The area is named for the four creeks that traverse the property: Alligator (Mills), Thomas, Boggy and Plummer Creeks, which join to form the headwaters of the Nassau River.

== See also ==
- List of Florida state forests
