= Boulogne, Florida =

Unincorporated community in Florida, U.S.

Boulogne is an unincorporated community in Nassau County, Florida, United States. Boulogne is located in the northern part of the county, near the St. Marys River. Highways passing through the town are US 1/US 23/US 301/State Road 15 and CR 121.

Boulogne was once an incorporated municipality, but its status was revoked by the State of Florida in the 1960s because of corruption issues with the town and state government. Since that time, no attempt has been made to reestablish the municipality.

Boulogne is located at 30°46′17″N 81°58′34″W (30.7714, -81.9761). The Ralph E. Simmons Memorial State Forest is located near the community.
