= Sandy Creek State Forest =

State forest in Florida, United States

Coordinates: 30.326°N 85.382°W

Sandy Creek State Forest is a state forest in Florida. It was acquired by the state in 2025, but is not yet open to the public.

It covers 12,243 acres (49.55 km^{2}) in the St. Andrew Bay watershed in Bay County, Florida.

The area is home to gopher tortoise, Florida black bear, reticulated flatwoods salamander and dark-headed hatpins.

== See also ==
- List of types of formally designated forests
