= Belmore State Forest =

State forest in Florida, United States

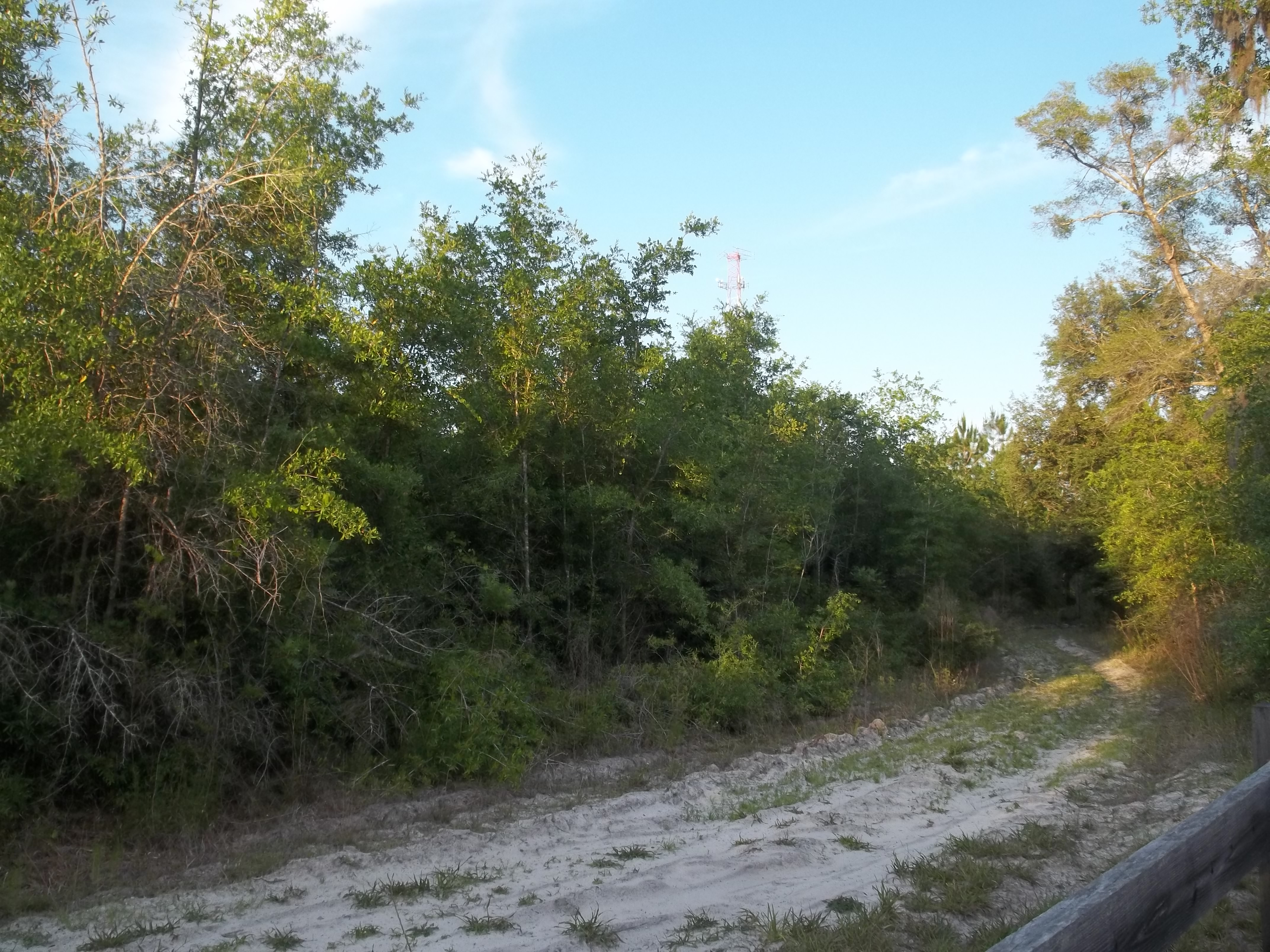

- Location within Florida
- Location: Clay County, Florida
- Nearest city: Green Cove Springs, Florida
- Coordinates: 29°51′06″N 81°52′38″W
- Area: 12,262 acres (4,962 ha)
- Other information: Hiking, biking, horseback riding, hunting, fishing

Belmore State Forest is located in Clay County, Florida.

The forest comprises two separated tracts totaling 12,262 acres. The northern Satsuma Tract abuts a portion of Camp Blanding, and the southern 8,737-acre Ates Creek Tract is located near the northern part of Etoniah Creek State Forest.

Seepage streams and blackwater creeks have formed ravines throughout the forest, including along Ates Creek and its tributary, Devil's Den Creek.

== See also ==
- List of Florida state forests
- List of Florida state parks
