= Carl Duval Moore State Forest =

State forest in Florida, United States

- Location within Florida
- Location: Putnam County, Florida
- Nearest city: Interlachen, Florida
- Coordinates: 29°36′40″N 81°50′55″W
- Area: 335 acres (136 ha)
- Other information: Hiking, wildlife viewing

Carl Duval Moore State Forest is in the central portion of Putnam County, Florida east of Interlachen, Florida. The northern tract of the state forest is located beside Up and Down Lake and includes a 1.5 mile trail. A second southern tract is located by the northeast bank of Hardesty Lake. In 1993, the property was deeded by the Carl Duval Moore estate to the state of Florida to be used for public purposes as a forest.

Up and Down Lake receives most of its water from runoff from the surrounding uplands.

== See also ==
- List of Florida state forests
- List of Florida state parks
