= List of Florida state forests =

Forests in Florida

Florida State Forests
- A trail at Jennings State Forest
- Area: More than 1,236,000 acres (500,000 ha)
- Established: 1936; 90 years ago
- Visitors: More than 2.2 million (in 2016)
- Governing body: Florida Department of Agriculture and Consumer Services, Florida Forest Service
- Website: www.fdacs.gov/Forest-Wildfire/Our-Forests/State-Forests

The Florida state forest system consists of 38 state forests and one working ranch managed by the Florida Forest Service (FFS), a division of the Florida Department of Agriculture and Consumer Services. Together they cover more than 1,236,000 acres (500,000 ha) (Note: The Florida Forest Service's figure of 1,236,322 acres is a current system total. The areas in the table below come from each forest's most recent management plan and do not include land bought since, so they add up to about 1,181,000 acres.) in 39 of Florida's 67 counties. (Note: Count of the counties named in the table below.) The forests are managed for multiple uses such as timber, outdoor recreation, habitat for game and nongame wildlife, and the protection of water resources and archaeological and historical sites. Most of the forests are also run as wildlife management areas under a cooperative agreement with the Florida Fish and Wildlife Conservation Commission, and they offer hiking, camping, paddling and designated off-highway vehicle trails.

Florida's state forests and state parks began as a single program. In 1935 the Legislature authorized the Florida Board of Forestry to manage forests and parks that the federal government had acquired and turned over to the state, and each tract was assigned to one system or the other by its "highest use": land suited to timber and lacking unusual scenic, historic or botanical value went to forestry. The first state forest, Pine Log State Forest, was bought from the Henderson-Waits Lumber Company in 1936, and Cary State Forest followed in 1937. Three more began as federal land-use and resettlement projects of the 1930s, Blackwater River, Welaka and Withlacoochee, and came to the state by lease or deed between 1938 and 1958. Most of the system is far younger. Purchases in almost every year from 1987 to 2009, funded through the Conservation and Recreation Lands Trust Fund and the Preservation 2000 program, brought the number of state forests to 35, and later land has come through Florida Forever. Of the 39 units in this list, 29 were first acquired after 1989. The newest, Sandy Creek State Forest in Bay County, was bought in 2025.

This list covers all 38 state forests managed as of 2026, as well as Babcock Ranch Preserve, a Florida Heritage Working Ranch that the FFS has managed alongside them since 2016. The units range in size from Blackwater River, at more than 226,000 acres the largest state forest in Florida, to the 58-acre Holopaw State Forest. For each forest the table gives the year the state first acquired it, its counties, its area, the streams and lakes on or beside it, and a short description of its landscape and recreation.

== Interactive map ==
Florida Forest Service boundaries for state forests (Green) and Babcock Ranch Preserve (Brown)

== State forests ==
Florida state forests and Babcock Ranch Preserve
| Forest name | Image | Acquired (Note: The year the state of Florida acquired, or first leased, the parcel that forms the initial area of the forest. Where the land was already state-owned, the year it was assigned to the Florida Forest Service is given instead. Later additions are not reflected.) | County and location (Note: Counties are those named in each forest's land management plan. Coordinates mark the centroid of the forest's largest parcel in the Florida Forest Service boundary layer.) | Area (Note: Acreage as stated in each forest's current ten-year land management plan, as of that plan's approval; later acquisitions are not reflected. Figures include sovereign submerged lands where a plan counts them.) | Streams and lakes (Note: Named rivers, creeks, lakes, ponds and canals within or bordering each forest, as listed in its land management plan. Borrow pits are omitted.) | Description (Note: Each description summarizes the forest's land management plan: its main landscape, its waters and its public recreation. Babcock Ranch Preserve's draws on the Florida Forest Service's page for the preserve, and Sandy Creek's on the Department of Environmental Protection's announcement of the purchase.) |
|---|---|---|---|---|---|---|
| Babcock Ranch Preserve (Note: Babcock Ranch Preserve is designated a Florida Heritage Working Ranch rather than a state forest. The Florida Forest Service took over its management on August 1, 2016, and administers it alongside the state forests.) | A brown-and-white longhorn cow walks across a green pasture, with a second cow partly hidden behind it. | 2006 | Charlotte; 26.8578°N 81.6555°W | 67,618.81 acres (27,364.4 ha) | Telegraph Creek | A working cattle ranch north of the Caloosahatchee River, with improved range, pinelands, dry prairie and cypress swamps. Telegraph Swamp, a cypress strand on the western half, drains toward the Caloosahatchee and Charlotte Harbor. Public access is by a hiking trail, a horse trail and an eco-tour, with hunting on part of the preserve. |
| Belmore | A brown sign reading "Belmore State Forest, Satsuma Tract, Day Use Only", with picnic, horseback riding and hiking symbols, stands in front of a wooden rail fence. | 2004 | Clay; 29.8495°N 81.8649°W | 12,262.30 acres (4,962.4 ha) | Ates Creek, Devil's Den Creek, Bull Creek | Two tracts in central Clay County, much of them pine flatwoods, in the Black Creek watershed. On the Ates Creek Tract, Ates Creek and its tributary Devil's Den Creek have cut a mosaic of ravines. Forest roads and firelines are open for hiking, biking and horseback riding, with recreation areas on both tracts. |
| Big Shoals | A sign reading "Big Shoals State Forest, Big Shoals Wildlife Management Area" and a small address sign stand beside a dirt driveway leading into pine and hardwood woods. | 1986 | Hamilton; 30.3480°N 82.7104°W | 1,814.47 acres (734.3 ha) | Four Mile Branch, Long Branch | Mostly pine flatwoods, about half a mile from the Big Shoals rapids on the Suwannee River and connected to the river by Big Shoals State Park. Four Mile Branch crosses the forest on its way to the Suwannee. The Woodpecker Trail and part of a horse trail that continues into the state park cross the forest. |
| Blackwater River | Two tall Atlantic white cedar trunks rise from a bank of exposed roots beside a concrete road bridge. | 1938 (Note: Leased from the federal government in November 1938; the United States Forest Service deeded the land to the state in 1955.) | Santa Rosa, Okaloosa; 30.8729°N 86.8359°W | 226,659.52 acres (91,725.9 ha) | Blackwater River, Sweetwater Creek, Juniper Creek, Coldwater Creek, Bear Lake, Hurricane Lake, Krul Lake | Upland longleaf pine forest and sandhill drained by the Blackwater River and its three main tributaries, part of a longleaf landscape shared with Conecuh National Forest and Eglin Air Force Base that supports a large population of red-cockaded woodpeckers. About 200 miles of trail serve hikers, cyclists, riders and off-highway vehicles, and there are ten developed recreation areas. |
| Carl Duval Moore (Note: The Florida Forest Service's full name for the unit is Carl Duval Moore State Forest and Park.) | | 1993 | Putnam; 29.6061°N 81.8494°W | 336 acres (136.0 ha) | Up and Down Lake, Hardesty Lake, Alligator Creek | Two small tracts of sandhill and pine flatwoods near Interlachen; the forest surrounds almost all of Up and Down Lake and borders Hardesty Lake. A 1.2-mile hiking trail with tree identification signs leads to an observation dock on Up and Down Lake. |
| Cary | A brown "Welcome to Cary State Forest" sign on a brick base stands on a grassy roadside beneath tall pines, beside a highway and a water-filled ditch. | 1937 (Note: The plan dates the forest's establishment to 1937; its original parcels were bought between 1935 and 1942.) | Duval, Nassau; 30.3866°N 81.8760°W | 13,384.71 acres (5,416.6 ha) | Thomas Creek | Wet and mesic pine flatwoods, cypress domes and basin swamp in the watersheds of the St. Johns, St. Marys and Nassau rivers, with intact bottomland forest along Thomas Creek. The main recreation area has a campground, forest roads are open for hiking, biking and horseback riding, and the Jacksonville-Baldwin Rail Trail crosses the south end. |
| Charles H. Bronson | A gravel drive passes wooden rail fences toward a shaded grove of oaks and cabbage palms hung with Spanish moss. | 2008 | Seminole, Orange; 28.5988°N 81.0246°W | 11,246.24 acres (4,551.2 ha) | St. Johns River, Turkey Creek, Christmas Creek, Buscombe Creek, Joshua Creek | Wet hammock and pine flatwoods beside the St. Johns River, which forms part of the eastern boundary, crossed by several creeks running to the river. There are 19 miles of hiking trail, including 7.5 miles of the Florida Trail, 20 miles of horse trail and primitive campsites on the Joshua Creek Tract. |
| Etoniah | Tall longleaf pines stand over a grassy, needle-strewn path; one trunk is marked with blue and orange paint blazes. | 1995 | Putnam; 29.7393°N 81.8222°W | 8,876.30 acres (3,592.1 ha) | Etonia Creek, Falling Branch, Rice Creek, George's Lake | Rolling sandhill and scrub cut by Etonia Creek, Falling Branch and Rice Creek, whose slopes rise 40 to 60 feet and shelter plants typical of the Piedmont and southern Appalachians. The forest holds a population of the federally endangered Etonia rosemary and has trails for hiking and horseback riding. |
| Four Creeks | | 2005 | Nassau; 30.5638°N 81.7452°W | 13,658 acres (5,527.2 ha) | Thomas Creek, Alligator Creek, Mills Creek, Boggy Creek, Plummer Creek, Nassau River | Pine flatwoods and floodplain swamp crossed by four creeks, all navigable by small boats, that join at the east end of the forest to form the Nassau River. Four canoe and kayak landings, three recreation areas, a primitive campground and more than 43 miles of unpaved roads serve paddlers, hikers, riders and cyclists. |
| Goethe | A narrow, needle-covered footpath winds through dense saw palmetto beneath a stand of tall slash pines. | 1992 | Levy, Alachua; 29.3940°N 82.7676°W | 54,158.80 acres (21,917.3 ha) | Black Prong, Cow Creek, North Prong, Ten Mile Creek, Horse Hole Creek, Deer Pen Pond, Buck Island Pond, Watermelon Pond | A large area of natural longleaf pine flatwoods, where old pines scarred by naval stores tapping provide most of the natural nest cavities for the forest's red-cockaded woodpeckers; the Goethe Giant, a large bald cypress, grows in a wet hammock. Trails start from seven trailheads, and camping is offered in three places. |
| Holopaw | A row of tall pines stands behind a wire fence at the edge of a mowed, grassy field under a clear blue sky. | 1961 | Osceola; 28.1387°N 81.0369°W | 58 acres (23.5 ha) | None | A 58-acre plantation of slash pine beside U.S. Route 192 near Holopaw, planted between 1980 and 1983. The Forest Service uses it as a demonstration area to show landowners how a typical Florida flatwoods site can be managed for timber. |
| Indian Lake | A brown sign reading "Welcome to Indian Lake State Forest, Please protect your forest" on a stacked stone base beside a two-lane highway. | 2007 | Marion; 29.2679°N 82.0657°W | 4,567.65 acres (1,848.5 ha) | Indian Lake | Mostly sandhill on karst, with at least 83 dry sinkholes; Indian Lake is a deep sinkhole lake connected directly to the Floridan aquifer, and the surrounding uplands help protect the water quality of Silver Springs. The 1.4-mile Bear-N-Oak Trail loops around the lake, and the forest also has 11.6 miles of horse trail and a campground. |
| Jennings | A brown "Welcome to Jennings State Forest" sign on a low stone base sits at the corner of a wooden rail fence, with pines and hardwoods behind. | 1990 | Clay, Duval; 30.1405°N 81.9094°W | 25,152.12 acres (10,178.7 ha) | North Fork Black Creek, Yellow Water Creek, Long Branch Creek | Pine flatwoods, swamps and bottomland forest drained by the North Fork of Black Creek and its tributaries, about 8 miles of which can be paddled; three seepage streams have cut ravines. Hiking and horse trails leave from the Old Jennings Recreation Area, and the Hammock Campground has ten drive-up sites. |
| John M. Bethea | A single-story office building with a green metal roof and a front porch, two pickup trucks parked in front, a flagpole flying the U.S. flag, and pine woods behind. | 2001 | Baker; 30.4790°N 82.3491°W | 37,736 acres (15,271.2 ha) | St. Marys River, Swamp Creek, Little River, Lake Holes Branch, Moccasin Creek, Cross Branch | Largely pine flatwoods with large basin swamps, lying between the Osceola National Forest and the Okefenokee Swamp, with about 3 miles of frontage on the St. Marys River. A 13-mile horse trail uses forest roads and firelines, and primitive camping is by permit. |
| Kissimmee Bend | | 2020 | Okeechobee; 27.5250°N 81.0938°W | 1,992.12 acres (806.2 ha) | None | Mainly dry prairie, a globally imperiled grassland, with marsh and hammock, in the Everglades Headwaters next to Kissimmee Prairie Preserve State Park and a national wildlife refuge; it has no permanent streams or ponds. Hiking is on service roads from a trailhead on the refuge, and the forest is open for hunting, wildlife viewing and night sky viewing. |
| Lake George | A brown "Welcome to Lake George State Forest, Please protect your forest" sign stands beside a rough gray boulder near a paved road through pine and palm woods. | 1993 | Volusia; 29.1454°N 81.4757°W | 21,185.99 acres (8,573.7 ha) | St. Johns River, Lake George, Morrison Creek, Deep Creek, Stone Pond | Floodplain swamp, wet hammock and marsh along about 3.5 miles of the St. Johns River and 1.75 miles of Lake George, with a mosaic of wetlands inland. The Bluffton Recreation Area on the river has a hiking trail, picnic shelters, a fishing pier and a canoe and kayak launch. |
| Lake Talquin | A brown sign reading "Lake Talquin State Forest, W. D. Lines Trails", with hiking, bicycling, picnic shelter and camping symbols, stands in a grassy area beside a road. | 1977 | Leon, Gadsden, Liberty, Wakulla; 30.4526°N 84.4326°W | 19,174.59 acres (7,759.7 ha) | Ochlockonee River, Lake Talquin, Little River | Upland pine and hardwood forest around much of Lake Talquin, a reservoir on the Ochlockonee River; deep ravines and steepheads on nearly every tract hold plants and animals seldom found elsewhere in Florida. Boat ramps, campgrounds and trails are spread across the tracts, including the nature trails at Bear Creek and the lakeside Bloxham and High Bluff recreation areas. |
| Lake Wales Ridge | A small pond ringed by dry tan grasses and young pines, with a line of taller pines and oaks under a cloudy sky. | 1984 | Polk; 27.6764°N 81.4463°W | 26,579.49 acres (10,756.3 ha) | Lake Arbuckle, Lake Godwin, Livingston Creek, Reedy Creek, Isabel Creek, Arbuckle Creek, Lake Weohyakapka | Ancient sand pine, oak and rosemary scrub in a little-disturbed mix of flatwoods, wetlands and lakes on the Lake Wales Ridge, in tracts bordering Lake Arbuckle and Lake Weohyakapka. The Florida Trail Association maintains more than 22 miles of loop trail on the Arbuckle Tract, and horseback riding is allowed on both main tracts. |
| Little Big Econ | A wooden sign on two posts names the Florida Department of Agriculture and Consumer Services and Little Big Econ State Forest beside a Florida Forest Service shield, on a roadside lawn. | 1993 | Seminole; 28.6876°N 81.0666°W | 10,336.25 acres (4,182.9 ha) | Econlockhatchee River, St. Johns River | Floodplain marsh, hammock and pine flatwoods along about 17 miles of the Econlockhatchee River, an Outstanding Florida Water, with the St. Johns River on the eastern edge. The river is a designated paddling trail, and the forest has nearly 15 miles of hiking trail, including part of the Florida Trail, 9.3 miles of horse trail and 12.1 miles of bike trail. |
| Matanzas | A brown-and-white sign reading "Matanzas State Forest, Matanzas Wildlife Management Area" stands in front of dense, shrubby woods. | 2003 | St. Johns; 29.7282°N 81.2808°W | 4,699.73 acres (1,901.9 ha) | Matanzas River, Cedar Creek | A gradient from scrubby and pine flatwoods through hammock to 2.5 miles of undeveloped salt marsh on the Matanzas River, part of which is an Important Bird Area. Forest roads are open for hiking, biking and horseback riding, and Cedar Creek Campground has four primitive sites. |
| Myakka | A wide, sandy road leads between pine woods and palmettos to a small roofed information kiosk. | 1995 | Sarasota; 26.9753°N 82.2781°W | 8,593 acres (3,477.5 ha) | Myakka River, Big Slough (Myakkahatchee Creek), Rock Creek (Ainger Creek) | Pine flatwoods dotted with depression marshes, with the Myakka River, a state-designated wild and scenic river, crossing the northeast corner and small tidal creeks draining to it. More than 30 miles of marked trails are open to hikers, cyclists and riders, and there are drive-up, hike-in and paddle-in campsites. |
| Newnans Lake | A brown sign reading "Newnans Lake State Forest, West Hiking Trail" with a right-pointing arrow stands on a grassy highway shoulder in front of bare and evergreen trees. | 2015 (Note: The land has been state-owned since 1921; it was assigned to the Florida Forest Service in 2015.) | Alachua; 29.6700°N 82.2693°W | 1,059.26 acres (428.7 ha) | Newnans Lake, Sunnyland Creek, Lakeridge Creek, Lake Forest Creek | Swamp, hammock and pine flatwoods on the western shore of Newnans Lake east of Gainesville, crossed by three creeks that feed the lake. Hiking and biking trails lead from the Lake Pithlachocco Trailhead to the lakeshore, and a shorter interpretive trail passes habitat restoration in the flatwoods. |
| Okaloacoochee Slough | Tall pines and cabbage palms silhouetted against a deep blue twilight sky that glows orange at the horizon. | 1996 | Hendry, Collier; 26.5675°N 81.3432°W | 32,370.04 acres (13,099.7 ha) | Okaloacoochee Slough | Centered on a 16,998-acre (6,879 ha) slough marsh that runs north to south through pine flatwoods, on land whose elevation varies by only about 10 feet; the slough stores water for and feeds the Fakahatchee Strand and Big Cypress National Preserve. More than 27 miles of marked trails and four primitive campgrounds are open to the public. |
| Peace River | | 2014 | DeSoto; 27.1270°N 81.9711°W | 5,047.55 acres (2,042.7 ha) | Peace River, Horse Creek, Aurin Lake | Spans about 9 miles of the Peace River and 7 miles of Horse Creek, including their confluence, with hardwood hammocks, marshes and cypress stands; former ranch pasture is still under a grazing and hay lease. A 2-mile hiking loop and a 6-mile horse trail, open by permit, follow the creek, the river and Aurin Lake. |
| Picayune Strand | A concrete bridge with metal guardrails leads onto a straight, sandy road through low scrub and trees; the front of a red pickup truck is at the left edge. | 1983 | Collier; 26.0688°N 81.5181°W | 74,008 acres (29,950.0 ha) | Faka-Union Canal | Cypress strands and subtropical hammocks on land drained by 183 miles of canals for the Golden Gate Estates subdivision in the 1960s. The Comprehensive Everglades Restoration Plan is rewetting it by plugging canals, removing roadbeds and pumping water back onto the forest. Trails serve hikers, riders and cyclists, with an equestrian campground at Horseshoe. |
| Pine Log | A brown-and-white sign reading "Pine Log State Forest, Pine Log Wildlife Management Area" stands at the edge of a dense stand of tall, thin pines. | 1936 | Bay, Washington; 30.4114°N 85.8567°W | 8,036.82 acres (3,252.4 ha) | Pine Log Creek, Little Crooked Creek, Ditch Branch | Sandhill and pine flatwoods drained by Pine Log Creek, including a slash pine plantation set out in 1937 on an old blueberry farm. Eight miles of the Florida Trail cross the forest, and the Sand Pond Recreation Area has a campground with hookups and two fishing piers. |
| Plank Road | A gravel road leads into a forest of tall pines and leafy shrubs; at right, a sign reads "Plank Road State Forest, Plank Road Wildlife Management Area". | 2017 | Leon, Jefferson; 30.3374°N 84.1085°W | 9,043.5 acres (3,659.8 ha) (Note: The plan gives 9,043.5 acres. The Florida Forest Service now describes the forest as more than 15,000 acres.) | St. Marks River, Gum Creek, Limestone Creek, Chicken Branch, Hamlin Branch | Wet pine flatwoods, swamps and bottomland forest along the upper St. Marks River and its tributaries, where the floodplain and bottomland forests are in excellent natural condition. Hunting is the main use; hiking, biking and horseback riding are on forest roads and firelines, and the river can be fished and paddled. |
| Point Washington | A brown sign reading "Point Washington State Forest, Public Entrance" stands beside a sandy road leading into scrub and scattered pines. | 1992 | Walton; 30.3374°N 86.1035°W | 15,407.35 acres (6,235.1 ha) | Eastern Lake | Pine flatwoods, sandhill and swamp between Choctawhatchee Bay and the Gulf of Mexico, with a stand of old-growth longleaf pine and Eastern Lake, a coastal dune lake, on its southern edge. Trails include the Eastern Lake loops for hiking and biking, the 8-mile Longleaf Greenway Trail through the old-growth pines, and the McQuage Bayou horse trail. |
| Ralph E. Simmons Memorial | Across a two-lane road, a brown-and-white sign reading "Ralph E. Simmons Memorial State Forest" stands in front of a fenced, sandy clearing with an oak and pine woods behind. | 1992 | Nassau; 30.8034°N 81.9486°W | 3,638 acres (1,472.2 ha) | St. Marys River | Sandhill, upland pine and steep hardwood slopes that drop within a short distance to wet flatwoods and floodplain swamp along 6.7 miles of the St. Marys River, which borders the forest on the north and west. Scott's Landing Road leads to a group campsite and a boat ramp. |
| Ross Prairie | A brown "Welcome to Ross Prairie State Forest, Please protect your forest" sign on a stacked stone base stands at the edge of dense woods. | 1994 | Marion; 29.0192°N 82.2859°W | 3,531.82 acres (1,429.3 ha) | None | Longleaf pine, turkey oak and wiregrass uplands with depression marshes and scrub, sharing almost 2 miles of boundary with the Marjorie Harris Carr Cross Florida Greenway; there are no streams or ponds. The 2.3-mile Holly Hammock Trail leads to a primitive campsite, and riders have 15 miles of trail. |
| Sandy Creek | | 2025 | Bay; 30.1962°N 85.4363°W | 12,243 acres (4,954.6 ha) | | Land in the St. Andrew Bay watershed, bought in 2025 through the Bear Creek Forest Florida Forever project, that links conservation lands between Eglin Air Force Base and the Apalachicola National Forest as part of the Florida Wildlife Corridor. It provides habitat for the gopher tortoise, Florida black bear and reticulated flatwoods salamander. |
| Seminole | Seen through a car windshield, a brown sign reading "Seminole State Forest, Cassia Trailhead" with an arrow stands beside a wooden fence at a rural road junction. | 1990 | Lake; 28.8538°N 81.4379°W | 30,169.25 acres (12,209.1 ha) | Wekiva River, Black Water Creek, Sulphur Run | Scrub, sandhill, pine flatwoods and swamp on karst, with the Wekiva River on the southeast edge and Black Water Creek crossing the forest, both part of the National Wild and Scenic Rivers System; the scrub holds 30 to 50 Florida scrub jay territories. Seventeen miles of the Florida Trail run through the forest, which has more than 32 miles of hiking trail and 26 miles of horse trail. |
| Tate's Hell | A sandy road leads between wooden rail fences into a tunnel of oaks and pines; at right, a sign reads "Tate's Hell State Forest, St. James Island Unit". | 1994 | Franklin, Liberty; 29.8693°N 84.8192°W | 202,436.58 acres (81,923.2 ha) | New River, Ochlockonee River, Crooked River, Lake McKissack | Flatwoods and swamp around Tate's Hell Swamp, which drains to the Apalachicola River and Apalachicola Bay, with stands of dwarf pond cypress more than 250 years old but only about 15 feet tall. A boardwalk overlooks the dwarf cypress, the High Bluff Trail follows ancient dunes along St. George Sound, and more than 850 miles of unpaved roads reach boat launches and campsites. |
| Tiger Bay | Tall, slender slash pines rise from a green understory of ferns beside dark standing water. | 1979 | Volusia; 29.2183°N 81.1929°W | 27,389 acres (11,083.9 ha) | Indian Lake, Scoggin Lake, Sawgrass Lake, Coon Pond, Tiger Bay Canal, Duke's Island Canal | Basin swamp and pine flatwoods around Tiger Bay, a large wetland that is the forest's main physical feature, with globally imperiled scrub on Rima Ridge. Several lakes and ponds are open for fishing and small boats, and trails include the 2-mile Buncombe Hill Interpretive Trail and a mile of the brick Pershing Highway, built in 1917. |
| Twin Rivers | A sandy entrance road forks across a mowed field under high-voltage power lines, between a "Twin Rivers State Forest" sign at left and a "Prescribed Fire" sign at right. | 1994 | Hamilton, Madison, Suwannee; 30.3794°N 83.2010°W | 14,981.42 acres (6,062.8 ha) | Withlacoochee River, Suwannee River | Sandhill, floodplain forest and swamp along the Withlacoochee and Suwannee rivers, which meet at Ellaville; Anderson Spring and Pot Spring, both second-magnitude springs on the riverbanks, are popular summer swimming spots. The Ellaville Trail is part of the Florida Trail, and primitive camping is allowed along the rivers. |
| Wakulla | A brown-and-white sign reading "Wakulla State Forest, Wakulla Wildlife Management Area" stands in front of a wooden fence and dark woods. | 1999 (Note: Includes the Woodville Tract, deeded to the state in 1946, a separate state forest from 1990 and merged into Wakulla State Forest in 2002.) | Wakulla, Leon; 30.2640°N 84.2830°W | 4,897.08 acres (1,981.8 ha) | McBride Slough | Sand ridges, upland pine and mixed forest grading down to McBride Slough, which flows south to the Wakulla River; part of the forest is in the groundwater recharge area of Wakulla Springs, less than half a mile to the south. Trails include the 1.75-mile Nemours hiking loop and the 4.5-mile Double Springs loop for hikers and riders. |
| Watson Island | | 1976 | St. Johns; 29.8924°N 81.5835°W | 505.58 acres (204.6 ha) | St. Johns River, Six Mile Creek | Two tracts of wet pine flatwoods and bottomland forest interlaced with marsh, swamp and live oak hammock; the Watson Island Tract has just over a mile of St. Johns River frontage. Both tracts are open to the public but have no designated trails or facilities, and firelines serve as hiking trails. |
| Welaka | A brown sign reading "Welaka State Forest, Mud Spring Trail" with a left-pointing arrow and picnic, hiking and wildlife viewing symbols stands on a roadside lawn below moss-draped oaks. | 1992 (Note: The federal government deeded the land to the state in 1954; it was assigned to the Florida Department of Agriculture and Consumer Services in 1992.) | Putnam; 29.4553°N 81.6606°W | 2,287.11 acres (925.6 ha) | St. Johns River, Mud Spring run, Sulphur Spring run | A continuum from sandhill through pine flatwoods to floodplain swamp along about 2.5 miles of undeveloped St. Johns River shore, with two small springs; Mud Spring, on a hiking trail, is a popular swimming and picnic spot. Trails serve hikers and riders, and Orange Point has a primitive campsite. |
| Withlacoochee | A small brown "Welcome to Withlacoochee State Forest" sign on a stone base stands on a grassy roadside beside dense, moss-hung woods along a highway. | 1958 (Note: Leased from the federal government under a 1958 lease-purchase agreement; title passed to the state in February 1983.) | Citrus, Hernando, Lake, Pasco, Sumter; 28.4753°N 82.0408°W | 164,073.18 acres (66,398.1 ha) | Withlacoochee River, Little Withlacoochee River, Jumper Creek, Silver Lake, McKethan Lake, Boggy Pond, Mason Creek, Otter Creek | Mostly sandhill and pine flatwoods in several tracts across five counties, with caves and limestone outcrops on the Citrus Tract, about 18 miles of Withlacoochee River shoreline, and coastal hardwood swamp on the Homosassa Tract between the Homosassa and Chassahowitzka rivers. Its recreation areas, used by visitors from Tampa and Orlando since the 1930s, include campgrounds, trailheads and a large off-highway vehicle area. |
