= Jennings State Forest =

State forest in Florida, United States

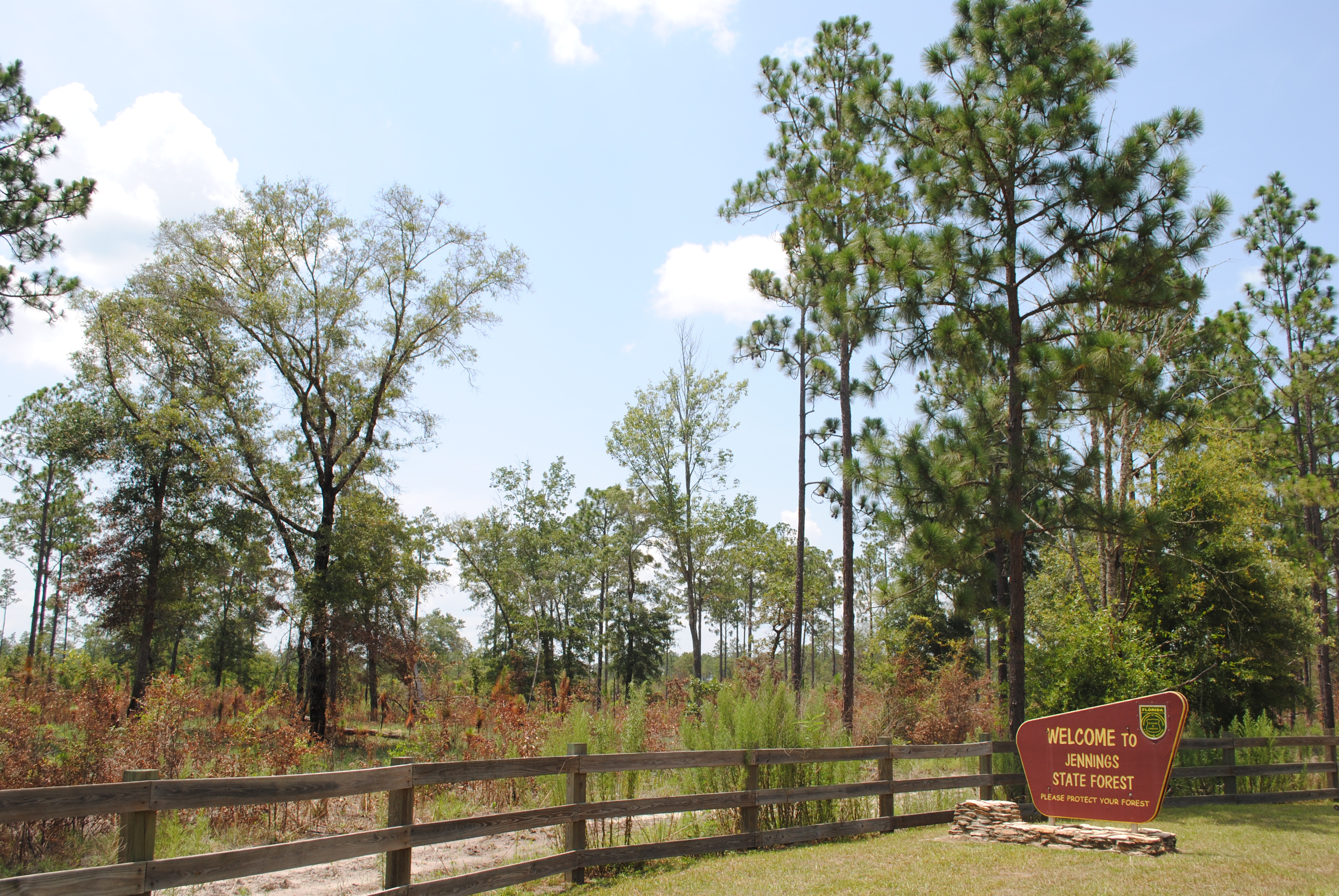
- Jennings State Forest near Middleburg
- Interactive map of Jennings State Forest
- Location: Clay and Duval counties, Florida
- Nearest city: Jacksonville
- Coordinates: 30°03′03.0″N 81°54′07.0″W
- Area: 25,301 acres (10,239 ha)
- Website: Jennings State Forest

The Jennings State Forest is in the U.S. state of Florida. The 25,301-acre (102 km^{2}) forest is located in northeastern Florida, near Jacksonville. The forest is the home of rare plants such as the Bartram's Ixia and St. John's Susan.

Jennings State Forest is surrounded by various recreational areas and wildlife management areas including the Nolan Road, Knights Landing, and Indian Ford Recreational Areas.

The forest includes sandhills, flatwoods, seepage slopes, and dome swamps. The Florida Forest Service uses prescribed fire to maintain habitats that depend on periodic burning.

== See also ==
- List of Florida state forests
- List of Florida state parks
