= Plank Road State Forest =

State forest in Florida, United States

- The main road from the west entrance

- Location within Florida Location within the United States
- Interactive map of Plank Road State Forest
- Location: Leon and Jefferson counties, Florida, United States
- Nearest city: Tallahassee
- Coordinates: 30°20′15″N 84°06′31″W
- Area: 15,837 acres (6,409 ha)
- Established: 2017; 9 years ago
- Governing body: Florida Forest Service
- Website: fdacs.gov

Plank Road State Forest is a Florida state forest of 15,837 acres (6,409 ha) along the upper St. Marks River in eastern Leon County and western Jefferson County, east of Tallahassee. The Florida Forest Service manages it as a multiple-use forest for timber, recreation, and wildlife under a lease from the Board of Trustees of the Internal Improvement Trust Fund, which holds title to the land. About 8,000 acres (3,200 ha) of the forest make up the Plank Road Wildlife Management Area, where the Florida Fish and Wildlife Conservation Commission regulates hunting.

The forest is named for a wooden plank road begun in the mid-1800s to carry cotton and other goods from Newport, the head of practical navigation on the St. Marks, to the Georgia line. The road was never finished and reached only as far as present-day U.S. Highway 27. The St. Joe Paper Company owned the land for several decades and grew pine on short rotations, then sold it in 2014 to Deseret Cattle and Timber.

In October 2016 Governor Rick Scott and the Florida Cabinet agreed to spend $16 million on about 11,000 acres (4,500 ha), which the Associated Press called the state's largest conservation land purchase in a decade. The sale closed on May 23, 2017. About 1,985 acres (803 ha) were added to Natural Bridge Battlefield Historic State Park, and the remaining 9,043.5 acres (3,659.8 ha) became the state forest, which the Florida Forest Service began managing in November 2017. In 2019 the Florida Department of Environmental Protection and The Nature Conservancy added 611 acres (247 ha) that link the forest toward the Aucilla Wildlife Management Area, and in 2023 the state bought 5,457 acres (2,208 ha) between the forest and Natural Bridge Road as a further addition.

Gum Creek, Limestone Creek, Chicken Branch, and Hamlin Branch flow through the forest into the St. Marks River.
