= Charles H. Bronson State Forest =

State forest in Florida, United States

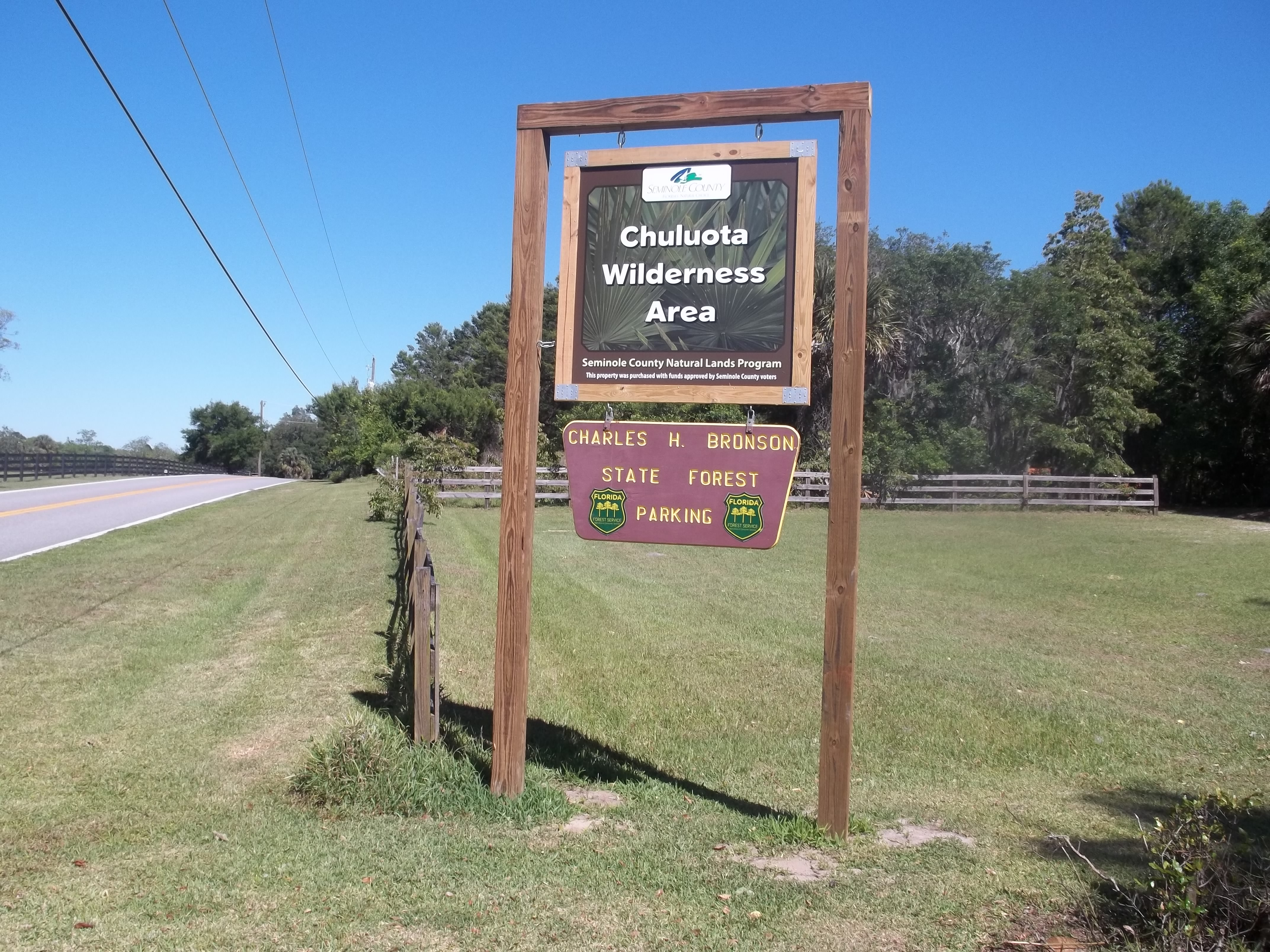
- Sign for the Chuluota Wilderness Area within the Charles H. Bronson State Forest

- Location within Florida
- Location: Orange County and Seminole County, Florida
- Nearest city: Christmas, Florida
- Coordinates: 28°37′26″N 81°01′23″W
- Area: 10,945 acres (4,429 ha)
- Other information: Hiking, wildlife viewing, horseback riding

Charles H. Bronson State Forest is located north of Christmas, Florida. It covers almost 11,000 acres in southeastern Seminole and northeastern Orange County and is located just south of Little Big Econ State Forest. The St. Johns River forms part of the eastern boundary of the forest.

== Geography ==
The Forest is located just east of the Chuluota Wilderness Area, a 625-acre natural area owned by Seminole County.

The Charles H. Bronson State Forest is adjacent to and south of the Little Big Econ State Forest. The forest is approximately 11,246 acres. The most notable feature in the Charles H. Bronson State Forest is the St. Johns River. Four creeks flow through the forest: Turkey Creek, Joshua Creek, Buscombe Creek, and Christmas Creek. The forest offers recreation services and features 20 miles of horse trails connected to 3 other conservation lands.

The forest protects wetlands in the St. Johns River floodplain and includes wet prairie, pine flatwoods, sandhill, and cypress swamp habitats.

== History ==
Florida's legislative direction established the Charles H. Bronson State Forest on July 1, 2008. The forest is named for Charles H. Bronson, Commissioner for the Florida Department of Agriculture and Consumer Services from 2001 to 2011.

In the past the forest was used for turpentine, agriculture and cattle grazing. Today it is managed to restore and maintain native ecosystems, protect plants and animals, protect archaeological and historical sites, support outdoor recreation, and protect the quality and health of rivers and wetlands.

== See also ==
- List of Florida state forests
- List of Florida state parks
