= Cary State Forest =

State forest in Florida, United States

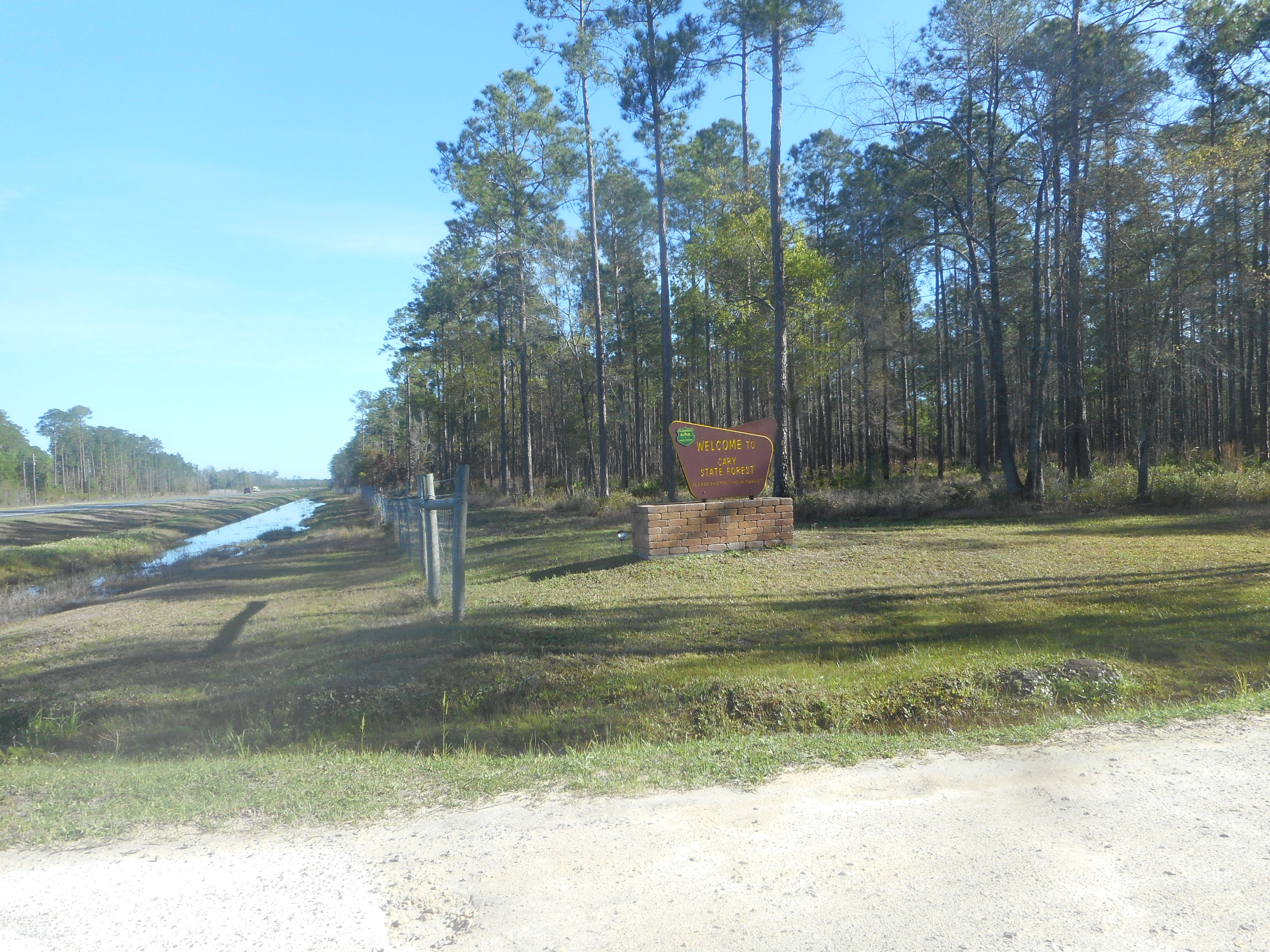
- Sign at the road to the Cary Campground off of US 301.

- Location within Florida
- Location: Duval and Nassau counties, Florida
- Nearest city: Bryceville
- Coordinates: 30.411596°N 81.915107°W
- Area: 13,385 acres (5,417 ha)
- Administrator: Florida Department of Agriculture and Consumer Services
- Other information: Hiking, biking, horseback riding, hunting, fishing

The Cary State Forest is in the U.S. state of Florida. The 13,385-acre (5,417 ha) forest is located in the northeast in Bryceville, Florida, a community between Baldwin and Callahan northwest of Jacksonville. It was established as the second State Forest of Florida, in 1937.

The main tract of the forest (Cary Tract) is located along the east side of US 301 between Bryceville and Ingle, Behind this tract is the Monticello Tract, which is almost entirely in Duval County, and southeast of this is the Norfolk Southern Tract, the southern portion of which is bisected by the Jacksonville-Baldwin Rail Trail. Much further north of these is the Thomas Creek Tract south of Crawford, most of which is in Nassau County, except for one-fourth of the eastern section.

== Ecology ==
Slash pine flatwoods dominate the forest, which also contains sandhills, basin swamps, and cypress domes. Prescribed burning is used to maintain native plant and animal communities and reduce wildfire risk.

== See also ==
- List of Florida state forests
- List of Florida state parks
- Jacksonville-Baldwin Rail Trail
