= Big Shoals State Park =

State park in Florida, United States

- IUCN category III (natural monument or feature)
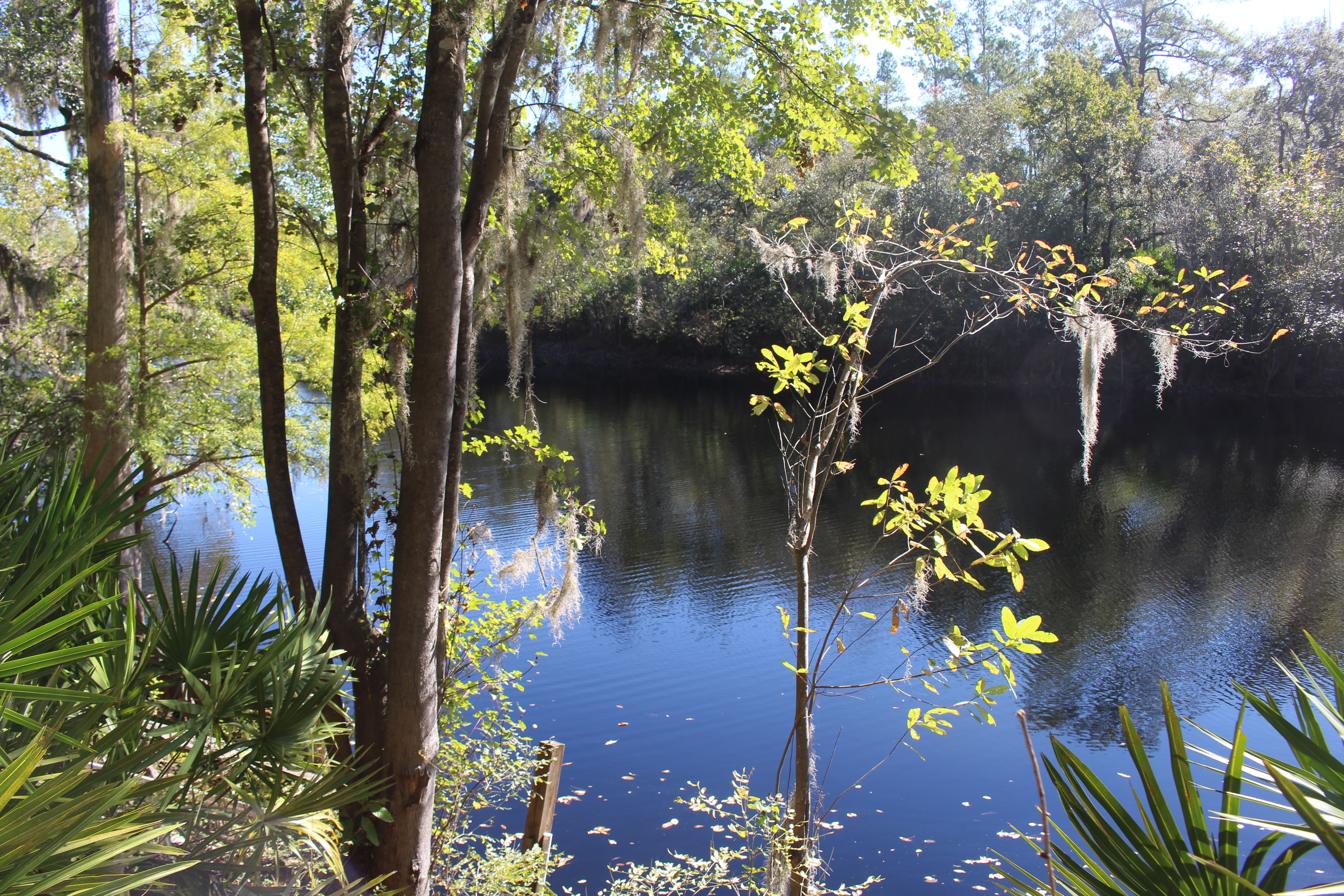
- Scenery along the Suwannee River

- Location within Florida Location within the United States
- Interactive map of Big Shoals State Park
- Location: Hamilton County, Florida, USA
- Nearest city: White Springs, Florida
- Coordinates: 30°20′21″N 82°40′59″W
- Governing body: Florida Department of Environmental Protection

Big Shoals State Park in Hamilton County, Florida, is a Florida State Park. It is approximately one mile (1.6 km) east of White Springs, off US 41. The park is situated on the Suwannee River and features limestone bluffs as well as the biggest whitewater rapids in all of Florida. The park also features more than 28 miles (45 km) of hiking and nature trails, and freshwater fishing.

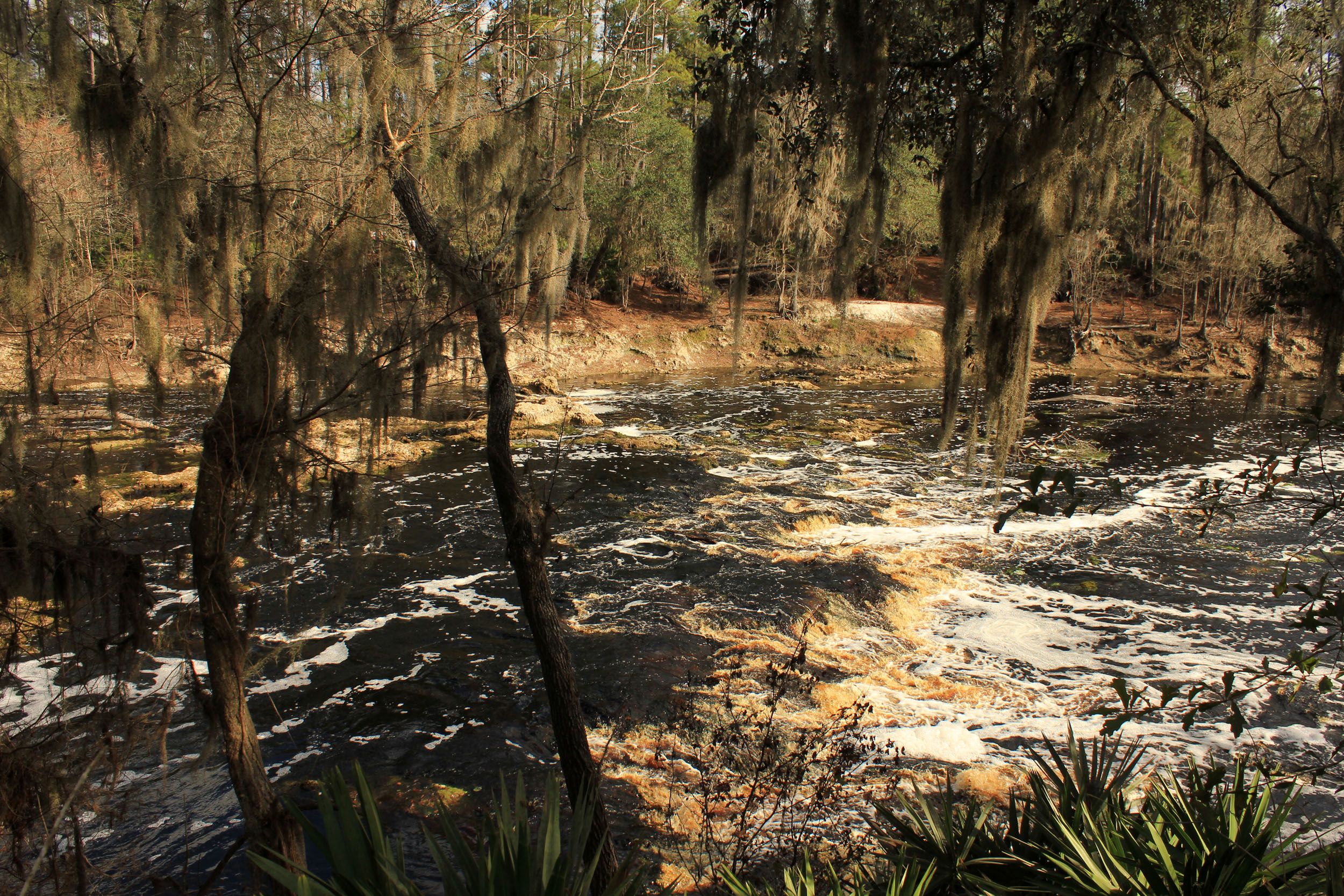
Whitewater rapids at Big Shoals

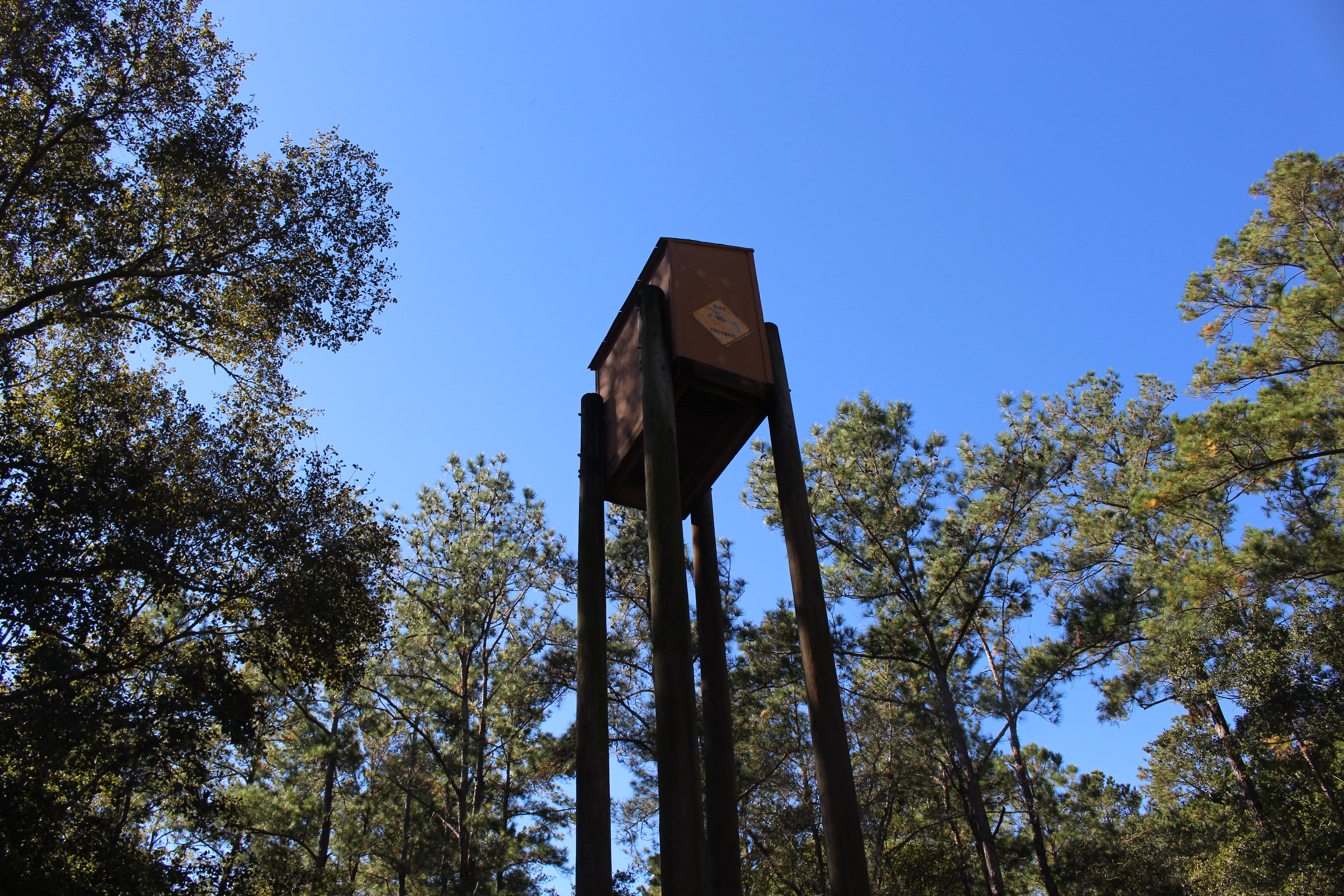
Top of bat exhibit

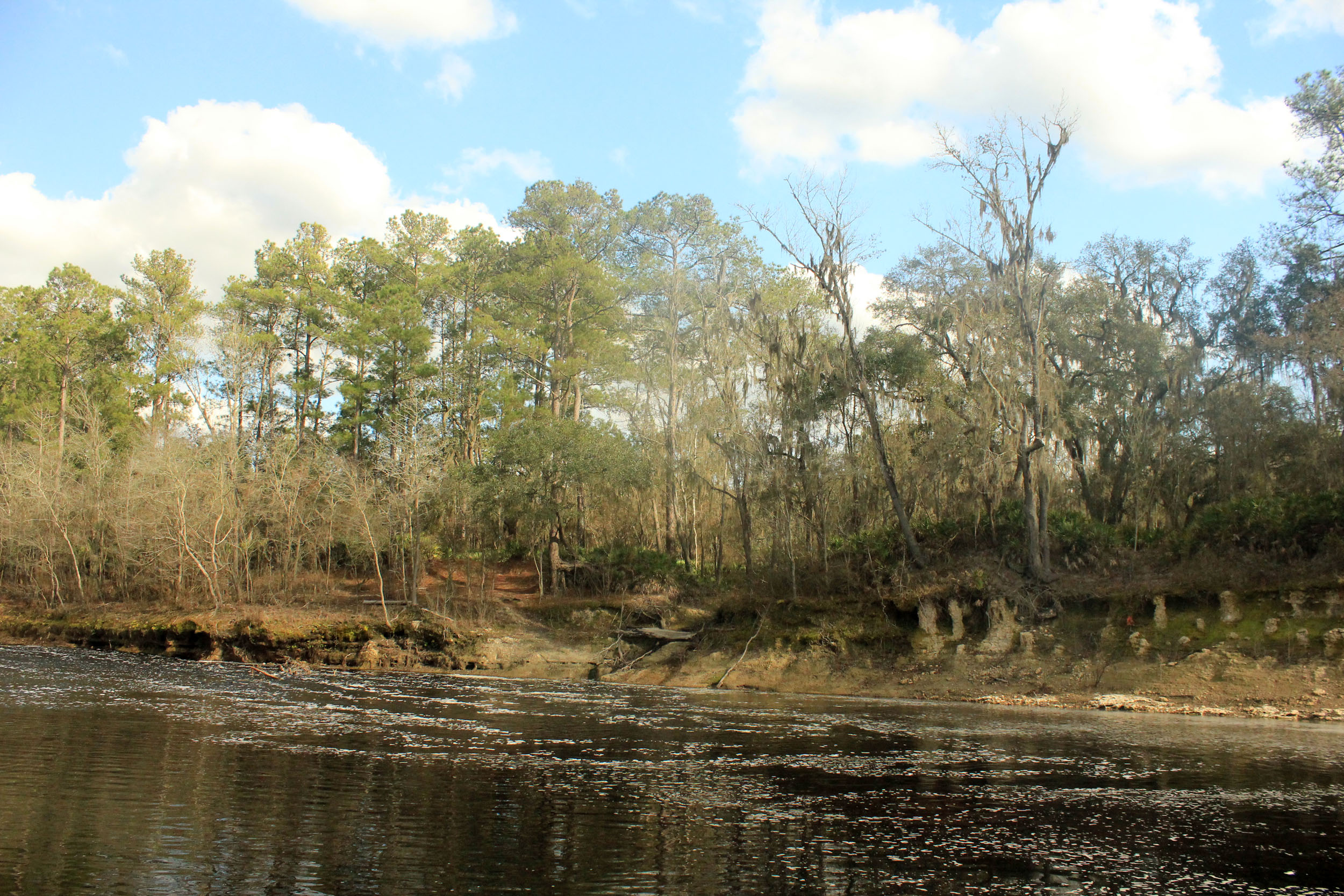
Suwannee River

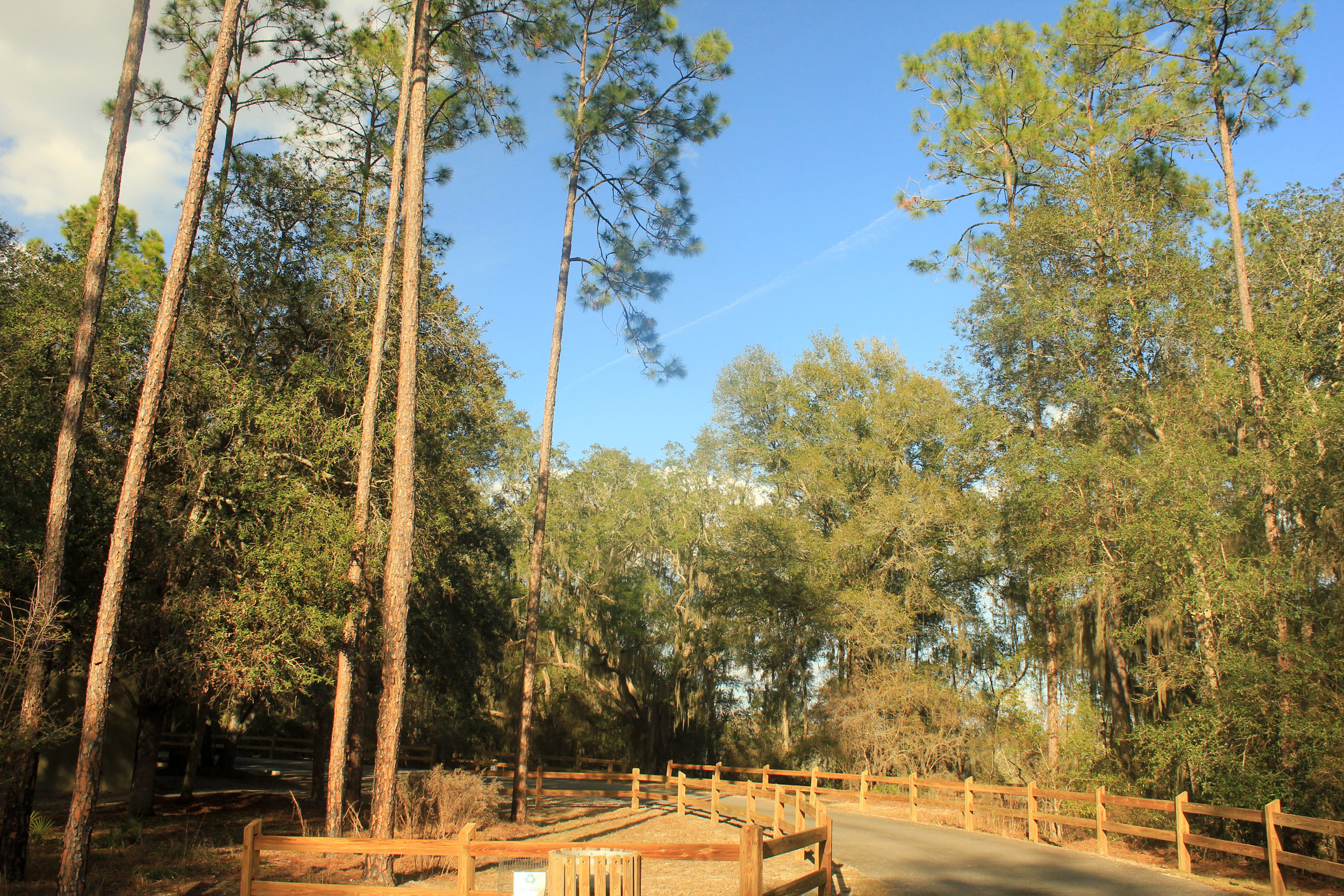
Camping area

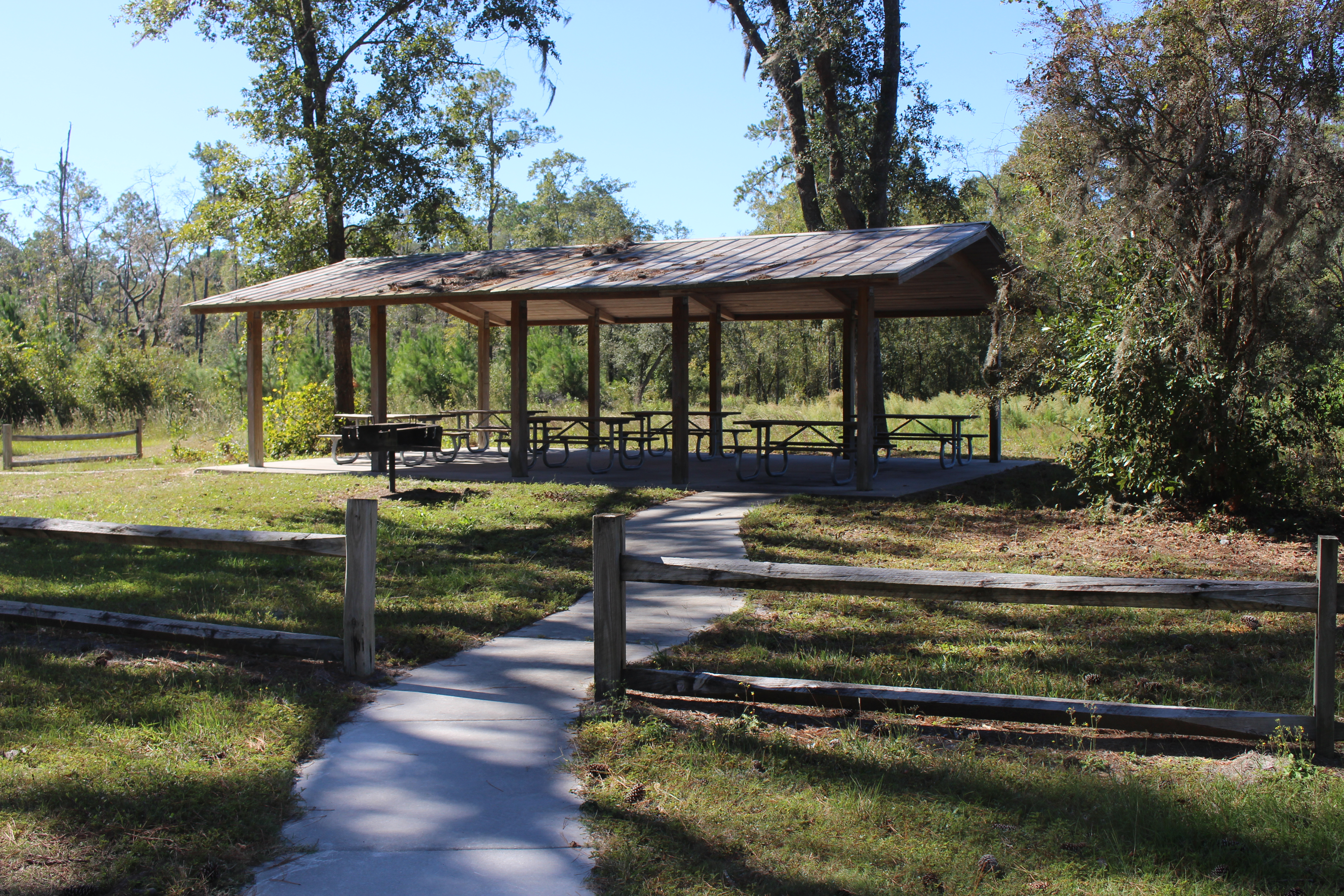
Little Shoals Picnic shelter

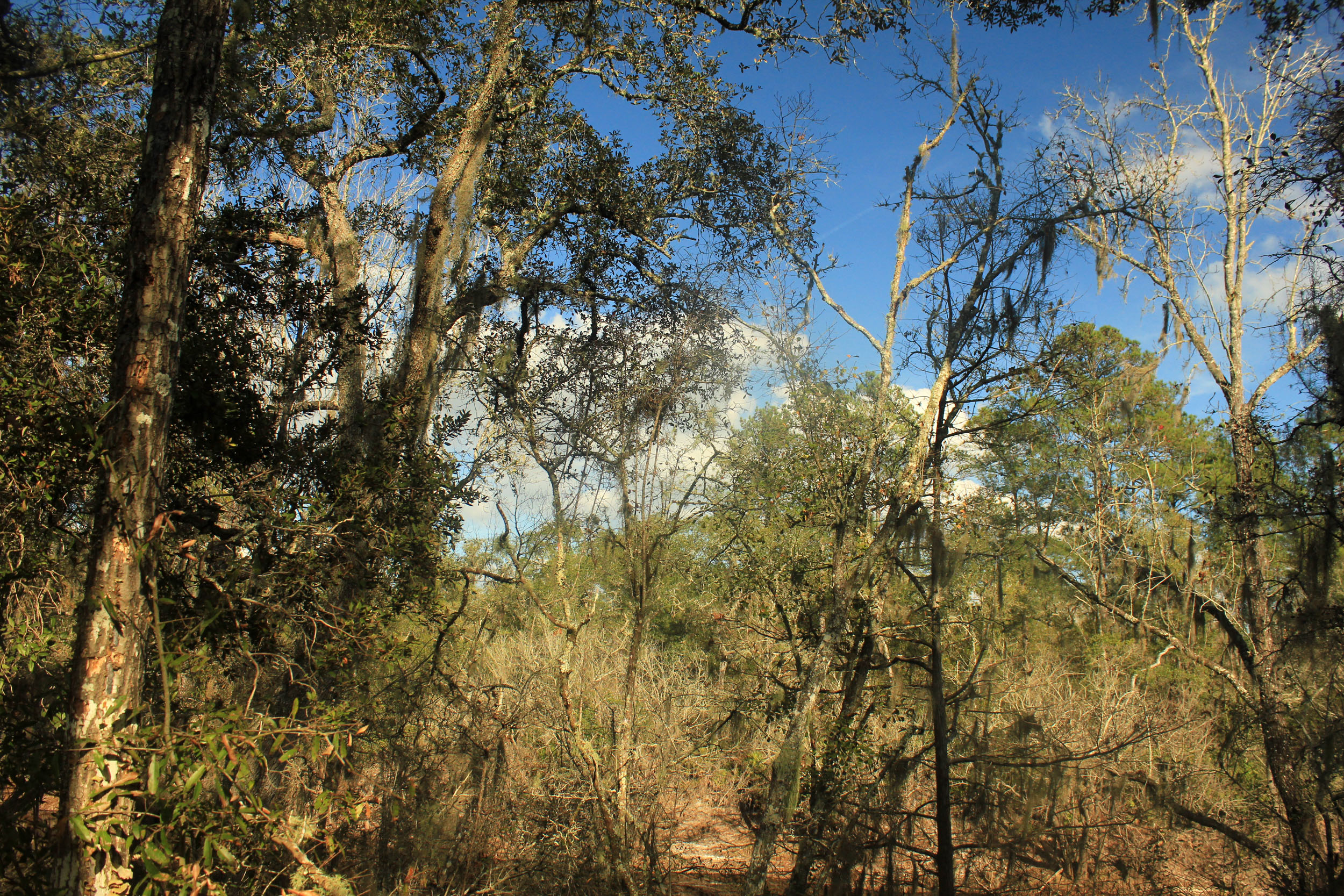
Tree line

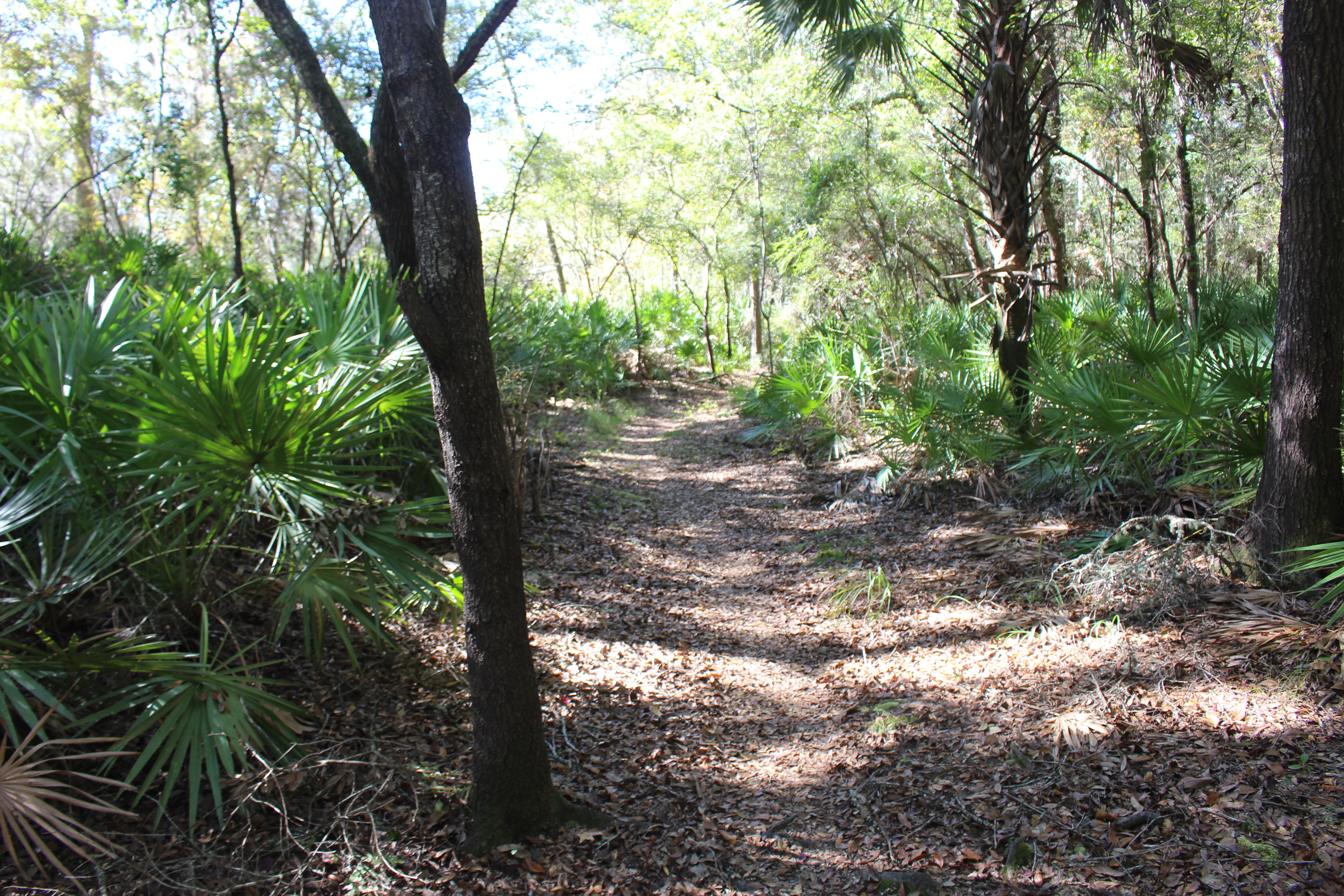
Long Branch trail

== See also ==
- List of Florida state parks
- List of Florida state forests
