= Pine Log State Forest =

State forest in Florida, United States

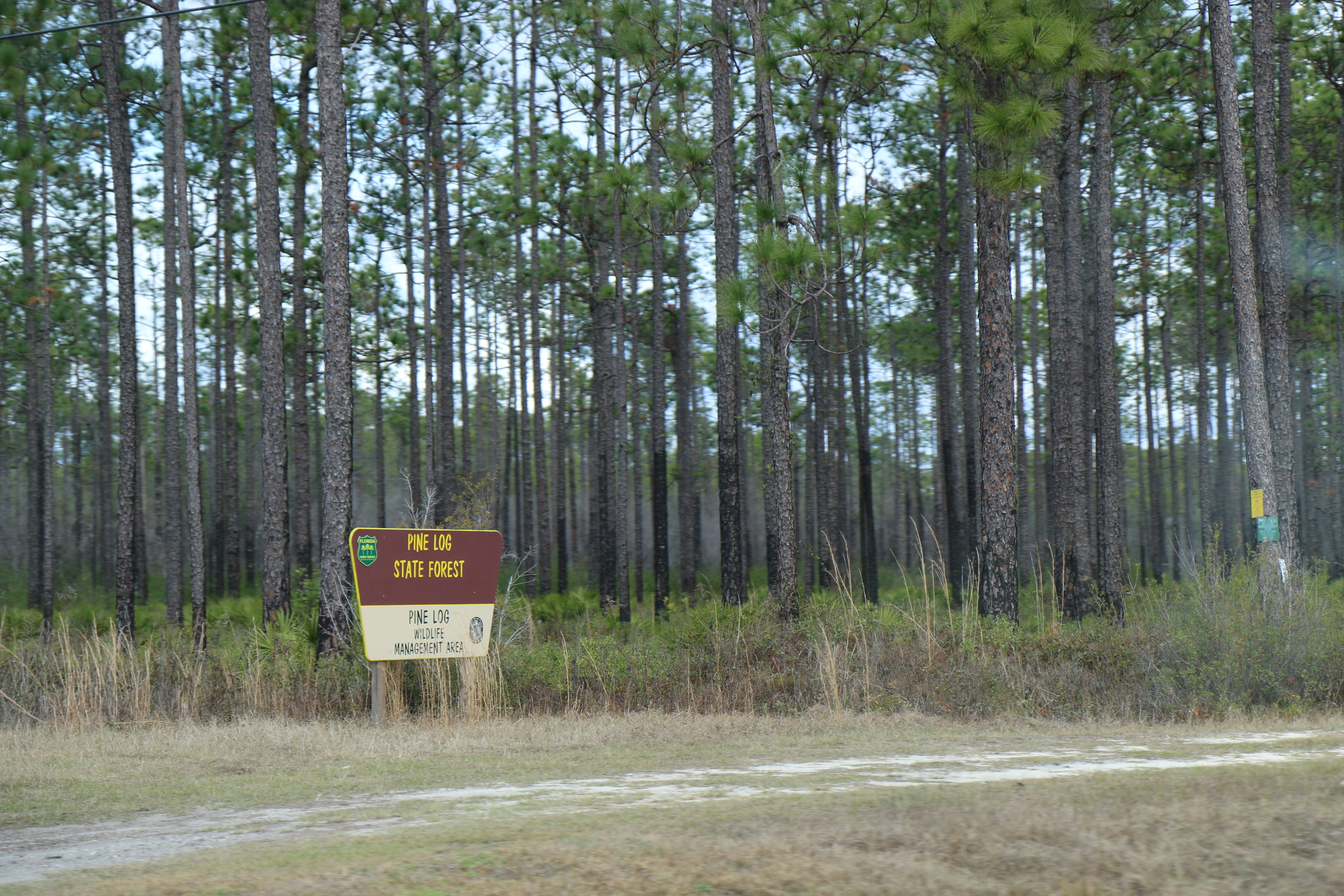
- Sign on SR 79
- Interactive map of Pine Log State Forest
- Location: Bay and Washington counties, Florida
- Nearest city: Ebro
- Area: 8,037 acres (3,252 ha)
- Governing body: Florida Forest Service

The Pine Log State Forest is in the U.S. state of Florida. The 8,037-acre (33 km^{2}) forest is located in the panhandle, near Ebro. It was established in 1936 and is Florida's oldest state forest.

Facilities and activities available include camping, swimming, fishing, boat ramp, picnicking, bicycling, horseback riding, hiking and nature trails
