= Florida Forest Service =

Forestry agency of the Florida state government

- Logo of the Florida Forest Service

Agency overview
- Formed: 1928; 98 years ago
- Preceding agency: Florida Board of Forestry
- Jurisdiction: Florida
- Headquarters: 3125 Conner Boulevard, Tallahassee
- Employees: 1,142 authorized positions (FY 2026-27)
- Annual budget: US$719.2 million (FY 2026-27) (Note: The FY 2026-27 appropriation includes $425 million for conservation and rural land protection easements under the Rural and Family Lands Protection Program, and $64.1 million for emergency wildfire management. The FY 2025-26 appropriation was $438.2 million.)
- Agency executive: Rick Dolan, Director
- Parent agency: Florida Department of Agriculture and Consumer Services
- Website: www.fdacs.gov/Divisions-Offices/Florida-Forest-Service

The Florida Forest Service (FFS) is the Florida state government agency that manages the state forest system, forestry assistance to landowners, and wildland fire protection. It is a division of the Florida Department of Agriculture and Consumer Services (FDACS), and administers more than 1.2 million acres of state forests, provides forest management assistance on more than 17 million acres of private and community forests, and protects homes, forestland and natural resources from wildfire on more than 26 million acres.

== History ==
Under an act of the Florida Legislature approved on June 6, 1927, the Florida Board of Forestry appointed Harry Lee Baker as the first state forester on February 23, 1928, and he took office that April 1. The board organized the new staff into three branches, for applied forestry, fire control and public relations, and decided that the work of the board, the state forester and his field staff would be known to the public as the "Florida Forest Service". In 1935 the legislature authorized the Board of Forestry to manage state forests and parks that the federal government had acquired and turned over to the state. Forests and the early state parks, now run by the Florida Park Service, were administered together in this period: the Fifth Biennial Report of the Florida Forest and Park Service, covering 1936 to 1938, set out the policy of assigning wild land to forest or park management according to its highest use. The first state forest, Pine Log State Forest in Bay and Washington counties, was established in 1936.

During World War II, with many men in the armed forces or war industries, the service began hiring women as fire tower lookouts in 1943; by 1947, 22 of Florida's 104 tower operators were women. In 1948 the service bought a Cessna 120 airplane, nicknamed the "Fire Bug", to patrol for wildfires and map them. In the winter of 1953 it began "Operation Message Drop", in which its airplanes dropped envelopes with crepe paper streamers carrying fire-weather warnings to people in areas where careless woods burning had been a problem, and a person tending a fire who needed help could wave the message to have the pilot radio for a fire crew. By 1954 about a third of the 34 counties under organized fire protection were using the method.

The Governmental Reorganization Act of 1969 transferred the programs and responsibilities of the Board of Forestry to FDACS, where they were assigned to the Florida Forest Service. The board was renamed the Forestry Advisory Council, and its role changed from setting policy to advising the director and the Commissioner of Agriculture. Between 1987 and 2009, purchases funded through the Conservation and Recreation Lands (CARL) Trust Fund and the Preservation 2000 (P2000) program brought the number of state forests to 35, with state forest land in more than half of Florida's 67 counties. The system's millionth acre, part of an addition to Cary State Forest, was bought in 2006.

== Responsibilities ==
The Florida Forest Service's authority comes from chapters 589, 590 and 591 of the Florida Statutes, among others. Besides managing the state forests, it fights and works to prevent wildfires, issues authorizations for prescribed and open burning, and administers the Florida Forest Legacy Program, the Florida Urban and Community Forestry program and the Rural and Family Lands Protection Program. It also offers technical advice and grants to forest landowners, sells tree seedlings, and runs Operation Outdoor Freedom, which provides recreation on state forest land for wounded veterans.

== Directors ==
Directors of the Florida Forest Service
Director	Term
Harry Lee Baker	1928 to 1940
Henry J. Malsberger	1940 to 1945
Clinton Huxley Coulter	1945 to 1969
John M. Bethea	1970 to 1987
Harold K. Mikell	1987 to 1992
L. Earl Peterson	1992 to 2003
Michael C. Long	2003 to 2008
James R. Karels	2008 to 2020
Erin W. Albury	2020 to 2023
Rick Dolan	2023 to present
