= List of sites in the South section of the Great Florida Birding Trail =

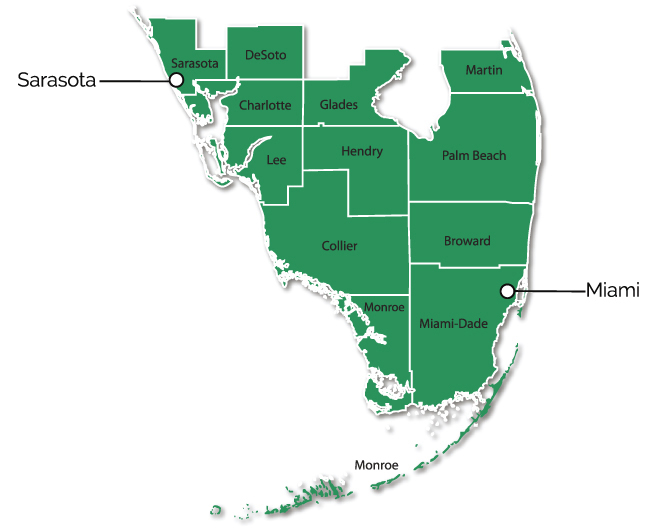
Counties included in the South Section of the Great Florida Birding Trail

This is a list of parks and nature reserves that are locations in the South section of the Great Florida Birding Trail.

Locations include sites in Broward, Charlotte, Collier, DeSoto, Glades, Hendry, Lee, Martin, Monroe, Miami-Dade, Palm Beach and Sarasota counties.

== Myakka River Cluster ==
- Quick Point Nature Preserve
- Arlington Park
- Pinecraft Park
- Celery Fields
- Crowley Museum and Nature Center
- Myakka River State Park
- Red Bug Slough Preserve
- Siesta Beach
- Oscar Scherer State Park
- T. Mabry Carlton Reserve
- Jelks Preserve

== Sandpiper Cluster ==
- Venice Area Audubon Rookery
- Shamrock Park and Nature Center
- Casperson Beach
- Lemon Bay Park
- Blind Pass Beach Park
- Indian Mound Park, Florida
- Cedar Point Environmental Park
- Amberjack Environmental Park
- Tippecanoe Environmental Park

== Charlotte Harbor Cluster ==
- Charlotte Harbor Preserve State Park: Old Datsun Trail
- Fred C. Babcock/Cecil M. Webb Wildlife Management Area
- Charlotte Flatwoods Environmental Park
- Charlotte Harbor Preserve State Park: North Cape Flats Trail

== Piping Plover Cluster ==
- Charlotte Harbor Preserve State Park: Little Pine Island
- Cayo Costa State Park
- J.N. 'Ding' Darling National Wildlife Refuge
- Lighthouse Park
- Rotary Park
- Lakes Regional Park
- San Carlos Bay: Bunche Beach Preserve
- Bowditch Point Regional Preserve
- Matanzas Pass Preserve
- Little Estero Island Critical Wildlife Area

== Wood Stork Cluster ==
- Lovers Key State Park
- Estero Bay Preserve State Park
- Six Mile Cypress Slough Preserve
- Hickey's Creek Mitigation Park
- Caloosahatchee Regional Park
- CREW Marsh Hiking Trails
- Corkscrew Swamp Sanctuary

== Short-tailed Hawk Cluster ==
- Fisheating Creek Wildlife Management Area- East
- Fisheating Creek Wildlife Management Area- West
- Okaloacooches Slough State Forest and Wildlife Management Area
- Dinner Island Ranch Wildlife Management Area
- Storm Water Treatment Area Five

== Okeechobee Cluster ==
- Storm Water Treatment Area One - West
- Royal Palm Beach Pines Natural Area
- City of West Palm Beach Grassy Waters Preserve
- Sweetbay Natural Area
- J.W. Corbett Wildlife Management Area
- John C. and Mariana Jones/Hungryland Wildlife and Environmental Area
- DuPuis Wildlife and Environmental Area
- Lake Okeechobee Ridge: Rafael E. Sanches Trail
- Hawk's Hammock
- Halpatiokee Regional Park
- Kiplinger Parcel

== Spoonbill and Scrub-Jay Cluster ==
- Rocky Point Hammock
- St. Lucie Inlet Preserve State Park
- Peck Lake Park
- Hobe Sound National Wildlife Refuge
- Jonathan Dickinson State Park
- Jupiter Ridge Natural Area
- Frenchman's Forest Natural Area
- Juno Dunes Natural Area
- John D. MacArthur Beach State Park

== Mangrove Cluster ==
- Delnore-Wiggins Pass State Park
- Conservancy Nature Center
- Eagle Lake Park
- Picayune Strand State Forest: Sabal Palm Hiking Trail
- Rookery Bay National Estuarine Research Reserve
- Tigertail Beach
- Collier-Seminole State Park

== Cypress Cluster ==
- Fakahatchee Strand Preserve State Park
- Everglades National Park: Gulf Coast Visitor Center
- Big Cypress National Preserve

== Snail Kite Cluster ==
- Everglades National Park: Shark Valley Visitor Center
- Holey Land/ Rotenburger Wildlife Management Areas
- Everglades and Francis S. Taylor Wildlife Management Area

== Whistling-Duck and Wetland Cluster ==
- Arthur R. Marshall Loxahatchee National Wildlife Refuge
- Green Cay Wetlands
- Wakodahatchee Wetlands
- Seacrest Scrub Natural Area
- Delray Oaks Natural Area
- Spanish River Park
- Gumbo Limbo Nature Center

== Night-Heron and Burrowing Owl Cluster ==
- Fern Forest Nature Center
- Easterlin Park
- Hugh Taylor Birch State Park
- John U. Lloyd Beach State Park
- West Lake Park and Ann Kolb Nature Center
- Tree Tops Park and Pine Island Ridge Natural Area
- Brian Piccolo Park
- Snake Warrior's Island Natural Area
- Greynolds Park

== Cuckoo Cluster ==
- A. D. Barnes Park
- Crandon Park: Bear Cut Preserve
- Bill Baggs Cape Florida State Park
- Matheson Hammock Park
- The Deering Estate at Cutler

== Pine Rockland Cluster ==
- Castellow Hammock Preserve
- Biscayne National Park: Convoy Point
- Everglades National Park: Main Entrance
- Southern Glades Wildlife and Environmental Area
- Frog Pond Wildlife Management Area "Lucky Hammock"
- Dagny Johnson Key Largo Hammock Botanical State Park
- John Pennekamp Coral Reef State Park

== White-crowned Pigeon Cluster ==
- Long Key State Park
- Curry Hammock State Park
- Crane Point Museums and Nature Center
- Bahia Honda State Park
- National Key Deer Refuge: Blue Hole and Jack Watson Trails

== Key West and Tortugas Cluster ==
- Key West Tropical Forest & Botanical Garden
- Fort Zachary Taylor Historic State Park
- Dry Tortugas National Park
