= Florida tourism industry =

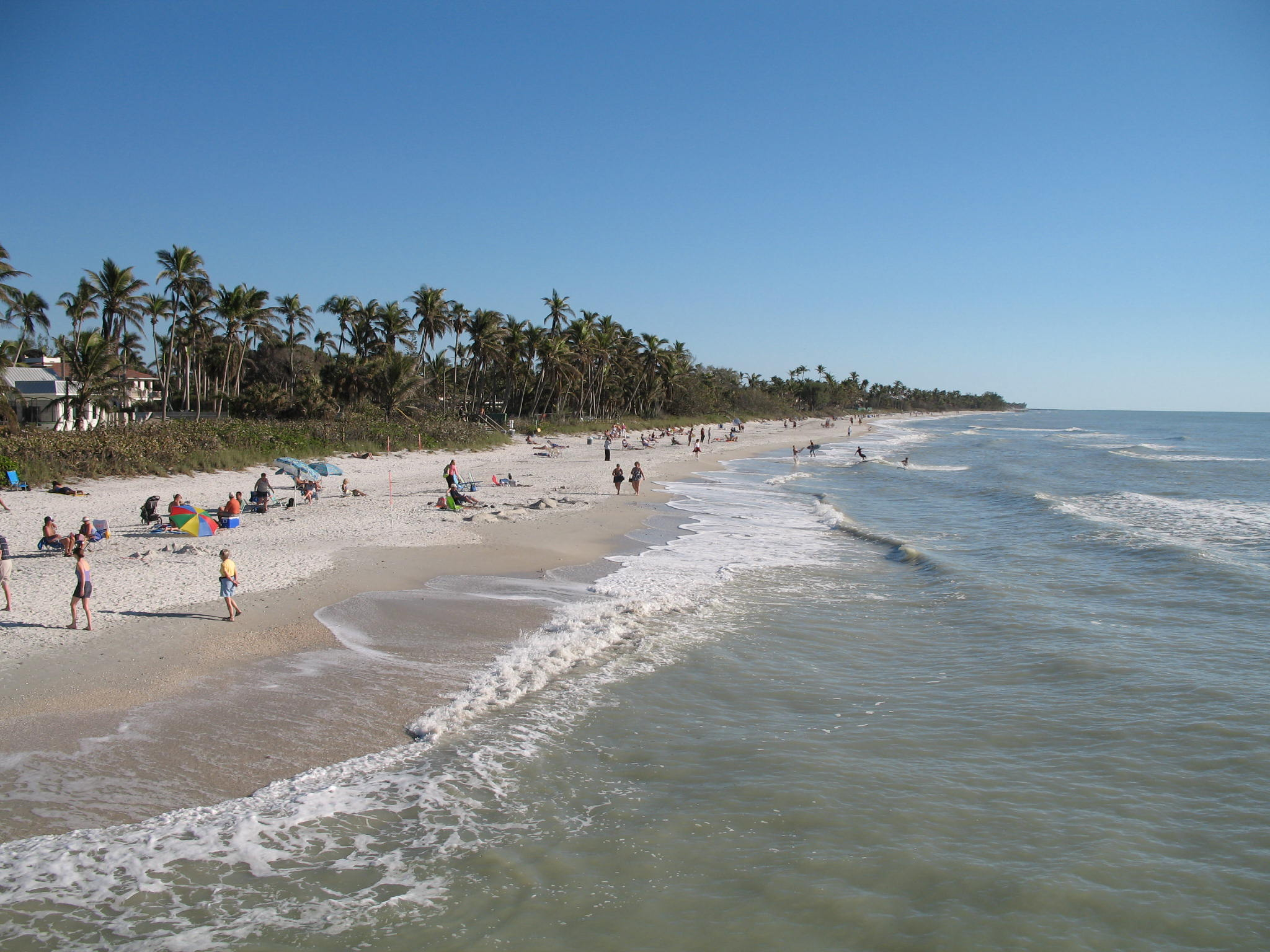
Visitors at the beach in Naples, Florida

Tourism and its related industries make up one of the largest sectors of the economy of the American state of Florida and is also important to the state's culture, politics, and environment.

Florida's tourism industry took off at the end of the 19th century and beginning of the 20th with large infrastructure projects like the Florida East Coast Railway and Dixie Highway and advances in technology like air conditioning allowing tourists to easily visit Florida. Major amusement parks were constructed starting in the 1930s with Walt Disney World becoming the most visited amusement park in the world by the end of the 20th century. Florida's state parks, outdoor recreational opportunities, cruise ship ports, and space launch sites also contribute to the industry.

== History ==
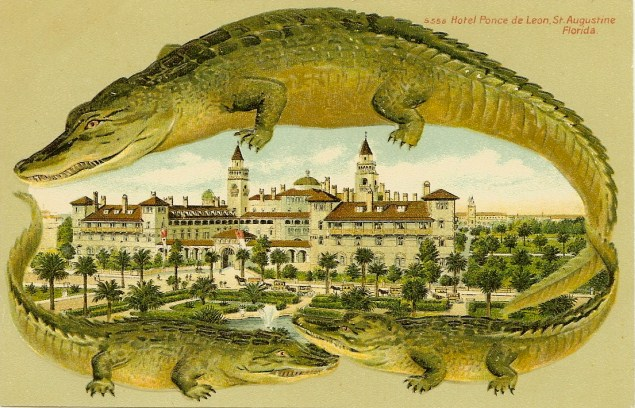
A postcard from the Ponce de Leon Hotel in St. Augustine, Florida circa 1909

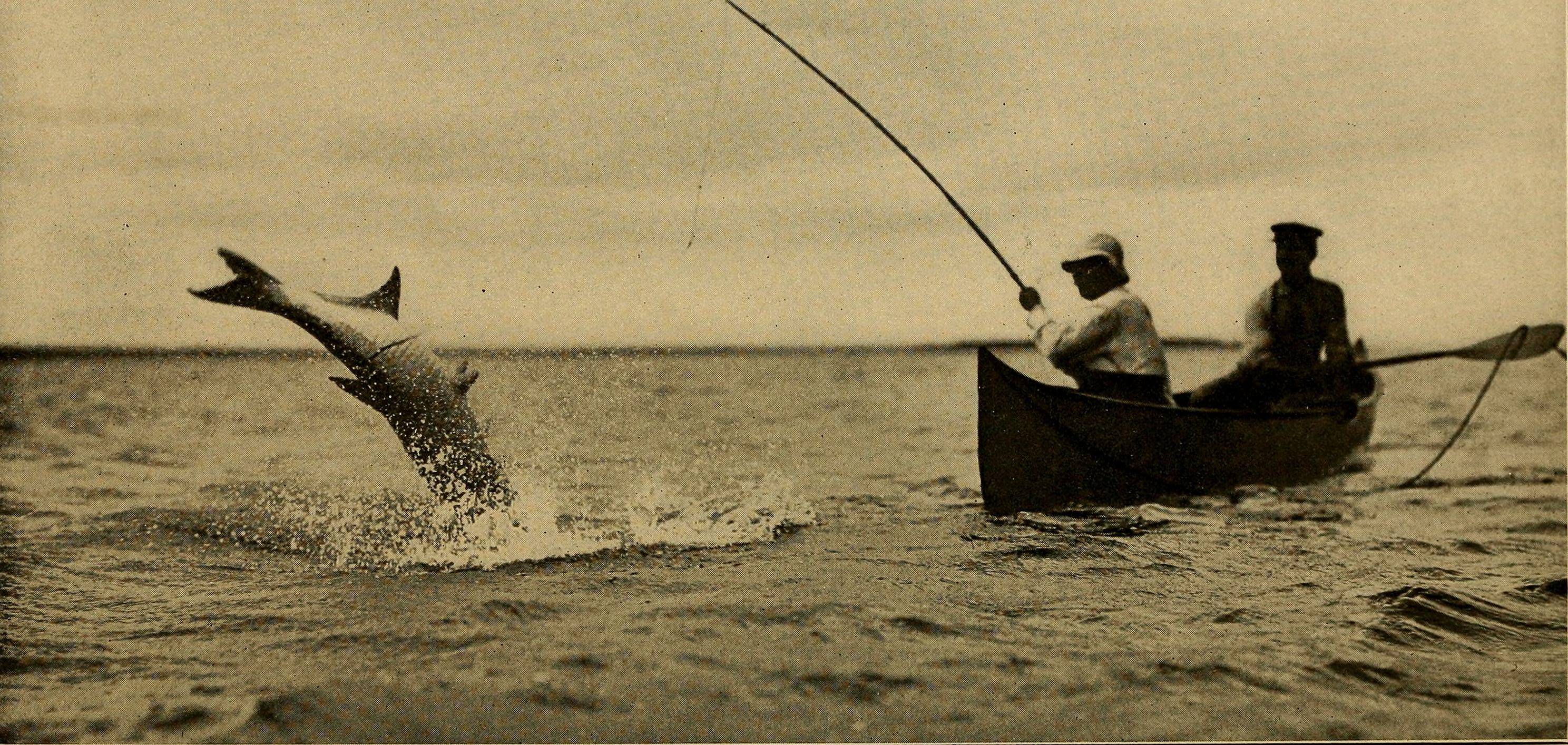
Atlantic tarpon fishing with a fishing guide from a canoe in 1885

Early tourism to Florida in the period following the American Civil War was primarily carried out by outdoorsmen and adventurers intent on hunting, fishing, and birdwatching among other outdoor pursuits.

In 1885 industrialist Henry Flagler began building a grand hotel in St. Augustine, Florida, the Ponce de Leon Hotel. The Ponce de Leon Hotel opened on January 10, 1888. By April of that year, Flagler acquired a second hotel in St. Augustine, the Casa Monica Hotel, which he renamed Cordova. He then built a third hotel, the Hotel Alcazar, which opened in 1898. Stories about the quality of hunting and fishing to be had in Florida published in newspapers and magazines attracted tourists from the late 1800s onwards.

The tourism industry in Florida began in earnest after the completion of Flagler's Florida East Coast Railway allowed tourist from wealthy northern cities to easily reach vacation destinations in Florida. Continuing to develop hotel facilities to entice northern tourists to visit Florida, Flagler bought and expanded the Ormond Hotel in Ormond Beach. The Dixie Highway opened up Florida to automobile-based tourism. This early tourist boom occurred in the context of racial segregation with major attractions being white only.

Florida's first amusement park, Cypress Gardens, opened in 1936. Smaller enterprises operated as tourist traps, often sustaining whole small towns. The states tourism industry boomed following the end of World War II. For much of this time Miami competed with Havana, Cuba as the premier winter destination for wealthy North Americans.

Many beach towns are popular tourist destinations, particularly during winter and spring break. The spring break tradition brings significant numbers of young, primarily college aged, tourists to Florida but also created issues for older tourists and locals. Many beach towns and cities have become less welcoming of spring breakers.

Twenty-three million tourists visited Florida beaches in 2000, spending $22 billion. The public has a right to beach access under the public trust doctrine, but some areas have access effectively blocked by private owners for a long distance.

In 2015, Florida broke the 100-million visitor mark for the first time in state history by hosting a record 105 million visitors. The state has set tourism records for eight consecutive years, most recently breaking the 120-million visitor mark for the first time in 2018 with 126.1 million visitors reported.

Nearly 1.4 million people were employed in the tourism industry in 2016 (a record for the state, surpassing the 1.2 million employment from 2015).

Data released shows 30.9 million visitors coming to the state from October to December 2021, up nearly 60% from the same period in 2020 and topping pre-pandemic levels from the same quarter before the COVID-19 pandemic.

== Amusement parks ==
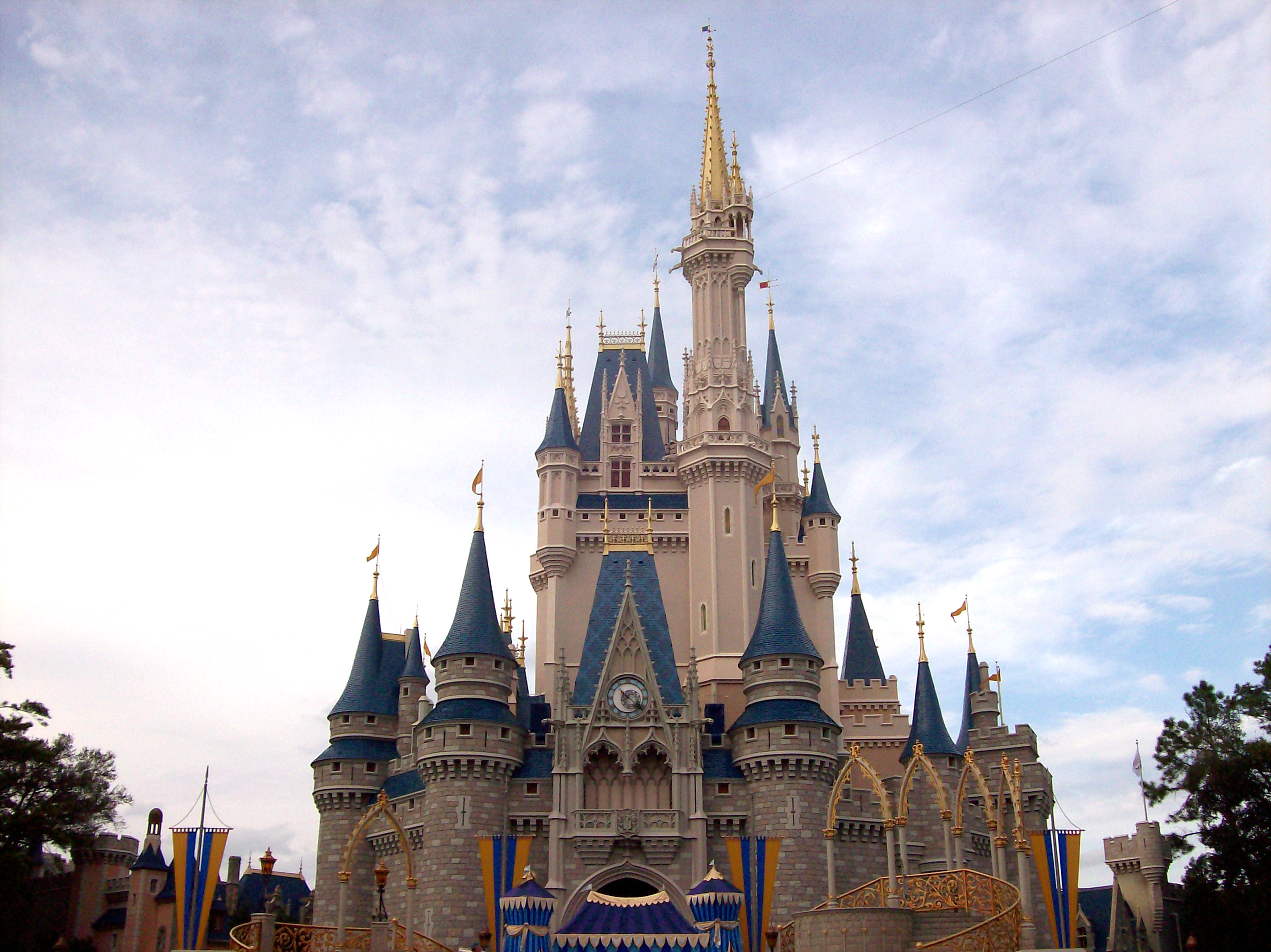
Walt Disney World Resort in Bay Lake, Florida near Orlando

Amusement parks, especially in the Greater Orlando area, make up a significant portion of tourism. Walt Disney World is the most visited vacation resort in the world with more than 58 million visitors annually, consisting of four theme parks, 27 themed resort hotels, nine non-Disney hotels, two water parks, four golf courses and other recreational venues. Florida's first major amusement park, Cypress Gardens, was redeveloped into Legoland Florida which opened in 2011. Other major theme parks in the area include Universal Orlando, SeaWorld Orlando, and Busch Gardens Tampa.

Florida also has a large number of middle tier amusement parks, Gatorland is a prime example, which compete with both the major amusement parks and the smaller tourist traps.

== Outdoor recreation ==
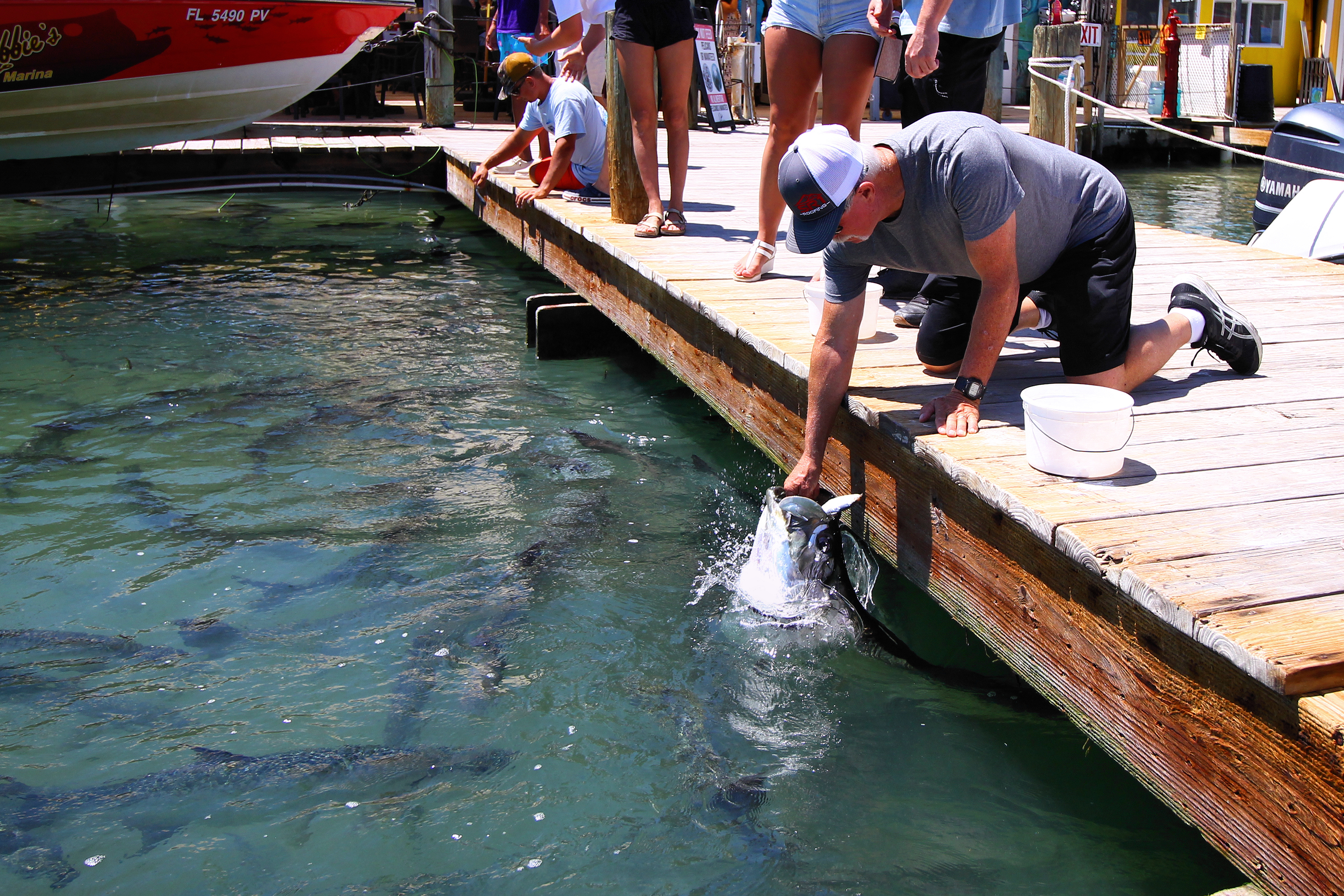
Tourists hand feeding Atlantic tarpon in Islamorada, Florida

Florida's many state parks and protected areas receive a lot of visitors as well with 25.2 million visitors visiting Florida State Parks in 2013.

The Everglades are a major outdoor tourist attraction, however drought periodically impacts the industry.

The economic benefits associated with outdoor recreation and ecotourism are often used as justification for protecting Florida's natural environment, however outdoor recreation, overtourism, and the consumption and development associated with tourism can also have negative impacts on Florida's natural environment.

=== Bird watching ===
The Great Florida Birding Trail is a major bird watching trail set up by the Florida Fish and Wildlife Conservation Commission. The first section opened in 1998 and it extended statewide by 2006.

=== Hunting ===
Florida's hunting industry is worth more than a billion dollars annually. Commercial hunting ranches provide hunting opportunities to both Floridians and tourists. Many are operated as game farms. Hunting ranches and preserves sometimes operate as private clubs.

Some hunters travel to south Florida to target the endemic Osceola turkey. Tourists and guides which cater to them have also started to target invasive Green Iguanas as their range expands in the state.

=== Fishing ===
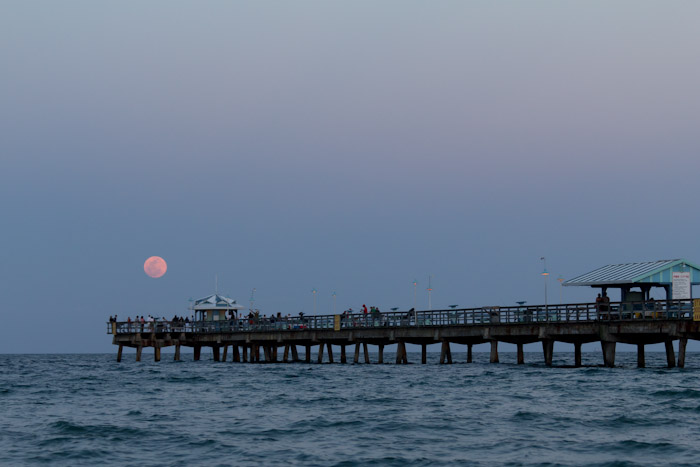
A public fishing pier in Lauderdale by the Sea

Recreational fishing is a major attractor of tourists to Florida. The tourism industry is also a driver of commercial fishing in Florida. Florida has many fishing guides but does not have a state level guide licensing scheme. Atlantic tarpon are a mainstay of Florida's fishing guides with many of them specializing in fly fishing for them. Tarpon in Florida were historically taken with harpoons but hook and line fishing for them by out of state anglers began in 1885 or so. The tarpon fishing focused Izaak Walton Club on Useppa Island opened in the early 20th century. Sport fishing in the Boca Grande Pass began in the 1880s.

Islamorada in the Florida Keys is a major charter fishing hub with charter operations going back to the late 1930s. Bud N' Mary's Marina in Islamorada is particularly well known for its history of hosting out of state anglers and fishing boats. Stuart, Florida contends for the title of "The Sailfish Capital of the World" with many local guides specializing in that species.

Hurricanes can have a negative impact on the number of fishing tourists.

The hall of fame of the International Game Fish Association is located in Dania Beach.

== Space tourism ==
Tourists also come to Florida to watch rocket launches in person and to explore the State's long history of space related activity. The Kennedy Space Center Visitor Complex received 1.7 million tourists in 2016.

Space related tourism is seen as a way for the state to moderate the booms and busts of the space launch business with a steady source of income.

=== Space Coast Office of Tourism ===
The Space Coast Office of Tourism is the body responsible for the marketing of tourism operations in Brevard County, Florida, United States. The office is funded through the Tourist Development Tax, which is then used to provide advertising and marketing and other projects for the region and to develop tourism-related programs.

== Cruise tourism ==
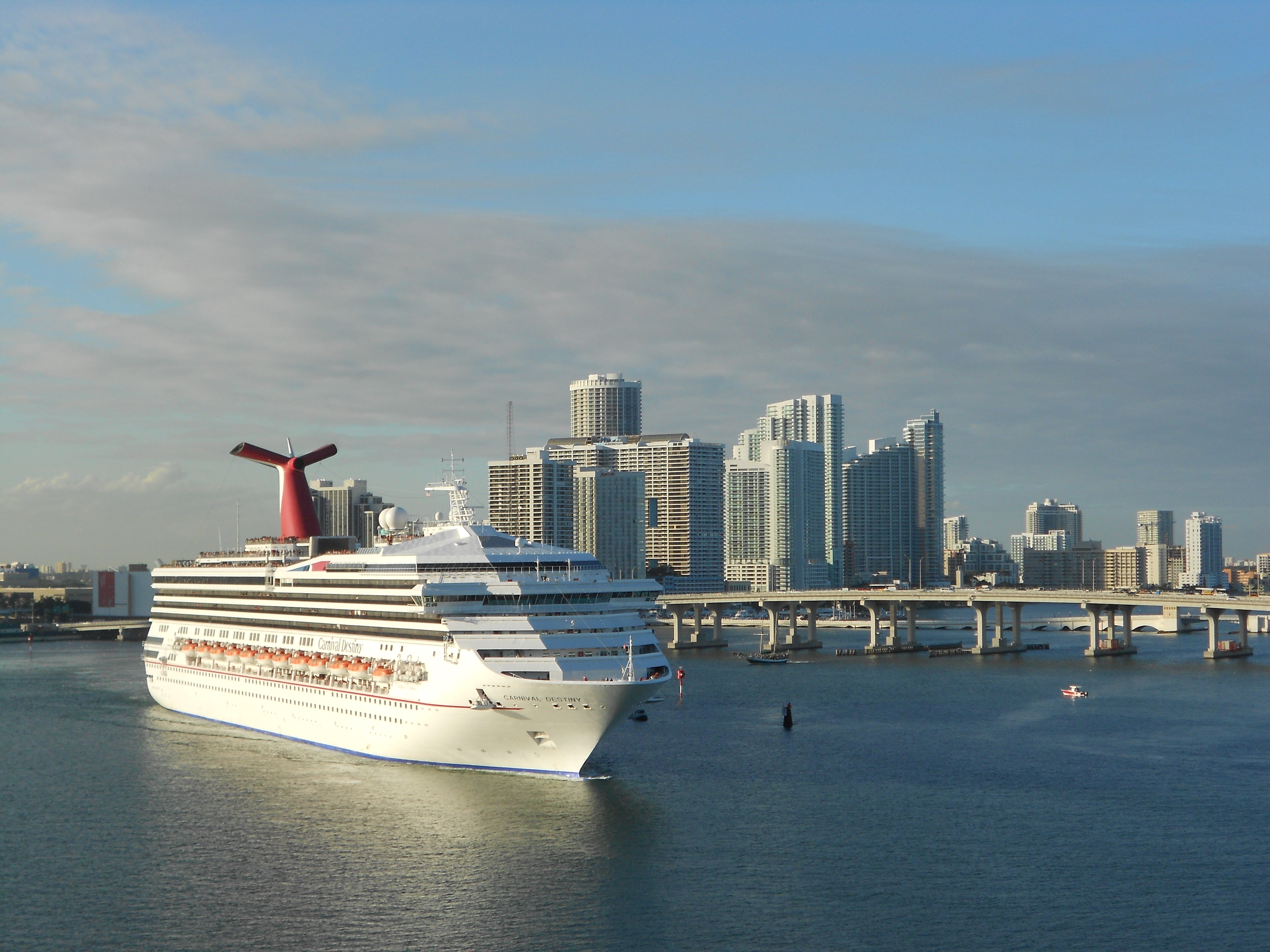
PortMiami is the world's largest cruise ship port

PortMiami is the busiest cruise/passenger port in the world. It accommodates major cruise lines such as Carnival, Royal Caribbean, Norwegian and MSC, among others, and also serves as the homeport of the largest cruise ship in the world by gross tonnage, Icon of the Seas. Over 7.2 million cruise passengers pass through the port each year (FY2023/2024).

== Sports tourism ==
=== Auto racing ===
==== Daytona 500 ====
The Daytona 500 is a 500-mile-long (805 km) NASCAR Cup Series motor race held annually at Daytona International Speedway in Daytona Beach, Florida. It is the first of two Cup races held every year at Daytona, the second being the Coke Zero Sugar 400, and one of three held in Florida, with the annual Straight Talk Wireless 400 being held at Homestead south of Miami. From 1988 to 2019, it was one of the four restrictor plate races on the Cup schedule. The inaugural Daytona 500 was held in 1959 coinciding with the opening of the speedway and since 1982, it has been the season-opening race of the Cup Series.

The Daytona 500 is regarded as the most important and prestigious race on the NASCAR calendar, carrying by far the largest purse. Championship points awarded are equal to that of any other NASCAR Cup Series race. It is also the series' first race of the year; this phenomenon is unique in sports, which tend to have championships or other major events at the end of the season rather than the start. From 1995–2020, U.S. television ratings for the Daytona 500 were the highest for any auto race of the year, surpassing the traditional leader, the Indianapolis 500 which in turn greatly surpasses the Daytona 500 in gate attendance and international viewing. In 2021 the Indianapolis 500 surpassed the Daytona 500 in TV ratings and viewership. The 2006 Daytona 500 attracted the sixth largest average live global TV audience of any sporting event that year with 20 million viewers. As of 2026, the capacity is 102,000.

The race serves as the final event of Speedweeks and is also known as "The Great American Race" or the "Super Bowl of Stock Car Racing". Since its inception, the race has been held in mid-to-late February. From 1971 to 2011, and again since 2018, the event has been as associated with Presidents Day weekend, falling usually on the third Sunday of February. Since 2022, it has been held one week after the Super Bowl, the same day as the NBA All-Star Game, and on eight occasions, it has been run on Valentine's Day.

Since 1997, the winner of the Daytona 500 has been presented with the Harley J. Earl Trophy in Victory Lane, and the winning car is displayed in race-winning condition for one year at Daytona 500 Experience, a museum and gallery adjacent to Daytona International Speedway.

==== Miami Grand Prix ====
The Miami Grand Prix is a Formula One Grand Prix which was held for the first time during the 2022 season, with the event taking place at the Miami International Autodrome which is located around the grounds and private facilities of Hard Rock Stadium in Miami Gardens, Florida, a suburb of Miami located 16 miles (26 km) north of downtown Miami. The race has been held on the first Sunday of May and the day after the Kentucky Derby.

== Politics ==
Due to its economic significance and large workforce the tourism industry is important in the Politics of Florida. Florida politicians have generally been supportive of the tourism industry, however there has been some conflict between politicians and the industry over social issues including Disney v. DeSantis which involved the Central Florida Tourism Oversight District.

A special Tourist Development Tax is levied on visitors with funds directed to local Tourist Development Councils.

=== Visit Florida ===
Visit Florida (stylized as VISIT FLORIDA) is Florida's official tourism marketing corporation, serving as Florida's official source for travel planning to visitors across the globe. Visit Florida operates as a nonprofit corporation, it was created as a public/private partnership by the Florida Legislature in 1996.

== Popular culture ==
Florida's image in popular culture has been shaped by promoters, advertisers, and developers since the 1800s. The relatively new medium of photography was heavily used by these early boosters and entrepreneurs, William Henry Jackson was particularly active in this early work. Postcards were also introduced around this time and became a key component in Florida's wider promotion. Popular depictions of Florida emphasized sunshine and flowers why de-emphasizing shade and bugs which shaped larger misconceptions about Florida.

The silent film A Florida Enchantment (1914) was one of the first to feature Florida as an exotic vacation destination of the wealthy where traditional northern norms did not necessarily hold, this representation of Florida as a playground or fairytale land would continue.

== Florida tourism lists ==
- List of amusement parks in Central Florida
- List of casinos in Florida
- List of cathedrals in Florida
- List of historic houses in Florida
- List of forts in Florida
- List of museums in Florida
- List of airports in Florida
- List of lighthouses in Florida
- List of nature centers in Florida
- List of Michelin-starred restaurants in Florida
- List of sites in the South section of the Great Florida Birding Trail
- List of shopping malls in the Miami metropolitan area
- List of festivals in Florida

== See also ==
- Florida state forests
- Spring training
- Port Canaveral
- Port Everglades
- Everglades National Park
- Dry Tortugas National Park
- Biscayne National Park
- Floribbean cuisine
- Cuisine of Florida
- Reedy Creek Improvement Act
- Agriculture in Florida
