= List of amusement parks in Central Florida =

This is a list of amusement parks operating in the Central Florida area of Florida, United States.

Resort	Name	Location	Operator	Opened
Walt Disney World Resort	Magic Kingdom	Bay Lake	Disney Experiences	1971
Walt Disney World Resort	Epcot	Bay Lake	Disney Experiences	1982
Walt Disney World Resort	Disney's Hollywood Studios	Bay Lake	Disney Experiences	1989
Walt Disney World Resort	Disney's Animal Kingdom	Bay Lake	Disney Experiences	1998
None	Daytona Lagoon	Daytona Beach	DBWP, LLC	2005
None	Fun Spot America - Kissimmee	Kissimmee	Fun Spot America Theme Parks	2007
None	Give Kids the World Village	Kissimmee	Give Kids the World Village	1989
Old Town		Kissimmee	The Travel Corporation	1986
None	Kennedy Space Center Visitor Complex	Merritt Island	Delaware North	1967
None	Fun Spot America - Orlando	Orlando	Fun Spot America Theme Parks	1997
None	Gatorland	Orlando	Gatorland	1949
Icon Park		Orlando	Merlin Entertainments	2015
None	SeaWorld Orlando	Orlando	United Parks & Resorts	1973
Universal Orlando Resort	Universal Studios Florida	Orlando	Universal Destinations & Experiences	1990
Universal Orlando Resort	Universal Islands of Adventure	Orlando	Universal Destinations & Experiences	1999
Universal Orlando Resort	Universal Epic Universe	Orlando	Universal Destinations & Experiences	2025
None	Dinosaur World	Plant City	Dinosaur World	1998
None	Busch Gardens Tampa Bay	Tampa	United Parks & Resorts	1959
None	ZooTampa at Lowry Park	Tampa	Lowry Park Zoological Society	1957
None	Weeki Wachee Springs	Weeki Wachee	Florida Department of Environmental Protection	1947
Legoland Florida Resort	Legoland Florida	Winter Haven	Merlin Entertainments	2011
Legoland Florida Resort	Peppa Pig Theme Park	Winter Haven	Merlin Entertainments	2022

== See also ==
- List of amusement parks in the Americas
- Florida tourism industry
