= Space Coast Office of Tourism =

- Type: GO
- Purpose: Tourism
- Headquarters: Cocoa Beach, Florida, United States
- Region served: Space Coast
- Executive Director: Peter Cranis
- Website: https://www.visitspacecoast.com/

The Space Coast Office of Tourism is the body responsible for the marketing of tourism operations in Brevard County, Florida, United States. The office is funded through the Tourist Development Tax, which is then used to provide advertising and marketing and other projects for the region and to develop tourism-related programs.

== Background ==
The Space Coast Office of Tourism covers Brevard County, which extends 72 miles (116 km) along the coast of Florida, an area which is considered the Space Coast. Funding for the office comes from a 5% Tourist Development Tax, which is collected from hotels and other tourist accommodations.

The region has traditionally had a strong focus on tourism through the space industry, and the industry accounted for as much as 15% of the tourism in the region, but with a reduction in shuttle launches this dropped to under 5% by 2005. Accordingly, the office had to move their focus to alternative tourism operations, selling "beaches, cruise ships and nature tourism",. Although the Discovery's launch in 2005 did see a return of astronaut imagery, the region's dependency on the space industry was much reduced, and by 2011, when the final Space Shuttle mission took place, the Space Coast Office of Tourism argued that the reduced dependency on the industry would allow the region to cope with the expected economic downfall. Now, in the 2020s, space launches are back in a big way and the Space Coast Office of Tourism heavily promotes all the things they did before like beaches, cruises and nature, along with a heavy mix of imagery showing launches. A return to human space flight in the United States originates from the Space Coast and astronauts are regularly launched to the International Space Station from Kennedy Space Center. There are also many private companies launching rockets to deploy satellites from Cape Canaveral Space Force Station.

== Projects ==
The office is responsible for spending the Tourist Development Tax on advertising and marketing, as well as projects that support tourism such as beach renourishment, grants for events happening in the Space Coast, and capital projects like parks and attractions. The office has traditionally focused on consumer markets. This has included advertising on billboards, digital advertising, TV advertising using cable and streaming services, and radio streaming. They promote themselves in Florida and in parts of northeastern and southeastern United States). In 1992, the office had a budget of $2.5 million, of which $1 million was directed to consumer advertising. By 1998, that figure had changed to $4 million over two years. In 2021, the marketing budget had increased to over $7 million with a total revenue budget of $16.9 million. For FY 2025, the marketing budget is $13.4 million with a total revenue budget of $27 million.

== See also ==
- Florida tourism industry
