= Charlotte Harbor Preserve State Park =

State park in Florida, United States

- IUCN category IV (habitat/species management area)
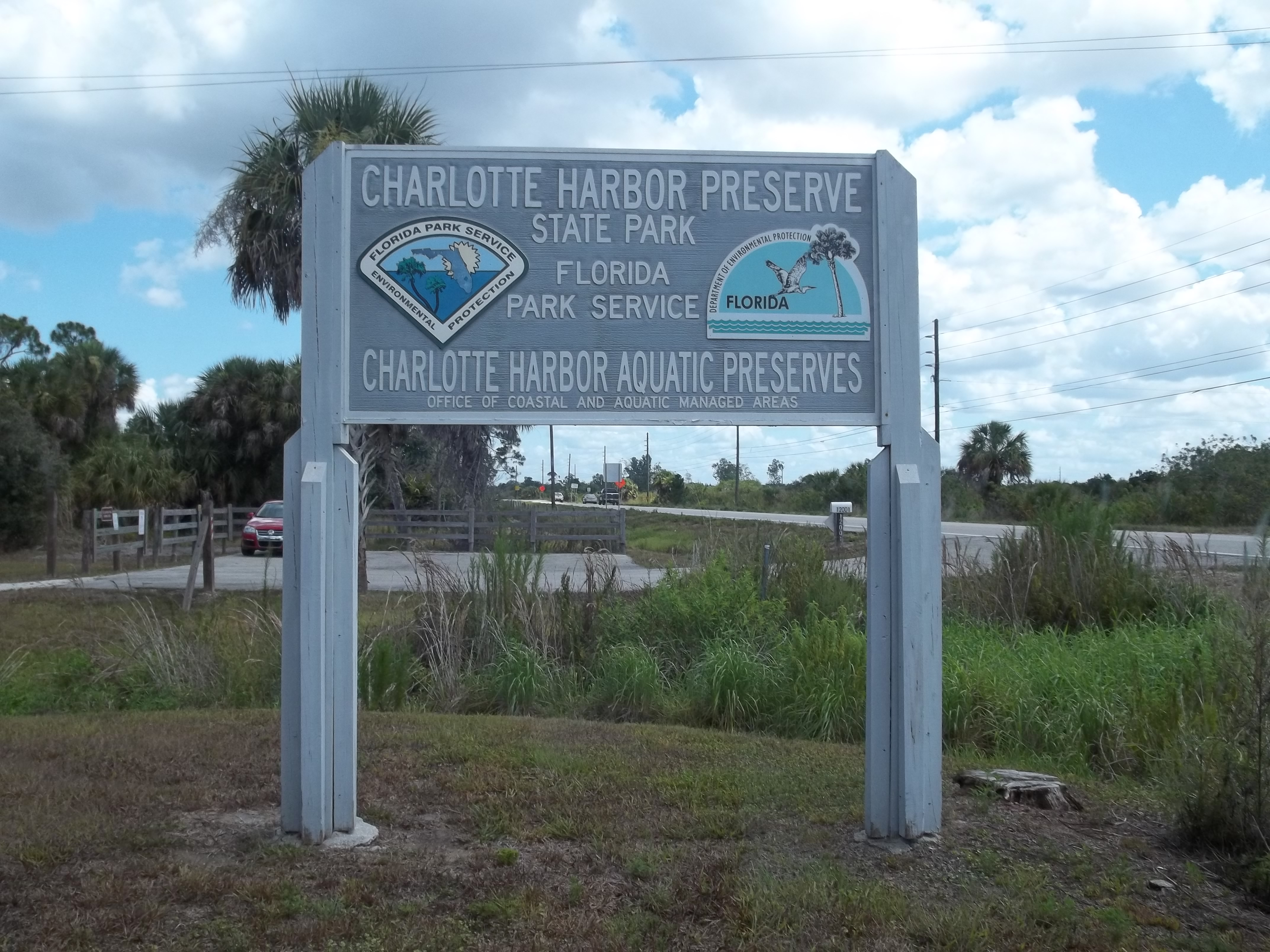
- Sign by entrance

- Location within Florida
- Interactive map of Charlotte Harbor Preserve State Park
- Location: Charlotte County, Florida, USA
- Nearest city: Punta Gorda, Florida
- Coordinates: 26°52′24.73″N 82°1′26.36″W
- Area: 42,518 acres (172.06 km^{2})
- Governing body: Florida Department of Environmental Protection

Charlotte Harbor Preserve State Park is a 46,000-acre (190 km^{2}) Florida State Park, composed of islands and land that surrounds Charlotte Harbor. It is part of the Southwest Florida Water Management District and protects the Gasparilla Sound/ Charlotte Harbor, Cape Haze, Matlacha Pass, and Pine Island Sound aquatic preserves. It is site 22 on southern section of the Great Florida Birding Trail and offers boating, paddling, fishing, and hiking.

The park can be accessed from Punta Gorda, Cape Coral, Cape Haze, El Jobean, Rotonda, and Little Pine Island. The main offices are approximately 3 miles (4.8 km) south of US 41/Tamiami Trail, in Punta Gorda.

The preserve protects more than 100 miles (160 km) of shoreline in Charlotte and Lee counties. Its habitats include mangrove forests, marshes, scrub and pine flatwoods.

== Admission and Hours ==
There is no entrance charge. Florida state parks are open between 8 a.m. and sundown every day of the year (including holidays).

== Gallery ==
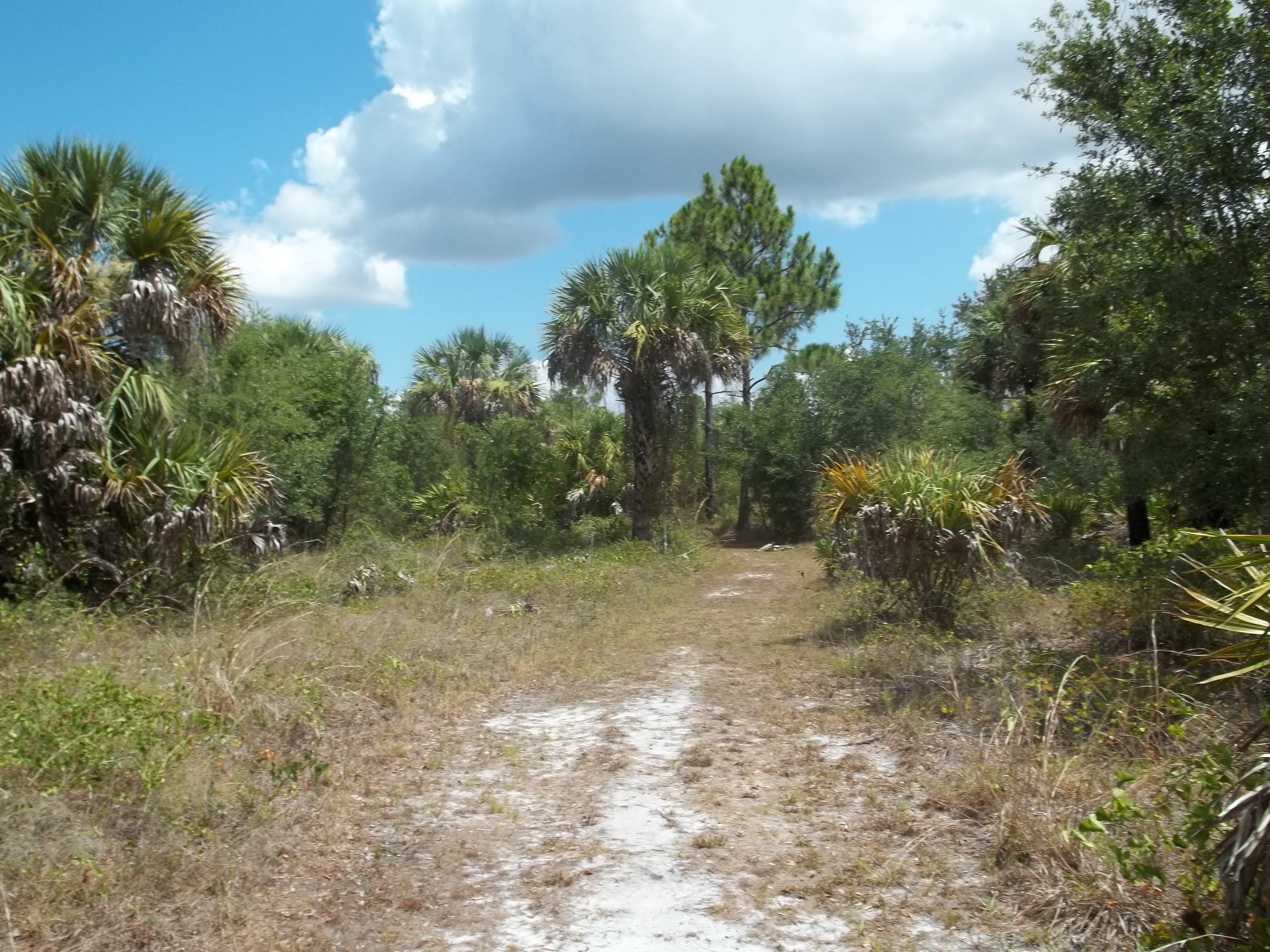
Woods

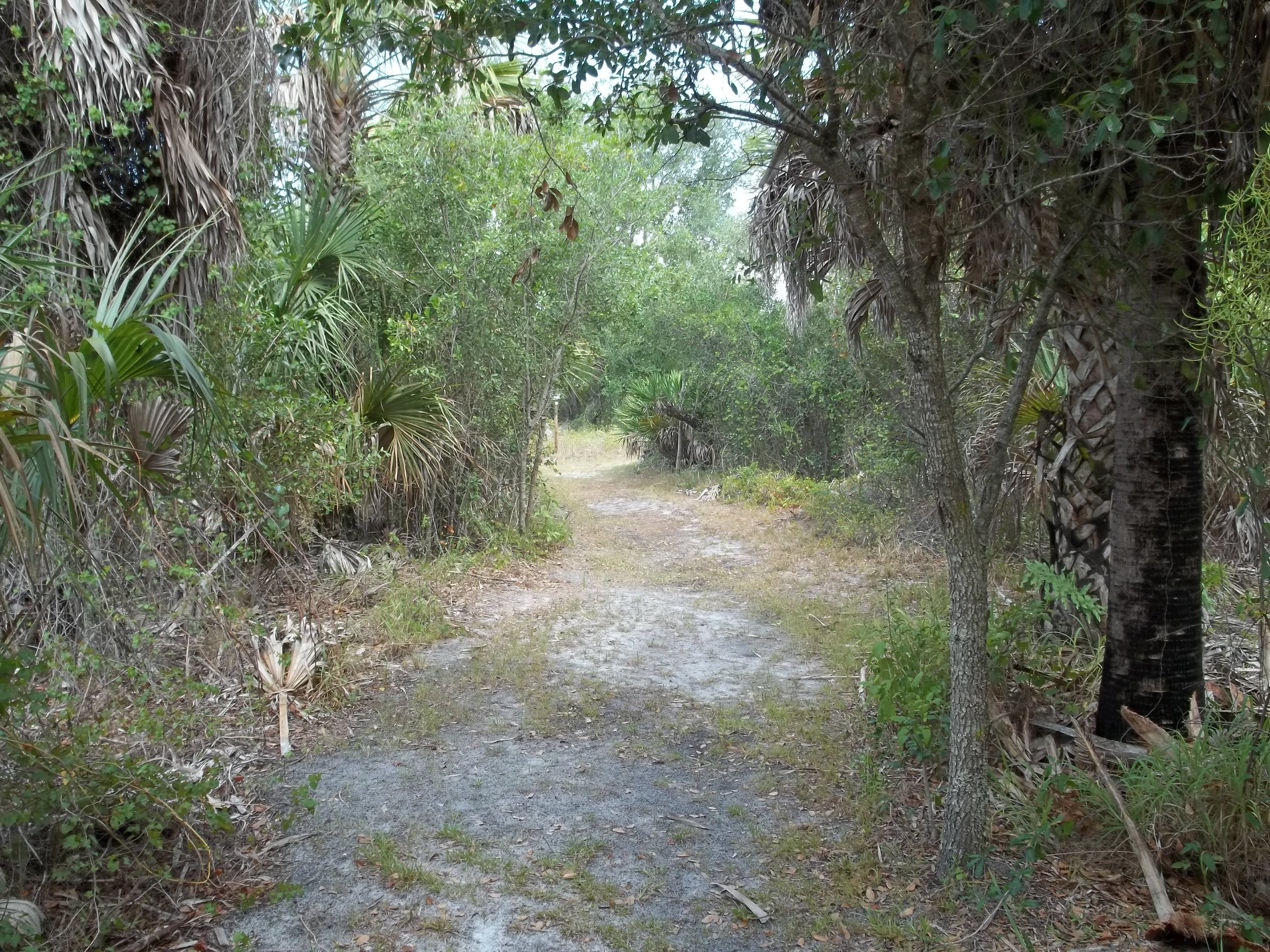
Trail

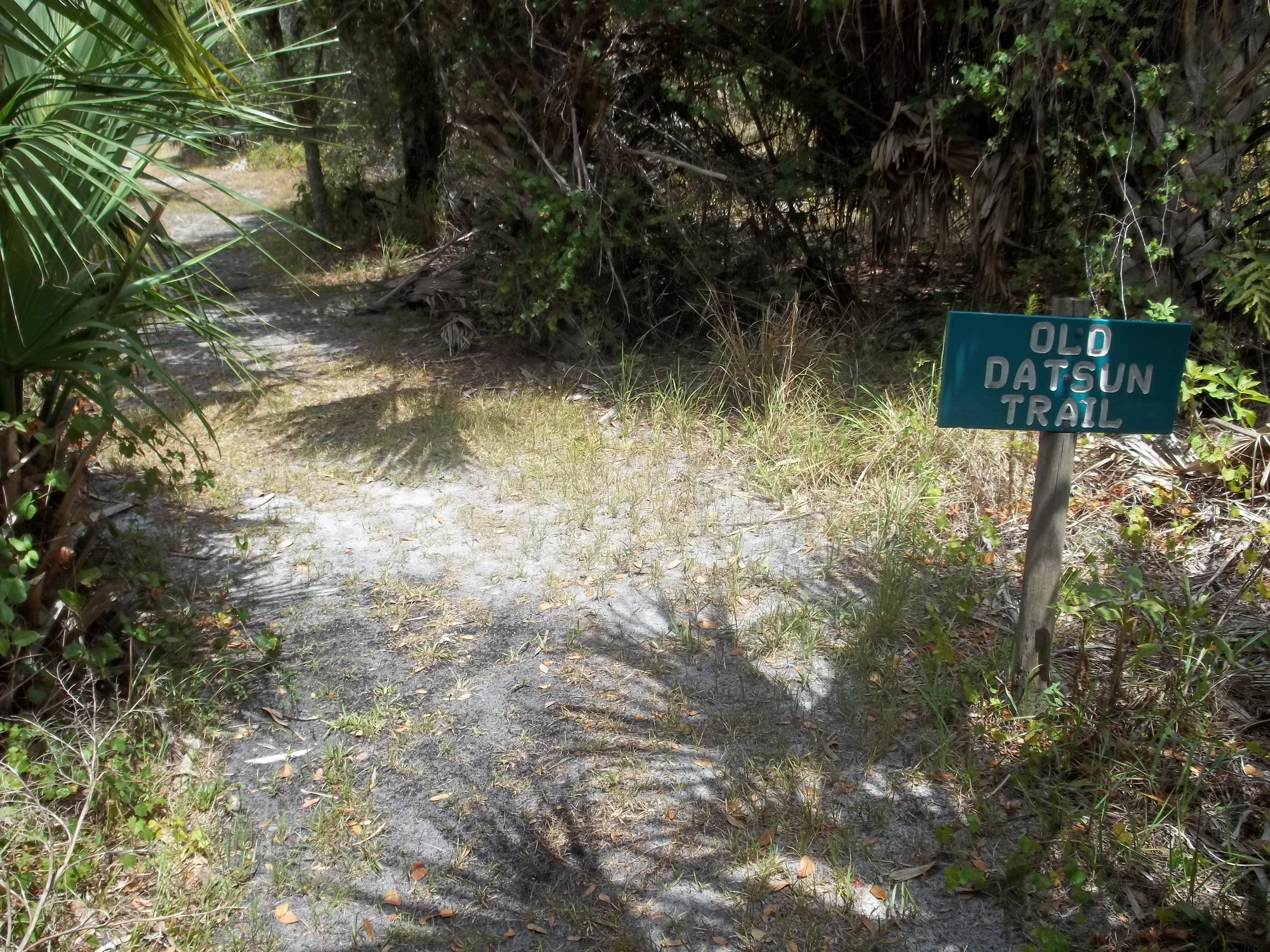
Old Datsun Trail
