= Wakodahatchee Wetlands =

Recreation wetlands in Florida, United States

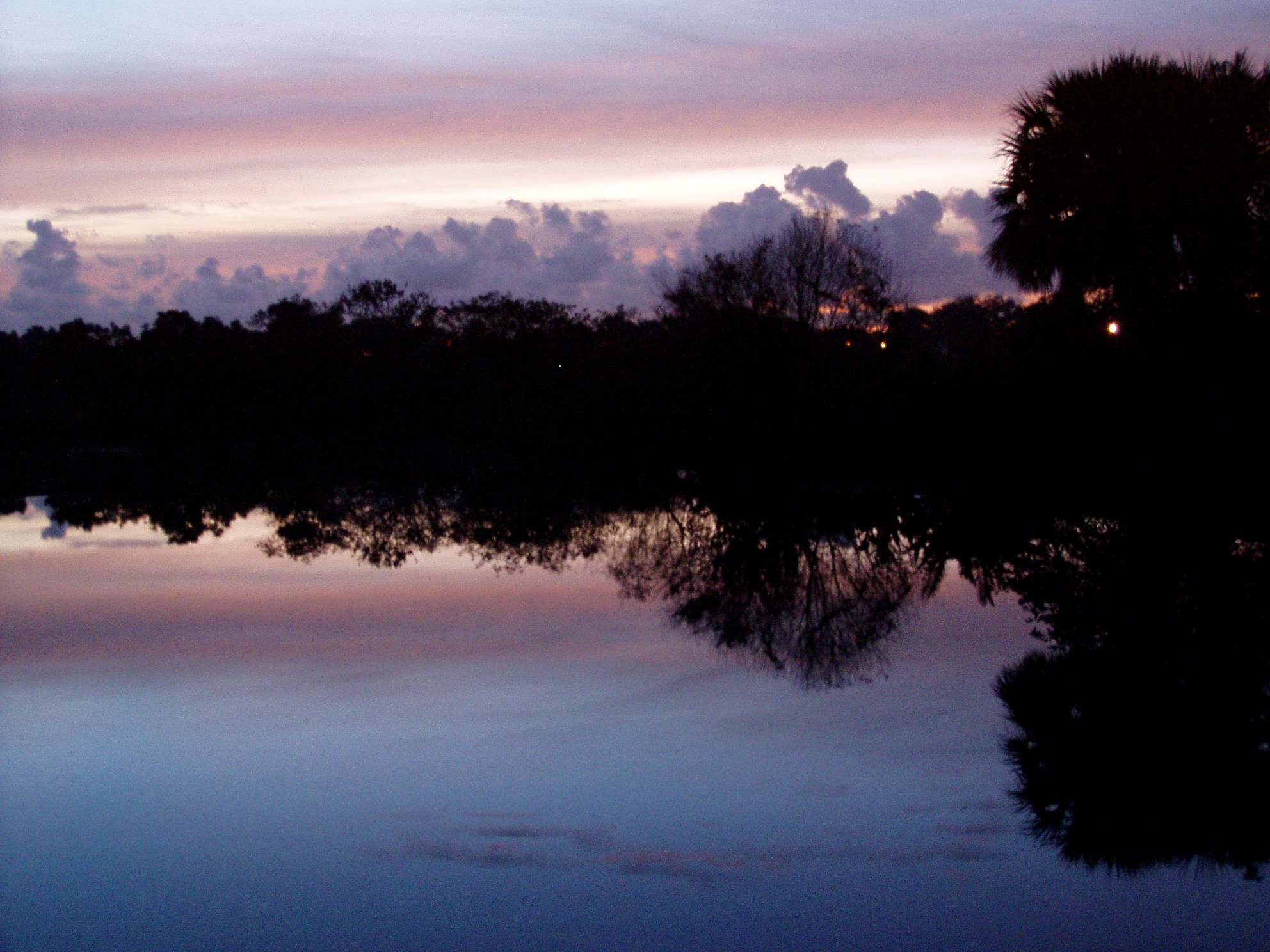
- Interactive map of Wakodahatchee Wetlands
- Location: Delray Beach, FL
- Coordinates: 26°28′47″N 80°08′33″W
- Area: 50 acres (20 ha)

The Wakodahatchee Wetlands is a park located in Delray Beach, Florida. The park was created on 50 acres (20 ha) of unused utility land and transformed into a recreation wetlands open to the public with a three-quarter mile boardwalk that crosses between open water pond areas, emergent marsh areas, shallow shelves, and islands with shrubs and snags to foster nesting and roosting. The boardwalk has interpretive signage as well as gazebos with benches along the way. This site is part of the South section of the Great Florida Birding Trail and offers many opportunities to observe birds in their natural habitats.

== Water reclamation ==
Each day, the Palm Beach County Water Utilities Department’s Southern Region Water Reclamation Facility pumps approximately two million gallons of 90% treated water into the Wakodahatchee Wetlands. This water, which is free of organic contaminants but still contains excess mineral content, is naturally purified by the plants and algae in the wetlands, then released into the surface water supply.

== Fauna ==
Over 150 species of birds have been spotted inside the park, including wood stork, pied-billed grebe, snowy egrets, and black-bellied whistling ducks. The park is also home to turtles, alligators, rabbits, frogs, and raccoons.

Wood stork nest by the boardwalk

== Flora ==
Plants within the park include pond apple, sabal palm, live oak, pickerelweed, duckweed, and giant bulrush.

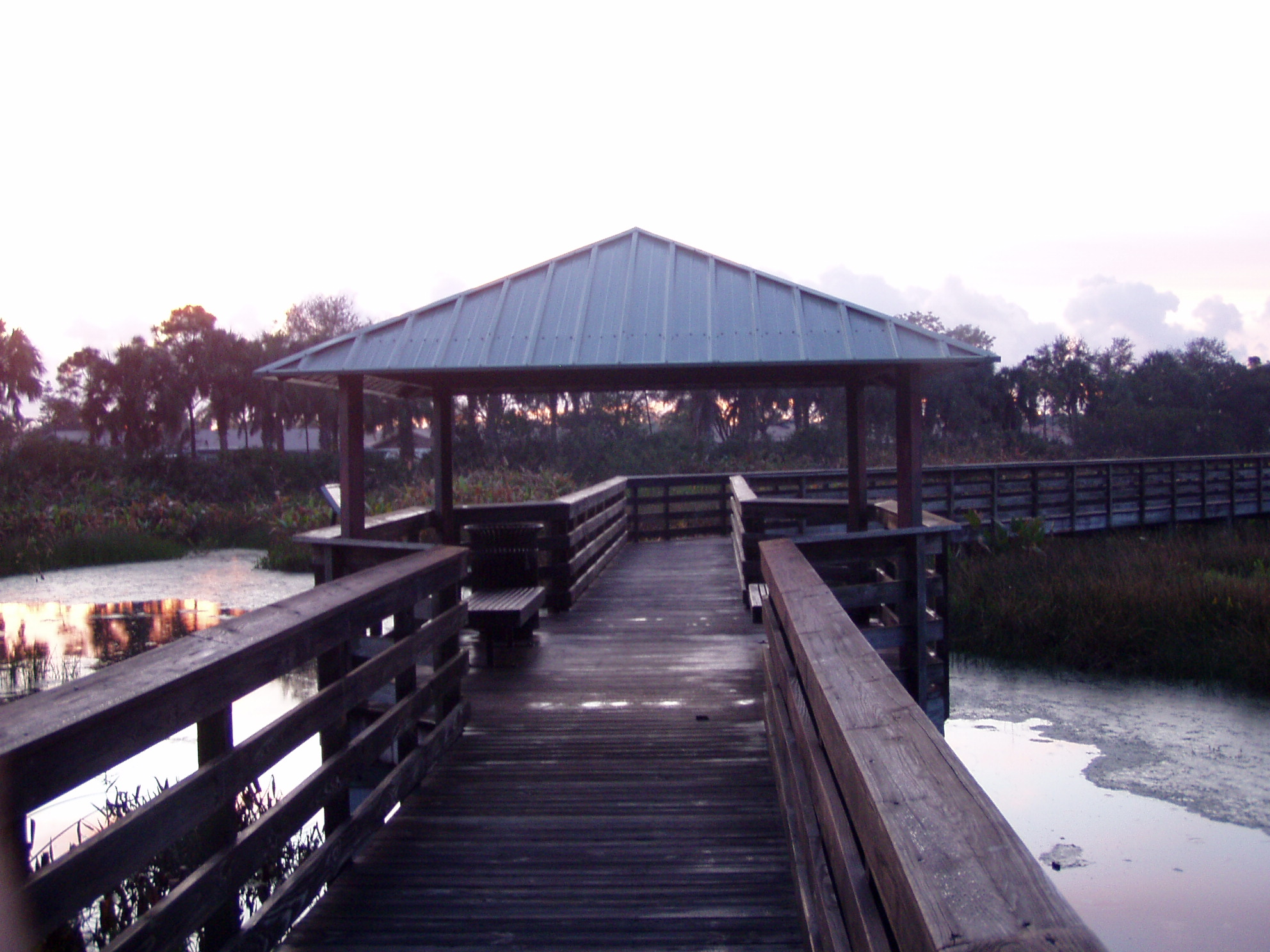
Boardwalk and gazebo

== Gallery ==
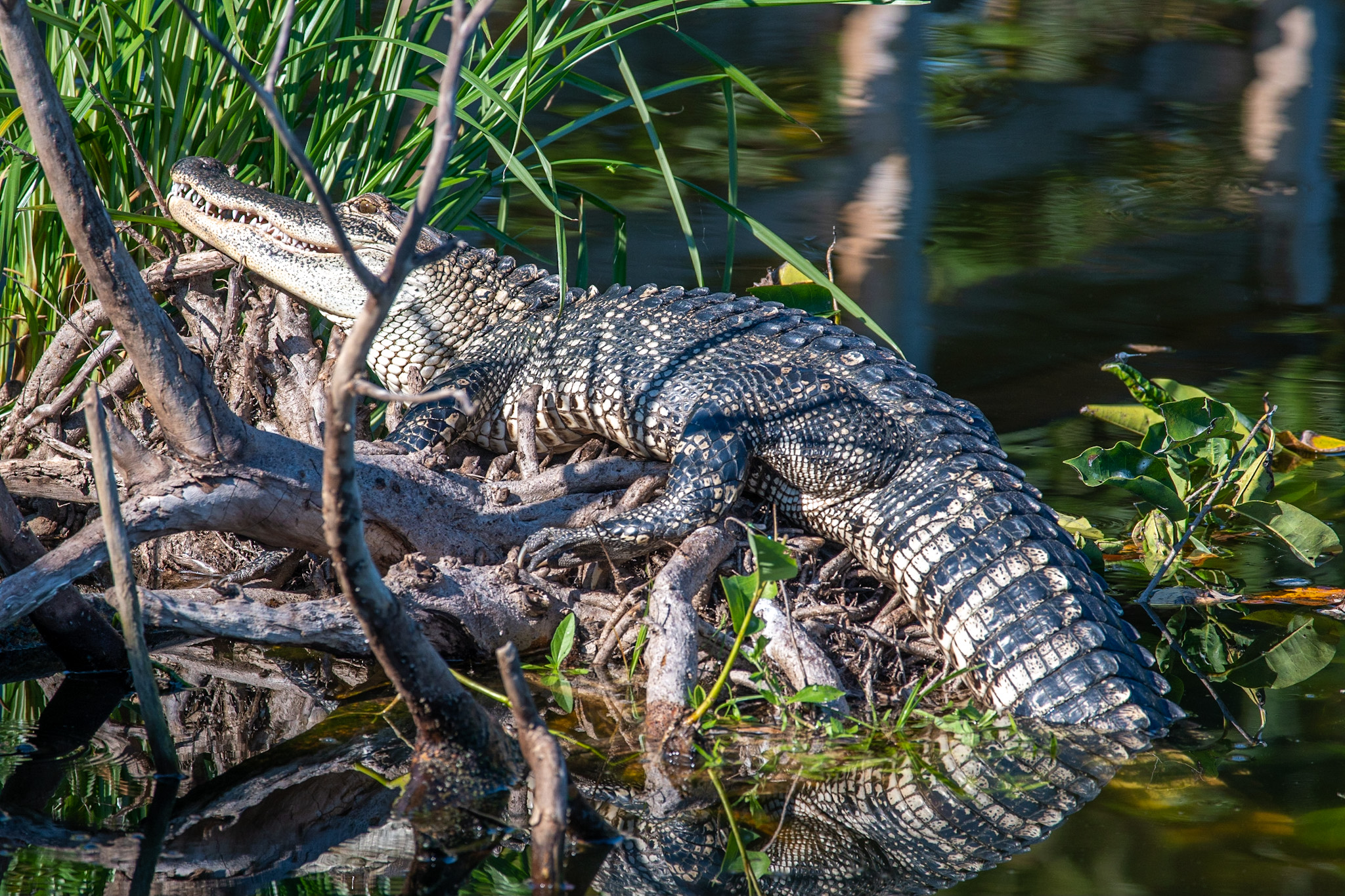
American alligator

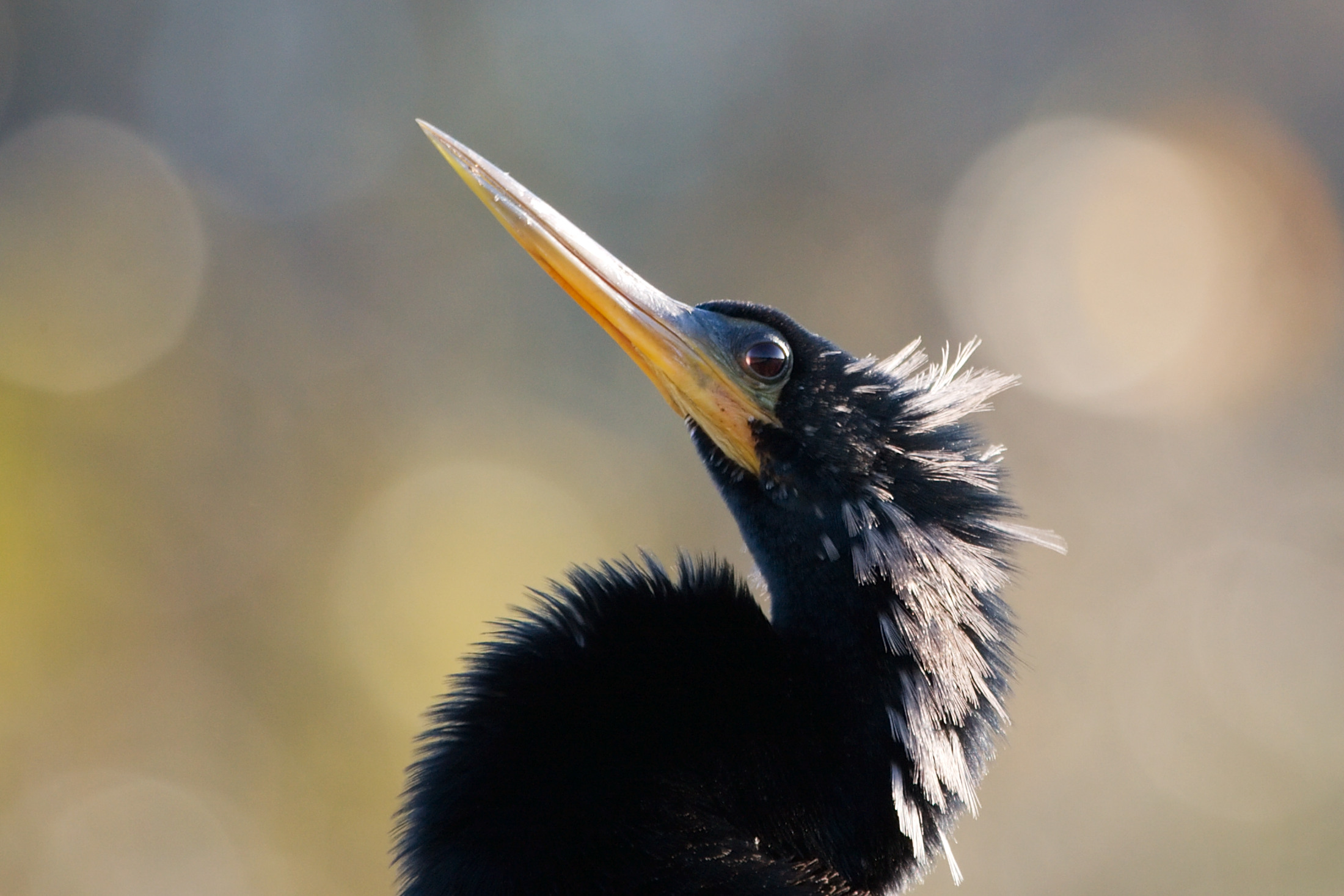
Anhinga

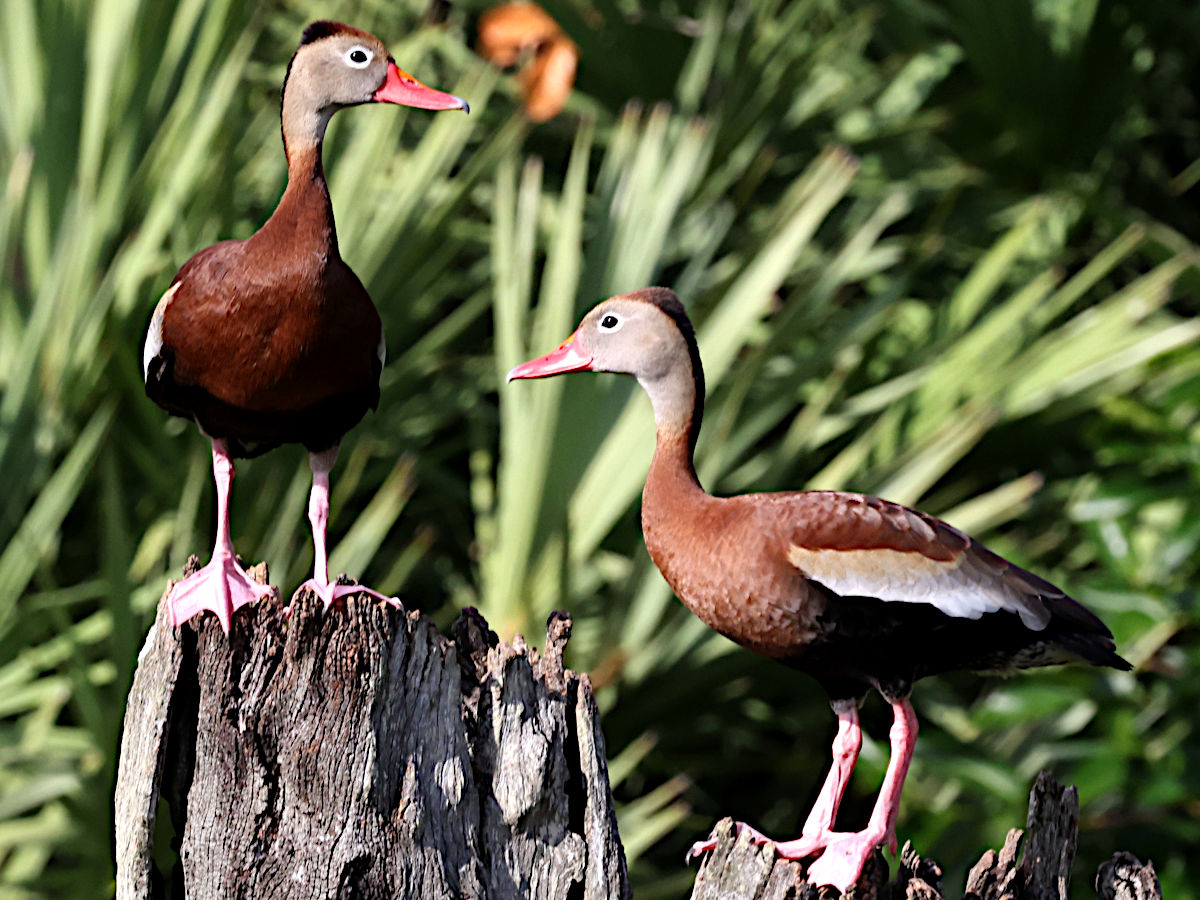
Black-bellied whistling-duck

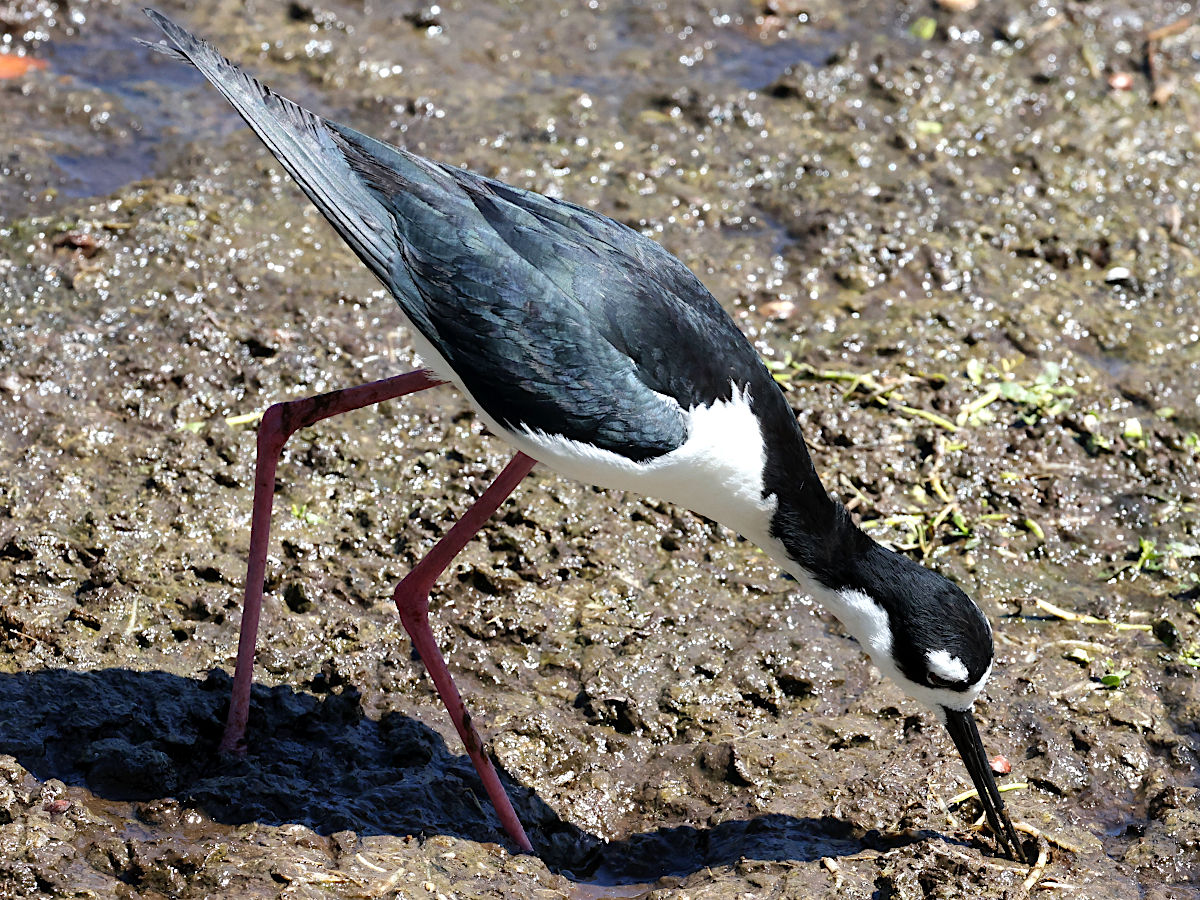
Black-necked stilt

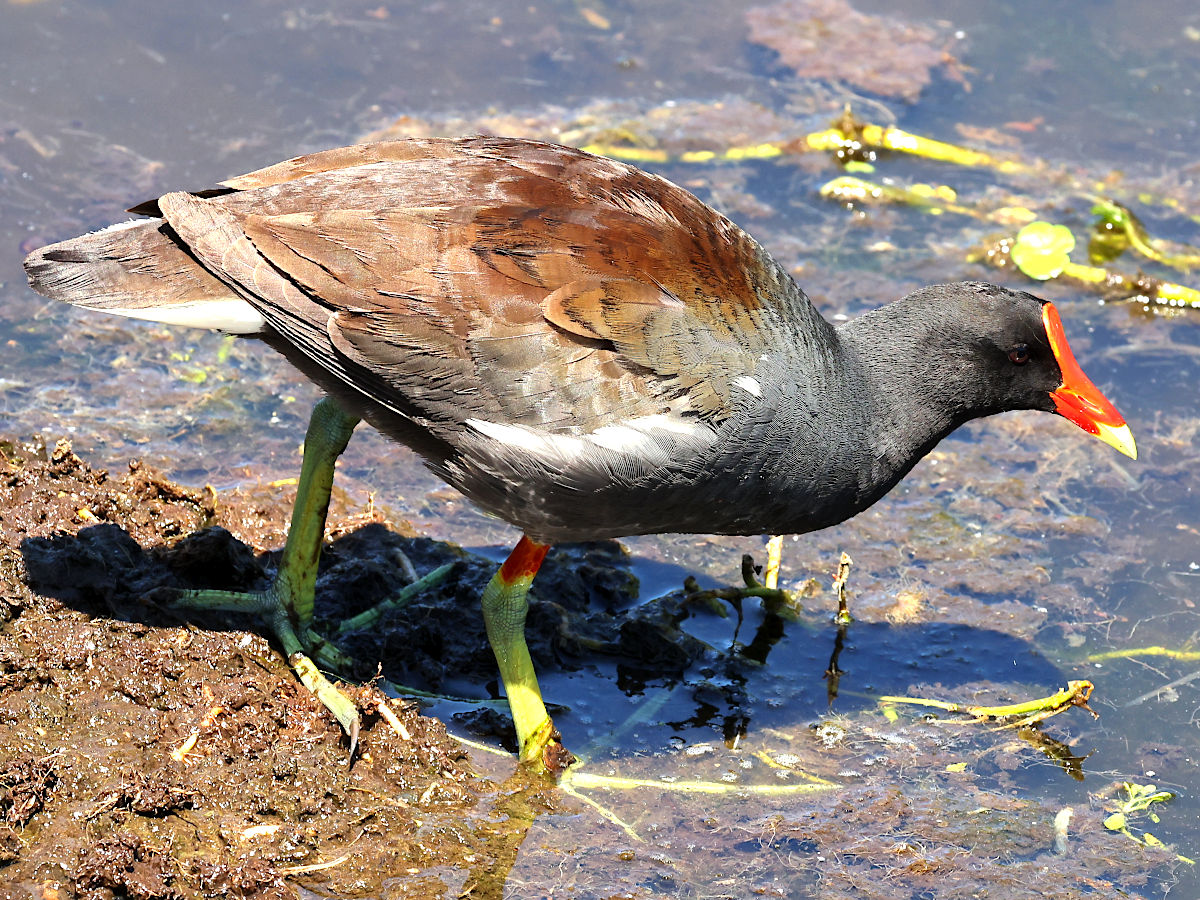
Common gallinule

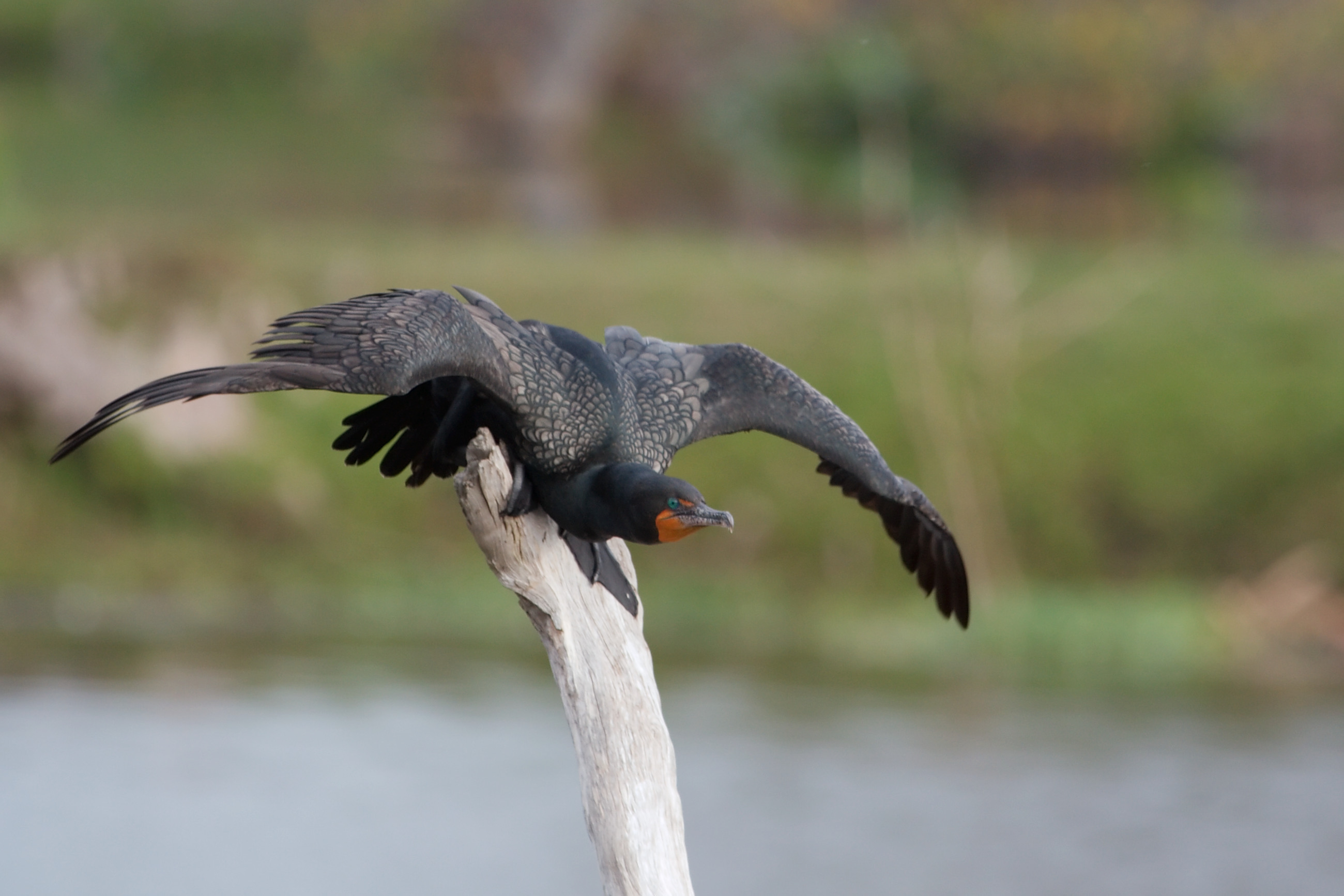
Double-crested cormorant

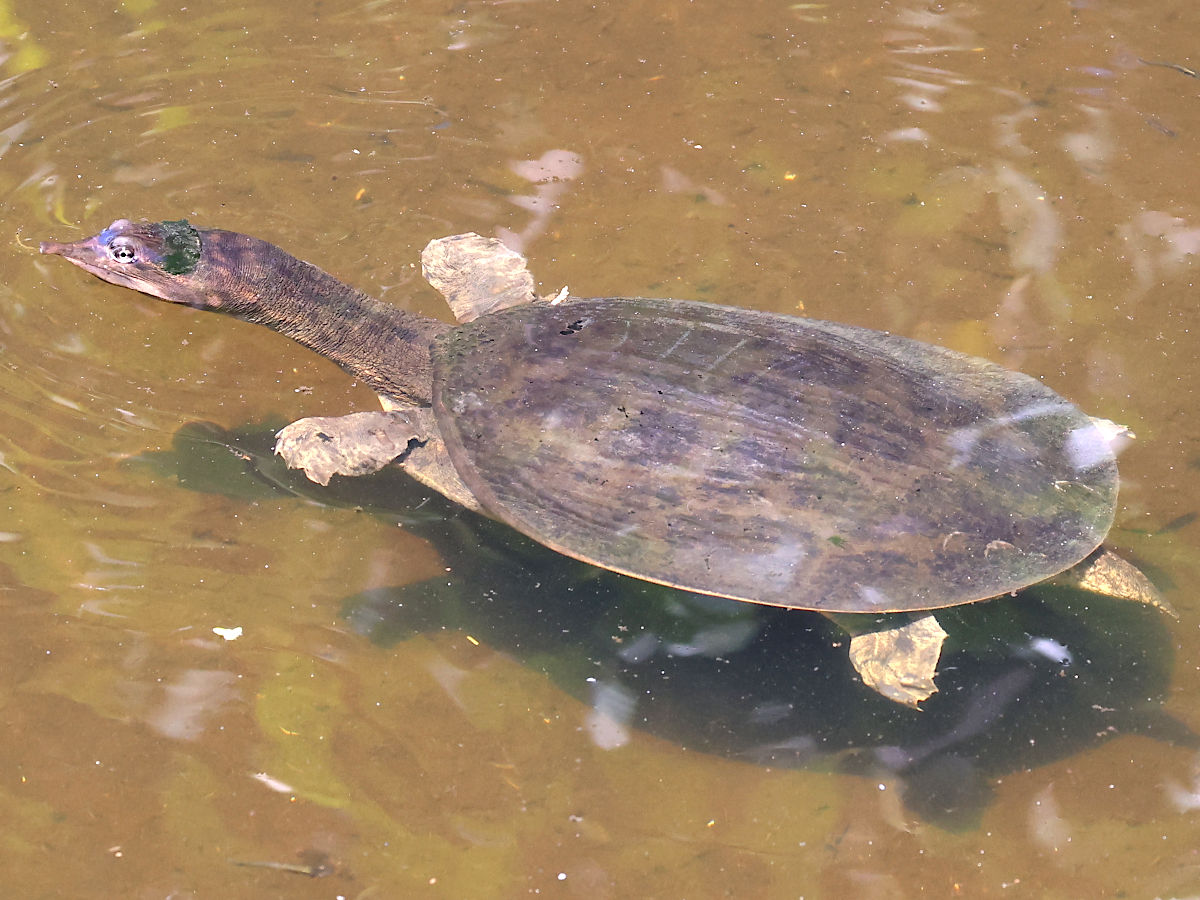
Florida softshell turtle

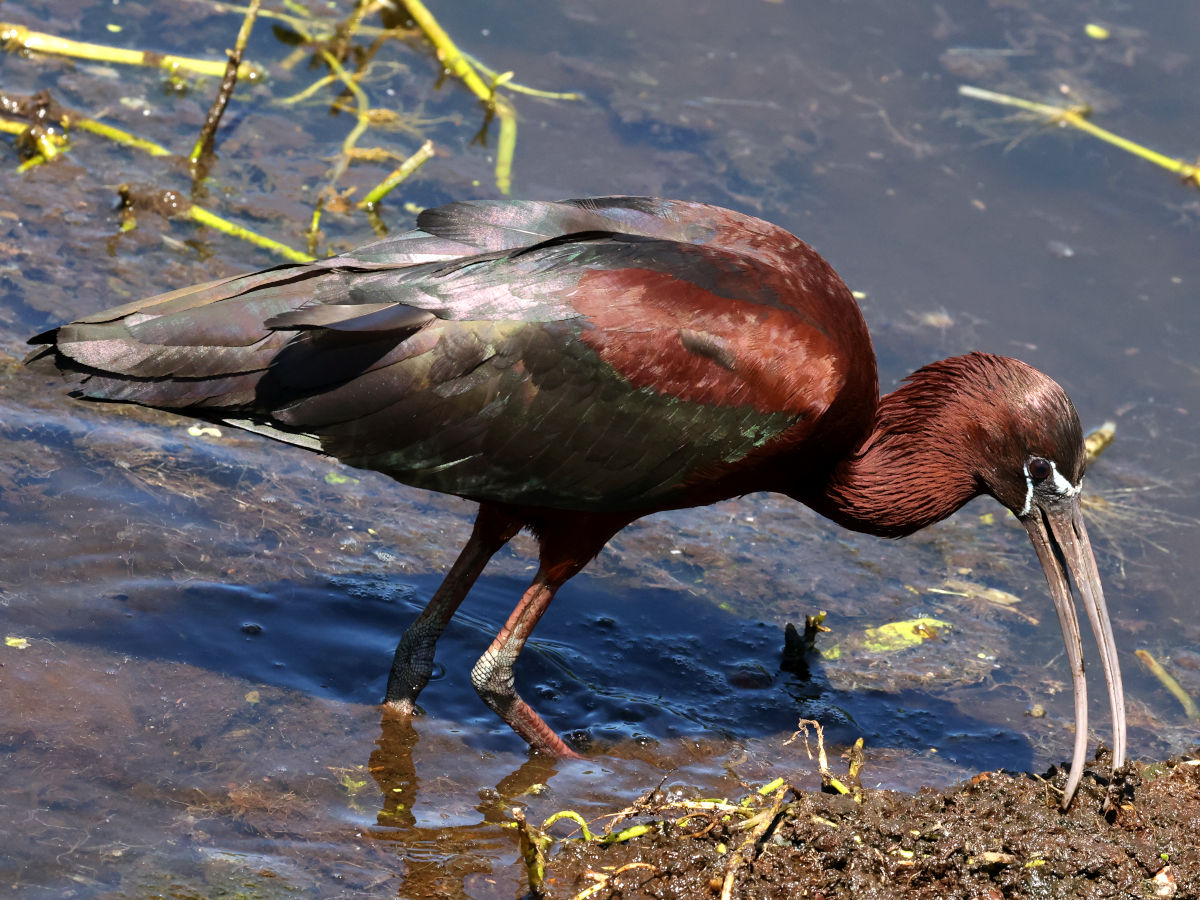
Glossy ibis

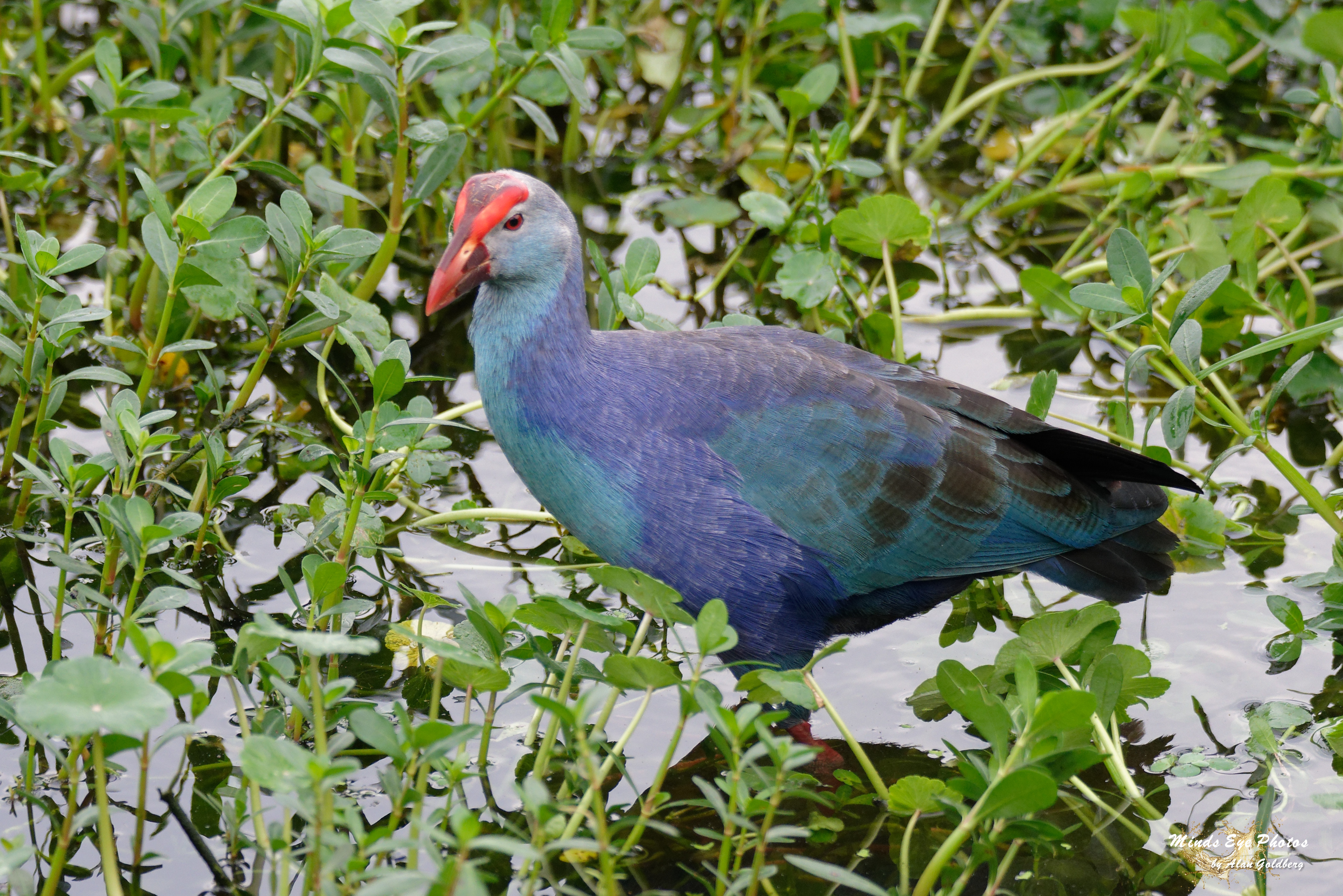
Gray-headed swamphen

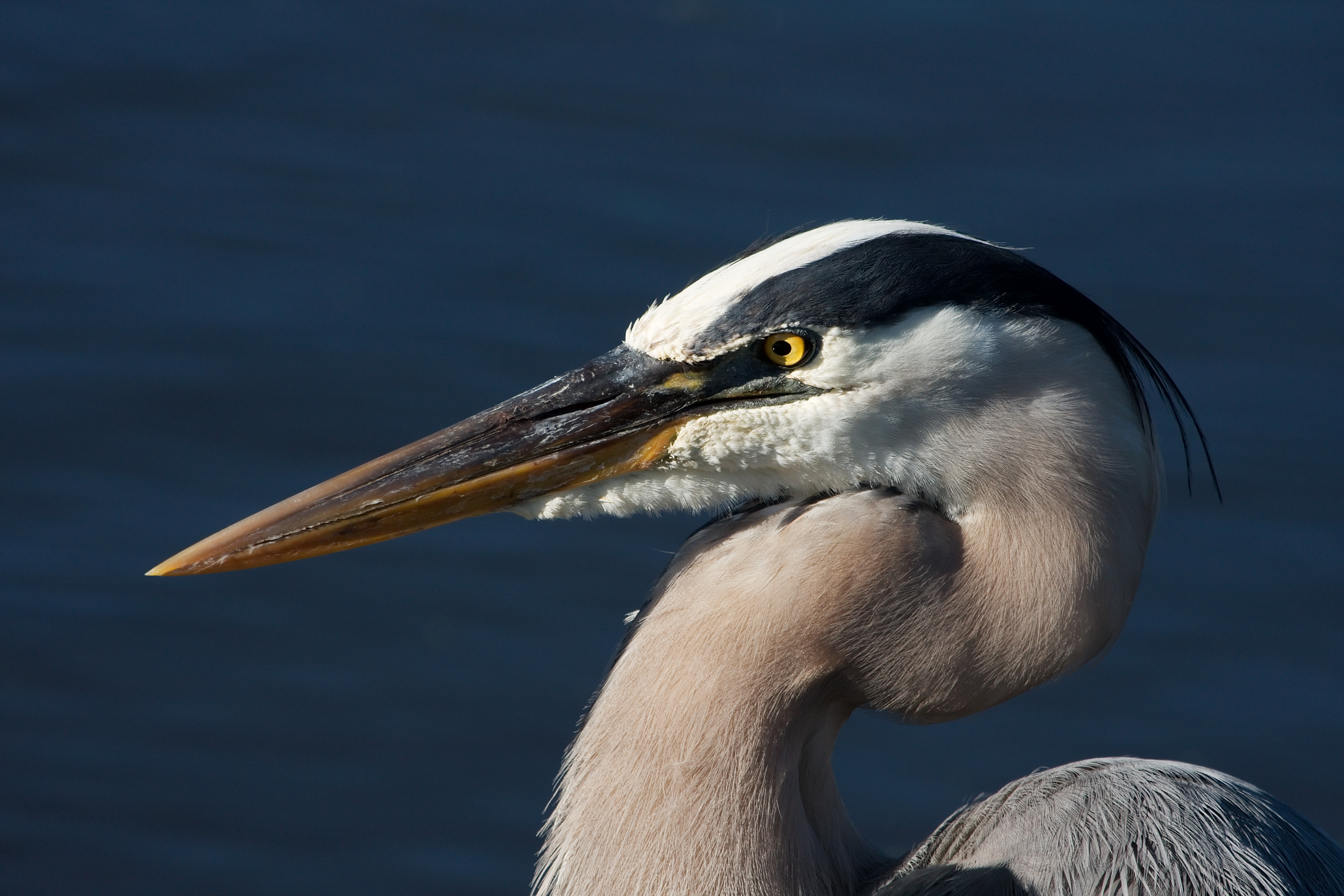
Great blue heron

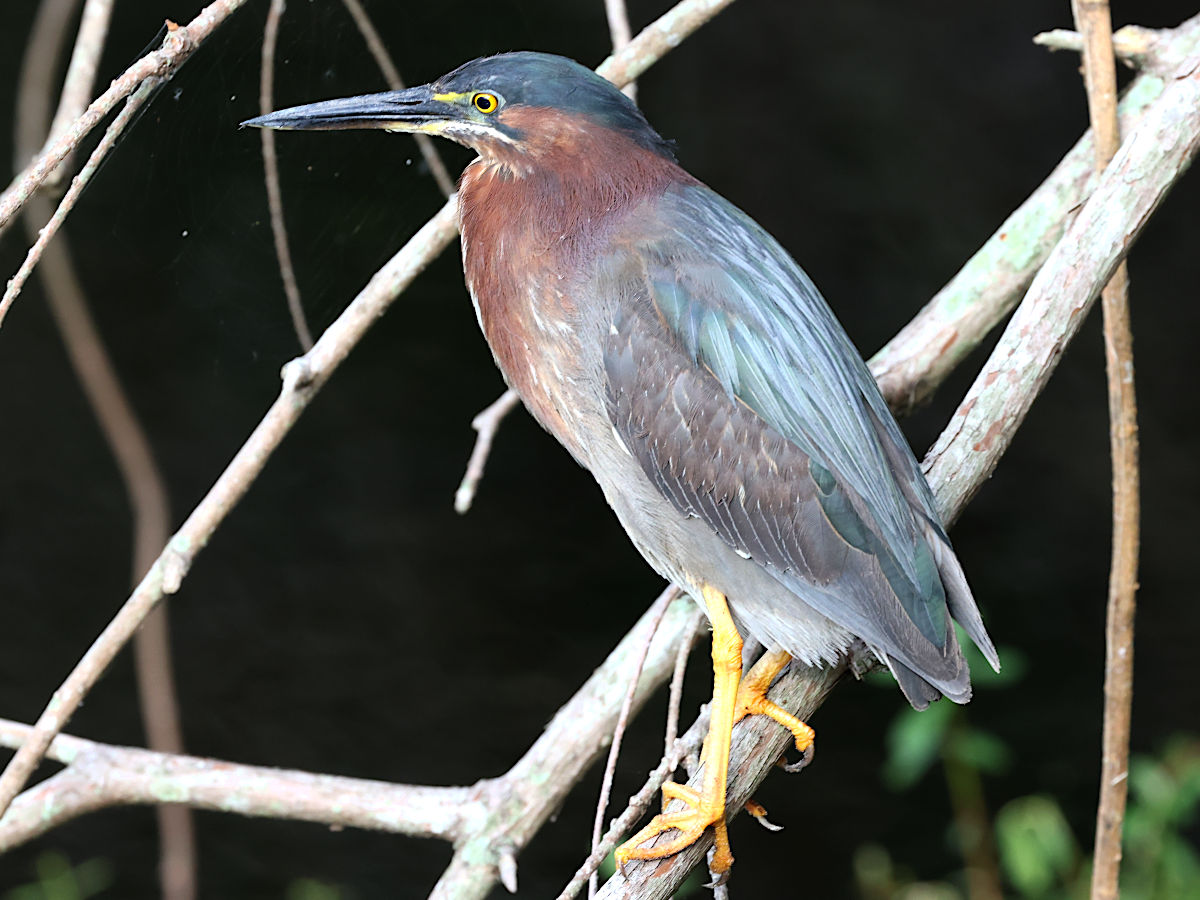
Green heron

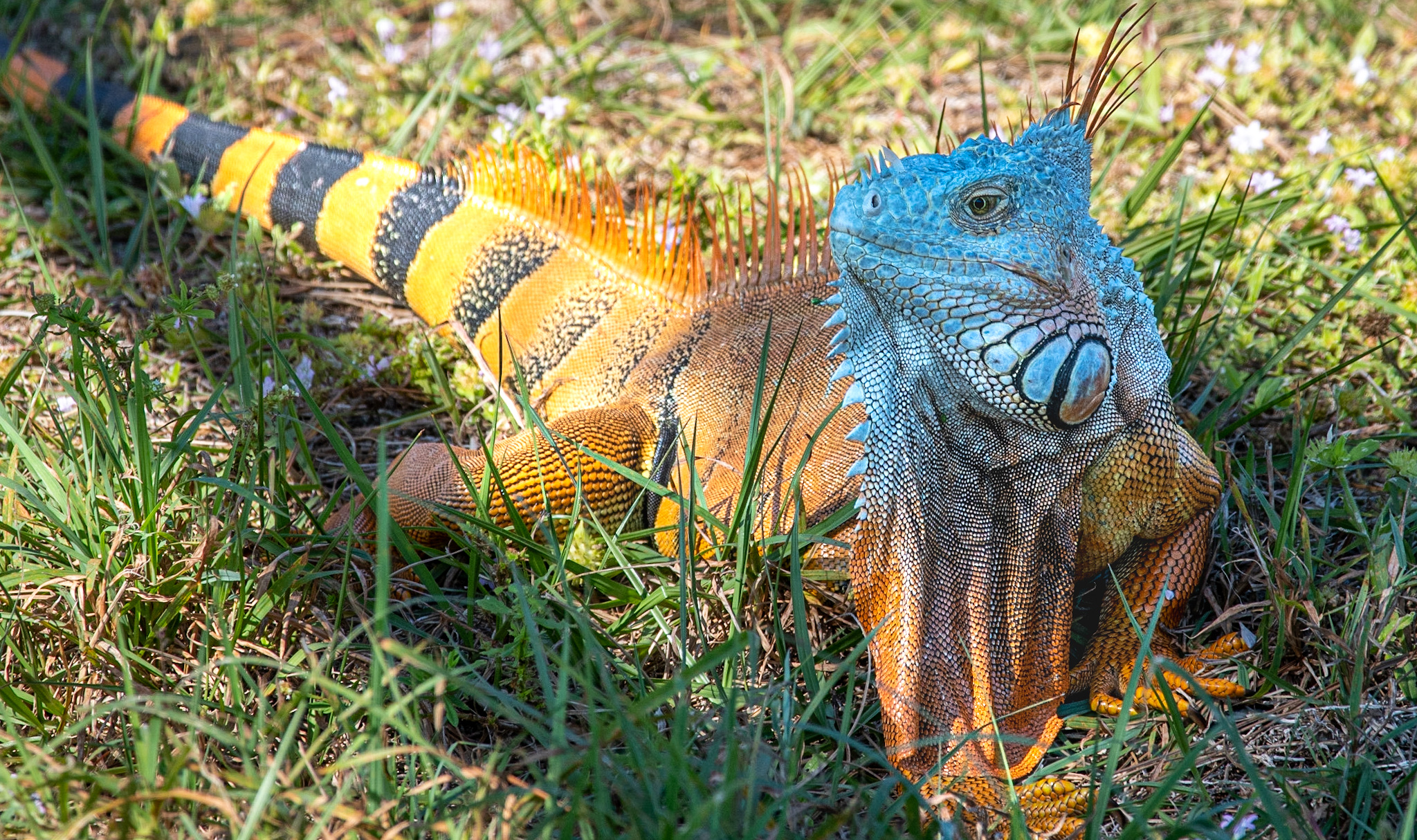
Green iguana

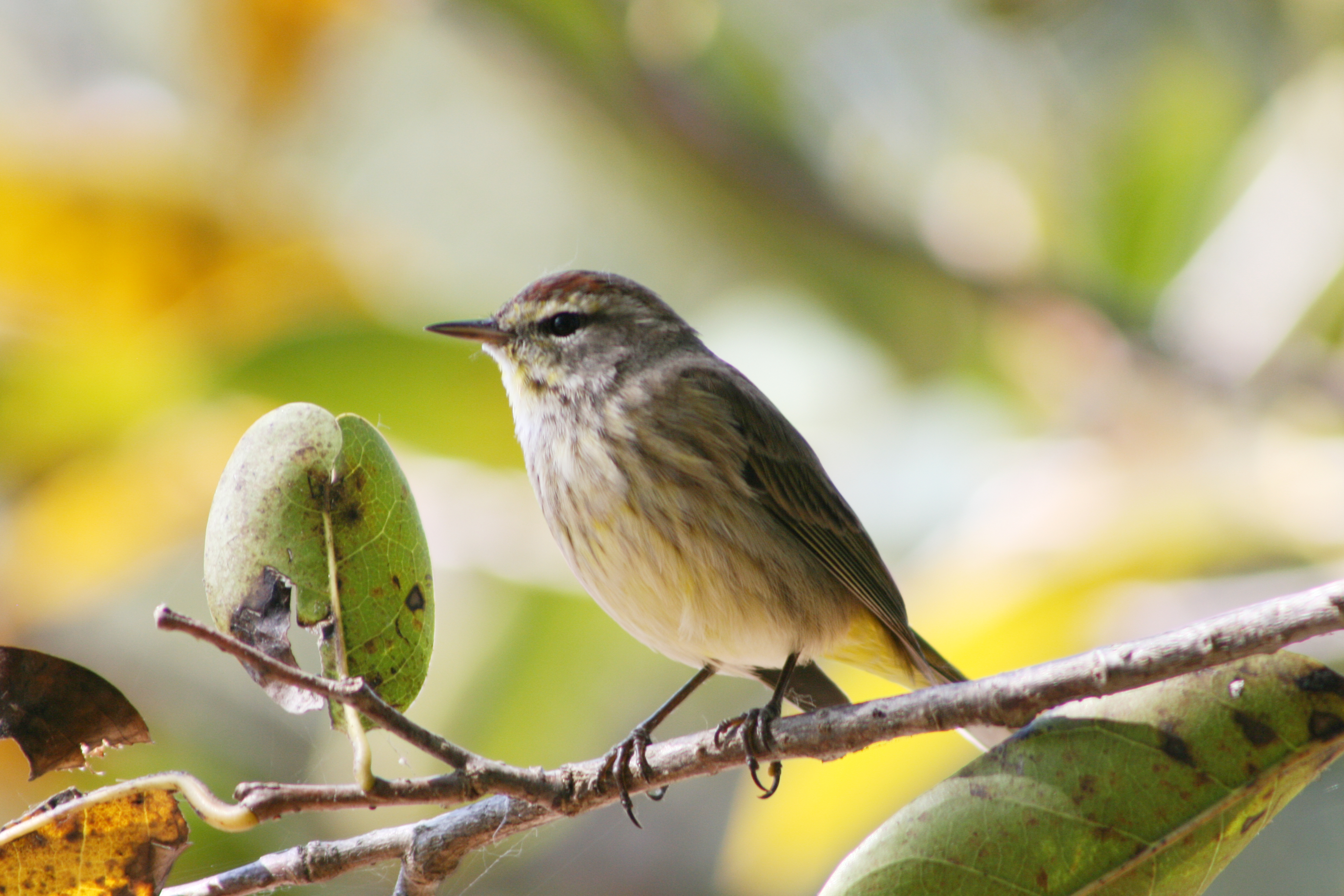
Palm warbler

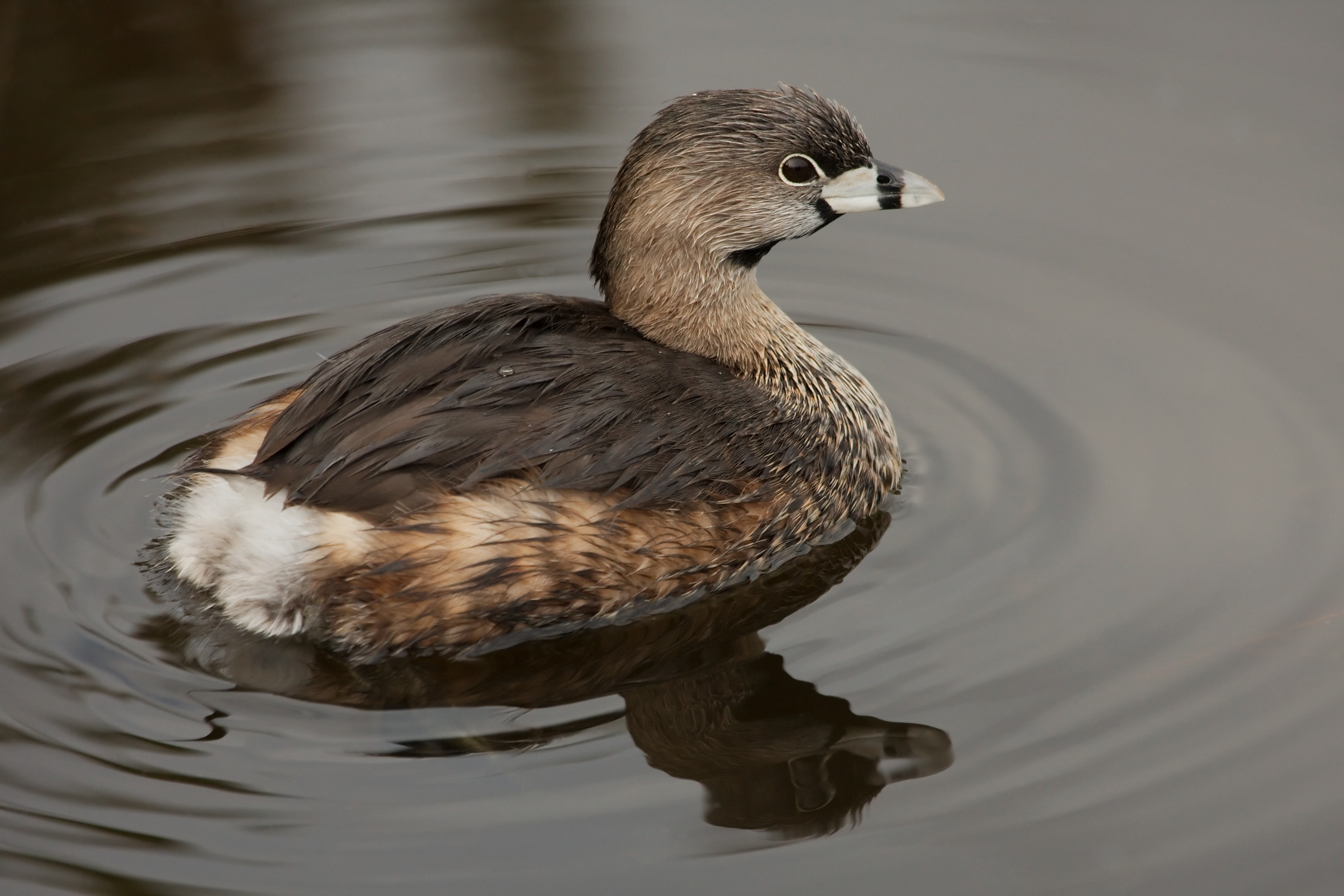
Pied-billed grebe

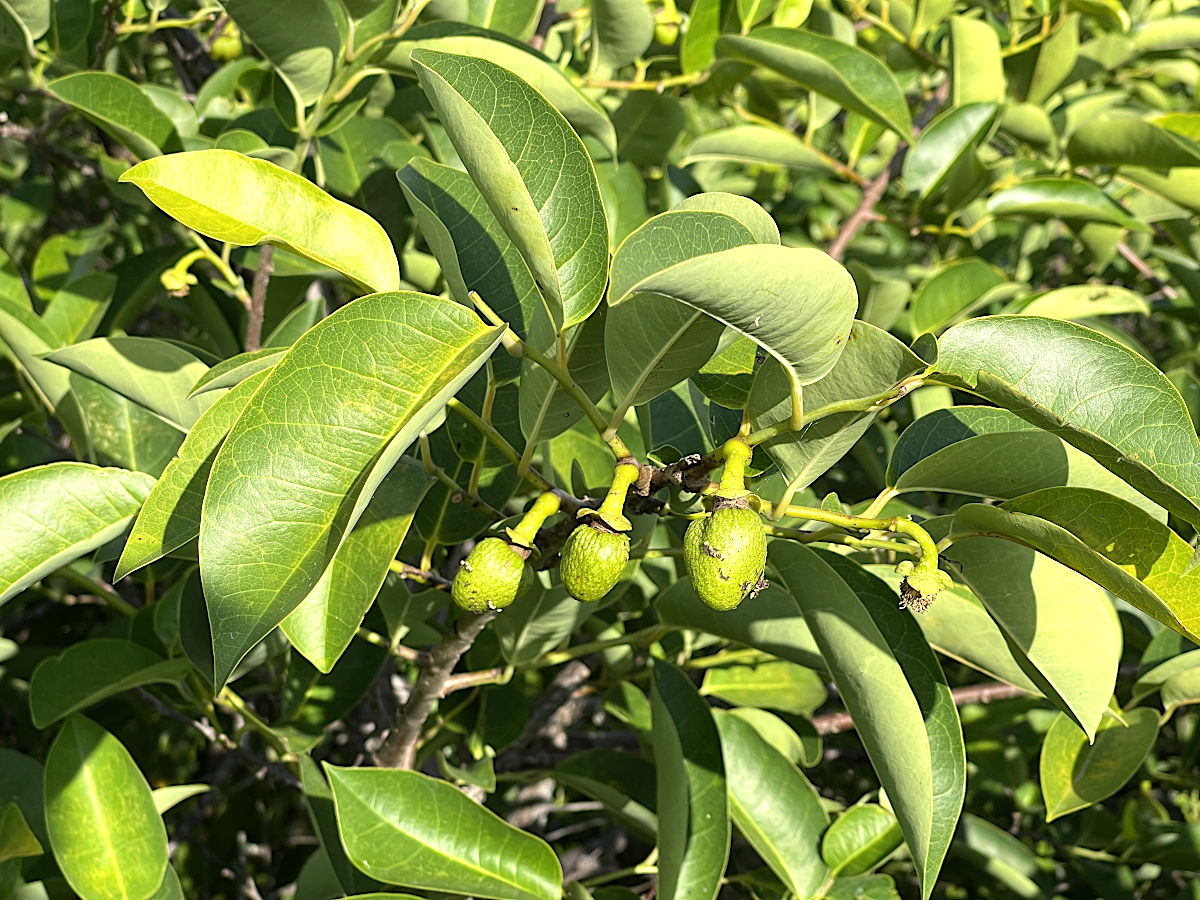
Pond apple

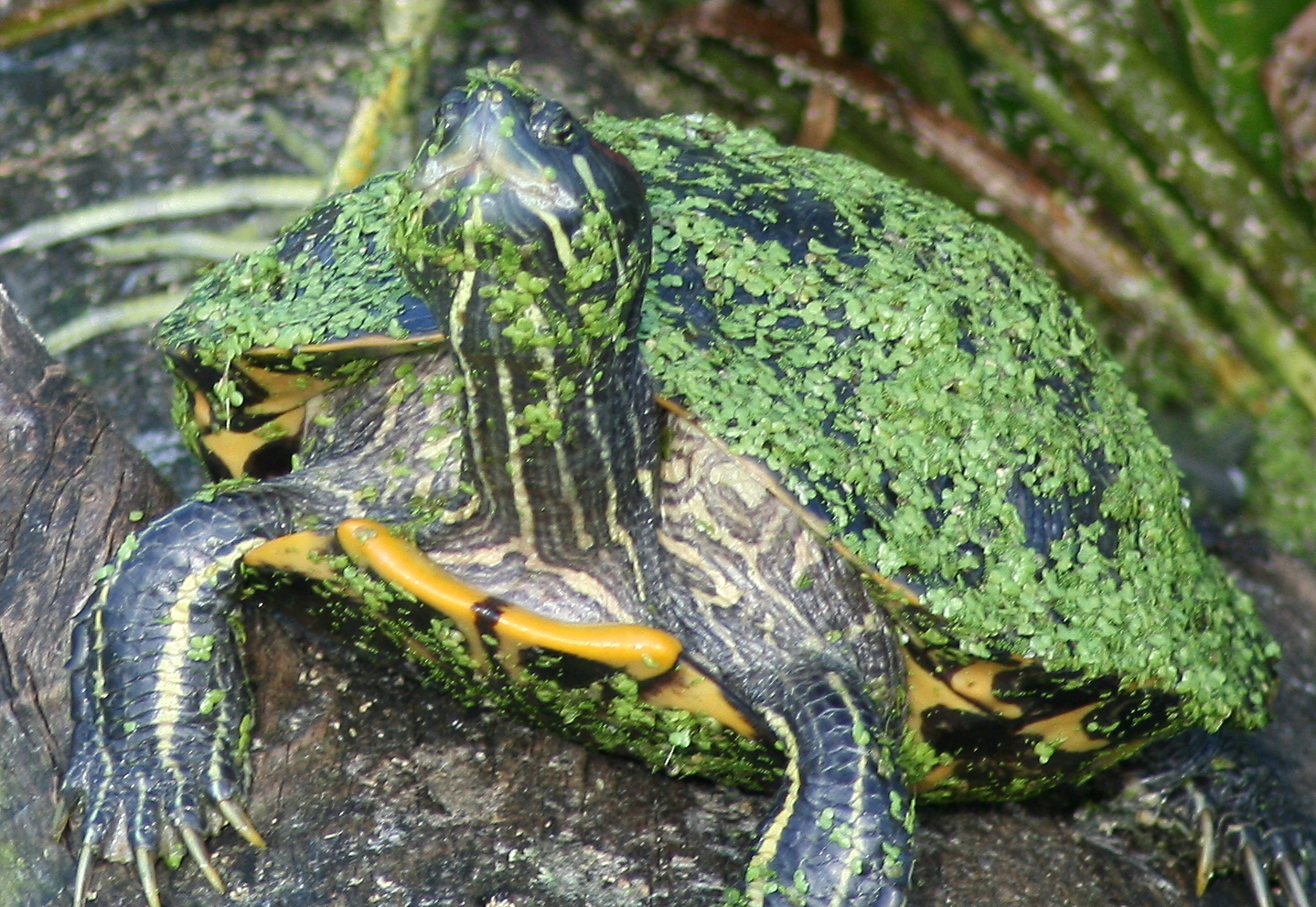
Red-eared slider

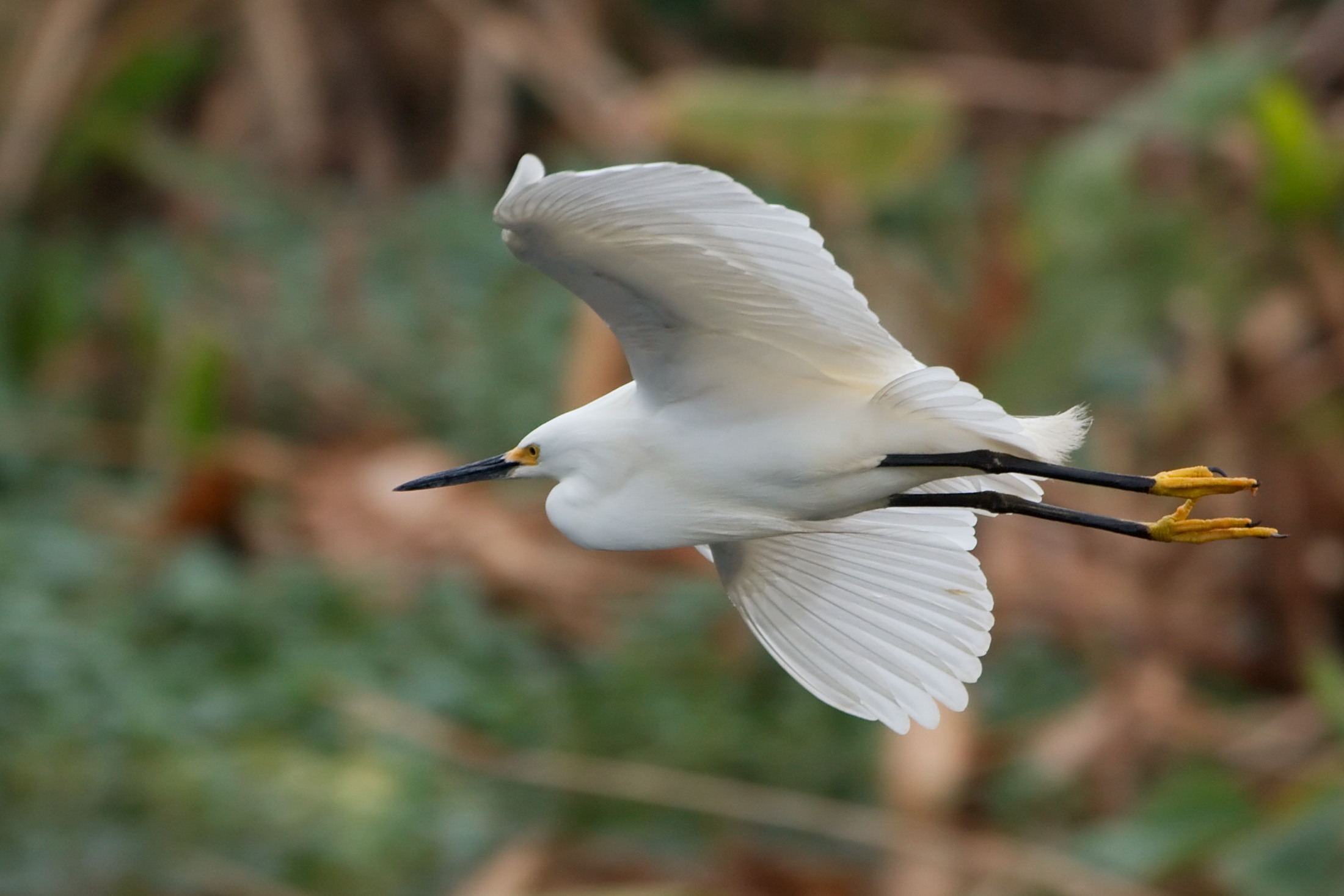
Snowy egret

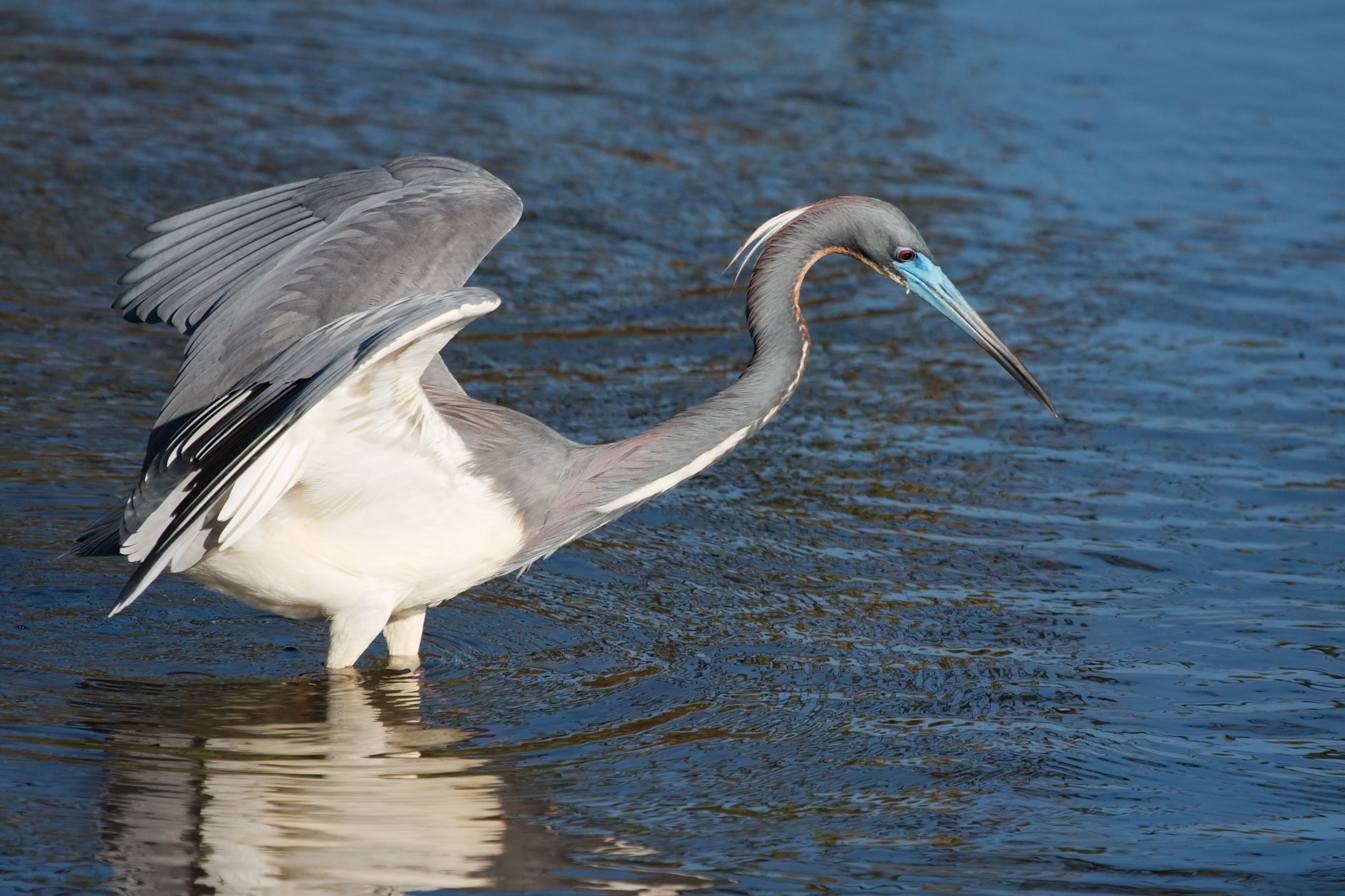
Tricolored heron

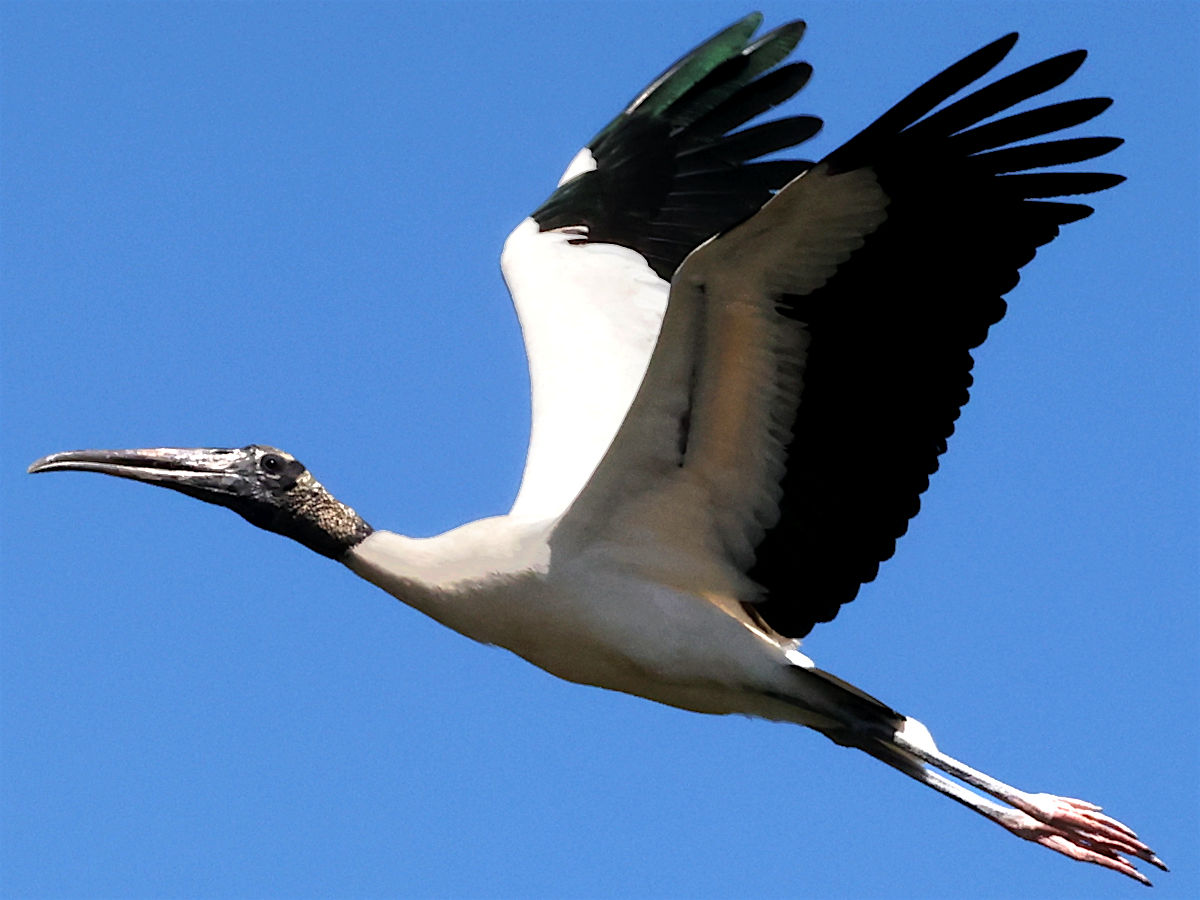
Wood stork
