= Eagle Lake Park =

Park in Largo, Florida, United States

Coordinates: 27°56′00″N 82°45′52″W

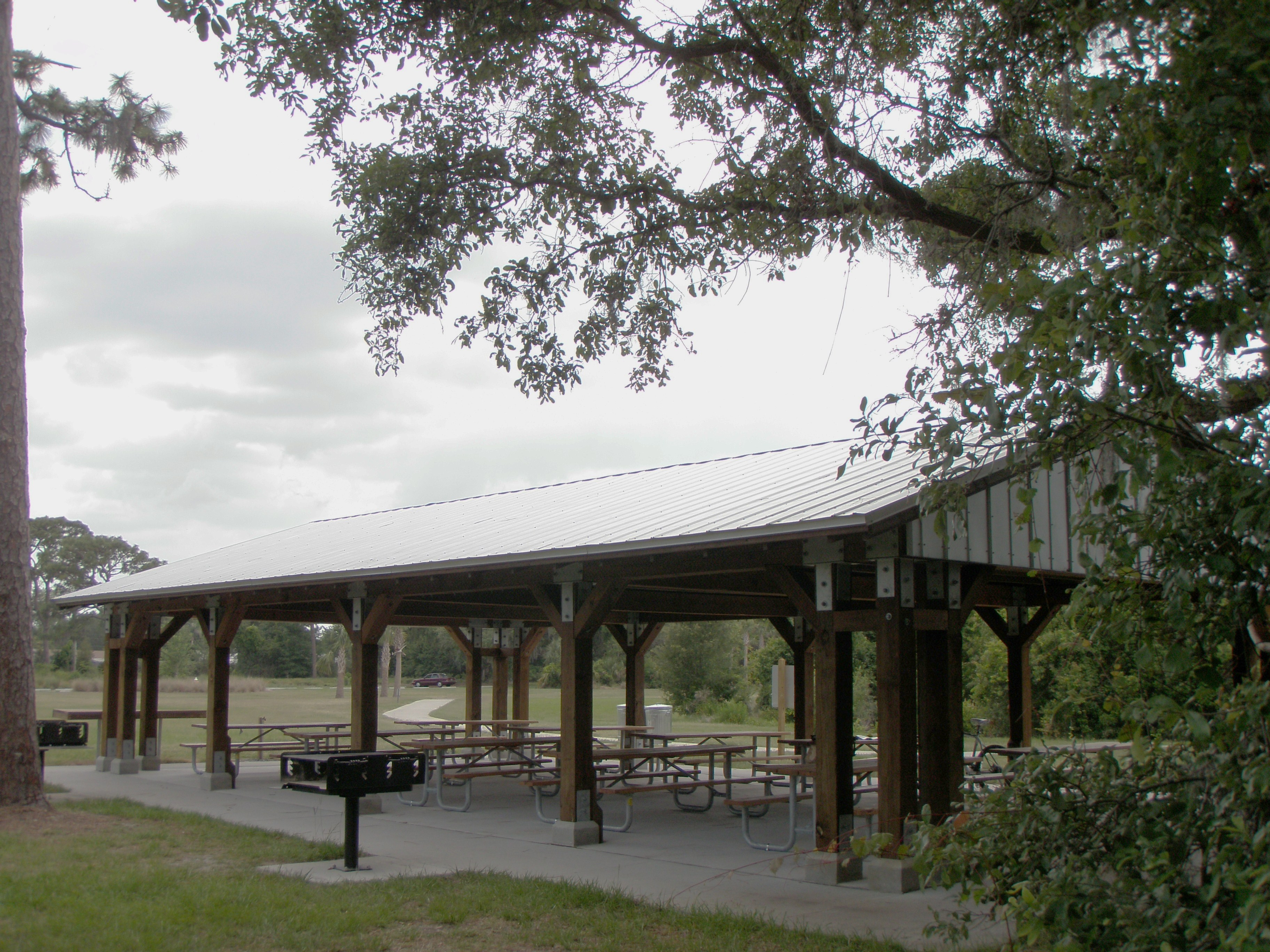
Eagle Lake Park picnic shelter

Eagle Lake Park is a county-level park located in Largo, Florida. It is a 163-acre preserve located in a suburban district, consisting of two parcels of land Pinellas County purchased in 1998 and 2006, respectively. The land originally belonged to the Taylor family, one of the peninsula's first settled American families. It was used as a pasture, and subsequently an orange grove. It has miles of hiking and walking trails, in addition to shelters, playgrounds, wildlife, and the centerpiece lake. It opened in 2010.

The park has 2,000 feet (610 m) of boardwalks over restored wetlands.
