= Matanzas Pass Preserve =

Land reserve in Lee County, Florida, U.S.

Coordinates: 26.450°N 81.936°W

Matanzas Pass Preserve is a 60-acre (24 ha) area of protected land in Lee County, Florida, located one mile south of Matanzas Pass Bridge off Estero Boulevard on Estero Island in Fort Myers Beach. The preserve has trails and a paddle craft landing. It is along the Great Calusa Blueway Paddling Trail.

Work to maintain the preserve is carried out by Friends of Matanzas Pass Preserve. The main entrance is on Bay Road behind Beach Elementary School, just beyond the Estero Island Historic Cottages.

== History ==
In 1974, Fort Myers Beach resident and nature photographer John Dunning purchased the property from Martha Redd's estate and donated 22 acres to the Nature Conservancy. The preserve was dedicated on January 20, 1979. It contains one of the last maritime oak hammocks in the area. In 1994 the Nature Conservancy donated the land to Lee County.
