= List of protected areas of Florida =

The protected areas of Florida include 158 Wildlife Management Areas and Environmental Areas. While many of these are stand-alone properties, they also include National Wildlife Refuges, Florida State Forests, and Aquatic Preserves.

== Wildlife management area ==
There are five regions for the wildlife management areas.

=== Northwest ===
- Apalachee Wildlife Management Area
- Apalachicola River Wildlife and Environmental Area
  - Apalachicola Quail Enhancement Area
  - Apalachicola Bradwell Unit
  - Apalachicola Bradwell Unit PSGHA
  - Apalachicola River
- Aucilla Wildlife Management Area spans over 55,000 acres (22,000 ha) (30.188° N, -83.9782° W).
- Blackwater River State Forest 191,148 acres (77,355 ha) with the Blackwater Wildlife Management Area, Blackwater Carr Unit, and the Blackwater Hutton Unit Wildlife Management Area.
- Box R Wildlife Management Area (BRWMA)): 12,278 acres (4,969 ha) in with an additional 6,194 acres (2,507 ha) added in 2020 for a total of 18,472 acres (7,475 ha) in Gulf and Franklin counties, Florida, along the Apalachicola and Jackson rivers.
  - Box R PSGHA
- Choctawhatchee River Wildlife Management Area.
- Econfina Creek Wildlife Management Area
  - Econfina Creek Fitzhugh Carter Area: 2,175 acres (880 ha) unit of Econfina Creek Wildlife Management Area of Econfina Creek Wildlife Management Area.
- Escambia River Wildlife Management Area: 36,521.2 acres (14,779.6 ha).
- Eglin AFB Wildlife Management Area: 14 units totaling 254,888 acres (103,150 ha).
- Escribano Point Wildlife Management Area.
- Flint Rock Wildlife Management Area: 4,119 acres (1,667 ha) (30.1632° N, -84.0551° W). Over 20,000 acres (8,100 ha).
- Joe Budd Wildlife Management Area: 11,039 acres (4,467 ha), joint management with the Florida Forest Service and the Florida Fish and Wildlife Conservation Commission.
- L. Kirk Edwards Wildlife Management Area: 1,782.65 acres (721.41 ha).
- Lafayette Creek Wildlife Management Area: 3,160 acres (1,280 ha).
- Ochlockonee River State Park: Managed as the Ochlockonee River Wildlife Management Area.
- Perdido River Wildlife Management Area: 6,261 acres (2,534 ha).
- Pine Log State Forest (PLSF). Managed as the Pine Log Wildlife Management Area (1936): Florida's first state forest with 6,911 acres (2,797 ha) in Bay and Washington counties. Joint management and agency responsibility

Florida Forest Service: General Forest Resource Management Florida Fish and Wildlife Conservation Commission: Wildlife Resources and Laws Northwest Florida Water Management District: Water Resources Department of State, Division of Historical Resources, Historical and Archaeological Resources Management.

- Point Washington State Park. Managed as the Point Washington Wildlife Management Area: 15,407 acres (6,235 ha) in Walton.
- Lake Talquin State Forest. Managed as the Talquin Wildlife Management Area: 20,577 acres (8,327 ha) in Gadsden, Leon and Liberty counties.
- Tate's Hell State Forest: 202,000 acres (82,000 ha) with 187,700 acres (76,000 ha) managed as the Tate's Hell Wildlife Management Area. and includes the nearly 14,000 acres (5,700 ha) Tate's Hell WMA - Womack Creek Unit, in Franklin and Liberty counties. Jointly managed by the Florida Fish and Wildlife Conservation Commission and the Florida Forest Service.
- Tyndall AFB Wildlife Management Area, referred to as the 3,700 acres (1,500 ha) Tyndall Critical Wildlife Area (CWA): Among other birds the CWA is a nesting spot for the state-threatened species, American oystercatcher (Haematopus palliatus), black skimmer (Rynchops niger), least tern (Sternula antillarum), and snowy plover (Anarhynchus nivosus).
- Upper Chipola River Wildlife Management Area: 8,959 acres (3,626 ha).
- Wakulla Wildlife Management Area: Over 20,000 acres (8,100 ha).
- Yellow River Wildlife Management Area:

=== North central ===
- Alligator Lake PSGHA
- Andrews Wildlife Management Area:
- Bayard Wildlife Management Area (Officially the J.P. Hall Bayard Point Conservation Area):
- Belmore State Forest: 6,500 acres (2,600 ha)
  - Belmore Wildlife Management Area: 8,700 acres (3,500 ha).
- Big Bend Wildlife Management Area: includes 90,000 acres (36,000 ha) in five individual units, Snipe Island, Hickory Mound, Spring Creek, Tide Swamp, and Jena Wildlife Management Area Units.
  - Hickory Mound unit, Big Bend Wildlife Management Area:
  - Jena Wildlife Management Area Unit:
  - Spring Creek Wildlife Management Area Unit:
  - Snipe Island Wildlife Management Area Unit (30.1098° N, -83.9704° W):
  - Tide Swamp Wildlife Management Area Unit: 22,484 acres (9,099 ha) in Taylor County.
- Blue Springs Wildlife Management Area
- Cary State Forest: Contains over 20,000 acres (8,100 ha) of land in Nassau and Duval counties.
  - Cary Wildlife Management Area: Over 11,000 acres (4,500 ha) of forested uplands and swamps.
- Cedar Key Scrub State Reserve: 6,784 acres (2,745 ha) in Levy County.
- Cedar Key Scrub Wildlife Management Area: 4,900 acres (2,000 ha), connected to the Cedar Key Scrub State Reserve.
- Citrus Wildlife Management Area: A tract of the Withlacoochee State Forest. Nearly 50,000 acres (20,000 ha) in Citrus and Hernando counties.
- Cypress Creek Wildlife Management Area: Listed as a single tract, the Indiantown Road separates the north side from the south side. The south side has 230 acres (93 ha). The north side has 1,853.1 acres (749.9 ha).
- Devil's Hammock Wildlife Management Area: There is a total of 7,774 acres (3,146 ha) in Levy County bordering the Waccasassa River and Otter Creek. 4,274 acres (1,730 ha) are owned by the Suwannee River Water Management District and 3,500 acres (1,400 ha) by Levy County.
- Flying Eagle Wildlife Management Area: The WMA has 16,305 acres (6,598 ha) in Citrus and Sumter counties, that includes the Tsala Apopka Chain of Lakes and islands. Wildlife include Eastern Meadowlarks, Eastern Bluebirds, Loggerhead Shrikes, and American Kestrels, as well as Anhinga, Purple martin, Wood duck, Northern harrier, Sandhill crane, Eastern screech-owl, Brown thrasher, Prairie warbler and LeConte's sparrow. Dade Battlefield Historic State Park, site of the Dade battle, is within 10 miles and Fort Cooper State Park is within 5 miles.
- Fort White Wildlife and Environmental Area (WEA): Initially, 1,208 acres (489 ha) was purchased from the Elizabeth Tudeen estate by the Florida Wildlife Commission (FWC) in 1997. The purchase was to prevent future losses of gopher tortoise habitat. The WEA was a joint venture between the Suwannee River Water Management District. In 2011, management of 281 acres (114 ha), known as the Santa Fe Oasis, was assigned to the FWC.
- Four Creeks State Forest, also referred to as Four Creeks Wildlife Management Area: 13,658 acres (5,527 ha) in Nassau County. The property was purchased by the St. Johns River Water Management District and Florida Forever Program’s Northeast Florida Timberlands and Watershed Reserve Project, managed by the Florida Forest Service and the Florida Fish and Wildlife Conservation Commission.
- Goethe State Forest, also referred to as the Goethe Wildlife Management Area: 53,398-acre (216 km^{2}) forest and wildlife management area managed jointly by the Florida Forest Service (See: Florida state forests), primarily in Levy County. Some of the 640 acres (260 ha) of the "Watermelon Pond Unit" are in Alachua County.
- Grove Park Wildlife Management Area: 16,437 acres (6,652 ha) in Alachua County. Owned by the Plum Creek Lumber Company and jointly managed by Florida Fish & Wildlife, St. Johns River Water Management District, and Plum Creek Lumber.
- Gulf Hammock Wildlife Management Area: 23,248 acres (9,408 ha) of protected and privately owned timberland in Levy County, in the Gulf Hammock region. Of the total of 25,611 acres (10,364 ha), 23,248 acres are managed by the Florida Fish and Wildlife Conservation Commission. The rest is managed as less-than-fee, by the owner.
- Hatchet Creek Wildlife Management Area: is a 2,760-acre tract in Alachua County, Florida within the larger Newnans Lake Conservation Area
- Hickory Mound Wildlife Management Area: See, Big Bend Wildlife Management Area
- Holton Creek Wildlife Management Area is 2,500-acre tract in Hamilton County, Florida
- Homosassa Springs Wildlife State Park: Officially: Ellie Schiller Homosassa Springs Wildlife State Park, and called the Homosassa Wildlife Management Area. A 5,000 acres (2,000 ha) tract of the Withlacoochee State Forest located in Citrus County.
- Ichetucknee Springs State Park
- Jena Wildlife Management Area: See, Big Bend Wildlife Management Area
- Jennings State Forest 23,997 acres (9,711 ha).
  - Jennings Forest Wildlife Management Area.
- Little River Conservation Area: 2,293 acres (928 ha) of "less-than-fee" private land (owner-managed) with no public access and approved by the Acquisition and Restoration Council (ARC). The land is periodically monitored by the Department of Environmental Protection’s (DEP) Division of State Lands, and the Florida Fish and Wildlife Conservation Commission.
- Lochloosa Wildlife Management Area: 10,653 acres (4,311 ha) in Alachua County, jointly managed by the Florida Fish and Wildlife Conservation Commission and the St. Johns River Water Management District (SJRWMD).
- Log Landing Wildlife Management Area covers 1,167 acres along the Suwannee River in Dixie County
- Lower Econfina Wildlife Management Area
- Lower Suwanee National Wildlife Refuge
- Mallory Swamp Wildlife Management Area
- Manatee Springs State Park:
- Middle Aucilla Wildlife Management Area
- Nassau Wildlife Management Area
- Osceola Wildlife Management Area
- Potash Corp. Wildlife Management Area
- Potts Wildlife Management Area is 4,000 acres in Citrus County (Potts Preserve)
- Raiford Wildlife Management Area
- Ralph Simmons Wildlife Management Area in Nassau County (Ralph E. Simmons Memorial State Forest)
- Santa Fe Swamp Wildlife and Environmental Area
- Rocky Glades Wildlife Management Area, also known as Rocky Glades Public Small Game Hunting Area (PSGHA): 10,913 acres (4,416 ha) in Miami-Dade County.
- Snipe Island Wildlife Management Area: See Big Bend Wildlife Management Area
- Spring Creek Wildlife Management Area: See Big Bend Wildlife Management Area
- Steinhatchee Springs Wildlife Management Area
- Steinhatchee Springs PSGHA
- Suwannee Ridge Wildlife Management Area (Suwannee Ridge Wildlife and Environmental Area) in Hamilton County
- Thomas Creek Wildlife Management Area covers 2,000 acres in Duval County, Florida
- Tide Swamp Wildlife Management Area: See, Big Bend Wildlife Management Area
- Troy Springs Wildlife Management Area in Lafayette County (see also Troy Springs State Park)
- Twin Rivers Wildlife Management Area about 9,000 acres in Madison, Hamilton and Suwannee counties
- Yellow Jacket Conservation Area: 715.3 acres (289.5 ha) in Old Town across the Suwannee River from Manatee Springs State Park.

=== Northeast ===
- Buck Lake Wildlife Management Area (Buck Lake Conservation Area): More than 9,000 acres (3,600 ha) in Volusia and Brevard counties.
- Herky Huffman/Bull Creek Wildlife Management Area: 23,646 acres (9,569 ha) and includes rare plants like the Large-flowered rosemary or Largeflower false rosemary (Conradina grandiflora), Nodding pinweed (Lechea cernua), cutthroat grass (Coleataenia abscissa), plume polypody. (Pecluma plumula) and giant orchid (Eulophia ecristata).
- Caravelle Ranch Wildlife Management Area (CRWMA): Located in Putnam and Marion counties. The 12,397 acres (5,017 ha) WMA is situated between the Ocklawaha and St. Johns rivers. Wildlife can include Bachman's sparrows. Other sparrows winter in the WMA and include Chipping sparrows, Field sparrows, Henslow sparrows, Savannah sparrows, Swamp sparrows, and Song sparrows. Winter ducks include the Hooded Merganser and from March to August the Swallow-tailed Kites. There are 11.7 miles (18.8 km) of trails in the WMA.
- Dunns Creek Wildlife Management Area: 3,000 acres (1,200 ha) in eastern Putnam County. Wildlife include bobcats, raccoons, white-tailed deer, and gray foxes. Both migratory and resident birds are found in the area, which includes wood ducks, swallow-tailed kites, red-shouldered hawk, barred owls, yellow-crowned night herons, woodpeckers, and warblers. Dunns Creek runs between the WMA and Dunns Creek State Park.
- Emeralda Marsh Wildlife Management Area (PSGHA)
- Etoniah Creek Wildlife Management Area
- Fort Drum Wildlife Management Area
- Fort McCoy Wildlife Management Area
- Gores Landing Wildlife Management Area
- Guana River Wildlife Management Area
- Half Moon Wildlife Management Area
- Jumper Creek Wildlife Management Area: 10,000 acres (4,000 ha) of protected land within the Withlacoochee State Forest.
- Kilbee Unit Wildlife Management Area
- Kissimmee Chain of Lakes Wildlife Management Area
- Lake George Wildlife Management Area
    - Dexter/Mary Farms Unit
- Lake Monroe Wildlife Management Area
- Lake Panasoffkee Wildlife Management Area
- Lake Tracy Unit Wildlife Management Area
- Lake Woodruff National Wildlife Refuge (NWR)
- Marshall Swamp Wildlife Management Area (PSGHA)
- Matanzas Wildlife Management Area
- Merritt Island National Wildlife Refuge (NWR)
- Ocala Wildlife Management Area
- Ocklawaha Prairie Wildlife Management Area (PSGHA)
- Orange Creek Wildlife Management Area (PSGHA)
- Prairie Lakes Wildlife Management Area (PSGHA)
- Relay Wildlife Management Area
- Richloam Wildlife Management Area: One of the seven tracts of the Withlacoochee State Forest. 58,000 acres (23,000 ha) of protected land in Hernando, Pasco, Sumter, and Lake Counties.
  - Baird Unit: More than 11,000 acres (4,500 ha), and one of the seven tracts of the Withlacoochee State Forest.
- Rock Springs Run Wildlife Management Area
- Ross Prairie Wildlife Management Area
- Salt Lake Wildlife Management Area
- Seminole State Forest
- Seminole Ranch Wildlife Management Area
- Split Oak Forest Wildlife and Environmental Area
- T.M. Goodwin Wildlife Management Area
- Three Lakes Wildlife Management Area
- Tiger Bay Wildlife Management Area
  - Rima Ridge Unit Wildlife Management Area
- Tosohatchee Wildlife Management Area
- Triple N Wildlife Management Area
- Twelve Mile Swamp Conservation Area
- Upper St. Johns River Marsh Wildlife Management Area

=== Southwest ===
- Arbuckle
- Avon Park AFR
- Babcock Ranch Preserve.
  - Fred C. Babcock/Cecil M. Webb Wildlife Management Area
- Chassahowitzka Wildlife Management Area
- Croom Wildlife Management Area. A 50,000 acres (20,000 ha) tract of the Withlacoochee State Forest in Citrus and Hernando counties.
- Green Swamp (Florida)
- Green Swamp West
- Hickory Hammock Wildlife Management Area (3,500 acres (1,400 ha) in Lake County.
- Hilochee Wildlife Management Area (9,756.6 acres (3,948.4 ha)) includes the Osprey Unit
- KICCO Wildlife Management Area includes the Public Small Game Hunting Area (PSGHA)
- Kissimmee Prairie Preserve State Park
  - Kissimmee River Public Use Area (P.U.A).
- Lake Marion Creek Wildlife Management Area (8,000 acres (3,200 ha))
- Myakka State Forest (includes: PSGHA)
- Perry Oldenburg Wildlife and Environmental Area
- Upper Hillsborough Wildlife Management Area (6,978 acres (2,824 ha)).
- Walk-in-the-Water Wildlife Management Area. 6,000 acres (2,400 ha) in Polk County.
- Weeki Wachee Springs (Officially: Weeki Wachee Springs State Park): Home of the Mermaids of Weeki Wachee. The park is a tourist attraction but the Weeki Wachee River has been designated a Springs Protection Zone into the park.
- Weekiwachee Preserve: 11,206 acres (4,535 ha) of wildlife preserve.
- Weekiwachee Wildlife Management Area: 2,800 acres (1,100 ha) located on the northern end of the Weekiwachee Preserve.
- Withlacoochee State Forest: The Perry Oldenburg WMA is to the west, Croom WMA borders the south, and Richloam Wildlife Management Area is to the east along the Withlacoochee River.
- Yucca Pens Preserve (14,433.5 acres (5,841.0 ha) Yucca Pens Unit State Wildlife Management Area), Lee County in Cape Coral.

=== South ===
- Allapatah Flats Wildlife Management Area. Just over 21,000 acres (8,500 ha) in Martin County.
- Atlantic Ridge Preserve State Park: 4,886 acres (1,977 ha) in Martin County. Birding wildlife includes Herons, egrets, Florida sandhill cranes, wood storks, Red-shouldered hawk, and Bald eagles.
- Big Cypress National Preserve: The first national preserve in the United States, at 729,000 acres (295,000 ha), the preserve is home to the Florida bonneted bat (Eumops floridanus), the Mangrove or Big cypress fox squirrel (Sciurus niger avicennia), and the Florida Pineland or Everglades crabgrass. The preserve is managed as the Big Cypress Wildlife Management Area.
- C 23-24 Reservoir Public Small Game Hunting Area (PSGHA):
- Corkscrew Regional Ecosystem Watershed (CREW) Wildlife Management Area: More than 28,000 acres (11,000 ha) in Lee and Collier counties. The CREW Wildlife and Environmental Area covers more than 28,000 acres (11,000 ha) of the 60,000 acres (24,000 ha)+ of the land acquisition project.
- Dinner Island Wildlife Management Area: 21,707 acres (8,785 ha) in Hendry County. Wildlife includes winter sparrows (Spizelloides arborea), Loggerhead Shrikes (Lanius ludovicianus), Short-tailed Hawk (Buteo brachyurus), Purple Gallinule (Porphyrio martinica), and Painted Bunting (Passerina ciris), Burrowing Owls, Sandhill Cranes, Wild turkeys, Crested Caracara, sometimes Snail Kites. Both the Black-bellied and Fulvous whistling ducks, as well as Wood storks and Roseate spoonbills.
- DuPuis Management Area
  - DuPuis Dove Field PSGHA
- J.W. Corbett Wildlife Management Area: 60,497 acres (24,482 ha) in Palm Beach County. Connected to the DuPuis Management Area)
- Everglades
- Fisheating Creek Wildlife Management Area: 12,382 acres (5,011 ha) of protected area, predominantly along Fisheating Creek (26.9209° N, -81.4073° W) in Glades County. Fort Center is within the WMA.
- Holey Land Wildlife Management Area: Is 35,000 acres (14,000 ha) of protected area. The WMA is considered part of the Everglades complex of Wildlife Management Areas within the South Florida Water Management District. Although separate, the WMA is also listed as the 65,000 acres (26,000 ha) Holey Land/Rotenberger Wildlife Management Areas in Palm Beach and Broward counties. The WMA borders the Rotenberger Wildlife Management Area to the west and the Stormwater Treatment Area (STA) 3 and 4 Waterfowl Public Small Game Hunting Area to the east.
- Hungryland Wildlife Management Area: Officially the John C. and Mariana Jones/Hungryland Wildlife and Environmental Area. 16,600 acres (6,700 ha) in Palm Beach and Martin counties. The WMA was renamed in honor of Johnny and Marianna Jones, who were instrumental in the creation of this environmental area and over three million acres of public lands.
- Okaloacoochee Slough Wildlife Management Area: 58,880 acres (23,830 ha) in Hendry and Collier managed jointly by the Florida Department of Agriculture and Consumer Services, Florida Forest Service, and the Florida Fish and Wildlife Conservation Commission. Spirit-of-the-Wild Wildlife Management Area borders the northwest section of the WMA, separated by Keri Road.
- Picayune Strand Wildlife Management Area: 74,008 acres (29,950 ha) in Collier County.
- Rocky Glades Wildlife Management Area (PSGHA)
- Rotenberger Wildlife Management Area
- Southern Glades Wildlife Management Area
- Spirit-of-the-Wild Wildlife Management Area
- STA 1 West Wildlife Management Area (PSGHA)
- STA 3-4 PSGHA
- STA 5 PSGHA

==== Wildlife and Environmental Area ====
- John C. and Mariana Jones/Hungryland Wildlife and Environmental Area
- Lake Wales Ridge Wildlife and Environmental Area. Includes the Royce Unit, trails, and Public Small Game Hunting Area (PSGHA).

== National wildlife refuges ==
- Archie Carr National Wildlife Refuge
- Arthur R. Marshall Loxahatchee National Wildlife Refuge, also known as the Loxahatchee National Wildlife Refuge, covers 145,000 acres (59,000 ha)
- Caloosahatchee National Wildlife Refuge
- Cedar Keys National Wildlife Refuge
- Chassahowitzka National Wildlife Refuge
- Crocodile Lake National Wildlife Refuge
- Crystal River National Wildlife Refuge
- Egmont Key National Wildlife Refuge
- Everglades Headwaters National Wildlife Refuge and Conservation Area
- Florida Panther National Wildlife Refuge
- Great White Heron National Wildlife Refuge
- Hobe Sound National Wildlife Refuge
- Island Bay National Wildlife Refuge
- J. N. "Ding" Darling National Wildlife Refuge
- Key Deer National Wildlife Refuge
- Key West National Wildlife Refuge
- Lake Wales Ridge National Wildlife Refuge
- Lake Woodruff National Wildlife Refuge
- Lower Suwannee National Wildlife Refuge
- Matlacha Pass National Wildlife Refuge
- Merritt Island National Wildlife Refuge
- Passage Key National Wildlife Refuge
- Pelican Island National Wildlife Refuge
- Pine Island National Wildlife Refuge
- Pinellas National Wildlife Refuge
- St. Johns National Wildlife Refuge
- St. Marks National Wildlife Refuge on St. Marks Island
- St. Vincent National Wildlife Refuge on St. Vincent Island
- Ten Thousand Islands National Wildlife Refuge: Ten Thousand Islands

== Aquatic preserves ==
There are 43 areas of submerged lands, listed as designated preserves, totalling over 2.9 million acres.

- Apalachicola Bay Aquatic Preserve
- Banana River Aquatic Preserve
- Big Bend Seagrasses Aquatic Preserve
- Biscayne Bay Aquatic Preserve
- Boca Ciega Bay Aquatic Preserve
- Cape Florida Aquatic Preserve
- Cape Haze Aquatic Preserve
- Cape Romano-Ten Thousand Islands Aquatic Preserve
- Cockroach Bay Aquatic Preserve
- Coupon Bight Aquatic Preserve
- Estero Bay Aquatic Preserve
- Fort Clinch Aquatic Preserve
- Fort Pickens Aquatic Preserve
- Gasparilla Sound-Charlotte Harbor Aquatic Preserve
- Guana River Marsh Aquatic Preserve
- Harbor Aquatic Preserve: Located at the extreme tip of St. James Island the 14,184 acres (5,740 ha) preserve is a protected area. The preserve is south of the Apalachicola National Forest, the 202,000 acres (82,000 ha) Tate's Hell State Forest and Bald Point State Park, past the community of Alligator Point on Peninsula Point.
- Indian River-Malabar to Vero Beach Aquatic Preserve
- Indian River-Vero Beach to Fort Pierce Aquatic Preserve
- Jensen Beach to Jupiter Inlet Aquatic Preserve
- Kristin Jacobs Coral Aquatic Preserve
- Lake Jackson Aquatic Preserve
- Lemon Bay Aquatic Preserve
- Lignumvitae Key Aquatic Preserve
- Loxahatchee River-Lake Worth Creek Aquatic Preserve
- Matlacha Pass Aquatic Preserve
- Mosquito Lagoon Aquatic Preserve
- Nassau River-St. Johns River Marshes Aquatic Preserve
- Nature Coast Aquatic Preserve
- North Fork, St. Lucie Aquatic Preserve
- Oklawaha River Aquatic Preserve
- Pellicer Creek Aquatic Preserve
- Pine Island Sound Aquatic Preserve
- Pinellas County Aquatic Preserve
- Rainbow Springs Aquatic Preserve
- Rocky Bayou Aquatic Preserve
- Rookery Bay Aquatic Preserve
- St. Andrews Aquatic Preserve
- St. Joseph Bay Aquatic Preserve
- St. Martins Marsh Aquatic Preserve
- Terra Ceia Aquatic Preserve
- Tomoka Marsh Aquatic Preserve
- Wekiva River Aquatic Preserve
- Yellow River Marsh Aquatic Preserve (see also Yellow River Marsh State Park and Yellow River (Pensacola Bay))

== See also ==
- Florida state forests
- List of Florida state parks
