= Florida Fish and Wildlife Conservation Commission =

Agency of the state government of Florida, United States

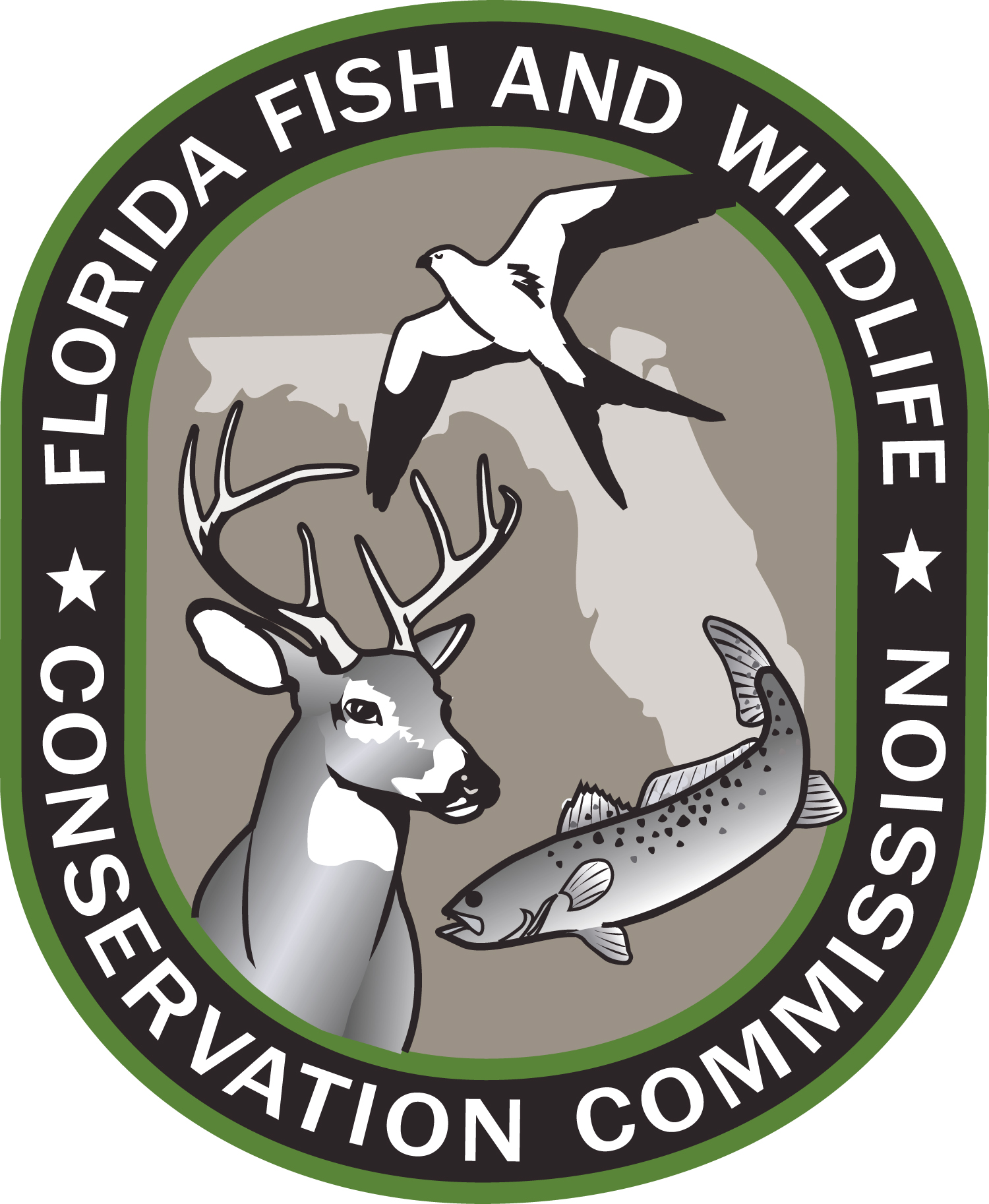
- Common name: Fish and Wildlife Conservation Commission
- Abbreviation: FWC

Agency overview
- Formed: July 1, 1999
- Preceding agencies: Marine Fisheries Commission; Game and Fresh Water Fish Commission
- Employees: 2,112.5 full-time

Jurisdictional structure
- Operations jurisdiction: Florida, United States
- Area: 170,304 km^{2}
- Population: 21,000,000+
- Governing body: Florida Legislature
- Constituting instrument: Constitution of the State of Florida
- General nature: Civilian police

Operational structure
- Headquarters: Tallahassee, Florida
- Law enforcement officers: 853 (2018)
- Agency executive: Rodney Barreto, Chairman

Website
- myfwc.com

The Florida Fish and Wildlife Conservation Commission (FWC) is a Florida government agency founded in 1999 and headquartered in Tallahassee. It manages and regulates the state's fish and wildlife resources, and enforces related laws. Officers are managers, researchers, and support personnel, and perform law enforcement in the course of their duties.

== History ==
In 1998, an amendment to the Florida Constitution approved the establishment of the FWC with a headquarters in Tallahassee, the state capital, on July 1, 1999. It resulted from a merger between three former offices, namely the Marine Fisheries Commission, Division of Marine Resources, the former Florida Marine Patrol, and the Division of Law Enforcement of the Florida Department of Environmental Protection, and all of the employees and commissioners of the former Florida Game and Freshwater Fish Commission.

The Florida Department of Environmental Protection since then serves as the environmental regulatory agency for the state, enforcing environmental legislation regarding air and water quality, for example.

In 2004, the Florida Legislature approved to integrate parts of the Division of Wildlife, Division of Freshwater Fisheries, and the Florida Marine Research Institute to create the Fish and Wildlife Research Institute (FWRI) in St. Petersburg, Florida. It has over 600 employees.

As of 2014, the FWC had over 2,000 full-time employees, and maintained the FWRI, five regional offices, and 73 field offices across the state.

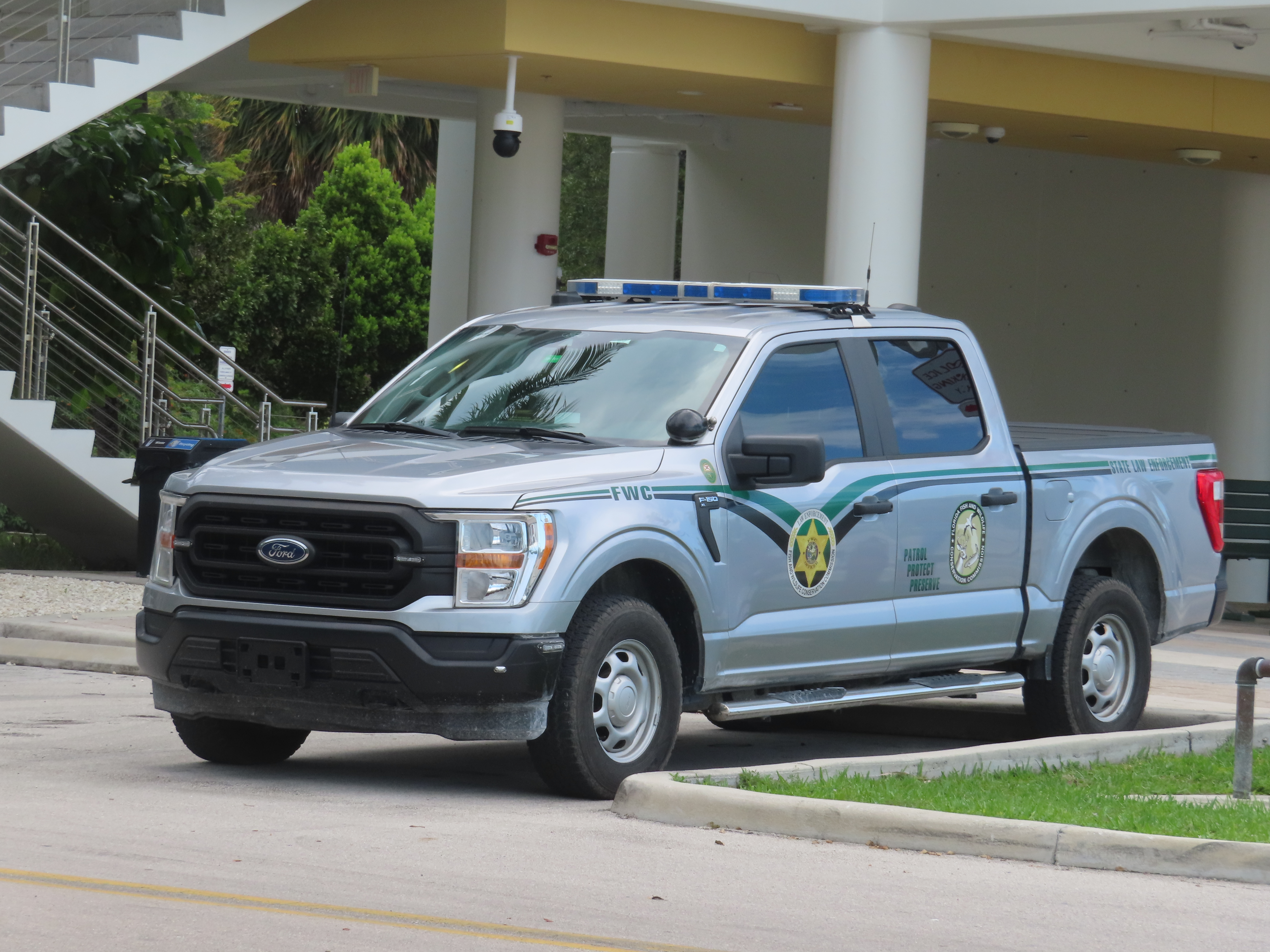
A FWC Ford F-150

== Organizational units ==
As of 2013, the FWC had six divisions:

- Fish and Wildlife Research Institute
- Division of Hunting and Game Management
- Division of Habitat and Species Conservation
- Division of Freshwater Fisheries Management
- Division of Marine Fisheries Management, which oversees the state's artificial reef program
- Division of Law Enforcement

The FWC has 11 offices for administrative purposes:

- Office of the Executive Director
- Office of Information Technology
- Office of Conservation Planning Services
- Office of Community Relations
- Office of Public Access and Wildlife Viewing Services
- Office of Policy and Accountability
- Office of Finance and Budget
- Office of Human Resources
- Office of the Inspector General
- Office of Licensing and Permitting
- Legal Office
- Legislative Affairs Office

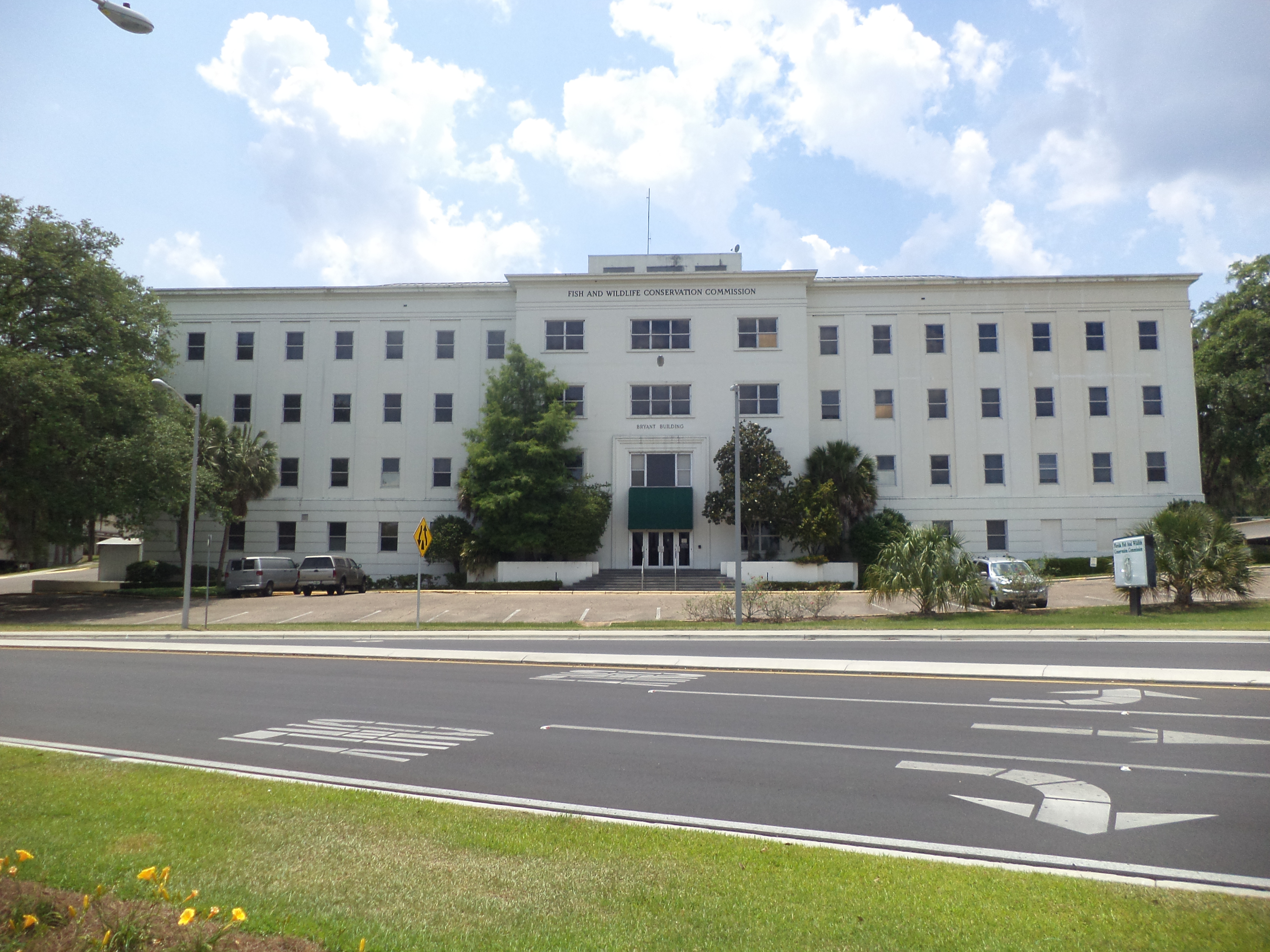
The Florida Fish and Wildlife Conservation Commission building in Tallahassee

== Commissioners ==
The Florida Constitution authorizes the commission to enact rules and regulations regarding the state's fish and wildlife resources for their long-term well-being and the benefit of people. To do this, the seven Governor of Florida-appointed commissioners meet five times each year to hear staff reports, consider rule proposals, and conduct other business. Because stakeholder involvement is a crucial part of the process, the commission meets in different locations across the state, giving citizens the opportunity to address the commission about issues under consideration.

The seven commissioners of the FWC are appointed by the governor and confirmed by the Florida legislature for five-year terms. Typically, commissioners come from different geographical areas of the state to ensure that the FWC adequately protects the entire state of Florida, but multiple commissioners from the same city or region are not unusual. Their constitutional duty is to exercise the "...regulatory and executive powers of the state with respect to wild animal life and freshwater aquatic life and shall also exercise regulatory and executive powers of the state with respect to marine life, except that all license fees and penalties for violating regulations shall be as provided by law." The Commissioners as of 2025:

Member	Current term	Began original appointment	Term expires
Rodney Barreto, Chairman	July 19, 2019	July 19, 2019	January 9, 2029
Steven Hudson, Vice Chairman	August 2, 2022	July 19, 2019	August 1, 2027
Preston Farrior	March 17, 2023	March 17, 2023	January 5, 2028
Joshua Kellam	August 11, 2025	February 2, 2018	August 1, 2027
Gary Lester	August 2, 2022	January 12, 2018	August 1, 2027
Albert Maury	April 14, 2022	April 14, 2022	August 1, 2026
Sonya Rood	May 20, 2022	December 1, 2017	January 6, 2027

== Bear management ==
In 2012, the FWC adopted a plan on how the Florida black bear should be managed over the next 10 years. It created bear management units based on seven geographically distinct bear subpopulations. In June 2015, the FWC approved "a limited bear hunt to take place beginning October 24, 2015, in four of the seven bear management units".

== Wildlife management areas ==
Wildlife management areas (WMAs) conserve nearly 6 million acres of Florida's natural habitat. The WMAs exist to protect fish and wildlife resources, and provide recreational opportunities such as hunting and wildlife-viewing.

The first wildlife management area, Fred C. Babcock/Cecil M. Webb WMA, was established in 1941 with Pittman-Robertson Act funds. Since that time, 45 lead properties (see below) have been added to this system. FWC also manages a number of other cooperative properties in conjunction with other agencies.

In 2017, the 75th anniversary of the WMA system was noted. Events were held statewide and included a kickoff event on January 21, 2017, at Fred C. Babcock/Cecil M. Webb WMA, several bioblitzes, and a final event at Tosohatchee WMA on December 2, 2017. #WMAzing was the tag created for the event and is still in use today.

== Properties ==
- Andrews Wildlife Management Area
- Apalachee Wildlife Management Area
- Apalachicola River Wildlife and Environmental Area
- Aucilla Wildlife Management Area
- Bell Ridge Longleaf Wildlife and Environmental Area
- Big Bend Wildlife Management Area
- Box-R Wildlife Management Area
- Branan Field Wildlife and Environmental Area
- Caravelle Ranch Wildlife Management Area
- Chassahowitzka Wildlife Management Area
- Chinsegut Wildlife and Environmental Area
- Crooked Lake Wildlife and Environmental Area
- Dinner Island Ranch Wildlife Management Area
- DuPuis Management Area
- Escribano Point Wildlife Management Area
- Everglades and Francis S. Taylor Wildlife Management Area
- Fisheating Creek Wildlife Management Area
- Florida Keys Wildlife and Environmental Area
- Fort White Wildlife and Environmental Area
- Fred C. Babcock/ Cecil M. Webb Wildlife Management Area
- Guana River Wildlife Management Area
- Half Moon Wildlife Management Area
- Hatchet Creek Wildlife Management Area
- Herky Huffman/Bull Creek Wildlife Management Area
- Hickey's Creek Wildlife and Environmental Area
- Hilochee Wildlife Management Area
- Holey Land Wildlife Management Area
- J.W. Corbett Wildlife Management Area
- Joe Budd Wildlife Management Area
- John C. and Mariana Jones/Hungryland Wildlife and Environmental Area
- L. Kirk Edwards Wildlife and Environmental Area
- Lafayette Forest Wildlife and Environmental Area
- Lake George Wildlife Management Area
- Lake Wales Ridge Wildlife and Environmental Area
- Little Gator Creek Wildlife and Environmental Area
- Moody Branch Wildlife and Environmental Area
- Ocala Wildlife Management Area
- Okaloacoochee Slough Wildlife Management Area
- Perry Oldenburg Wildlife and Environmental Area
- Platt Branch Wildlife and Environmental Area
- Richloam Wildlife Management Area
- Rotenberger Wildlife Management Area
- Salt Lake Wildlife Management Area
- Spirit-of-the-Wild Wildlife Management Area
- Split Oak Forest Wildlife and Environmental Area
- Suwannee Ridge Wildlife and Environmental Area
- T.M. Goodwin Wildlife Management Area
- Tenoroc Fish Management Area
- Three Lakes Wildlife Management Area
- Tomoka Wildlife Management Area Union-Camp Tract
- Tosohatchee Wildlife Management Area
- Triple N Ranch Wildlife Management Area
- Watermelon Pond Wildlife and Environmental Area

== Line of duty deaths ==
According to ODMP, the FWC and its predecessors have lost 24 officers and 1 K9 in the line of duty.

== See also ==
- List of law enforcement agencies in Florida
- Florida state forests
- Florida state parks
- Florida Wildlife Corridor
- Florida water management districts
- List of state and territorial fish and wildlife management agencies in the United States
