= Dinner Island Ranch Wildlife Management Area =

Wildlife management area in Florida

Coordinates: 26°28′46″N 81°10′28″W

U.S. Geological Survey 2018 map of Dinner Island

Dinner Island Ranch Wildlife Management Area (WMA) is a public property of more than 21,000 acres (8,500 ha) in Hendry County, Florida. Wildlife viewing, camping, hiking, off-road cycling, horseback riding trails, fishing, and hunting are offered. The trails and unpaved roads are also used for viewing wildflower, butterfly, bird, and other wildlife. It is part of the Great Florida Birding and Wildlife Trail.

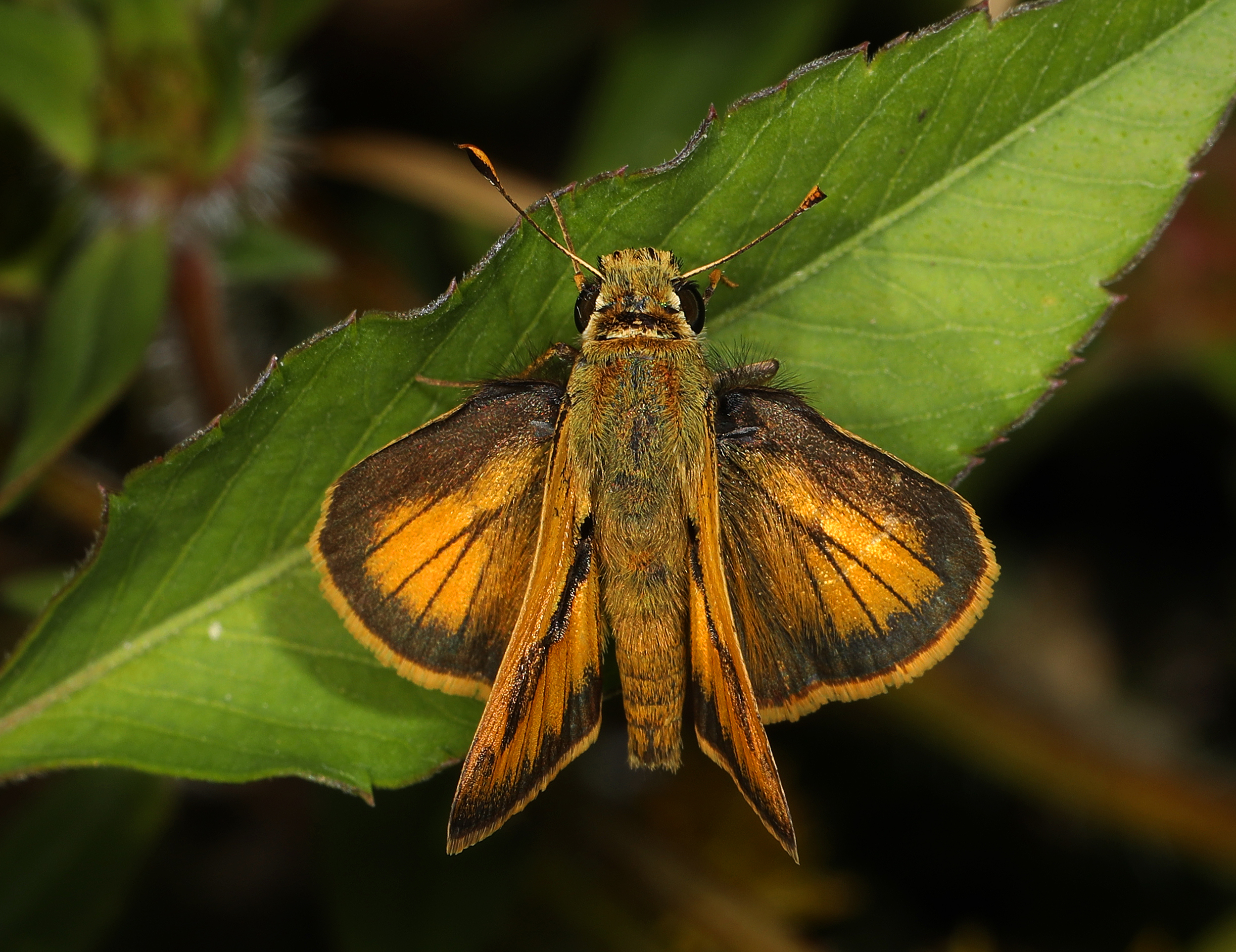
Polites vibex at Dinner Island WMA

1944 U.S. Geological Survey map of Dinner Island

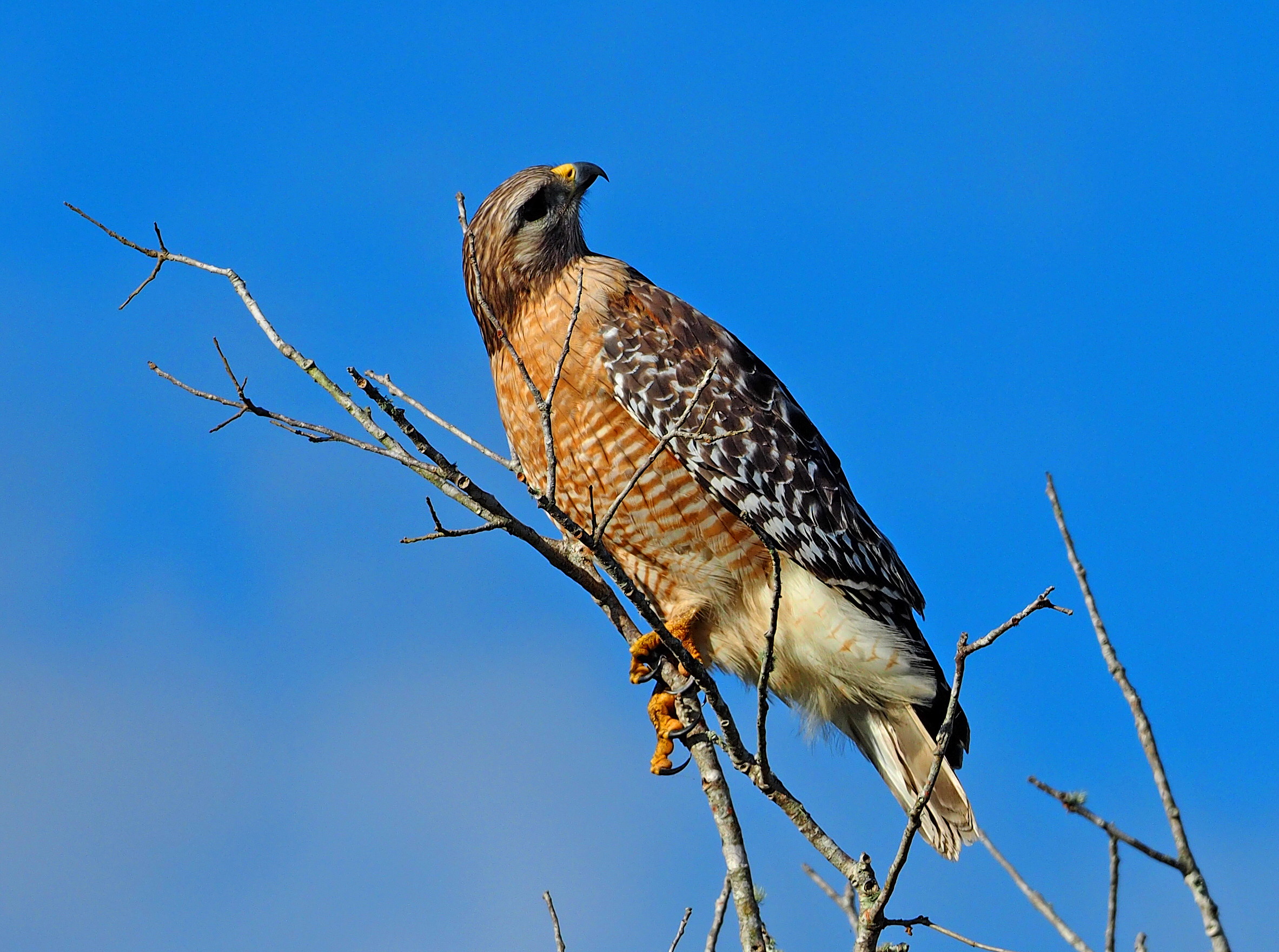
Red-shouldered hawk at Dinner Island WMA

Once inhabited by tribes, it was once part of the Everglades watershed. It was drained and developed for cattle ranching, citrus, and sugarcane production by the Hilliard family. It was acquired for the public in 2003.

Wildlife include deer, hawks such as the red-shouldered hawk, alligators, crested caracara, pileated woodpecker, ibises, sandhill crane, belted kingfisher, and wood stork. Wild pig hunts are done during small game season.

Burrowing owl stowaways on a cruise ship that crossed the Atlantic Ocean to Soain from Florida were returned and released at the WMA.

A correspondent for the Lakeland Ledger wrote about his deer hunt at Dinner Island.

== See also ==
- List of protected areas of Florida
