= Caloosahatchee =

Caloosahatchee may refer to:

- Caloosahatchee River, a river on the southwest Gulf Coast of Florida in the United States
- Caloosahatchee culture, an archaeological culture on the Gulf coast of Southwest Florida that lasted from about 500 to 1750 CE
- Caloosahatchee National Wildlife Refuge, part of the United States National Wildlife Refuge System
- USS Caloosahatchee (AO-98), US Navy ship
