= Great Florida Birding Trail =

Tourist trail in Florida

The Great Florida Birding and Wildlife Trail (GFBWT) is a 2,000 mile (3200 km) long collection of more than 500 locations in the U.S. state of Florida where the state's bird habitats are protected. The trail promotes birdwatching, environmental education and ecotourism. The GFBWT is a program of the Florida Fish and Wildlife Conservation Commission, supported in part by the Florida Department of Transportation and the Wildlife Foundation of Florida. It is modeled after the successful Great Texas Coastal Birding Trail. Trail sites area identifiable by prominent road signs bearing the swallow-tailed kite logo.

The trail is divided into four sections (Panhandle, West, Eastern, and South) each containing at least two 'gateway' sites. Within each section the sites are grouped into clusters. Usually the sites in a cluster are within an hour's drive of each other.

Many of the state's 514 species can be found along the trail, including the roseate spoonbill, limpkin, swallow-tailed kite, red-cockaded woodpecker, smooth-billed ani and the endangered Florida scrub jay.

== Panhandle ==
82 sites in 16 counties

- Big Lagoon State Park - Escambia County
- St. Marks National Wildlife Refuge - Lighthouse Unit - Wakulla County
- St. Vincent National Wildlife Refuge - Franklin & Gulf Counties
- St. George Island State Park - Franklin County

== West ==
119 sites in 21 counties

- Paynes Prairie Preserve State Park - Alachua County
- Fort De Soto Park - Pinellas County
- Weekiwachee Preserve - Hernando County
- Crystal River Archaeological State Park - Citrus County
- Caladesi Island State Park - Pinellas County
- Lower Suwannee National Wildlife Refuge - Dixie & Levy Counties

== Eastern ==
182 sites in 18 counties

- Fort Clinch State Park - Nassau County
- Merritt Island National Wildlife Refuge - Brevard County
- Tenoroc Fish Management Area - Polk County
- Turkey Creek Sanctuary - Brevard County
- Bok Tower Gardens - Polk County

== South ==
122 sites in 12 counties

- Corkscrew Swamp Sanctuary - Collier County
- Conservancy of Southwest Florida Nature Center, Collier County
- Arthur R. Marshall Loxahatchee National Wildlife Refuge - Palm Beach County
- Bahia Honda State Park - Big Pine Key - Monroe County
- Big Cypress National Preserve - Collier County
- Everglades National Park - Collier, Miami-Dade, & Monroe Counties
- John C. and Mariana Jones/Hungryland Wildlife and Environmental Area - Martin & Palm Beach Counties

== See also ==
- State wildlife trails (United States)
