= John C. and Mariana Jones/Hungryland Wildlife and Environmental Area =

Protected wildlife area in Florida

John C. and Mariana Jones/Hungryland Wildlife and Environmental Area (WEA)
- Location within Florida
- Location: Martin and Palm Beach Counties, Florida
- Nearest city: Indiantown, Florida
- Coordinates: 26°58′02″N 080°18′01″E
- Area: more than 16,600 Acres
- Governing body: Florida Fish and Wildlife Conservation Commission

The John C. and Mariana Jones/Hungryland Wildlife and Environmental Area (WEA) is a protected wildlife area located in Florida, United States. Hungryland WEA is the largest area of contiguous wetlands in Martin County, consisting of more than 16,600 acres in Palm Beach and Martin counties. The area has a rich history spanning from prehistoric times to the modern era, and plays an important role in Florida's conservation efforts. It is managed by the Florida Fish and Wildlife Conservation Commission (FWC) as a wildlife and environmental area.

== History ==
=== Native American period ===
The area was originally inhabited by Native Americans who used the land for hunting and fishing, during a period when mastodons and bison roamed the prairies of central and southern Florida. These indigenous cultures were later devastated by diseases introduced by European explorers and direct conflict.

=== Seminole wars ===
In the mid-1800s, the area gained historical significance during the Seminole Indian War of 1835, serving as a refuge for Seminole people attempting to evade the U.S. Army. The region earned its name "Hungryland" during this period, as living off the land proved extremely difficult. Hundreds of starving Seminoles were eventually captured and forcibly relocated to Oklahoma.

=== Development period ===
The late 19th century saw significant logging activity, with virgin timber being harvested and processed at sawmills established along the Jupiter-Indiantown Road (later known as the Central-Dixie Highway or S.R. 29). This road served as a major thoroughfare for local residents until the late 1950s when paved roads were constructed between Indiantown and Jupiter.

=== Real estate controversy ===
In the late 1960s the area, then part of the larger Pal Mar region, became the subject of a controversial real estate development scheme. Developers sold thousands of residential lots, primarily to out-of-state buyers, and began cutting deep canals for drainage. The project was ultimately halted through legal action by Martin County due to the developers' failure to file proper planning documentation.

== Recreation ==
The WEA supports various nature-based, non-motorized recreational activities:

=== Hunting ===
The area is managed for both quota hunts and small game seasons during the fall. Notable game includes small game, white-tailed deer (challenging to hunt), and abundant Wild hogs

Hunters should note that some areas may require wading through up to three feet of water to access hunting spots.

=== Fishing ===
The extensive canal network, remnant of earlier development attempts, provides excellent fishing opportunities for Llarge bass in former borrow pits and pan fish in the canal system

=== Trail activities and camping ===
Multiple established multi-use trails support hiking, biking, primitive camping and horseback riding. Trail conditions can be wet, with optimal use during the drier winter months. Canal levees provide additional recreational paths.

=== Wildlife viewing ===
The Hungryland WEA is part of the Great Florida Birding Trail. Common wildlife sightings include alligators, Bachman's sparrows, bobcats, Everglade snail kites, gopher tortoises, hawks, river otters, wading birds, white-tailed deer, and wild hogs.

== Connected areas ==
=== Pal-mar east ===
Also known as Nine Gems, this recent addition to the WEA includes:

- 320 acres of state lands
- 3,000 acres jointly purchased by Martin County and the South Florida Water Management District
- Approximately 7 miles of horseback riding and hiking trails
- A developed parking trailhead for horse trailers and vehicles
- Access via County Road 711

=== Loxahatchee slough natural area ===
Located approximately 7 miles south of Hungryland, this area:

- Forms part of the Loxahatchee River headwaters
- Contains a segment of the 72-mile Ocean to Lake Trail
- Features pine flatwoods and restored wetlands and uplands
- Is managed by Palm Beach County

== Conservation ==
Prior to state acquisition, local conservation groups, including the Martin County Conservation Alliance, recognized the area's environmental importance and conducted interpretive tours of the property. The land was acquired through multiple conservation programs:

- Save Our Rivers program (1994 and 1997)
- Conservation and Recreation Lands Program (1999)

== Management ==
The area is managed to protect unique natural resources and support ecosystem restoration. Motorized vehicles, including cars, trucks, and ATVs, are strictly prohibited unless specifically authorized. This restriction helps preserve the conservation value of the land.

== Namesake ==
The WEA was named c.2002 in honor of Johnny and Marianna Jones, who with Marjory Stoneman Douglas and Arthur R. Marshall, were significant figures in Florida's conservation movement. During their 61-year marriage, the couple:

- Served as leaders of the Florida Wildlife Federation
- Advocated for environmental protection throughout Florida
- Contributed to the establishment of over 3 million acres of public lands
- Played an instrumental role in creating the wildlife and environmental area that now bears their name
