= Tosohatchee Wildlife Management Area =

Wildlife management area in Florida

Tosohatchee Wildlife Management Area (WMA)
- IUCN category V (protected landscape/seascape)
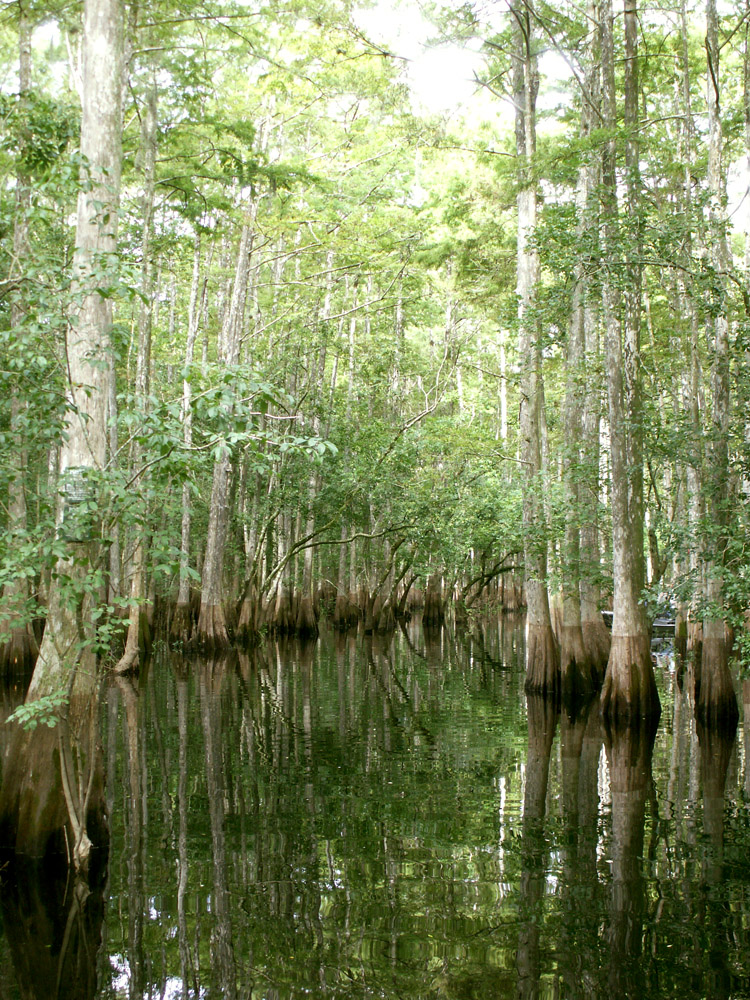

- Location within the United States
- Location: Orange County, Florida, United States
- Nearest city: Christmas, Florida
- Coordinates: 28°29′56″N 80°55′01″W
- Area: 28,000 acres (11,000 ha)
- Governing body: Florida Fish and Wildlife Conservation Commission

Tosohatchee Wildlife Management Area is located along the St. Johns River east of Orlando in Christmas on Taylor Creek Road, off SR 50.

== Flora ==
The wildlife management area (WMA) contains 1000 acres of old growth floodplain swamp, twenty to forty acres of old growth mesic flatwoods and an unknown acreage of old growth hydric hammock.

== Fauna ==
Among the wildlife of this 30,701-acre (124.24 km^{2}) wildlife management area (WMA) are song birds, wading birds and migratory waterfowl. The WMA is home to bald eagle, turkey, hawks, and owls, as well as white-tailed deer, bobcat, fox squirrel, and gray fox. Other animals that can be seen at the park are alligator, otter, and turtles. The WMA also contains rare and endangered plants.

== Recreational Activities ==
Activities include hiking, biking, and primitive back-pack camping, as well as horseback riding, hunting, fishing, geocaching, and nature study.

Amenities include access to the St. Johns River, a horse camp, a youth camp, two primitive backpack campsites, and more than fifty miles of trails. During the rainy season the trails may be under water.
