= Perry Oldenburg Wildlife and Environmental Area =

Wildlife reserve in Florida, U.S.

Coordinates: 28.615°N 82.324°W

Perry Oldenburg Wildlife and Environmental Area is northeast of Brooksville, Florida in Hernando County, Florida. It is managed by the Florida Fish and Wildlife Conservation Commission. It was named for FWC biologist Perry W. Oldenburg. The 380 acre preserve in the Brooksville Ridge was part of an Audubon Society wildlife sanctuary.

The area includes a 1.5-mile trail. Habitats include sandhill and hardwood hammock. A powerline right-of-way transits the area. Wildlife include gopher tortoise, American Kestrel, Eastern Bluebird, hawks, woodpeckers, and butterflies.

Oldenburg died December 2, 1991.

Waynesburg University students helped restore a trail and removed invasives.
