= Lake Marion Creek Wildlife Management Area =

Protected area in Florida, US

Coordinates: 28.1429°N 81.5346°W

Lake Marion Creek Wildlife Management Area is a 8,000-acre (32 km^{2}) preserve in Polk County, Florida. It is five miles east of Haines City off SR 580.

Lake Marion is in the area and there is a trail network. Wildlife in the area include White-tailed deer, wild hogs (an invasive species), wading birds, Florida scrub-jays, gopher tortoises, and sand skinks. A brochure and pdf map are online. The Florida Fish and Wildlife Conservation Commission (FWC) website states it is a good area for squirrel hunting.

Habitats in the area include white scrub sands, hilly scrub, pine flatwoods, and riverine swamp forest. The endangered blushing scrub balm wildflower grows in the area. As of 2025, a proposed route for a new tollroad would go through the plant's limited habitat.

Snell Creek passes through the area. Bellini Preserve in Poinciana, Florida and Sherwool L. Stokes Preserve in Haines City are nearby on Lake Marion.
