= Escribano Point Wildlife Management Area =

Wildlife management area in Florida, US

- Location within Florida
- Location: Santa Rosa County, Florida
- Nearest city: Pensacola, Florida
- Coordinates: 30°30′13″N 87°0′48″W
- Area: 4,057 acres (1,642 ha)
- Established: 2004; 22 years ago
- Governing body: Florida Fish and Wildlife Conservation Commission

Escribano Point Wildlife Management Area (EPWMA) contains 4,057 acres of salt marsh, shrub bog, and sandhill habitat fourteen miles north of Pensacola in Santa Rosa County, Florida. In 2004, an initial 1,166 acres were acquired by the Florida Forever program and leased to the Florida Fish and Wildlife Conservation Commission to establish the EPWMA.

== Flora and fauna ==
Over ten miles of natural coastline are protected within Escribano Point WMA. These serve as productive habitat for a wide range of wildlife. Numerous bird species occupy these coastal habitats including piping plover, least tern, black skimmer, and a variety of migratory songbirds. Herpetological surveys have documented the presence of many uncommon reptiles and amphibians, including one federally-endangered species. Florida black bear are known to occur in the area.

A high diversity of plants occur within the many natural communities found within Escribano Point Wildlife Management Area. Carnivorous white-topped pitcher plants, purple pitcher plants, and spoon-leaved sundew may be observed in shrub bogs, especially those that have been burned recently. The rare panhandle lily grows here as well.

== Recreational activities ==
Fishing is quite popular at Escribano Point WMA. Freshwater species such as black bass and catfish are abundant, as are saltwater species such as spotted seatrout and red drum. Paddling opportunities exist, both in Blackwater Bay and in the tidal creeks that meander through the area. A hiking trail and network of gated roads allow visitors to see many different natural habitats.

== Federal lands ==
A permit is required from Eglin Air Force Base to access Department of Defense Lands.
