= Chassahowitzka Wildlife Management Area =

Conservation area in Florida

Chassahowitzka Wildlife Management Area (WMA)
- Location within Florida
- Location: Hernando County, Florida
- Nearest city: Weeki Wachee, Florida
- Coordinates: 28°36′58″N 82°36′22″W
- Area: 24,243 acres (98.11 km^{2})
- Governing body: Florida Fish and Wildlife Conservation Commission

Chassahowitzka Wildlife Management Area (WMA) preserves 24,243 acres of sandhill, mesic hammock, and forested wetland habitat ten miles north of Weeki Wachee in Hernando County, Florida. The area consists of one large tract of land, with three satellite tracts nearby.

== Fauna ==
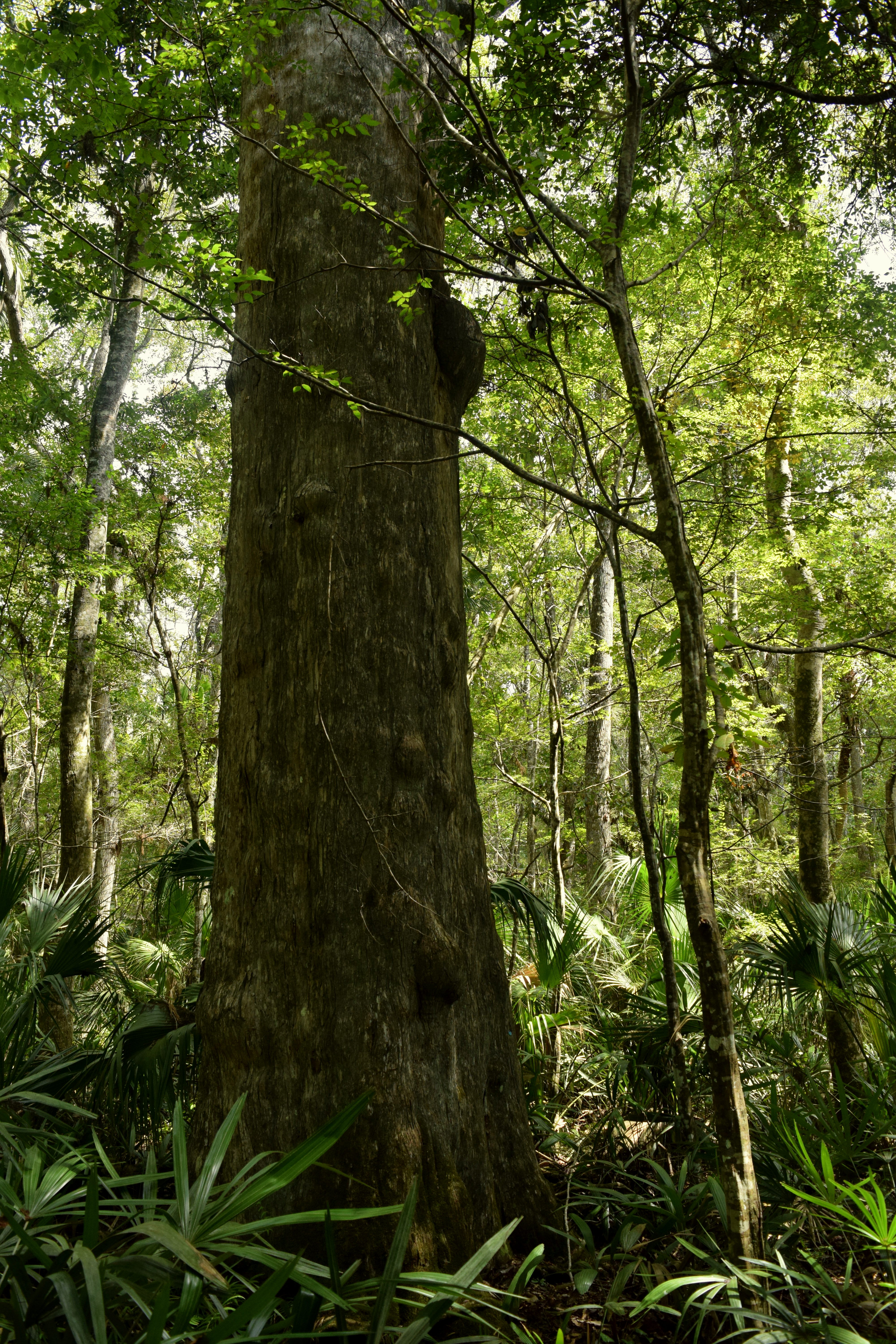
An old growth cypress stands in a remote section of Chassahowitzka Wildlife Management Area.

Chassahowitzka WMA, in conjunction with neighboring Chassahowitzka National Wildlife Refuge, protects the largest continuous block of habitat in this region of Florida. The property is expansive enough to house a remnant population of Florida black bear, although this population is threatened by fragmentation. Other wildlife includes gopher tortoises, Sherman's fox squirrel, and many imperiled snake species. Underwater caves house populations of troglobitic invertebrate species.

== Recreational Activities ==
A network of unpaved roads, old logging trams, and two interpretive trails offer visitors a range of options of explore this area. Biking and hiking are both popular activities. A high diversity of bird and butterfly species attract viewers of both taxonomic groups.

White-tailed deer, feral hog, and small game hunting is productive at this WMA and general gun season is especially popular.

=== Underwater caves ===
Chassahowitzka Wildlife Management Area contains two well-known underwater caves: Buford Springs and Eagle's Nest Sink. These caves are popular with the cave-diving community and have claimed several lives.

== Centralia ==
A logging boom town once operated in what is now Chassahowitzka WMA. The town was developed in conjunction with cypress logging efforts initiated by Edgar Roberts of the Central Cypress Company. Logging began with the construction of a sawmill around 1910 and continued until the lack of trees made it unprofitable around 1917. The post office closed in 1922. The town, at one time, had a population of over 1,500 people and included a post office, general store, sawmill, and hotel.

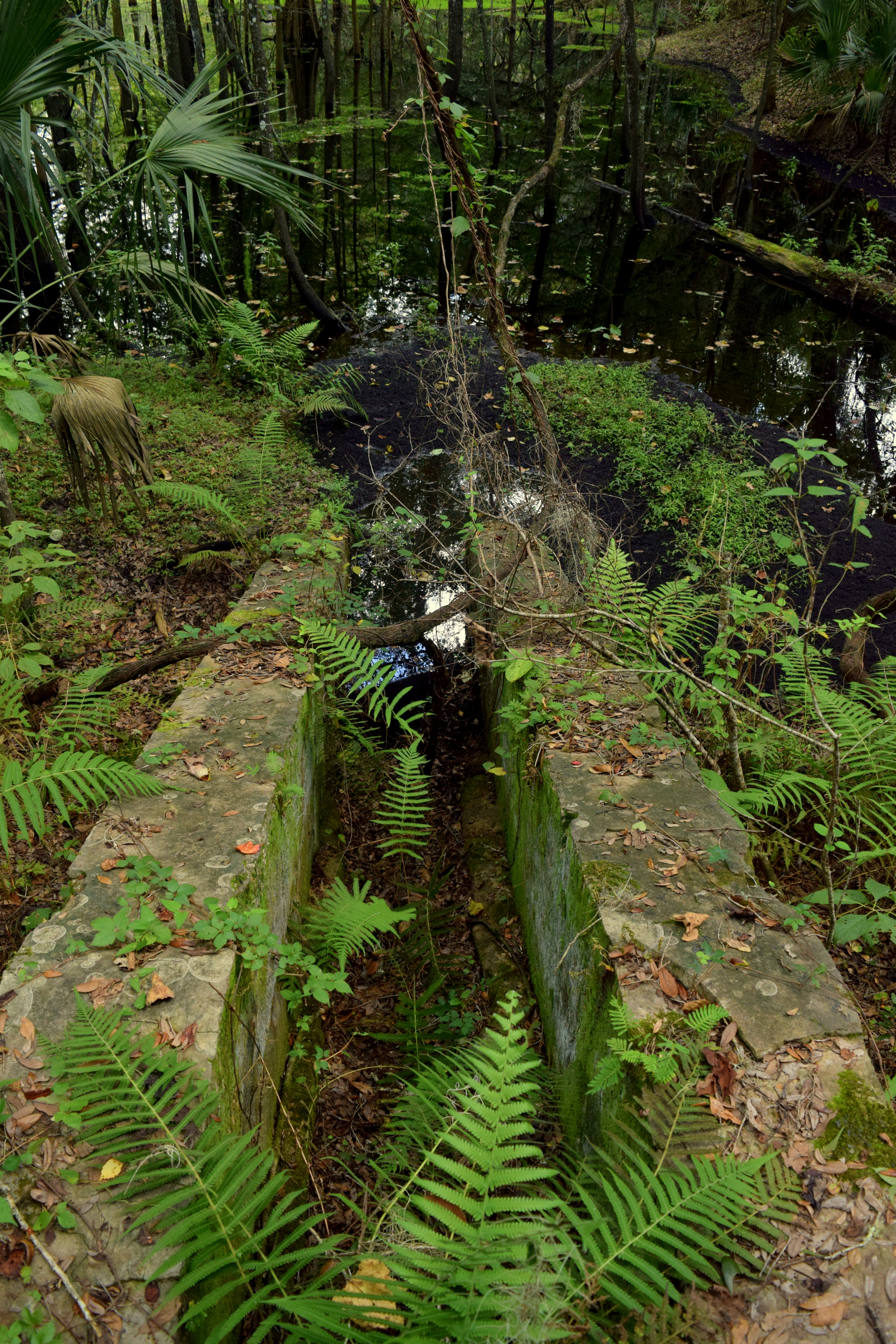
A structure once used to drag large cypress logs from the mill pond to the sawmill at Centralia.

Today, visitors can still see foundations of the sawmill, the pond where trees floated before going to the sawmill, and other miscellaneous artifacts from Centralia. A few ancient cypress trees still survive deep within the swamp and are visible off of old tram roads.
