= Hilochee Wildlife Management Area =

Conservation area in Florida

Coordinates: 28.364°N 81.730°W

Hilochee Wildlife Management Area is a set of conservation area parcels in Lake County and Polk County, Florida.

== Overview ==
It covers 6,093 acres (2,466 ha). It is between Road 557 nearly to US Highway 27 and includes two entrances and trails. Scheduled hunts are offered. Controversy arose when part of it was listed as under consideration for sale by the state.

A wildlife passageway connects areas on both sides of Interstate 4 (I-4).

The main unit is 10 miles (16 km) south of Clermont and the Osprey Unit is 15 miles (24 km) northeast of Lakeland.

It is managed by the Florida Fish and Wildlife Conservation Commission. A link with the Auburndale TECO Trail was planned in 2014.

The area included ditches for drainage to enhance cattle grazing and it has been mined and logged. Roads were built in it. A go-kart track was built. It includes scrub and sandhill habitats. Citrus plantations were in the area but were susceptible to freezes, and slash pine plantations replaced some. Restoration works have included addressing the damming effects of roads including I-4 and prescribed burns. Pitcher plants grown in the area, which is part of the Green Swamp area of critical concern.

A brochure was published in 2015.
