= Suwannee Ridge Wildlife and Environmental Area =

Nature preserve in Hamilton County, Florida

Suwannee Ridge Wildlife and Environmental Area (WEA) conserves 1,428 acres of longleaf pine uplands, karst topography and hardwood hammocks ten miles southwest of Jasper in Hamilton County, Florida, United States.

== Fauna ==
Suwannee Ridge Wildlife and Environmental Area (WEA)
- Location within Florida
- Location: Hamilton County, Florida
- Nearest city: Jasper, Florida
- Coordinates: 30°27′40″N 83°3′52″W
- Area: 1,428 acres (578 ha)
- Governing body: Florida Fish and Wildlife Conservation Commission

This WEA was originally established to serve as a mitigation area for gopher tortoises displaced by development. Their burrows may be seen throughout the sandhill habitat. The imperiled Sherman's fox squirrel is commonly seen, as are game species such as white-tailed deer and wild turkey. The proximity of the Suwannee River makes this property attractive to resident and migratory birds while numerous wildflower species attract butterflies and other pollinators.

== Recreational activities ==
A 0.8 mile loop trails passes through sandhill habitat and passes several sinkholes. Over 18 miles of unpaved roads offer additional hiking and wildlife-viewing opportunities. Good populations of white-tailed deer and wild turkey provide opportunities to hunters throughout much of the year.
