= J.W. Corbett Wildlife Management Area =

Protected area in Florida, United States

Coordinates: 26.868180°N 80.389732°W

J.W. Corbett Wildlife Management Area is a protected area of 60,348 acres of land in Florida. It is located east of Lake Okeechobee, 25 miles northwest of West Palm Beach. It includes Big Mound City and is connected to DuPuis Management Area.

It is along the Ocean to Lake Trail and the Great Florida Birding and Wildlife Trail. The site is under the protection of the Florida Fish and Wildlife Conservation Commission.
