= Apalachicola River Wildlife and Environmental Area =

Geography of Apalachicola

Apalachicola River Wildlife and Environmental Area (WEA)
- Location within Florida
- Location: Franklin and Gulf County, Florida
- Nearest city: Eastpoint, Florida
- Coordinates: 29°48′32″N 84°57′39″W
- Area: 63,257 acres (25,599 ha)
- Governing body: Florida Fish and Wildlife Conservation Commission

Apalachicola River Wildlife and Environmental Area (ARWEA) contains 63,257 acres of pine upland, floodplain swamp, savanna, and estuary habitat north of Eastpoint and Apalachicola in Franklin County and Gulf County, Florida.

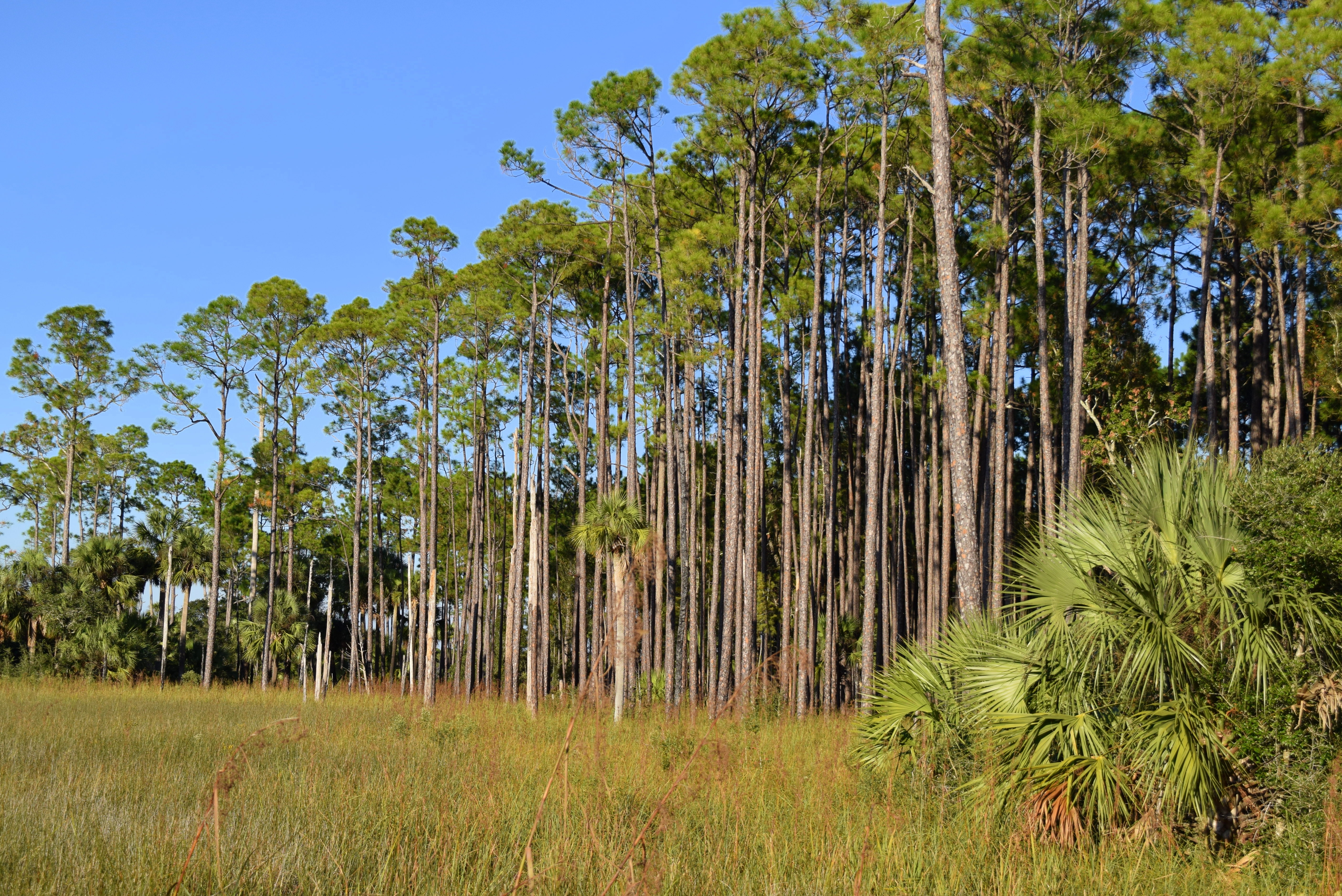
Pines abutting the estuary at ARWEA

== Flora and fauna ==
Plant and animal diversity is high within the Lower Apalachicola River system and many imperiled species call this property home. These species include red-cockaded woodpeckers, Bachman's sparrow, Apalachicola alligator snapping turtles, and Florida black bears. Additionally, dozens of migratory bird species pass through the area each spring and fall.

ARWEA is widely recognized for its wildflower diversity. Carnivorous pitcher plants and butterworts, along with several orchid species, may be seen throughout the year.

== Recreational activities ==
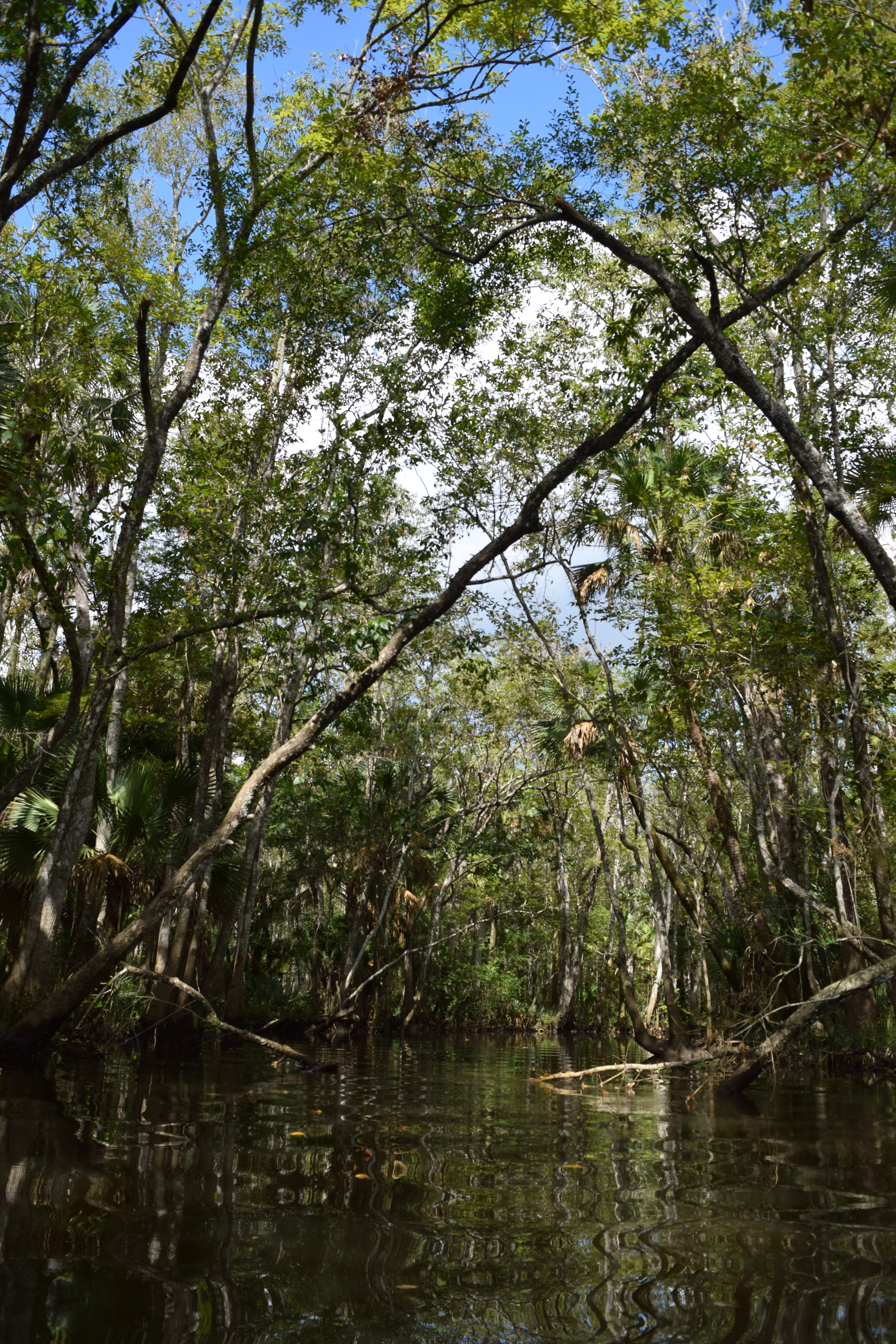
View along Paddling Trip 12 in ARWEA

Numerous recreational activities are available to participate in at ARWEA. The ARWEA paddling trail system consists of over 100 miles of trails that pass through old-growth cypress swamps, estuaries and small Apalachicola Bay tributaries. The Tank Island Wildflower Driving Tour allows visitors to see many of the notable wildflower species found in the area.

Anglers fish from the bank or from boats for a wide range of freshwater and saltwater species including striped bass, largemouth bass, and catfish. Squirrel, dove and feral hogs attract are pursued most frequently by hunters. Additionally, camping is permitted at four primitive campsites.
