= St. Vincent National Wildlife Refuge =

United States National Wildlife Refuge in Florida

- IUCN category V (protected landscape/seascape)
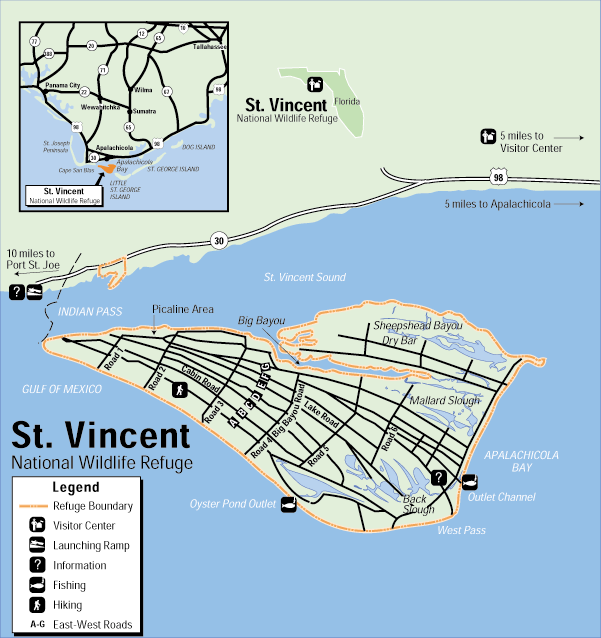
- Map of St. Vincent Island

- Location within Florida
- Location: Franklin and Gulf counties, Florida, United States
- Nearest city: Apalachicola, Florida
- Coordinates: 29°38′40″N 85°07′47″W
- Area: 12,490 acres (5,050 ha)
- Established: 1968
- Governing body: US Fish & Wildlife Service
- Website: St. Vincent National Wildlife Refuge

The St. Vincent National Wildlife Refuge is part of the United States National Wildlife Refuge System, located in the Gulf of Mexico off the coast of Apalachicola, on the barrier island of St. Vincent. The refuge includes Pig Island (46 acres, undeveloped), located in the southwest corner of St. Joseph Bay, nearly 9 miles west of St. Vincent and 86 acres of mainland Florida along Franklin County Road 30A. The 12,490-acre (51 km^{2}) refuge was established in 1968.

The purpose of the refuge is to provide habitat for migratory birds including some endangered species. About 277 bird species use the islands as a migratory stopping point annually. St. Vincent Island and Pig Island are open for recreational activities and are accessible only by boat. The islands contain undeveloped trails and beaches, with no visitor center, drinking water or restrooms. Saint Vincent is the westernmost of four barrier islands in the Northwestern Florida Gulf.

== History ==
The earliest documented inhabitants of the land date back to the year 240 (based on pottery shards), when Native Americans lived on St. Vincent Island. Records indicate that the island likely fell within the territory of the Chine people, who were known for their piloting expertise along the coast from Apalachee Bay to Mobile Bay.

After the 1704 Apalachee Massacre, the native residents either perished or were displaced, and the island changed hands among various European ancestry owners.

In the 1940s, the island was stocked with non-native species, including zebra, sambar deer, eland, black buck, ring-necked pheasant, Asian junglefowl, bobwhite quail and wild turkey.

In 1968, The Nature Conservancy purchased the island for $2.2 million, and the U.S. Fish and Wildlife Service repaid them with proceeds from Duck Stamp sales. Subsequently, the St. Vincent National Wildlife Refuge was established.

== Climate ==
The climate is mild and subtropical, typical of the Gulf Coast, with an average annual rainfall of 57 inches. The triangular island is larger than most of the northern Gulf coast barrier islands and dissected by dune ridges, freshwater lakes and sloughs on the east end. The west end supports dry upland pine forests.

== Wildlife ==
Depending on the season, many species can be observed, a number of them being endangered or threatened. In the spring, several species on the island nest and go through reproductive ritual behavior, such as the osprey, softshell turtle and wood duck. During this season, white-tailed deer bucks shed their antlers and young bald eagles fledge. In the summer, loggerhead sea turtles lay eggs on the beach, and alligators nest in the marshes. Summer bird species include wood storks, snowy plovers and American oystercatchers. During the fall, the islands experience the highest rate of migration stop-overs, which may include peregrine falcons. The white-tailed deer rut occurs in the winter season. In winter, waterfowl are most numerous; bald eagles and great horned owls nest. Year-round inhabitants include alligators, other reptiles and many other animal species.

== Role in Red Wolf Recovery Program ==
Since 1990, St. Vincent National Wildlife Refuge has been a breeding ground for endangered red wolves. The wolves are allowed to roam the island and once the pups are weaned by their mother, they are taken to the Alligator River National Wildlife Refuge in North Carolina.

== Activities ==
Various activities include sea kayaking, boating destinations, fishing, and birding. People are permitted to hike and bike on interior paths. Not all roads are still in use, and only the main road (B Road) is lined with oyster shells for easier travel over the sandy soil of the island. Popular activities include wildlife viewing and fishing from one of the four lakes for largemouth bass and bluegill. Visitors are encouraged to practice 'leave no trace' principles on the island.

=== Hunting ===
Annual primitive hunts help keep the population of sambar deer, white-tailed deer, feral hogs, and raccoons in check. Licenses for hunts are awarded by lottery and are managed by the Florida Fish and Wildlife Commission. Three public hunts are held each year between November and January. The Refuge is closed to the general public during hunts.

=== Boat Access ===
The closest boat ramp to the island is a quarter mile away at the end of Indian Pass Rd (County Rd 30B) and is open to the public. Indian Pass is located 22 miles west of Apalachicola. Boaters should be sensitive to winds, tide fluctuations, currents, storms and oyster bars. Private shuttle services to the island are available from local boat captains. No fees (except for hunts) or passes are needed to visit the island. All units are open to the public, except a portion of the Refuge on the mainland known as the "11 Mile Site" for its location on 11 Mile Rd.

== Fire management ==
Before St. Vincent Island was altered with roads, lightning could ignite fires that burned throughout the island's various habitats. Now, when lightning starts a fire, the refuge fire staff can decide where to stop the wildfire. Refuge staff use tactics that minimize damage to the hydrology of the island. These tactics may include using water, building control lines, or using a controlled fire called a back fire against the wildfire. Fire staff also ignite planned burns called prescribed burns to mimic the naturally occurring lightning fires. Fire reduces the amount of leaves from flammable fire-dependent plants, which reduces the potential damage of any future wildfire.

== Gallery ==
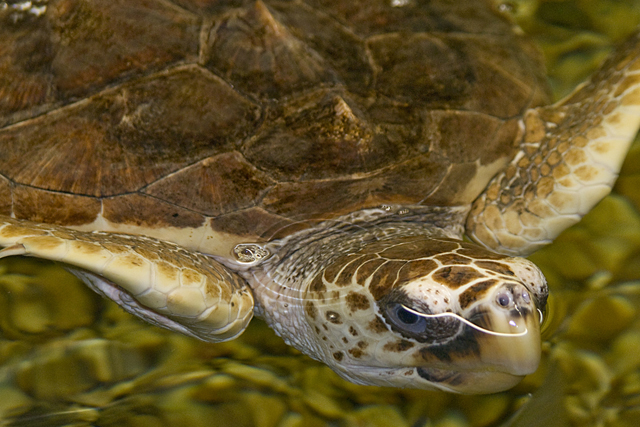
Loggerhead sea turtle

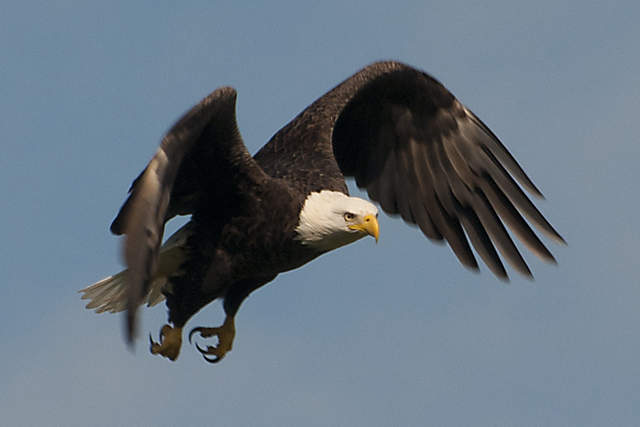
Bald eagle

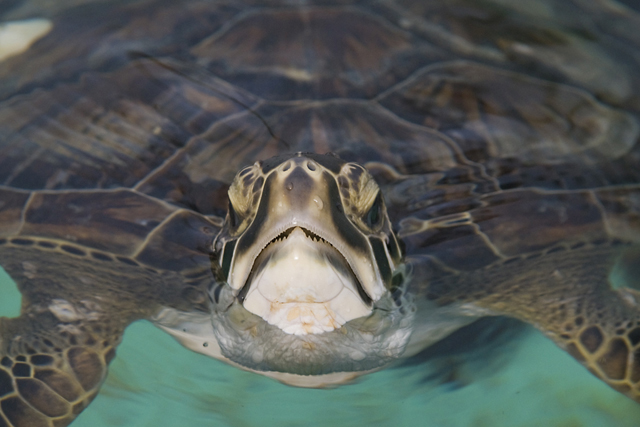
Green sea turtle

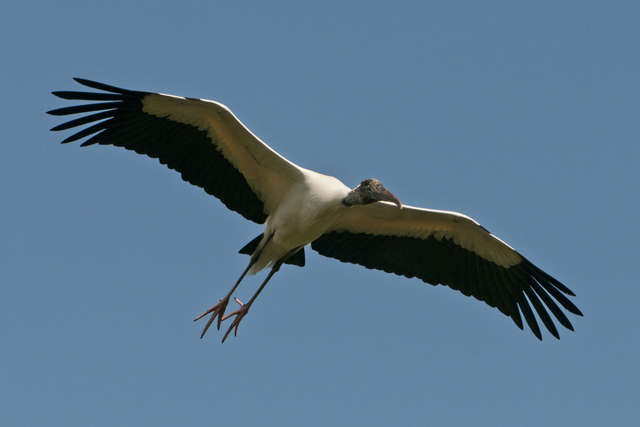
Wood stork in flight

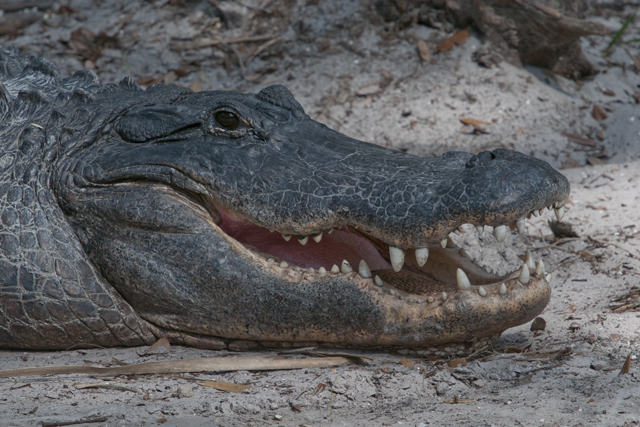
Florida alligator

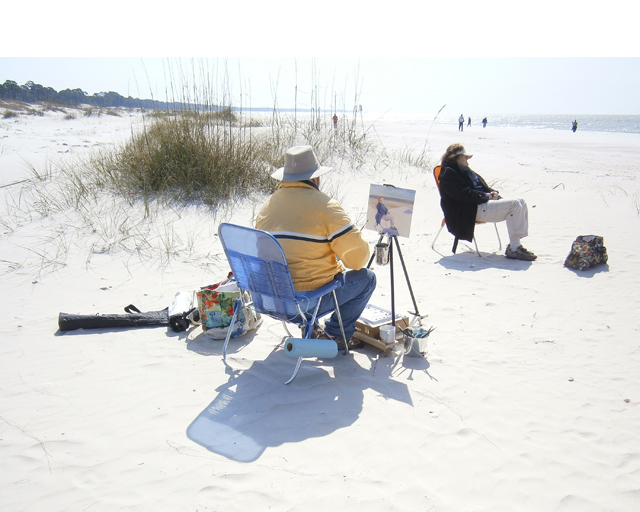
Painting on the beach

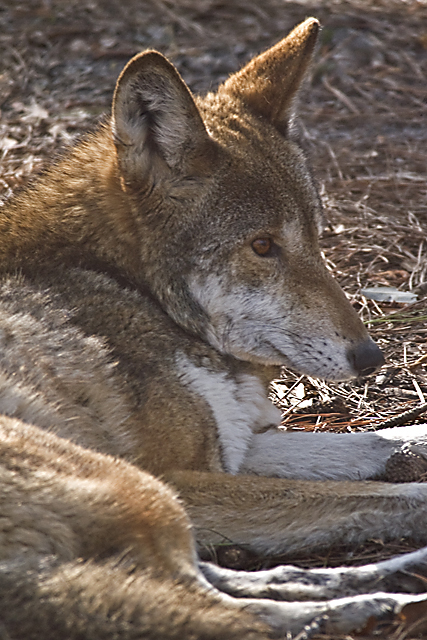
Endangered red wolf

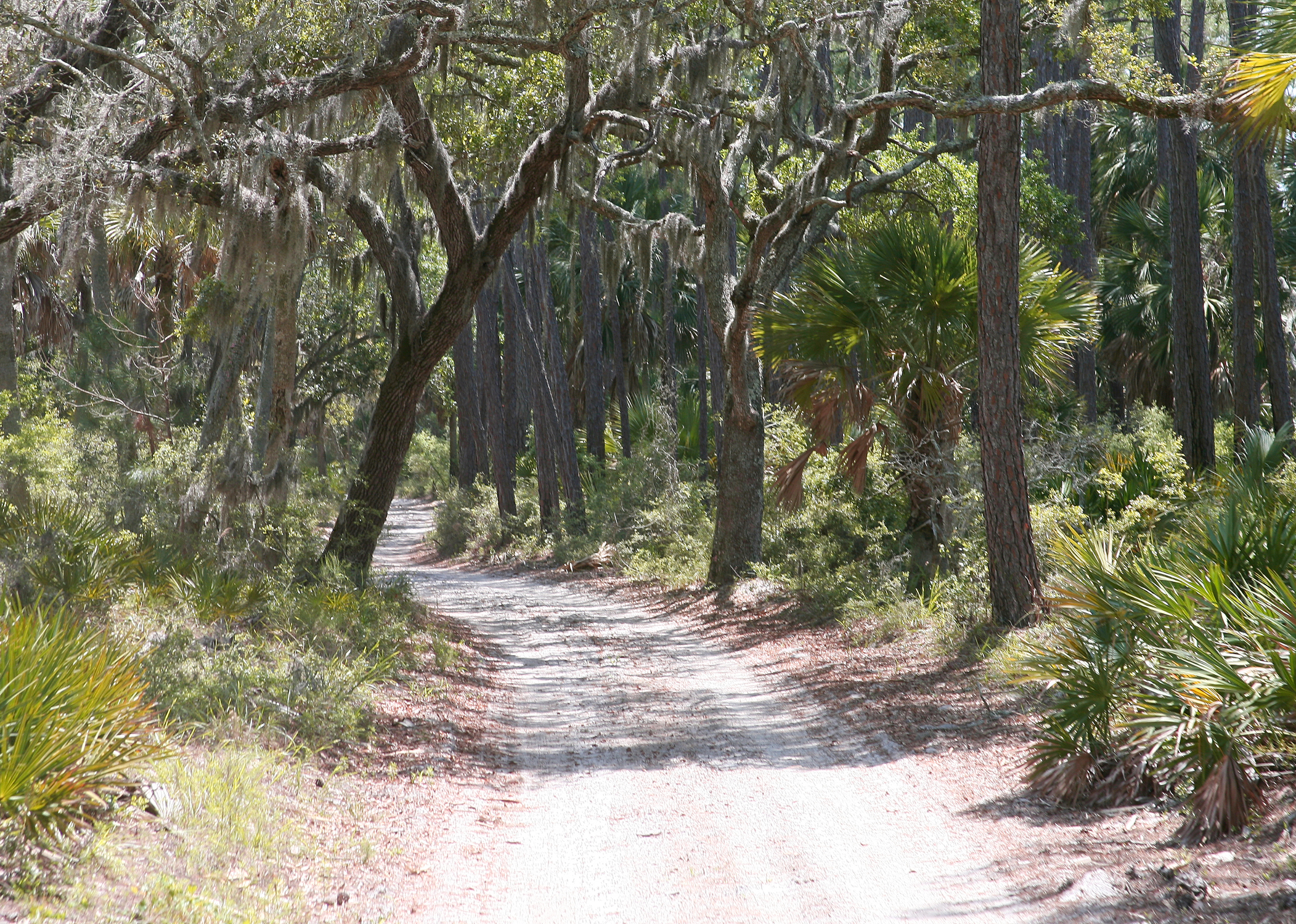
An interior road on the island

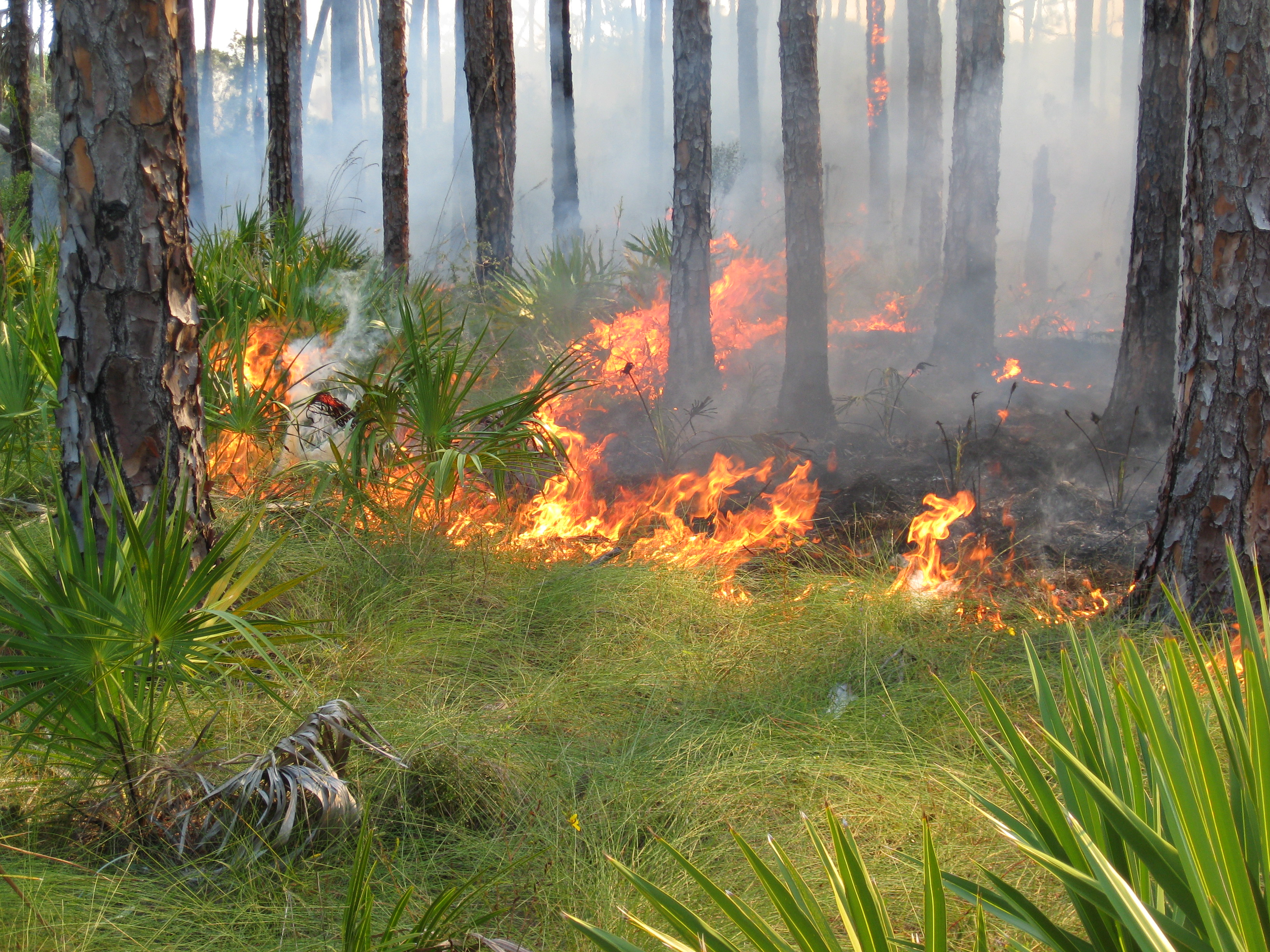
Prescribed burn of pine habitat on the island

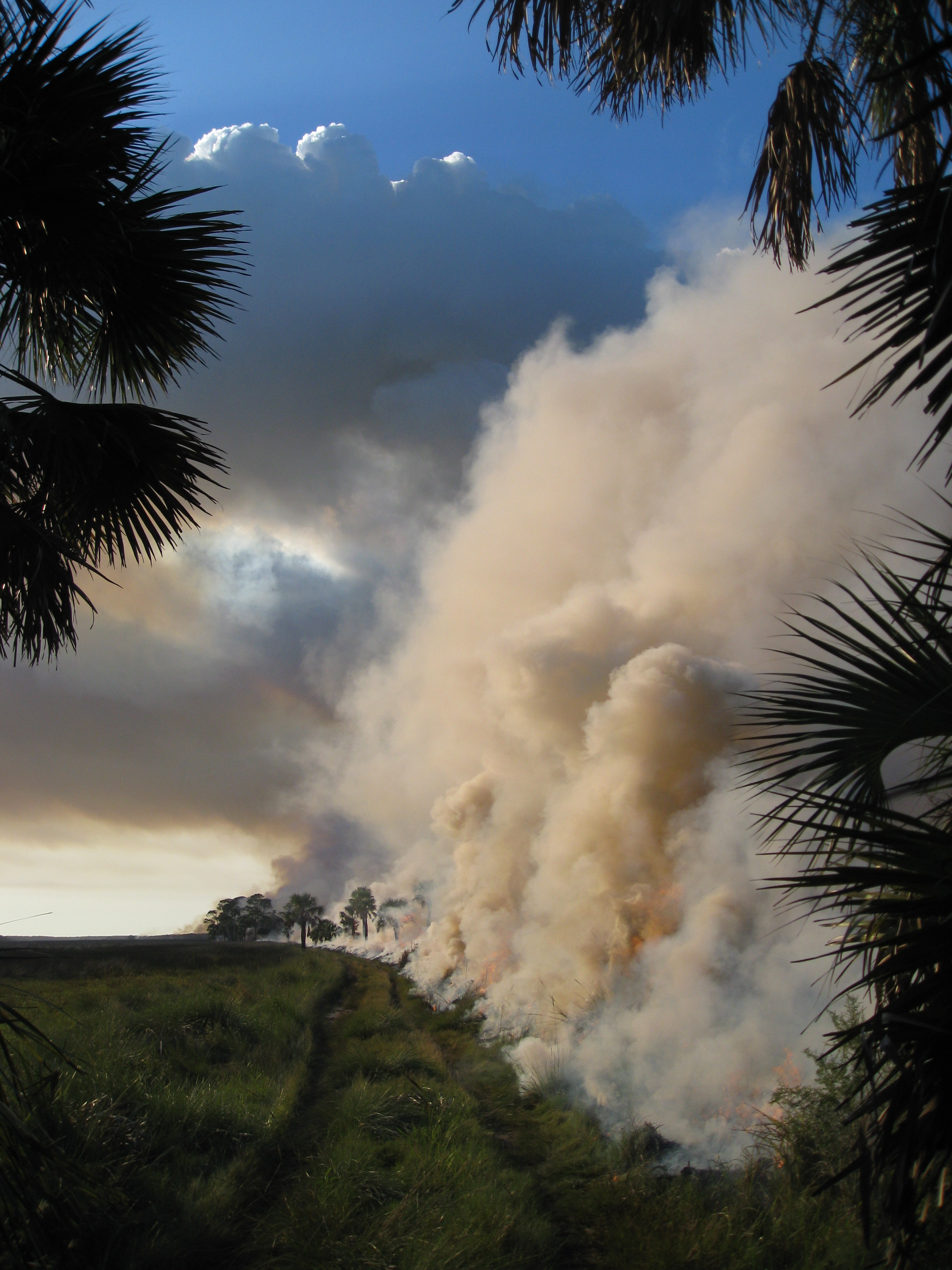
Prescribed fire on St. Vincent Island
