= Ocean to Lake Trail =

Trail in Florida, USA

- Length: 63 miles (101 km)
- Location: Florida
- Trailheads: West: 26.9502°N 80.6099°W; East: 27.0663°N 80.1162°W

Ocean to Lake Trail is a 63-mile greenway spur off the Florida Trail. It starts at Hobe Sound Beach and ends at Lake Okeechobee in Port Mayaca. The trail is under development as of 2012 and portions are open to the public in Jonathan Dickinson State Park, Corbett Wildlife Management Area, and DuPuis Reserve. The 2012 Ocean To Lake Greenway Celebration included horseback riding, cycling, hiking and trail running.

The route was explored in February 2004, when a group of Florida Trail members backpacked the area to help develop final routing. The project includes Palm Beach County, Martin County, South Florida Water Management District, Florida Department of Environmental Protection, and the Army Corps of Engineers, as well as volunteers from the Florida Trail Association who have been flagging and constructing the route. Bridges and canal crossings are being constructed as the route is finalized.
