= Island Bay National Wildlife Refuge =

United States National Wildlife Refuge in Florida

- IUCN category Ia (strict nature reserve)
- Location within Florida Location within the United States
- Location: Charlotte County, Florida, United States
- Nearest city: Port Charlotte, Florida
- Coordinates: 26°46′20″N 82°11′30″W
- Area: 20 acres (81,000 m^{2})
- Established: October 23, 1908
- Governing body: US Fish & Wildlife Service
- Website: Island Bay National Wildlife Refuge

The Island Bay National Wildlife Refuge is part of the United States National Wildlife Refuge System, located in the Cape Haze area of Charlotte County. The 20-acre (81,000 m^{2}) refuge was established on October 23, 1908. The National Wildlife Refuge System consists of over 570 national wildlife refuges that protect the country's ecosystems and the wildlife that live in them. Island Bay National Wildlife Refuge was created as a preserve and breeding ground for native birds, which contains brackish water and mangroves. Some animals that can be found at the refuge include migratory birds, West Indian Manatees, osprey, wood storks, and occasionally alligators and crocodiles.

The Island Bay Wilderness (which was established on October 23, 1970) covers the same area as the refuge.

== History of Refuge ==
President Theodore Roosevelt created the Island Bay National Wildlife Refuge after signing Executive Order 958 on October 23, 1908. Following this, President Nixon signed Public Law 91-504 on October 23, 1970, which turned the refuge into a designated Wilderness Area. On August 13, 2004, the refuge suffered extreme damage from Hurricane Charley. Island Bay National Wildlife Refuge is now managed by J.N. "Ding" Darling National Wildlife Refuge. While there is no access to the islands, several shell mounds pay tribute to the Native Americans who previously lived there.

== Accessing the Refuge ==
Island Bay National Wildlife Refuge is only accessible by boat, and it does not allow visitors. It is located on the north side of Charlotte Harbor in Turtle Bay. Boaters must check navigational charts and tide schedules before attempting to access the refuge, as oyster bars and shallow waters can make navigation difficult, and the fragile seabed must be protected.
