= Andrews Wildlife Management Area =

Protected area in Florida, United States

Andrews Wildlife Management Area (WMA)
- Location within Florida Location within the United States
- Location: Levy County, Florida
- Nearest city: Chiefland, Florida
- Coordinates: 29°33′42″N 82°55′23″W
- Area: 3,582 Acres
- Governing body: Florida Fish and Wildlife Conservation Commission

Andrews Wildlife Management Area is located on the Suwannee River, five miles north of Chiefland in Levy County, Florida.

== Fauna ==
The largest continuous tract of old-growth hardwood hammock forest in Florida exists within this 3,582 acre Wildlife Management Area (WMA). The old trees provide homes for flying squirrels, owls, and several bat species including Rafinesque's big-eared bat. North American river otters, Suwannee alligator snapping turtles, and many snake species utilize the cypress/tupelo swamps. Gulf sturgeon can often be seen leaping out of the water from the bank of the Suwannee River.

== Recreational activities ==
Over ten miles of trails and unpaved roads traverse Andrews WMA. An interpretive boardwalk travels through a transition of habitats from upland forest to floodplain swamp. Andrews WMA is a site on the Great Florida Birding and Wildlife Trail.

Hunting is popular at this WMA due to robust wild turkey, white-tailed deer, and feral hog populations. Fishing can be productive in the Suwannee River, both from boats and from the shore.

== See also ==
- Andrews, Levy County, Florida
