= J. N. "Ding" Darling National Wildlife Refuge =

United States National Wildlife Refuge in Florida

J.N. 'Ding' Darling National Wildlife Refuge
- IUCN category IV (habitat/species management area)
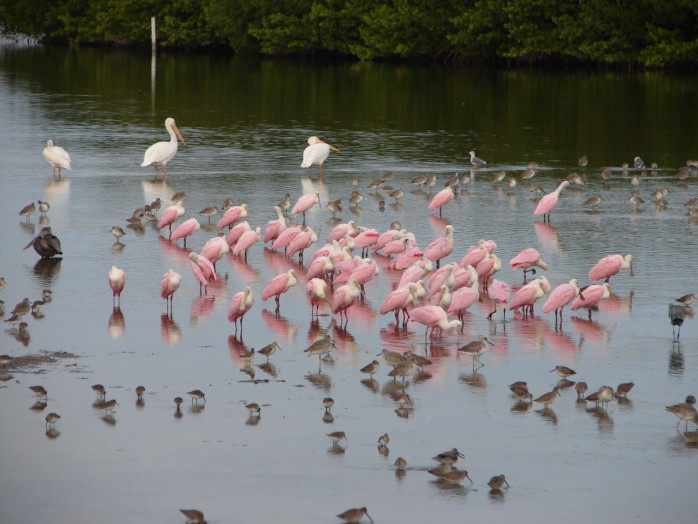
- Birds at the refuge, including shorebirds, American white pelicans, and roseate spoonbills

- Location within Florida Location within the United States
- Location: Lee County, Florida, United States
- Nearest city: Sanibel, Florida
- Coordinates: 26°27′30″N 82°06′00″W
- Area: 5,200 acres (2,100 ha)
- Established: 1976
- Named for: Jay Norwood "Ding" Darling
- Governing body: US Fish & Wildlife Service
- Website: J. N. "Ding" Darling National Wildlife Refuge

The J. N. "Ding" Darling National Wildlife Refuge is part of the United States National Wildlife Refuge System, located in southwestern Florida on Sanibel Island in the Gulf of Mexico. "Ding" Darling Wildlife Society (DDWS), a non-profit Friends of the Refuge organization, supports environmental education and services at the J.N. "Ding" Darling National Wildlife Refuge. It is named after the cartoonist Jay Norwood "Ding" Darling.

== History and description ==
The 5200 acre (21 km^{2}) refuge was established in 1945, to protect one of the country's largest undeveloped mangrove ecosystems.

The J. N. "Ding" Darling National Wildlife Refuge Complex consists of the following: the Darling Refuge itself, and the Caloosahatchee, Island Bay, Matlacha, and Pine Island National Wildlife Refuges.

The northern section of the refuge is in the J.N. Ding Darling Wilderness, which was created in 1976 and currently protects 2,619 acres (1,060 ha) or 41% of the refuge.

The refuge is well known for its migratory bird populations and birdwatching opportunities. It also home to raccoons, bobcats, river otters, alligators, and marsh rabbits.

== Climate impacts ==
Hurricane Charley struck the refuge on August 13, 2004, causing major changes to the topography and ecology.

Sea level rise has increased beach erosion on the barrier islands which protect Ding Darling's manatee habitat. Rising temperatures are increasing the ratio of female hatchlings of Ding Darling's endangered Florida loggerhead turtle population. The refuge's American alligator population is decreasing, due to increased salinity and a reduction of the freshwater flow in its mangroves.

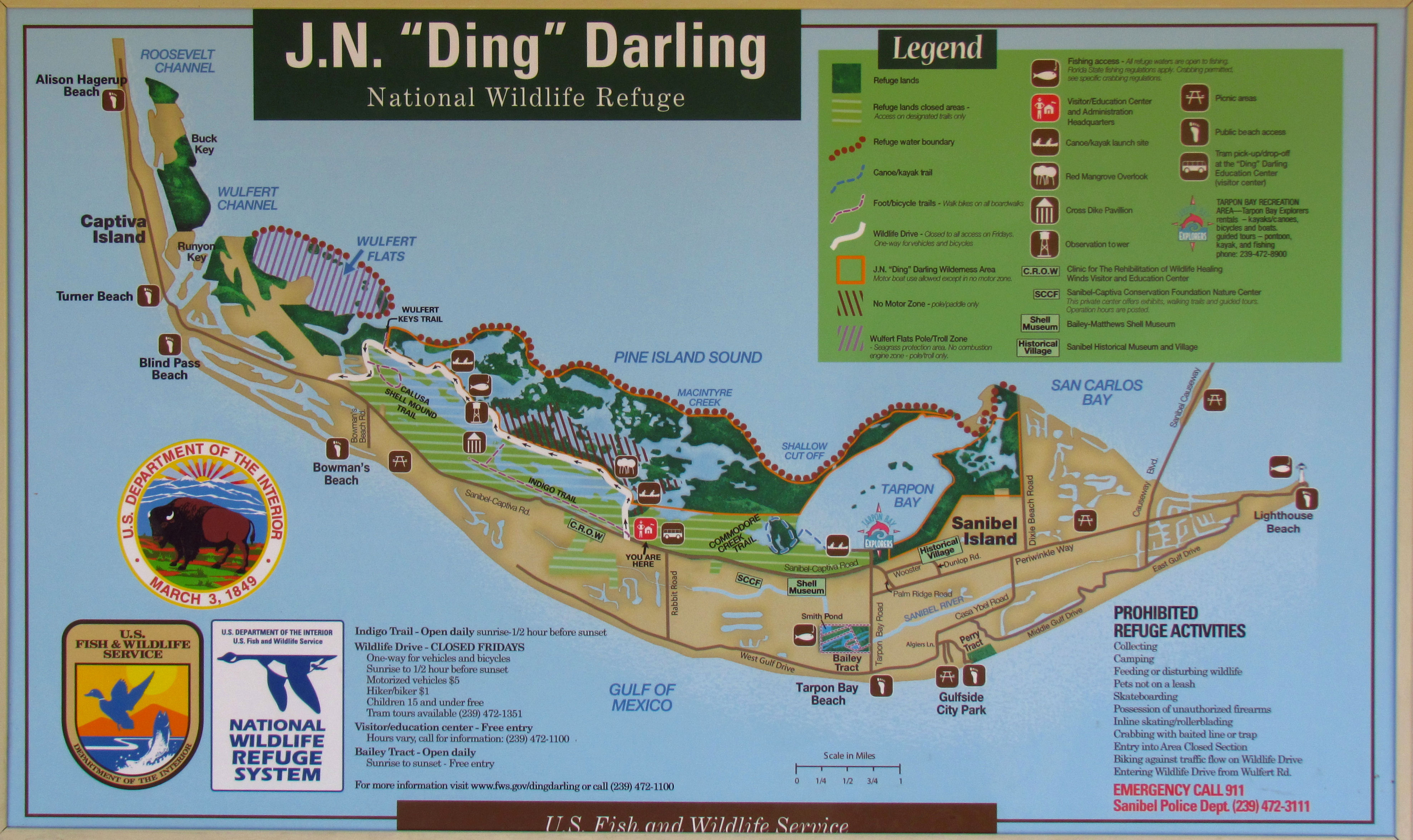
Map of Sanibel Island and refuge
