= Okaloacoochee Slough Wildlife Management Area =

Protected area in Florida, United States

- Location within Florida
- Location: Hendry County, Florida
- Nearest city: Fort Myers
- Coordinates: 26°34′54″N 81°18′5″W
- Area: 8,521 acres (3,448 ha)
- Governing body: Florida Fish and Wildlife Conservation Commission

Okaloacoochee Slough Wildlife Management Area (WMA) protects 2,992 acres of the larger Okaloacoochee Slough ecosystem approximately 30 miles east of Fort Myers in Hendry County, Florida.

== Fauna ==
The wetlands within Okaloacoochee Slough WMA provide habitat for birds such as wood stork, glossy ibis, Florida sandhill crane, egrets, and herons. Eastern indigo snakes, bobcats, and various warblers dwell within the pine uplands here. The crested caracara and swallow-tailed kite can often be seen flying over wet prairies. The property is classified as a dispersal zone for the endangered Florida panther.

== Recreational Activities ==
Sizable populations of white-tailed deer, feral hog, wild turkey, and small game attract hunters to Okaloacoochee Slough WMA. Wildlife viewing on this Great Florida Birding and Wildlife Trail site is popular year-round, with many specialty birds found on the property. Over 40 miles of unpaved roads are used by hikers, horseback riders, and bicyclists. Camping is permitted at two primitive campsites.
