= Floodplain swamp =

Type of Wetland

A floodplain swamp is a swamp habitat in Florida. They occur in areas of flooding and inundation along streams and rivers. They have much in common with strand swamps, found further south where lack of slope prevents stream formation, and host a variety of plant and animal species.
