= Apalachee Wildlife Management Area =

Protected area in Florida, United States

Apalachee Wildlife Management Area (WMA) consists of 7,952 acres of upland longleaf pine and wetland habitat three miles north of Sneads in Jackson County, Florida. The area is broken up into three management zones, all located along Lake Seminole and the Chattahoochee River.

== Flora and fauna ==
High-quality longleaf pine forest here is preferred by species such as Bachman's sparrow, brown-headed nuthatch, gopher tortoise, and Florida pine snake. The upland habitat, interspersed with floodplain forests and marshes, offers prime habitat for both migratory and resident birds. The federally-listed gentian pinkroot grows within Apalachee Wildlife Management Area.

Apalachee Wildlife Management Area (WMA)
- Location within Florida
- Location: Jackson County, Florida
- Nearest city: Sneads, Florida
- Coordinates: 30°48′22″N 84°56′40″W
- Area: 7,952 acres (3,218 ha)
- Governing body: Florida Fish and Wildlife Conservation Commission

== Recreational Activities ==
Hunting is extremely popular here, as some of the largest deer harvested in Florida have come out of this WMA. Furthermore, the Northern bobwhite population is robust due to frequent prescribed burns and abundant cover. Fishing opportunities exist on the backwater sloughs of the Chattahoochee River, WMA ponds, and on Lake Seminole. Bass fishermen recognize Lake Seminole as a largemouth bass and striped bass hotspot.

Apalachee Wildlife Management Area is a site on the Great Florida Birding and Wildlife Trail and its strong wildlife populations attract wildlife viewers year-round. Paddlers utilize four boat landings along River Road to access Lake Seminole and the Chattahoochee River. Hiking, bicycling, and horseback riding is permitted on all unpaved roads.
