= Caloosahatchee National Wildlife Refuge =

United States National Wildlife Refuge in Florida

- IUCN category V (protected landscape/seascape)
- Location within Florida Location within the United States
- Location: North Fort Myers, Florida, United States
- Nearest city: North Fort Myers, Florida
- Coordinates: 26°41′54″N 81°47′50″W
- Area: 40 acres (160,000 m^{2})
- Established: January 1, 1921
- Governing body: US Fish & Wildlife Service
- Website: Caloosahatchee National Wildlife Refuge

The Caloosahatchee National Wildlife Refuge is part of the United States National Wildlife Refuge System, located on the Caloosahatchee River, beneath the I-75 Caloosahatchee Bridge, within the city of North Fort Myers. The 40-acre (160,000 m^{2}) refuge was established on January 1, 1921. It is administered as part of the J. N. "Ding" Darling National Wildlife Refuge Complex.
