= Fort White Wildlife and Environmental Area =

Fort White Wildlife and Environmental Area (WEA) protects 1,610 acres of primarily sandhill habitat four miles west of Fort White in Gilchrist County, Florida.

== Fauna ==
Fort White Wildlife and Environmental Area (WEA)
- Location within Florida
- Location: Gilchrist County, Florida
- Nearest city: Gilchrist County, Florida
- Coordinates: 29°54′31″N 82°46′54″W
- Area: 1,610 acres (650 ha)
- Governing body: Florida Fish and Wildlife Conservation Commission

The imperiled Sherman's fox squirrel, gopher tortoise, Florida mouse, and gopher frog all live in the open sandhills of Fort White WEA. In addition, river otters, beavers, and even manatees may be seen in the adjacent Santa Fe River that flows along the eastern boundary. Birds are represented by numerous migratory and resident species including swallow-tailed kite, barred owl, and Bachman's sparrow.

== Recreational activities ==
Gray squirrel, wild turkey, and white-tailed deer hunting take place here during their respective seasons and bass fishing is popular along the Santa Fe River. Loop trails, both along the river and through the sandhills, permit access to much of the area. Paddlers can access the large bald cypress trees and wildlife-viewing opportunities on the Santa Fe River from a boat ramp located near the parking area on NE 2nd Way.
