= Aucilla Wildlife Management Area =

Wildlife Management Area in Jefferson County, Florida

Aucilla Wildlife Management Area (WMA)
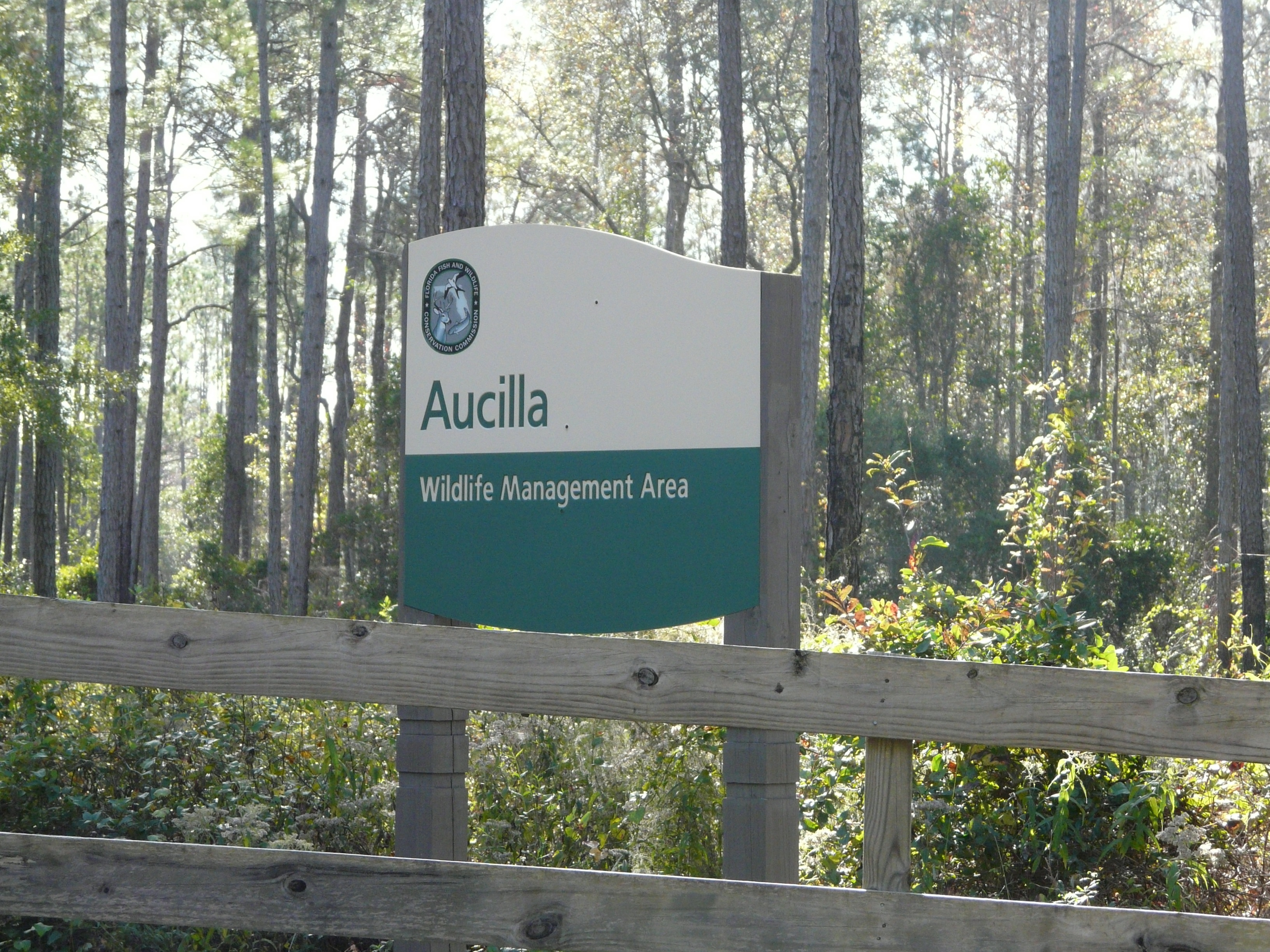
- Entrance sign at Boundary Road

- Location within Florida
- Location: Jefferson County, Florida
- Nearest city: Tallahassee, Florida
- Coordinates: 30°16′31″N 83°59′42″W
- Area: 50,549 acres (20,456 ha)
- Governing body: Florida Fish and Wildlife Conservation Commission

Aucilla Wildlife Management Area conserves 50,549 acres of hydric hammock, mesic flatwoods, upland forest, and spring-run river twelve miles southeast of Tallahassee in Jefferson and Taylor Counties in Florida.

== Fauna ==
The expanse of Aucilla WMA and its diversity of habitats provides a home to many animal species. Mammals range from Florida black bears and bobcats to North American river otters and white-tailed deer. The property is part of the Great Florida Birding and Wildlife Trail due to its abundance of warblers, limpkins, wood storks, and many other migratory and resident bird species. Reptiles and amphibians are represented by species such as eastern diamondback rattlesnakes, gopher tortoises, and American alligators.

== History ==
Evidence of Aucilla Wildlife Management Area's history dates back at least 12,000 years. Bones of prehistoric mammals such as mastodons and giant ground sloths have been found in the Wacissa River, Aucilla River, and sinkhole ponds on the property. Arrow points, pottery, and human remains point to the heavy use of this area by Native Americans over the past several thousand years.

Slaves modified an existing channel that connected the Aucilla and Wacissa Rivers in an attempt from their masters to enhance access to the Gulf of Mexico from northern markets. Seminole Indians hid in the dense swamps during offensive campaigns during the Seminole Wars. In the early 1900s, the area saw increased human use as its old-growth bald cypress and longleaf pine were heavily logged.

== Recreational Activities ==
The size and composition of the Aucilla Wildlife Management Area allow for various recreational activities. The Aucilla and Wacissa Rivers are two of the most popular paddling streams in the Florida Panhandle. The Aucilla River passes karst formations and is considered a more challenging paddle. The clear, spring-fed Wacissa River is more popular with tubers and those seeking a more relaxing paddle.

The Aucilla Sinks Trail and portions of the Florida National Scenic Trail give hikers access to karst features like sinkholes and solution holes. Goose Pasture Campground along the Wacissa River contains several campsites available on a first-come, first-served basis.

The sloughs and rivers of Aucilla WMA contain substantial populations of largemouth bass, Suwannee bass, and bream. Wild turkeys, white-tailed deer, and, especially, feral hogs are abundant in the area, and hunters may pursue them during the appropriate seasons.

== See also ==
Media related to Aucilla Wildlife Management Area at Wikimedia Commons
