= DuPuis Management Area =

Protected area in Florida, US

Coordinates: 26.9722°N 80.5563°W

DuPuis Management Area is a 21,875 acre protected area in northwestern Palm Beach County, Florida and southwestern Martin County, Florida. Recreational opportunities include hunting, horseback riding, cycling, camping, hiking, auto touring, and fishing. During hunting periods it is closed to other use. The property includes a visitor center. Dogs are not allowed on the property. The park includes 22 miles of hiking trails, including a stretch of the Ocean to Lake Trail (a spur of the Florida National Scenic Trail). There is also an equestrian campground and 40 miles of horseback riding trails. The park is located off State Road 76. It is along the Ocean to Lake Trail.

== Habitats ==
Habitats on the property include ponds, wet prairies, cypress domes, pine flatwoods, and remnant Everglades marsh. Its remote location provide a dark night sky well suited for star gazing. Animal species include deer, turkey, quail, bobcat, alligator, hawks, owl, woodpecker, wading birds, bald eagles, sandhill cranes, wood stork, and eastern indigo snakes.

Species inhabiting the property include the federally endangered red cockaded woodpecker which are being reintroduced. There is also a butterfly garden.

== History ==
The ranch land was acquired in 1986, and had been used by Dutch white-belted cattle, sheep and goats. Restoration work was done after it was purchased and linked it up with the J.W. Corbett Wildlife Management Area. The area is named for John G. and Susan H. DuPuis Jr.

== Hunting ==
Hunting seasons include a period for muzzleloading, mobility impaired, general, wild hog, small game, spring turkey, and archery. The property is closed to everyone except those participating in the hunt for all hunting dates except Small Game Season and Wild Hog Still hunts.

== Camping ==
There are three campgrounds located in the area - equestrian, family and group. There are also 3 primitive campsites located along the loop hiking trails (no permit is required for the hiking trail campsites). A no-cost Special Use License permit is required for camping. Permits are obtained online from the South Florida Water Management Districts' Recreation page. sfwmd.gov/sul The Family and Group Campgrounds are gated and have a combination lock. Gates must be closed and locked upon entering and exiting. The Equestrian Campground is gated but does not have a combination lock. The gate should be closed upon entering and exiting. Camping is limited to 8 consecutive days at a time and campers must vacate the property for one full day before an additional license can be obtained. Visitors are limited to 30 days of camping per year District-wide. The DuPuis campgrounds do not have electric or water hook ups. Quiet hours must be observed in all campgrounds between 11 pm and 7 am.

In the family campground there are 14 primitive campsites that surround a lake. There are two solar powered composting toilets (limited supplies furnished) and a shared single hose bib of potable water. Only tents and pop-up campers allowed. Some sites have fire rings and picnic tables. Generator use is not permitted in this campground. sfwmd.gov/sul

The group campground is for group camping and includes two picnic table pavilions, portable toilets, and a non-potable well with pitcher pump. This site is for groups of at least 8 and up to 25. There are two permits available per day. This site allows only tents or pop up campers. Generator use is not permitted in this campground. Camping also requires a Special Use License. sfwmd.gov/sul

The equestrian campground is for people who need accommodations for horses and trailers. It is open to all users and is the only campsite at DuPuis that allows RV's/travel trailers and horse rigs. Amenities at this campground include a bath house with hot showers and flushing toilets, potable water and a dump station. Generator use is permitted in this campground but may not be in use during quiet hours between 11 pm and 7 am. Strictly enforced. As of July 2016, a Special Use License is required to camp. sfwmd.gov/sul

The loop trail campsites are only accessible by hiking in on foot.

Off-road motor vehicles, such as ATV's and dirt bikes, are not allowed on the property. Only registered licensed vehicles are permitted and may only be operated on the named grades at DuPuis. No vehicle permit is required to access the named grades at DuPuis.

The property is closed during specific hunts dates during the Fall and Spring to all except those participating in the hunt. Please check for hunt closure dates at myfwc.com/hunting/wma-brochures or on the South Florida Water Management District Recreation website. sfwmd.gov/recreation.

Dogs are now allowed in the campgrounds as long as they are restrained and under the control of the owner at all times. Pet waste must be picked up and disposed of properly. The current permits have camping rules attached and the latest one shows "Dogs must be on a leash and under control within camping areas. Please consult the FWC hunting brochure regarding rules and regulations for hunting with dogs." Please take the time to read through these rules and information.
