= Christ Episcopal Church =

Christ Episcopal Church may refer to:

== Alabama ==
- Christ Episcopal Church (Tuscaloosa, Alabama), a historic church building in Tuscaloosa

== California ==
- Christ Episcopal Church (Coronado, California), a church whose construction was funded by Charles T. Hinde

== Colorado ==
- Christ Episcopal Church (Cañon City, Colorado)

== Connecticut ==
- Christ Episcopal Church (Bethlehem, Connecticut)
- Christ Episcopal Church (Ansonia, Connecticut), in Ansonia, Connecticut

== Delaware ==
- Christ Church, Milford, Delaware

== Florida ==
- Christ Episcopal Church (Monticello, Florida), a historic Carpenter Gothic styled architecture Episcopal church

== Georgia ==
- Christ Episcopal Church (Macon, Georgia)
- Christ Church (Savannah, Georgia)
- Christ Church (St. Simons, Georgia)

== Illinois ==
- Christ Episcopal Church (Joliet, Illinois), an 1884 historic building and former church in Will County
- Christ Episcopal Church (Springfield, Illinois)
- Christ Episcopal Church (Waukegan, Illinois), an active parish with a landmarked 1888 building in Lake County

== Iowa ==
- Christ Episcopal Church (Burlington, Iowa), a historic church building

== Kentucky ==
- Christ Episcopal Church (Elizabethtown, Kentucky)
- Christ Church Cathedral (Lexington, Kentucky)

== Louisiana ==
- Christ Episcopal Church (Covington, Louisiana), a historic church in St. Tammany Parish
- Christ Episcopal Church (Bastrop, Louisiana)
- Christ Episcopal Church and Cemetery (Napoleonville, Louisiana)

== Maine ==
- Christ Episcopal Church (Gardiner, Maine), an 1820 historic church

== Maryland ==
- Christ Episcopal Church (Accokeek, Maryland), in Accokeek, Maryland
- Christ Episcopal Church (Baltimore, Maryland), a church where Francis L. Hawks preached
- Christ Episcopal Church and Cemetery (Cambridge, Maryland), an 1883 historic Episcopal church and cemetery in Dorchester County
- Christ Episcopal Church (Chaptico, Maryland), a 1736 historic church in St. Mary's County
- Christ Church (Easton, Maryland), an 1840 historic church in the Episcopal Diocese of Easton
- Christ Episcopal Church (Rockville, Maryland), in the Episcopal Diocese of Washington

== Massachusetts ==
- Christ Church Episcopal (Fitchburg, Massachusetts), an 1867 church built by architect Richard Upjohn
- Christ Episcopal Church (Medway, Massachusetts), after which the Grace Episcopal Church in Jamestown, North Dakota was modeled
- Christ Episcopal Church (Waltham, Massachusetts), a historic Episcopal church

== Minnesota ==
- Christ Episcopal Church (Benson, Minnesota)
- Christ Episcopal Church (Red Wing, Minnesota), a church founded in 1858 in Red Wing

== Missouri ==
- Christ Episcopal Church (Springfield, Missouri)

== Montana ==
- Christ Episcopal Church and Rectory (Sheridan, Montana)

== Nebraska ==
- Christ Church Episcopal (Beatrice, Nebraska)
- Christ Episcopal Church (Sidney, Nebraska)

== New Jersey ==
- Christ Episcopal Church (New Brunswick, New Jersey), an 1803 historic church

== New York ==
- Christ Episcopal Church (Belvidere, New York), a historic Episcopal church in Allegany County
- Christ Episcopal Church (Corning, New York), of which Bennett Sims was a rector
- Christ Episcopal Church (Duanesburg, New York), a 1793 historic church on NY 20 in Schenectady County
- Christ Church New Brighton (Episcopal), in New Brighton, Staten Island
- Christ Episcopal Church (Tarrytown, New York), an 1837 historic Episcopal church
- Christ Episcopal Church (Walton, New York), an 1834 historic Episcopal church building in Delaware County
- Christ Episcopal Church (Wellsburg, New York), built in 1869
- Christ Episcopal Church (Marlboro, New York)

== North Carolina ==
- Christ Episcopal Church (Raleigh, North Carolina), an 1848 Episcopal church
- Christ Episcopal Church and Parish House (New Bern, North Carolina)
- Christ Episcopal Church (Walnut Cove, North Carolina)
- Christ Episcopal Church (Cleveland, North Carolina)

== Ohio ==
- Christ Episcopal Church (Huron, Ohio), a historic Episcopal church
- Christ Episcopal Church (Oberlin, Ohio)

== Pennsylvania ==
- Christ Church (Brownsville, Pennsylvania), historic church built in 1857, features a Tiffany glass window
- Christ's Church (Greensburg, Pennsylvania), historic church built in 1891, features a Tiffany glass window
- Christ Episcopal Church (Reading, Pennsylvania), founded in 1762, is the oldest English-speaking congregation in Reading
- Christ Episcopal Church (Stroudsburg, Pennsylvania), a church in Stroudsburg, founded in 1897
- Christ Episcopal Church (Williamsport, Pennsylvania), a historical church in Williamsport

== Rhode Island ==
- Christ Episcopal Church (Providence, Rhode Island), a historic Episcopal church

== South Carolina ==
- Christ Church (Florence, South Carolina)

== Tennessee ==
- Christ Episcopal Church (South Pittsburg, Tennessee)
- Christ Church Episcopal (Rugby, Tennessee), a contributing property, historic district Rugby Colony in Rugby
- Christ Episcopal Church (Tracy City, Tennessee), listed on the NRHP in Grundy County

== Texas ==
- Christ Episcopal Church (Matagorda, Texas), listed on the N.R.H.P. in Matagorda County

== Vermont ==
- Christ Episcopal Church (Montpelier, Vermont), an 1840 historic church

== Virginia ==
- Christ Episcopal Church (Big Stone Gap, Virginia), a historic church**
- Christ Episcopal Church (Lancaster County, Virginia), a historic church
- Christ Church (Norfolk, Virginia), now demolished, where bishop Thomas Atkinson served
- Christ and Grace Episcopal Church (Petersburg, Virginia), a historic church
- Christ Church (Saluda, Virginia), a historic church
- Christ Episcopal Church (Winchester, Virginia), a historic church

== Washington ==
- Christ Episcopal Church (Puyallup, Washington)

== Washington, D.C. ==
- Christ Church (Georgetown, Washington, D.C.)
- Christ Church, Washington Parish

== Wisconsin ==
- Christ Episcopal Church (La Crosse, Wisconsin), a historic Episcopal church in the Episcopal Diocese of Eau Claire
- Christ Episcopal Church (Bayfield, Wisconsin)

== Wyoming ==
- Christ Episcopal Church and Rectory (Douglas, Wyoming)

== See also ==
- Christ Church (disambiguation)
- Episcopal Church (United States)
