= National Register of Historic Places listings in Cheyenne County, Nebraska =

Location of Cheyenne County in Nebraska

Cheyenne County, Nebraska, United States, has 11 properties and districts listed on the National Register of Historic Places.

The locations of National Register properties and districts for which the latitude and longitude coordinates are included below may be seen in a map.

This National Park Service list is complete through NPS recent listings posted October 30, 2026.

== Listings county-wide ==
	Name on the Register	Image	Date listed	Location	City or town	Description
1	Christ Episcopal Church	Christ Episcopal Church	October 21, 1994 (#94001232)	Junction of 10th Ave. and Linden St. 41°08′30″N 102°58′32″W	Sidney	
2	Deadwood Draw	Deadwood Draw	November 12, 1992 (#92001574)	Northwest of Sidney; 41°09′35″N 103°00′28″W	Sidney	
3	Fort Sidney Historic District	Fort Sidney Historic District	March 28, 1973 (#73001056)	Roughly bounded by 6th and 5th Aves., Linden and Jackson; 41°08′35″N 102°58′10″W	Sidney	
4	Daniel and Sarah Herboldsheimer Ranch	Daniel and Sarah Herboldsheimer Ranch	April 5, 1990 (#90000566)	Northeast of Potter; 41°16′44″N 103°13′26″W	Potter	
5	Lodgepole Opera House	Lodgepole Opera House	July 7, 1988 (#88000947)	Western side of Oberfelder at Front; 41°08′52″N 102°38′22″W	Lodgepole	
6	Sidney Carnegie Library	Sidney Carnegie Library	July 3, 1991 (#91000838)	740 Illinois St. 41°08′43″N 102°58′26″W	Sidney	
7	Sidney Historic Business District	Sidney Historic Business District	October 21, 1994 (#94001233)	Roughly bounded by Hickory and King Sts. and 9th and 11th Aves.; also roughly bounded by Hickory and King Sts. and 9th and 12th Aves. 41°08′40″N 96°58′34″W	Sidney	Second set of addresses represents a boundary increase
8	Sioux Ordnance Depot Fire & Guard Headquarters	Sioux Ordnance Depot Fire & Guard Headquarters	October 24, 1994 (#94001234)	Junction of 1st Ave. and Military Rd. at Western Nebraska Community College; 41°12′52″N 103°06′14″W	Sidney	
9	Wes Stevens Site		August 28, 1973 (#73001055)	Address Restricted	Potter	
10	Water Holes Ranch	Water Holes Ranch	November 12, 1992 (#92001575)	Roughly 7.5 miles west of Gurley; 41°18′23″N 103°06′52″W	Gurley	
11	Wild Horse Draw-Leeman's Springs Archeological District		July 12, 2006 (#06000556)	Address Restricted	Sidney	

== Former listing ==
	Name on the Register	Image	Date listed	Date removed	Location	City or town	Description
1	Brownson Viaduct	Brownson Viaduct	June 29, 1992 (#92000747)	December 31, 2013	Spur 17A over U.S. Route 30 and Union Pacific tracks, 0.8 miles northwest of Brownson; 41°11′22″N 103°07′17″W	Brownson	Demolished in 2000 and replaced by a modern concrete beam bridge: see photo

== See also ==
- List of National Historic Landmarks in Nebraska
- National Register of Historic Places listings in Nebraska
