= Jefferson County Courthouse =

Jefferson County Courthouse or variation prefaced with Old may refer to:

- Jefferson County Courthouse (Bessemer, Alabama), a contributing building in the Downtown Bessemer Historic District, listed on the National Register of Historic Places (NRHP)
- Jefferson County Courthouse (Birmingham, Alabama)
- Jefferson County Courthouse (Arkansas), Pine Bluff, Arkansas, a contributing building in the NRHP-listed Pine Bluff Commercial Historic District
- Jefferson County Courthouse (Florida), Monticello, Florida, a contributing building in the NRHP-listed Monticello Historic District
- Jefferson County Courthouse (Georgia), Louisville, Georgia, NRHP-listed
- Jefferson County Courthouse (Idaho), Rigby, Idaho, NRHP-listed
- Jefferson County Courthouse (Illinois)
- Jefferson County Courthouse (Iowa), NRHP-listed
- Jefferson County Courthouse (Kansas), Oskaloosa, Kansas
- Louisville Metro Hall, formerly known as Jefferson County Courthouse, in Louisville, Kentucky
- Jefferson County Courthouse Annex, Louisville, Kentucky
- Old Jefferson Parish Courthouse, Gretna, Louisiana, NRHP-listed
- Jefferson County Courthouse (Mississippi), designed by architect of Pointe Coupee Parish Courthouse
- Jefferson County Courthouse (Montana), Boulder, Montana, NRHP-listed
- Jefferson County Courthouse (Nebraska), Fairbury, Nebraska, NRHP-listed
- Jefferson County Courthouse Complex, Watertown, New York, NRHP-listed
- Jefferson County Courthouse (Ohio), Steubenville, Ohio
- Jefferson County Courthouse (Oklahoma), Waurika, Oklahoma, NRHP-listed
- Jefferson County Courthouse (Texas), Beaumont, Texas, NRHP-listed
- Jefferson County Courthouse (Washington), Port Townsend, Washington, NRHP-listed
- Jefferson County Courthouse (West Virginia), Charles Town, West Virginia, NRHP-listed
