= Lodgepole Opera House =

Historic building in Lodgepole, Nebraska

- U.S. National Register of Historic Places
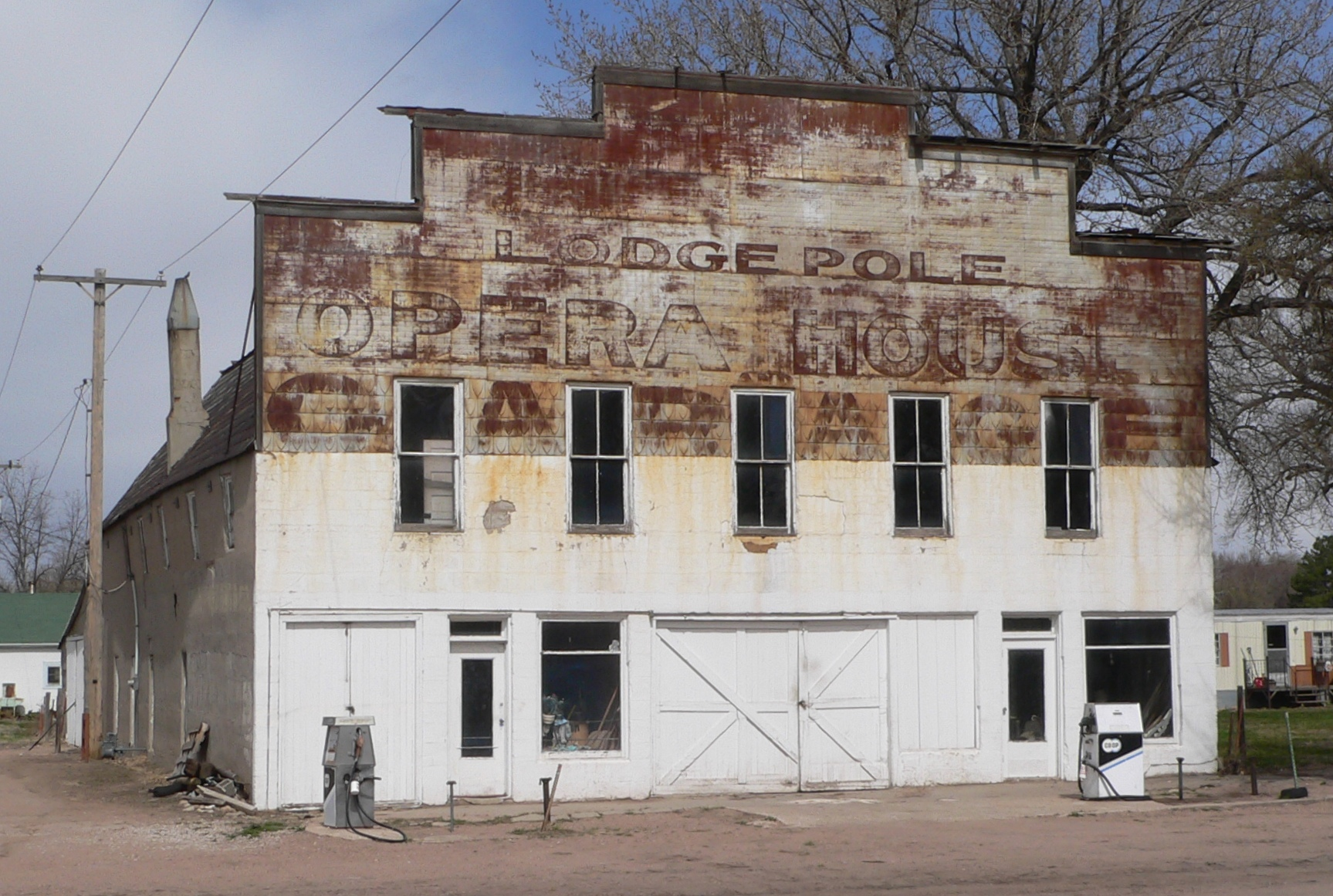
- The building in 2011

- Location within Nebraska Location within the United States
- Location: W side of Oberfelder at Front, Lodgepole, Nebraska
- Coordinates: 41°08′52″N 102°38′19″W
- Area: less than one acre
- Built: 1911
- Built by: Frank Isenberger
- Architectural style: One-part commercial block
- MPS: Opera House Buildings in Nebraska 1867-1917 MPS
- NRHP reference No.: 88000947
- Added to NRHP: July 7, 1988

The Lodgepole Opera House is a historic building in Lodgepole, Nebraska. It was built by Frank Isenberger in 1911. Besides the performing arts, it hosted basketball games and events for organizations like the YMCA, the Commercial Club and the Ladies' Aid Society. The building was called "an ornament to the city" by the Lodge Pole Express in 1911. It has been listed on the National Register of Historic Places since July 7, 1988.
