= Christ Episcopal Church (Huron, Ohio) =

Historic church in Ohio, United States

- U.S. National Register of Historic Places
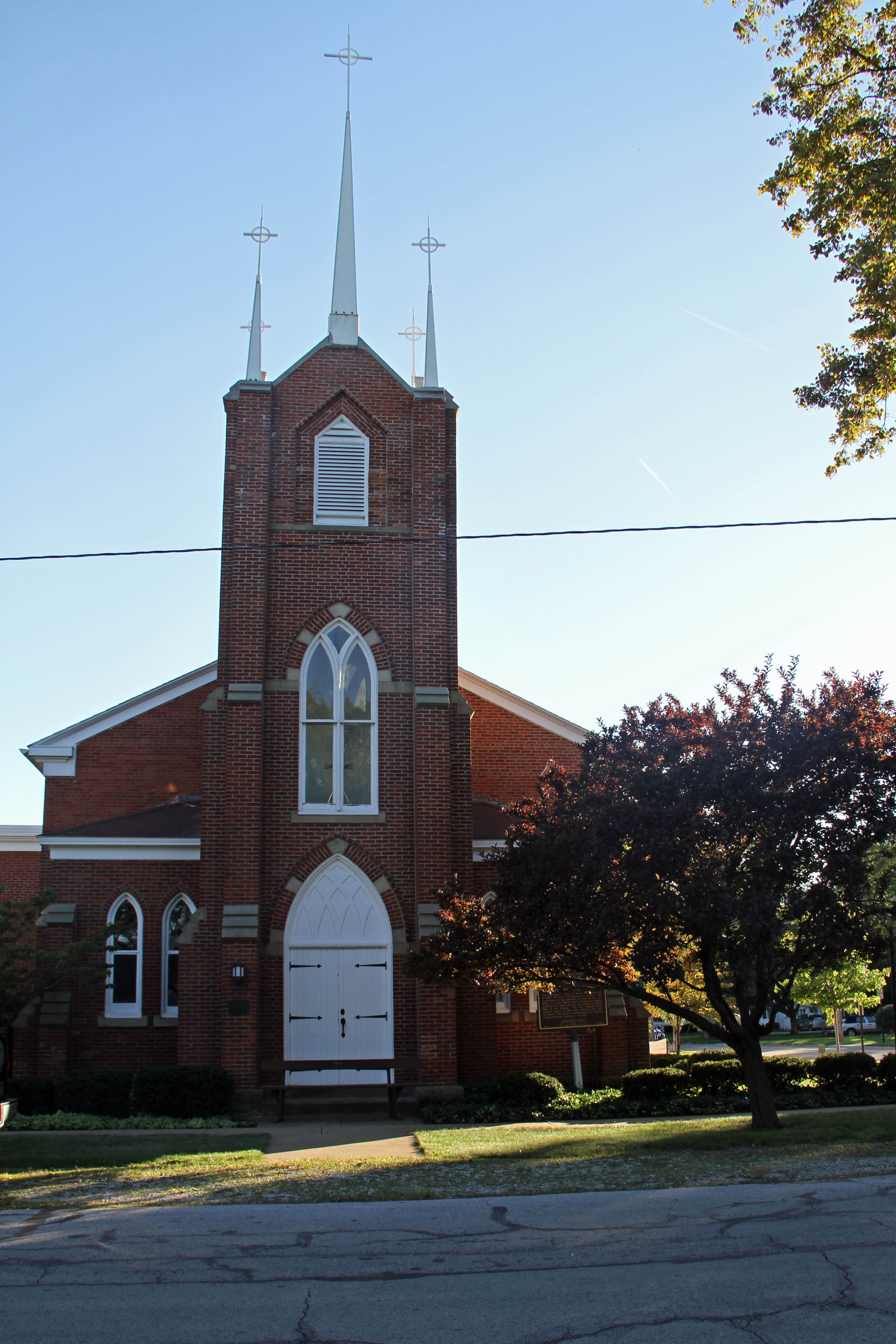

- Location within Ohio Location within the United States
- Location: 120 Ohio Street; Huron, Ohio
- Coordinates: 41°23′45″N 82°33′18″W
- Built: 1839
- NRHP reference No.: 75001379
- Added to NRHP: March 4, 1975

Christ Episcopal Church is a historic Episcopal church located at 120 Ohio Street in Huron, Ohio, in the United States. On March 4, 1975, it was added to the National Register of Historic Places.

== History ==
Christ Episcopal Church was organized in 1837 and its church building dates from 1838.

== Current use ==
Christ Episcopal Church is an active parish in the Episcopal Diocese of Ohio.

In 2023, the church reported 285 members. No membership statistics were reported in 2024 national parochial reports. Plate and pledge financial support reported by the church in 2024 was $190,738. Average Sunday Attendance (ASA) reported in 2024 was 41 persons. This was a relative decrease on ASA of 55 in 2019.

== See also ==
- List of Registered Historic Places in Erie County, Ohio
- Christ Episcopal Church (disambiguation)
