= Christ Episcopal Church (Stroudsburg, Pennsylvania) =

Church in Stroudsburg, Pennsylvania, United States

- Location within Pennsylvania Location within the United States
- 40.9877°N 75.1957°W
- Location: 205 North Seventh Street; Stroudsburg, Pennsylvania
- Country: United States
- Denomination: Episcopalian
- Website: christchurchstroudsburg.org

History
- Founded: 1897

Architecture
- Years built: 1904–1905
- Completed: November 21, 1905

Christ Episcopal Church is a parish of the Episcopal Diocese of the Susquehanna (formerly Bethlehem) in Stroudsburg, Pennsylvania. It was founded in 1897 in a private residence in East Stroudsburg. The cornerstone for the current church building was laid on June 8, 1904, and the church was consecrated on November 21, 1905. In 2025 the parish reported ASA of 47 and income of $125,891. This was a decrease from ASA of 108 reported in 2017 and income of $191,703 reported in 2020.

== Clergy ==
- The Ven. Reginald Shield Radcliffe (Archdeacon, 1903)
- The Rev. Thomas Shoesmith (1927-1956)
- The Rev. Charles A. "Arch" Park (1956-1985)
- The Rev. Michael Newman (1986-1992)
- The Rev. Elizabeth "Penny" Moulton (1992-1997)
- The Rev. Joseph DeAcetis (1998-2000)
- The Rev. Elizabeth Haynes (2001-2010)
- The Rev. J. Douglas Moyer (2011-2021)
- The Rev. Bruce Gowe (2022-2025)
- The Rev. Dr. Sidnie White Crawford (2025)
- The Rev. Bill Martin (current priest-in-charge)

== Notable parishioners ==
- Montgomery Fletcher Crowe, Pennsylvania State senator
- Peter Roche de Coppens, Swiss sociologist and East Stroudsburg University professor
- Kenneth Bernard Schade, East Stroudsburg University professor, founder of the Singing Boys of Pennsylvania
