= Sidney Public Library =

Public library in Sidney, Nebraska, U.S.

- 41.14246134797428°N 102.97949333094526°W
- Location: 1112 12th Ave., Sidney, Nebraska, U.S.
- Type: Public library
- Established: 1966; 60 years ago

Collection
- Size: 34,387

Access and use
- Members: 3,929

Other information
- Website: sidneypubliclibrary.org

- Sidney Carnegie Library
- U.S. National Register of Historic Places
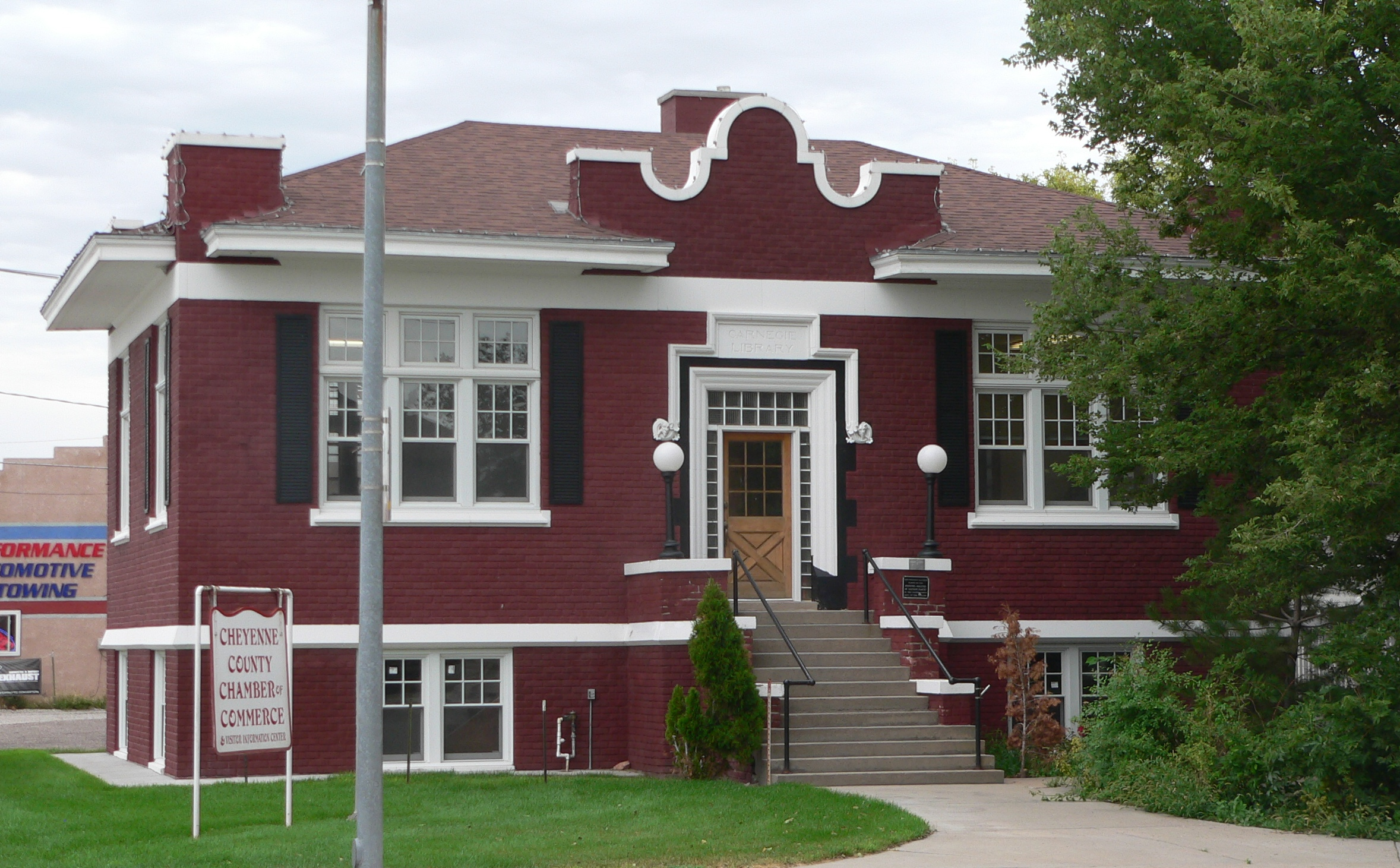
- Sidney Carnegie Library in 2010
- Location: 740 Illinois Street, Sidney, Nebraska, U.S.
- Coordinates: 41°08′43″N 102°58′25″W
- Area: 0.3 acres (0.12 ha)
- Built: 1917
- Architectural style: Tudor Revival
- MPS: Carnegie Libraries in Nebraska MPS
- NRHP reference No.: 91000838
- Added to NRHP: July 3, 1991

Sidney Public Library is a public library located in Sidney, Nebraska. It was built in 1913, following a $6,500 donation from the Carnegie Corporation, and it opened to the public in 1917. Designed in the Tudor Revival architectural style, including a grotesque on each side of the main entrance, it was one of only 46 Carnegie libraries in Nebraska, and it was the first library in Cheyenne County.

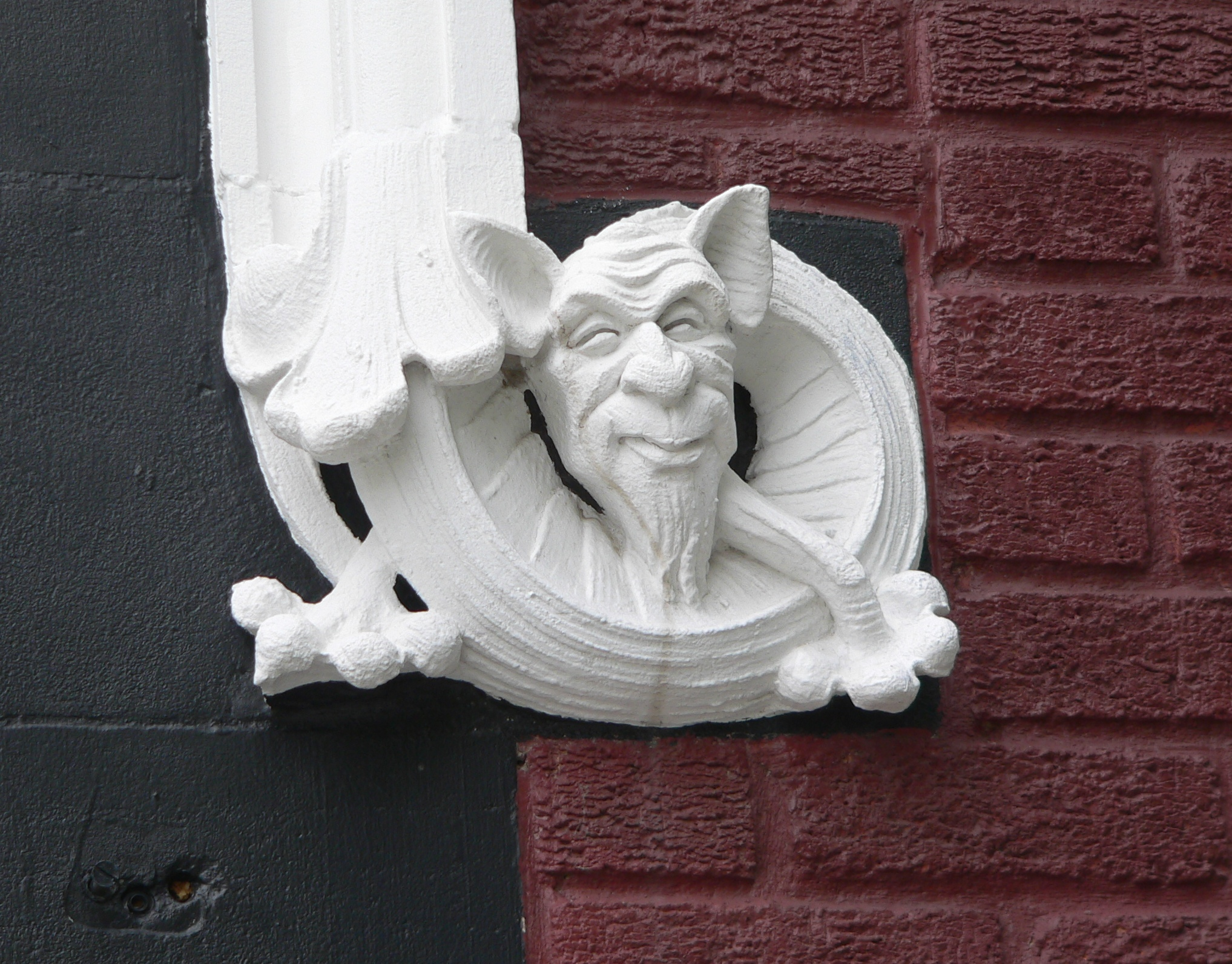
The grotesque on the east side of the main entrance.

In 1966, the library was moved to a different building and the Cheyenne County Chamber of Commerce took over the original structure,

On July 3, 1991 it was added to the National Register of Historic Places.
