= Jefferson County Courthouse (Birmingham, Alabama) =

- U.S. National Register of Historic Places
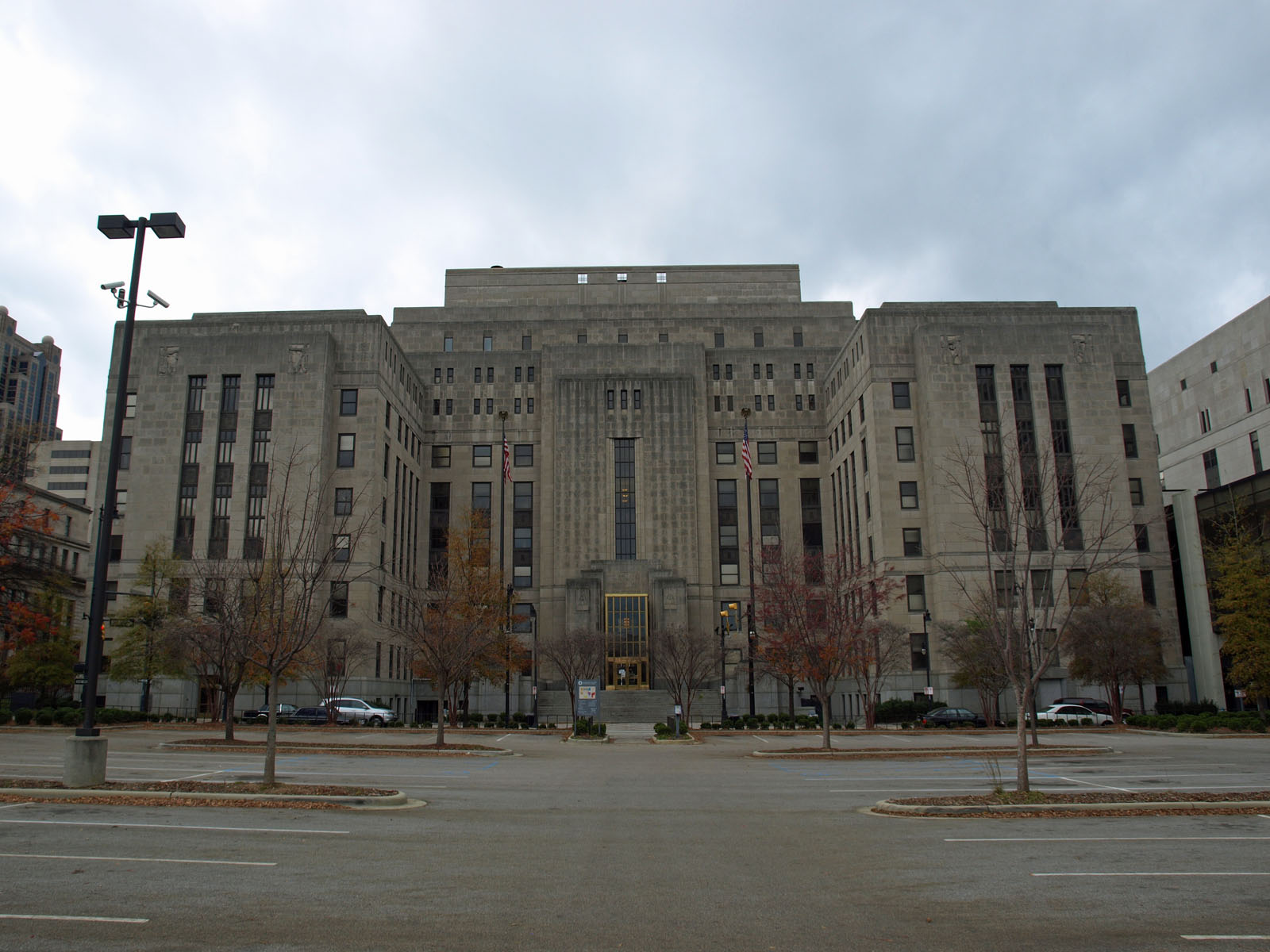
- The courthouse in November 2011

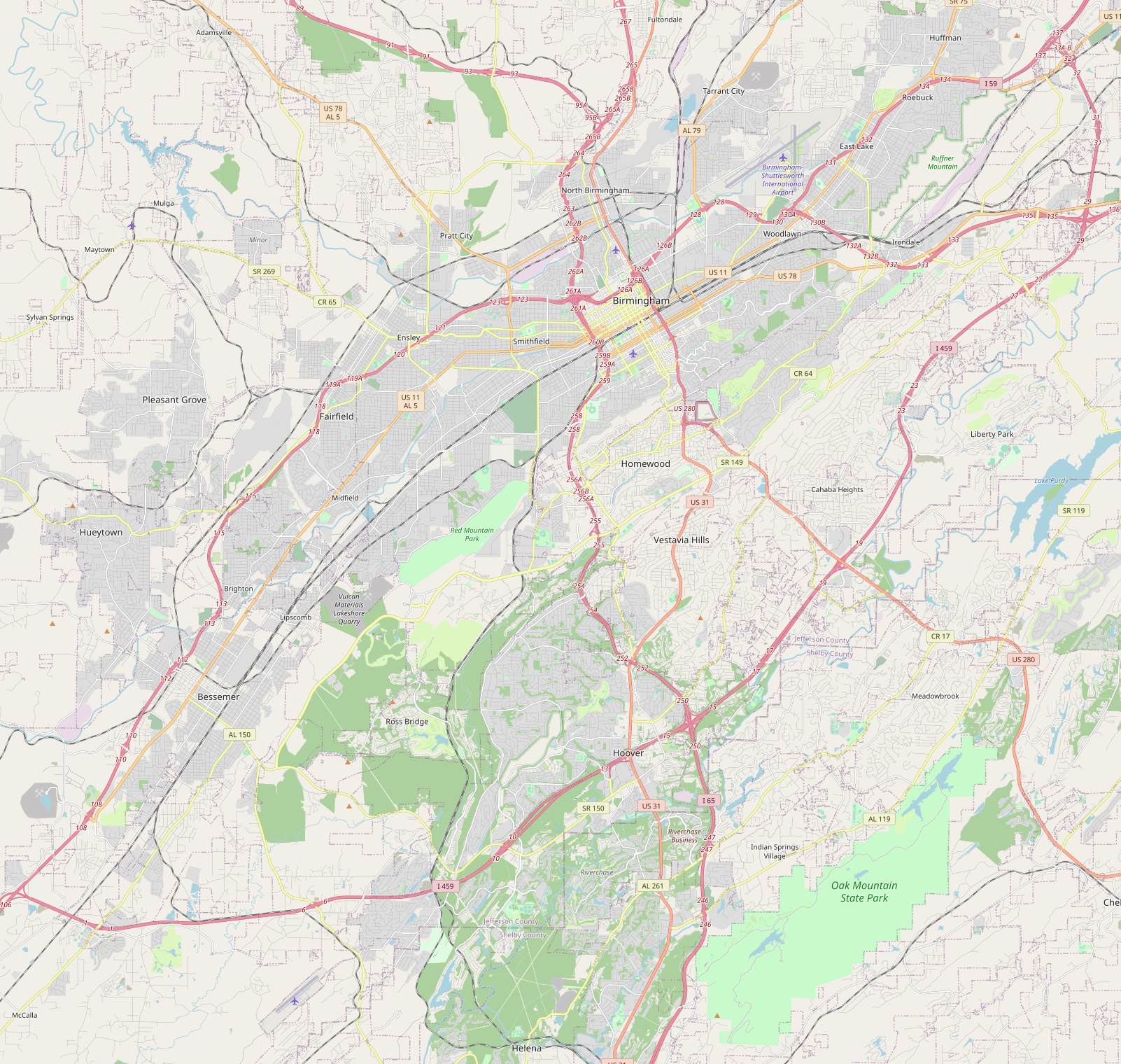
- Location within Birmingham, Alabama Location within Alabama Location within the United States
- Location: 716 21st St., N, Birmingham, Alabama
- Coordinates: 33°31′16″N 86°48′32″W
- Area: 2.3 acres (0.93 ha)
- Built: 1929–1932
- Architect: Holabird and Root
- Architectural style: Art Deco
- NRHP reference No.: 82001606
- Added to NRHP: December 27, 1982

The Jefferson County Courthouse in Birmingham, Alabama is the main county courthouse of Jefferson County, Alabama. It is the county's sixth main courthouse building, and the third in Birmingham. The cornerstone was laid in 1929, and the building was completed in 1932. The prior courthouse was demolished in 1937. The new courthouse was added to the National Register of Historic Places in 1982.

== History ==
It was designed by Chicago architectural firm Holabird & Root, a very prominent Chicago firm that designed several early skyscrapers, Soldier Field, among many other great structures.

The courthouse's Art Deco design features limestone bas relief panels by sculptor Leo Friedlander depicting local history and the city's industrial influences, and also includes geometric designs resembling swastikas. The lobby interior features large-scale painted murals by John W. Norton contrasting the "Old South" to the "New South."

The courthouse adjoins the Birmingham Public Library on the east side of Linn Park. It faces across to Birmingham's City Hall, which was completed in 1950. Other public buildings around the park, which serves as a "municipal plaza," include Boutwell Auditorium, the Birmingham Museum of Art and the Birmingham Board of Education Building.

An International style annex, also dressed in limestone, was built in 1963–64.

== See also ==
- Jefferson County Courthouse, in Bessemer, Alabama, the other active county court facility in 2019. Built in 1919, it is also listed on the National Register, as part of the Downtown Bessemer Historic District.
