= Monticello Historic District (Monticello, Florida) =

Historic district in Florida, United States

- U.S. National Register of Historic Places
- U.S. Historic district
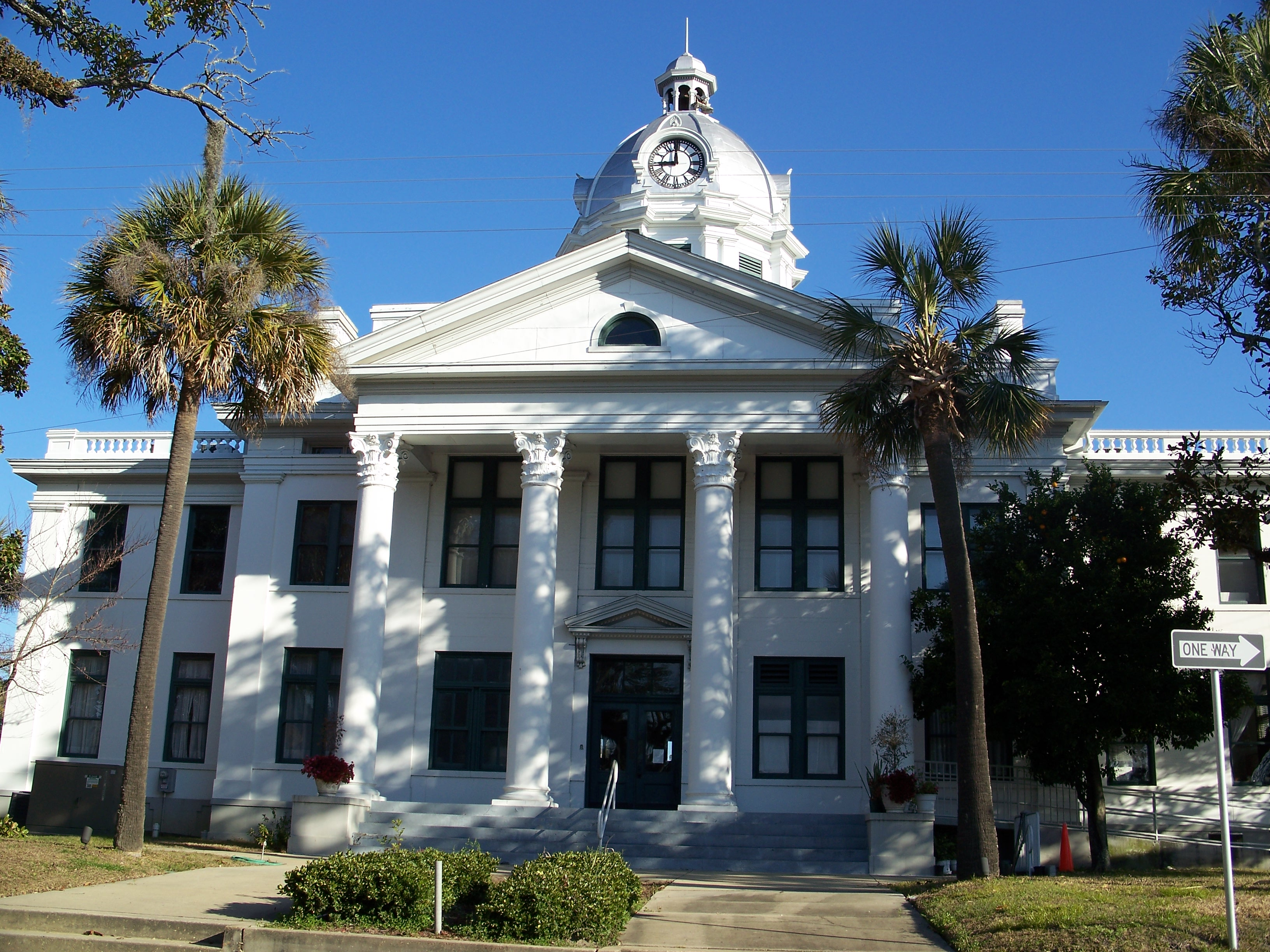
- The Jefferson County Courthouse, part of the district

- Location within Florida Location within the United States
- Location: Monticello, Florida
- Coordinates: 30°32′43″N 83°52′5″W
- Area: 3,000 acres (1,200 ha)
- Built: 1828-c. 1900
- Architectural style: Frame Vernacular, Victorian, Classical Revival, Romanesque Revival, Greek Revival, Italianate, Stick-Eastlake
- NRHP reference No.: 77000405
- Added to NRHP: August 19, 1977

The Monticello Historic District is a U.S. Historic District (designated as such on August 19, 1977) located in Monticello, Florida. The district includes an irregular area along Madison, Jefferson, Dogwood, and Washington Streets and contains 41 historic buildings.

Contributing properties in the district include:

- Christ Episcopal Church (Monticello, Florida)
- First Presbyterian Church (Monticello, Florida)
- Jefferson County Courthouse (Florida)
- Perkins Opera House
- Wirick-Simmons House
