= Christ Episcopal Church (Monticello, Florida) =

- U.S. Historic district – Contributing property
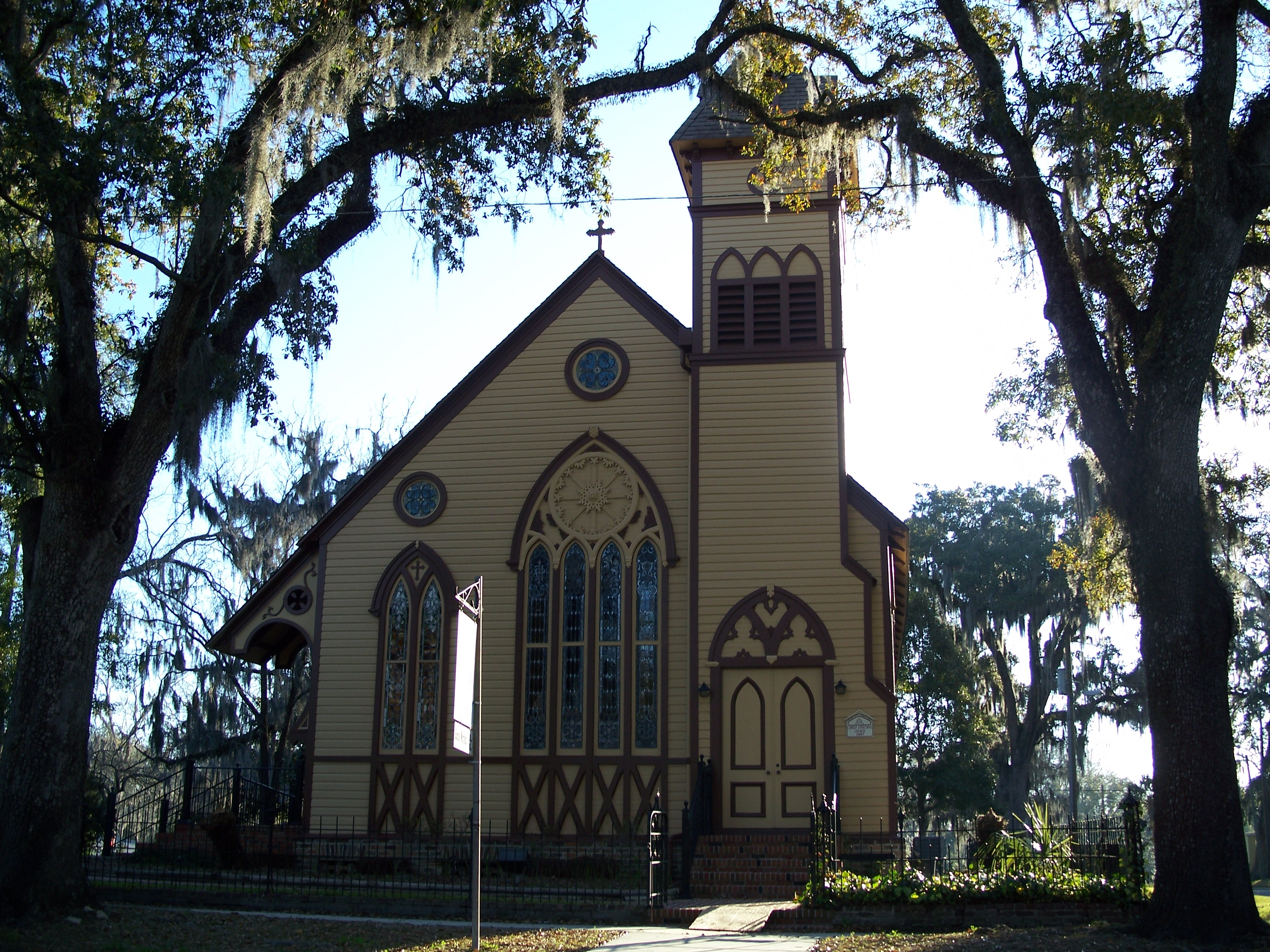
- Church in February 2010

- Location within Florida Location within the United States
- Location: 425 North Cherry Street, Monticello, Florida
- Built: 1885
- Architect: T.M. Ferguson;
- Architectural style: Carpenter Gothic
- Part of: Monticello Historic District (ID77000405)

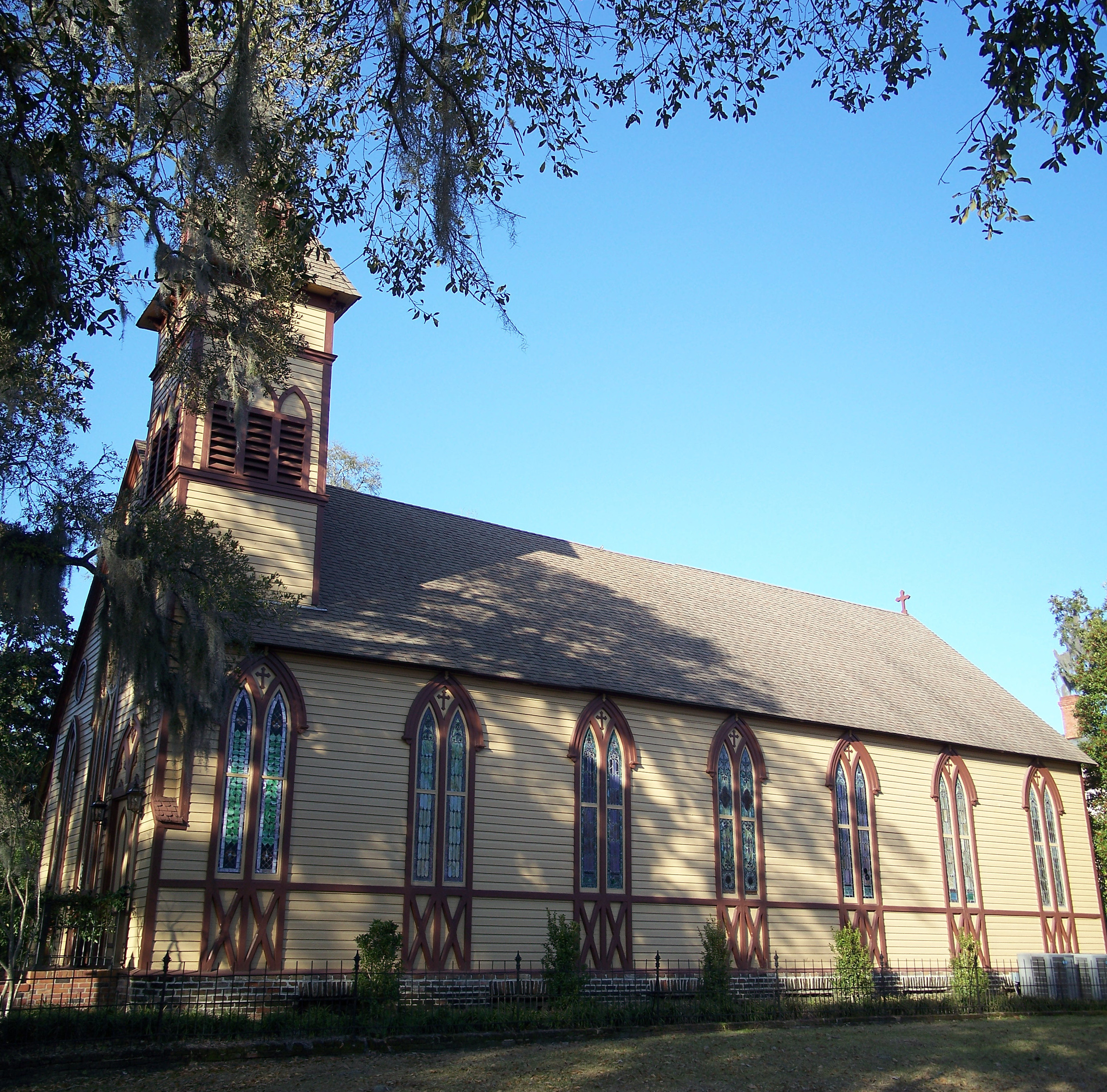
church sanctuary

Christ Episcopal Church is an historic Carpenter Gothic Episcopal church located at 425 North Cherry Street in Monticello, Florida in the United States. Designed by G.M. Torgerson, a Swede, in the Carpenter Gothic style of architecture with some stick-style detailing, it was built in 1885 to replace a previous church building which burned in 1883. Its steep roof, lancet windows and side belfry and entrance are typical of Carpenter Gothic churches. The church had been organized in 1840 by local Episcopalians who had previously held lay services in their homes. It is still an active parish in the Episcopal Diocese of Florida.

The building is a contributing property in the Monticello Historic District, which was added to the National Register of Historic Places on August 19, 1977.

In 1989, Christ Episcopal Church was listed in A Guide to Florida's Historic Architecture, published by the University of Florida Press.

Christ Episcopal Church was also featured in the 2009 Historic Episcopal Churches Engagement Calendar published by the National Episcopal Historians and Archivists.

== See also ==
- Christ Episcopal Church (disambiguation)
