= Jefferson County Courthouse (Florida) =

- U.S. Historic district – Contributing property
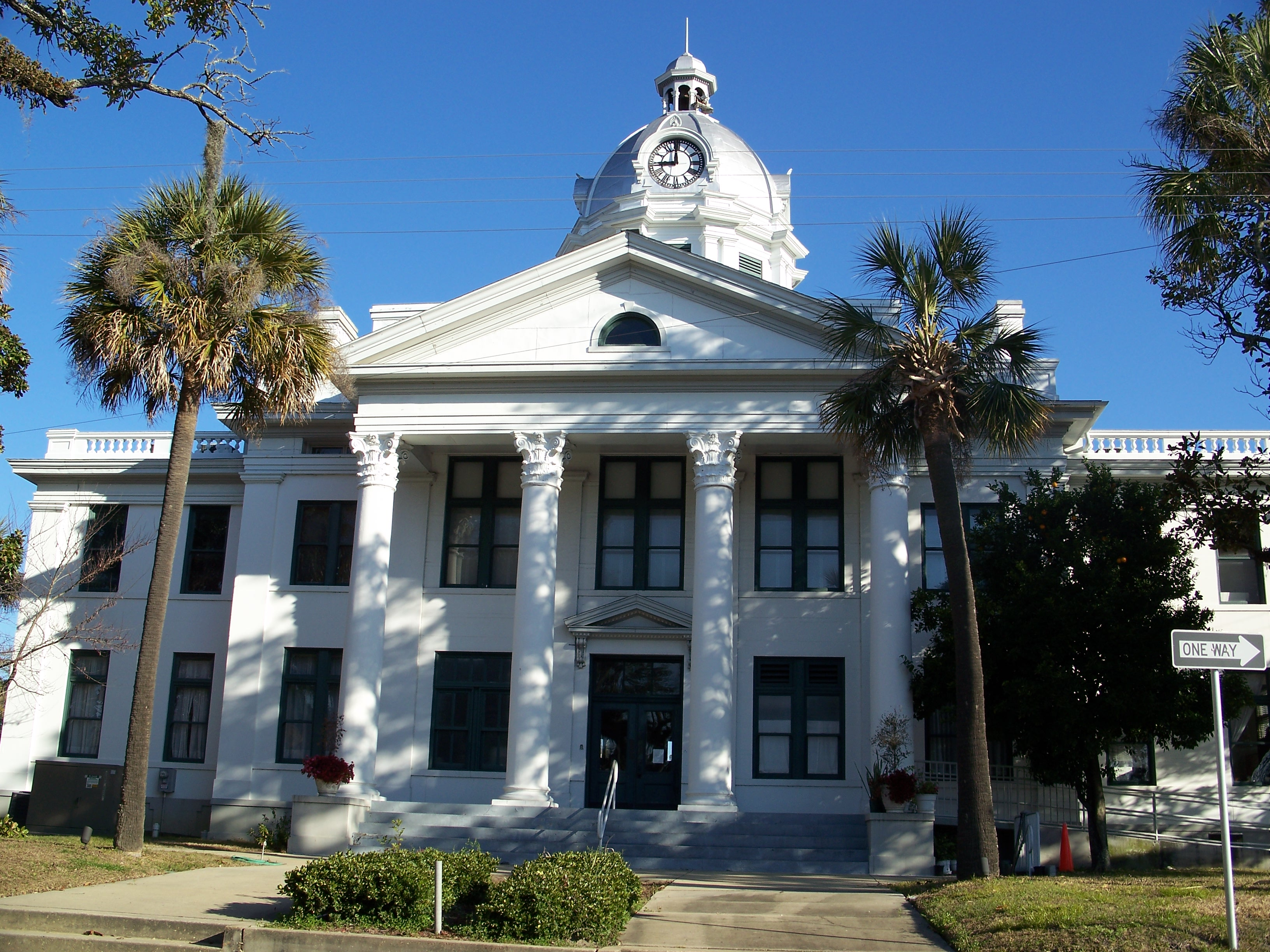
- Jefferson County Courthouse

- Location within Florida Location within the United States
- Interactive map showing the location of Jefferson County Courthouse
- Location: Monticello, Florida
- Coordinates: 30°32′42.17″N 83°52′12.5″W
- Built: 1909
- Architect: Edward Columbus Hosford
- Architectural style: Classical Revival
- Part of: Monticello Historic District (ID77000405)

The Jefferson County Courthouse is an historic Classical Revival style courthouse building located in Monticello, Florida. Built in 1909, it was designed by Georgia-born architect Edward Columbus Hosford, who is noted for the courthouses and other buildings that he designed in Florida, Georgia and Texas. The builder was Mutual Construction Company of Louisville, Kentucky, whose bid for the project was $39,412. The courthouse is located in the middle of a large traffic circle, at the intersection of US 90 and US 19.

It was modeled on President Thomas Jefferson’s famous house, Monticello, for which the town is named.

The motto, Suum Cuique, Latin for To each his own, which is inscribed over the doors of the courthouse, is jokingly pronounced Sue ‘em quick by some local residents.

The building is a contributing property in the Monticello Historic District, which was added to the National Register of Historic Places on August 19, 1977

== See also ==
- Jefferson County Courthouse (disambiguation)
