= Christ Episcopal Church and Rectory (Douglas, Wyoming) =

Historic church in Wyoming, United States

- U.S. National Register of Historic Places

- Location within Wyoming Location within the United States
- Location: 4th and Center Sts., Douglas, Wyoming
- Coordinates: 42°45′35″N 105°22′54″W
- Area: less than one acre
- Built: 1898; 128 years ago
- Architect: G.W.G. Van Winkle
- Architectural style: Gothic
- NRHP reference No.: 80004046
- Added to NRHP: November 17, 1980

Christ Episcopal Church is a historic Episcopal church located at 4th and Center Streets in Douglas, Wyoming. Built in 1898, the church is the oldest church in Douglas as well as the only wooden church remaining in the city. G.W.G. Van Winkle designed the church in the Gothic Revival style. The church's design features a bell tower, a steep roof, lancet windows with stained glass, and external buttresses. In addition to its religious function, the church has also hosted community and volunteer groups and social activities.

The church, together with its rectory, was added to the National Register of Historic Places in 1980.
