= Singing Boys of Pennsylvania =

- Wind Gap, Pennsylvania; United States of America

Information
- Type: Private
- Established: 1970

The Singing Boys of Pennsylvania was an American boys' choir, established in 1970 as the Pocono Boy Singers, which ceased operation in 2014. A 501(c) organization organized in 1970 as the Pocono Boy Singers, the choir was incorporated in 1972. Its post office box was located in Wind Gap, Pennsylvania, but it was physically based for many years in Stockertown, Pennsylvania. It drew its membership primarily from Monroe, Northampton, Lehigh, and Warren counties. The choir consisted of about 40 boys in grades 4 through 8. Membership was by invitation and audition.

The choir performed throughout the United States, Canada, Japan, England, Wales, and Mexico. Its website claimed an annual budget of $110,000, and 2013 Songwriter's Market listed it as having more than 100 concerts per year, paying $300–$3,000 for outright purchase of material.

The Singing Boys had a sister organization, the Keystone Girls Choir, founded in 1986. The Keystone Girls Choir initially performed with the Singing Boys; they had their first concert alone in May 1991.

The choir's founder and long-time director from 1970 to 2014 was Dr. K. Bernard Schade (alias Ken Werner), a graduate of the University of Texas at El Paso, Union Theological Seminary in New York (Institute of Sacred Music, now at Yale University), and the Pennsylvania State University (Ed.D). He served many Lutheran, Episcopal and Methodist churches in the region as an organist and choirmaster for several decades.

The choir ceased operations after Schade was sentenced in January 2015 to 4.5–10 years in prison for statutory sexual assault of a member of the boys choir and possession of child pornography. In June 2024, Schade was formally banned from entering churches in two Pennsylvania dioceses of the Episcopal Church. On February 13, 2026, Schade was sentenced to six months of electronic home monitoring and house arrest for failure to register with the Pennsylvania State Police under lifetime Megan's Law requirements as a Sexually Violent Predator.
