= Potter, Nebraska =

- Village
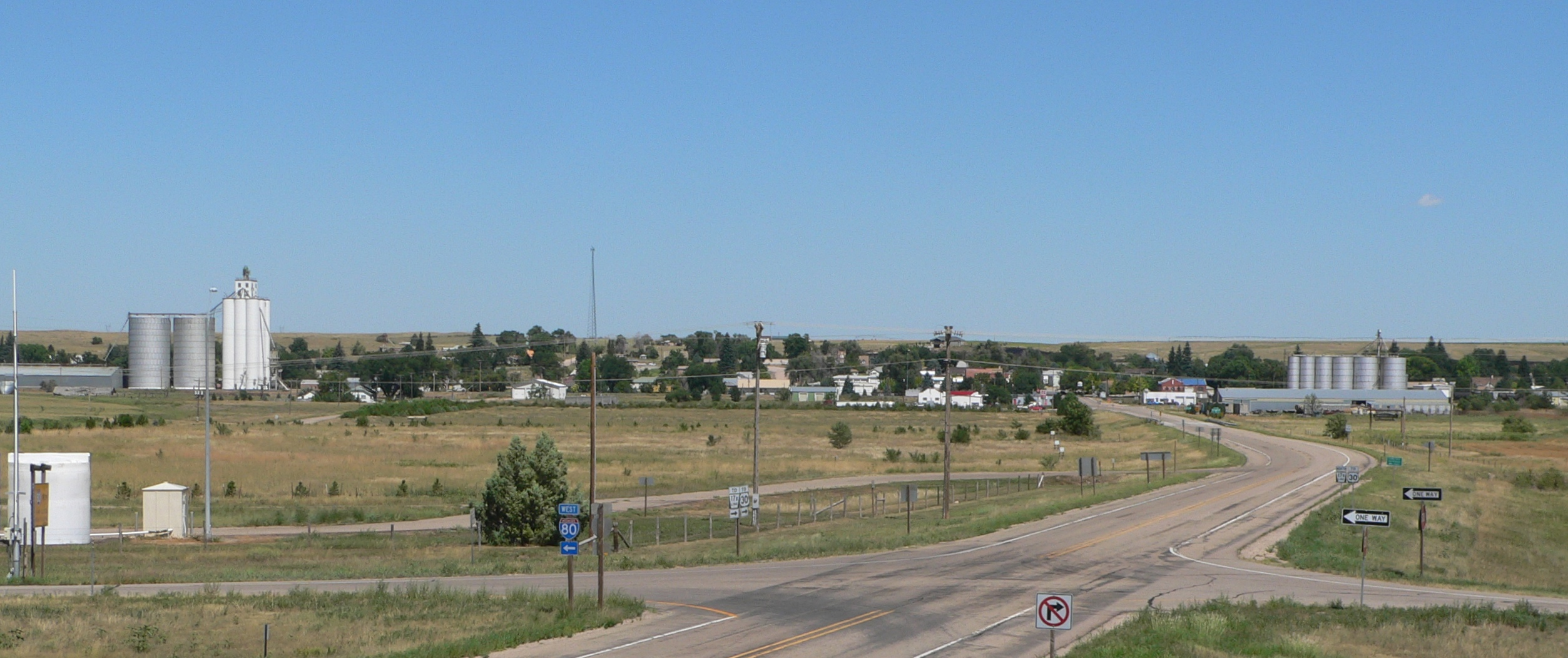
- Potter seen from Exit 38 on Interstate 80

- Location of Potter, Nebraska
- Coordinates: 41°13′08″N 103°19′01″W
- Country: United States
- State: Nebraska
- County: Cheyenne

Area
  - Total: 1.44 sq mi (3.73 km^{2})
  - Land: 1.44 sq mi (3.73 km^{2})
  - Water: 0 sq mi (0.00 km^{2})
- Elevation: 4,374 ft (1,333 m)

Population (2020)
  - Total: 342
  - Density: 237.6/sq mi (91.75/km^{2})
- Time zone: UTC-7 (Mountain (MST))
  - Summer (DST): UTC-6 (MDT)
- ZIP code: 69156
- Area code: 308
- FIPS code: 31-39870
- GNIS feature ID: 2399013
- Website: www.potterneb.com

Potter is a village in Cheyenne County, Nebraska, United States. As of the 2020 census, Potter had a population of 342.

== History ==
Potter got its start in the year 1870, following construction of the railroad through the territory. It was named for General Potter, a railroad shareholder.

On July 6, 1928, Potter received the largest hailstone ever recorded, which measured approximately 17 inches (43.2 centimeters) in diameter and weighed approximately 1.5 pounds (680 grams). Another hailstone of that diameter measurement was recovered in Aurora, Nebraska on June 22, 2003.

== Geography ==
According to the United States Census Bureau, the village has a total area of 0.46 square miles (1.19 km^{2}), all land.

== Demographics ==
Historical population
Census	Pop.	Note	%±
1920	486		—
1930	515		6.0%
1940	387		−24.9%
1950	421		8.8%
1960	554		31.6%
1980	369		—
1990	388		5.1%
2000	390		0.5%
2010	337		−13.6%
2020	342		1.5%
U.S. Decennial Census

=== 2010 census ===
As of the census of 2010, there were 337 people, 151 households, and 101 families residing in the village. The population density was 732.6 inhabitants per square mile (282.9/km^{2}). There were 175 housing units at an average density of 380.4 per square mile (146.9/km^{2}). The racial makeup of the village was 96.1% White, 1.2% Native American, and 2.7% from other races. Hispanic or Latino of any race were 4.5% of the population.

There were 151 households, of which 26.5% had children under the age of 18 living with them, 56.3% were married couples living together, 6.0% had a female householder with no husband present, 4.6% had a male householder with no wife present, and 33.1% were non-families. 30.5% of all households were made up of individuals, and 13.2% had someone living alone who was 65 years of age or older. The average household size was 2.23 and the average family size was 2.79.

The median age in the village was 45.8 years. 22.3% of residents were under the age of 18; 4.4% were between the ages of 18 and 24; 20.4% were from 25 to 44; 37.1% were from 45 to 64; and 15.7% were 65 years of age or older. The gender makeup of the village was 48.1% male and 51.9% female.

=== 2000 census ===
As of the census of 2000, there were 390 people, 159 households, and 104 families residing in the village. The population density was 799.0 inhabitants per square mile (308.5/km^{2}). There were 170 housing units at an average density of 348.3 per square mile (134.5/km^{2}). The racial makeup of the village was 97.95% White, 0.26% Native American, 0.77% from other races, and 1.03% from two or more races. Hispanic or Latino of any race were 2.31% of the population.

There were 159 households, out of which 37.1% had children under the age of 18 living with them, 54.7% were married couples living together, 5.7% had a female householder with no husband present, and 34.0% were non-families. 30.8% of all households were made up of individuals, and 15.1% had someone living alone who was 65 years of age or older. The average household size was 2.45 and the average family size was 3.10.

In the village, the population was spread out, with 31.0% under the age of 18, 4.6% from 18 to 24, 28.2% from 25 to 44, 21.8% from 45 to 64, and 14.4% who were 65 years of age or older. The median age was 36 years. For every 100 females, there were 91.2 males. For every 100 females age 18 and over, there were 92.1 males.

The median income for a household in the village was $28,750, and the median income for a family was $37,000. Males had a median income of $26,932 versus $24,500 for females. The per capita income for the village was $14,344. About 13.5% of families and 17.8% of the population were below the poverty line, including 19.5% of those under age 18 and 20.8% of those age 65 or over.
