= Brownson, Nebraska =

Unincorporated community in Nebraska, United States

- Unincorporated Community
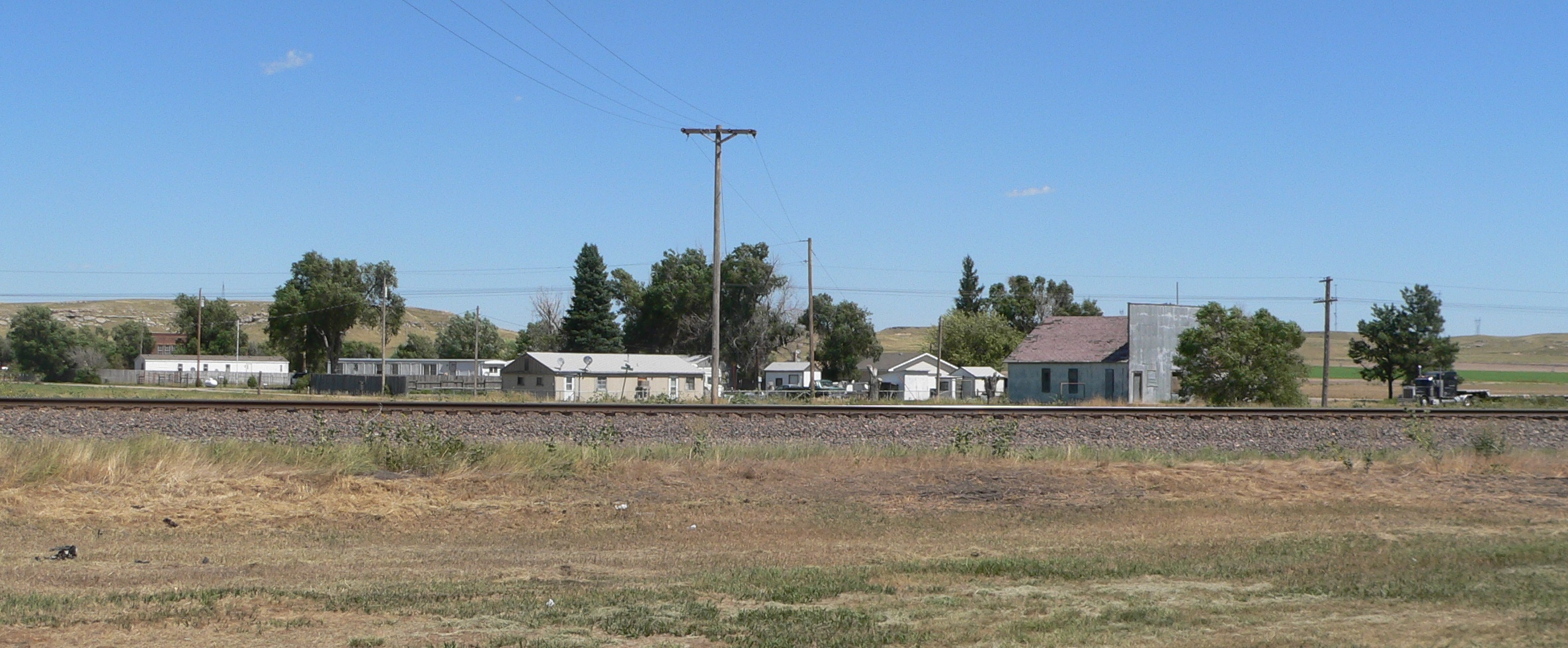
- Brownson from the Southwest

- Location within Nebraska Location within the United States
- Coordinates: 41.2°N 103.1°W
- Country: United States
- State: Nebraska
- County: Cheyenne

Brownson is an unincorporated community in Cheyenne County, Nebraska, United States.

It is one endpoint of the Sidney and Lowe Railroad.

== History ==
Brownson was named for a former general freight agent of the Union Pacific Railroad. A post office called Bronson (without the W) operated from 1887 until 1895.
