= Christ Episcopal Church (Bayfield, Wisconsin) =

Historic church in Wisconsin, United States

Coordinates: 46°48′32″N 90°49′06″W

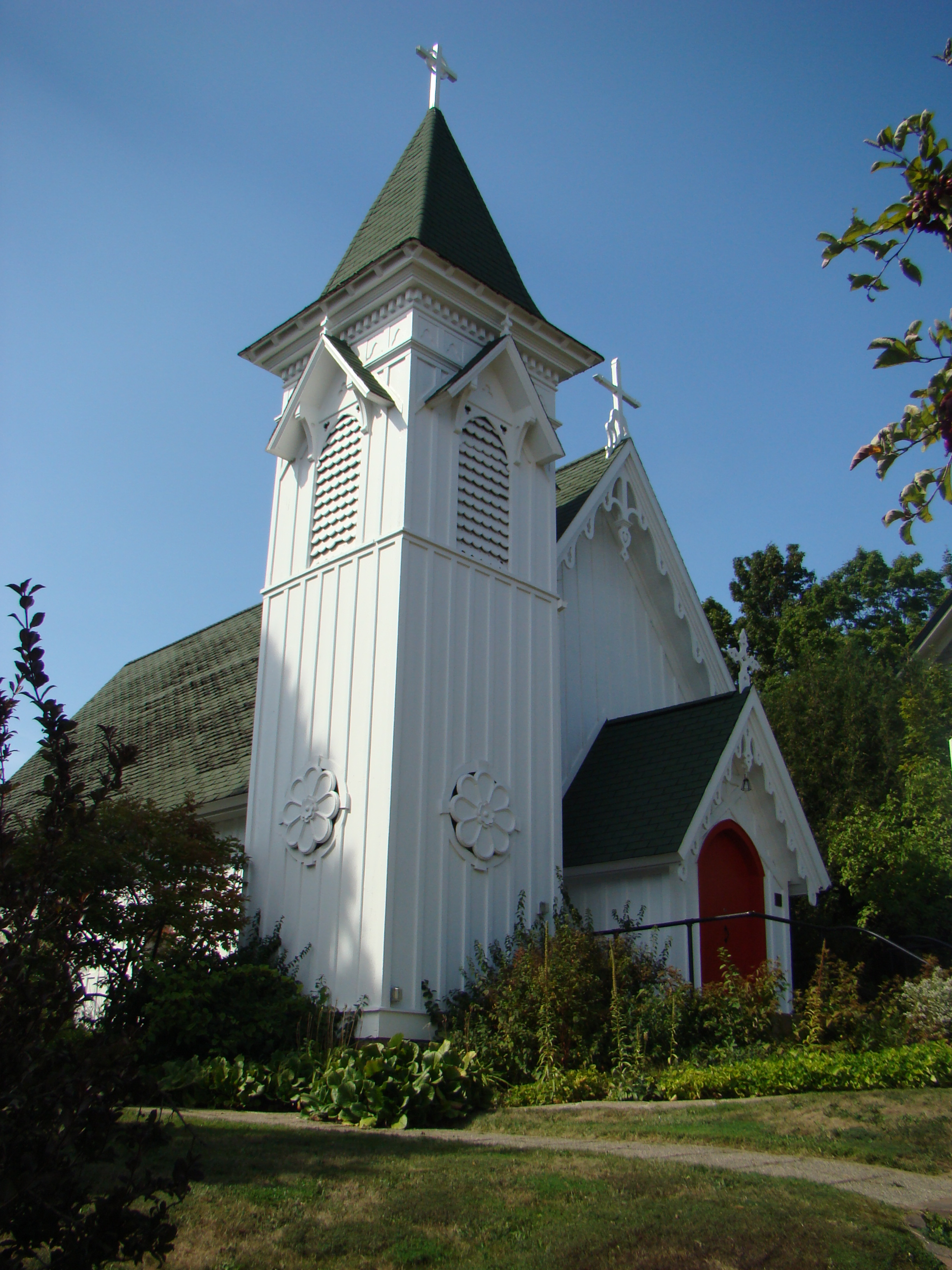

- Location within the United States
- Location: Bayfield, Wisconsin
- Country: United States
- Denomination: Episcopal

History
- Founded: 1870

Architecture
- Architectural type: Carpenter Gothic

Christ Episcopal Church was built in 1870 and is located in Bayfield, Wisconsin. It was designed in the Victorian Gothic and Carpenter Gothic architectural styles. The church was added to the National Register of Historic Places for its architectural significance in 1974. It is part of the Episcopal Diocese of Wisconsin, and previously of the Episcopal Diocese of Eau Claire. The church's statistics are reported nationally as the Episcopal Church of Chequamegon Bay, which had 10 members in 2015 and 24 members in 2023. Average attendance (ASA) was 39 persons a Sunday, with plate and pledge income of $41,305.
