= Cheyenne County, Nebraska =

County in Nebraska, United States

- County
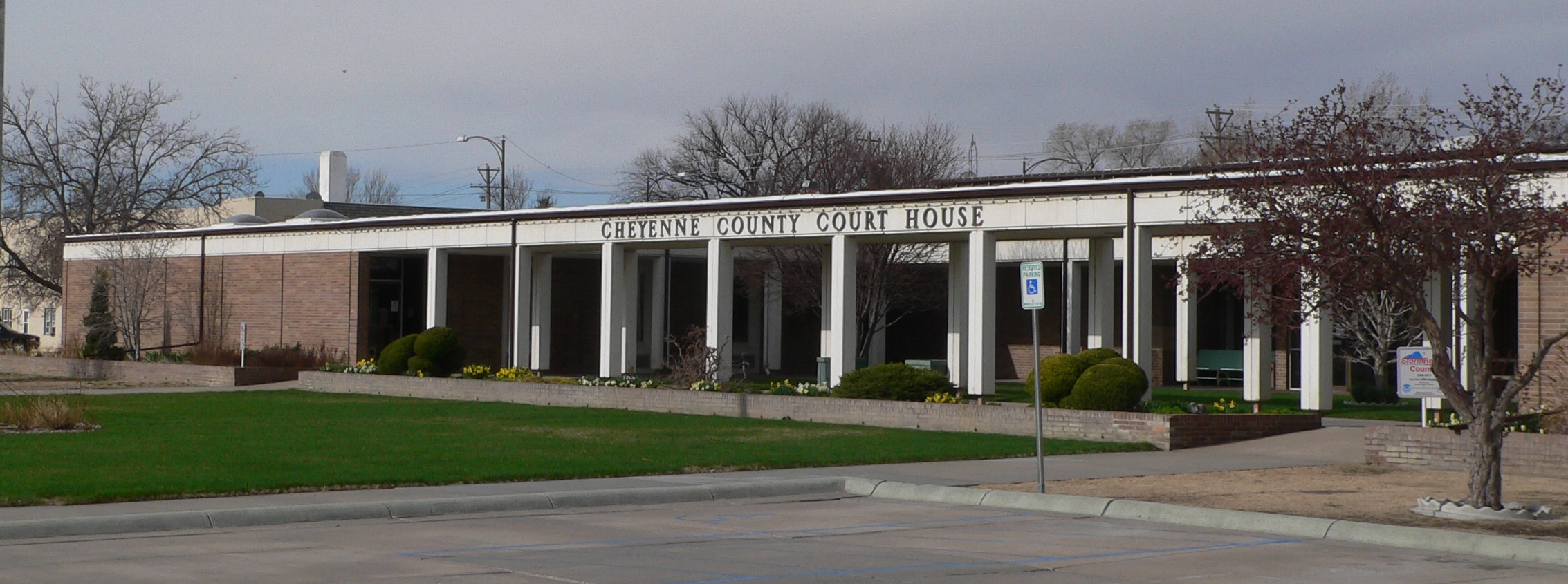
- Cheyenne County Courthouse in Sidney

- Location within the U.S. state of Nebraska
- Coordinates: 41°13′N 102°59′W
- Country: United States
- State: Nebraska
- Founded: 1871
- Named for: Cheyenne people
- Seat: Sidney
- Largest city: Sidney

Area
  - Total: 1,196 sq mi (3,100 km^{2})
  - Land: 1,196 sq mi (3,100 km^{2})
  - Water: 0.1 sq mi (0.26 km^{2}) 0.01%

Population (2020)
  - Total: 9,468
  - Estimate (2025): 9,528 ▲
  - Density: 7.916/sq mi (3.057/km^{2})
- Time zone: UTC−7 (Mountain)
  - Summer (DST): UTC−6 (MDT)
- Congressional district: 3rd
- Website: cheyennecounty.nebraska.gov

Cheyenne County is a county in the U.S. state of Nebraska. As of the 2020 United States census, the population was 9,468. Its county seat is Sidney. The county was formed in 1871 and named for the Cheyenne Native American tribe. In the Nebraska license plate system, Cheyenne County is represented by the prefix 39 as it had the 39th-largest number of vehicles registered in the county when the license plate system was established in 1922.

== Geography ==
Cheyenne County lies on the south side of Nebraska. Its south boundary line abuts with the north boundary line of the state of Colorado. According to the US Census Bureau, the county has an area of 1,196 square miles (3,100 km^{2}), of which 1,196 square miles (3,100 km^{2}) is land and 0.1 square miles (0.26 km^{2}) (0.01%) is water.

=== Major highways ===
- Interstate 80
- U.S. Highway 30
- U.S. Highway 385
- Nebraska Highway 19

=== Adjacent counties ===
- Morrill County - north
- Garden County - northeast
- Deuel County - east
- Sedgwick County, Colorado - southeast
- Logan County, Colorado - south
- Kimball County - west
- Banner County - northwest

== Demographics ==
Historical population
Census	Pop.	Note	%±
1870	190		—
1880	1,558		720.0%
1890	5,693		265.4%
1900	5,570		−2.2%
1910	4,551		−18.3%
1920	8,405		84.7%
1930	10,187		21.2%
1940	9,505		−6.7%
1950	12,081		27.1%
1960	14,828		22.7%
1970	10,778		−27.3%
1980	10,057		−6.7%
1990	9,494		−5.6%
2000	9,830		3.5%
2010	9,998		1.7%
2020	9,468		−5.3%
2025 (est.)	9,528	▲	0.6%
US Decennial Census; 1790-1960 1900-1990; 1990-2000 2010 2020

=== 2020 census ===
As of the 2020 census, the county had a population of 9,468. The median age was 42.9 years. 22.7% of residents were under the age of 18 and 21.3% of residents were 65 years of age or older. For every 100 females there were 99.1 males, and for every 100 females age 18 and over there were 98.5 males age 18 and over.

The racial makeup of the county was 90.0% White, 0.6% Black or African American, 0.5% American Indian and Alaska Native, 0.8% Asian, 0.0% Native Hawaiian and Pacific Islander, 3.0% from some other race, and 5.0% from two or more races. Hispanic or Latino residents of any race comprised 7.9% of the population.

65.8% of residents lived in urban areas, while 34.2% lived in rural areas.

There were 4,168 households in the county, of which 27.2% had children under the age of 18 living with them and 24.9% had a female householder with no spouse or partner present. About 33.4% of all households were made up of individuals and 14.9% had someone living alone who was 65 years of age or older.

There were 4,891 housing units, of which 14.8% were vacant. Among occupied housing units, 69.4% were owner-occupied and 30.6% were renter-occupied. The homeowner vacancy rate was 3.2% and the rental vacancy rate was 13.8%.

=== 2000 census ===
As of the 2000 United States census, there were 9,830 people, 4,071 households, and 2,686 families in the county. The population density was 8 people per square mile (3.1 people/km^{2}). There were 4,569 housing units at an average density of 4 units per square mile (1.5/km^{2}). The racial makeup of the county was 96.34% White, 0.14% Black or African American, 0.65% Native American, 0.40% Asian, 0.03% Pacific Islander, 1.46% from other races, and 0.98% from two or more races. 4.46% of the population were Hispanic or Latino of any race. 45.3% were of German, 9.1% English, 7.6% Irish and 7.5% American.

There were 4,071 households, out of which 31.10% had children under the age of 18 living with them, 54.80% were married couples living together, 8.00% had a female householder with no husband present, and 34.00% were non-families. 30.10% of all households were made up of individuals, and 13.30% had someone living alone who was 65 years of age or older. The average household size was 2.38 and the average family size was 2.96.

The county population contained 26.30% under the age of 18, 7.00% from 18 to 24, 26.70% from 25 to 44, 22.80% from 45 to 64, and 17.20% who were 65 years of age or older. The median age was 39 years. For every 100 females there were 96.00 males. For every 100 females age 18 and over, there were 92.20 males.

The median income for a household in the county was $33,438, and the median income for a family was $41,024. Males had a median income of $30,000 versus $20,467 for females. The per capita income for the county was $17,437. About 8.20% of families and 10.00% of the population were below the poverty line, including 11.80% of those under age 18 and 7.40% of those age 65 or over.

== Communities ==
=== City ===
- Sidney (county seat)

=== Villages ===
- Dalton
- Gurley
- Lodgepole
- Potter

=== Census-designated places ===
- Lorenzo
- Sunol

=== Unincorporated communities ===
- Brownson
- Colton

== Politics ==
Cheyenne County voters are reliably Republican. In no national election since 1936 has the county selected the Democratic Party candidate, and only four total since 1900.

United States presidential election results for Cheyenne County, Nebraska
Year	Republican		Democratic		Third party(ies)	
Year	No.	%	No.	%	No.	%
1900	714	56.98%	509	40.62%	30	2.39%
1904	681	65.92%	267	25.85%	85	8.23%
1908	886	50.34%	809	45.97%	65	3.69%
1912	233	24.27%	348	36.25%	379	39.48%
1916	563	38.22%	834	56.62%	76	5.16%
1920	1,857	71.92%	604	23.39%	121	4.69%
1924	1,719	51.76%	555	16.71%	1,047	31.53%
1928	2,618	62.29%	1,563	37.19%	22	0.52%
1932	1,285	28.78%	3,068	68.71%	112	2.51%
1936	1,374	30.93%	2,950	66.41%	118	2.66%
1940	2,394	55.20%	1,943	44.80%	0	0.00%
1944	2,654	60.24%	1,752	39.76%	0	0.00%
1948	2,161	50.26%	2,139	49.74%	0	0.00%
1952	4,206	65.48%	2,217	34.52%	0	0.00%
1956	3,809	63.58%	2,182	36.42%	0	0.00%
1960	3,814	59.65%	2,580	40.35%	0	0.00%
1964	3,129	53.78%	2,689	46.22%	0	0.00%
1968	2,725	65.95%	993	24.03%	414	10.02%
1972	3,120	76.66%	950	23.34%	0	0.00%
1976	2,285	56.39%	1,665	41.09%	102	2.52%
1980	3,073	74.81%	776	18.89%	259	6.30%
1984	3,159	77.73%	857	21.09%	48	1.18%
1988	2,862	67.77%	1,333	31.57%	28	0.66%
1992	2,197	51.80%	967	22.80%	1,077	25.39%
1996	2,571	64.83%	1,059	26.70%	336	8.47%
2000	3,207	76.61%	844	20.16%	135	3.23%
2004	3,791	79.88%	893	18.82%	62	1.31%
2008	3,572	73.82%	1,173	24.24%	94	1.94%
2012	3,449	74.19%	1,084	23.32%	116	2.50%
2016	3,665	77.80%	711	15.09%	335	7.11%
2020	3,813	79.84%	855	17.90%	108	2.26%
2024	3,692	81.11%	787	17.29%	73	1.60%

== See also ==
- National Register of Historic Places listings in Cheyenne County, Nebraska
