= Christ Episcopal Church (Cañon City, Colorado) =

Historic church in Colorado, United States

- U.S. National Register of Historic Places
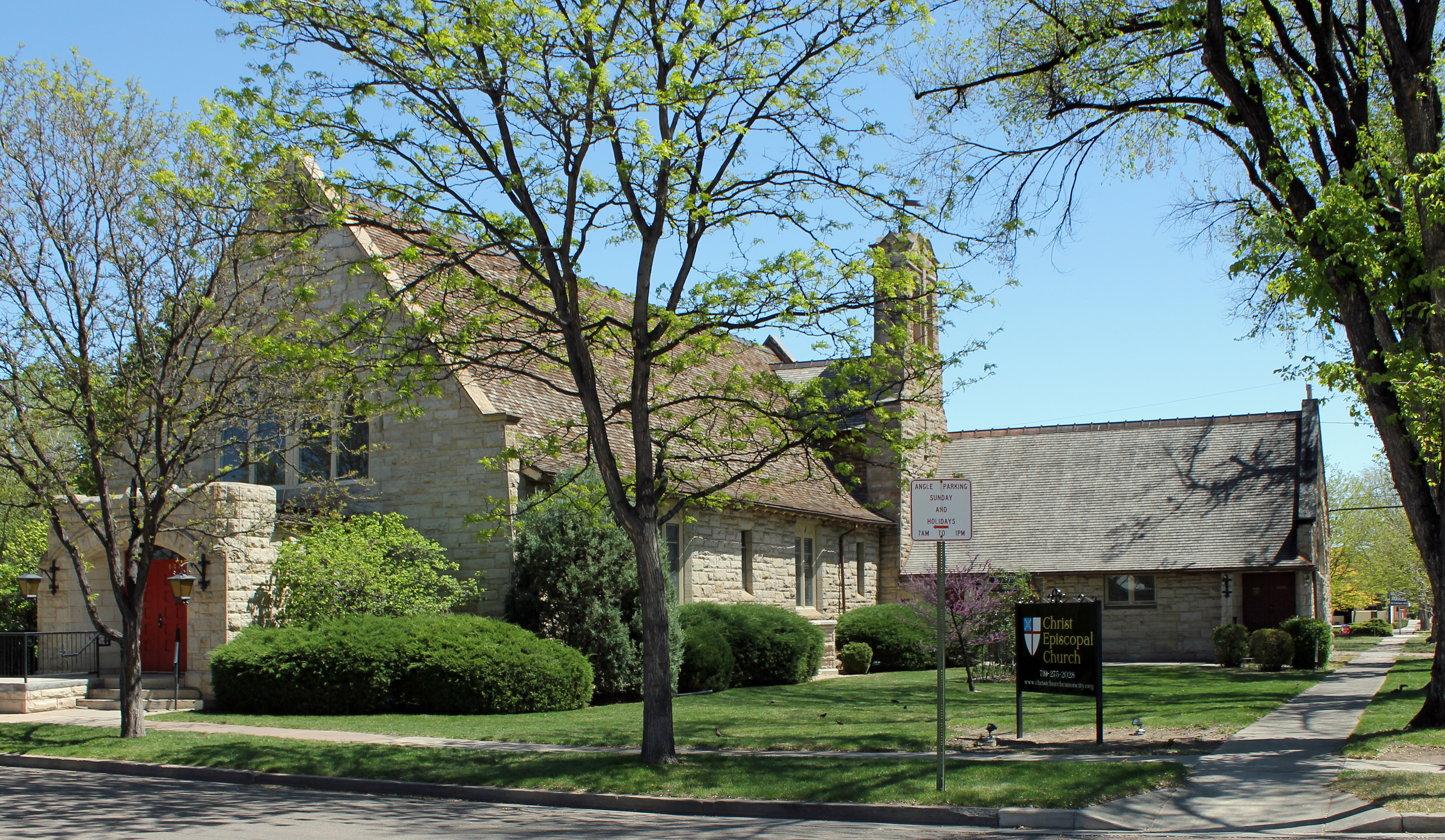

- Location within Colorado Location within the United States
- Location: 802 Harrison Ave., Cañon City, Colorado
- Coordinates: 38°26′41″N 105°14′16″W
- Area: less than one acre
- Built: 1902, 1960
- Architect: Thomas MacLaren
- Architectural style: Late 19th and 20th Century Revivals
- NRHP reference No.: 94001011
- Added to NRHP: August 19, 1994

The Christ Episcopal Church in Cañon City, Colorado was built in 1902. It is a congregation of the Episcopal Diocese of Colorado.

In 2017, the church reported 150 members; in 2023, it reported 58 members. No membership statistics were reported in 2024 national parochial reports. Plate and pledge financial support reported by the church in 2024 was $147,025. Average Sunday Attendance (ASA) reported in 2024 was 39 persons. This was a relative decrease from ASA of 71 reported in 2016.

The Rev. Kathy T. Hettinga is the church's rector.

== Building ==
The building was added to the National Register of Historic Places in 1994. It is a T-shaped ashlar building consisting of a front-gabled, main section plus a gabled west wing, built in an L-shape in 1902, and a gabled east wing built in 1960.
