= Sidney Historic Business District =

Historic district in Nebraska, United States

- U.S. National Register of Historic Places
- U.S. Historic district
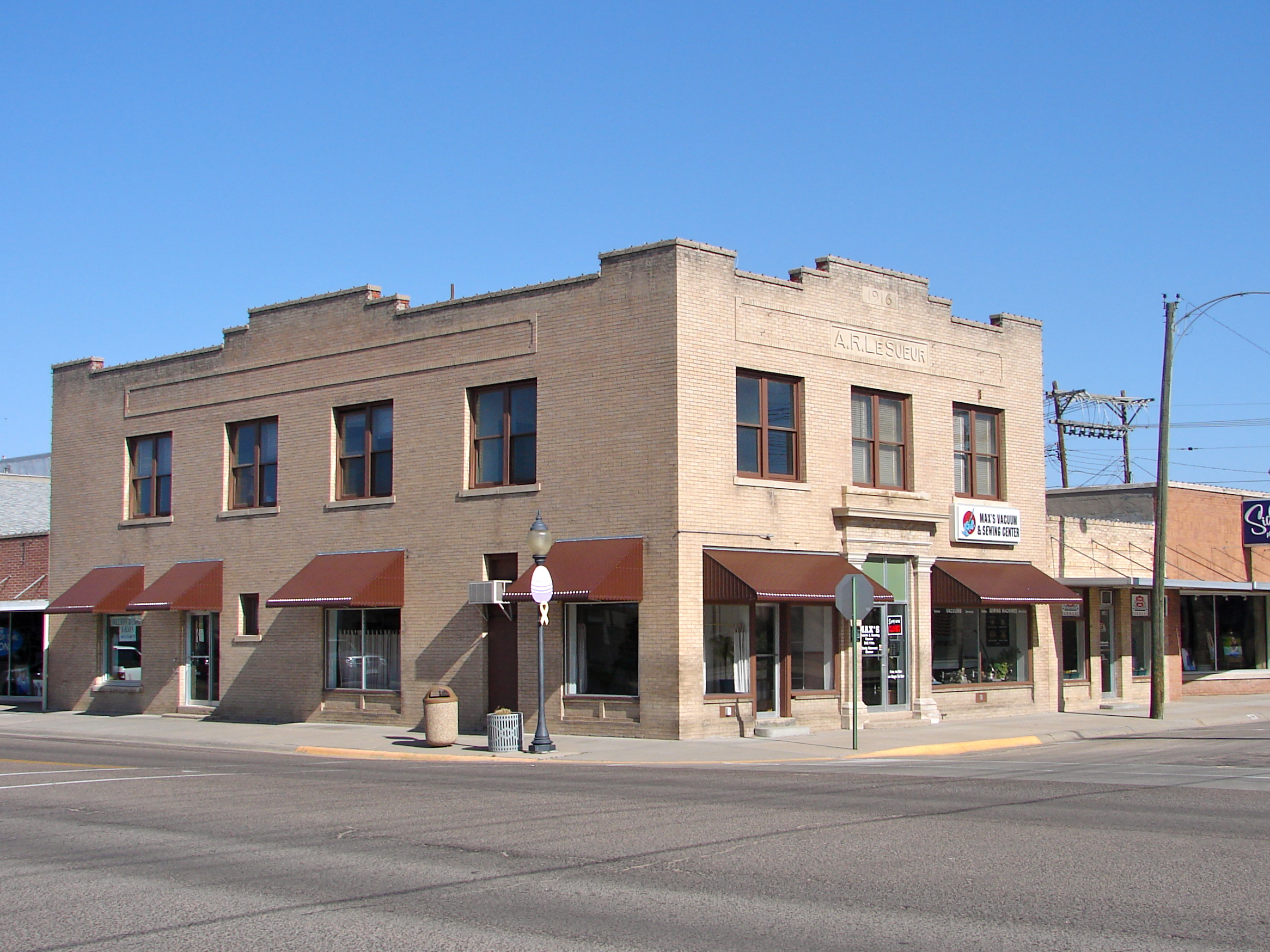
- LeSeur Building, built in 1916

- Location within Nebraska Location within the United States
- Location: Roughly bounded by Hickory and King Sts. and 9th and 11th Aves., Sidney, Nebraska
- Coordinates: 41.14434°N 102.97676°W
- Area: 6 acres (2.4 ha)
- Architect: Forbes & Green; et al.
- Architectural style: Late 19th and 20th Century Revivals
- NRHP reference No.: 94001233
- Added to NRHP: October 21, 1994

The Sidney Historic Business District is a historic district that was listed on the National Register of Historic Places in 1994.

It is a 6-acre (2.4 ha) area roughly bounded by Hickory and King Sts. and 9th and 11th Aves. in Sidney, Nebraska. It includes 29 contributing buildings.

It was deemed significant "in the area of commerce": "The district conveys a strong association with commercial activities that began with the arrival of the Union Pacific [Railroad]" in 1867.
