= Sioux Ordnance Depot Fire & Guard Headquarters =

- U.S. National Register of Historic Places
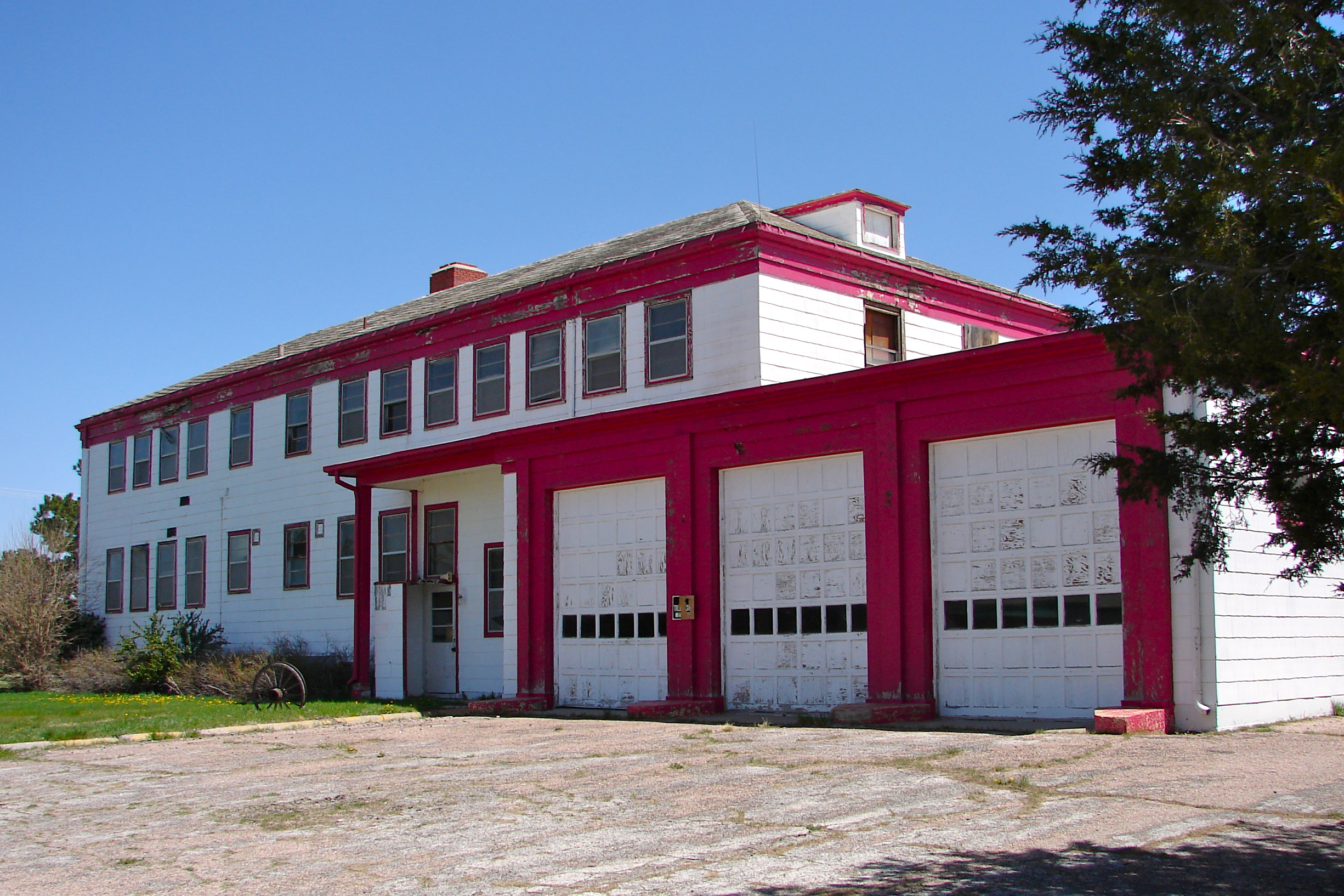
- 2011 photo

- Location within Nebraska
- Nearest city: Sidney, Nebraska
- Coordinates: 41°12′52″N 103°06′14″W
- Area: 1.5 acres (0.61 ha)
- Built: 1942
- Built by: Charles DeLeuw & Company
- Architect: US Army Corps of Engineers
- NRHP reference No.: 94001234
- Added to NRHP: October 24, 1994

The Sioux Ordnance Depot Fire & Guard Headquarters, near Sidney, Nebraska, was built in 1942. It was listed on the National Register of Historic Places in 1994. The listing included a contributing building and a contributing structure.

It was part of a World War II-era munitions depot, which operated until 1967. The listing consists of the two-story headquarters building and "vintage cedar tree plantings". It is located at the junction of 1st Ave. and Military Rd.

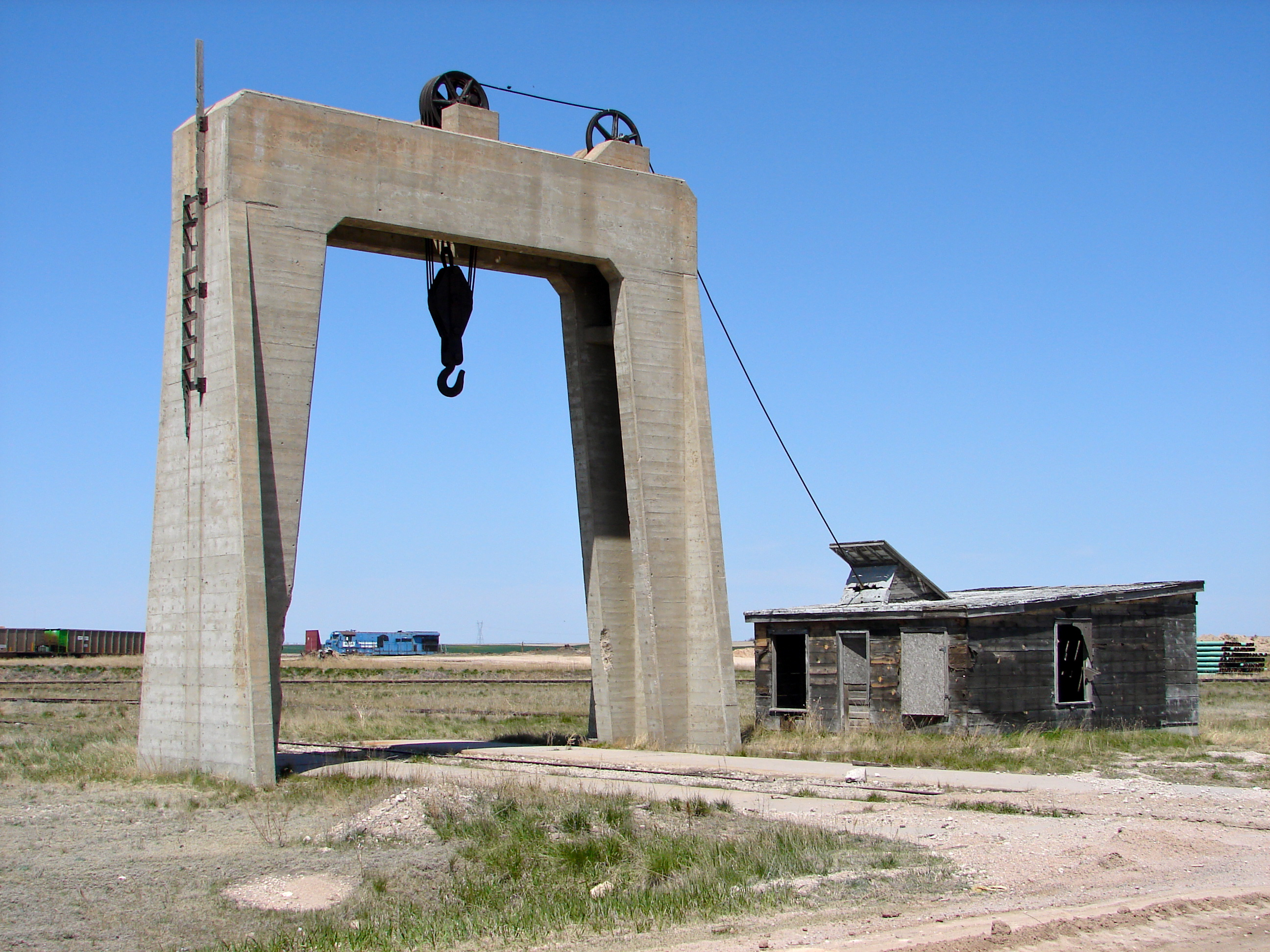
Concrete depot crane of the depot

In 1994 it was used as a volunteer fire station for the Western Nebraska Community College, as the Western Nebraska Community College Fire Station.
