= Christ Episcopal Church (Oberlin, Ohio) =

Historic church in Ohio, United States

- U.S. National Register of Historic Places
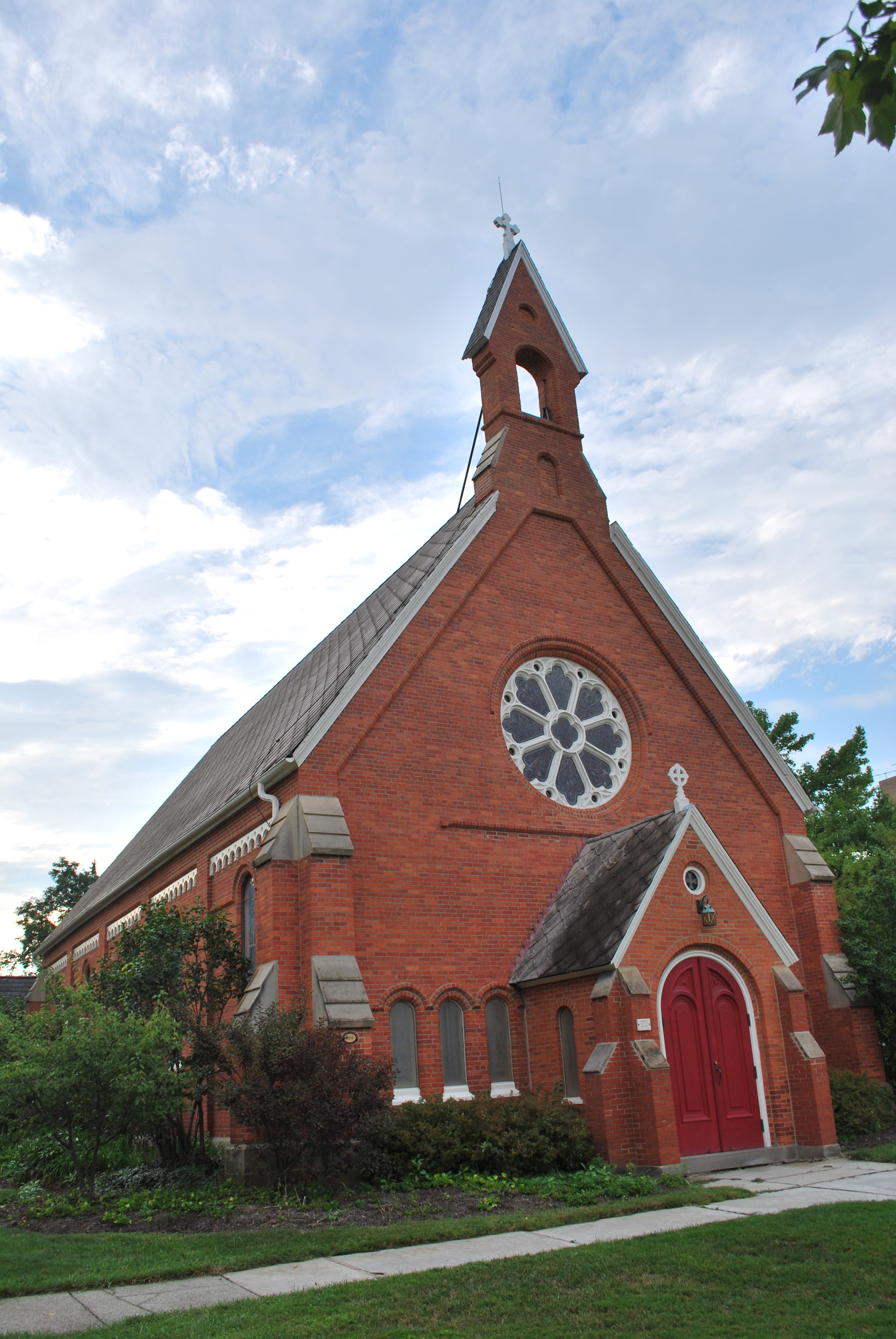

- Location within Ohio Location within the United States
- Location: 156 S. Main St., Oberlin, Ohio
- Coordinates: 41°17′15″N 82°13′5″W
- Area: 1 acre (0.40 ha)
- Built: 1855
- Architect: Frank Wills
- Architectural style: Romanesque
- NRHP reference No.: 78002114
- Added to NRHP: November 30, 1978

Christ Episcopal Church is a historic church at 156 S. Main Street in Oberlin, Ohio. The congregation is part of the Episcopal Diocese of Ohio. In 2016, the church reported 103 members; in 2023, it reported 81 members. No membership statistics were reported in 2024 national parochial reports. Plate and pledge financial support reported by the church in 2023 was $228,582. Average Sunday Attendance (ASA) reported in 2024 was 51 persons. This was a relative decrease on ASA of 70 in 2016.

The church building was constructed in 1855 and added to the National Register in 1978.

In addition to weekly masses, the church offers weekday community meals and a home stay program.
