= Christ Episcopal Church (Springfield, Missouri) =

Historic church in Missouri, United States

- U.S. National Register of Historic Places
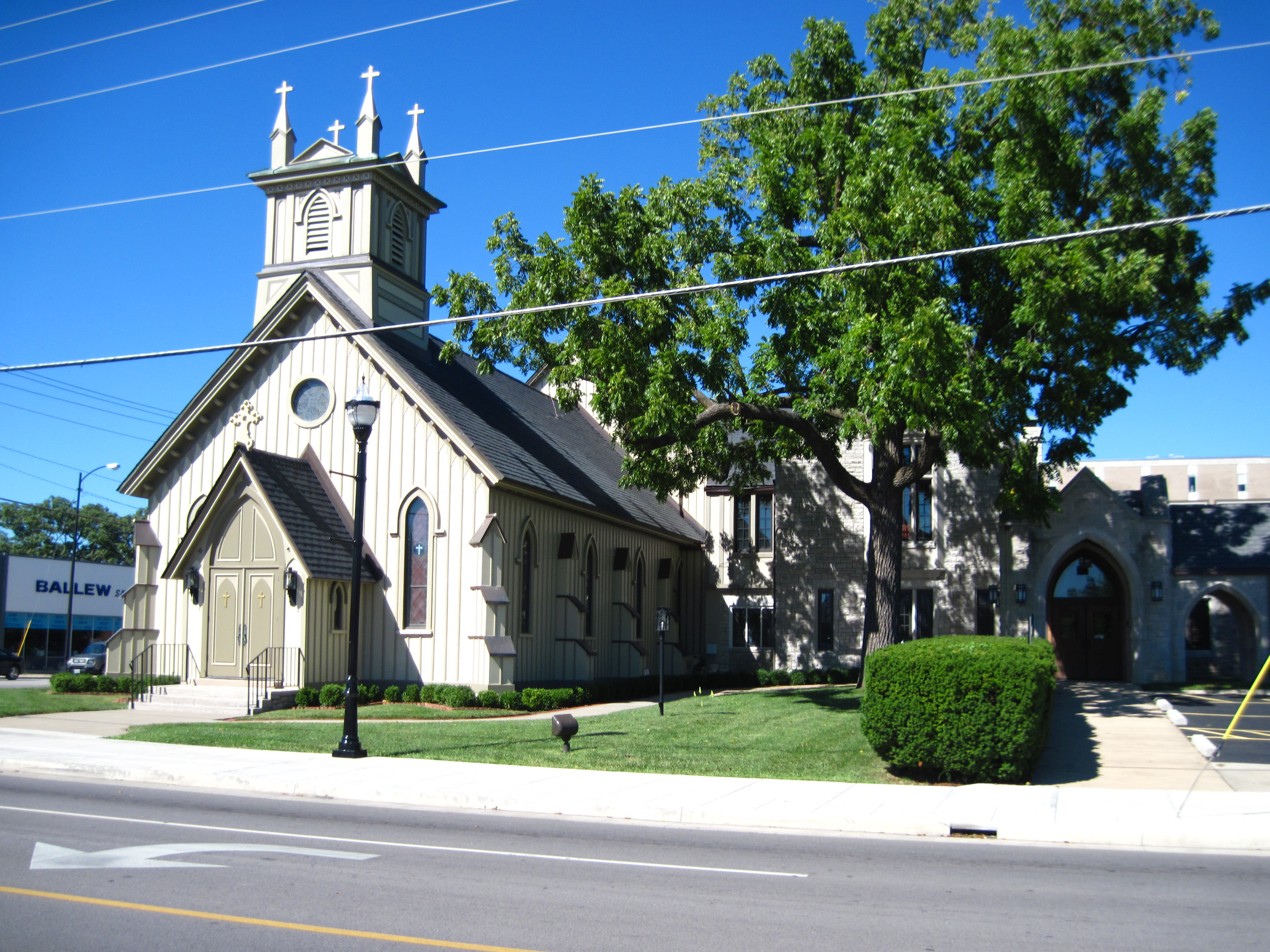

- Location within Missouri Location within the United States
- Nearest city: Springfield, Missouri
- Coordinates: 37.2071°N 93.2865°W
- Area: less than one acre
- Built: 1870, 1927-1928
- Architect: Hoener, Baum & Froese
- Architectural style: Gothic Revival, Other, Collegiate/Early Eng. Gothic
- NRHP reference No.: 87000514
- Added to NRHP: March 26, 1987

Christ Episcopal Church is a historic Episcopal church in Springfield, Greene County, Missouri. The church nave was built in 1870, and is a board-and-batten Gothic Revival style structure with a stone chancel added in 1927–1928. A two-story, Collegiate Gothic style stone parish hall was added in 1927.

It was listed on the National Register of Historic Places in 1987.
