= Gurley, Nebraska =

- Village
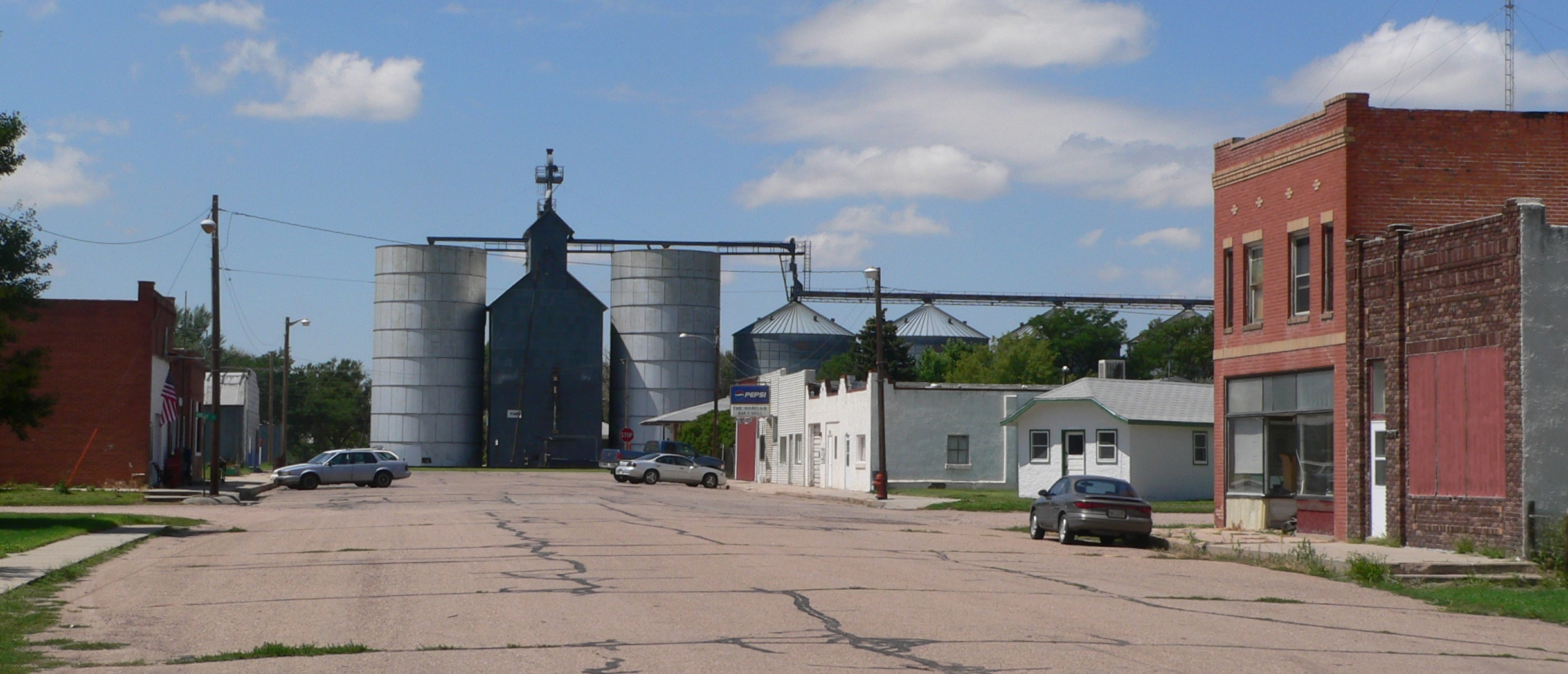
- Downtown Gurley

- Location of Gurley, Nebraska
- Coordinates: 41°19′17″N 102°58′28″W
- Country: United States
- State: Nebraska
- County: Cheyenne

Area
  - Total: 0.19 sq mi (0.48 km^{2})
  - Land: 0.19 sq mi (0.48 km^{2})
  - Water: 0 sq mi (0.00 km^{2})
- Elevation: 4,285 ft (1,306 m)

Population (2020)
  - Total: 187
  - Density: 1,000.9/sq mi (386.46/km^{2})
- Time zone: UTC-7 (Mountain (MST))
  - Summer (DST): UTC-6 (MDT)
- ZIP code: 69141
- Area code: 308
- FIPS code: 31-20435
- GNIS feature ID: 2398218

Gurley is a village in Cheyenne County, Nebraska, United States. As of the 2020 census, Gurley had a population of 187.

== Geography ==
According to the United States Census Bureau, the village has a total area of 0.19 square miles (0.49 km^{2}), all land.

== History ==
Gurley was founded in 1913 when the railroad was extended to that point. It was named for Fred R. Gurley, superintendent with the Burlington Railroad. The first Gurley depot station was opened during the winter of 1915-1916. Three bunk cars served as a station building. One was the office, one was for freight and one was for living quarters for the agent and his family. The first agent was George Wallen. Fred Gurley was the agent from 1916-1919. During the time that Fred was the agent he started a park north of the depot. He planted flowers and made the trellis that was in the center of it and there is still a park there today. The Gurley Lumber Company was one of the first businesses in Gurley. S.J. Flora came in 1914 to be the manager of this business. The first person born in Gurley was Clara Anneva Flora, later to be named Clara Lessig. As of December 2008, Clara is still an active member of the Gurley community. The first general store and a post office were operated by F.W. Busse. In the same building, there was a pharmacy and a doctor's office. Dr. Hart was the doctor at that time. He also had the first telephone switchboard in Gurley. Christ Weyerts built a Weyerts Garage and dance hall about 1915. The Gurley State Bank was built by Christ Weyerts in 1915 on the south side of main street. This closed in 1921. A.K. Greenlee built and operated a grocery and dry goods store on the south side. This brick building was built in 1915. Gurley's first grain elevator was erected in 1914-1915 and burned on March 14, 1941. The rebuilt grain elevator was acquired by the Farmer's Union Elevator in August 1960.

== Demographics ==
Historical population
Census	Pop.	Note	%±
1920	291		—
1930	232		−20.3%
1940	203		−12.5%
1950	219		7.9%
1960	329		50.2%
1970	233		−29.2%
1980	212		−9.0%
1990	198		−6.6%
2000	228		15.2%
2010	214		−6.1%
2020	187		−12.6%
U.S. Decennial Census

=== 2010 census ===
As of the census of 2010, there were 214 people, 96 households, and 56 families residing in the village. The population density was 1,126.3 inhabitants per square mile (434.9/km^{2}). There were 116 housing units at an average density of 610.5 per square mile (235.7/km^{2}). The racial makeup of the village was 96.7% White, 0.5% African American, 1.9% Native American, 0.5% from other races, and 0.5% from two or more races. Hispanic or Latino of any race were 10.3% of the population.

There were 96 households, of which 21.9% had children under the age of 18 living with them, 51.0% were married couples living together, 5.2% had a female householder with no husband present, 2.1% had a male householder with no wife present, and 41.7% were non-families. 32.3% of all households were made up of individuals, and 8.3% had someone living alone who was 65 years of age or older. The average household size was 2.23 and the average family size was 2.89.

The median age in the village was 45.2 years. 19.6% of residents were under the age of 18; 7.4% were between the ages of 18 and 24; 22.4% were from 25 to 44; 34.1% were from 45 to 64; and 16.4% were 65 years of age or older. The gender makeup of the village was 53.3% male and 46.7% female.

=== 2000 census ===
As of the census of 2000, there were 228 people, 97 households, and 61 families residing in the village. The population density was 1,219.4 inhabitants per square mile (470.8/km^{2}). There were 108 housing units at an average density of 577.6 per square mile (223.0/km^{2}). The racial makeup of the village was 96.49% White, 1.32% Native American, 1.32% from other races, and 0.88% from two or more races. Hispanic or Latino of any race were 5.26% of the population.

There were 97 households, out of which 32.0% had children under the age of 18 living with them, 49.5% were married couples living together, 12.4% had a female householder with no husband present, and 37.1% were non-families. 33.0% of all households were made up of individuals, and 18.6% had someone living alone who was 65 years of age or older. The average household size was 2.35 and the average family size was 3.00.

In the village, the population was spread out, with 28.9% under the age of 18, 4.8% from 18 to 24, 28.1% from 25 to 44, 21.9% from 45 to 64, and 16.2% who were 65 years of age or older. The median age was 36 years. For every 100 females, there were 86.9 males. For every 100 females age 18 and over, there were 76.1 males.

As of 2000 the median income for a household in the village was $30,250, and the median income for a family was $33,750. Males had a median income of $31,563 versus $17,000 for females. The per capita income for the village was $13,032. About 9.1% of families and 12.2% of the population were below the poverty line, including 15.2% of those under the age of eighteen and 16.7% of those 65 or over.
