= Christ Episcopal Church (Elizabethtown, Kentucky) =

Historic church in Kentucky, United States

- U.S. National Register of Historic Places
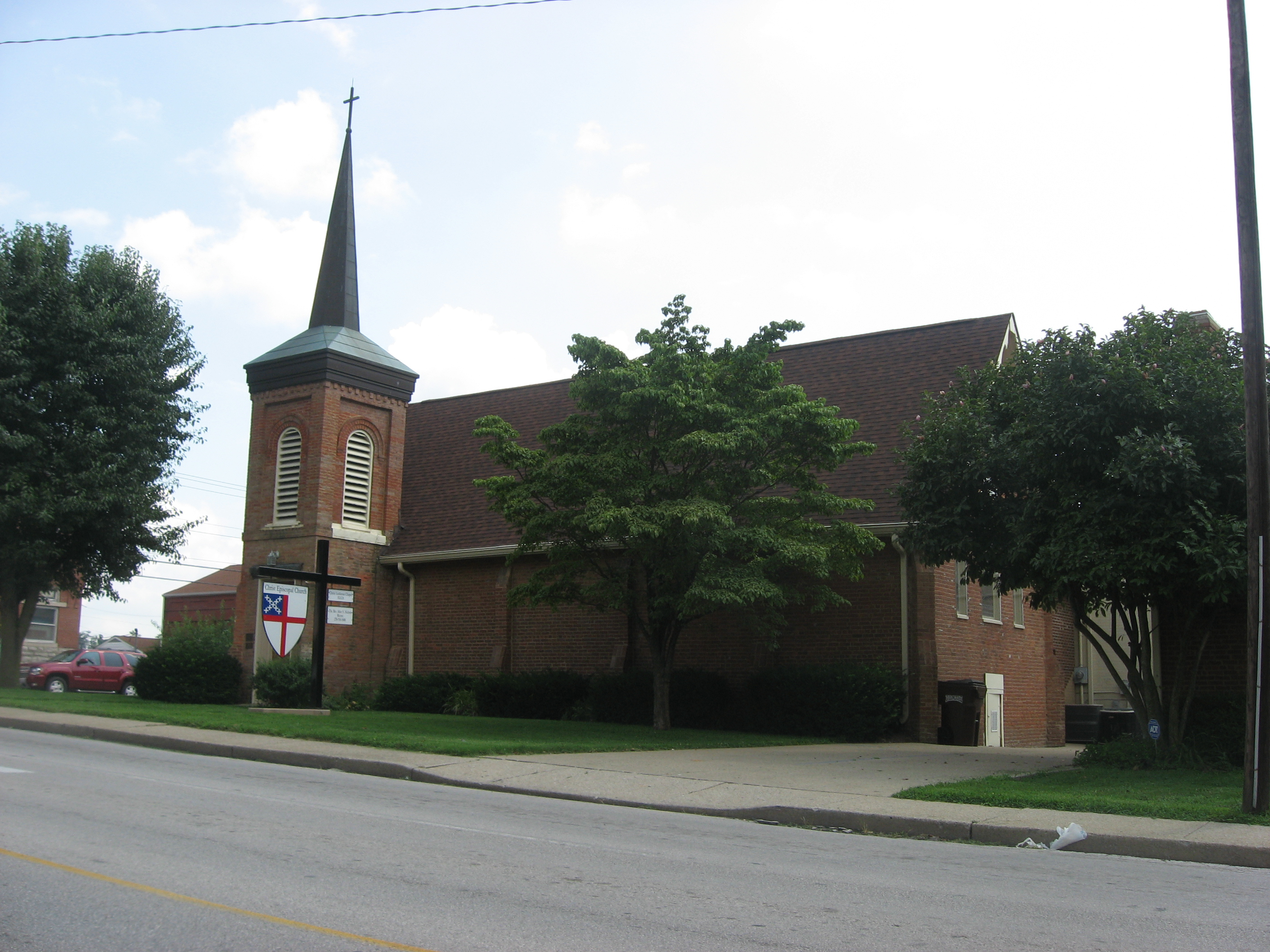
- Front and side of the church

- Location within Kentucky Location within the United States
- Location: Poplar St., Elizabethtown, Kentucky
- Coordinates: 37°41′42″N 85°51′29″W
- Area: less than one acre
- Built: 1850, 1877
- Architectural style: Gothic Revival, Romanesque Revival
- MPS: Hardin County MRA
- NRHP reference No.: 88001792
- Added to NRHP: October 4, 1988

The Christ Episcopal Church in Elizabethtown, Kentucky, is a historic church on Poplar Street. The church was built in 1850 and added to the National Register in 1988.

It is a one-story Gothic Revival-style church with buttresses on all four facades. A Romanesque Revival-style tower was added in 1877. A one-story brick parish house was built on the southern facade of the church in 1955. The church is the best example of Gothic Revival architecture in Hardin county. The church has maintained little renovations and possesses most of the original work.

Before the year 1840, there was no local Episcopal community. However, in that year a man named Rt. Reverend Benjamin Bosworth Smith visited Elizabethtown. His stay encouraged a community of local Episcopalians. The group met on an infrequent basis from the years from 1840 till 1850. Bishop Smith purchased land and materials to start construction on a church. The church operated all the way through the Civil War. The church had trouble gaining members in the 1930s and was held up by eight women. However, modern-day attendance has a membership of 140 people and 70 members in regular attendance.
