= Christ Episcopal Church (Sidney, Nebraska) =

Historic church in Nebraska, United States

- U.S. National Register of Historic Places
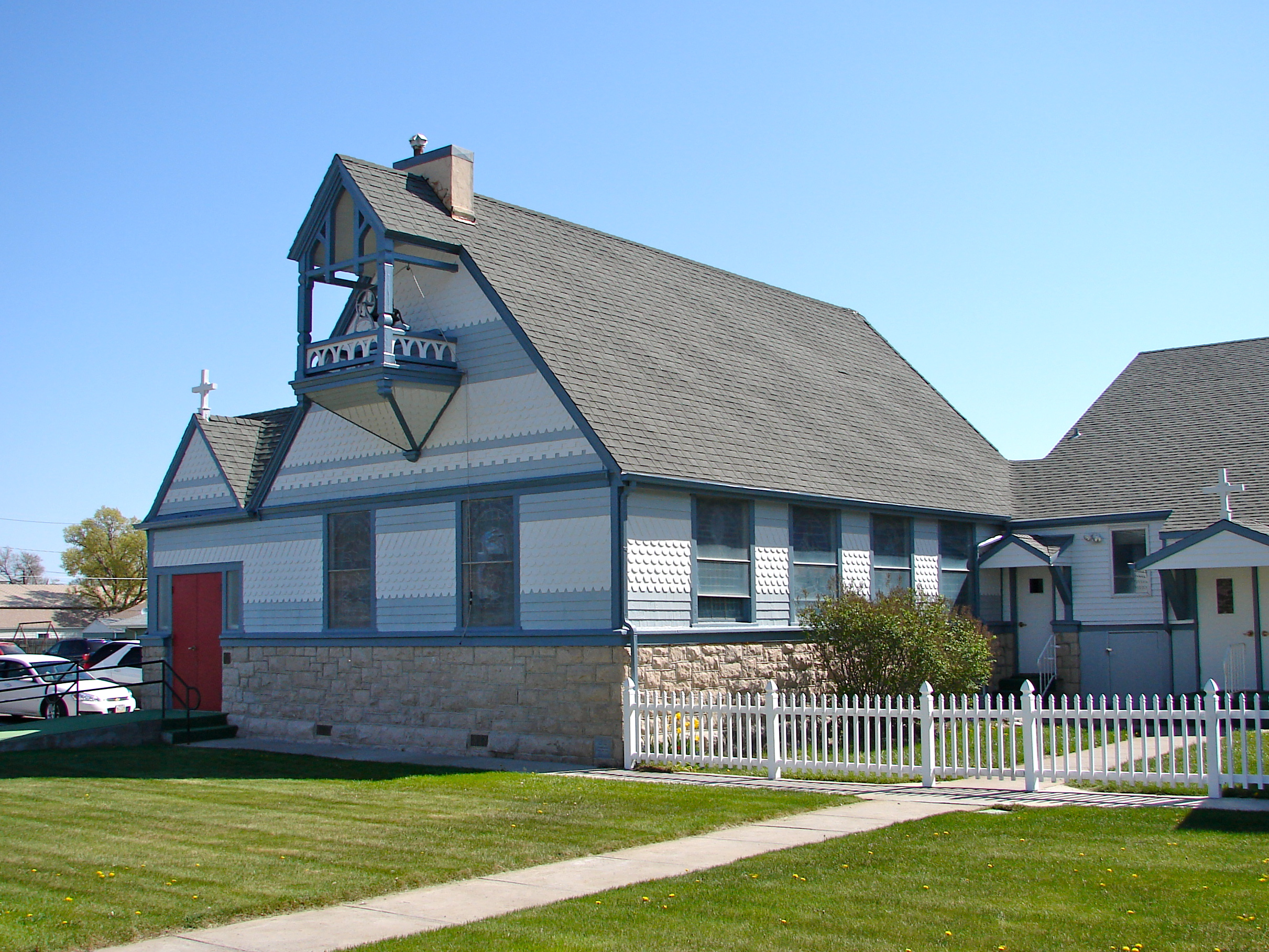

- Location within Nebraska Location within the United States
- Location: Jct. of 10th Ave. and Linden St., Sidney, Nebraska
- Coordinates: 41°8′30″N 102°58′32″W
- Area: less than one acre
- Built: 1886-87
- Architectural style: Shingle Style
- NRHP reference No.: 94001232
- Added to NRHP: October 21, 1994

The Christ Episcopal Church, at junction of 10th Ave. and Linden St. in Sidney, Nebraska, is a historic Shingle Style church that was built during 1886–87. Christ Church is a congregation of the Episcopal Diocese of Nebraska.

In 2015, the church reported 26 members; in 2023, it reported four members. No membership statistics were reported in 2024 national parochial reports. Average Sunday Attendance (ASA) reported in 2024 was four persons. This was a relative decrease from ASA of 14 reported in 2015.

Plate and pledge financial support reported by the church in 2024 was $1,020.

== Building and history ==
The building was listed on the National Register of Historic Places (NRHP) in 1994; the listing included the church as a contributing building and a 1950 rectory as a non-contributing building.

It is significant as "one of a few remaining physical representations in the state that is closely associated with the government's attempt to integrate Native Americans into the army and consequentially adopt Euro-American social mores. The church was used by, among others, Company I, Twenty-First Infantry which was composed of Native Americans and commanded by a white officer." Company I was posted at Fort Sidney during 1892 to 1894, the period of significance designated for the church in the NRHP listing.
