= Downtown Bessemer Historic District =

- U.S. National Register of Historic Places
- Location within Alabama
- Interactive map showing the location of Downtown Bessemer Historic District
- Location: Roughly bounded by 21st St. N., Carolina Ave., 19th St. N., 5th Ave. N. and the Southern RR tracks, Bessemer, Alabama
- Coordinates: 33°24′08″N 86°57′05″W
- Area: 26 acres (11 ha)
- Architectural style: Classical Revival, Modern Movement, Late 19th-century commercial
- NRHP reference No.: 92000852
- Added to NRHP: July 15, 1992

The Downtown Bessemer Historic District, in Bessemer, Alabama, is a historic district which was listed on the National Register of Historic Places in 1992. The listing included 70 contributing buildings on 26 acres (11 ha).

The district is roughly bounded by 21st St., N., Carolina Ave., 19th St., N., 5th Ave., N. and the former Southern railroad tracks. Besides the 70 contributing buildings, it also included 71 non-contributing buildings and six non-contributing sites.

Some of the sites are:

- the former Southern Railway Terminal Station (1916), 1905 Alabama Avenue, which was already separately listed on the National Register. Later became the "Bessemer Hall of History", a museum. It is a Prairie Style-influenced brick railroad passenger station.
- Bessemer City Hall (1938–41), 1800 Third Avenue., a three-story buff brick building built in a modified Art Deco style, as a Works Progress Administration project. It has a square corner clock tower with the old City Hall's 1890 clock. It includes the City Auditorium.

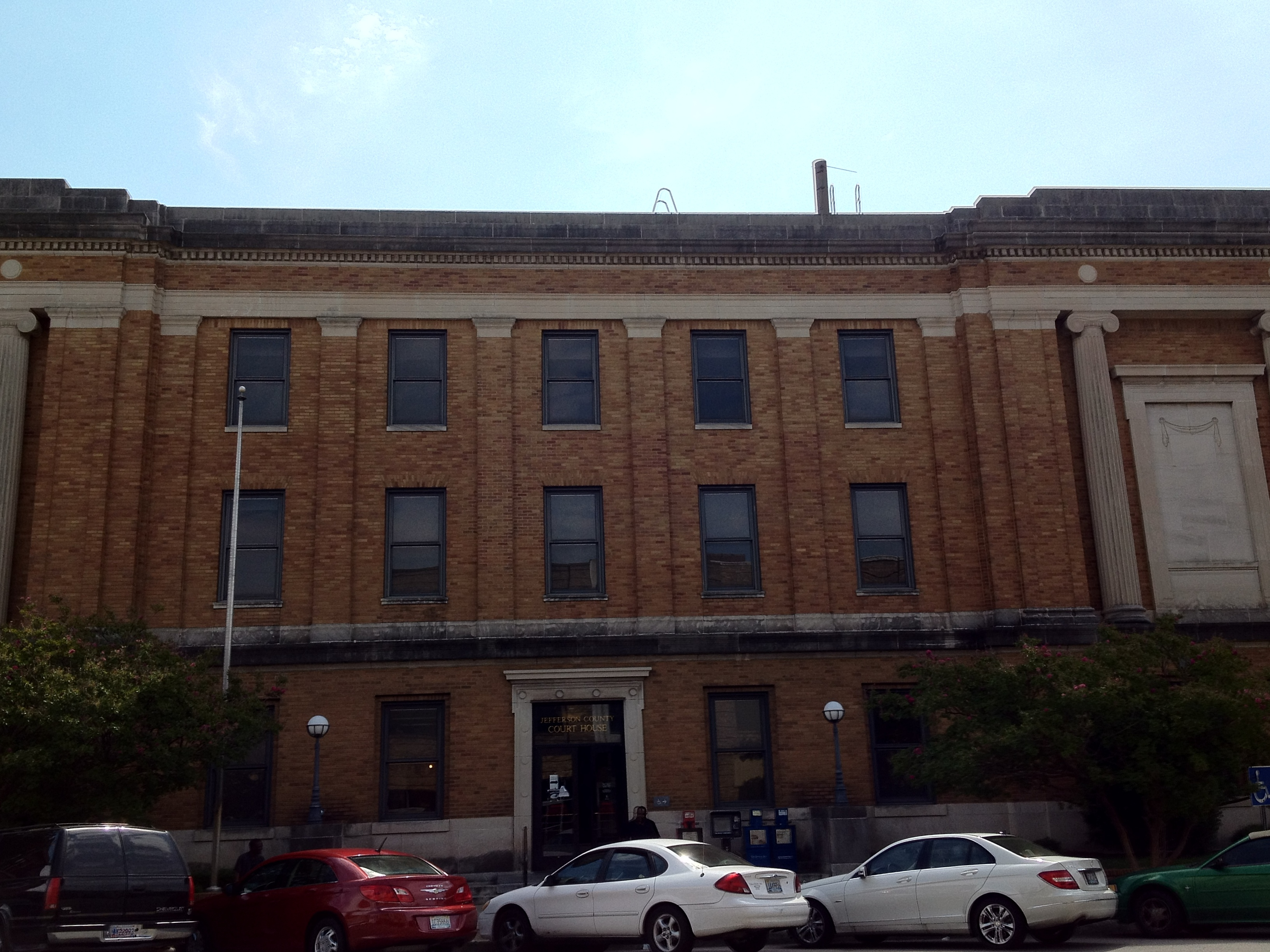
Jefferson County Courthouse

- Jefferson County Courthouse (1919), 1801 Third Avenue, a three-story buff brick building with "the enframed block design popular in the early decades of the 20th century, especially for government buildings". Its "end bays project slightly with recessed panels and inset Ionic columns; five bays in central section between that are defined by slightly projecting piers."
- Berney Bank Block (1887), with Richardsonian Romanesque features
- Alabama Power Building (1926)
