= Lodgepole, Nebraska =

- Village
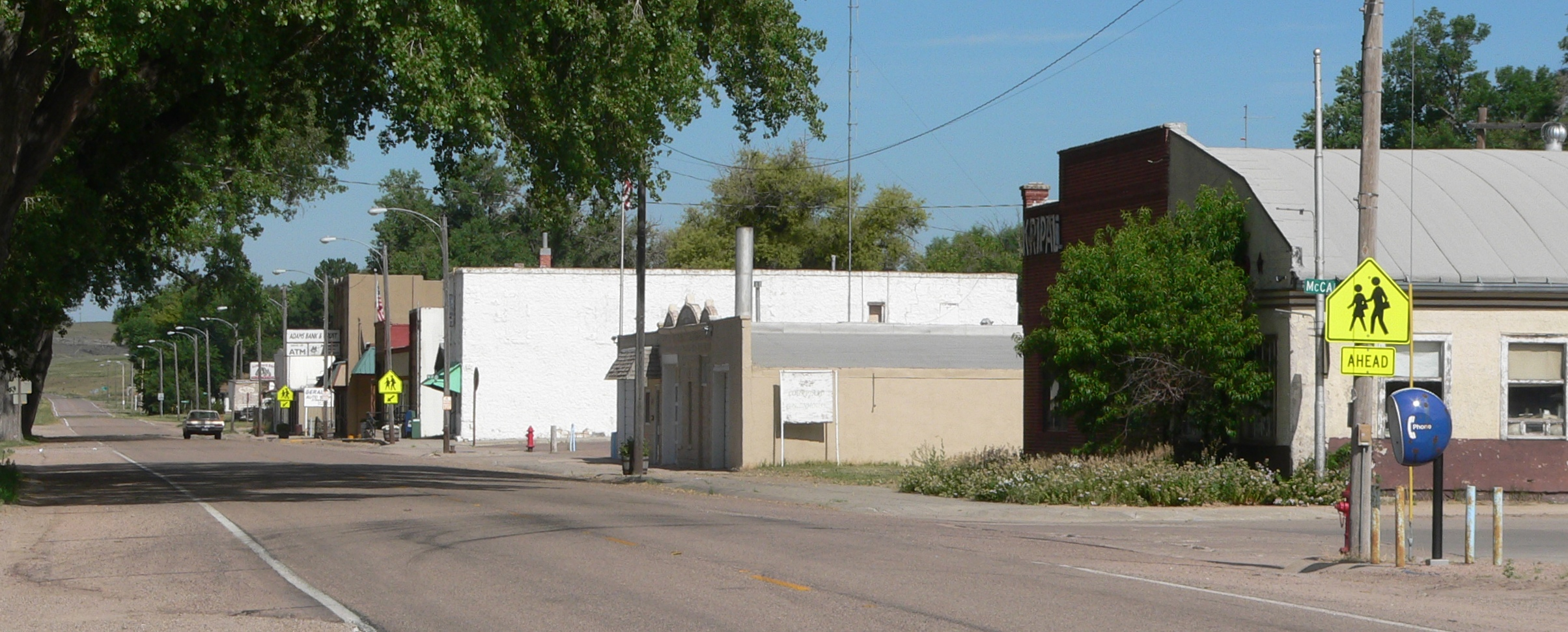

- Location of Lodgepole, Nebraska
- Coordinates: 41°08′56″N 102°38′19″W
- Country: United States
- State: Nebraska
- County: Cheyenne

Area
  - Total: 0.48 sq mi (1.24 km^{2})
  - Land: 0.48 sq mi (1.24 km^{2})
  - Water: 0 sq mi (0.00 km^{2})
- Elevation: 3,832 ft (1,168 m)

Population (2020)
  - Total: 312
  - Density: 653.7/sq mi (252.38/km^{2})
- Time zone: UTC-7 (Mountain (MST))
  - Summer (DST): UTC-6 (MDT)
- ZIP code: 69149
- Area code: 308
- FIPS code: 31-28420
- GNIS feature ID: 2398465
- Website: lodgepolene.com

Lodgepole is a village in Cheyenne County, Nebraska, United States. As of the 2020 census, Lodgepole had a population of 312.

== History ==
Lodgepole was founded in 1867 when the Union Pacific Railroad was extended to that point. It took its name from Lodgepole Creek, where it was assumed the Native Americans had cut trees to make poles for their lodges.

== Geography ==
According to the United States Census Bureau, the village has a total area of 0.48 square miles (1.24 km^{2}), all land.

=== Climate ===
Climate data for Lodgepole, Nebraska (1991–2020 normals, extremes 1894–present)
Month	Jan	Feb	Mar	Apr	May	Jun	Jul	Aug	Sep	Oct	Nov	Dec	Year
Record high °F (°C)	72 (22)	77 (25)	86 (30)	96 (36)	99 (37)	108 (42)	112 (44)	108 (42)	103 (39)	96 (36)	84 (29)	76 (24)	112 (44)
Mean maximum °F (°C)	61.5 (16.4)	65.8 (18.8)	76.0 (24.4)	83.7 (28.7)	91.3 (32.9)	98.3 (36.8)	102.2 (39.0)	99.9 (37.7)	95.6 (35.3)	85.4 (29.7)	73.0 (22.8)	62.3 (16.8)	102.7 (39.3)
Mean daily maximum °F (°C)	39.8 (4.3)	42.5 (5.8)	52.8 (11.6)	60.9 (16.1)	70.5 (21.4)	82.9 (28.3)	90.4 (32.4)	87.8 (31.0)	79.0 (26.1)	64.3 (17.9)	50.4 (10.2)	40.2 (4.6)	63.5 (17.5)
Daily mean °F (°C)	26.8 (−2.9)	29.1 (−1.6)	38.3 (3.5)	46.4 (8.0)	56.8 (13.8)	68.4 (20.2)	75.3 (24.1)	72.7 (22.6)	63.0 (17.2)	49.0 (9.4)	36.4 (2.4)	27.3 (−2.6)	49.1 (9.5)
Mean daily minimum °F (°C)	13.8 (−10.1)	15.8 (−9.0)	23.8 (−4.6)	31.9 (−0.1)	43.0 (6.1)	54.0 (12.2)	60.1 (15.6)	57.5 (14.2)	47.1 (8.4)	33.7 (0.9)	22.4 (−5.3)	14.3 (−9.8)	34.8 (1.6)
Mean minimum °F (°C)	−6.6 (−21.4)	−3.1 (−19.5)	6.2 (−14.3)	18.5 (−7.5)	28.5 (−1.9)	41.8 (5.4)	50.7 (10.4)	47.6 (8.7)	33.8 (1.0)	17.4 (−8.1)	4.3 (−15.4)	−4.5 (−20.3)	−13.4 (−25.2)
Record low °F (°C)	−31 (−35)	−36 (−38)	−23 (−31)	−7 (−22)	10 (−12)	29 (−2)	37 (3)	35 (2)	17 (−8)	−5 (−21)	−22 (−30)	−34 (−37)	−36 (−38)
Average precipitation inches (mm)	0.28 (7.1)	0.40 (10)	0.96 (24)	1.90 (48)	2.62 (67)	3.02 (77)	2.51 (64)	2.28 (58)	1.48 (38)	1.28 (33)	0.47 (12)	0.35 (8.9)	17.55 (446)
Average snowfall inches (cm)	4.4 (11)	4.2 (11)	5.9 (15)	2.6 (6.6)	0.3 (0.76)	0.0 (0.0)	0.0 (0.0)	0.0 (0.0)	0.1 (0.25)	0.7 (1.8)	4.4 (11)	5.3 (13)	27.9 (71)
Average precipitation days (≥ 0.01 in)	2.8	3.3	5.2	6.2	8.5	9.2	6.5	6.5	5.0	5.0	3.2	2.4	63.8
Average snowy days (≥ 0.1 in)	2.0	2.4	2.6	1.2	0.1	0.0	0.0	0.0	0.1	0.3	1.5	2.2	12.4
Source: NOAA

== Demographics ==
Historical population
Census	Pop.	Note	%±
1910	245		—
1920	451		84.1%
1930	436		−3.3%
1940	479		9.9%
1950	555		15.9%
1960	492		−11.4%
1970	407		−17.3%
1980	413		1.5%
1990	368		−10.9%
2000	348		−5.4%
2010	318		−8.6%
2020	312		−1.9%
U.S. Decennial Census

=== 2010 census ===
As of the census of 2010, there were 318 people, 157 households, and 95 families residing in the village. The population density was 662.5 inhabitants per square mile (255.8/km^{2}). There were 185 housing units at an average density of 385.4 per square mile (148.8/km^{2}). The racial makeup of the village was 98.1% White, 0.9% from other races, and 0.9% from two or more races. Hispanic or Latino of any race were 4.4% of the population.

There were 157 households, of which 19.7% had children under the age of 18 living with them, 48.4% were married couples living together, 5.7% had a female householder with no husband present, 6.4% had a male householder with no wife present, and 39.5% were non-families. 35.7% of all households were made up of individuals, and 17.2% had someone living alone who was 65 years of age or older. The average household size was 2.03 and the average family size was 2.56.

The median age in the village was 50.6 years. 17.3% of residents were under the age of 18; 2.8% were between the ages of 18 and 24; 21.1% were from 25 to 44; 37.7% were from 45 to 64; and 21.1% were 65 years of age or older. The gender makeup of the village was 53.5% male and 46.5% female.

=== 2000 census ===
As of the census of 2000, there were 348 people, 158 households, and 102 families residing in the village. The population density was 738.1 inhabitants per square mile (285.0/km^{2}). There were 188 housing units at an average density of 398.7 per square mile (153.9/km^{2}). The racial makeup of the village was 99.14% White, 0.57% Native American and 0.29% Asian. Hispanic or Latino of any race were 3.45% of the population.

There were 158 households, out of which 22.2% had children under the age of 18 living with them, 53.8% were married couples living together, 8.9% had a female householder with no husband present, and 35.4% were non-families. 32.9% of all households were made up of individuals, and 20.3% had someone living alone who was 65 years of age or older. The average household size was 2.20 and the average family size was 2.75.

In the village, the population was spread out, with 20.4% under the age of 18, 7.8% from 18 to 24, 22.1% from 25 to 44, 26.4% from 45 to 64, and 23.3% who were 65 years of age or older. The median age was 45 years. For every 100 females, there were 102.3 males. For every 100 females age 18 and over, there were 87.2 males.

As of 2000 the median income for a household in the village was $27,386, and the median income for a family was $33,516. Males had a median income of $26,667 versus $16,944 for females. The per capita income for the village was $16,147. About 11.1% of families and 12.5% of the population were below the poverty line, including 12.8% of those under age 18 and 14.4% of those age 65 or over.
