= Leon County, Florida =

County in Florida, United States

- County
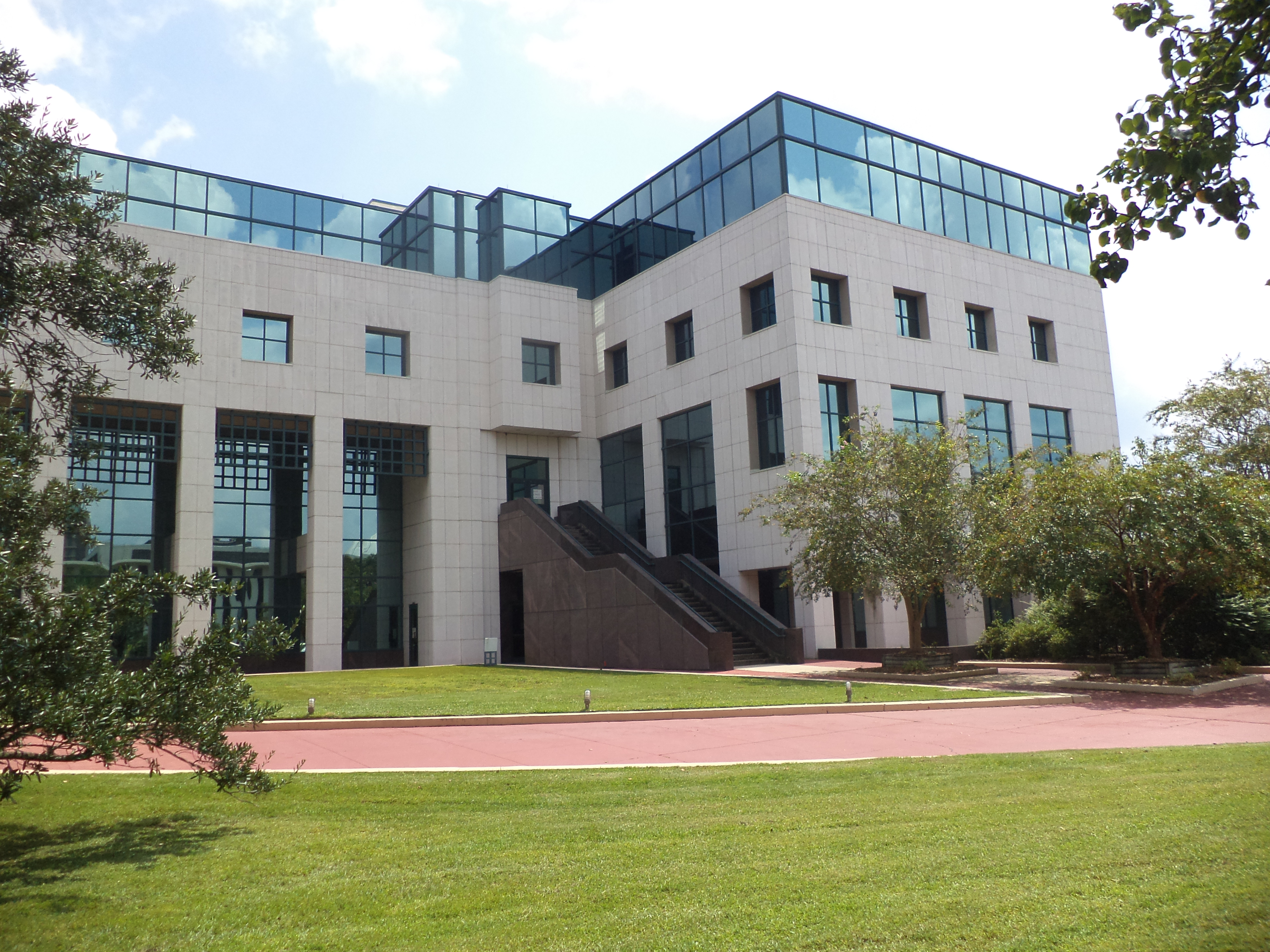
- Leon County Courthouse

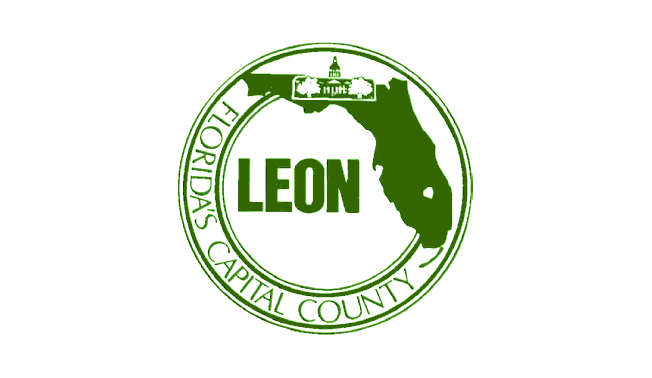
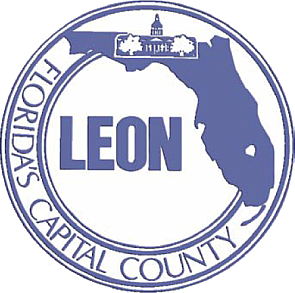
- Flag Seal

- Location within the U.S. state of Florida
- Coordinates: 30°28′N 84°17′W
- Country: United States
- State: Florida
- Founded: December 29, 1824
- Named for: Juan Ponce de León
- Seat: Tallahassee
- Largest city: Tallahassee

Area
  - Total: 702 sq mi (1,820 km^{2})
  - Land: 667 sq mi (1,730 km^{2})
  - Water: 35 sq mi (91 km^{2}) 5.0%

Population (2020)
  - Total: 292,198
  - Estimate (2025): 299,048 ▲
  - Density: 438/sq mi (169/km^{2})
- Time zone: UTC−5 (Eastern)
  - Summer (DST): UTC−4 (EDT)
- Congressional district: 2nd
- Website: www.leoncountyfl.gov

Leon County is a county in the Panhandle of the U.S. state of Florida. It was named after the Spanish explorer Juan Ponce de León. As of the 2020 census, the population was 292,198. The county seat is Tallahassee, which is also the state capital and home to many politicians, lobbyists, jurists, and attorneys. Leon County is included in the Tallahassee, Florida Metropolitan Statistical Area. Tallahassee is home to two of Florida's major public universities, Florida State University and Florida A&M University, as well as Tallahassee State College. Together these institutions have a combined enrollment of more than 70,000 students. It was an area of cotton cultivation. About 30 percent of Leon County is African American. The area includes red rolling hills.

== History ==
Originally part of Escambia and later Gadsden County, Leon County was created in 1824. It was named after Juan Ponce de León, the Spanish explorer who was the first European to reach Florida. The United States finally acquired this territory in the 19th century. In the 1830s, it attempted to conduct Indian Removal of the Seminole and Creek peoples, who had migrated south to escape European-American encroachment in Georgia and Alabama. After many Seminole were forcibly removed from the area or moved south to the Everglades during the Seminole Wars, planters developed cotton plantations based on enslaved labor.

By the 1850s and 1860s, Leon County had become part of the Deep South's "cotton kingdom". It ranked fifth of all Florida and Georgia counties in cotton production from the 20 major plantations. Uniquely among Confederate capitals east of the Mississippi River, in the American Civil War Tallahassee was never captured by Union forces. No Union soldiers set foot in Leon County until the Reconstruction Era.

== Geography ==
According to the U.S. Census Bureau, the county has an area of 702 square miles (1,820 km^{2}), of which 667 square miles (1,730 km^{2}) are land and 35 square miles (91 km^{2}) (5.0%) are water. Unlike much of Florida, most of Leon County has rolling hills, as part of Florida's Red Hills Region. The highest point is 280 feet (85 m), in the northern part of the county.

=== Geology ===
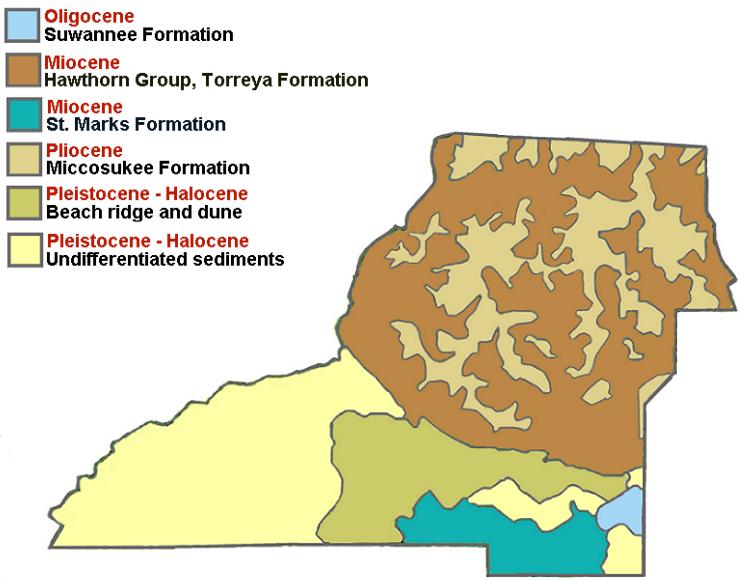
Geological make-up of Leon County

Leon County encompasses basement rock composed of basalts of the Triassic and Jurassic from ~251 to 145 million years ago interlayered with Mesozoic sedimentary rocks. The layers above the basement are carbonate rock created from dying foraminifera, bryozoa, mollusks, and corals from as early as the Paleocene, a period of ~66—55.8 Ma.

During the Eocene (~55.8—33.9 Ma) and Oligocene (~33.9—23 Ma), the Appalachian Mountains began to uplift and the erosion rate increased enough to fill the Gulf Trough with quartz sands, silts, and clays via rivers and streams. The first sedimentation layer in Leon County is the Oligocene Suwannee Limestone in the southeastern part of the county as stated by the United States Geological Survey and Florida Geological Survey.

The Early Miocene (~23.03—15.7 Ma) sedimentation in Leon County is Hawthorn Group, Torreya Formation and St. Marks Formation and is found in the northern two-thirds of the county.

The Pliocene (~5.332—2.588 Ma) is represented by the Miccosukee Formation scattered within the Torreya Formation.

Sediments were laid down from the Pleistocene epoch (~2.588 million—12 000 years ago) through the Holocene epoch (~12,000—present) and are designated Beach ridge and trail and undifferentiated sediments.

==== Terraces and shorelines ====
During the Pleistocene, what would be Leon County emerged and submerged with each glacial and interglacial period. Interglacials created the county's topography.

Also See Leon County Pleistocene coastal terraces

Also see: Florida Platform and Lithostratigraphy

==== Geologic formations ====
- Red Hills Region (North)
- Cody Scarp (central)
- Woodville Karst Plain (South)

==== Paleontology ====
Three sites in Leon County have yielded fossil remnants of the Miocene epoch.

=== National protected area ===
- Apalachicola National Forest (part)

=== State parks ===
- Lake Talquin State Park
- Alfred B. Maclay Gardens State Park
- Ney Landrum State Park

=== County parks and preserves ===
The Leon County Parks & Recreation department manages 56 facilities including 31 picnic areas, 18 playgrounds, 2 campgrounds, 24 boat ramps, 3 dog parks, 14 athletic facilities, 6 multi-purpose fields, 8 community centers and 6 greenways totalling more than 3,400 acres (1,400 ha), 16 buildings plus over 50 miles (80 km) of trails.

- The county owns 1,300 acres (530 ha) of open space, forest and woodlands between the Miccosukee Canopy Road Greenway and J.R. Alford Greenway.
- Apalachee Regional Park was specifically designed for cross-country running, one of just a few nationwide. It has hosted high school, college and world championship competitions. There are also four grass fields with football field goals, two of which are lighted. They are used for football, soccer and lacrosse. The parking area can accommodate 3,500 vehicles.

=== Canopy roads ===
Tallahassee and Leon County are notable for their canopy roads. The residents appreciate them and they offer a tranquil alternative to the normal city expanse of asphalt, cement and signs. Tallahassee/Leon has nine "officially designated" canopy roads that contribute greatly to the southern charm of the area.

=== Bodies of water ===
- Lake Miccosukee
- Black Creek
- Lake Bradford
- Lake Ella
- Lake Hall
- Lake Iamonia
- Lake Jackson
- Lake Lafayette
- Lake Talquin
- Ochlockonee River
- Lake Munson

=== Adjacent counties ===
- Grady County, Georgia - north
- Thomas County, Georgia - northeast
- Jefferson County - east
- Wakulla County - south
- Gadsden County - west
- Liberty County - west

== Demographics ==
Historical population
Census	Pop.	Note	%±
1830	6,494		—
1840	10,713		65.0%
1850	11,442		6.8%
1860	12,343		7.9%
1870	15,236		23.4%
1880	19,662		29.0%
1890	17,752		−9.7%
1900	19,887		12.0%
1910	19,427		−2.3%
1920	18,059		−7.0%
1930	23,476		30.0%
1940	31,646		34.8%
1950	51,590		63.0%
1960	74,225		43.9%
1970	103,047		38.8%
1980	148,655		44.3%
1990	192,493		29.5%
2000	239,452		24.4%
2010	275,487		15.0%
2020	292,198		6.1%
2025 (est.)	299,048	▲	2.3%
U.S. Decennial Census; 1790-1960 1900-1990; 1990-2000 2010-2019

=== 2020 census ===
Leon County, Florida – Racial and ethnic composition Note: the US Census treats Hispanic/Latino as an ethnic category. This table excludes Latinos from the racial categories and assigns them to a separate category. Hispanics/Latinos may be of any race.
Race / Ethnicity (NH = Non-Hispanic)	Pop 1980	Pop 1990	Pop 2000	Pop 2010	Pop 2020	% 1980	% 1990	% 2000	% 2010	% 2020
White alone (NH)	108,104	138,396	153,474	163,483	157,458	72.72%	71.90%	64.09%	59.34%	53.89%
Black or African American alone (NH)	36,327	46,191	69,049	82,386	87,503	24.44%	24.00%	28.84%	29.91%	29.95%
Native American or Alaska Native alone (NH)	264	471	634	681	631	0.18%	0.24%	0.26%	0.25%	0.22%
Asian alone (NH)	985	2,625	4,507	7,950	10,465	0.66%	1.36%	1.88%	2.89%	3.58%
Native Hawaiian or Pacific Islander alone (NH)	x	x	98	121	155	x	x	0.04%	0.04%	0.05%
Other race alone (NH)	546	95	322	511	1,261	0.37%	0.05%	0.13%	0.19%	0.43%
Mixed race or Multiracial (NH)	x	x	2,961	4,994	11,811	x	x	1.24%	1.81%	4.04%
Hispanic or Latino (any race)	2,429	4,715	8,407	15,361	22,914	1.63%	2.45%	3.51%	5.58%	7.84%
Total	148,655	192,493	239,452	275,487	292,198	100.00%	100.00%	100.00%	100.00%	100.00%

As of the 2020 census, there were 292,198 people, 121,085 households, and 61,961 families residing in the county. The median age was 33.1 years; 19.0% of residents were under the age of 18 and 14.7% of residents were 65 years of age or older. For every 100 females there were 89.4 males, and for every 100 females age 18 and over there were 86.5 males age 18 and over.

The racial makeup of the county was 56.1% White, 30.4% Black or African American, 0.3% American Indian and Alaska Native, 3.6% Asian, 0.1% Native Hawaiian and Pacific Islander, 2.1% from some other race, and 7.4% from two or more races. Hispanic or Latino residents of any race comprised 7.8% of the population.

86.6% of residents lived in urban areas, while 13.4% lived in rural areas.

There were 121,085 households in the county, of which 25.2% had children under the age of 18 living in them. Of all households, 35.4% were married-couple households, 23.2% were households with a male householder and no spouse or partner present, and 34.9% were households with a female householder and no spouse or partner present. About 33.2% of all households were made up of individuals and 9.7% had someone living alone who was 65 years of age or older.

There were 133,478 housing units, of which 9.3% were vacant. Among occupied housing units, 51.2% were owner-occupied and 48.8% were renter-occupied. The homeowner vacancy rate was 1.6% and the rental vacancy rate was 9.2%.

=== 2010 census ===
==== Race ====
As of the census of 2010, there were 275,487 people, and 108,592 households residing in the county. The population density was 413.2 inhabitants per square mile (159.5/km^{2}). There were 123,423 housing units at an average density of 185 per square mile (71/km^{2}). The racial makeup of the county was 63.0% White, 30.3% Black or African American, 0.3% Native American, 2.9% Asian, 0.1% Pacific Islander, and 2.2% from two or more races. 5.6% of the population were Hispanic or Latino of any race.

==== Age ====
There were 108,592 households, out of which 24.2% had children under the age of 18 living with them, 36.9% were married couples living together, 13.1% had a female householder with no husband present, and 45.8% were non-families. 31.0% of all households were made up of individuals, and 6.1% had someone living alone who was 65 years of age or older. The average household size was 2.29 and the average family size was 2.92.

In the county, the population was spread out, with 20.0% under the age of 18, 26.3% from 18 to 24, 22.7% from 25 to 44, 22.4% from 45 to 64, and 8.7% who were 65 years of age or older. The median age was 27.8 years. For every 100 females, there were 91.57 males. For every 100 females age 18 and over, there were 89.03 males.

==== Education ====
At 70.2%, Leon County enjoys the highest level of post-secondary education in the state of Florida, followed by Alachua County with a total of 67.8%.

Level of Education
Level	Leon Co.	Florida	U.S.
Some college or associate degree	28.5%	28.8%	27.4%
Bachelor's Degree	24.0%	14.3%	15.5%
Master's or Ph.D.	17.7%	8.1%	8.9%
Total	70.2%	51.2%	51.8%

Source of above:

==== Income ====
The median income for a household in the county was $37,517, and the median income for a family was $52,962. Males had a median income of $35,235 versus $28,110 for females. The per capita income for the county was $21,024. About 9.40% of families and 18.20% of the population were below the poverty line, including 16.20% of those under age 18 and 8.20% of those age 65 or over.

== Economy ==
The primary driver of Leon County's economy is government enterprises including state, county and city with $4.68 billion in value. Business and professional services was next at $3.24 billion, followed by real estate, leasing and rentals accounting for $2.77 billion. Education, health care and social services came in fourth with $2.05 billion and the fifth major contributor was information services worth $1.26 billion. The last major sector was retail trade of $1.16 billion.

== Law, government, and politics ==
=== Politics ===
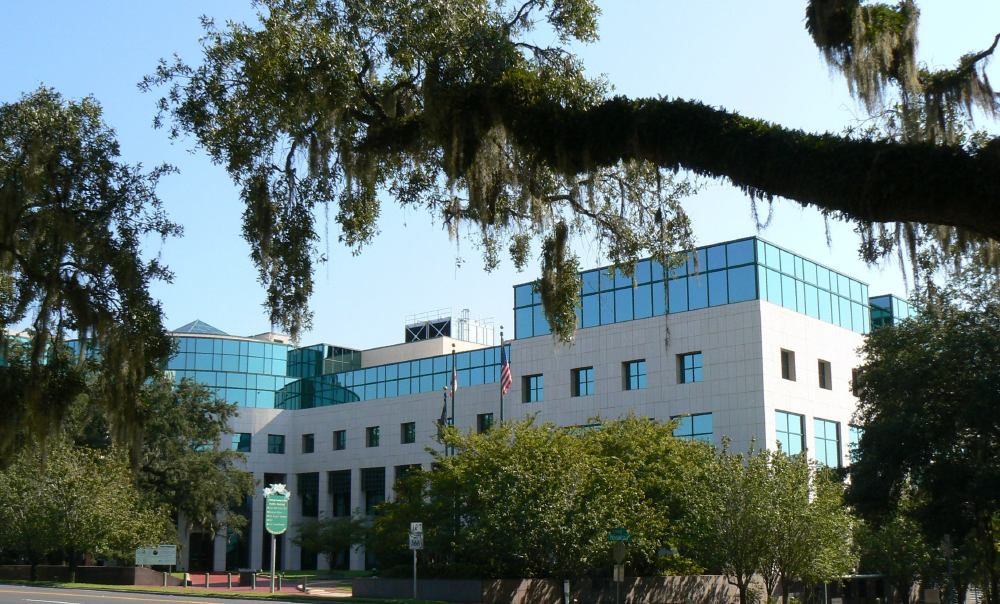
Leon County courthouse in Tallahassee; 2007

Leon County is governed by an elected seven-member board of county commissioners.

Following Reconstruction, white Democrats regained power in Leon County and voters have historically voted for Democratic candidates at the national level. Tallahassee is one of the few cities in the South known for progressive activism.

The county has voted Democratic in 24 of the past 29 presidential elections since 1904. Its political affiliations likely draw from the high number of students, staff, and faculty associated with Florida State University, Florida A&M University, and Tallahassee State College in Tallahassee, as well as the concentration of government employees.

Leon County has had the highest voter turnout of any Florida county. In the 2008 general election, it had a record-setting voter turnout of 85%, including early voting and voting by mail.

As of March 31, 2024, there were 98,612 Democrats, 54,464 Republicans, and 43,600 voters with other affiliations in Leon County.

United States presidential election results for Leon County, Florida
Year	Republican		Democratic		Third party(ies)	
Year	No.	%	No.	%	No.	%
1892	0	0.00%	634	100.00%	0	0.00%
1896	247	15.52%	1,298	81.53%	47	2.95%
1900	162	13.95%	932	80.28%	67	5.77%
1904	84	11.37%	649	87.82%	6	0.81%
1908	143	14.93%	698	72.86%	117	12.21%
1912	56	8.41%	546	81.98%	64	9.61%
1916	191	16.32%	875	74.79%	104	8.89%
1920	452	22.97%	1,412	71.75%	104	5.28%
1924	92	8.29%	947	85.32%	71	6.40%
1928	630	24.72%	1,888	74.07%	31	1.22%
1932	252	7.87%	2,950	92.13%	0	0.00%
1936	277	6.84%	3,770	93.16%	0	0.00%
1940	583	9.65%	5,459	90.35%	0	0.00%
1944	835	15.64%	4,505	84.36%	0	0.00%
1948	1,149	18.65%	3,607	58.55%	1,405	22.80%
1952	5,604	41.19%	8,000	58.81%	0	0.00%
1956	6,828	49.30%	7,022	50.70%	0	0.00%
1960	9,079	46.53%	10,433	53.47%	0	0.00%
1964	15,181	58.15%	10,927	41.85%	0	0.00%
1968	9,288	28.49%	10,440	32.02%	12,878	39.50%
1972	27,479	63.72%	15,555	36.07%	92	0.21%
1976	23,739	44.42%	28,729	53.76%	975	1.82%
1980	24,919	43.47%	28,450	49.63%	3,957	6.90%
1984	36,325	55.00%	29,683	44.94%	38	0.06%
1988	36,055	51.39%	33,472	47.71%	631	0.90%
1992	31,983	32.87%	47,791	49.12%	17,520	18.01%
1996	33,930	36.99%	50,072	54.59%	7,715	8.41%
2000	39,073	37.88%	61,444	59.57%	2,637	2.56%
2004	51,615	37.85%	83,873	61.50%	891	0.65%
2008	55,705	37.40%	91,747	61.60%	1,483	1.00%
2012	55,805	37.54%	90,881	61.13%	1,985	1.34%
2016	53,821	34.98%	92,068	59.83%	7,992	5.19%
2020	57,453	35.14%	103,517	63.32%	2,506	1.53%
2024	60,397	38.29%	94,520	59.93%	2,810	1.78%

==== County representation ====
Leon County Government
Position	Name	Party
Commissioner, At-Large	Nicholas J. Maddox	Democratic
Commissioner, At-Large	Carolyn D. Cummings	Democratic
Commissioner, Dist. 1	William C. Proctor	Democratic
Commissioner, Dist. 2	Christian Caban	Democratic
Commissioner, Dist. 3	W. Richard Minor	Democratic
Commissioner, Dist. 4	G. Brian Welch	Democratic
Commissioner, Dist. 5	David O'Keefe	Democratic
Supervisor of Elections	Mark Earley	Democratic
Tax Collector	Doris Maloy	Democratic
Property Appraiser	Akin Akinyemi	Democratic
Clerk of the Circuit Court	Gwendolyn M. Marshall	Democratic
Sheriff	Walt McNeil	Democratic
School Superintendent	James P. "Rocky" Hanna	Democratic

- Map of County Commission Districts

=== State representation ===
Allison Tant (D), District 9, represents Leon County's northern half, including most of Tallahassee. Jason Shoaf (R), District 7, represents the county's southern portion. He won office in a special election. Gallop Franklin (D), District 8, represents a west-central portion of the county.

==== State senator ====
All of Leon County is represented by Corey Simon (R), District 3, in the Florida Senate.

=== U.S. Congressional representation ===
Leon County is located in the 2nd congressional district after the 2020 census redistricting process was completed. It is currently represented by Neal Dunn (R).

=== Consolidation ===
Leon County voters have gone to the polls four times to vote on consolidation of the Tallahassee and Leon County governments into one jurisdiction. This proposal would combine police and other city services with the already shared (consolidated) Tallahassee Fire Department, Tallahassee/Leon County Planning Department, and Leon County Emergency Medical Services. Tallahassee's city limits would (at current size) increase from 98.2 square miles (254 km^{2}) to 702 square miles (1,820 km^{2}). Roughly 36 percent of Leon County's 250,000 residents live outside the Tallahassee city limits.

Leon County Voting On Consolidation
Year	For	Against
1971	10,381 (41.32%)	14,740 (58.68%)
1973	11,056 (46.23%)	12,859 (53.77%)
1976	20,336 (45.01%)	24,855 (54.99%)
1992	37,062 (39.8%)	56,070 (60.2%)

Proponents of consolidation have claimed that the new jurisdiction would attract business by its very size. Merging of governments would cut government waste, duplication of services, etc. Professor Richard Feiock of Florida State University found in a 2007 study that he could not conclude that consolidation would benefit the local economy.

== Public services ==
The Public Safety Complex at 911 Easterwood Drive is a joint venture between Leon County and the City of Tallahassee. The facility serves multiple purposes and was designed to withstand an F4 tornado or a Category 3 hurricane. It was completed in 2013 with a budget of almost $30 million using concrete forms and structural steel with brick masonry exteriors. Most of the 90,000 square feet (8,400 m^{2}) has raised flooring and laminated glass windows.

The site also contains an EMS logistics building and land for a future fire station.

The Consolidated Dispatch Agency (CDA) in the Public Safety Complex acts as a centralized hub for 911 calls, providing faster, more efficient emergency responses by uniting police, fire, and EMS. Key benefits include improved coordination between agencies, quicker processing of emergency calls, enhanced responder safety, and more accurate, faster dispatching of the closest units to crises.

In addition to the CDA, the building contains offices for the city's Regional Transportation Management, EMS, emergency operations and the fire department headquarters.

=== Law enforcement ===
- The Leon County Sheriff's Office provides police patrol and detective service for the unincorporated part of the county. The sheriff's office also provides court protection and operates the county jail.
- The Tallahassee Police Department provides policing for residents within the city limits of Tallahassee. Established in 1826, TPD is the country's third-longest-accredited law enforcement agency.

=== Fire & emergency protection ===
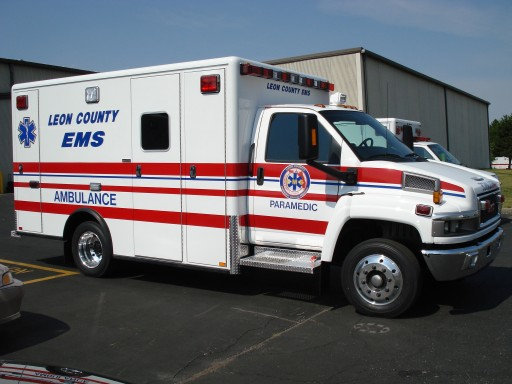
A Leon County EMS vehicle

- The Tallahassee Fire Department provides fire protection and emergency response for Tallahassee, as well as all unincorporated areas of Leon County. Six volunteer fire departments within unincorporated areas of Leon County supplement the response of Leon County EMS and the TFD and exist to provide more timely responses.
- Leon County Emergency Medical Services provides emergency response and transport using Advanced life support for all areas of Leon County including Tallahassee. Their headquarters is located in the Public Safety Complex.

=== Disasters ===
- The Leon County Emergency Operations Center is located in the Public Safety Complex. They prepare for and coordinate response to disasters.

=== Public health ===
The Florida Department of Health operates county health departments in all 67 of the state's counties.

=== Social services ===
The Florida Department of Children and Families provides social services in all 67 of the state's counties.

=== Leon County Public Works department ===
- Operations: drainage systems along county rights-of-way and easements, maintaining road shoulders, traffic signal and lighting maintenance, mosquito control
- Transportation Maintenance: asphalt repairs, maintenance of private/dirt roads, street signs and pavement markings
- Right of Way: litter control and roadside mowing
- Fleet management: vehicle repair & preventative maintenance

Note: Road construction and resurfacing is handled by private contractors

=== Water, sewer and stormwater ===
The City of Tallahassee Utilities department is responsible for water delivery, wastewater treatment, and stormwater management within the city limits. In unincorporated areas of Leon County, residents utilize private wells and septic systems.

== Education ==
=== Higher education ===
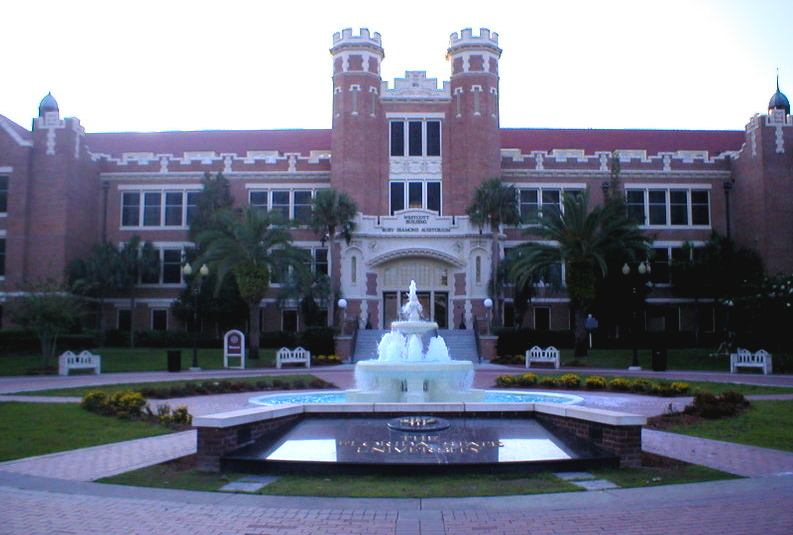
The Westcott Plaza at Florida State University

==== Florida State University ====
Florida State University (commonly called Florida State or FSU) is an American public space-grant and sea-grant research university. It has a 1,391.54-acre (5.631-km^{2}) campus in Tallahassee. In 2017, it had nearly 42,000 students. It is a senior member of the State University System of Florida. Founded in 1851, it is on Florida's oldest continuous site of higher education.

The university is classified as a Research University with Very High Research by the Carnegie Foundation for the Advancement of Teaching. It comprises 16 separate colleges and more than 110 centers, facilities, labs and institutes that offer more than 360 programs of study, including professional school programs. In 2022-23 the university had an operating budget of $2.36 billion set by the Florida State University Board of Trustees. Florida State is home to Florida's only National Laboratory, the National High Magnetic Field Laboratory. FSU also operates the John & Mable Ringling Museum of Art, the State Art Museum of Florida and one of the nation's largest museum/university complexes.

FSU is accredited by the Southern Association of Colleges and Schools (SACS). It is home to nationally ranked programs in many academic areas, including law, business, engineering, medicine, social policy, film, music, theater, dance, visual art, political science, psychology, social work, and the sciences.

For 2019, U.S. News & World Report ranked Florida State the country's 26th-best public university.

Florida Governor Rick Scott and the state legislature designated FSU one of two "preeminent" state universities in the spring of 2013 among the 12 universities of the State University System of Florida.

FSU's intercollegiate sports teams, commonly called the Seminoles, compete in National Collegiate Athletic Association (NCAA) Division I and the Atlantic Coast Conference (ACC).

==== Florida A&M University ====
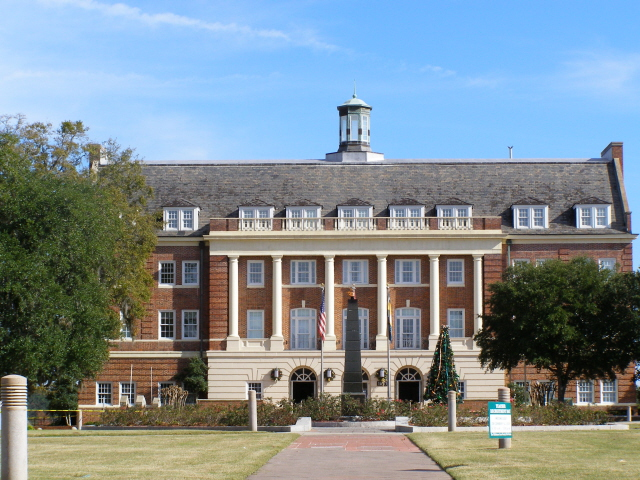
Florida A&M University's Lee Hall Auditorium

Founded on October 3, 1887, Florida A&M University (FAMU) is a public, historically black university that is part of the State University System of Florida and is accredited by the Southern Association of Colleges and Schools. FAMU's main campus comprises 156 buildings spread over 422 acres (1.7 km^{2}) on top of Tallahassee's highest geographic hill. In 2016 it had more than 9,600 students. FAMU also has several satellite campuses. Its College of Law is at its Orlando site, and its pharmacy program has sites in Miami, Jacksonville and Tampa. FAMU offers 54 bachelor's degrees and 29 master's degrees. It has 12 schools and colleges and one institute.

FAMU has 11 doctoral programs, including ten Ph.D. programs: chemical engineering, civil engineering, electrical engineering, mechanical engineering, industrial engineering, biomedical engineering, physics, pharmaceutical sciences, educational leadership, and environmental sciences. Top undergraduate programs are architecture, journalism, computer information sciences, and psychology. FAMU's top graduate programs include pharmaceutical sciences, public health, physical therapy, engineering, physics, master's of applied social sciences (especially history and public administration), business, and sociology.

==== Tallahassee State College ====
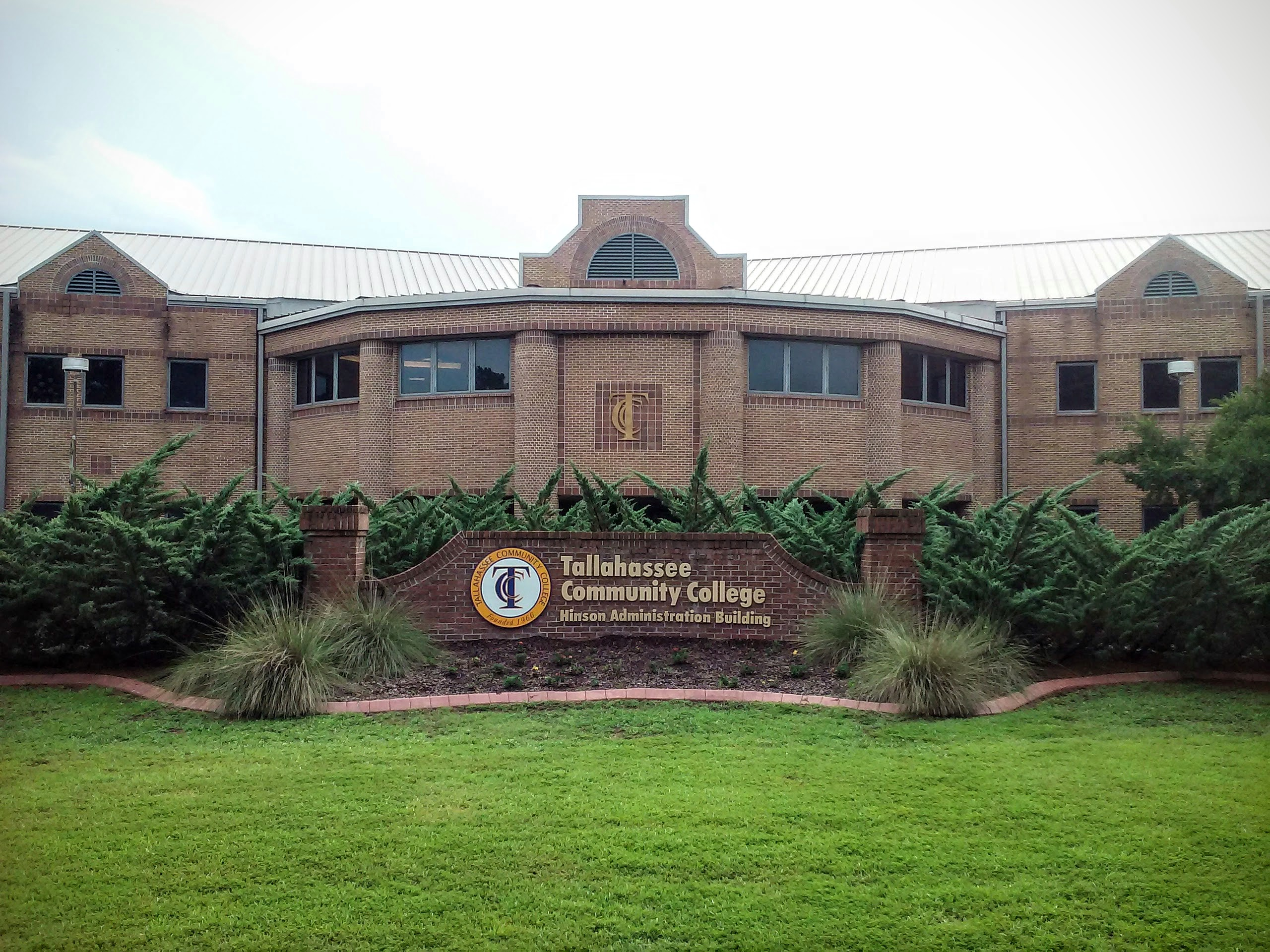
The Hinson Administration Building at Tallahassee State College

The Florida Legislature founded Tallahassee Junior College in 1966, renamed Tallahassee Community College in 1970, then Tallahassee State College in 2024.

TSC is a member of the Florida College System. It is accredited by the Florida Department of Education and the Southern Association of Colleges and Schools. Its primary site is a 270-acre (1.092 km2) campus in Tallahassee.

TSC offers Bachelor's of Science, Associate of Arts, Associate of Science, and Associate of Applied Sciences degrees. In 2013, it was 1st in the nation in graduating students with A.A. degrees. TSC is also the nation's #1 transfer school to Florida State University. As of 2015, TSC had 38,017 students.

In partnership with Florida State University, TSC offers the TSC2FSU program. This program provides guaranteed admission to FSU for TSC Associate in Arts degree graduates.

==== List of other colleges ====
- Barry University School of Adult and Continuing Education – Tallahassee Campus
- Embry-Riddle Aeronautical University
- Flagler College – Tallahassee Campus
- Keiser University – Tallahassee Campus
- Lewis M. Lively Area Vocational-Technical School
- Saint Leo University – Tallahassee Campus

=== Primary and secondary education ===
The Leon County School District administers and operates Leon County's public schools. LCS is operated by a superintendent, 5 board members, and 1 student representative. There are 25 elementary schools, 10 middle schools, seven high schools, eight special/alternative schools, and two charter schools.

==== List of middle schools ====
- Cobb Middle School
- Deerlake Middle School
- Fairview Middle School
- Fort Braden School K - 8
- Governor's Charter Academy (Charter K–8)
- Griffin Middle School
- Holy Comforter Episcopal School (Private PK3–8)
- Maclay School (Private PK3–12)
- Montford Middle School
- Nims Middle School
- Raa Middle School
- Success Academy of Tallahassee
- Swift Creek Middle School
- Stars Middle School (Charter)
- School of Arts and Sciences (Charter K–8)
- Tallahassee School of Math and Science (Charter K–8)
- Trinity Catholic School (Private PK3–8)
- Cornerstone Learning Community (Private PK3–8)

==== List of high schools ====
- Amos P. Godby High School
- Atlantis Academy
- Community Christian School
- Florida A&M University Developmental Research School
- Florida State University High School
- James S. Rickards High School
- John Paul II Catholic High School
- Lawton Chiles High School
- Leon High School
- Lincoln High School
- Lively Technical Center
- Maclay School
- North Florida Christian High School
- SAIL High School
- Woodland Hall Academy

=== Libraries ===
Leon County operates the Leroy Collins Leon County Public Library, with 7 branches serving the county:

- Leroy Collins Main Library
- Bruce J. Host Northeast Branch Library
- Eastside Branch Library
- Dr. B.L. Perry, Jr. Branch Library
- Lake Jackson Branch Library
- Woodville Branch Library
- Jane G. Sauls Fort Braden Branch Library

The Leon County Public Library was renamed in 1993 to honor LeRoy Collins, the 33rd governor of Florida.

==== History of library services ====
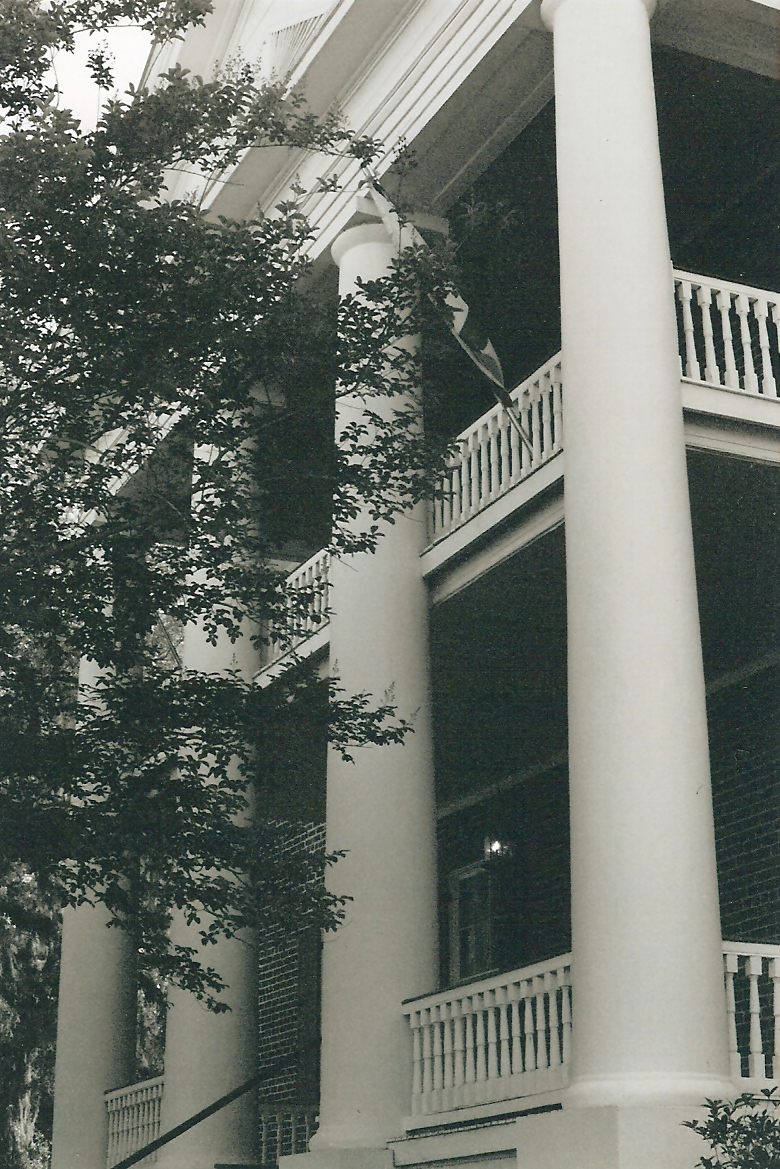
The James Madison Institute (known as "The Columns") was the first home of the Leon County Free Public Library.

The Carnegie Library of Tallahassee provided library services to the black community before desegregation. It was the first and only public library in Tallahassee until 1955. Philanthropist Andrew Carnegie offered Tallahassee money to build a public library in 1906. According to Africology: The Journal of Pan African Studies, the library was built on the FAMU campus because the city refused the donation because it would have to serve the black citizens. "The facility boasted modern amenities such as electricity, indoor plumbing and water supplied by the city. In later years, the Library served as an art gallery, religious center, and in 1976, became the founding home of the Black Archives Research Center and Museum. By functioning both as a repository for archival records and a museum for historical regalia, the center continues to render academic support to educational institutions, civic, political, religious and Museum. By functioning both as a repository for archival records and a museum for historical regalia, the center continues to render academic support to educational institutions, civic, political, religious and social groups, as well as, public and private businesses throughout Florida and the nation." The building was designed by noted architect William Augustus Edwards and was built in 1908. On November 17, 1978, it was added to the U.S. National Register of Historic Places.

The Carnegie Library of Tallahassee, which served only the black community, became the only free public library in the city until 1955. According to the Leon County Public Library's website, the American Association of University Women formed the Friends of the Library organization in 1954. The formation of the Friends of the Library was in direct response to the fact that "Tallahassee was the only state capital in the United States not offering free public library service." A year later, the library was established by legislative action and developed by citizens and civic groups. The first Leon County free public library opened on March 21, 1956. The first building to house the library was The Columns, one of the oldest remaining antebellum homes in the Leon County area, at Park Avenue and Adams Street (now the home of the James Madison Institute).

In order to expand library services, the Junior League of Tallahassee donated a bookmobile to the library. The vehicle was later donated to the Leon County Sheriff's Office to be used as a paddywagon for its Road Prison. In 1962, the library moved to the old Elks Club building at 127 North Monroe Street. Public transit in the city of Tallahassee had been desegregated by 1958, but the public library system was only integrated several years later.

In the early 1970s, Jefferson and Wakulla Counties joined the Leon County Public Library System, forming the Leon, Jefferson, and Wakulla County Public Library System. According to the library's website, "Leon County provided administrative and other services to the two smaller counties, while each supported the direct costs of their library services and their share of Leon's administrative costs." In 1975 the system started a branch library in Bond, a predominantly black community on the city's south side. Wakulla County left the library cooperative in 1975 to start its own library system and in 1978 the main library moved to Tallahassee's Northwood Mall. Jefferson County left the library cooperative in 1980 and the library reverted to the Leon County Public Library. In 1989, "ground breaking was held on March 4 for a new $8.5 million main library facility with 88,000 feet of space. The site was next door to the library's original home, The Columns, which had been moved in 1971 to 100 N. Duval." The new library had its grand opening in 1991 and was renamed in 1993 in honor of former Governor LeRoy Collins.

== Points of interest ==
- Alfred B. Maclay Gardens State Park
- Apalachicola National Forest
- Birdsong Nature Center
- Bradley's Country Store Complex
- Florida State Capitol
- Florida Supreme Court
- Florida State Archives
- Florida World War II, Korean War and Vietnam War Memorials
- Lake Jackson Mounds Archaeological State Park
- Leon County Fairgrounds
- Leon County's five canopy roads
- LeRoy Collins Leon County Public Library
- Mission San Luis de Apalachee
- Museum of Florida History
- Old Fort Park
- Tall Timbers Research Station
- Tallahassee Antique Car Museum
- Tallahassee Museum
- Tallahassee-St. Marks Historic Railroad Trail State Park

== Transportation ==
=== Airports ===
- Tallahassee Commercial Airport
- Tallahassee International Airport

=== Major highways ===
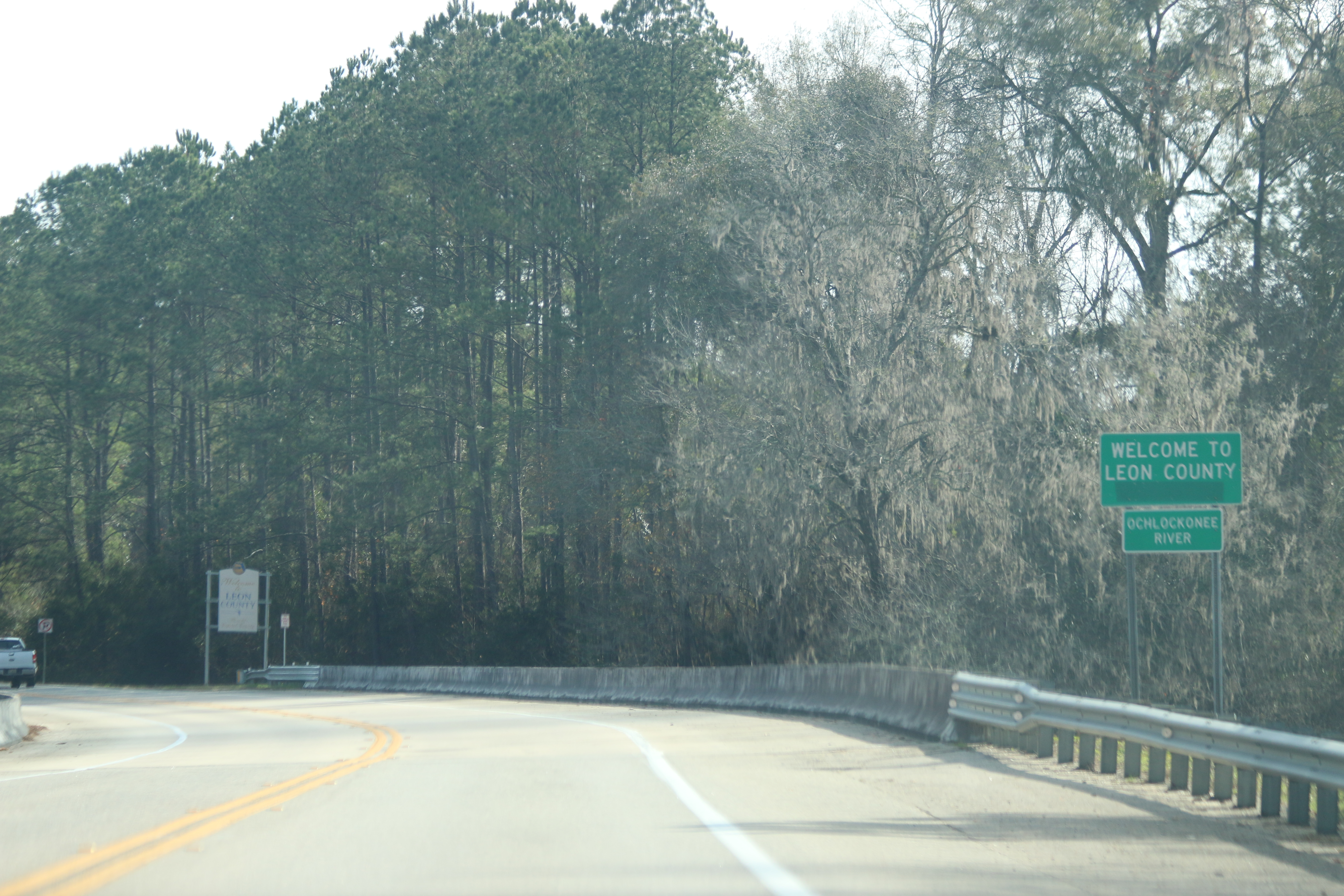
The sign for Leon County on State Road 20

- Interstate 10
- U.S. Highway 27
- U.S. Highway 90
- U.S. Highway 319
- State Road 20
- State Road 61
- State Road 155
- State Road 263
- State Road 267
- State Road 363

== Communities ==
=== City ===
- Tallahassee

=== Census-designated places ===
- Bradfordville
- Capitola
- Chaires
- Fort Braden
- Miccosukee
- Woodville

=== Other unincorporated communities ===
- Baum
- Belair
- Black Creek
- Bloxham
- Centerville
- Chaires Crossroads
- Felkel
- Gardner
- Iamonia
- Ivan
- Lafayette
- Lutterloh
- Meridian
- Ochlockonee
- Rose
- Wadesboro

=== Defunct entity ===
- Bond-South City, a former census-designated place enumerated by the United States Census Bureau in 1950 and 1960.

== Notable people ==
- Wally Amos – founder of the "Famous Amos" chocolate chip cookie brand; actor
- Tony Hale – actor, played Byron "Buster" Bluth on Arrested Development
- Isaac Jenkins (1846-1911), politician who served in the Florida House of Representatives in the 1880s
- Jerrie Mock – aviator and first woman to fly around the world solo
- T-Pain (born Faheem Najm) – hip hop and R&B singer
- Ernest I. Thomas – raiser of the original flag at Iwo Jima

== See also ==
- National Register of Historic Places listings in Leon County, Florida
