= Leon County Emergency Medical Services =

Emergency Medical Services in Tallahassee, Florida, United States

Coordinates: 30°20′13″N 81°39′41″W

Operational area
- Country: United States
- State: Florida
- County: Leon
- City: Tallahassee

Agency overview
- Established: December 31, 2003
- Annual calls: 50,000 (2023); 33,000 patient transports
- Employees: 150 FT, 35 PT (2023)
- Annual budget: $27,375,960 (2025)
- Fire chief: Chad Abrams
- EMS level: ALS

Facilities and equipment
- Divisions: 1
- Stations: 16
- Ambulances: 30+ (2023)

Website
- Official website

The Leon County Emergency Medical Services (LCEMS) provides emergency response and Advanced life support for all areas of Leon County including Tallahassee. The service was founded on December 31, 2003 and has been active for more than two decades. LCEMS is a government entity of Leon County and receives funding from a 0.75 mill assessment to property taxes.

== History ==
The Tallahassee Fire Department has never provided patient transport to the hospital, although their personnel are trained in ALS as EMTs and Paramedics. Funeral homes had been providing ambulance service to the citizens of Leon County for decades. Service was inconsistent and many patients died on the way to the hospital for lack of continued medical treatment. Tallahassee Memorial Hospital established Tallahassee's first EMS ambulance service in 1972 which continued through 2003.

The Legislature of Florida enacted the "Raymond H. Alexander, M.D., Emergency Medical Transportation Services Act" in 1973. The legislation required uniform and systematic emergency medical services to reduce disabilities and save lives.

On December 31, 2003 the Leon County Emergency Medical Services was established. They provide Advanced Life Support and clinically superior, cost-effective emergency medical services and transport to the citizens and visitors of Leon County.

== 911 Services ==
9-1-1 calls are prioritized and routed using "Computerized Medical Priority Dispatch Protocol" for correct response. Patients are transported to the nearest medical center. If the time and distance requires it, paramedics can request helicopter transport. If the situation requires specialized care, like extensive burns, the patient could be transported to the Shands burn center in Gainesville.

== Special operations ==
Medical support for large public events such as sporting or holiday celebrations is provided by the Special Operations Unit. They also have responsibility to provide medical care in disasters and mass casualty events. They also maintain and manage assets owned by the state or federal government for use when the owner requests them to be deployed.

== AED registration ==
A Community AED Program was created that LCSEMS maintains the list of publicly accessible AEDs and those registered by the Consolidated Dispatch Agency. If an AED is needed, 911 dispatchers will alert the caller to the location of the nearest device.

== Child Passenger Safety Seat Program ==
Parents and caregivers will learn the appropriate car seat for the age and weight of a child and when to transition a child to the next seat to keep the child safe as they grow. Leon County EMS has a limited supply of no-cost convertible child passenger car seats for County residents who meet criteria.

== Vial of Life Program ==
The Vial of Life (VOL) program is nationally recognized and assists EMS workers responding to and treating individuals during home medical emergencies. The VOL form contains an individual's medical history including medical conditions, allergies, current medications and emergency contacts. The form is placed in a baggie and hung on the refrigerator door.
