= Medical identification tag =

Bracelet or tag with medical information

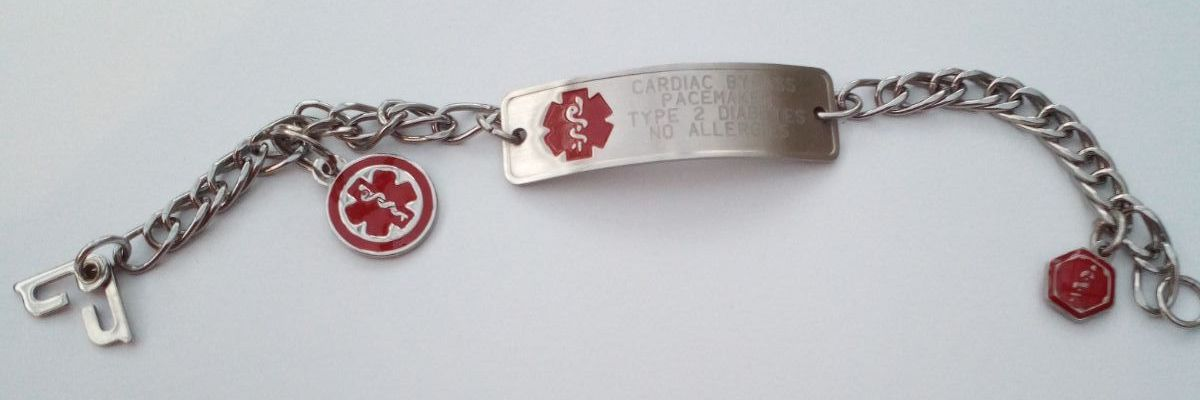
A medical alert bracelet

A medical identification tag is a small emblem or tag worn on a bracelet, neck chain, or on the clothing bearing a message that the wearer has an important medical condition that might require immediate attention. For emergency medical providers such as paramedics and emergency physicians, medical identification tags are particularly useful in situations where the wearer is unconscious, altered mental status, very young, or otherwise unable to provide critical medical information. The tag is often made out of stainless steel or sterling silver. A wallet card with the same information may be used instead of or along with a tag, and a stick-on medical ID tag may be added or used alone.

A type of medic identification alert is the USB medical alert tag, essentially a USB flash drive with capacity to store a great deal of emergency information, including contacts and medical conditions. This information is accessible by any computer with a USB port. However, the practical effectiveness of such a system is limited in many cases by medical computer systems that restrict the use of USB devices which may carry malware. It is also possible that a device carried by an unconscious person may not be their own, or not be up to date, with concomitant risks to health and legal liability of medical personnel.

Another new type of medic identification alert is QR code based medical alert stickers. The QR code on the sticker links to a web service that contains the individual's emergency information. The information is accessed by any first responder or emergency personnel by scanning the QR code by using a smartphone. In addition to QR codes there are now products that include an embedded RFID chip that allows a first-responder to simply tap their phone against the device. Since a web service is used to store the information there is normally no limitation of how much information that can be stored.

== History ==
In 1954, at the suggestion of Australian diabetes campaigner Ruby Board, the Diabetic Association of New South Wales introduced free printed cards for diabetics. This followed an incident in which a diabetic man was wrongfully arrested by police for public drunkenness, fell into a diabetic coma and died in police custody.

== Conditions for use ==
Typical conditions or prescriptions warranting the wearing of such a tag include but are not limited to:

- Adrenal insufficiency
- Advance Medical Directives (Do Not Resuscitate, POLST, Lasting Power of Attorney, Living Will)
- Anaphylaxis allergies (food, drug, insect)
- Alzheimer's disease
- Angioedema (hereditary)
- Anemia
- Asthma
- Asplenia
- Autism
- Cerebrovascular incident
- Chemotherapy
- Blood type (rare)
- Dementia
- Diabetic (Type 1 and 2)
- Epilepsy
- Hemodialysis
- Hemophilia
- Hypoglycemia
- Hypopituitarism
- Lamotrigine
- Drug-induced Long-QT syndrome
- Lymphedema risk
- Use of a monoamine oxidase inhibitor (MAOI) drug, which can interact fatally with epinephrine
- Memory disorders
- Pacemaker or other implantable medical devices
- Parkinson's disease
- Porphyria (acute)
- Seizure disorders
- Situs inversus
- Von Willebrand Disease

== Information provided ==
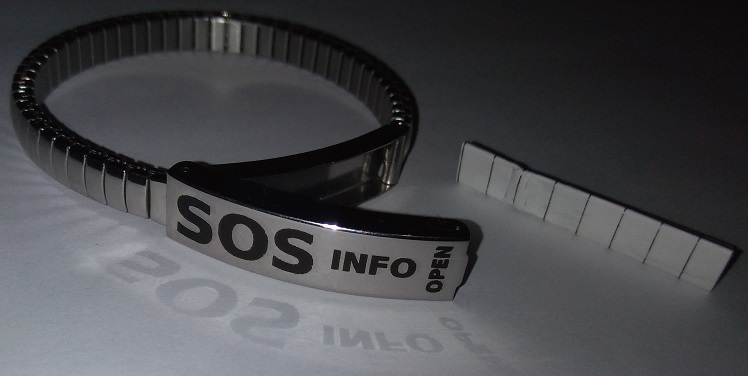
Some medical alert bracelets have an openable hatch, that contains a multifolded waterproof paper, in which information about persons medical needs are written.

In addition to mention of the relevant medical condition(s), the tag may have a telephone number that medical personnel can call for more information, for example that of physician, care-giver or next of kin. Where applicable and provided, the wearer's national health service user number can enable access to a more detailed case history. Basically, the medical information tag, engraved with the wearer's personal medical problem or history, speak for the wearer when the wearer can't. Incidentally and where the symptoms can mislead, such a tag may also be useful as evidence of such a condition to law enforcement personnel.

== Types ==
The emblem for medical emergency services in some countries, the Star of Life, features a rod of Asclepius.

There are various types of medical ID available. The most common form of medical ID is jewelry which provides a logo or inscription indicating a particular medical condition. These medical identification tags can be made out of stainless steel (usually classified as 316L and known as surgical stainless steel), sterling silver or gold. If found by emergency personnel the inscription provides an indication of the wearer's special medical needs. Tags are available with pre-engraved conditions or can be custom engraved with your specific medical histories and have the benefit that all information is self-contained and does not require any form of technology to view in case of an emergency.

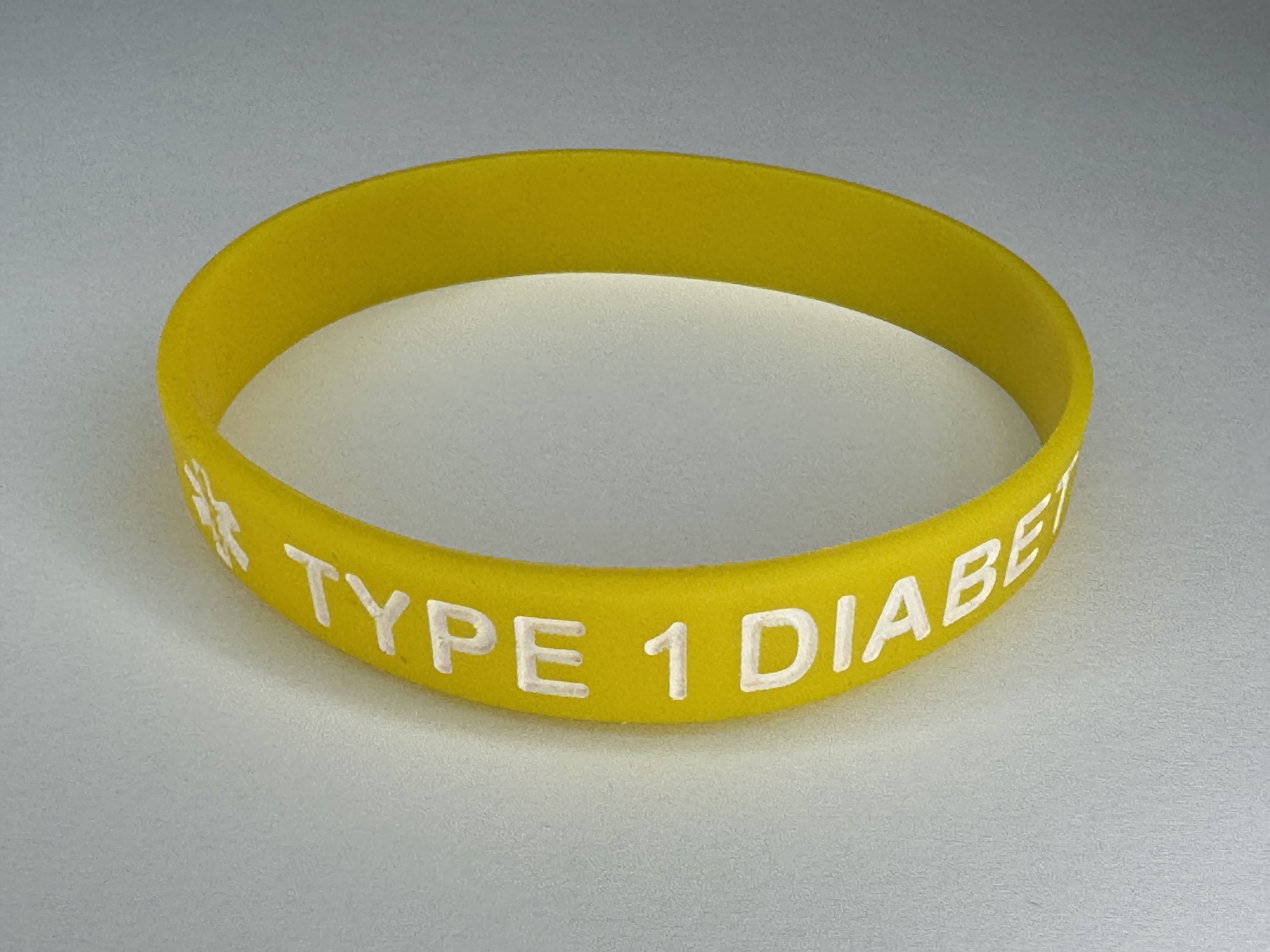
One of the most common kinds of medical ID jewelry is rubber bracelets.

Another type of medical ID jewelry indicates membership in a medical information organization such as the MedicAlert Foundation, American Medical ID, and StickyJ Medical ID. Such medical ID jewelry includes a member identification number and a toll-free number or URL for medical emergency personnel to obtain full information about the wearer's medical conditions, treatment, and history. These organizations maintain a database of medical information on their members and can provide it to medical personnel when requested.

The newest technology allows the user to carry stickers with an NFC tag. A similar technology allows the user to carry stickers with a QR code. By scanning the NFC tag or the QR code with a smartphone, you will reach the stored medical alert information. Modern mobile phones typically have a facility to gain access to the owner's medical emergency information (only) from the lock screen.

Silicone bracelets, preprinted with a general medical condition or allergy, are also popular. The lack of personalization may be a deterrent. Recently patients have begun to tattoo their medical condition on their wrist or arm, but if the individual's medical condition changes the tattoo would have to change as well. A temporary tattoo might work just as well as a permanent tattoo. Other items include stick on tags that stick onto a driver's license, wallet, or cell phone which are practical for the person who does not want to carry something extra advertising their medical condition. However, in general, emergency medical personnel are trained to look on the patient's wrists for a medical id, and may not look elsewhere.

Another type of medical jewelry is a pendant or wrist strap containing a wireless alert button, also known as a panic button, worn in the home as part of a wireless medical alert system. This type of medical jewelry sends a signal to a dialing console which contacts a monitoring service or directly dials first responders when an emergency occurs.

Examples of digital medical identification solutions include mobile-based emergency information tools, QR-code medical profiles, and international digital medical identification platforms such as World Emergency Card.

== See also ==
- Patient safety
- Medical alarm
- Dog tag — a military identification tag
- Medical tattoo
- SS blood group tattoo
- Vial of Life
