= Centerville, Florida =

Unincorporated community in Florida, U.S.

Coordinates: 30°33′26″N 84°10′35″W

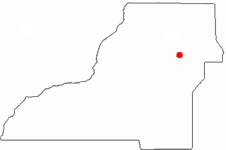
Location of Centerville in Leon County

Centerville is an unincorporated community in northeast Leon County, Florida, United States. It is located 1.5 miles (2.4 km) east of Bradfordville and 8 miles (13 km) north of Tallahassee at the intersection of County Road 0342 (Bradfordville Road) and County Road 151 (Centerville Road). The community's elevation is 177 feet (54 m).

== Location ==
Centerville, while rural, encompasses part of a large housing development of Killearn Acres and also a few homes on Roberts Road, Centerville Road, and Bradfordville Road. Centerville's boundaries are not distinct but it is fair to say that Centerville is bordered on the north by Felkel.

== Schools ==
Centerville is home to Roberts Elementary School.

== Political ==
Leon County Commissioners are elected in a nonpartisan election. For reference, however, their party registrations are listed.

Centerville Area Governmental Representation
Position	Name	Party
County Commission At-Large	Nick Maddox	Democrat
County Commission At-Large	Carolyn Cummings	Democrat
County Commission Dist. 4	Brian Welch	Democrat
U.S. House	Neal Dunn	Republican
Florida House	Allison Tant	Democrat
Florida Senate	Corey Simon	Republican
