= Ruby Board =

Australian community worker (1880–1963)

Ruby Board CMG
- Born: Ruby Willmet Board; 15 October 1880; Gunning, New South Wales, Australia
- Died: 25 December 1963 (aged 83); Redfern, New South Wales, Australia
- Occupation: Community worker
- Relatives: Peter Board (father); Euphemia Bridges Bowes (grandmother)

Ruby Willmet Board CMG (15 October 1880 – 25 December 1963) was an Australian community worker. She was known for her long association with the National Council of Women of Australia and with diabetes organisations.

== Early life ==
Board was born on 15 October 1880 in Gunning, New South Wales. She was the only child of Jessie Allen (née Bowes) and Peter Board; her father was a schoolteacher by profession who eventually became the director of the New South Wales Department of Public Instruction.

As a child, Board lived for periods at various locations around New South Wales as her father moved for his career. She was educated in Sydney, Berlin and Paris, before returning to Australia where she lived with her parents. She was supported by her father and had no need for paid employment. Her interest in public service was influenced by her maternal grandmother Euphemia Bridges Bowes, a suffragette and temperance activist.

== Public work ==
=== Women's issues ===
Board became involved with the National Council of Women of New South Wales in its early years and was a member for over 50 years. She served as honorary secretary from 1914 to 1918 and president from 1938 to 1948, also leading the Australian delegation to the International Council of Women in Washington, D.C., in 1925. Board was involved in the creation of the National Council of Women of Australia in 1931, becoming its inaugural treasurer. She later served as national president from 1942 to 1944, where she "focused on war work but with an emphasis on the issues of importance to women-treatment and pay of women in the services, postwar reconstruction (especially housing), and uniform marriage and divorce laws". In 1943 she presided over the women's reception for Eleanor Roosevelt at Sydney Town Hall.

As a senior figure within the more conservative NCW, Board came into conflict with Jessie Street and her left-wing Australian Women's Charter movement. She lobbied the federal government to disregard Street's activities and accept the NCW as the representative of the majority of Australian women's organisations. In 1948 she publicly criticised the appointment of Street as a member of the Australian delegation to the United Nations, stating that "most of the women of Australia do not feel that Mrs. Jessie Street represents their opinions".

Outside of the NCW, Board was active in the Country Women's Association and served as president of its Blue Mountains branch from 1930 to 1938. She was also a vice-president of the Rachel Forster Hospital from 1939 to 1958. During World War II, Board was the founding president of the Women's Voluntary National Register, which maintained a register of women willing to perform volunteer work during the war. She was also the defence director of the Women's Auxiliary National Service (WANS), which aimed to coordinate women's organisations, and served on the executive of the Australian Comforts Fund. In 1943 she was the founding chair of the Housekeepers' Emergency Service, established by the WANS to provide home care to women suffering health or other emergencies.

=== Health advocacy ===
Board was diagnosed with diabetes in the 1930s. She served as president of the Diabetic Association of New South Wales from 1951 to 1960. She organised lecture tours from international diabetes experts, including a visit from insulin co-discoverer Charles Best in 1952. In 1954, Board instituted a system of free identification cards for people with diabetes, following an incident in which a man in a diabetic coma was wrongly arrested for public drunkenness and died in police custody. She attended congresses of the International Diabetes Federation in 1955 to 1958 and was elected as inaugural president of the Diabetes Federation of Australia in 1957.

== Personal life ==
Board moved to Leura, New South Wales, with her parents in the early 1920s. She retired to Castle Hill in 1960. She died as the result of a fall on 25 December 1963 at the Rachel Forster Hospital in Redfern. The hospital's diabetic wing was named in her honour in 1966.
