= Peter Board High School =

- Wicks Road, North Ryde, New South Wales; Australia

Information
- Type: Government-funded co-educational comprehensive secondary day school
- Motto: Success Through Endeavour
- Established: 1 January 1962; 64 years ago (as North Ryde High School); 1 January 1986; 40 years ago (Peter Board High School)
- Status: Closed
- Closed: 31 December 1998
- Campus type: Suburban
- Colours: Red, navy blue and green

Peter Board High School (abbreviated as PBHS), known from 1962 to 1985 as North Ryde High School (abbreviated as NRHS), was a government-funded co-educational comprehensive secondary day school, that was located in North Ryde, a northern suburb of Sydney, New South Wales, Australia. The school opened in 1962 and closed in 1998.

== History ==
The school was originally established in January 1962 as "North Ryde High School", and it was located on a large site in North Ryde, bounded by Waterloo Road, Wicks Road and Epping Road. A portion of the buildings in Stages I and II were completed by January 1962. Since the school buildings were not ready in 1961, North Ryde High students attended Ryde High for a year. When North Ryde High opened, first year and second year students were able to attend. In 1965, when Malvina High School was established in the neighbouring suburb of Ryde, North Ryde High School was used to house 2nd Form classes until the construction of the school was complete.

In 1985 the decision was taken to rename the school after the first Director of Education in New South Wales, Peter Board, who had overseen a significant implementation of the Public Schools Act 1880. The name change took effect from January 1986. This year also saw the closure of the nearby Ryde High School (established 1960), with its students transferred to Peter Board High. The school's catchment area stretched from Eastwood to North Sydney and its student population was known for a wide diversity of cultural and ethnic backgrounds. In December 1987, the new School Library was officially opened by the Minister for Education and Member for Gladesville, Rodney Cavalier.

As a result of falling enrolments in the late 1990s, the department made the decision to close the school by December 1998, on the basis that enrolments would continue to fall, with the remaining students transferred to Malvina High School.

=== School site ===
Following the school's closure, in 2006 the NSW Department of Education and Training sold the site to Dexus Property Group for $51.75 million. Demolition of the school buildings subsequently commenced, which were completed by July 2008. From 2001 to 2008, the former school buildings were used as a filming location for "Summer Bay High School" in the Seven Network television drama, Home and Away.

The school oval was retained by the department for use as a Hockey field for the Ryde Hunters Hill District Hockey Club and ownership was later transferred in 2012 from the department to the State Sporting Venues Authority. In 2013, Dexus sold the former school site to Masters Home Improvement, with the intention of being the site of a new hardware store. However, with the collapse of the Masters retail business the site was put up for sale again. In response, the mayor of Ryde, Jerome Laxale, called upon the government to buy back the land for a new school, to help alleviate the high demand for schools in the Ryde area: "This is a great opportunity for the State Government to purchase the land of the proposed Masters Store and meet the increasing need for schools in this area that it did not address in its 'Plan for Growing Sydney'". In November 2017, it was announced that the NSW Government had signed an exclusivity agreement to repurchase the former school site for a new high school, with the Premier of NSW, Gladys Berejiklian (herself an alumna), noting: "For me, personally, it brings back a lot of memories having attended this high school very proudly and I remember at the time we ran protests to keep the school open ... it’s the right thing to do for the community because we know how quickly the area has grown".

== Notable alumni ==
- Gladys Berejiklian – 45th Premier of New South Wales (School Captain 1988)
