= Diabetes Australia =

Organization

- Formation: 1983
- Legal status: Company
- Purpose: Health
- Headquarters: Ground Floor, 19-23 Moore St, Turner, Australian Capital Territory
- Region served: Australia
- Services: Advocacy, research, educational materials, support groups, children’s and youth services, and informational resources
- President: Andrew Rutherford
- Group CEO: Justine Cain
- Main organ: Board
- Website: www.diabetesaustralia.com.au

Diabetes Australia was established in 1984 and is the national body for people affected by all types of diabetes and those at risk. Through leadership, advocacy, prevention, management, and research, Diabetes Australia is committed to reducing the impact of diabetes. Diabetes Australia works in partnership with diabetes health professionals, educators, researchers, and healthcare providers to minimise the impact of diabetes on the Australian community. Its head office is in Canberra.

Diabetes Australia has delivered the National Diabetes Services Scheme on behalf of the Australian Government since the Scheme was established in 1987.

== History ==
=== Diabetes Federation of Australia (DFA) ===
Australia’s first diabetes association, the Diabetic Association of Australia (later named Diabetes NSW & ACT), was formed in 1938 to promote diabetes awareness in New South Wales. Diabetes organisations for South Australia, Tasmania, and Victoria were later formed in the 1950s, intended as "self-help organisations aiming to improve the lives of people with diabetes through practical guidance and public education".

Following discussions between the existing state organisations, the Diabetes Federation of Australia (DFA) was established in Sydney in 1957 to serve as an official national body and representative to the International Diabetes Federation. The inaugural conference was held in October 1957 and was addressed by the federal health minister Donald Cameron. Ruby Board, a prominent diabetes and women's activist, was elected as the inaugural president. In 1987, the DFA changed its name to Diabetes Australia.

In 2021, members of some state and territory diabetes organisations, namely Diabetes NSW & ACT, Diabetes Tasmania, and Diabetes Queensland, agreed to unify with Diabetes Australia. In 2023, the Diabetes Australia constitution was updated, and the Group Strategic Plan 2023-2027 was released.

=== Diabetes Australia Committees ===
Diabetes Australia is a not-for-profit public company limited by guarantee and governed by a Board of Directors.

The Board is supported by four Board Committees:

- Finance & Investment Committee
- People & Culture Committee
- Risk, Quality & Compliance Committee
- Social Impact Committee

=== Parliamentary Friends of Diabetes ===
In 2000, the Hon Judi Moylan MP established the Parliamentary Friends of Diabetes Group with bipartisan support from executive members Dr Mal Washer MP and the Hon Dick Adams MP, with former members Mr Cameron Thompson and Mr Guy Barnett (former Senator for Tasmania).

== Statement of purpose ==
Diabetes Australia works in partnership with diabetes health professionals, educators, and researchers to minimise the impact of diabetes on the Australian community. Diabetes Australia is committed to challenging the trajectory of diabetes through greater awareness, prevention, early detection, effective management, and a cure.

Diabetes Australia raises awareness about the seriousness of diabetes, promotes prevention and early detection strategies, and advocates for better standards of care. Diabetes Australia is also a significant financial contributor to research into better treatments for diabetes and the search for a cure.

== Publications and research ==
Diabetes Australia produces two publications, one for medical specialists and another for the broader public.

The DFA began publishing a quarterly journal soon after its creation, initially named The Diabetic Journal, later renamed Conquest in 1959, and Circle in 2015.

Circle is a quarterly magazine covering health and wellbeing issues for people with diabetes and is available through membership of Diabetes Australia.

The Diabetes Management Journal (DMJ) is a magazine containing information and advice for general practitioners, endocrinologists, diabetes educators, optometrists and podiatrists, who receive it through their professional associations.

In 2023, Diabetes Australia released a report titled 2023 Snapshot: Diabetes in Australia, looking at the impact of diabetes in Australia. This was followed by The State of the Nation 2024 report, calling diabetes in Australia as having reached a “crisis point”, and A Healthier Future: Reducing the Impact of Diabetes Through Prevention in 2025.

Diabetes Australia today has a vision of a world free of diabetes, and it is dedicated to reducing the incidences of diabetes through prevention, awareness, and advocacy.

== Diabetes Victoria ==
Diabetes Victoria
- Founded: 1953; Victoria, Australia
- Type: Health Promotion Charity
- Location: Victoria
- Region served: Victoria
- Members: 48,000 as of 2016
- Key people: Glen Noonan, CEO
- Website: www.diabetesvic.org.au

Diabetes Victoria, formerly known as Diabetes Australia-Victoria is the leading charitable organisation and peak consumer body working to reduce the impact of diabetes based in Victoria, Australia. Founded in 1953, they support and campaign for Victorians who are affected by type 1 diabetes, Gestational diabetes, type 2 diabetes and prediabetes, as well as those at risk. They aim to reduce the effect of diabetes in Victoria, to assist with the procurement of diabetes medication, and to find a cure for diabetes. They are a member of Diabetes Australia.

Diabetes Victoria has had various campaigns to help reduce the cases of diabetes. As a member of the Obesity Policy Coalition, Diabetes Victoria lobbied against tax-payer funded surgeries for controlling weight, such as gastric bypass surgery, claiming that they do not address the root causes of diabetes and for stricter control over the toys given away as part of kids' meals, in an effort to reduce childhood obesity.

They also promote healthier lifestyles by encouraging Victorians to walk more, as a form of exercise.

In addition to working to reduce the number of cases of diabetes, Diabetes Victoria has advocated for adequate treatment for those afflicted by the disease and conducted research aimed at combating the practice of diabetics skipping insulin shots as a means of losing weight.

== See also ==
- Diabetes NSW & ACT
