= Euphemia Bridges Bowes =

Suffragette and social activist (1816–1900)

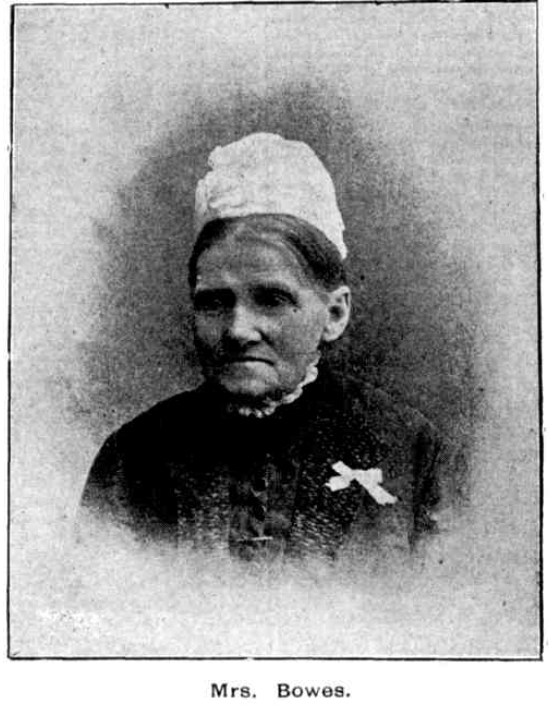
- Euphemia Bridges Bowes
- Born: Euphemia Bridges Allen; 1816; Edinburgh, Scotland
- Died: 12 November 1900 (aged 83–84); Marrickville, Australia
- Resting place: Old Wesleyan Section, Rookwood Cemetery
- Occupation: Civil activist
- Spouse: Rev. John Bowes
- Relatives: Ruby Board (granddaughter); Peter Board (son-in-law)

Euphemia Bridges Bowes (née Allen) (1816–1900) was a suffragette and social activist, who campaigned for the temperance movement and helped to raise the age of consent and fight against child prostitution.

== Early life ==
Euphemia Bridges Allen was born in Edinburgh in 1816 to Joseph and Eliza Allen. She was well-educated for a female in the early 19th century, and was able to read and write. Allen was selected to come to Australia as part of the Bounty Immigrants Scheme (1835–1941), under which new immigrants could be selected for employment by colonists who would pay for their passage. After arriving on 6 December 1838 upon the Fairlie, Euphemia worked as a house servant.

Allen married John Bowes, a baker and Wesleyan lay preacher, on 13 September 1842 in Parramatta. In 1848, the family moved to Wollongong where John was accepted into the Wesleyan Ministry. Euphemia gave birth to eleven children, with eight surviving into adulthood. After living in various rural townships as part of John's ministerial work, he and Euphemia returned to Stanmore in 1880.

== Social activism ==
Bowes was a driving member of the Sydney, and, New South Wales branches of the Woman's Christian Temperance Union, which was founded in 1882. This Union was the first to adopt the cause of female suffrage in Australia. Bowes was president from 1885-1892, and remained active until her death eight years later. She was regarded as a powerful and engaging speaker. She felt that giving women voting rights would be an excellent means of establishing control over the sale and consumption of liquor. Bowes used contacts from her time in rural districts to set up new regional unions. Thanks to her substantial contribution to the movement, Bowes was voted honorary life president in 1893 and she was succeeded by Sara Susan Nolan.

Bowes was also a productive campaigner for a variety of measures to decrease alcohol consumption in the colony. She had success in the development of licensing restrictions and the limitation of Sunday trading. Despite vigorous campaigning, she was unable to ban the use of barmaids. Some of her other contributions include practical programs such as a home for inebriate women, which was opened in 1892.

In 1886, Bowes was one of five women who founded a ladies' committee as an offshoot of the New South Wales Social Purity Society. As part of their agenda to promote morality in the colony, the committee secured several pieces of legislation to better protect women. Bowes was able to help with the elevation of the age of consent from 14 to 18. She was also instrumental in new measure against solicitation, brothels, and child prostitution.

== Later life ==
After the death of her husband in 1891, Euphemia ran the ladies' college that he established in Marrickville. She died on 12 November 1900 and is buried at Rookwood Cemetery; she was survived by three sons and four daughters. Her granddaughter Ruby Board (daughter of educationist Peter Board) was a prominent women's activist.
