= Peter Board =

Australian educationist and public servant (1858–1945)

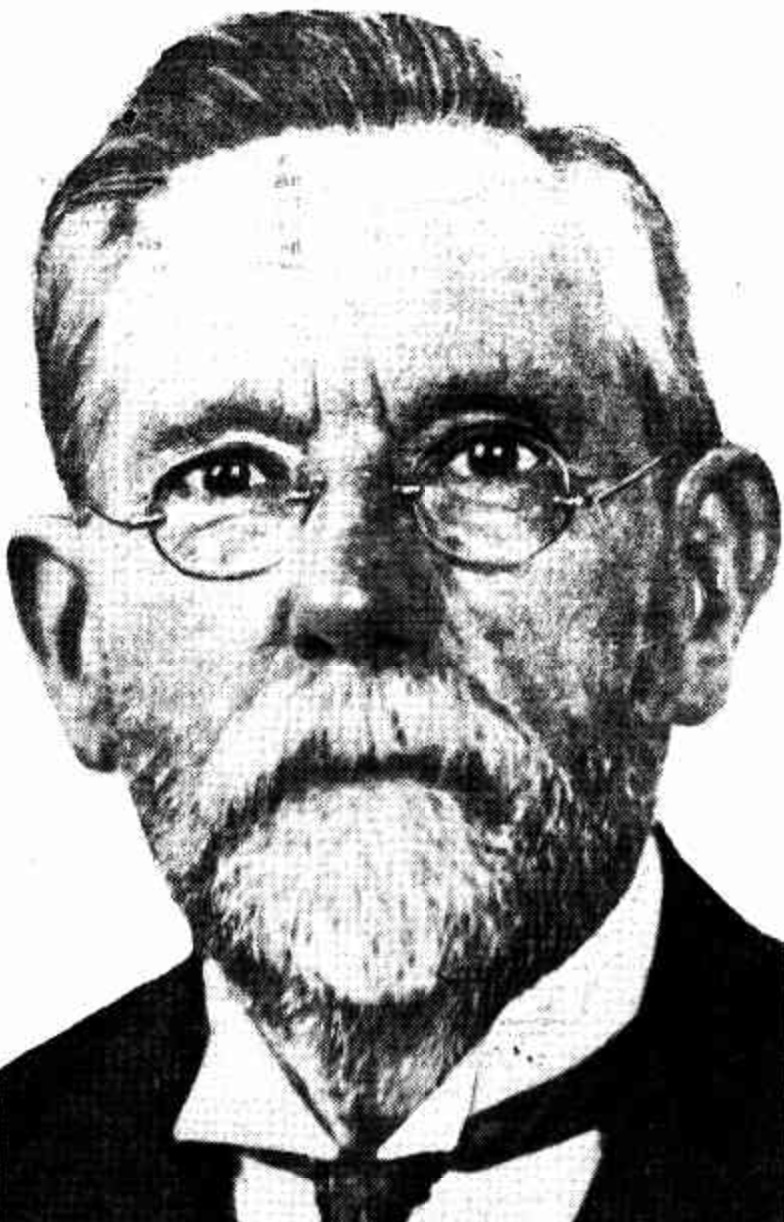
Peter Board.

Peter Board CMG (27 March 1858 – 12 February 1945) was an Australian educationist and public servant best known for his advocacy of education reform in New South Wales.

Board was born in Wingham, New South Wales, the son of a Scottish immigrant. He studied teaching in Sydney and later became a school inspector in country New South Wales. In 1905 he was appointed under-secretary and director of the Department of Public Instruction, a position he would hold until 1922. He oversaw the establishment of Sydney Teachers' College in 1906 and reforms such as a standardised curriculum overseen by a curriculum council and a high school leaving certificate.

Board was appointed Companion of the Order of St Michael and St George in 1916. He retired as Director of Education in 1922, to be replaced by Stephen Henry Smith.

== Personal life ==
In 1880, Board married Jessie Allen Bowes, daughter of suffragette and temperance activist Euphemia Bridges Bowes. Their only child was Ruby Board, who became a prominence women's activist.

Board and his wife retired to Leura, New South Wales, in the early 1920s. He was widowed in 1932 and died in Chatswood on 12 February 1945, aged 86.

== See also ==
- Peter Board High School
