= Bond-South City, Florida =

Bond-South City
- Former CDP
- Location within the state of Florida
- Coordinates: 30°24′59″N 84°16′50″W
- Country: United States
- State: Florida
- County: Leon

Population (1960)
  - Total: 1,148
- Time zone: UTC-5 (Eastern (EST))
  - Summer (DST): UTC-4 (EDT)
- ZIP codes: 32301, 32310

Bond-South City was a census-designated place in Leon County, Florida during the 1950 and 1960 censuses, which consists of the communities of Bond and South City.

== Population ==
The population in 1950 was 4,611. However, subsequent annexations by Tallahassee reduced the census area's population to 1,148 by 1960. Further expansion by Tallahassee in the 1960s absorbed the remainder of the CDP area.

== Geography ==
Historical population
| Census | Pop. | Note | %± |
|---|---|---|---|
| 1950 | 4,611 | | — |
| 1960 | 1,148 | | −75.1% |

The census area of Bond-South City was located south of Tallahassee and north of Woodville. The census area was home to Florida A & M University, which separated the communities. Adams and Monroe Streets are the main north-south corridors of the area.
