= Eagle Scout Service Project =

Leadership and community service project in US Scouting

The Eagle Scout Service Project, or simply Eagle Project, is the opportunity for a Scout (Scouts BSA), or qualified Venturer or Sea Scout in Scouting America to demonstrate leadership of others while performing a project for the benefit of their community. This is the culmination of the Scout's leadership training, and it requires a significant effort on his or her part. The project must benefit an organization other than Scouting America, and it cannot be performed for an individual or a business or be commercial in nature. Completing an Eagle Project is a requirement in order for Scouts to attain the Eagle Scout rank.

== Requirement ==
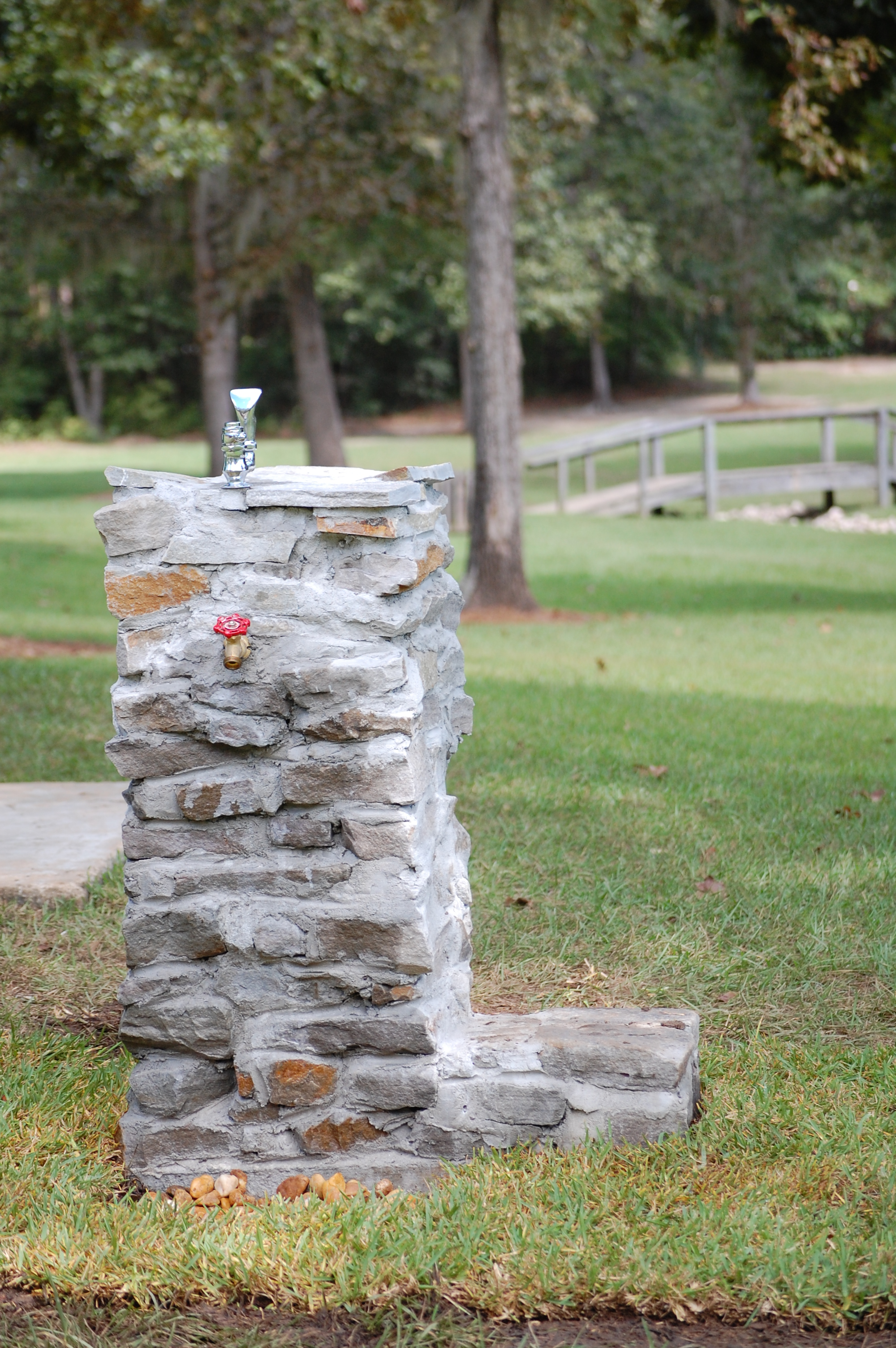
A public drinking fountain, an example of an Eagle Scout service project

While a Life Scout, plan, develop, and give leadership to others in a service project helpful to any religious institution, any school, or your community. (The project must benefit an organization other than the Boy Scouts of America.) A project proposal must be approved by the organization benefiting from the effort, your Scoutmaster and unit committee, and the council or district before you start. You must use the Eagle Scout Service Project Workbook, in meeting this requirement.

— Scouts BSA Handbook

A written plan must be submitted using the Eagle Scout Leadership Service Project Workbook and be pre-approved by the benefiting organization, the Scout Leader, the unit committee, and a district representative, before work on the project can begin. After the project is complete, the Scout updates the workbook where they discuss the methods in which they gave leadership, ways the plan may have had to change, and the benefits of the project to the community.

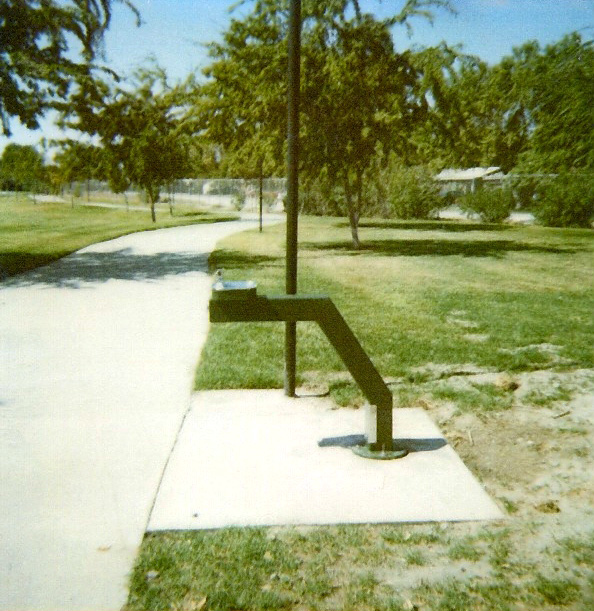
An Eagle Scout Project completed at a YMCA in Corcoran, California

Examples of Eagle Projects include constructing park benches, running a blood drive, constructing a playground, building bat houses for a local park, refurbishing a room at a church or school, resetting stones at a cemetery, planting grass for erosion control, organizing a dinner, interviewing American veterans for the Library of Congress, distributing emergency medical information kits, and collecting necessities for the homeless.

== History ==
The merit badges required for Eagles have been a requirement since the inception of the award. A Scout's "record of satisfactory service" with his troop was first added to the Eagle requirements in 1927. This changed in 1952 to "do your best to help in your home, school, church or synagogue, and community." This vague statement was refined to "plan, develop, and carry out a service project" in 1965.

In 1972 a leadership component "give leadership to others" was added.

== Impact ==
The idea for a project may be an original one or the candidate may model their project on another Scout's. In either case, the Scout must plan, develop, and lead others in doing the project. There is no numerical minimum amount of time or requirement for time in which the project needs to be completed, but it must be enough to "demonstrate leadership." The exact implementation of requirements varies among districts and councils.

The thoroughness of the required service project is a major step in the completion of the Eagle rank. The Eagle Project highlights the total impact of the Scouting program to the community as a whole.

In 2012, the National Eagle Scout Association researched the number of volunteer hours spent on Eagle Projects and it came a total of more than 100 million hours of service. Each year, new Eagle Scouts are adding more than three million more hours.

== See also ==
- Advancement and recognition in Scouting America
