= Bradley's Country Store Complex =

- Bradley's Country Store
- U.S. National Register of Historic Places
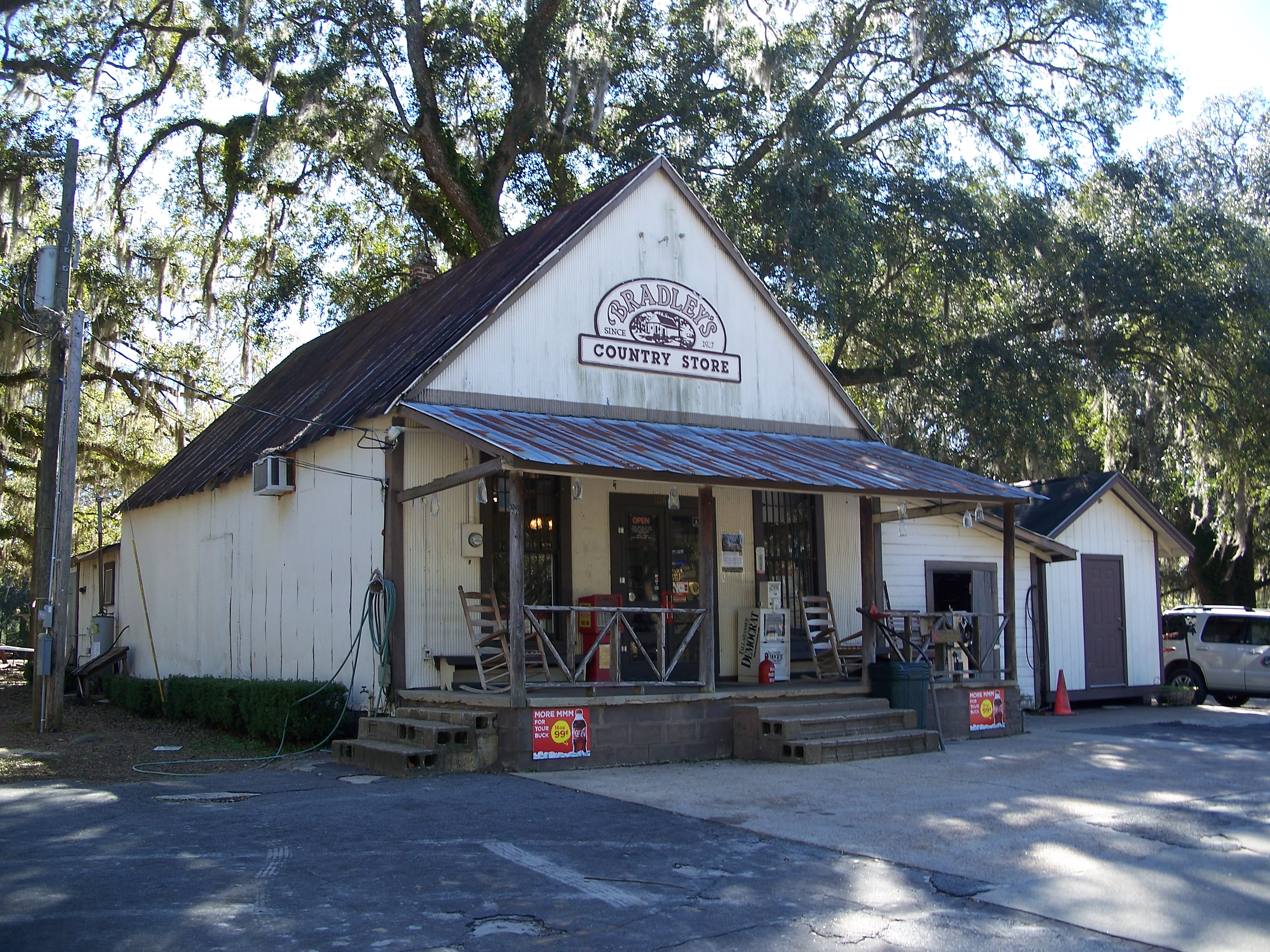
- Location: Felkel, Florida
- Coordinates: 30°35′49″N 84°7′4″W
- NRHP reference No.: 84000902
- Added to NRHP: 12 April 1984

Bradley's Country Store Complex is located 12 miles (19 km) north of Tallahassee, Florida, United States on Centerville Road (County Road 151) in the community of Felkel, Florida. Bradley's Country Store complex has 17 buildings, most frame vernacular, on 31 acres (130,000 m^{2}) of land.

== History ==
In 1910, Mrs. Bradley began selling sausage from her kitchen to the local community. The store was constructed in 1927 and served the people of the surrounding area of Felkel and Miccosukee. In 1915 a cane press and syrup furnace was constructed followed a few years later by a syrup house to store the bottled cane syrup. In 1922 a commissary was built, and later on a grist mill, smokehouse, and sausage processing plant were constructed. Bradley's Country Milled Grits were first produced in the 1920s. Today, the small store remains popular. Customers experience food shopping much as it was in the early part of the 20th century. In April 1984, Bradley's Country Store was placed on the National Register of Historic Places.

== Services ==
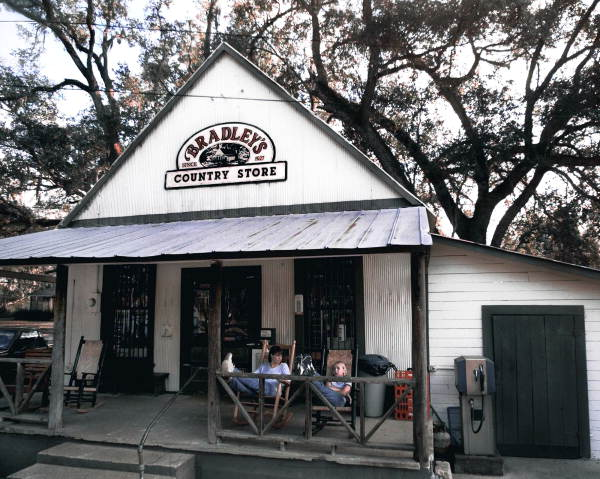

Bradley's carries a variety of dry and canned foods, items for everyday needs, but also produces their own foods such as Bradley's Country Sausage, cracklings, liver pudding, hogshead cheese, and coarse ground country milled grits, corn meal, and cane syrup.

== Events ==
- Tallahassee Trade Fair held on President's Day weekend is an 18th-century encampment reenactment gathered around a pond with period demonstrations and costumes.
- Bradley's Country Fun Day is held annually on the Saturday before Thanksgiving.
