= Ryde Secondary College =

Secondary school in New South Wales, Australia

Location
- Ryde, Sydney, New South Wales; Australia; 33°48′48″S 151°07′08″E

Information
- Type: Government-funded co-educational dual modality partially academically selective and comprehensive secondary day school
- Motto: Respect, Responsibility and Resilience
- Established: 1965; 61 years ago (as Malvina High School); 2001; 25 years ago (as Ryde Secondary College)
- School district: Ryde
- Educational authority: New South Wales Department of Education
- Principal: Cassy Norris
- Years: 7–12
- Enrolment: 1600 (2025)
- Campus: Suburban
- Colours: Maroon, navy, light blue and white
- Affiliation: Combined High Schools
- Website: https://rydesc-h.schools.nsw.gov.au/

Ryde Secondary College is a government-funded co-educational dual modality partially academically selective and comprehensive secondary day school, located in Ryde, a suburb of Sydney, New South Wales, Australia.

Established in 1965 as Malvina High School, Ryde Secondary College caters for approximately 1600 students from Year 7 to Year 12. It is one of the few schools in New South Wales which takes enrolments for selective students, mainstream students as well as those who need special education (support unit students).

== History ==
The school opened in 1965, designed in an innovative "doughnut" style by NSW Government Architect's Branch architect, Michael Dysart. However, this and other "doughnut"-shaped building designs have been criticised due to the poor rain water drainage and inefficiencies in the heating and cooling of rooms. Ryde Secondary College was originally named Malvina High School due to the school's location on Malvina Street, Ryde (another high school in the same suburb had used the name Ryde High School until its merger with North Ryde High School in 1986). A Support Unit was introduced in 1999, after the closure of Peter Board High School at North Ryde, where the Unit had previously been. In 2001 it was announced that Malvina High School would receive a $6 million upgrade, under the New South Wales Government's controversial "Building The Future" plan to improve the infrastructure and environment of the school. From 2002 the school was renamed Ryde Secondary College, to properly identify the school to its suburb locality. The school also took selective stream students from 2002 and continues to do so.

Since 2002, Ryde Secondary College has taken on new Information Technology infrastructure which was linked to Macquarie University, a Drama Studio, Music Studio and Sports facility upgrades. Ryde Secondary College also has an outstanding performance record in grade sports against other competing schools in the area, and has maintained the title of zone champion for swimming and athletics. Ryde Secondary College has also developed a centre of excellence in Volleyball and has entered multiple teams in recent national volleyball competitions. The college also offers a wide range of social sports, and a Dance program.

Ryde Secondary School has several musical ensembles; a concert band, jazz band, choir and string ensemble, guitar and drum ensembles, and rock bands.

It is only one of four surviving co-ed secondary schools in the Ryde/Hunters Hill district, along with Marsden High School at West Ryde and Hunters Hill High School. Other local government schools have progressively closed due to declining student numbers, alongside a gradual increase in popularity of single-sex and independent secondary schools. Since 2002, Ryde Secondary College has seen a healthy increase to student numbers, and in 2025 it had approximately 1500+ students.

=== Since re-establishment ===
- 2001 – name changed from Malvina High School to Ryde Secondary College under the NSW Government's "Building the Future Plan". This also saw a change in logo, and a change in uniform. Became a partially selective high school
- 2002 – selective students able to enrol at Ryde Secondary College – Year 7 enrolment reached 150
- 2006 – the last Malvina year graduated from Ryde Secondary College
- 2007 – the first stream of the new student body graduated
- 2010 – the principal since reformation, John Hughes, retires

== Notable alumni ==
- Pierre Boda – Short track speed skater whom competed in the 2014 Sochi Winter Olympics
- Hayden Turner – Zookeeper and television presenter

== See also ==
- List of government schools in New South Wales
- List of selective high schools in New South Wales
