= Richard Feiock =

Richard C. Feiock (born January 12, 1959) was an American political scientist. He was formerly the Augustus B. Turnbull Professor & The Jerry Collins Eminent Scholar Chair at The Florida State University Askew School of Public Administration and Policy. He resigned in 2020 amid a sexual misconduct investigation. The investigation found that he had been reported for sexual misconduct multiple times since 1991. Dozens of journals in the field responded by condemning his behavior and advocating for better protection of graduate students.

He is a former editor for the Public Administration Review. Feiock is known for his work on the subjects of local government, intergovernmental management, environmental policy, and administrative affairs. Feiock's major works includes the creation of the Institutional Collective Action Framework, and major works dealing with institutional constraints within local government, metropolitan governance, and self-organizing federalism.
