= Tallahassee Fire Department =

Fire department in the United States

Operational area
- Country: United States
- State: Florida
- City: Tallahassee

Agency overview
- Established: 1902
- Fire chief: Gene Sanders
- EMS level: ALS
- IAFF: 2339

Facilities and equipment
- Battalions: 3
- Stations: 16
- Engines: 12
- Trucks: 5
- Tenders: 5
- HAZMAT: 2
- USAR: 1
- Airport crash: 3
- Wildland: 3

Website
- Official website
- IAFF website

The Tallahassee Fire Department provides fire protection and Advanced life support first-response emergency medical services to the city of Tallahassee, Florida and Leon County. The department dates back to 1902, when the first fire department was established by the city. However, some fire protection service existed before that; in 1872 the Colored Hook and Ladder Company responded to the fire which destroyed Lincoln Academy, after the white company, citing "insufficient hoses", refused to respond.

== Stations ==
TFD has 16 fire stations to serve and protect 702 square miles in Tallahassee/Leon County with a population of almost 300,000. The department has 313 certified firefighters, primarily in the Suppression Division, who respond to 36,000+ incidents every year. Certified individuals serve as command staff and there are 17 general employees who perform administrative services or support.

Each year, TFD typically responds to 400 structure fires, (residential & commercial), 200 vehicle fires, 900 brush/rubbish fires and 1100 vehicle rescues.

In September 2025, the Tallahassee City Commission terminated the contract to provide fire services to Leon County after a series of disagreements. The contract is scheduled to run through 2028, giving the county time to decide on an alternative fire services provider; the Interlocal Agreement requires the city to sell fire stations 10-14 back to the county including vehicles and equipment at a depreciated value.

As of 2026, the planned station on Lake Bradford Road has been significantly delayed, with discussion still ongoing.

== Training ==
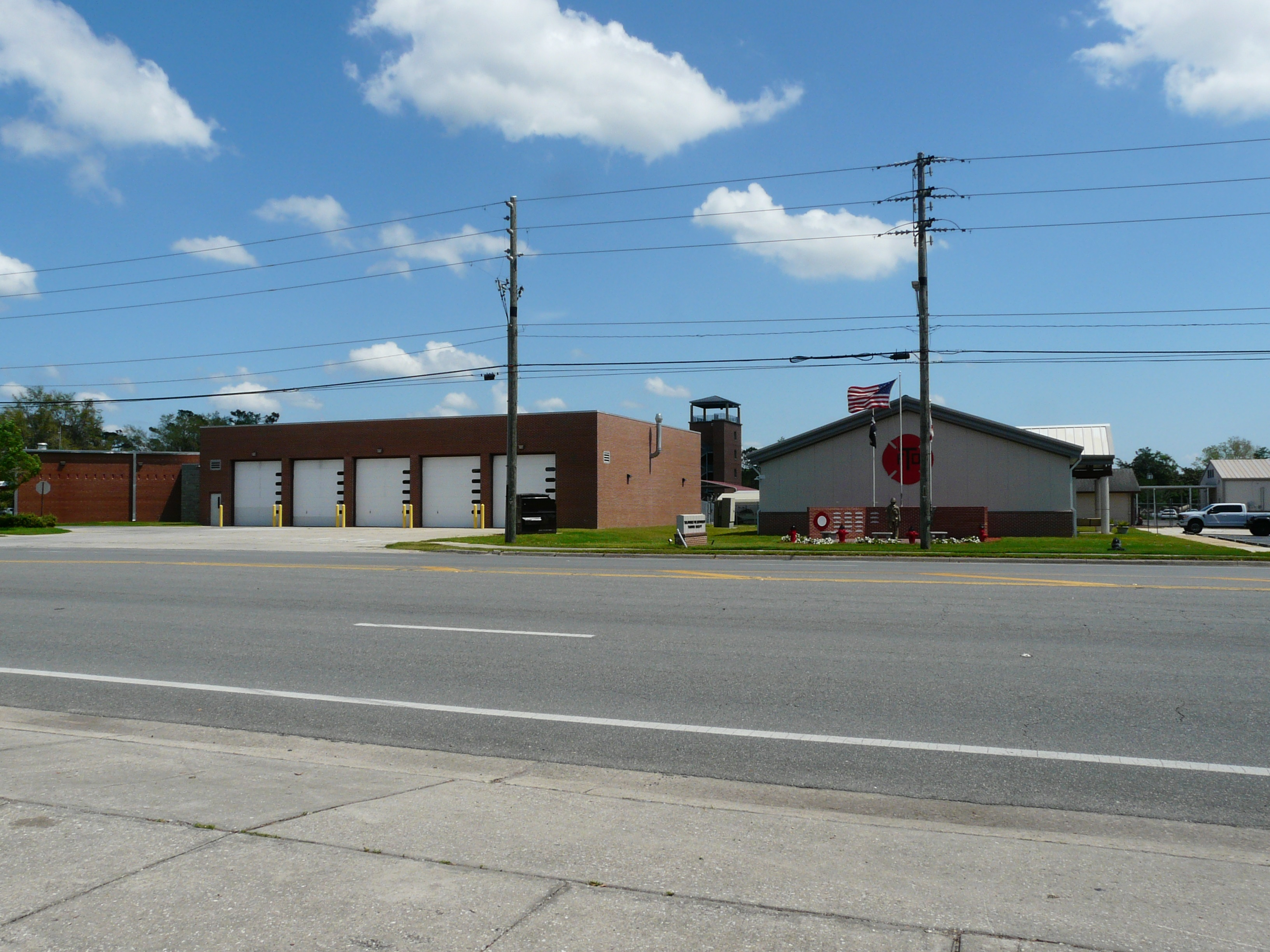
Fire Station No. 4 and Training Facility

The Tallahassee Fire Department operates a training facility on Municipal Way in the western part of the city, located on the long-closed Dale Mabry Army Airfield. The Florida Department of Environmental Protection performed a site reconnaissance and site assessment in June 2019. Lab results indicated high levels of PFOA and PFOS. In March 2020 the Florida Department of Health sampled nine potable wells around the training area and one was found to exceed Health Advisory Levels.

== Stations and apparatus ==
The TFD has 16 stations spread out across the city and split into 3 battalions.

Fire Station Number	Image	Address	Engine Company	Truck Company	Rescue Unit (rural response mini-pumper/light rescue)	Battalion chief Unit	Special Unit
1		327 North Adams St	Engine 1 Engine 101	Truck 1		Battalion Chief 1	Tanker 1, Fire Med 1 (citywide fire medic supervisor) & Air 5 (cascade unit)
2		2805 Sharer Rd	Engine 2	Truck 2		Battalion Chief 2	HazMat 2
3		3005 South Monroe Street	Engine 3	Truck 3		Battalion Chief 3	HazMat 3 & Mass Casualty Unit (with trailer)
4		2899 West Pensacola St	Engine 4	Truck 4			Brush 4, Air 4 (cascade unit) & USAR (with trailer)
5		Tallahassee International Airport					Crash 51, Crash 52 & Crash 53
6		2901 Apalachee Pkwy	Engine 6				Brush 6, Boat 6
7		2805 Shamrock St	Engine 7				
8		2423 Hartfield Rd	Engine 8				
9		3205 Thomasville Rd	Engine 9 (Haz-Tac ALS Engine)				
10		5323 Tower Rd	Engine 10				
11		8752 Centerville Rd			Rescue 11		Tanker 11
12		4701 Chaires Cross Rd			Rescue 12		Tanker 12
13		1555 Oak Ridge Rd			Rescue 13		Tanker 13
14		16614 Blountstown Hwy			Rescue 14		Tanker 14
15		1445 Bannerman Rd	Engine 15				Brush 15, Boat 15
16		913 Easterwood Drive	Engine 16	Truck 16			

== Photo gallery ==
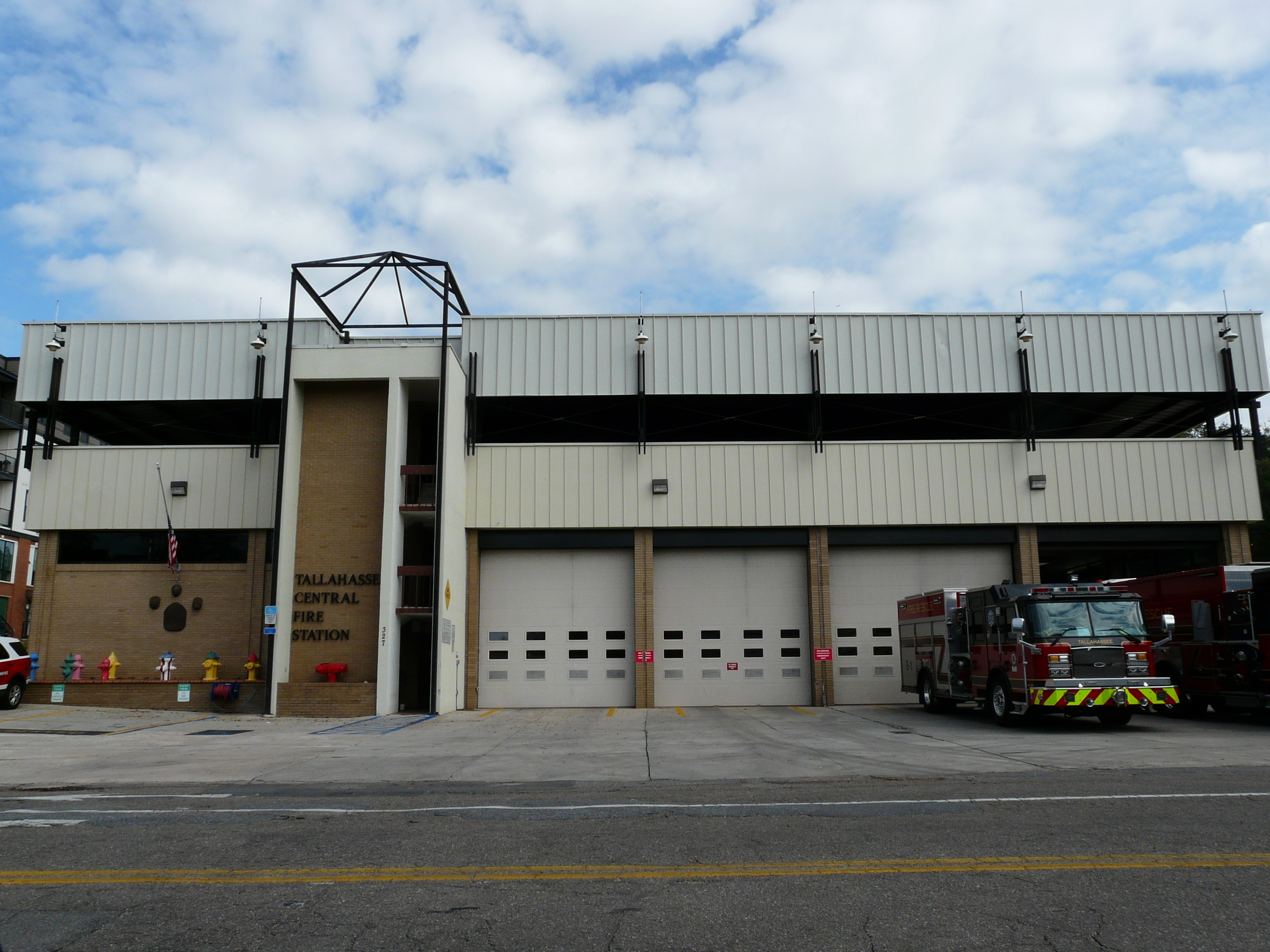
Central Fire Station downtown

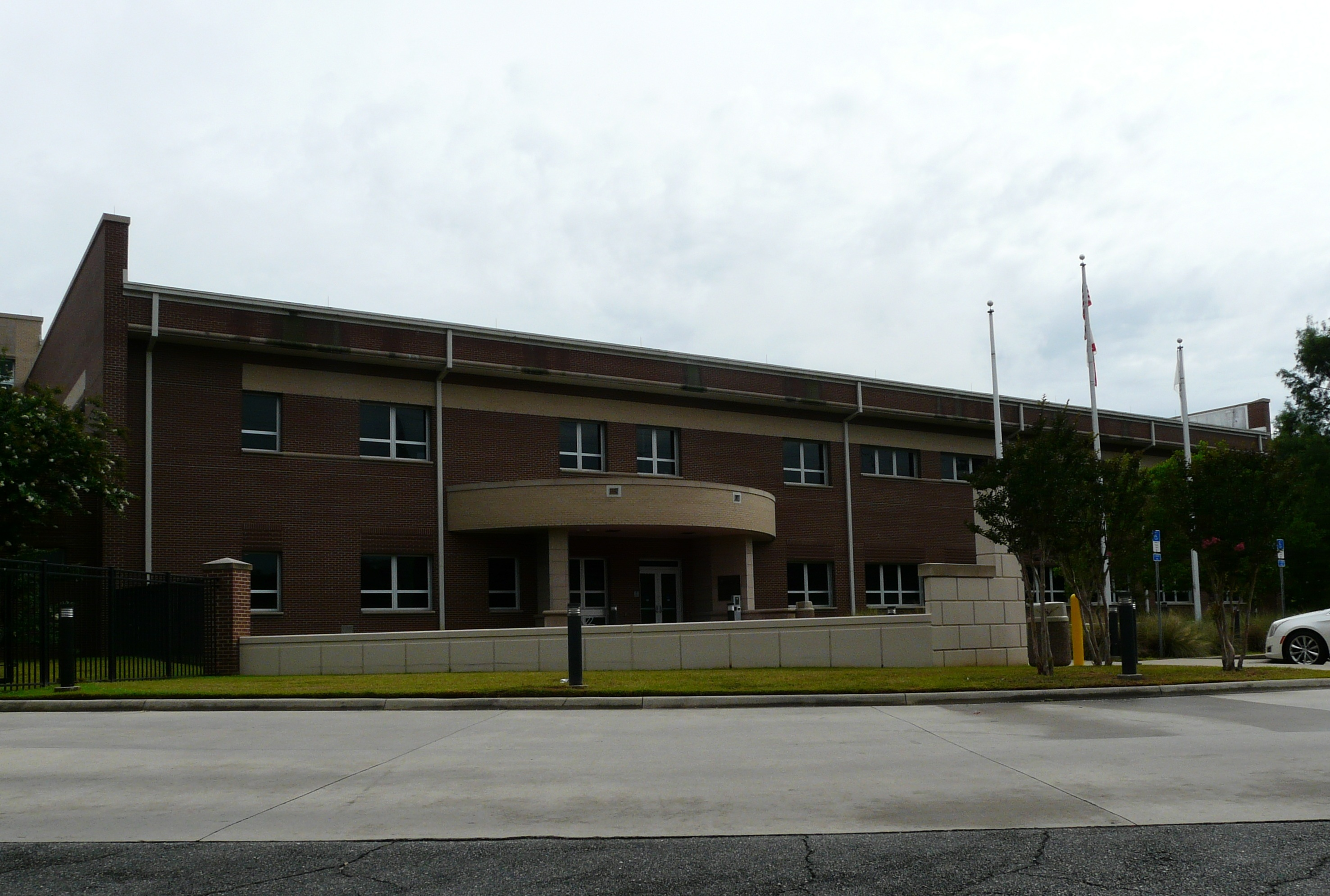
Headquarters in Tallahassee Public Safety Complex

Women in the Tallahassee Fire Department

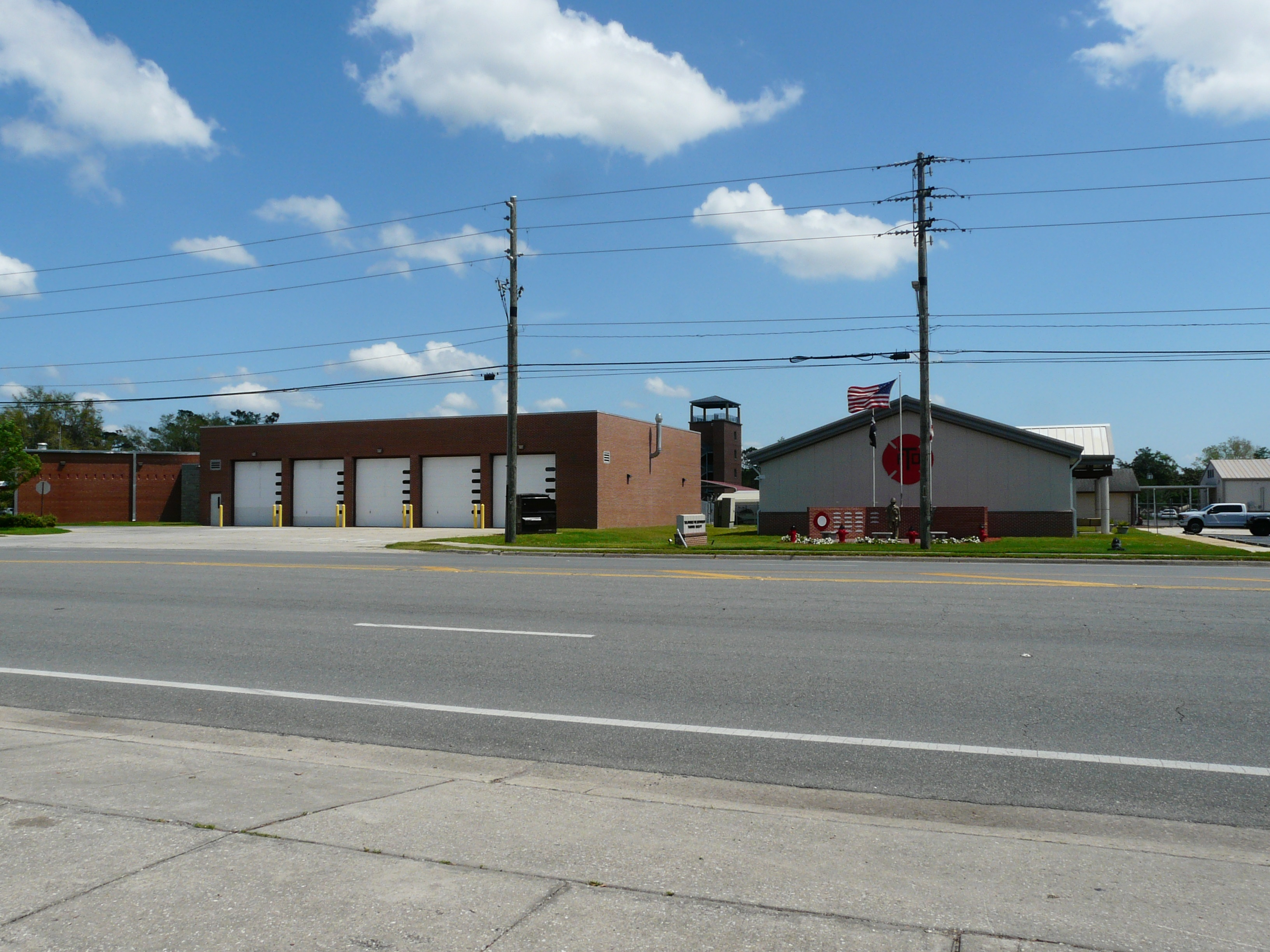
Fire Station No. 4 and Training Facility

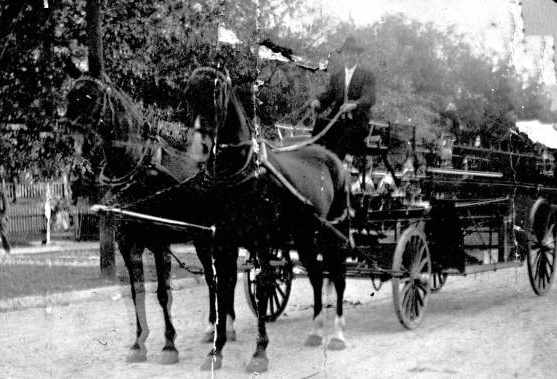
Chief Pinkney Coe on fire hose wagon.

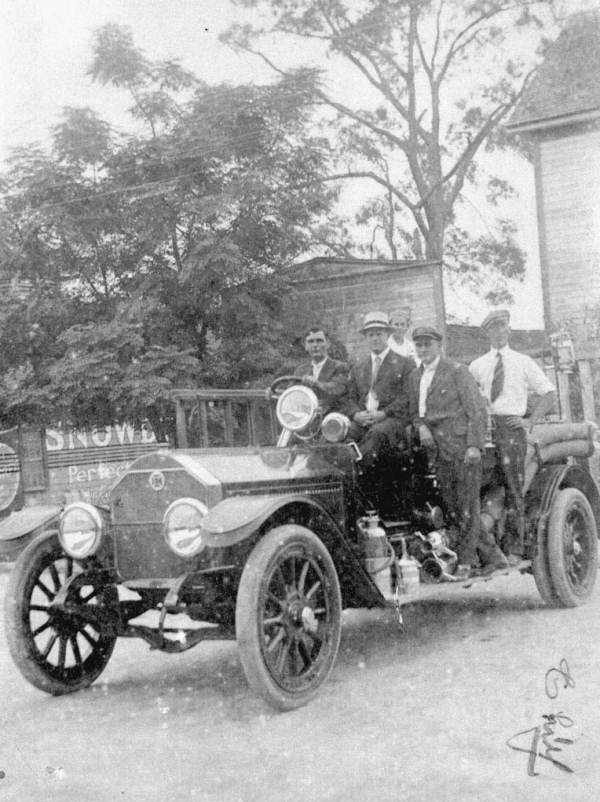
Fire truck #1 outside Adams Street station (1916).
