= Vial of Life =

In-home emergency medical information program

Sample Vial of Life sticker

The Vial of Life (French: Fiole de vie), also known as Vial of L.I.F.E. (Lifesaving Information for Emergencies), is a program that allows individuals to have their complete medical information readily available in their homes for emergency personnel to reference during an emergency. The program provides the patient's medical information when the patient is unable to speak or remember it. Vial of Life programs are commonly used by senior citizens and promoted by senior center organizations, fire departments, and other community organizations.

== Background ==
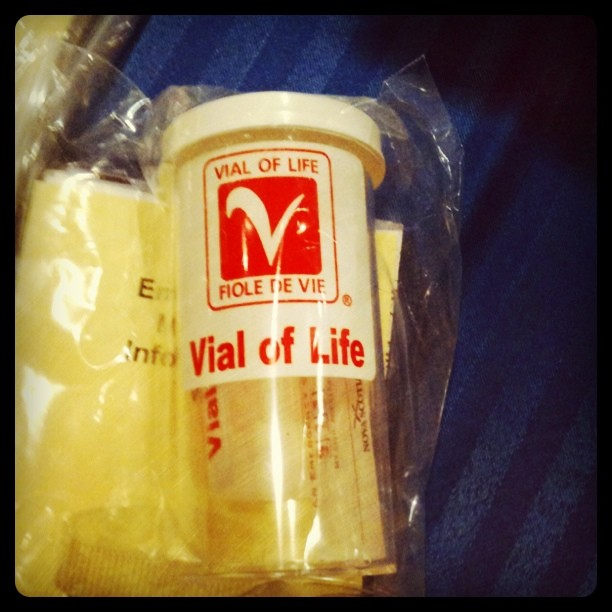
Vial of Life Bottle

It is unknown where and when the first Vial of Life program started. The Vial of Life was named after the prescription bottles that were originally used to store a medical information form inside the patient's refrigerator. The prescription bottle would then be rubber-banded to the bottom of the top-most shelf of the refrigerator door.

When a patient first starts with their Vial of Life kit, they must complete a medical information form about their medical history. With complete medical information, paramedics can take appropriate measures to treat patients in an emergency. Patients fill out information such as blood type, medical conditions, current medications, doctor's name and number, allergies, insurance information, emergency contacts, the most recent cardiogram, and a picture.

Patients should also include advance health care directives. These medical orders (DNR, MOST, POLST) must be signed by a physician and are the most frequently used medical directives. The DNR (Do Not Resuscitate) order expresses the patient's preference to decline cardiopulmonary resuscitation. The names of the other physician orders (MOST or POLST forms) vary by state. In some states, it is called a MOST form (Medical Order for Scope of Treatment), and in others, it is called a POLST (Physician Order for Life-Sustaining Treatment) form. These medical treatment preference documents are critical, especially for the elderly, for whom resuscitation by emergency responders (EMTs) may cause painful and/or life-threatening injuries. Without these documents to guide the emergency responder, patients must understand that EMTs are trained to automatically administer a full range of emergency life-saving measures. Patients who wish to decline automatic EMT measures should be aware that most jurisdictions require that the DNR, MOST, and POLST documents included in the Vial of Life container be original versions, including the physician's signature.

Another important directive is a legal document called the Health Care Power of Attorney (HCPOA), which designates a person to make medical decisions if the patient can no longer express their own preferences. This legal document generally requires notarized signatures of the patient and one or more witnesses. Unlike physician orders (DNR, MOST, POLST), the HCPOA typically includes a list of various patient preferences for receiving or declining medical treatment. In some jurisdictions, the HCPOA may not carry the same weight with emergency responders, as they may not know what form is required for the HCPOA to be legally binding, and it may be a multi-page document using legal language not understood by EMTs.

== History ==
In 1981, the Sacramento chapter of the American Red Cross transferred their program and a small amount of Vial of Life supplies to Jeff Miller, founder and CEO of Vital-Link, Inc. In the following years, Miller and his distributors continued the program by providing free Vial of Life kits to their medical alert system subscribers as part of the service.

In 1998, Miller turned the program into a California public charity (which later gained 501(c)(3) status) called the Vial of Life Project. This charity supplies materials across the United States, including to Red Cross chapters, governmental agencies, hospitals, and pharmacies, among others, providing free Vial of Life kits or discounted decals for those needing mass quantities. A number of organizations, such as AARP, support the program.

The Vial of Life has inspired similar programs, such as "File of Life" and "Vial a Life." Jeff Miller and the Vial of Life Project charity left the Vial of Life name in the public domain so it could be replicated and used by other agencies and organizations. Due to his historical claim to the Vial of Life name, no organization can copyright it.

=== Other Vial of Life Programs ===
While there are different types of Vial of Life programs, they all function similarly. When paramedics arrive at a house, a decal on the front door or window alerts them that the resident uses the Vial of Life for their medical information. The decal also directs the paramedics to where the information is kept, whether in a plastic bag on the outside of the fridge or a pill bottle inside the refrigerator.

Originally, Vial of Life kits came with a plastic vial (an empty pill bottle or another container). The vial would be labeled with a Vial of Life decal, and the completed medical information form would be placed inside. These plastic vials tended to get lost in the refrigerator, pushed towards the back over time, making them hard to find for emergency crews. Nowadays, most programs ask patients to place their completed medical form inside of a plastic Ziploc bag, which is then placed on the front of the refrigerator with a Vial of Life decal on it.

== See also ==
- Medical identification tag
