= Barry University School of Adult and Continuing Education – Tallahassee Campus =

Coordinates: 30.4442847°N 84.3397438°W

Barry University
- Motto: Where You Belong
- Type: Private, Roman Catholic
- Established: 1940
- Endowment: $28,959,692
- President: Sister Linda Bevilacqua
- Location: Tallahassee, Florida, USA
- Campus: Suburban
- Website: www.barry.edu

Barry University School of Adult and Continuing Education – Tallahassee Campus is branch campus of Barry University and is located on the campus of Tallahassee Community College in Tallahassee, Florida.

== Academics ==
The Barry University campus in Tallahassee offers Bachelor of Science degrees in:

- Legal Studies designed to provide a broad background in fundamental legal studies to students who desire to become paralegals or legal assistants working under the supervision of a lawyer.
- Professional Administration designed to prepare the student with the administrative and leadership skills needed in all organizations - private, public, or non-profit - in order to successfully fulfill their missions and achieve their goals.
- Public Administration for professional employment in general public administration and is highly desirable for most of the special applications such as police, fire and planning.
- Information Technology for specializing in information systems administration, telecommunications, Network and systems engineering, software engineering
- A Certificate Program in Health Services for entry and middle management positions in such areas as hospitals, medical or dental clinics, group medical practices, managed care organizations, long-term care facilities, insurance companies, home health agencies, and government agencies. The curriculum emphasizes management skills for use in any health care setting.
