= Woodland Hall Academy =

Coordinates: 30.4890892°N 84.2221202°W

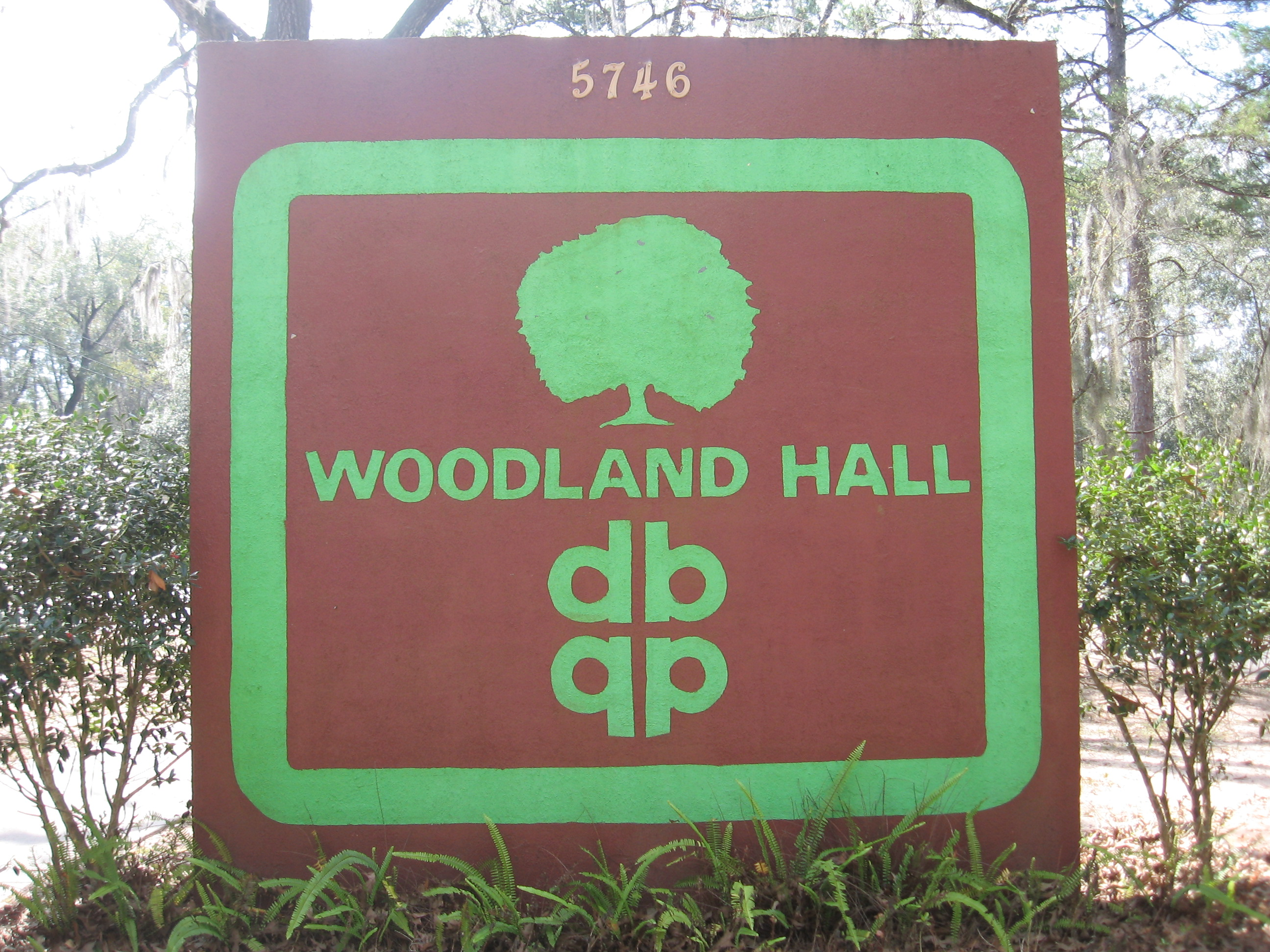

Location
- 5246 Centerville Rd. Tallahassee, Florida; USA

Information
- Type: Private
- Established: 1972
- Status: Closed
- Closed: 2018
- Principal: Amber Mitchell
- Grades: 1-12
- Enrollment: 29
- Colors: Navy Blue and White
- Mascot: Cougar
- Website: https://web.archive.org/*/http://www.woodlandhallacademy.org

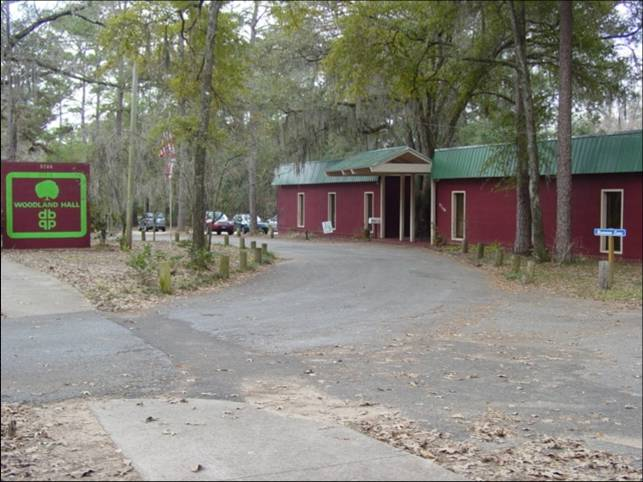
Woodland Hall Academy

Woodland Hall Academy was a small private school in Tallahassee, Florida, which catered to 1st to 12th grade students with dyslexia and ADHD. The campus was located approximately 2 miles north of I-10. At its closing, Woodland Hall had 8 teachers and 6 staff members, with a student-to-teacher ratio of 3.6:1.

== History ==
Woodland Hall was founded in 1972 in Charleston, South Carolina, in a rented white schoolhouse, and in 1975 transferred to a church building. In 1977, it moved to Tallahassee. The school was founded by Dr. Patricia K. Hardman, and was first known as the Dyslexia Research Institute. The program started as a summer school for children with learning disabilities and grew into a full-time school. The school closed in 2019 and admitted its last students in 2017.

== Students ==
At its closure, Woodland Hall had 22 students in grades 1–12. Previously, the total number of students ranged from 17 to 50. Many students went on to two- and four-year colleges.

== Campus ==
Woodland Hall is housed in a small school building of seven class rooms, one large room and a library, with the capacity to hold eleven classes at one time. The library holds 8,690 books in all.

The grounds include the main school building, two utility buildings, a playground, basketball court and a large field.

According to its archived web site (below) the school's buildings were purchased by Celebration Baptist Church, which allowed the school to use a classroom during its final year, 2018–2019.

== Class structure ==
Woodland Hall implemented a number of special approaches to facilitate learning for dyslexic and ADHD students. Classes were kept small, from one-on-one tutorials up to ten student classes. To help students overcome reading problems, classes used a highly structured teaching method that emphasizes repetition and review.

The schedule included a 15-minute period called D.E.A.R. (Drop Everything and Read) Time, where students broke from classes and read, or were read to by teachers.

Woodland Hall Academy enforced a medication-free environment. Students were required to be off behavior-modifying medications once they began attending, relying instead on the instructive methods to help students stay on task. The school itself was a sugar-free environment, and students' families were encouraged to regulate their diets at home. Strong scents such as perfumes and colognes wereprohibited at the school for the distractions they posed to the students.

== Clubs ==
Woodland Hall held Club Day on Friday afternoons, including a Games Club, Cooking Club, and Student Council.

== Sources ==
- 2018 archived web site
- Profile of Woodland Hall and information on identifying dyslexia.
- The Dyslexia Research Institute, parent organization of Woodland Hall.
- Reviews of Woodland Hall at greatschools.net.
- Woodland Hall at privateschoolreview.com.
