= Diabetes NSW & ACT =

Australian charity

- Founded: Sydney, Australia (27 July 1938)
- Type: Charity
- Purpose: To prevent diabetes and its complications
- Region served: New South Wales, Australia
- Key people: Leo Tutt (Chairman); Sturt Eastwood(CEO)
- Website: www.diabetesnsw.com.au
- Formerly called: Diabetes NSW; the Australian Diabetes Council; the Diabetic Association of NSW; Diabetes Australia NSW; the Diabetic Association of Australia

Diabetes NSW & ACT is a charitable organization for New South Wales (NSW) and the Australian Capital Territory (ACT) that assists people living with or at risk of diabetes, their families and carers. It is a member organization of Diabetes Australia and is the oldest and largest diabetes organization in Australia.

== History ==
The Diabetic Association of Australia was formed in 1938. In 1956 the Diabetes Federation of Australia was formed and New South Wales changed its name to the Diabetic Association of NSW. In 2010, the name was changed to the Australian Diabetes Council, but in April 2014, after a change in the leadership, the organisation became known as Diabetes NSW. In 2016 following the merger with Diabetes ACT the organisation became known as Diabetes NSW & ACT - the peak consumer body for diabetes in New South Wales and the ACT.

The organisation provides support and services to people living with and at risk of diabetes, their families, carers, friends and allied health professionals in New South Wales and the ACT. Diabetes NSW & ACT has 47,000 members in New South Wales.

== Organisation ==
Diabetes NSW & ACT’s head office is located in Glebe, Sydney.

Diabetes NSW & ACT is a member-based charity dedicated to helping people living with or at risk of diabetes, their families and their carers. The priority for the organisation is the health and wellbeing of the diabetes community and they provide services, programs and support to help them live their lives to the full

== Patron ==
The Governor of NSW is the patron of Diabetes NSW & ACT.

== Programs ==
Diabetes NSW & ACT runs a range of community programs including education forums and events targeting the different needs of people living with type 1 and type 2 diabetes, preventative diet and fitness programs, camps to help young people and their families create connections and learn how to confidently manage their diabetes, teacher and carer training as well as broad-based community education to raise public awareness of the condition and its complications.
