= Felkel, Florida =

Unincorporated community in Florida, U.S.

Coordinates: 30°35′54″N 84°06′55″W

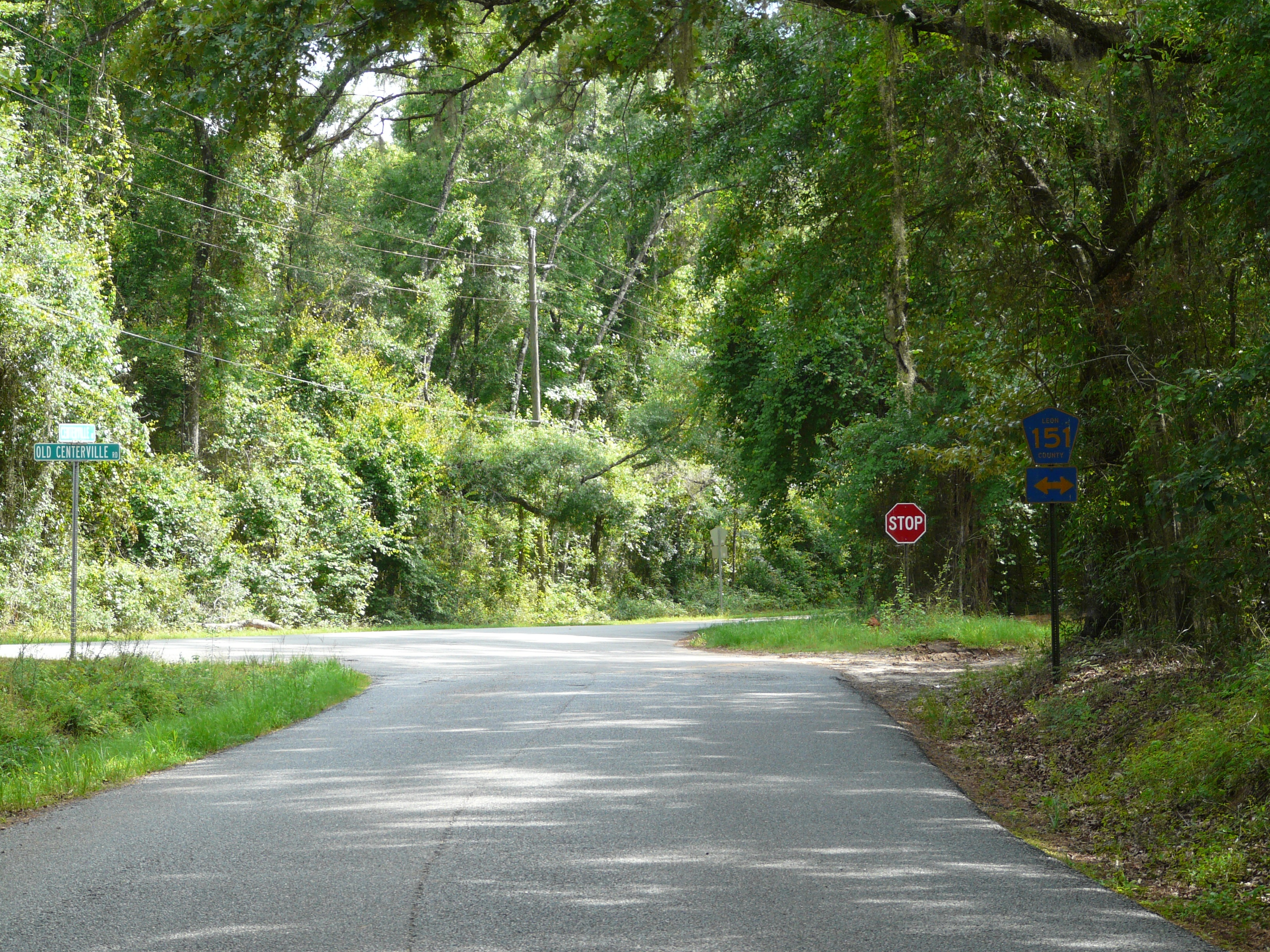
CR-0343 at CR-151 in Felkel

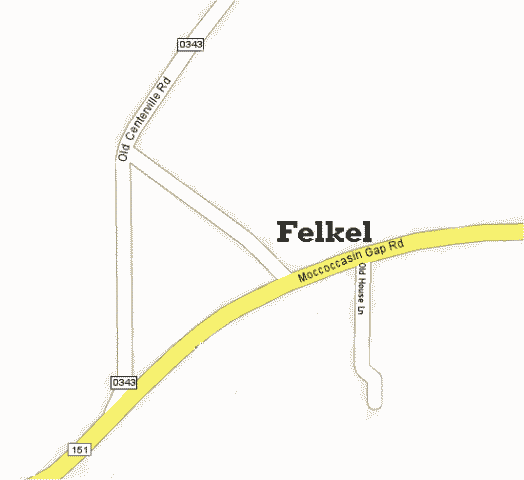
Location of Felkel, Florida

Felkel is an unincorporated community in Leon County, Florida, United States. It is the town that Bradley’s Country Store is located in, which is a country store located southwest of the town Felkel.
