= List of county roads in Leon County, Florida =

- County road shields used in Florida

Highway names
- Interstates: Interstate X (I-X)
- US Highways: U.S. Highway X (US X)
- State: State Road X (SR X)
- County: County Road X (CR X)

System links
- County roads in Florida; County roads in Leon County

The following is a list of county roads in Leon County, Florida. All county roads are maintained by the county in which they reside. Some three-digit county roads have also been signed with the number zero as a fourth digit.

== County roads in Leon County ==
Route	Road name(s)	From	To	Notes
CR 12	Fairbanks Ferry Road; Iamonia Cutoff Road	CR 12 at the Gadsden County line north-northwest of Meridian	US 319 (SR 61) in Iamonia	Former SR 12
CR 20	Crooked Road	dead end	SR 20	Former SR 20 at Ochlockonee River
CR 59	Veterans Memorial Drive	US 90 (SR 10) east-northeast of Wadesboro	Metcalfe Road at the Georgia state line north-northeast of Miccosukee	Former SR 59
CR 63A	Lakeshore Drive	US 27 (SR 63) / Lakeshore Drive in Tallahassee	SR 155 / CR 155 north of Tallahassee	Former SR 63A
CR 142	Old Magnolia Road	US 90 (SR 10) / SR 59 northeast of Wadesboro	CR 142 at the Jefferson County line northeast of Miccosukee	Former SR 142; portions are a dirt road.
CR 146	Meridian Street; Miccosukee Road	US 90 (SR 10) / Meridian Street in Tallahassee	US 319 (SR 261) / CR 0347 in Tallahassee	Former SR 146
CR 151	Magnolia Drive; Centerville Road; Moccasin Gap Road; Cromartie Road	SR 265 in Tallahassee	CR 142 east of Miccosukee	Former SR 142 and SR 151
CR 155	Meridian Road	SR 155 / CR 63A north of Tallahassee	Meridian Road north-northeast of Meridian	Former SR 155
CR 158	Tharpe Street	SR 263 / Tharpe Street in Tallahassee	US 27 (SR 63) / Tharpe Street in Tallahassee	Former SR 158 and SR 158A
CR 259	Tram Road	SR 363 in Tallahassee	CR 259 at the Jefferson County line south-southeast of Chaires	Former SR 261A
CR 260	Silver Lake Road	National Forest Road 371 / Silver Lake Road in Andrew	SR 20 west-northwest of Norfleet	Former SR 260
CR 261	Weems Road			Former SR 261 Not on 2026 map.
CR 265	Magnolia Drive	SR 61 / Magnolia Drive in Tallahassee	US 27 (SR 20) / SR 265 in Tallahassee	Former SR 265.
CR 267A	Helen Guard Station Road	SR 267	CR 2203	Former SR 267A.
CR 367	Blountstown Street	US 90 (SR 10) / SR 20 in Tallahassee	CR 158 in Tallahassee	Not on 2026 map.
CR 373	Orange Avenue; Blair Stone Road	SR 61 (FL)/SR 373 in Tallahassee	US 27 (SR 20) / Blair Stone Road in Tallahassee	
CR 375	Smith Creek Road	CR 375 at the Wakulla County line southwest of Fort Braden	SR 20 west of Bloxham	Former SR 375
CR 0338	Sunnyhill Road	US 319 (SR 61) northeast of Iamonia	CR 0343 east-northeast of Iamonia	All routes in the 0xxx series lack the leading 0 on the 2026 map. Partially a dirt road.
CR 0340	Pisgah Church Road	CR 0342	CR 151	
CR 0341	T.S. Green Road	CR 59 north-northeast of Miccosukee	CR 142 north-northeast of Miccosukee	
CR 0342	Bannerman Road; Bradfordville Road; Roberts Road	CR 155 / CR 0344 north of Tallahassee	CR 0345 in Tallahassee	Former SR 154 (SR 284) (west of US 319)
CR 0343	Old Centerville Road	CR 151 in Felkel	Springhill Road at the Georgia state line east-northeast of Iamonia	Partially a dirt road.
CR 0344	Orchard Pond Parkway	CR 0361 north-northwest of Tallahassee	CR 155 / CR 0342 north of Tallahassee	Toll road
CR 0345	Crump Road; Proctor Road	US 90 (SR 10) / CR 1543 east of Tallahassee	CR 151 / Proctor Road northeast of Tallahassee	
CR 0346	Ox Bottom Road; Velda Dairy Road	CR 155 in Tallahassee	CR 0342 in Bradfordville	Former SR 144.
CR 0347	Miccosukee Road	US 319 (SR 261) / CR 146 in Tallahassee	CR 151 in Miccosukee	Former SR 146
CR 0348	Baum Road; McCracken Road	CR 1541 in Baum	CR 0347 northeast of Tallahassee	Former SR 364 (east of US 90)
CR 0349	Thornton Road	US 90 (SR 10) northeast of Tallahassee	CR 0347 at the Miccosukee Canopy Road Greenway in Tallahassee	
CR 0351	Edenfield Road	US 90 (SR 10) northeast of Tallahassee	CR 0347 at the Miccosukee Canopy Road Greenway in Tallahassee	Former SR 146A
CR 0352	Timberlane Road	CR 155 / Timberlane Road north of Tallahassee	SR 61 / SR 160 in Tallahassee	Former SR 148
CR 0353	Dempsey Mayo Road	US 90 (SR 10)	CR 0347 at the Miccosukee Canopy Road Greenway northeast of Tallahassee	Former SR 146B
CR 0355	Lonnie Road	CR 151 in Tallahassee	CR 0353 east of Tallahassee	Signed but not on 2026 map.
CR 0356	Fred George Road	SR 263 / Don Hunter Road northwest of Tallahassee	US 27 (SR 63) / Crowder Road in Tallahassee	Former SR 263A
CR 0361	Old Bainbridge Road; Capital Circle; Old Bainbridge Road	Brevard Street / Macomb Street in Tallahassee	CR 153 at the Gadsden County line north-northwest of Tallahassee	Former SR 157
CR 0365	Mission Road	CR 158 in Tallahassee	Mission San Luis de Apalache	Former SR 158A; not on 2026 map.
CR 1540	Capitola Road	CR 1543 / Road to the Lake in Chaires	CR 158 at the Jefferson County line northeast of Capitola	Former SR 158
CR 1541	Baum Road; Wadesboro Road; Jefferson Road	CR 1540 in Capitola	US 90 (SR 10) north of Wadesboro	Former SR 364 (south of CR 0348)
CR 1543	Chaires Cross Road	US 27 (SR 20) / CR 2195 south of Chaires	US 90 (SR 10) / CR 0345 west-southwest of Wadesboro	
CR 1553	Pedrick Road	CR 1568 / Pedrick Road in Tallahassee	US 90 (SR 10) / Champagne Drive northeast of Tallahassee	Former SR 158
CR 1555	Gaines Street; Meridian Street; Franklin Boulevard	SR 61 in Tallahassee	US 90 (SR 10) / Terrace Street in Tallahassee	
CR 1557	Gadsden Street	CR 1555 in Tallahassee	SR 61 in Tallahassee	
CR 1559	Calhoun Street	CR 1555 / Calhoun Street in Tallahassee	SR 61 in Tallahassee	
CR 1568	Buck Lake Road	US 90 (SR 10) in Tallahassee	CR 1540 northeast of Capitola	Former SR 158; Signed to CR 1540 but the 2026 map terminates it at CR 1543
CR 1581	Aenon Church Road	SR 20 / Aenon Church Road west of Tallahassee	US 90 (SR 10) west of Tallahassee	
CR 1583	Barineau Road	SR 20 in Norfleet	US 90 (SR 10) west of Tallahassee	
CR 1585	Geddie Road	SR 20 west of Norfleet	US 90 (SR 10) / Sassy Tree Lane southeast of Ochlockonee	Former SR 260
CR 2192	Natural Bridge Road	SR 363 / Natural Bridge Road in Woodville	Natural Bridge Road / unnamed road at the Jefferson County line east-northeast of Woodville	
CR 2194	Jackson Bluff Road	SR 20 west of Tallahassee	SR 263 in Tallahassee	Not on 2026 map.
CR 2195	Old Plank Road; W.W. Kelley Road	Old Plank Road at the Wakulla County line southeast of Woodville	US 27 (SR 20) / CR 1543 south of Chaires	Former SR 154 Signed only north of CR 259.
CR 2196	Lafayette Street; Old St. Augustine Road	CR 1555 in Tallahassee	CR 2195 south of Chaires	Former SR 364 (part); part of the Old Spanish Trail
CR 2197	Williams Road	CR 2195 south-southwest of Chaires	US 27 (SR 20) west-southwest of Chaires	
CR 2203	Spring Hill Road	CR 373 at the Wakulla County line	SR 371 in Tallahassee	Former SR 373, SR 373A; Signed as CR 373A at SR 371
CR 2204	Oak Ridge Road	US 319 (SR 261) west of Woodville	SR 363 / Oak Ridge Road in Woodville	Former SR 260
CR 2205	Lake Bradford Road	SR 263 / International Drive at Tallahassee International Airport	SR 371 in Tallahassee	Former SR 371A
