= Capitola =

Capitola may refer to:

- Capitola, California
- Capitola, Florida
