= Vivian Bales =

American motorcycle stunt performer

- Born: January 19, 1908; Wacissa, Florida
- Died: December 12, 2001 (aged 93); Albany, Georgia
- Other name: Vivian Bales Faison
- Occupations: Dance instructor, seamstress and stunt rider
- Known for: First motorcycle magazine cover girl

Vivian Bales (19 Jan 1908 – 12 Dec 2001) was the first motorcycle cover girl. She was known for several long-distance motorcycle rides and stunts around the United States in the 1920s and 1930s.

== Early life ==
Bales was born in Wacissa, Florida and raised in Albany, Georgia. After leaving school, she worked as a seamstress and dance instructor, and in 1926, she bought her first motorcycle, a new Harley-Davidson Model B. She taught herself to ride on this motorcycle, and took her first long tour of 300 miles with a female friend from her home in Albany, Georgia to St. Petersburg, Florida. The Model B was a 350 cc, single cylinder, side-valve, with a manually shifted three-speed engine with a battery, and not a magneto ignition, and a fully floating seat. It was brought out to compete with the successful Indian Prince model and was called "the peashooter" for the sound of its exhaust. One of the first 'streamline' models, it sold for around $235.

== Cycling career ==
A Florida Harley-Davidson dealer heard the adventure, leading to a feature about it in the St. Petersburg, Florida newspaper, and then in the Atlanta Journal. Bales, planning longer journeys, traded in her Model B for a 1929 flathead engine D-series, Harley-Davidson's first 45 cu in (740 cc) motorcycle. She wrote to Hap Jameson, then editor of The Harley-Davidson Enthusiast magazine, telling him about her plans to make a longer solo trip. The Enthusiast motorcycle magazine was first published in 1916, 13 years after the first Harley-Davidson motorcycles built.

Bales knew little about riding motorcycles, and it took some time for her to learn how to kick-start the bike on her own at 5'2” and weighing 95 pounds. A friend of hers who had ridden motorcycles spent some time teaching her how to crank the bike, and soon enough, Bales became known all over Albany for being the girl with the motorcycle. Bales was appointed as the official goodwill "Enthusiast Girl" and while Harley-Davidson did not finance her journey, arrangements were made for Harley-Davidson dealers, Rotary Clubs and others on the route to provide accommodation, fuel, and maintenance.

Having only been riding for 3 years and aged 20, Bales started on 1 June 1929, taking 78 days to cover about 5,000 miles alone from Albany, Georgia to the Harley-Davidson factory in Milwaukee. On the way back, she traveled through Canada, Manhattan, the Carolinas and Washington, D.C. In Washington, Senator William J. Harris arranged for her to meet President Herbert Hoover wearing her trademark all white riding breeches, shirt, helmet, socks and sweater with "The Enthusiast Girl" across its chest. On the way, as a goodwill ambassador, she met many local dignitaries.

Bales became the first motorcycle magazine cover girl on the May and November 1929 editions, and her journeys were well documented in the December 1929 issue and by local papers all over the USA. She later became a stunt rider at motorcycle races in Tallahassee, Florida. Her last ride was at the age of 86.

== Personal life ==
To Arthur Davidson she was "The Georgia Peach." For Bales, the motorcycle was a "key to the whole United States."

She eventually married William Faison and the couple adopted 3 children. Bales died on December 12, 2001 at the age of 93. At her funeral, she was honored by a procession of Harley-Davidsons.
