= Louis Washington =

American singer

- Also known as: Tallahassee Tight
- Born: Louis Jackson; October 1895; Wadesboro, Florida, United States
- Died: Unknown (after 1934)
- Genres: Blues, Gospel
- Instrument: Guitar
- Years active: 1933–1934
- Labels: American Records Corporation, New York

Louis Washington (reportedly born Louis Jackson, October 1895 – after 1934), also known by his bluesman name, Tallahassee Tight, was an American musician, performing both gospel music and blues.

According to researchers Bob Eagle and Eric LeBlanc, he was born in Wadesboro, Florida, in 1895. His limited output was all recorded, as far as is known, by the American Record Corporation in New York in 1934, and is essentially limited to one relatively modern release: East Coast Blues & Gospel Songs, Document Records DOCD-5387, 1995. This recording also includes the work of his contemporary, Spark Plug Smith.

Washington used his real name for his gospel singing, but apparently preferred to use Tallahassee Tight when singing blues. It is believed that he was from northwest Florida, based not only on his choice of nicknames, but also from several of his songs: "Tallahassee Women", "Quincy Wimmens", and "Coast Line Blues". Quincy, Florida is approximately 20 miles from Tallahassee, and the Coast Line refers to the Seaboard Air Line Railroad which passes through Tallahassee.

In 1995, an album was released by Document Records of the music of Louis Washington/Tallahassee Tight and Spark Plug Smith. The album indicates that the music was originally recorded in 1933 and 1934.

According to Bruce Bastin, "Of limited musical interest, but completely within the guitar traditions of the Southeast, Louis Washington may have the distinction of being the one recorded resident Florida Bluesman of the period of commercial blues recording".
