= Florida State Road 151 =

State highway in Florida, United States

State Road 151

Route information
- Maintained by FDOT
- Length: 19.9 mi (32.0 km)

Location
- Country: United States
- State: Florida
- County: Leon

Highway system
- Florida State Highway System; Interstate; US; State; Former; Pre‑1945; Toll; Scenic

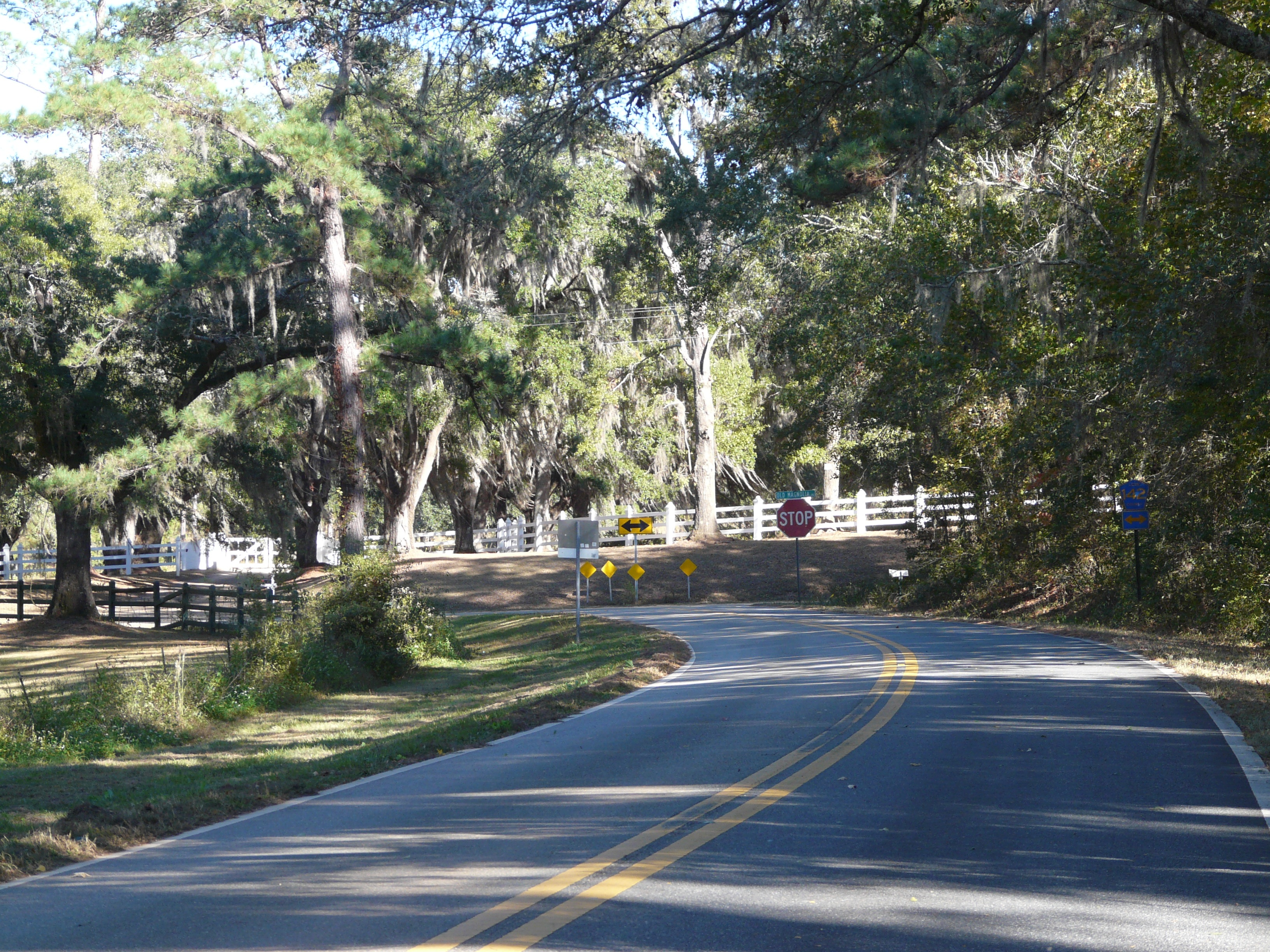
Northern terminus at CR-142

State Road 151 (SR 151), now County Road 151 (CR 151), is a former state route in northeastern Leon County, Florida.

Beginning at the junction of SR 265 and Seventh Avenue, the route travels northeast along Centerville Road and Moccasin Gap Road across Capital Circle to CR 142 (Old Magnolia Road) east of Miccosukee.

West of CR 59, CR 151 is a designated canopy road over which trees have been allowed to extend their branches.

== Major intersections ==
The entire route is in Leon County.

Location	mi	km	Destinations	Notes
Tallahassee	0.0	0.0	SR 265 south (Magnolia Drive) / Seventh Avenue	
Tallahassee	1.7	2.7	Blair Stone Road	
Tallahassee	2.2	3.5	US 319 (Capital Circle Northeast / SR 261) – Airport	
Tallahassee	2.4	3.9	Welaunee Boulevard	
Tallahassee	8.1	13.0	CR 0342 (Bradfordville Road / Roberts Road)	
	11.8	19.0	CR 0345 south (Proctor Road)	
Felkel	13.4	21.6	CR 0343 north (Old Centerville Road)	
Miccosukee	18.2	29.3	CR 0347 south (Miccosukee Road)	
Miccosukee	18.4	29.6	CR 59 (Veterans Memorial Drive)	
	19.9	32.0	CR 142 (Old Magnolia Road)	
1.000 mi = 1.609 km; 1.000 km = 0.621 mi

== See also ==
- List of former state roads in Florida
