= Florida State Road 155 =

State highway in Florida, United States

State Road 155
- Meridian Road
- Florida State Road 155 highlighted in red

Route information
- Maintained by FDOT
- Length: 2.574 mi (4.142 km)

Major junctions
- South end: SR 61 in Tallahassee
- North end: CR 63A near Tallahassee

Location
- Country: United States
- State: Florida
- Counties: Leon

Highway system
- Florida State Highway System; Interstate; US; State; Former; Pre‑1945; Toll; Scenic
← SR 152	→ SR 157

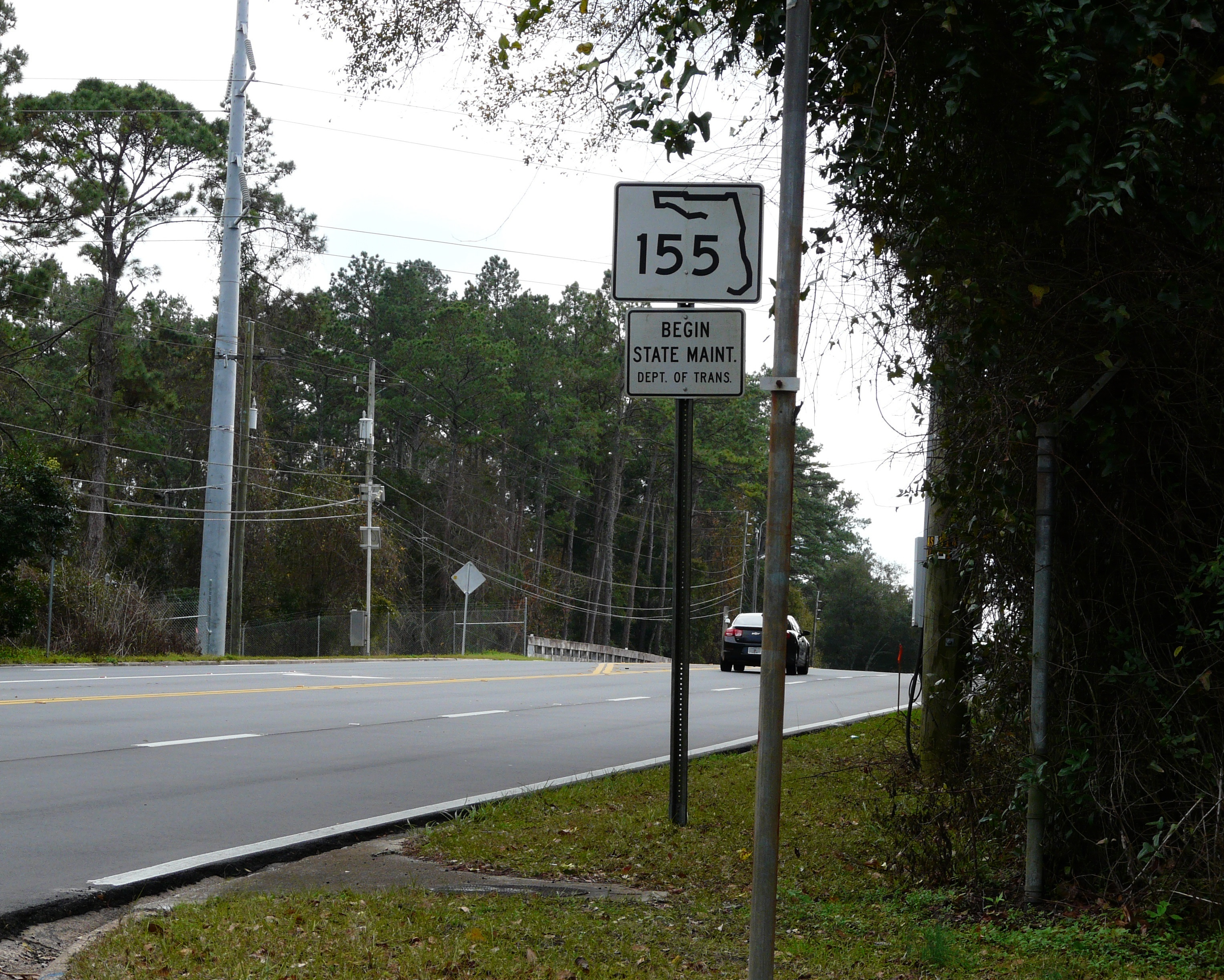
SR 155's northern terminus

State Road 155 (SR 155) is a north–south route in Tallahassee.

State Road 155 is signed over a portion of Meridian Road in northern Tallahassee; the rest of the road is County Road 155.

== Major intersections ==
The entire route is in Leon County.

Location	mi	km	Destinations	Notes
Tallahassee	0.000	0.000	Seventh Avenue	right turn only; SR 155 north has access from SR 61 south (Thomasville Road)
	2.574	4.142	CR 155 north (Meridian Road) / Lakeshore Drive (CR 63A west)	
			CR 0344 (Orchard Pond Parkway)	
1.000 mi = 1.609 km; 1.000 km = 0.621 mi
