= Capitola, Florida =

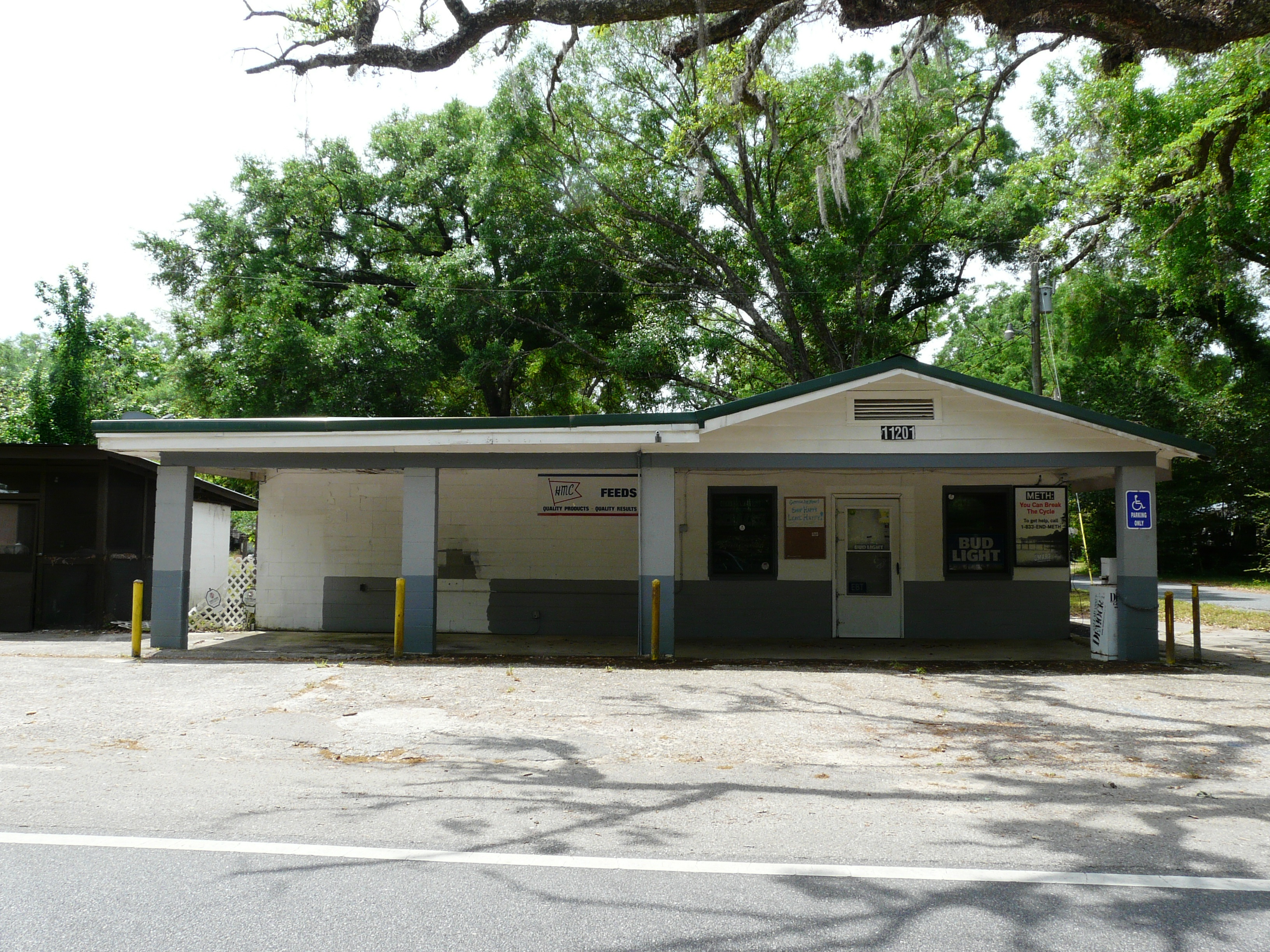
- Capitola Joy Mart

- Location within Florida Location within the United States
- Country: United States
- State: Florida
- County: Leon
- Elevation: 125 ft (38 m)

Population (2020)
  - Total: 247
- ZIP code: 32317 (Tallahassee, FL)
- GNIS feature ID: 2805171

Capitola is a census-designated place (CDP) in eastern Leon County, Florida, United States, located at County Road 1540 (Capitola Road) and County Road 1541 (Baum Road). The population was 247 at the 2020 census. It is part of the Tallahassee metropolitan area.

== History ==
Evergreen Hills Plantation, a large cotton plantation, occupied the land that is now or extremely close to Capitola. From 1908 through the 1940s Capitola was served by the Florida Central Railroad. Capitola was originally called the town of Mays. Some of the first families that moved into Capitola were the Duprees, Boyds, and the Upchurches.

On March 7, 2008, a confirmed EF1 tornado struck the community with winds estimated at 105 miles per hour. Six to eight houses were damaged near the intersection of Capitola and Whitehouse roads. One minor injury was reported.

== Today ==
The small town of Capitola, with just a few dozen residents in eastern Leon County, is near Chaires to the southwest. Fire and rescue services are provided to the community by the Chaires-Capitola Volunteer Fire Department.

The center of town is marked by the Capitola Joy Mart, a small grocery / convenience store. The area is also home to the Capitola Baptist Church which was established in 1926 and The Capitola Cemetery, where the towns namesake is buried, Capitola DuPree. The Cemetery is located off of Cap Tram road in a wooded area. Capitola is known for its typical southern landscapes with several farms.

Capitola is also home to the Chaires-Capitola Volunteer Fire Department.

== Demographics ==
Capitola first appeared as a census designated place in the 2020 U.S. census.
