= Bannerman Plantation =

- U.S. National Register of Historic Places
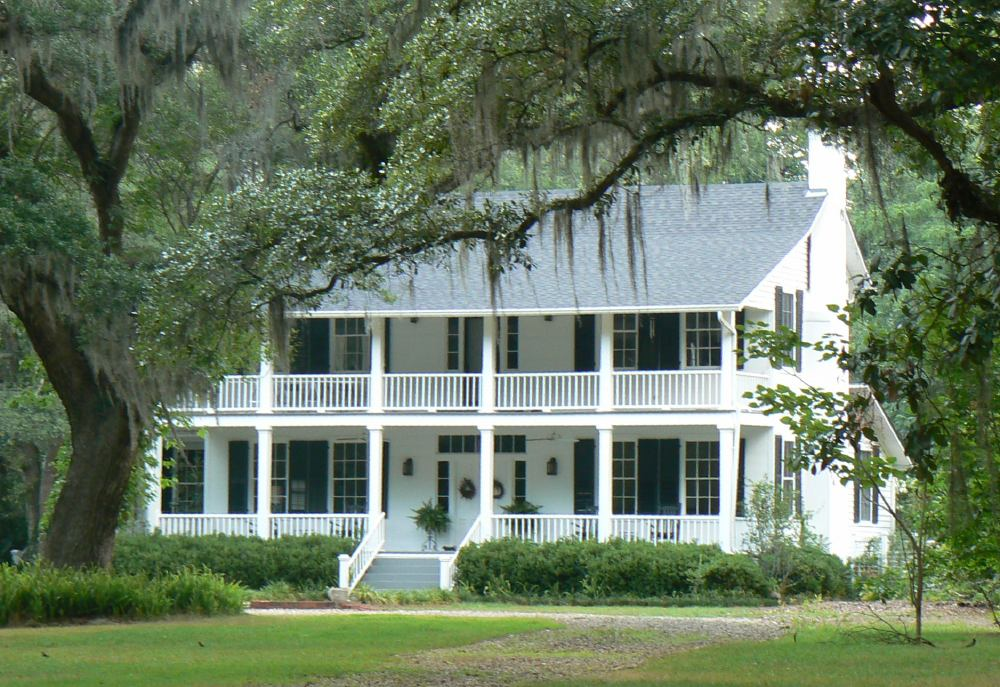

- Location within Florida Location within the United States
- Location: Leon County, Florida
- Nearest city: Tallahassee
- Coordinates: 30°38′42″N 84°16′44″W
- Architectural style: Greek Revival, Federal
- NRHP reference No.: 02000606
- Added to NRHP: June 6, 2002

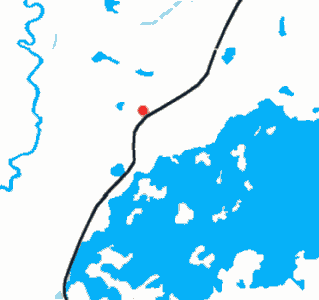
Location of Bannerman Plantation house west and northwest of Lake Iamonia

Bannerman Plantation was a forced-labor farm of about 1,500 acres (610 ha) and located in northwest Leon County, Florida, just north of the old unincorporated community of Meridian and west-northwest of Lake Iamonia. Bannerman Plantation was established in 1852 or earlier by Charles Bannerman of North Carolina, who by 1860 had enslaved 67 people to work his land.

The plantation house is located at 13426 N. Meridian Rd. and is a 2-story home with porches on both floors that partially wrap to each side of the house. The porches are supported with eight stately columns. Fireplaces are located at both left and right sides of the home. A kitchen extends off the left side of the home. The boundaries of Bannerman Plantation itself are unknown.

The Leon County Florida 1860 Agricultural Census shows that Bannerman Plantation had the following:

- Improved Land: 700 acres (280 ha)
- Unimproved Land: 800 acres (320 ha)
- Cash value of plantation: $14,475
- Cash value of farm implements/machinery: $700
- Cash value of farm animals: $5000
- Number of slaves: 67
- Bushels of corn: 4,000
- Bales of cotton: 120
