= Wacissa River =

River in Florida, United States of America

Coordinates: 30.3746767°N 83.8122081°W

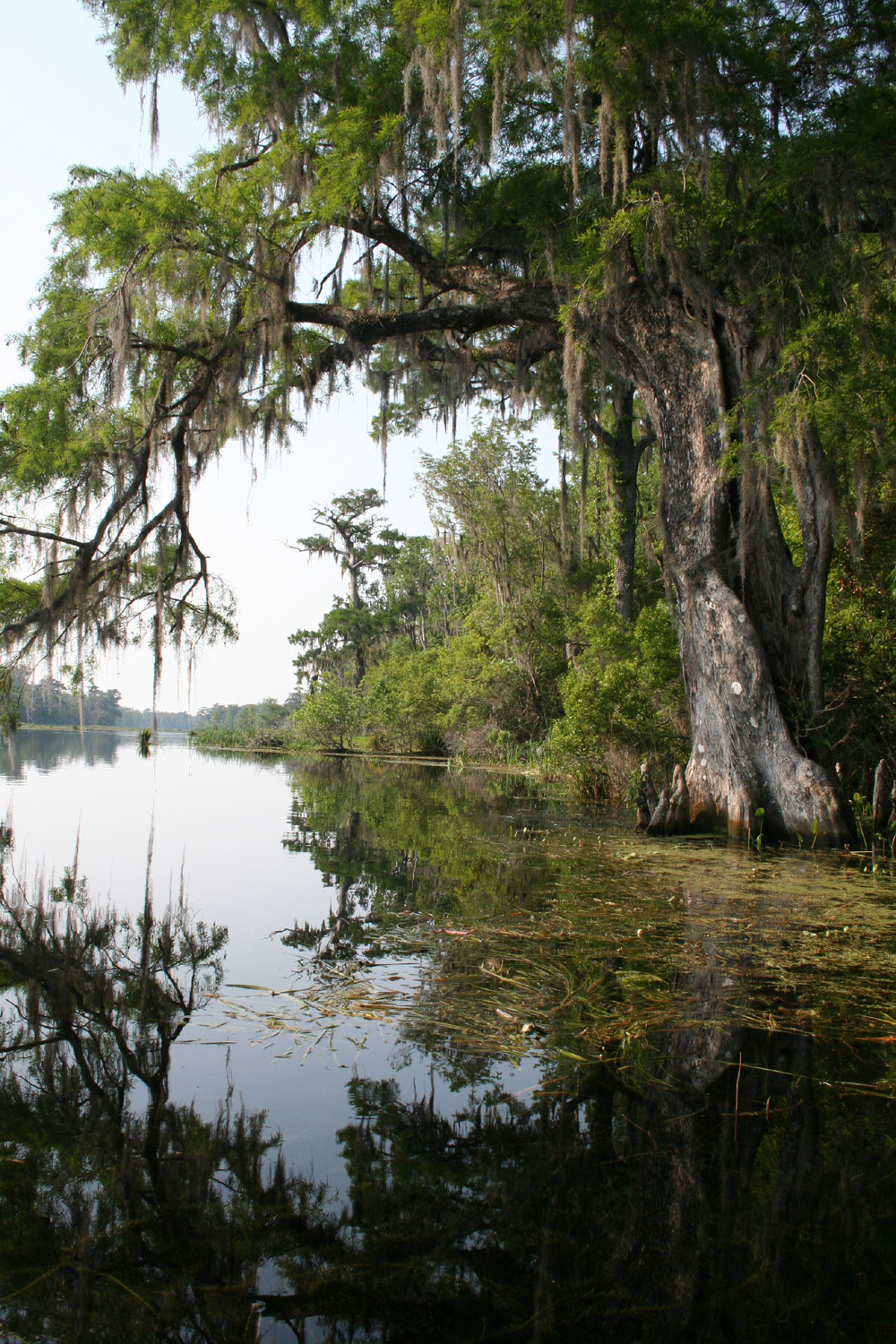
The Wacissa River

The Wacissa River is a large, spring-fed stream located in south-central Jefferson County, Florida. Its headwaters are located about 1-mile (1.6 km) south of the town of Wacissa, where the river emerges crystal clear from a group of large limestone springs. From its headsprings, the river flows approximately 12 miles (19 km) south through a broad cypress swamp before breaking into numerous braided channels which join the Aucilla River a few miles further south. The river is managed by the Florida Fish & Wildlife Conservation Commission as part of the Aucilla Wildlife Management Area, and has been declared an Outstanding Florida Waterway by the Florida Department of Environmental Protection.

== The Wacissa Springs ==
The springs that feed the Wacissa River emerge in a bottomland forest below the Cody Scarp, a relic marine terrace marked by a line of hills to the north. According to the Florida Bureau of Geology, the group of springs

consist of at least 12 known springs scattered along the upper 1.5 miles (2.4 km) of the Wacissa River. Land to the east and west of the river is flat and swampy and surface elevations are little more than 3 feet (0.91 m) above river level. The area immediately adjoining the river and springs is densely forested with cypress, oak, some pine, and generally moderate undergrowth. To the north, less than a mile from the head of the river, the land becomes hilly, rising in most parts more than 100 feet (30 m) above the lowland. The river is generally clear and cool, averaging 21 °C (70 °F) ... The distribution of springs in, as well as adjacent to, the Wacissa River and the heavy surface cover of aquatic plants makes difficult to impractical the reliable measurement [of the water flow] of individual springs ... The average flow [of the river] from August 1971 through September 1974 was 389 cubic feet per second.

== Natural history ==
The flora is typical for a freshwater swamp in the deep southeast; pond cypress and bald cypress dominate the banks, followed by sweetbay, maple, sweet gum, hickories and oaks, as well as magnolias, holly, willow, and sabal palms. The water itself is heavily vegetated. The exotics, Water hyacinth and hydrilla, dominate the upper reaches of the river. The spring runs themselves are often home to pickerel weed, arrowhead, elodea and eel grass. Wild flowers are also present, including several varieties of water lilies.

The Wacissa is well known for its large concentration of aquatic birds, including egrets, herons, ibis, osprey, wood storks, limpkins, anhingas, kingfishers, barred owls and bald eagles. Aquatic animals are also abundant, including alligators, river otters, turtles, water snakes, and crayfish. The main species of fish are bass, mullet, catfish, red-breasted sunfish, stumpknocker and gar, although the warmouth perch, speckled perch, flier bream, and shellcracker may also found in the Wacissa.

According to George L. Thurston III's 1976 report on the Wacissa for the Canoe Trail Atlas:

Two centuries ago, open stands of virgin longleaf pine grew on the stony upland north of the extensive hardwood hammock at Nuttal Rise. West of the Wacissa, a wild swampy pineland was sprinkled with outcroppings of chert. The whole region of some 400 square miles (1,000 km^{2}) swarmed with dear, bear, bobcat, wild turkey and bobwhites, as well as migratory birds and waterfowl by the billions. The limited use made of the river prior to the Civil War, for barging cotton to Newport from Jefferson County plantations, largely ended after the war and the area remained essential virgin. Late in the nineteenth century, the Wacissa area became well-known to ornithologists because of ivory-billed woodpeckers which were then fairly common there ... In 1930 the entire Wacissa watershed was clear-cut by timber companies which sold the pine and bald cypress lumber. The grades on which they built their tram roads still criss-cross the area, forming the basis for most of the dirt roads which now provide access to the river. Removal of the forest had remarkable results. When naturalist, Herbert Stoddard, Senior, visited the area in 1932 after the absence of some years, he reported the entire ecology of the lower river was "drastically changed." Instead of the shallow, clear stream he had once visited, he found it running high and dark in all seasons. Apple snails, which depend on clear, lime-laden water, survived only in the upper reaches of the river near the springs. Birds such as limpkin and egret which feed on the snails, had become as scarce as the snails.

Although much of the Wacissa forest is now some 85 years into recovery, logging activities are still common in the area. Large portions of the adjacent lands—though managed by the state of Florida—are owned by the St. Joe Company. However, the company has agreed not to cut trees in the immediate vicinity of the river. Today, the Wacissa is used almost exclusively for recreational purposes, including swimming, boating, fishing and birdwatching.
