= George L. Thurston III =

American journalist (1925–2001)

George Lee Thurston
- Born: October 1, 1925
- Died: March 20, 2001 (aged 75)
- Occupation: Investigative journalist

George Lee Thurston III (October 1, 1925 – March 20, 2001) was an investigative reporter and writer. He worked in broadcast television, newspapers, radio and book writing, editing and publishing. Around 1957, Thurston and three fellow members of the Florida Capital Press Corps wired the state House and Senate chambers for sound so that broadcast reporters could include original audio in their newscasts. Thurston was the first broadcast reporter to cover the Florida Legislature year-round. His over 50-year-long career in journalism included covering local, state and federal government, as well as politics, crime and corruption, genealogy, amateur radio (his call letters were W4MLE, which he clarified by saying "Washing 4 Muddy Little Elephants," referring to his four children), and camping, canoeing and fishing.

Thurston's off-camera interests also included history, electronics, technology, and science. Growing up in rural Culpeper, Virginia, Thurston kept a lab in his mother's attic, where he would dissect frogs and other animals and teach himself chemistry. After learning chemistry and earning the equivalent of a GED, Thurston won a full scholarship to William and Mary College after acing a chemistry competition. But journalism tugged at him and he followed in the footsteps of four previous generations.

While pursuing his journalism career, Thurston became a well-versed genealogist and conducted extensive research about his family's ancestry, eventually keeping track of it in a computer program called AskSam. His early research was documented through a comprehensive hard-copy cataloguing system using index cards. Thurston often wrote for Ancestry long before it became Ancestry.com; his articles focused on teaching readers how to conduct their own genealogy research. George loved talking about family history and helping others with their research. He wrote about the Rodenberry / Rodenbery family as well as other families. He also loved talking about his own ancestors, including those who immigrated from England to America on the Mayflower; his distant relative, Prudence Crandall, who was the first in the country to establish a private school for black females; and how he was the fifth consecutive generation of journalists in the Thurston family tree.

"The Roddenberry/Roddenbery Family Book | Descendants and Ancestors of George Rottenberry/Roddenberry, Revolutionary War Veteran of South Carolina and Georgia," wasn't the only book Thurston penned. He also researched and wrote "Wacissa River: Canoe trail Atlas" in January 1976. The Wacissa River—located in Northwest Florida, just south of Tallahassee, where Thurston lived from 1952 until his death in 2001—was one of Thurston's favorite places to canoe and fish. He spent many weekends canoeing the river from the Wacissa Springs boat ramp to Goose Pasture, a 10.5-mile run, camping on the river's shore along the way. His wife and children, driving two cars, would drop Thurston off at the boat ramp and then drive his van to Goose Pasture, where it would sit until he arrived by canoe, usually between Sunday morning and mid-afternoon.

During Thurston's last few months of life, he and his youngest child, Karen, finished "Hopa | Memoirs of a German Immigrant to America," a journal by William Mohrmann, who escaped the Great Chicago Fire, worked as a railroad freight clerk, saw Abraham Lincoln often along Lincoln's presidential campaign trail, learned English by attending political rallies and prayer meetings during a feverish presidential election year, was naturalized on election day so he could vote, and then fought the Civil War wearing a blue uniform. While Mohrmann wrote the journal, Thurston edited the manuscript, and he and Karen ensured the book was published in time for Thurston to sign a large batch of copies. He died just days after he was no longer able to sign them. Earlier in his career, Thurston contributed to several books, including "The Florida Handbook" in 1981, writing about the Apalachicola River and Anne Rule's "The Stranger Beside Me," about serial killer Ted Bundy (Thurston extensively covered Bundy's trials in Florida).
