= Tallahassee metropolitan area =

Metropolitan area in Florida, United States

Coordinates: 30.3°N 84.2°W

- Metropolitan Statistical Area; Combined Statistical Area
- Tallahassee, FL Metropolitan Statistical Area; Tallahassee—Bainbridge, FL-GA Combined Statistical Area
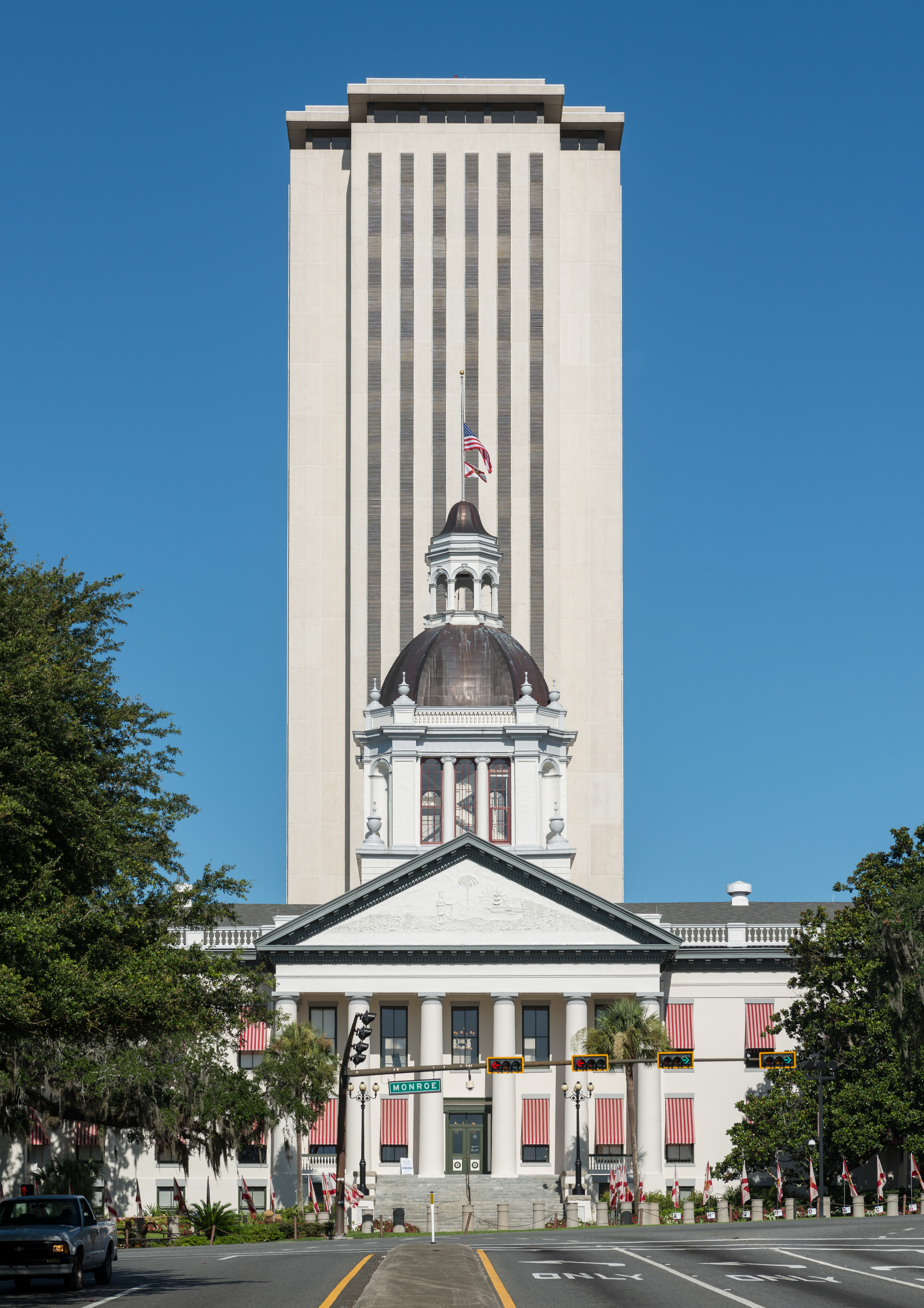
- Florida Capitol buildings (Old Capitol in foreground)
Interactive Map of Tallahassee–Bainbridge, FL–GA CSA
City of Tallahassee
Tallahassee, Florida MSA
Bainbridge, Georgia
- Country: United States
- State(s): Florida; Georgia
- Counties: Leon; Gadsden; Wakulla; Jefferson; Decatur, Georgia
- Principal city: Tallahassee
- Other cities: Bainbridge, Georgia; Quincy; Midway; Chattahoochee; Monticello

Area
  - MSA: 2,610 sq mi (6,750 km^{2})
  - CSA: 3,230 sq mi (8,360 km^{2})

Population (2020)
  - Total: 384,298
  - Estimate (2023): 392,645
  - CSA (2020): 413,665
  - CSA (2023): 421,732

GDP
  - MSA: $22.394 billion (2022)
- Time zone: UTC-5 (EST)
  - Summer (DST): UTC-4 (EDT)

The Tallahassee metropolitan area is the metropolitan area centered on Tallahassee, the capital of the U.S. state of Florida, in Leon County. It is located in the center of North Florida in the Florida panhandle.

The Tallahassee, FL Metropolitan Statistical Area is a metropolitan statistical area (MSA) designated by the Office of Management and Budget and used by the Census Bureau and other agencies for statistical purposes. The Tallahassee Metropolitan Statistical Area consists of the following four Florida counties: Leon, Gadsden, Wakulla, and Jefferson.

The Tallahassee–Bainbridge, FL-GA Combined Statistical Area is a combined statistical area (CSA) is a primary statistical area that includes the Tallahassee, FL Metropolitan Statistical Area and the Bainbridge, GA Micropolitan Statistical Area (μSA), which consists solely of the Georgia county of Decatur.

Additionally, the Thomasville, GA μSA is immediately adjacent to the Tallahassee MSA to the northeast. The distance and driving time between the Thomasville and Tallahassee city centers during commuting hours is both five miles and 5-10 minutes shorter than those between the Bainbridge and Tallahassee city centers.

== History ==
The Tallahassee Standard Metropolitan Statistical Area was first defined in 1965, and at that time included only Leon County. Wakulla County was added to the MSA in 1973. In 1983, Wakulla County was removed from the MSA and Gadsden County was added. Jefferson County and Wakulla County (for the second time) were added to the MSA in 2003.

== Geography ==
The counties of the Tallahassee Metropolitan Area cover an area of around 2,604 sq mi (6,750 km^{2}), of which around 2,390 sq mi (6,1890 km^{2}) is land. Much of that water area is in Wakulla and Jefferson counties along the coastline of Apalachee Bay. Only 141.33 sq mi (366.04 km^{2}), or 5.92%, of the area is urbanized, with nearly 80% of said urban area belonging to the Tallahassee, FL Urban Area.

Greater Tallahassee straddles the boundaries of the Red Hills Region, the Cody Scarp, and the Woodville Karst Plain. As such, the northern half of the metropolitan area, including much of the city of Tallahassee, is substantially more hilly than the rest of the state of Florida. The area also straddles four watersheds, from west to east: Apalachicola, Ochlockonee, St. Marks, and Aucilla. The latter three all drain into the Gulf of Mexico either within or at the edges of the metropolitan area, with the Ocholockonee and Aucilla Rivers forming parts of the western and eastern borders.

Also see Leon County Geology

All counties in both the Tallahassee MSA and CSA are in Eastern Time Zone, with the western border of Gadsden County with Jackson County forming the boundary with the Central Time Zone.

== Demographics ==
Historical population
Census	Pop.	Note	%±
1970	103,047		—
1980	159,542		54.8%
1990	233,598		46.4%
2000	284,539		21.8%
2010	367,413		29.1%
2020	384,298		4.6%
2023 (est.)	392,645		2.2%
U.S. Decennial Census 1970: Only Leon; 1980: Leon and Wakulla; 1990-2000: Leon and Gadsden 2010-2023: Leon, Gadsden, Wakulla, Jefferson

As of the census of 2000, there were 320,304 people, 125,533 households, and 75,306 families residing within the MSA. The racial makeup of the MSA was 63.59% White, 32.17% African American, and 1.39% from two or more races. 3.72% were Hispanic or Latino of any race.

The median income for a household in the MSA was $34,728, and the median income for a family was $42,957. Males had a median income of $29,628 versus $24,977 for females. The per capita income for the MSA was $17,552.

=== Tallahassee, FL Metropolitan Statistical Area ===
County	Seat	2025 estimate	2020 Census	Change	Land area	Density
Leon	Tallahassee	299,048	292,198	+2.34%	667 sq mi (1,730 km^{2})	448/sq mi (173/km^{2})
Gadsden	Quincy	44,298	43,826	+1.08%	516 sq mi (1,340 km^{2})	86/sq mi (33/km^{2})
Wakulla	Crawfordville	38,089	33,764	+12.81%	606 sq mi (1,570 km^{2})	63/sq mi (24/km^{2})
Jefferson	Monticello	16,007	14,510	+10.32%	598 sq mi (1,550 km^{2})	27/sq mi (10/km^{2})
Total		397,442	384,298	+3.42%	2,387 sq mi (6,180 km^{2})	167/sq mi (64/km^{2})

=== Tallahassee–Bainbridge, FL–GA Combined Statistical Area ===
Statistical Area	2025 estimate	2020 Census	Change	Land area	Density
Tallahassee, FL Metropolitan Statistical Area	397,442	384,298	+3.42%	2,387 sq mi (6,180 km^{2})	167/sq mi (64/km^{2})
Bainbridge, GA Micropolitan Statistical Area	29,432	29,367	+0.22%	597 sq mi (1,550 km^{2})	49/sq mi (19/km^{2})
Total	426,874	413,665	+3.19%	2,984 sq mi (7,730 km^{2})	143/sq mi (55/km^{2})

== Places of Interest ==
Also see Tallahassee Places of interest and Arts and Culture.

=== National, State, and Local Protected Areas ===
- Alfred B. Maclay Gardens State Park
- Apalachicola National Forest
- DeSoto Site Historic State Park
- Edward Ball Wakulla Springs State Park
- Elinor Klapp-Phipps Park
- Lake Jackson Mounds Archaeological State Park
- Lake Talquin State Forest and Park
- Letchworth-Love Mounds Archaeological State Park
- Miccosukee Canopy Road Greenway
- Natural Bridge Battlefield Historic State Park
- Ochlockonee River State Park
- San Marcos de Apalache Historic State Park
- St. Marks National Wildlife Refuge
- St. Marks River Preserve State Park
- Wakulla State Forest

== Communities ==
The Tallahassee Metropolitan Area has eight incorporated cities and two incorporated towns, along with thirteen additional populated areas defined as a census-designated place (CDP) by the U.S. Census Bureau as of the 2020 census. The Combined Statistical Area has an additional three cities, one town, and one CDP. As of 2020, the city of Tallahassee contained 51% and 47% of the MSA and CSA populations, respectively.

#	City	Type	County	2020 population
1	Tallahassee*	City	Leon	196,169
2	Bradfordville	CDP	Leon	19,183
3	Bainbridge*	City	Decatur	14,468
4	Quincy*	City	Gadsden	7,970
5	Crawfordville*	CDP	Wakulla	4,853
6	Woodville	CDP	Leon	4,097
7	Midway	City	Gadsden	3,537
8	Chattahoochee	City	Gadsden	2,955
9	Monticello*	City	Jefferson	2,589
10	Havana	Town	Gadsden	1,753
11	Gretna	City	Gadsden	1,357
12	Fort Braden	CDP	Leon	1,045
13	Panacea	CDP	Wakulla	735
14	Greensboro	Town	Gadsden	461
15	Attapulgus	City	Decatur	454
16	Sopchoppy	City	Wakulla	426
17	Miccosukee	CDP	Leon	383
18	Wacissa	CDP	Jefferson	362
19	Chaires	CDP	Leon	308
20	Climax	City	Decatur	276
21	St. Marks	City	Wakulla	274
22	Waukeenah	CDP	Jefferson	259
23	Capitola	CDP	Leon	247
24	Brinson	Town	Decatur	217
25	Lloyd	CDP	Jefferson	187
26	Lamont	CDP	Jefferson	170
27	Faceville	CDP	Decatur	136
28	Aucilla	CDP	Jefferson	103

*denotes largest city and county chair

== See also ==
- Florida statistical areas
