= Florida State Road 265 =

State highway in Florida, United States

State Road 265
- SR 265 in red, former SR 265 (signed as CR 265) in grey

Route information
- Maintained by FDOT
- Length: 1.431 mi (2.303 km)

Major junctions
- South end: US 27 / CR 265 in Tallahassee
- US 90 in Tallahassee
- North end: CR 151 in Tallahassee

Location
- Country: United States
- State: Florida
- Counties: Leon

Highway system
- Florida State Highway System; Interstate; US; State; Former; Pre‑1945; Toll; Scenic
← SR 263	→ SR 267

State Road 265 (SR 265) is a short north–south route in Tallahassee.

== Route description ==
SR 265 runs along Magnolia Drive from U.S. Route 27 (US 27; Apalachee Parkway) north to Seventh Avenue, crossing US 90 (Tennessee Street). North of Miccosukee Road (County Road 146 or CR 146), the road continues past Tallahassee Memorial Hospital. At the intersection with Seventh Avenue and the hospital entrance, Centerville Road continues as CR 151.

== History ==
SR 265 was established by January 1980 running along the same routing it does today. By October 1993, the state highway was extended south and west along Magnolia Drive to end at SR 61 south of downtown Tallahassee. Currently, signage along this portion of the road at its two endpoints show this road as County Road 265 (CR 265). Some agencies show this portion of the road as a county road, such as Tallahassee Public Works, while others, such as Florida Department of Transportation's GIS data hub, do not list it as a county road.

== Major intersections ==
The entire route is in Tallahassee, Leon County.

mi	km	Destinations	Notes
0.000	0.000	US 27 (Apalachee Parkway / SR 20) / CR 265 south (Magnolia Drive)	
0.750	1.207	US 90 (Tennessee Street / SR 10)	
1.296	2.086	CR 146 (Miccosukee Road)	
1.431	2.303	Centerville Road (CR 151 north) / Seventh Avenue	
1.000 mi = 1.609 km; 1.000 km = 0.621 mi
