= Meridian, Florida =

Unincorporated community in Florida, U.S.

Coordinates: 30°38′19″N 84°16′55″W

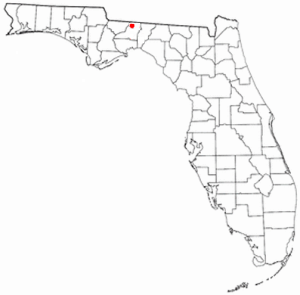
Location of Meridian, Florida

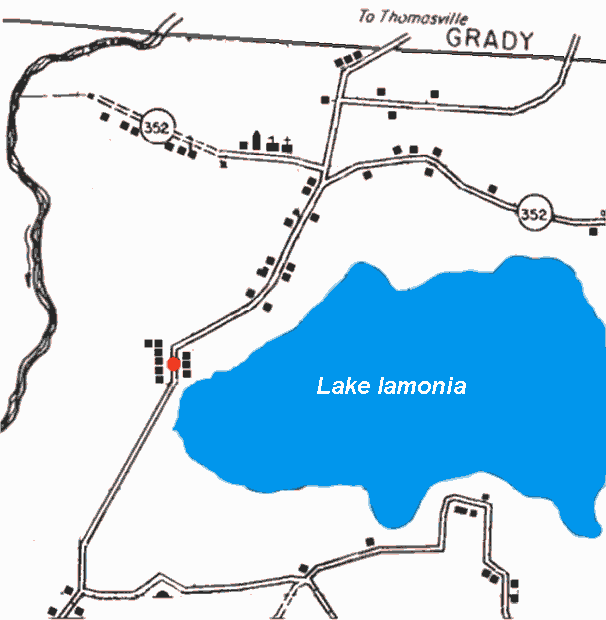
Location of the Meridian with homes, church, and school in 1940

Meridian is a small unincorporated community in northwestern Leon County, Florida, United States.

== Location ==
Meridian is located on the west side of Lake Iamonia on N. Meridian Road, 12 miles north of Tallahassee.

== History ==
=== Antebellum ===
Meridian started as the center and community gathering place for nearby antebellum cotton plantations of Burgesstown, the William A. Carr Plantation, Bannerman Plantation, the James A. Kirksey Plantation, and the G.W. Holland Plantation.

=== 20th Century ===
In 1940, Meridian consisted of 20 homes in the immediate area and 20 more homes, a church, and school in the outlying area north of Meridian on N. Meridian Road. A saw mill was located south and east of Meridian.

Today, Meridian is still a community of several large homes and estates.

== Political ==
Leon County Commissioners are elected in a nonpartisan election. For reference, however, their party registrations are listed.

Meridian Governmental Representation
Position	Name	Party
County Commission At-Large	Nick Maddox	Democratic
County Commission At-Large	Carolyn Cummings	Democratic
Commissioner Dist. 3	Rick Minor	Democratic
Commissioner Dist. 4	Brian Welch	Democratic
U.S. House	Neal Dunn	Republican
Florida House	Allison Tant	Democratic
Florida Senate	Corey Simon	Republican
