= Ochlockonee, Florida =

Unincorporated community in Florida, U.S.

- Unincorporated community
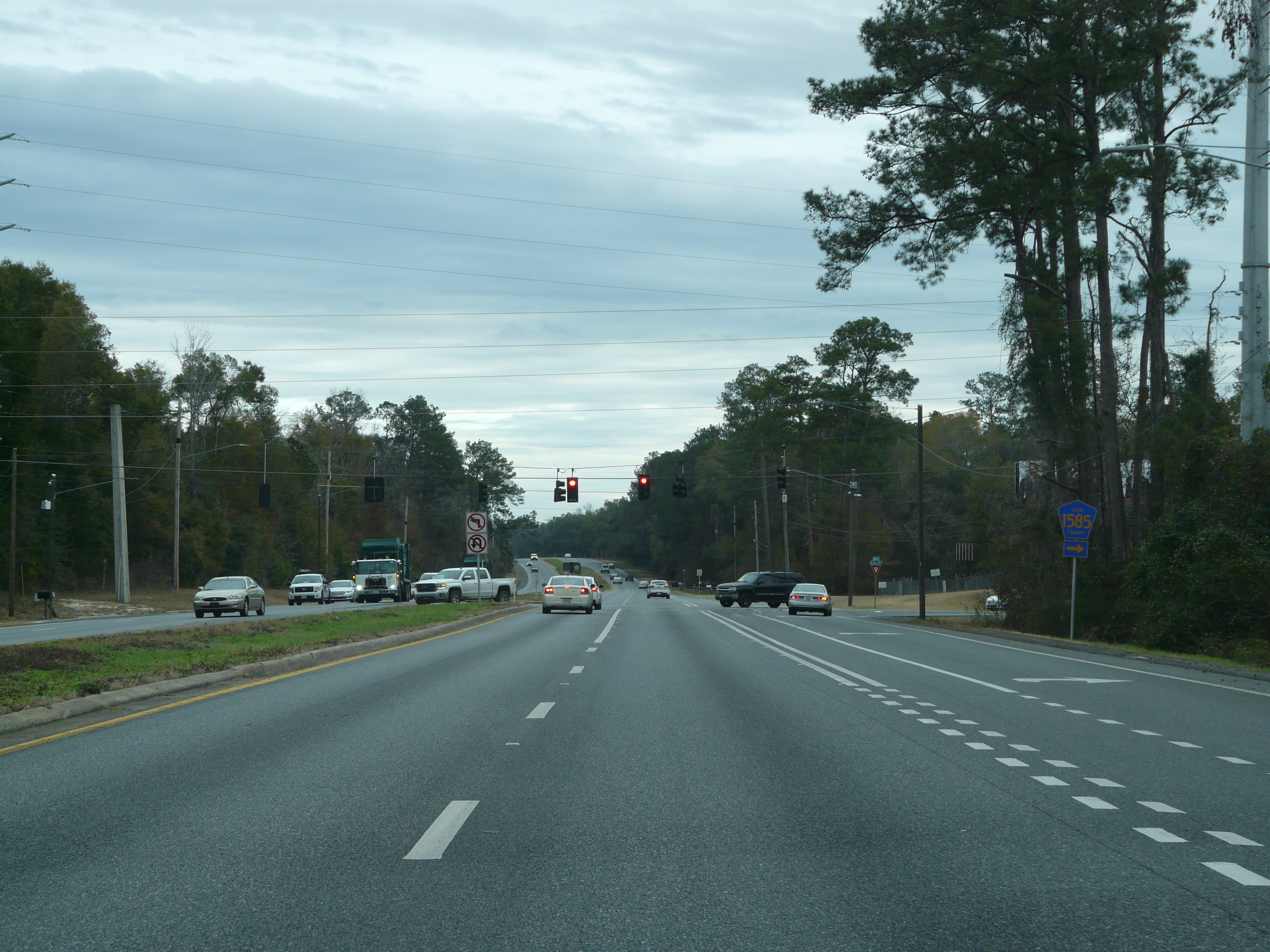
- US-90 at Geddie Road

- Location within Florida Location within the United States
- Coordinates: 30°28′21″N 84°24′25″W
- Country: United States
- State: Florida
- County: Leon
- Elevation: 95 ft (29 m)
- Time zone: UTC-5 (Eastern (EST))
  - Summer (DST): UTC-4 (EDT)
- Zip code: 32304
- Area codes: 850, 448
- GNIS feature ID: 306143

Ochlockonee is an unincorporated community in western Leon County, Florida, United States, located at U.S. Route 90 and County Road 260 (Geddie Road) and at the Ochlockonee River, west of Tallahassee by three miles (4.8 km).

The community includes the neighborhoods around Chigger Lane, Houston Road, and Sassy Tree Lane. Ochlockonee is bordered on the north and south by the Lake Talquin Recreation Area.

== Government ==
Ochlockonee is included in Leon County Commission District 2.

U.S. Postal Code: 32304

== History ==
The community name derives from Muskogean for "yellow water."
