= Orchard Pond Parkway =

Road in Florida, United States

County Road 0344
- Orchard Pond Parkway
- Orchard Pond Parkway highlighted in red

Route information
- Maintained by Leon County Public Works Department
- Length: 5.2 mi (8.4 km)
- Existed: 2016–present

Major junctions
- West end: CR 0361 northwest of Tallahassee
- East end: CR 155 / CR 0342 north of Tallahassee

Location
- Country: United States
- State: Florida
- County: Leon

Highway system
- County roads in Florida; County roads in Leon County

The Orchard Pond Parkway, also known as County Road 0344 (CR 0344), is a controlled-access toll road, covering a distance of 5.2 miles (8.4 km) in the northern part of Leon County, Florida, acting as a partial bypass of Tallahassee and providing the only connection north of Interstate 10 between the northeastern and northwestern parts of the city. Replacing a dirt road that formerly covered the route, it opened in 2016; using open road tolling, it is considered to be the first privately built toll road to be constructed in the state of Florida. A multi-use trail parallels the road along the old dirt roadway.

== Route description ==
The Orchard Pond Parkway covers a distance of roughly five point two miles (8.4 km), and is a two-lane freeway, with two, undivided 12-foot (3.7 m) traffic lanes. The road follows an east–west path in northern and northwestern Leon County, Florida, in the rural–urban fringe area of Tallahassee, the state's capital city.

Connecting Meridian Road (CR 155) with Old Bainbridge Road (CR 0361), the eastern end of Orchard Pond Parkway routes into Bannerman Road (CR 0342), providing a connection to U.S. Route 319 (US 319) and providing a complete bypass route across the northern quadrant of Tallahassee. The speed limit on the route is set at 55 miles per hour (89 km/h).

The parkway was built partially along the route of, and replaced, Orchard Pond Road, an unimproved dirt road which had, prior to the construction of the parkway, been the only route allowing access across the northwestern quadrant of Tallahassee north of Interstate 10 (I-10). It had long been considered an especially hazardous route due to its condition, with a rough surface, narrow lanes, and tight bends; drivers following the route often found it taking 30 minutes or more to traverse the short distance, which would become muddy during heavy rains and washboarded during dry spells. The road also was an environmental hazard, with mud, silt, and debris flowing off of the roadway into lakes along its route during major rainstorms.

== History ==
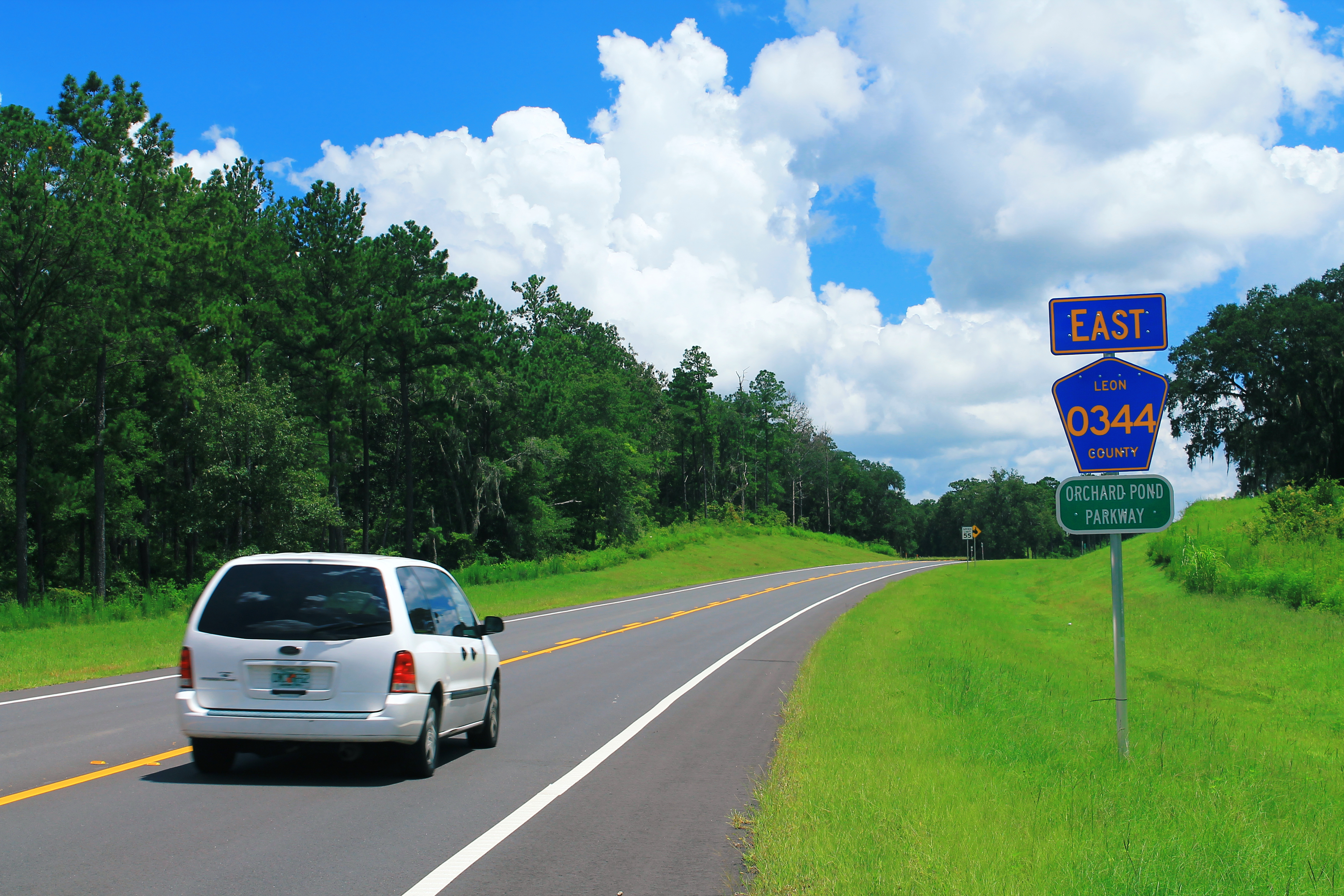
Orchard Pond Parkway route marker

The first privately built toll road to be constructed in Florida, and the first toll road built in Leon County, Florida, construction of the Orchard Pond Parkway was begun in January 2015. The projected completion date was January 2016, although the project was delayed by several months. Constructed by Jeff Phipps, owner of Orchard Pond Plantation, the route was designed to have a minimal environmental impact, along with multiple wildlife crossings being installed. Upon completion the road was handed over to the Leon County government, to be leased back to the constructor over a 99-year term with the lease fees acting as payment for the route. The cost of the project was approximately $17 million, $13.5 million of which was provided as a loan from the Florida Department of Transportation Infrastructure Bank; 45,000 short tons (41,000 t) of recycled concrete was used during the construction of the roadway.

The Orchard Pond Parkway opened on April 18, 2016; as an introductory measure to encourage local drivers to familiarize themselves with the route, tolls were not collected until May 1. Following that date, open road tolling using the Florida Department of Transportation's SunPass system was instituted, with toll-by-plate as an option for drivers without a SunPass transponder. Traffic volumes for the road were projected to rise to 2000 cars per day; the highest recorded daily traffic count in the first ten months of operation, following the imposition of tolls, was 1800 cars.

The route is considered to be an example for potential future projects to follow, being described as the first step in "a new Capital Circle", providing a bypass for truck traffic to the north of Tallahassee to match the existing partial beltway to the south of the city, reducing traffic congestion and improving safety in the city's busy downtown area, through which a truck route currently passes.

== Recreational trail ==
Following the opening of the Orchard Pond Parkway, the old dirt road route was converted into a recreational multi-use trail; the 3.5-mile (5.6 km) Orchard Pond Road Trail opened in August 2016. Two entrances, one on the parkway itself and another accessed from Old Bainbridge Road, provide access to the trail for equestrian, cycling, and hiking traffic. In 2019, funding for phase 2 of the trail was vetoed by Florida governor Ron DeSantis.

== Exit list ==
The entire route is in Tallahassee, Leon County.

mi	km	Destinations	Notes
0.0	0.0	CR 0361 (Old Bainbridge Road)	Western terminus; at-grade intersection
4.5	7.2	Toll Gantry	
5.2	8.4	CR 155 (Meridian Road) / CR 0342 east (Bannerman Road)	Eastern terminus; at-grade intersection
1.000 mi = 1.609 km; 1.000 km = 0.621 mi: Electronic toll collection
