= Waukeenah, Florida =

- Census-designated place
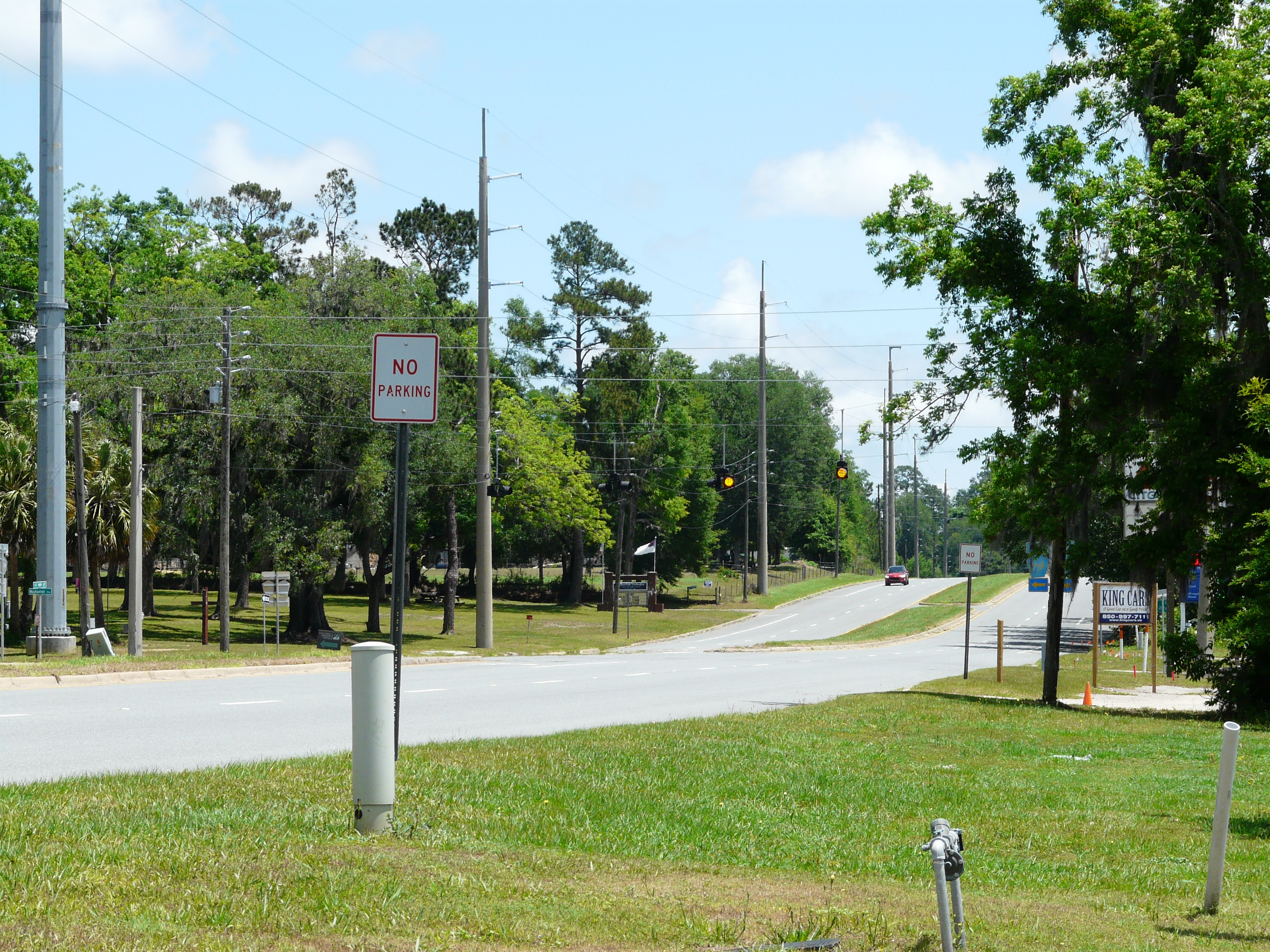
- Intersection of Capps and Waukeenah highways

- Location within Florida Location within the United States
- Coordinates: 30°24′07″N 83°57′36″W
- Country: United States
- State: Florida
- County: Jefferson

Area
  - Total: 3.22 sq mi (8.35 km^{2})
  - Land: 3.16 sq mi (8.18 km^{2})
  - Water: 0.066 sq mi (0.17 km^{2})
- Elevation: 213 ft (65 m)

Population (2020)
  - Total: 259
  - Density: 82.0/sq mi (31.67/km^{2})
- Time zone: UTC-5 (Eastern (EST))
  - Summer (DST): UTC-4 (EDT)
- ZIP code: 32344
- Area code: 850
- FIPS code: 12-75425
- GNIS feature ID: 2628538

Waukeenah is an unincorporated community and census-designated place (CDP) in Jefferson County, Florida, United States. As of the 2020 census, the population was 259, down from 272 at the 2010 census. It is part of the Tallahassee metropolitan area.

== Geography ==
Waukeenah is located near the intersection of US 27/State Road 20 and County Road 259. It is 11 miles (18 km) southwest of Monticello, the Jefferson county seat, and 20 miles (32 km) east of Tallahassee, the state capital.

Waukeenah was once a resting point for travelers using the Old St. Augustine road, which started in St. Augustine and went to Pensacola, Florida.

== Nomenclature ==
John G. Gamble's plantation was named Joaquina in honor of a Spanish descent lady who lived in Pensacola. The post office established at the plantation was moved to the crossing of Tallahassee and St. Augustine Roads in 1841. First called Marion Cross Road (Marion Post Office) until 1850 when the settlement there was once again named Joaquina, but this time the spelling was Anglicized into Waukeenah.

== Census ==
According to the U.S. Census Bureau, the Waukeenah CDP has a total area of 3.2 square miles (8.4 km^{2}), of which 3.2 square miles (8.2 km^{2}) are land and 0.1 square miles (0.2 km^{2}), or 2.04%, are water.

== Education ==
Jefferson County Schools operates public schools, including Jefferson County Middle / High School.

Waukeenah Academy was a school in the area. Samuel Pasco was its principal. It did not survive the Civil War era.

== Demographics ==
Historical population
Census	Pop.	Note	%±
2010	272		—
2020	259		−4.8%
U.S. Decennial Census; 1990 2000

Waukeenah was first listed as a census designated place in the 2010 U.S. census.
