= Wacissa, Florida =

- Census-designated place
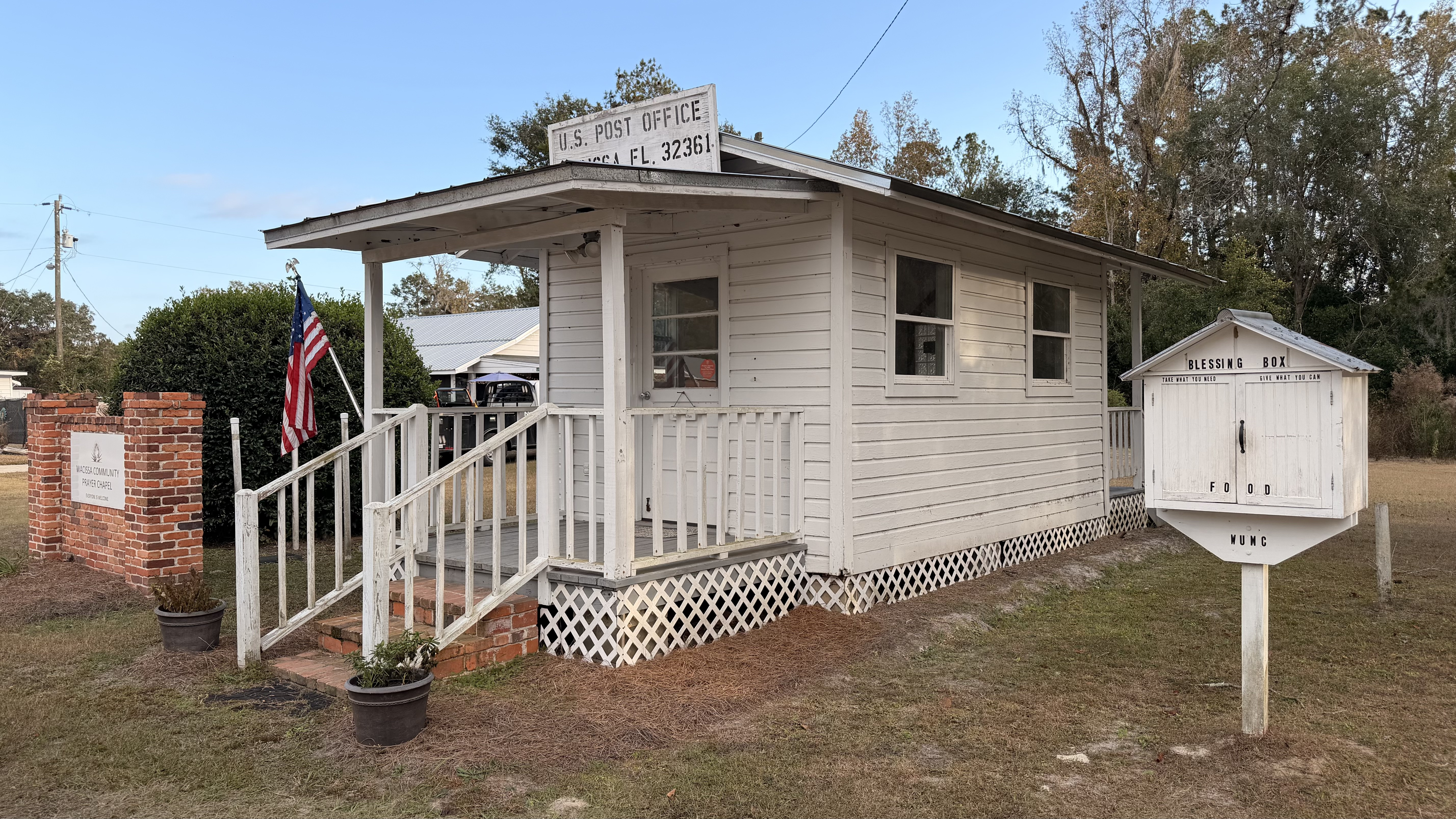
- Old Wacissa Post Office

- Location within Florida Location within the United States
- Coordinates: 30°21′50″N 84°00′02″W
- Country: United States
- State: Florida
- County: Jefferson

Area
  - Total: 4.22 sq mi (10.93 km^{2})
  - Land: 4.20 sq mi (10.87 km^{2})
  - Water: 0.023 sq mi (0.06 km^{2})
- Elevation: 33 ft (10 m)

Population (2020)
  - Total: 362
  - Density: 86/sq mi (33.3/km^{2})
- Time zone: UTC-5 (Eastern (EST))
  - Summer (DST): UTC-4 (EDT)
- ZIP code: 32361
- Area code: 850
- FIPS code: 12-74700
- GNIS feature ID: 2628536

Wacissa is a small unincorporated community and census-designated place (CDP) in Jefferson County, Florida, United States. As of the 2020 census, the population was 362, down from 386 at the 2010 census. It is part of the Tallahassee metropolitan area. It shares its name with the Wacissa River, the headwaters of which are about one mile to the south.

== Geography ==
Wacissa is in western Jefferson County, 16 miles (26 km) southwest of Monticello, the county seat, and 20 miles (32 km) southeast of Tallahassee, the state capital. Florida State Road 59 runs through the community, leading north 4 miles (6 km) to U.S. Route 27 and south 14 miles (23 km) to U.S. Route 98.

According to the U.S. Census Bureau, the Wacissa CDP has a total area of 4.2 square miles (10.9 km^{2}), of which 0.02 square miles (0.06 km^{2}), or 0.53%, are water.

== Demographics ==
Historical population
Census	Pop.	Note	%±
2010	386		—
2020	362		−6.2%
U.S. Decennial Census; 1990 2000

Wacissa was first listed as a census designated place in the 2010 U.S. census.

=== 2020 census ===
Wacissa CDP, Florida – Racial and ethnic composition Note: the US Census treats Hispanic/Latino as an ethnic category. This table excludes Latinos from the racial categories and assigns them to a separate category. Hispanics/Latinos may be of any race.
Race / Ethnicity (NH = Non-Hispanic)	Pop 2010	Pop 2020	% 2010	% 2020
White alone (NH)	299	309	77.46%	85.36%
Black or African American alone (NH)	71	30	18.39%	8.29%
Native American or Alaska Native alone (NH)	0	3	0.00%	0.83%
Asian alone (NH)	0	0	0.00%	0.00%
Pacific Islander alone (NH)	0	0	0.00%	0.00%
Some Other Race alone (NH)	0	0	0.00%	0.00%
Mixed Race/Multi-Racial (NH)	7	15	1.81%	4.14%
Hispanic or Latino (any race)	9	5	2.33%	1.38%
Total	386	362	100.00%	100.00%

As of the 2010 census, Wacissa had a population of 386 and 197 housing units.

The Wacissa Census Designated Place (CDP) had a population of 418 and 215 housing units as of July 1, 2021.

== Cemeteries ==
- Bethpage Cemetery
- Broomsage Cemetery
- Walker Cemetery
- Story Cemetery

== Churches ==
- Bethpage Church
- Wacissa Pentecostal Holiness Church
- United Methodist Church
- Welaunee Church
- Union Hill AME Church

== Education ==
Jefferson County Schools operates public schools, including Jefferson County Middle / High School.
