= Wadesboro, Florida =

Unincorporated community in Florida, U.S.

Coordinates: 30°30′19″N 84°03′57″W

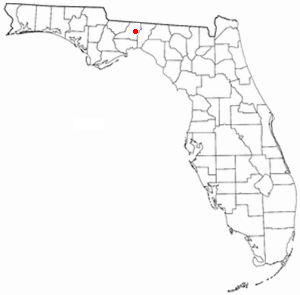
Location of Wadesboro.

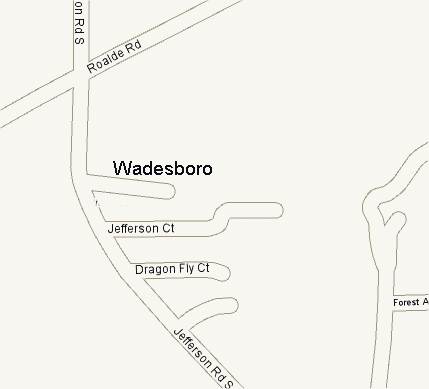
Location of Wadesboro.

Wadesboro is an unincorporated community in eastern Leon County, Florida, United States.

== Location ==
In broad geographic terms, Wadesboro is located between Highway 90 on the north, Interstate 10 on the south, Baum Road on the west, and State Road 59 on the east. More precisely, Wadesboro encompasses the neighborhoods of Wadesboro Road, Roalde Road, Holey Road, Jefferson Road South, Jefferson Court, Dragon Fly Court, Hickory Wind Road, and others in that locale.

== History ==
In 1909, Wadesboro was a stop between Miccosukee and Lloyd on the 47 mile stretch of the Florida Central Railroad on its way south from Thomasville, Georgia to Fanlew, Florida.

In 1940, Wadesboro had a train station on the Atlantic Coast Line Railroad. Wadesboro also had a sawmill, school, four businesses and several homes.

Wadesboro today no longer has a school or sawmill but still has several homes and is continuing to grow. Wadesboro is a part of the Leon County School District and is zoned for Chaires Elementary School, Swift Creek Middle School and Lincoln High School. Wadesboro is four miles from some schools, gas stations and Interstate 10, and six miles from several stores and shopping centers.
