= Chaires, Florida =

Unincorporated community in Florida, U.S.

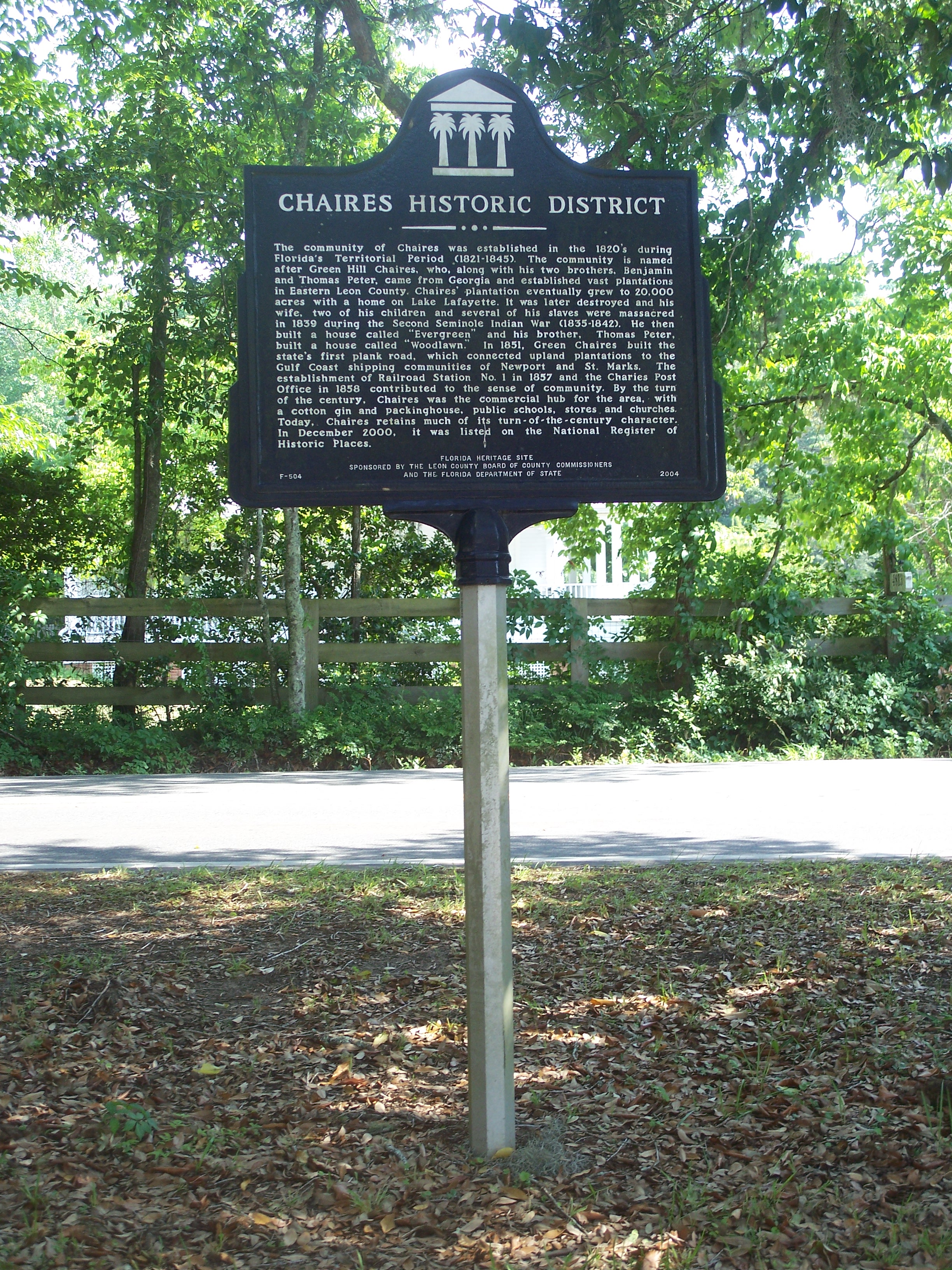
Historic District sign

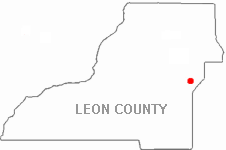
Location of Chaires

Chaires (pronounced as /tʃaɪrɛs/) is an unincorporated community and census-designated place (CDP) located just east of Tallahassee in Leon County, Florida, United States. The population was 308 at the 2020 census. It is part of the Tallahassee, Florida Metropolitan Statistical Area. It is located near the intersection of Chaires Cross Road and Capitola Road, northeast of Lake Lafayette and the Edwards Wildlife Area. The ZIP Code for Chaires is 32317.

== Geography ==
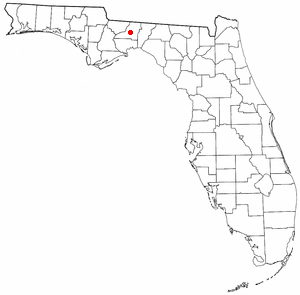
Location of Chaires, Florida

Chaires is located at 30°26′10″N 84°07′03″W.

== History ==
Chaires was named after one of its earliest founders, Green Hill Chaires, one of three brothers who moved to Florida and helped settle Tallahassee and the surrounding areas. Green Hill and his brothers, Benjamin and Thomas Peter Chaires, all created thriving plantations in the southeastern section of Leon County. They settled down, became wealthy planters and were influential, to varying degrees, on the politics of North Florida. Although the plantations are gone, their legacies still exist today in the names, families, pride and history of the area that is now known as Chaires.

Green Hill originally built a cotton plantation on the edge of Lake Lafayette, Florida. There he began to develop into a wealthy and, therefore, influential Southern planter. In 1838, however, an Indian raid left several of his family members, including his wife, dead and his home burned to the ground. To rebuild, Green Hill moved further east. He built a new plantation, called Evergreen Hills, in the area that is currently known as Chaires. It was so named because Green Hill owned all of this land until he gave certain tracts of it to the building of the railroad and his descendants.

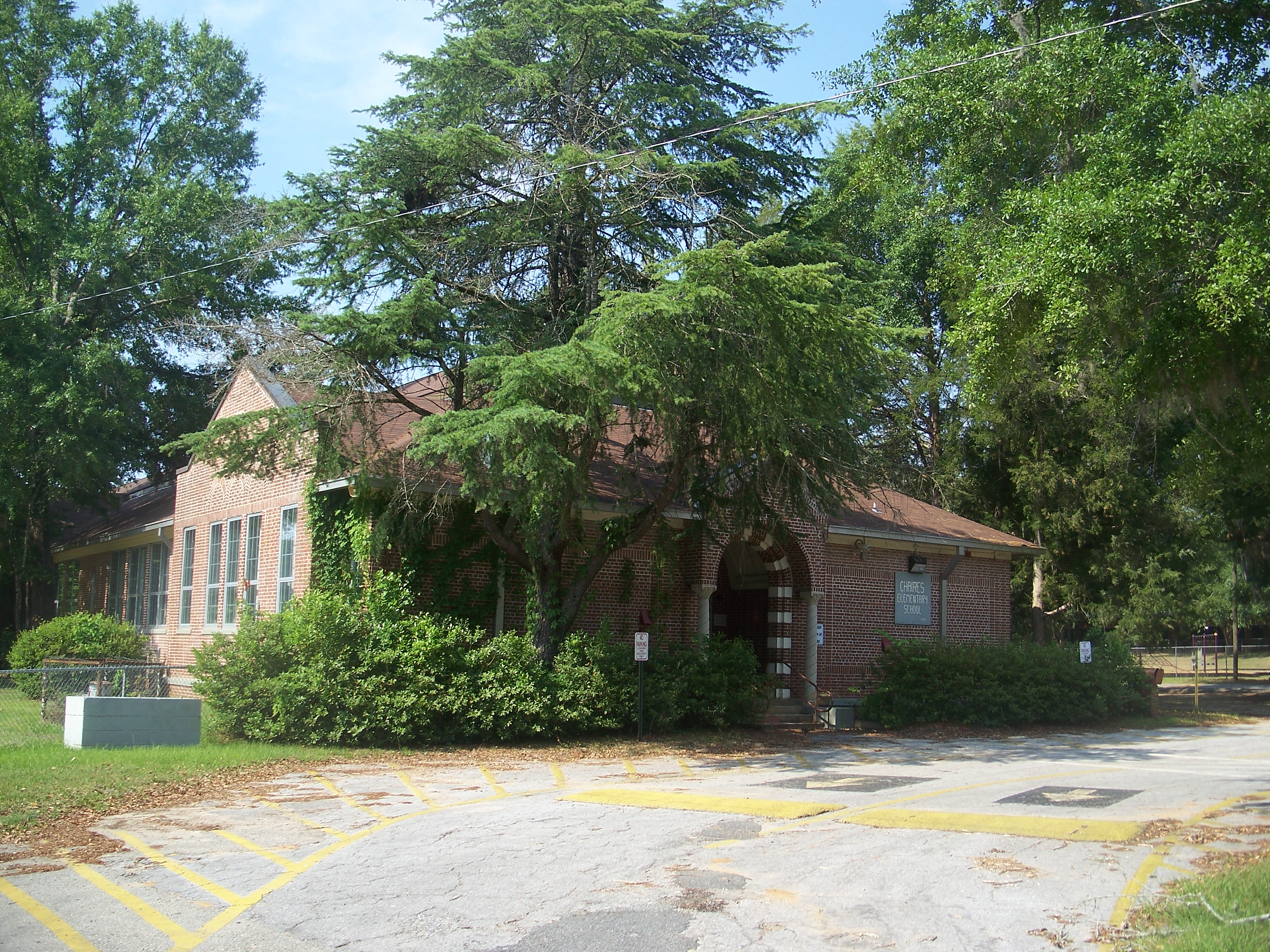
Old Chaires Elementary School

The Chaires Massacre occurred in 1839, on a Saturday in July after dark. Interrupted by the attack, the family fled their home. Hannah Averitt Chaires, wife of Green Hill, and two children perished in the attack. Green Hill Chaires sought help from a small force of men in Tallahassee called the "minute men". Although an attempt was made to track the Indians, Capt. Hugh Fisher and his "minute men"' were unable to pursue the trail due to a heavy rainstorm. According to this article, the reason for the attack is unknown. Perhaps it was the eastern location of the Chaires farm, and its distance from Old St. Augustine Road, which was the main thoroughfare at the time. (Florida Clipping Service, Tampa, Florida, Tallahassee Democrat, November, 1946)

== Demographics ==
Chaires first appeared as a census designated place in the 2020 U.S. census.

== Education ==
=== Chaires School ===
One of the historical gems of Chaires is the Chaires School. Chaires became more settled and the land more open, the community of Chaires began to grow. In the Chaires area, Barrow Hill school and Chaires school provided education for the children who lived in eastern Leon County. Actually in the early days of Leon County, children from Tallahassee also attended school in Chaires. Boarding with families in Chaires during the week, and going home on the train for the weekend. Chaires school is now known as Chaires Elementary School home to around 550 students for grades pre-kindergarten to 5th grade. Chaires is also an A+ schools and has been since at least 2000. Chaires is also a place of employment for around 40 teachers. Chaires now sits in its second location since the school house at 4774 Chaires Cross Road, Tallahassee Fl 32317.

== Public safety ==
Fire and rescue services are provided to the community by the Chaires-Capitola Volunteer Fire Department (CCVFD), who share Tallahassee Fire Department Station 12 through a mutual-aid agreement with the City of Tallahassee. Station 12A is auxiliary, used for equipment storage, and Substation 30 is unmanned.

== Places of interest ==
In the early 2000s, Leon County developed Chaires-Capitola Community Park, a new community park adjacent to Chaires Elementary School. The park has four lighted tennis courts, two basketball courts and two standard Little League Baseball diamonds. The Dorothy Cooper Spence Community Center was also built to serve the citizens of the community and named after Dorothy Cooper Spence, a community activist. The community center and park have become the focal point of the larger Chaires community.

== Unknown boundaries or population ==
Since Chaires is not a formal municipality, but rather a community by association, its boundaries are undefined. However, with the growing sprawl of the city of Tallahassee, more and more people in unincorporated eastern Leon County often distinguish themselves by associating with the "Chaires" community name. This sometimes includes neighborhoods south of Apalachee Parkway, along Williams, Louvinia, and WW Kelley Roads.

== Political ==
Chaires Governmental Representation
Position	Name	Party
County Commission At-Large	Nick Maddox	Democrat
County Commission At-Large	Mary Ann Lindley	Democrat
Commissioner Dist. 5	Kristen Dozier	Democrat
U.S. House	Gwen Graham	Democrat
Florida House	Michelle Rehwinkel Vasilinda

== Residents ==
- Laura Dixie, hospital worker and civil rights organizer in Tallahassee
