= Florida State Road 59 =

State highway in Florida, United States

State Road 59

Route information
- Maintained by FDOT
- Length: 25.919 mi (41.713 km)

Major junctions
- South end: US 98 east of Newport
- US 27 north of Wacissa; I-10 north of Lloyd
- North end: US 90 / CR 142 north of Lloyd

Location
- Country: United States
- State: Florida
- Counties: Jefferson, Leon

Highway system
- Florida State Highway System; Interstate; US; State; Former; Pre‑1945; Toll; Scenic
← SR 57	→ SR 60

State Road 59 (SR 59) runs north to south through the eastern Florida Panhandle, with a northern terminus at US 90 near Lloyd, one major intersection at Interstate 10 at exit 217, and a southern terminus at US 98 in rural Jefferson County.

The route is extended at both ends by county roads; to the north through Leon County to the Georgia state line, where it becomes State Route 122 to Thomasville; and on the south via County Road 59, a former secondary state route, into the Saint Marks National Wildlife Refuge.

== Major intersections ==
County	Location	mi	km	Destinations	Notes
Jefferson		0.000	0.000	US 98 (SR 30) – Perry, Newport	
Jefferson	Wacissa	13.774	22.167	CR 259 (Waukeenah Highway / Tram Road) – Waukeenah	
Jefferson		17.643	28.394	US 27 (SR 20) – Tallahassee, Waukeenah, Capps	
Jefferson	Lloyd	22.738	36.593	CR 158 (Old Lloyd Road / Bond Street)	
Jefferson		23.43	37.71	I-10 (SR 8) – Tallahassee, Lake City	I-10 exit 217
Leon		25.919	41.713	US 90 (SR 10) / CR 142 east (Old Magnolia Road) – Letchworth-Love Mounds Archaeological State Park	
1.000 mi = 1.609 km; 1.000 km = 0.621 mi
