= Jefferson County, Florida =

County in Florida, United States

- County
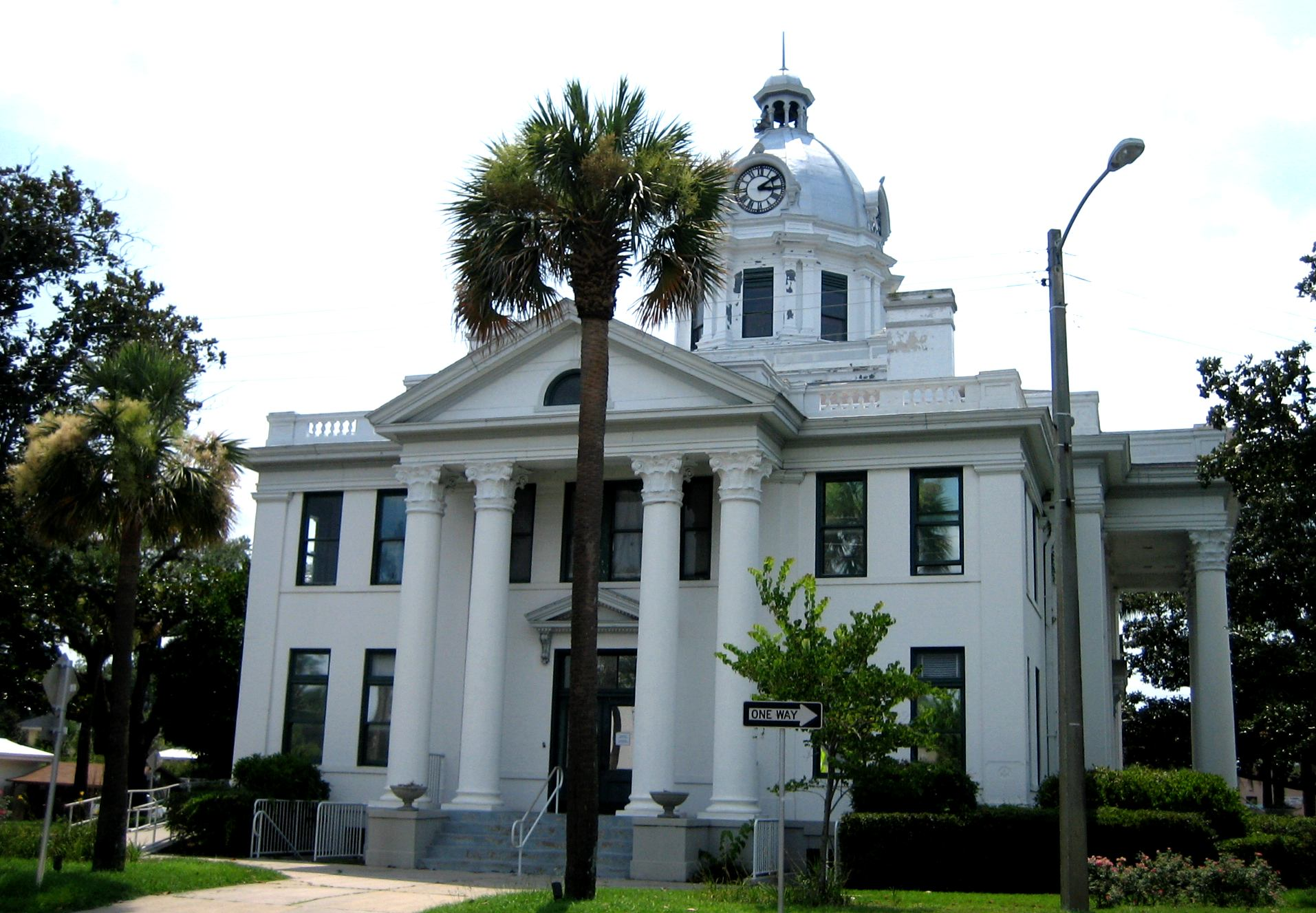
- Jefferson County Courthouse in Monticello

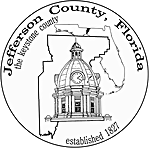
- Seal

- Location within the U.S. state of Florida
- Coordinates: 30°25′N 83°54′W
- Country: United States
- State: Florida
- Founded: January 20, 1827
- Named for: Thomas Jefferson
- Seat: Monticello
- Largest city: Monticello

Area
  - Total: 637 sq mi (1,650 km^{2})
  - Land: 598 sq mi (1,550 km^{2})
  - Water: 38 sq mi (98 km^{2}) 6.0%

Population (2020)
  - Total: 14,510
  - Estimate (2025): 16,007 ▲
  - Density: 24.3/sq mi (9.37/km^{2})
- Time zone: UTC−5 (Eastern)
  - Summer (DST): UTC−4 (EDT)
- Area code: 850
- Congressional district: 2nd
- Website: www.jeffersoncountyfl.gov

Jefferson County is a county located in the Big Bend region in the northern part of the U.S. state of Florida. As of the 2020 census, the population was 14,510. Its county seat is Monticello. Jefferson County is part of the Tallahassee, FL Metropolitan Statistical Area but is the 3rd most rural county in Florida. There are no traffic signals within the entire county. During the plantation era, Jefferson County was the wealthiest per-capita county in the Florida territory.

== History ==
In the mid to late 18th century, a group of Native Americans from Chiaha chiefdom settled in what is now Jefferson County. This group would eventually become an element of the Mikasuki speaking Seminole.

Jefferson County was created in 1827 from eastern Leon County. It was named for Thomas Jefferson, third president of the United States, who had died the year before the county's establishment.

=== Forts of Jefferson County ===
- Fort Roger Jones (1839), Aucilla (Ocilla Ferry), north of US 90.
- Fort Noel (1839–1842), south of Lamont on the Aucilla River, six miles (9.7 km) northwest of Fort Pleasant in Taylor County. Also known as Fort Number Three (M).
- Camp Carter (1838), near Waukeenah.
- Fort Welaunee (1838), a settlers' fort on the Welaunee Plantation near Wacissa. Fort Gamble (1839–1843) was later established here.
- Fort Aucilla (1843), two miles (3.2 km) south-east of Fort Gamble, southwest of Lamont, between the Aucilla and Wacissa Rivers. Also spelled Ocilla.
- Fort Wacissa (1838), a settlers' fort located south of Wacissa on the Wacissa River, west of Cabbage Grove.

=== American Civil War and Emancipation ===
In the two decades leading up to the American Civil War, cotton was the primary source of income in the county, with about seventeen percent of all Florida cotton being grown in Jefferson County. It was also the county with the second most large plantations (fifty-five plantations with thirty or more slaves) in Florida, behind only Leon County. In 1860, the county had a population of 9,876 with sixty-four percent being black. Following emancipation, the black population of Jefferson County continued to grow. By 1870 the population had risen to 13,968 with seventy-two percent black. To serve the relatively large black population in the county, the Freedmen's Bureau established an office in Monticello sometime around early 1866.

=== Post War ===
A fire destroyed most of the downtown wooden buildings in 1875, which were replaced by brick structures. Those that survived included the First Presbyterian Church and the Monticello News Building, the current home of Jefferson County’s newspapers. The Family Friend originated in February 1859. The Monticello News followed in 1909 and the Jefferson County Journal began publishing in July 2007.

Train service for passengers began in 1888, and tourists resulted in the St. Elmo hotel construction and the Perkins block which included a mercantile shop and general store on the first floor and a theater on the second. For two to six bits, guests could listen to live music, view a dramatic presentation or watch a circus. When passenger service ended in 1927, the tourism industry declined, as did the county population. The opera house slowed, then closed.

Jefferson Academy was established in 1852. The school building is referred to as the first built with bricks in Florida. Following the academy's closure, the building became Jefferson County High School. In 1890, Jefferson County operated 65 public schools including 30 white and 35 black which were segregated until 1965. The original Howard Academy was a black school that operated from 1936-1960 and is listed on the National Register of Historic Places.

=== Tung Oil ===
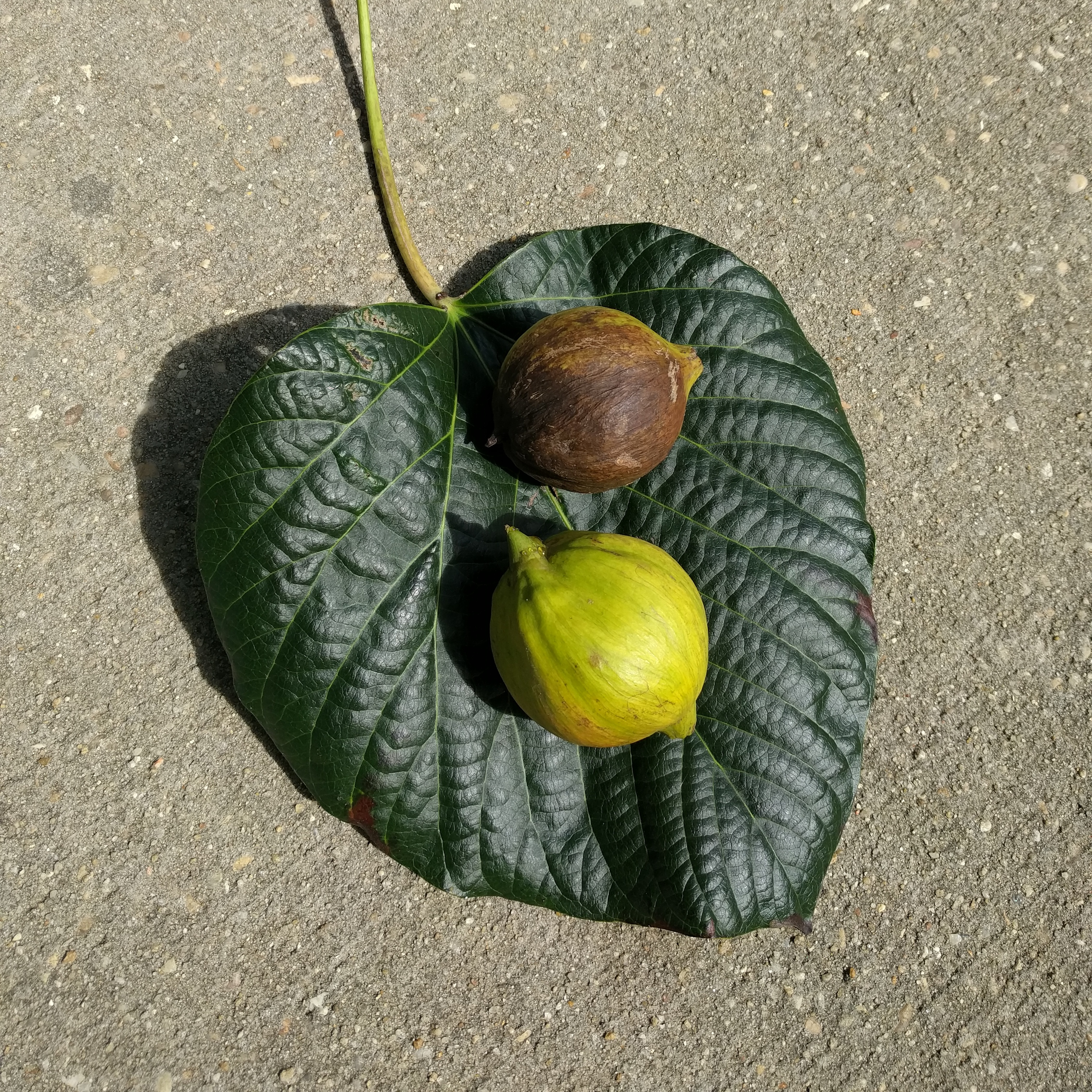
Tung tree leaf and fruit

Vernicia fordii (common name Tung Tree) is native to southern Asia but was introduced to US Gulf states in 1905. Tung oil is rendered from the seeds and used as a wood finish or an ingredient in varnish. During the 1950s, Jefferson County had more than 12,000 acres (4,900 ha) of tung trees and was the largest producer of tung oil in Florida and central to that industry in the state. Infrastructure for this major agricultural commodity included:

- Located in Capps, the Tungston Plantation was a 16,000 acres (6,500 ha) farm that functioned as a town with approximately 8,000 acres (3,200 ha) of tung trees, storage tanks, a processing facility and an airstrip.
- Several mills were dedicated to oil extraction. The General Tung mill was located in Lamont and the Jumpy Run mill was in Monticello.
- Homer Formby, a Florida antiques dealer, opened his first store in the Perkins Opera House, using the local tung oil to develop Formby's Furniture Refinisher among a line of furniture restoration products. Formby made millions and his business was eventually sold to Sherwin-Williams who discontinued it in 2022.

Freezes, hurricanes, synthetic chemical alternatives and foreign competition ended the tung oil industry in Florida between 1960 and the 1970s.

=== Dog racing ===
The Jefferson County Kennel Club (JCKC) was a greyhound racing venue established in 1958 and closed in 2014. It was the only dog track in north Florida between Jacksonville and Pensacola. The facility employed almost 300 local residents and made a significant contribution to the county's economy. A poker room was added in 2003 featuring Texas hold 'em and the track became a Racino. The cards became more profitable than dog racing, which ended in 2011.

== Geography ==
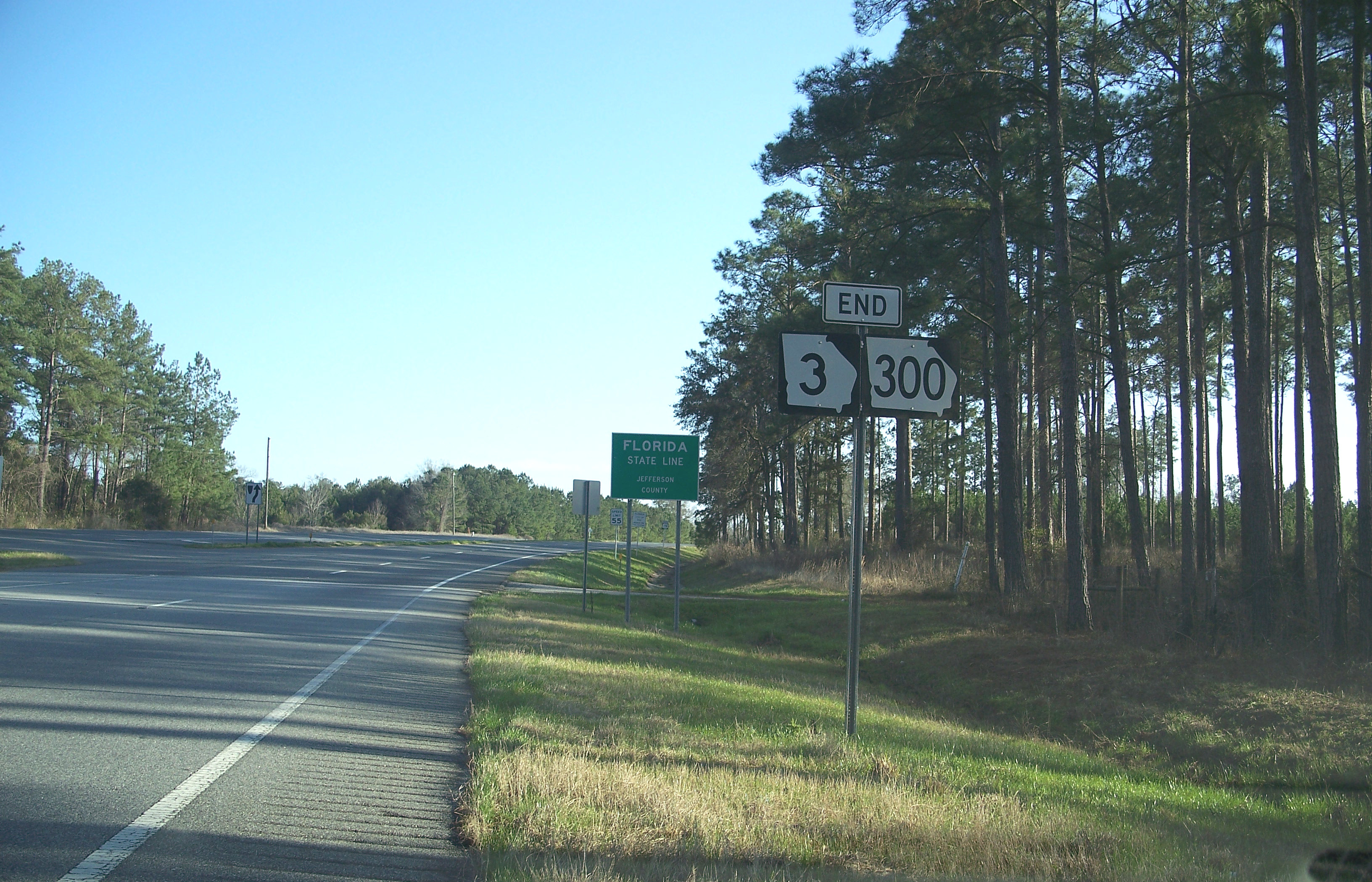
Entering Jefferson County on US 19 from Thomas County, Georgia

According to the U.S. Census Bureau, the county has a total area of 637 square miles (1,650 km^{2}), of which 598 square miles (1,550 km^{2}) is land and 38 square miles (98 km^{2}) (6.0%) is water.

Jefferson County is called the keystone county because it is the only county in Florida which borders both the state of Georgia and the Gulf of Mexico. It is also one of only five counties extending from the northern border of the state to the Gulf of Mexico. The other four are the four westernmost counties in Florida, which from west to east are Escambia, Santa Rosa, Okaloosa, and Walton counties, which all border Alabama.

The eastern border with Madison County is the Aucilla River. The start of the Wacissa River in the county's southeast is Wacissa Springs. The county extends across the Cody Scarp. The Woodville Karst Plain south of Monticello extends to the Gulf and contains numerous sinkholes and springs. The northwestern border with Leon County is the Red Hills Region of Tallahassee with rolling hills of red sand clay. Lake Miccosukee is a large, swampy prairie lake in northern part of the county.

=== Adjacent counties ===
- Thomas County, Georgia - north
- Brooks County, Georgia - northeast
- Madison County - east
- Taylor County - southeast
- Wakulla County - southwest
- Leon County - west

=== National protected area ===
- St. Marks National Wildlife Refuge (part)

=== Water Bodies ===
- Aucilla River
- Lake Miccosukee
- Wacissa River
- Gulf of Mexico

== Demographics ==
Historical population
Census	Pop.	Note	%±
1830	3,312		—
1840	5,713		72.5%
1850	7,718		35.1%
1860	9,876		28.0%
1870	13,398		35.7%
1880	16,065		19.9%
1890	15,757		−1.9%
1900	16,195		2.8%
1910	17,210		6.3%
1920	14,502		−15.7%
1930	13,408		−7.5%
1940	12,032		−10.3%
1950	10,413		−13.5%
1960	9,543		−8.4%
1970	8,778		−8.0%
1980	10,703		21.9%
1990	11,296		5.5%
2000	12,902		14.2%
2010	14,761		14.4%
2020	14,510		−1.7%
2025 (est.)	16,007	▲	10.3%
U.S. Decennial Census; 1790-1960 1900-1990; 1990-2000 2010-2019

=== Racial and ethnic composition ===
Jefferson County, Florida – Racial and ethnic composition Note: the US Census treats Hispanic/Latino as an ethnic category. This table excludes Latinos from the racial categories and assigns them to a separate category. Hispanics/Latinos may be of any race.
Race / Ethnicity (NH = Non-Hispanic)	Pop 1980	Pop 1990	Pop 2000	Pop 2010	Pop 2020	% 1980	% 1990	% 2000	% 2010	% 2020
White alone (NH)	5,533	6,233	7,522	8,668	8,720	51.70%	55.18%	58.30%	58.72%	60.10%
Black or African American alone (NH)	5,069	4,883	4,903	5,293	4,600	47.36%	43.23%	38.00%	35.86%	31.70%
Native American or Alaska Native alone (NH)	7	17	40	33	36	0.07%	0.15%	0.31%	0.22%	0.25%
Asian alone (NH)	11	27	37	49	34	0.10%	0.24%	0.29%	0.33%	0.23%
Native Hawaiian or Pacific Islander alone (NH)	x	x	4	4	3	x	x	0.03%	0.03%	0.02%
Other race alone (NH)	11	6	4	9	54	0.10%	0.05%	0.03%	0.06%	0.37%
Mixed race or Multiracial (NH)	x	x	102	159	405	x	x	0.79%	1.08%	2.79%
Hispanic or Latino (any race)	72	130	290	546	658	0.67%	1.15%	2.25%	3.70%	4.53%
Total	10,703	11,296	12,902	14,761	14,510	100.00%	100.00%	100.00%	100.00%	100.00%

A map of racial demographics in Jefferson County, Florida by Census tract. Legend: Non-Hispanic White 60–70% 70–80% Black or African American 50–60%

=== 2020 census ===
As of the 2020 census, Jefferson County had a population of 14,510, 5,816 households, and 3,762 families; the population density was 24.3 per square mile (9.4/km^{2}) and there were 6,690 housing units at an average density of 11.2 per square mile (4.3/km^{2}).

16.9% of the population was under the age of 18, 6.1% from 18 to 24, 20.9% from 25 to 44, 31.3% from 45 to 64, and 24.7% who were 65 years of age or older. The median age was 49.8 years. For every 100 females, there were 106.5 males, and for every 100 females ages 18 and older, there were 106.7 males.

The racial makeup of the county was 61.4% White, 31.8% Black or African American, 0.3% American Indian and Alaska Native, 0.2% Asian, <0.1% Native Hawaiian and Pacific Islander, 2.2% from some other race, and 4.1% from two or more races. Hispanic or Latino residents of any race comprised 4.5% of the population.

Of the 5,816 households, 23.6% had children under the age of 18 living in them, 46.2% were married-couple households, 20.0% were households with a male householder and no spouse or partner present, and 29.1% were households with a female householder and no spouse or partner present. About 30.2% of all households were made up of individuals and 15.3% had someone living alone who was 65 years of age or older. The average household size was 2.2 and the average family size was 2.7. The percent of those with a bachelor’s degree or higher was estimated to be 18.2% of the population.

There were 6,690 housing units, of which 13.1% were vacant. Among occupied housing units, 77.2% were owner-occupied and 22.8% were renter-occupied. The homeowner vacancy rate was 1.6% and the rental vacancy rate was 4.7%.

<0.1% of residents lived in urban areas, while 100.0% lived in rural areas.

The 2016–2020 5-year American Community Survey estimates show that the median household income was $49,081 (with a margin of error of +/- $7,142). The median family income was $62,571 (+/- $4,655). Males had a median income of $36,603 (+/- $4,356) versus $31,473 (+/- $3,015) for females. The median income for those above 16 years old was $32,454 (+/- $5,086). Approximately, 11.8% of families and 17.0% of the population were below the poverty line, including 27.8% of those under the age of 18 and 7.9% of those ages 65 or over.

=== 2010 census ===
As of the census of 2010, there were 14,761 people, 5,646 households, and 3,798 families residing in the county. The population density was 25 people per square mile (9.7 people/km^{2}). There were 5,251 housing units at an average density of 9 per square mile (3.5/km^{2}). The racial makeup of the county was 60.4% White, 36.2% Black or African American, 0.30% Native American, 0.40% Asian, 0.0% Pacific Islander, 1.50% from other races, and 1.30% from two or more races. 3.70% of the population were Hispanic or Latino of any race.

There were 5,646 households, out of which 26.9% had individuals under the age of 18 living with them, 47.30% were married couples living together, 15.10% had a female householder with no husband present, and 32.70% were non-families. 28.1% of all households were made up of individuals, and 10.6% had someone living alone who was 65 years of age or older. The average household size was 2.38 and the average family size was 2.89.

In the county, the population was spread out, with 18.6% under the age of 18, 8.20% from 18 to 24, 25.0% from 25 to 44, 32.30% from 45 to 64, and 16.5% who were 65 years of age or older. The median age was 44.1 years. For every 100 females, there were 109.6 males. For every 100 females age 18 and over, there were 110.00 males age 18 and over.

=== 2000 census ===
The following income information is from the 2000 census. The median income for a household in the county was $32,998, and the median income for a family was $40,407. Males had a median income of $26,271 versus $25,748 for females. The per capita income for the county was $17,006. About 13.30% of families and 17.10% of the population were below the poverty line, including 21.70% of those under age 18 and 17.00% of those age 65 or over.

== Government and politics ==
Jefferson County, like most counties in the Florida Panhandle, historically voted for Democratic candidates. However, while most counties in the Panhandle started reliably voting for Republican candidates, Jefferson County has divided its support among Democratic and Republican candidates. From 2000 to 2012, while Democratic candidates for President won the county, the margin dwindled over time; in 2016, the county voted for Donald Trump, the first time that it had voted for a Republican presidential candidate since 1988. In 2020, Trump expanded his margin of victory. Jefferson County consistently backed Democratic candidates in statewide races, but in 2018, Ron DeSantis became the first Republican gubernatorial nominee to win Jefferson County since 1884. Donald Trump again increased his margin in 2024, winning the highest percentage of the vote for a Republican presidential candidate since Nixon in 1972.

Jefferson County Officials
Position	Incumbent	Next election
District 1 Commissioner	Jessica Gramling	2028
District 2 Commissioner	Gene Hall	2030
District 3 Commissioner	J. T. Surles	2028
District 4 Commissioner	Austin Hosford	2026
District 5 Commissioner	Benjamin "Ben" White	2028
Clerk of the Circuit Court	Cecil "Trey" Hightower	2028
Sheriff	Mac McNeill	2028
Property Appraiser	Angela C. Gray	2028
Tax Collector	Shanna Boutwell	2028
Supervisor of Elections	Michelle Milligan	2028
Superintendent of Schools	Jackie Pons	2028

United States presidential election results for Jefferson County, Florida
Year	Republican		Democratic		Third party(ies)	
Year	No.	%	No.	%	No.	%
1884	1,525	67.21%	744	32.79%	0	0.00%
1892	0	0.00%	1,533	100.00%	0	0.00%
1896	242	11.07%	1,909	87.29%	36	1.65%
1900	143	16.55%	711	82.29%	10	1.16%
1904	123	20.20%	471	77.34%	15	2.46%
1908	149	18.81%	565	71.34%	78	9.85%
1912	47	8.45%	459	82.55%	50	8.99%
1916	104	13.70%	646	85.11%	9	1.19%
1920	239	22.85%	754	72.08%	53	5.07%
1924	66	9.69%	566	83.11%	49	7.20%
1928	235	20.22%	919	79.09%	8	0.69%
1932	81	5.40%	1,418	94.60%	0	0.00%
1936	127	9.27%	1,243	90.73%	0	0.00%
1940	215	13.21%	1,412	86.79%	0	0.00%
1944	188	14.93%	1,071	85.07%	0	0.00%
1948	153	11.56%	700	52.91%	470	35.53%
1952	665	36.22%	1,171	63.78%	0	0.00%
1956	540	31.02%	1,201	68.98%	0	0.00%
1960	600	34.70%	1,129	65.30%	0	0.00%
1964	1,684	52.82%	1,504	47.18%	0	0.00%
1968	459	14.84%	1,066	34.48%	1,567	50.68%
1972	2,108	66.04%	1,049	32.86%	35	1.10%
1976	1,361	36.30%	2,310	61.62%	78	2.08%
1980	1,623	39.19%	2,367	57.16%	151	3.65%
1984	2,244	52.16%	2,057	47.81%	1	0.02%
1988	2,326	52.89%	2,055	46.73%	17	0.39%
1992	1,506	32.19%	2,271	48.55%	901	19.26%
1996	1,851	38.49%	2,544	52.90%	414	8.61%
2000	2,478	43.91%	3,041	53.89%	124	2.20%
2004	3,298	44.10%	4,135	55.30%	45	0.60%
2008	3,797	47.59%	4,088	51.24%	93	1.17%
2012	3,808	48.70%	3,945	50.45%	67	0.86%
2016	3,930	51.11%	3,541	46.05%	218	2.84%
2020	4,479	52.89%	3,897	46.02%	92	1.09%
2024	5,011	58.94%	3,429	40.33%	62	0.73%

== Education ==
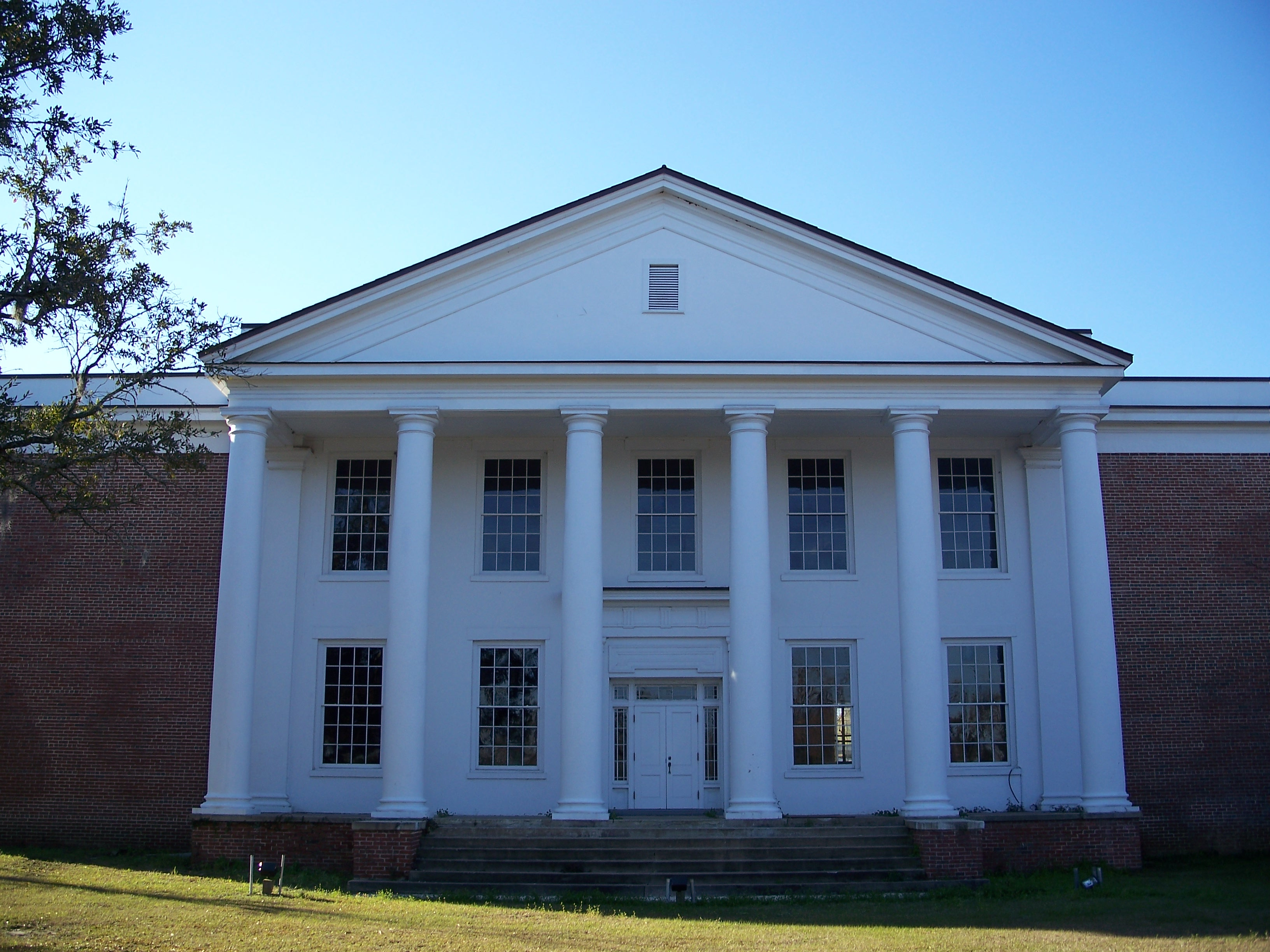
Former Jefferson County Middle / High School

Jefferson County Schools is the school district of the county. It operates public schools, including Jefferson County Middle / High School. Private Aucilla Christian Academy enrolls about half as many students as the Jefferson County public schools.

Jefferson County School Board
Position	Incumbent	Next election
District 1	Joy "Beth" Frisby	2028
District 2	Willie Ann Dickey	2026
District 3	Brenda Bentley Wirick	2030
District 4	Bill Brumfield	2028
District 5	Magdalen “Mags” Flynt	2030

== Library ==
Jefferson County's library is the R.J. Bailar Public Library, a member of the Wilderness Coast Public Libraries Cooperative. It is located in the building that once housed the old Jefferson High School library.

== Transportation ==
=== Railroads ===
The sole existing railroad line is a CSX line once owned by the Seaboard Air Line Railroad that was used by Amtrak's Sunset Limited until 2005, when the service was truncated to New Orleans by Hurricane Katrina. No Amtrak trains stopped anywhere in Jefferson County.

=== Major highways ===
- I-10 (Interstate 10 / SR 8) is the main west-to-east interstate highway in the county, and serves as the unofficial dividing line between northern and southern Jefferson County. It contains three interchanges within the county; the first being SR 59 in Lloyd (Exit 217), the second at US 19 in Drifton (Exit 225), and the third south of Aucilla at CR 257 (Exit 233). Beyond this point I-10 runs through Madison County.
- US 19 (SR 57) is the westernmost north-south US highway in the county. It enters from southwestern Madison County as the Georgia-Florida Parkway in a concurrency with US 27, then breaks away from US 27 in Capps to run straight north through Monticello where it encounters a traffic circle with US 90 around the historic Monticello Courthouse. North of the city it runs through the State of Georgia.
- US 27 (SR 20) is another north-south US highway in the county. It enters from Madison County in a concurrency with US 19, but unlike US 19 breaks away at Capps and runs west toward Tallahassee.
- SR 59 is the westernmost north–south highway in Jefferson County and is the only roadway connection between U.S. 90 (at its intersection in Leon County) to the southernmost east–west route through Jefferson County, U.S. Route 98.
- US 90 (SR 10) was the main west-to-east highway in the county, until it was surpassed by I-10. It enters the county from Leon County twice, the second time from a causeway over the southern end of Lake Miccosukee, and eventually enters Monticello in a traffic circle with US 19. East of the city, it curves southeast through rural Jefferson County, then passes north of Aucilla before crossing the Madison County Line at a bridge over the Aucilla River.
- US 98 (SR 30) is the southernmost east–west route running through the Conservation Areas of the Gulf of Mexico from Wakulla to Taylor Counties. The sole major intersection is with SR 59.
- US 221 (SR 55) is the easternmost US highway in the county, running south and north through the northeastern portion of Jefferson County, including Ashville before crossing the Georgia State Line.
- CR 259 is a west-east two-lane road known as the Waukeenah Highway in the county that runs from the Leon County line through Wacissa and terminates at US 19 south of the Monticello city limits.

== Communities ==
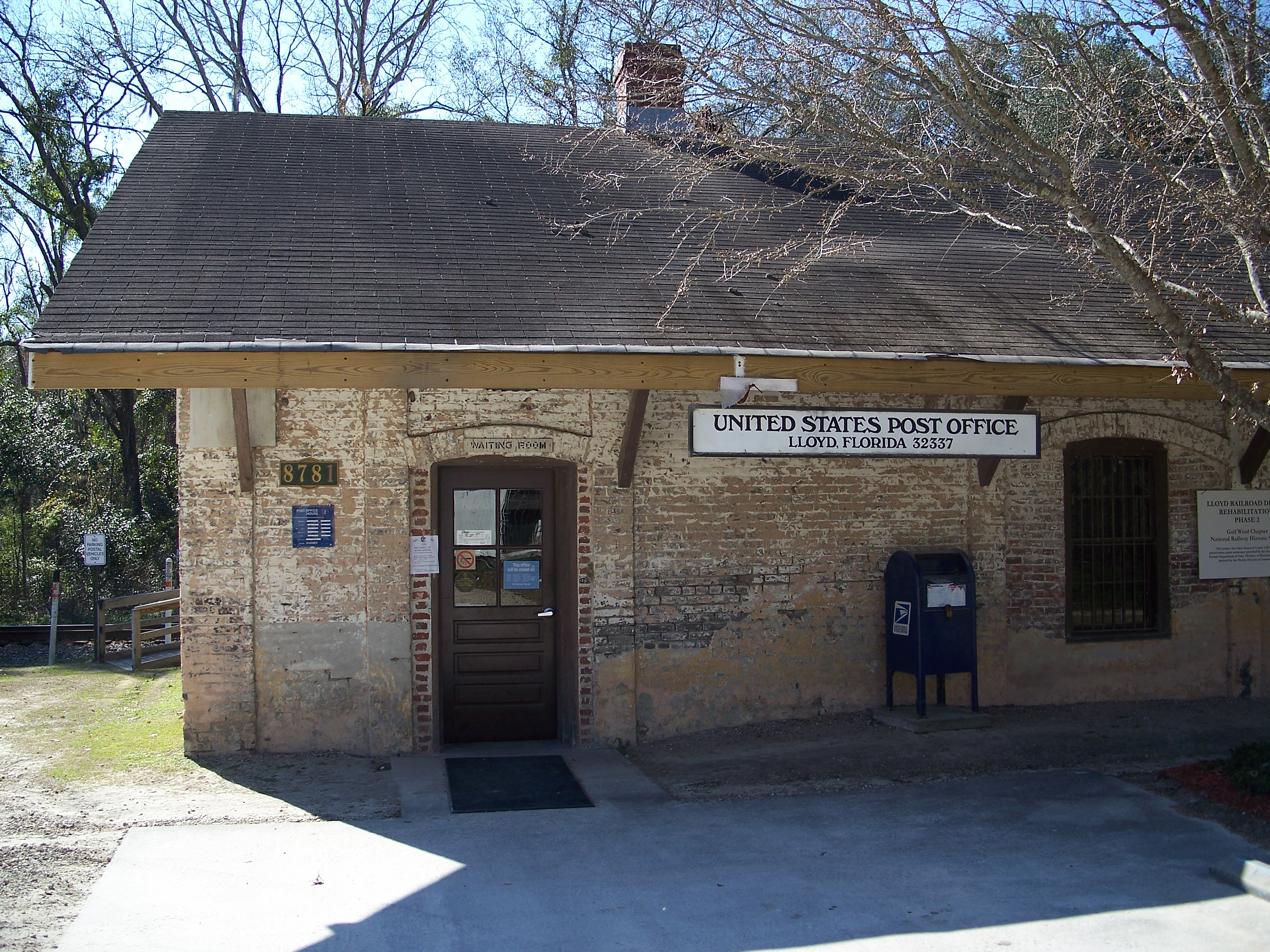
Old Lloyd Railroad Depot, now the area's post office

=== City ===
- Monticello

=== Census-designated places ===
- Aucilla
- Lamont
- Lloyd
- Wacissa
- Waukeenah

=== Other unincorporated communities ===
- Alma
- Ashville
- Capps
- Casa Blanco
- Cody
- Dills
- Drifton
- Fanlew
- Festus
- Fincher
- Jarrott
- Limestone
- Lois
- Montivilla
- Nash
- Thomas City

== See also ==
- National Register of Historic Places listings in Jefferson County, Florida
