= Iamonia, Florida =

Unincorporated community in Florida, U.S.

Coordinates: 30°40′06″N 84°09′49″W

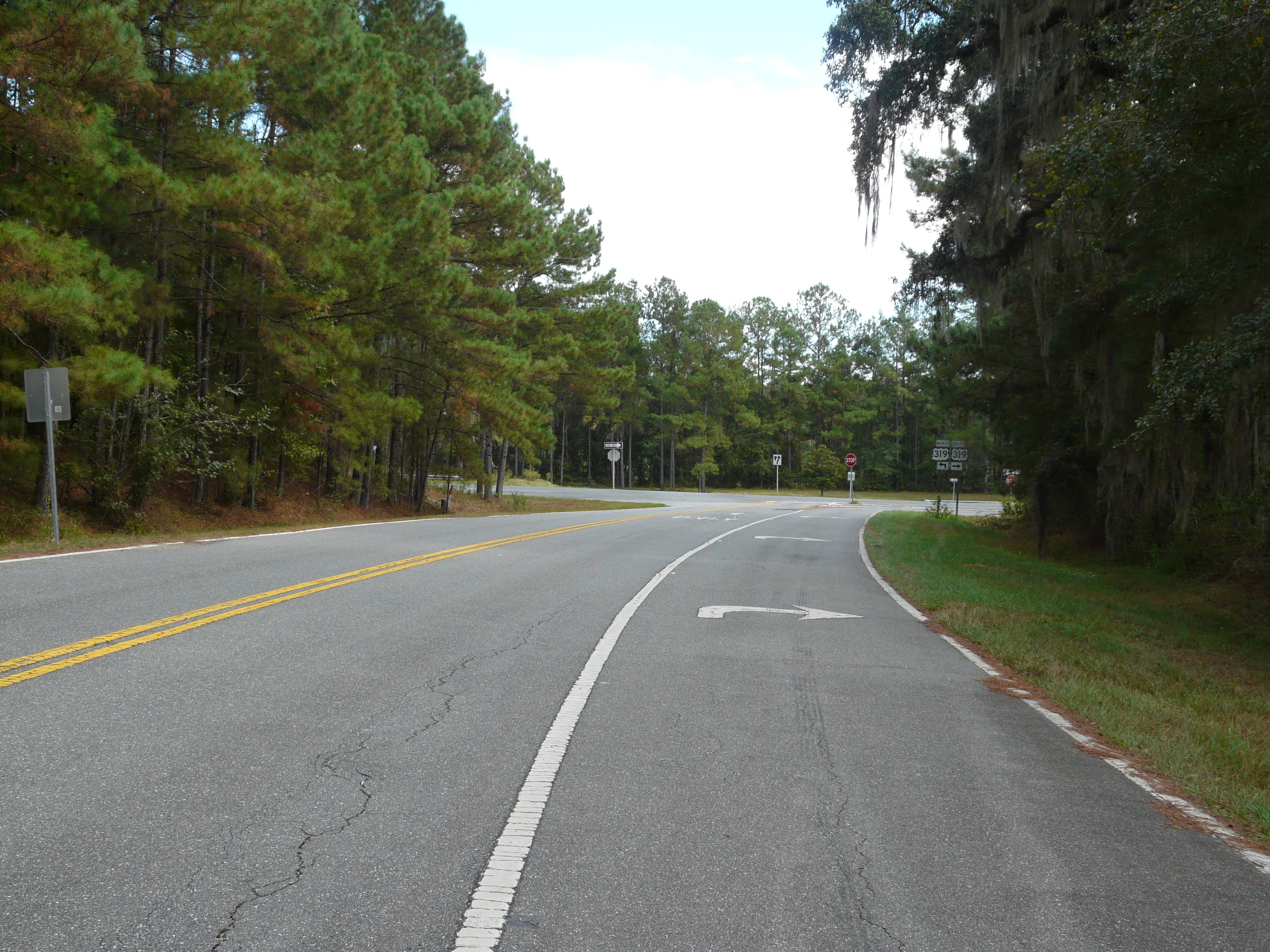
Leon CR-12 at US-319 in Iamonia

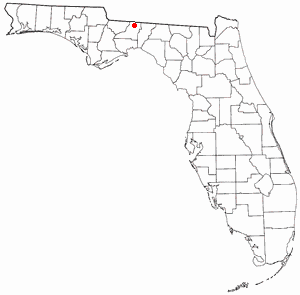
Location of Iamonia, Florida

Iamonia (pronounced /aɪəmoʊniːə/) is an unincorporated community in Leon County, Florida, United States. It is located along U.S. Route 319 and the eastern terminus of County Road 12, just south of the Georgia border.
