= National Register of Historic Places listings in Jefferson County, Florida =

Location of Jefferson County in Florida

This is a list of the National Register of Historic Places listings in Jefferson County, Florida.

This is intended to be a complete list of the properties and districts on the National Register of Historic Places in Jefferson County, Florida, United States. The locations of National Register properties and districts for which the latitude and longitude coordinates are included below, may be seen in a map.

There are 24 properties and districts listed on the National Register in the county, and 2 boundary increases and decreases for properties.

This National Park Service list is complete through NPS recent listings posted May 22, 2026.

Contents: Counties in Florida (non-linked contain no National Register listings)
Alachua - Baker - Bay - Bradford - Brevard - Broward - Calhoun - Charlotte - Citrus - Clay - Collier - Columbia - DeSoto - Dixie - Duval - Escambia - Flagler - Franklin - Gadsden - Gilchrist - Glades - Gulf - Hamilton - Hardee - Hendry - Hernando - Highlands - Hillsborough (Tampa) - Holmes - Indian River - Jackson - Jefferson - Lafayette - Lake - Lee - Leon - Levy - Liberty - Madison - Manatee - Marion - Martin - Miami-Dade (Miami) - Monroe - Nassau - Okaloosa - Okeechobee - Orange - Osceola - Palm Beach - Pasco - Pinellas - Polk - Putnam - St. Johns - St. Lucie - Santa Rosa - Sarasota - Seminole - Sumter - Suwannee - Taylor - Union - Volusia - Wakulla - Walton - Washington

== Current listings ==
	Name on the Register	Image	Date listed	Location	City or town	Description
1	Bethel School	Bethel School	October 12, 2001 (#01001084)	County Road 149; 30°36′49″N 83°50′16″W	Monticello	
2	Denham-Lacy House	Denham-Lacy House	May 6, 1982 (#82002376)	555 Palmer Mill Road; 30°32′36″N 83°52′25″W	Monticello	
3	Dennis-Coxetter House	Dennis-Coxetter House	October 20, 1988 (#88002025)	Junction of State Roads 59 and 158; 30°28′41″N 84°01′23″W	Lloyd	
4	Dixie Plantation	Dixie Plantation	January 24, 2022 (#100007362)	1583 Livingston Rd. 30°37′06″N 83°41′42″W	Greenville vicinity	
5	Girardeau House	Girardeau House	June 30, 2011 (#11000382)	950 East Washington Street; 30°32′44″N 83°51′42″W	Monticello	
6	Jefferson County Jail	Jefferson County Jail	January 15, 2014 (#13001072)	380 West Dogwood Street; 30°32′45″N 83°52′21″W	Monticello	
7	Letchworth Mounds Archaeological Site	Letchworth Mounds Archaeological Site	December 15, 2010 (#10001034)	4500 Sunray Road; 30°31′19″N 83°59′26″W	Tallahassee vicinity	
8	Lloyd Historic District	Lloyd Historic District	September 5, 1991 (#91001374)	Roughly Main Street north of Bond Street and Bond east of Main; 30°28′43″N 84°01′25″W	Lloyd	There was a boundary decrease on June 27, 2002 (refnum 02000710)
9	Lloyd Railroad Depot	Lloyd Railroad Depot	December 2, 1974 (#74000645)	Near the junction of State Road 59 and Lester Lawrence Road; 30°28′40″N 84°01′19″W	Lloyd	
10	Lloyd Woman's Club	Lloyd Woman's Club	August 10, 1998 (#98000926)	Bond Street; 30°28′39″N 84°01′38″W	Lloyd	Part of the Clubhouses of Florida's Woman's Clubs MPS
11	Lloyd-Bond House	Lloyd-Bond House	November 1, 1984 (#84000198)	Bond Street; 30°28′41″N 84°01′24″W	Lloyd	
12	Lyndhurst Plantation	Lyndhurst Plantation	April 2, 1973 (#73000582)	15 miles (24 km) northeast of Monticello off Ashville Road; 30°35′15″N 83°39′11″W	Monticello	
13	Asa May House	Asa May House	December 15, 1972 (#72000329)	North of the junction of U.S. Routes 19 and 27; 30°24′52″N 83°54′40″W	Capps	
14	Monticello High School	Monticello High School	March 25, 1999 (#99000373)	425 West Washington Street; 30°32′40″N 83°52′31″W	Monticello	
15	Monticello Historic District	Monticello Historic District	August 19, 1977 (#77000405)	Irregular pattern along Madison, Jefferson, Dogwood, and Washington Streets; 30°32′43″N 83°52′05″W	Monticello	
16	Old Howard Academy	Old Howard Academy	July 19, 2021 (#100006751)	835 Mamie Scott Dr. 30°33′12″N 83°51′51″W	Monticello	
17	Palmer House	Palmer House	November 21, 1978 (#78000947)	Palmer Mill Road and South Jefferson Street; 30°32′37″N 83°52′16″W	Monticello	
18	Palmer-Perkins House	Palmer-Perkins House	July 10, 1979 (#79000674)	625 West Palmer Mill Road; also Walnut Street; 30°32′38″N 83°52′30″W	Monticello	Walnut Street represents a boundary increase, on March 18, 1986 (refnum 86000466).
19	Perkins Opera House	Perkins Opera House	September 14, 1972 (#72000330)	Washington Street and Courthouse Square; 30°32′41″N 83°52′15″W	Monticello	
20	San Joseph de Ocuya Site		May 7, 1973 (#73000580)	Address Restricted	Lloyd	
21	San Juan De Aspalaga Site		May 7, 1973 (#73000581)	Address Restricted	Wacissa	
22	San Miguel de Asile Mission Site		December 17, 1974 (#74000644)	Address Restricted	Lamont	
23	Turnbull-Ritter House	Turnbull-Ritter House	July 18, 1979 (#79000673)	Northwest of Lamont off U.S. Route 19; 30°28′28″N 83°54′18″W	Lamont	
24	Wirick-Simmons House	Wirick-Simmons House	June 30, 1972 (#72000331)	Jefferson and Pearl Streets; 30°32′46″N 83°52′12″W	Monticello	

== See also ==
- List of National Historic Landmarks in Florida
- National Register of Historic Places listings in Florida
