= Ritter =

Ritter may refer to:

== People ==
- Ritter (surname), includes a list of people with the name
- Ritter (title), used for nobility in German-speaking areas

== Places ==
- Ritter (crater), a lunar crater located near Mare Tranquillitatis
- Ritter, Iowa, a community in the United States
- Ritter Island, a small volcanic island northeast of New Guinea
- Ritter Park, a public park in Huntington, West Virginia
- Ritter Range, a small mountain range in California's Sierra Nevada
  - Mount Ritter, the highest peak the Ritter Range

== Schools ==
- Cardinal Ritter College Prep High School, a high school in St. Louis, Missouri
- Cardinal Ritter High School, a high school in Indianapolis, Indiana
- Liegnitz Ritter-Akademie, a German knight academy founded in the 17th century
- Wolfenbüttel Ritter-Akademie, a German knight academy founded in 1688

== Structures ==
- Frank Ritter Memorial Ice Arena, an ice arena in Rochester, New York
- Ritter Observatory, including Ritter Planetarium, a facility adjacent to Brooks Observatory at the University of Toledo (in Ohio)
- Turnbull-Ritter House, also known as the Sunrise Plantation, an historic home near Lamont, Florida

== Brands and enterprises ==
- Ritter Bass Guitars, a manufacturer of high-end electric bass guitars
- Ritter Sport, a German chocolate bar

== Science and healthcare ==
- Ritter reaction, an organic chemistry reaction
- Ritter's disease, another name for staphylococcal scalded skin syndrome
