= Jefferson County Schools (Florida) =

School district in Florida, United States

Jefferson County Schools, also known as the Jefferson County School Board or the Jefferson School District, is a public school district headquartered in Monticello, Florida. It serves all of Jefferson County. Aucilla Christian School is the private school in Jefferson County.

== History ==
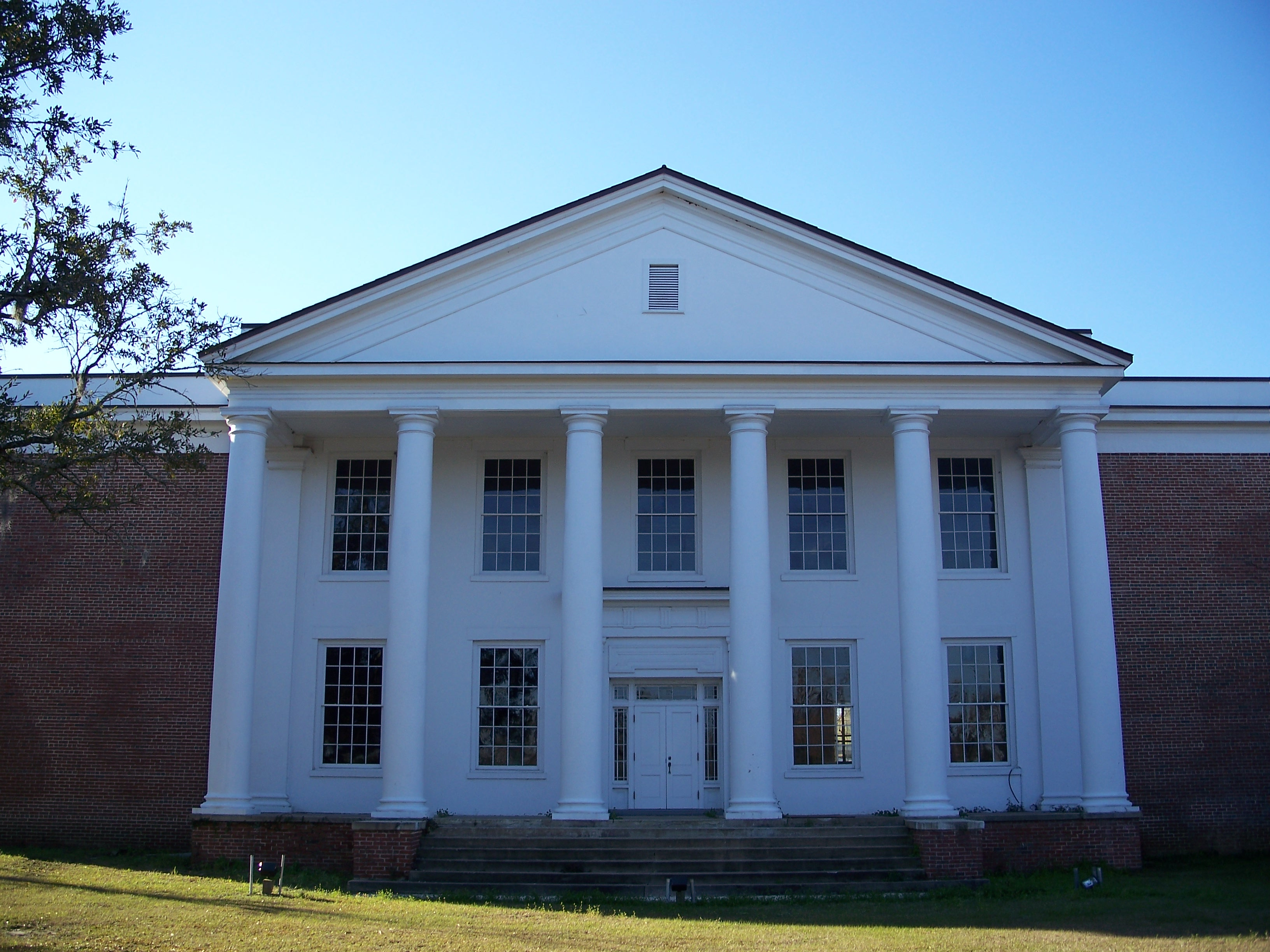
Former Jefferson County Middle / High School, which is on the property which has the school district headquarters

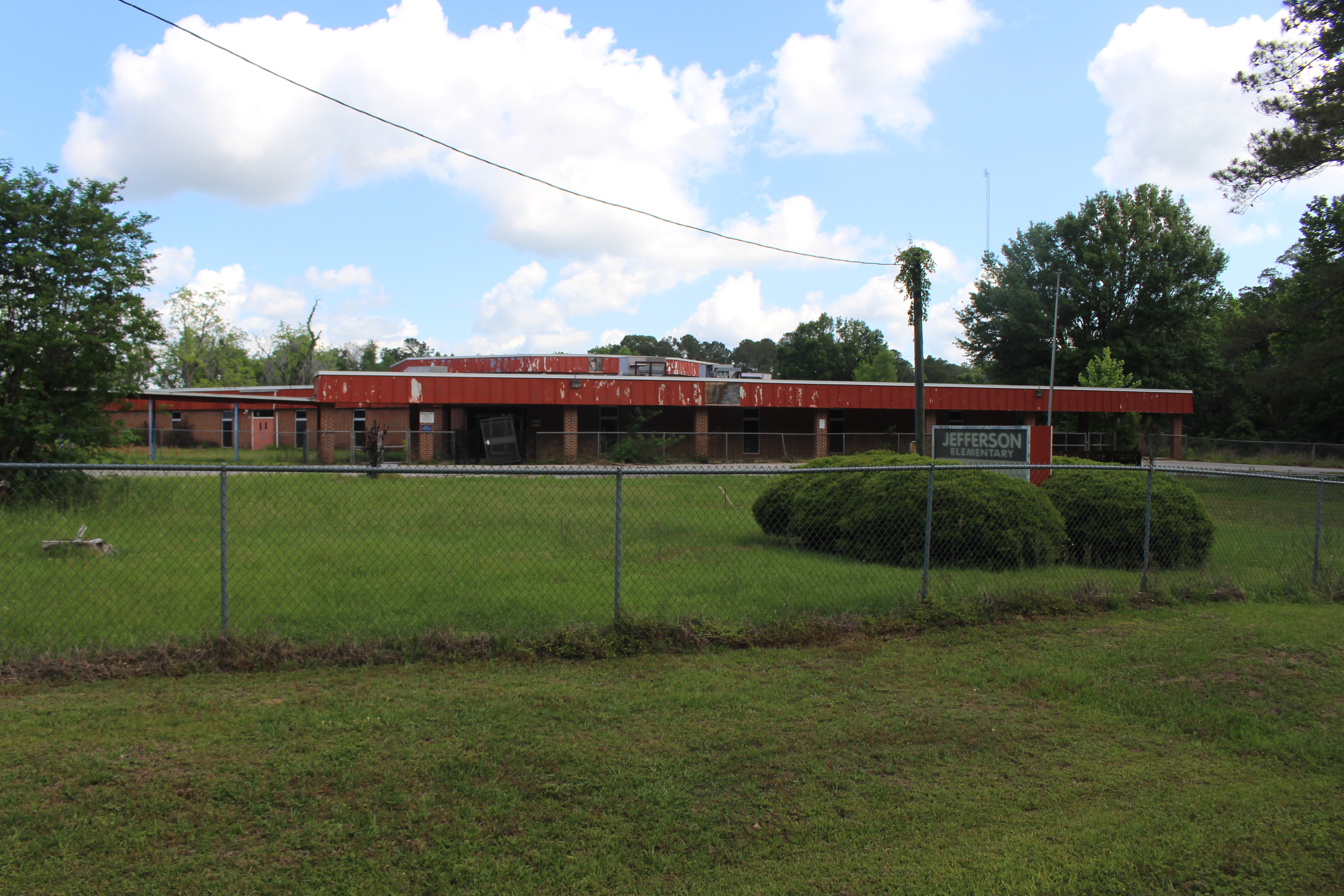
Former Jefferson Elementary School

In 2001 the district had 1,709 pupils.

In 2003, the school district approved plans to move the high school from its 1832 location and construct a new facility on 127 acres 4 miles south of the original school. Construction was complete in time for the high school to make the move for the 2004-2005 school year. The district had planned to build a new middle school next to the new high school by 2009. However, in the fall of 2005, the district had no choice but to expedite this move and cram the middle school into the new high school campus. The merge of the two schools changed the high schools name to Jefferson County Middle/High.

On April 23, 2009, the Florida Department of Education (FDOE) took over financial oversight of the district to rescue it from a declared financial emergency due to budget deficits. In June 2011, the district exited financial emergency one year sooner than expected due to efforts from District faculty and staff; subsequently, it operated for two years with a fund balance well over the mandated 3%.

Prior to 2016 White and African-American board members were in conflict.

In 2015 the state government reduced the amount of money going into the district, which by then had 882 students, at that point the lowest such number ever. The racial conflict in the board intensified when African-Americans gained the majority in 2016. That year its financial status was declared to be under emergency, and no other district at the time in Florida had such a status. In the summer of 2016 the FDOE decided that the elected school board should make a plan to change its governance significantly. The state DOE again took financial control in 2017 due to missing money, low school grades and questionable staffing decisions.

By January 2017 enrollment was down to 700. In February 2017 the school board, under prompting from the state, decided to make all schools be charter schools. Somerset Academy, Inc. was hired as the operator. Jefferson County is the only Florida school district to ever be controlled by a charter network. From 2017 to 2022, the schools were known as Jefferson Somerset K-12 School, also known as Somerset Academy Jefferson County

In 2022, the FDOE was unable to find a new operator for the charter schools, and the state allowed a locally elected board to take control once again. The FDOE returned control to the local school board on February 9, 2022 but the district must submit a monthly budget report to the state for one year and maintain a minimum 5% unassigned fund balance.

At the start of the 2022-2023 school year, the district opened its rebranded K-12 school with a total of 800 students. The district had successfully hired over 40 new faculty and staff members to turnaround the school and the district.

== Demographics ==
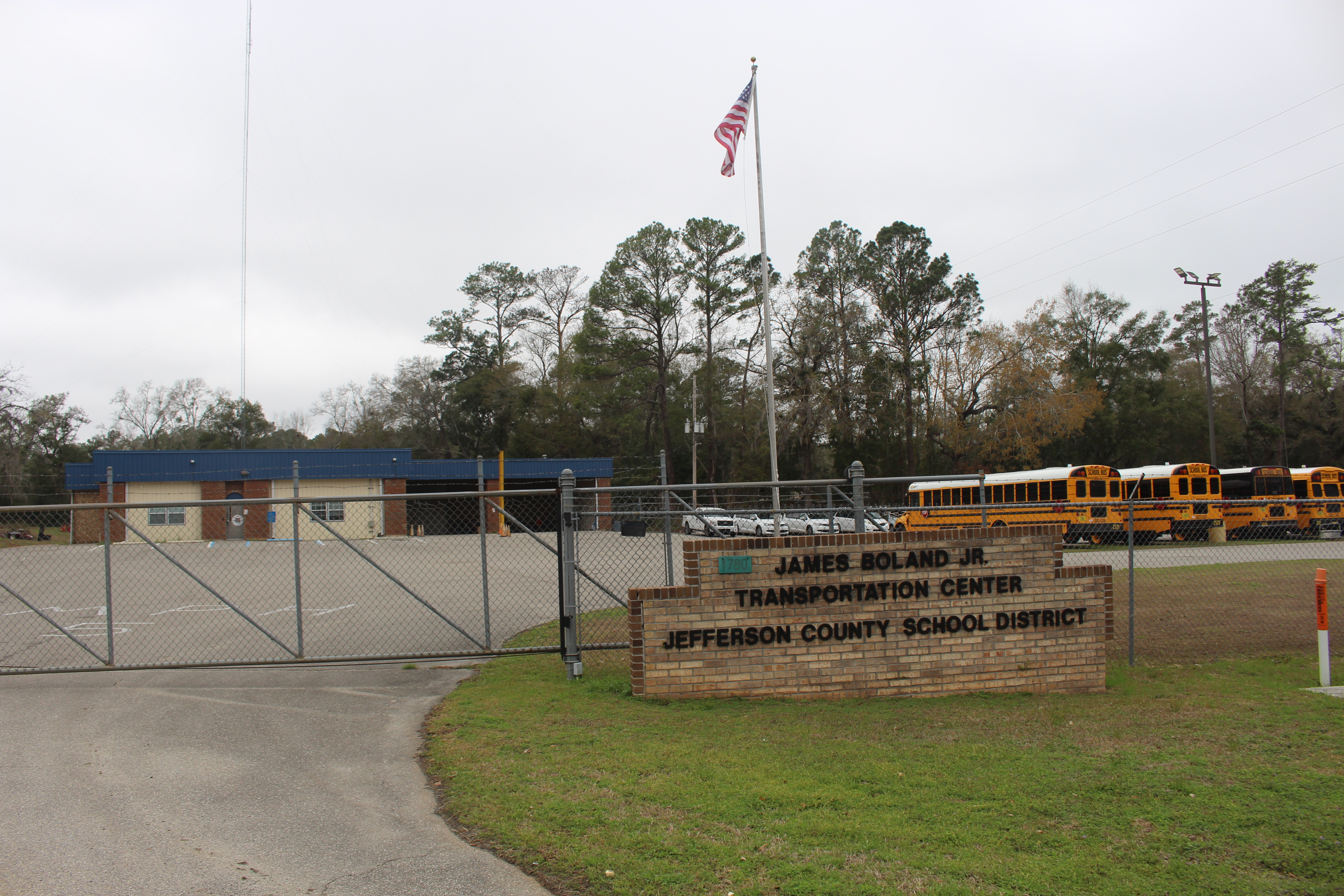
James Boland Jr. Transportation Center

Throughout the 1980s and 1990s, Jefferson Elementary averaged total enrollment of 900 students each year. Demographically the school averaged 50% African-American and 50% White students. During the 2000s, Jefferson Elementary experienced a decrease in enrollment, averaging 500-600 students each year. The school also experienced a 20-25% decrease in white student enrollment. Prior to the elementary school merging with the middle and high school in 2017, enrollment had declined to 390 students, 75% African-American and 25% White.

By the 2010s the public school system was majority African-American even though the majority of the county's population is non-Hispanic White. In 2016 it had about 800 students, with about 66% being African-American. In earlier eras after de jure segregation ended, the student population was 75% African-American. Some white students attend school districts in other counties and others attend a private school.

== Schools ==
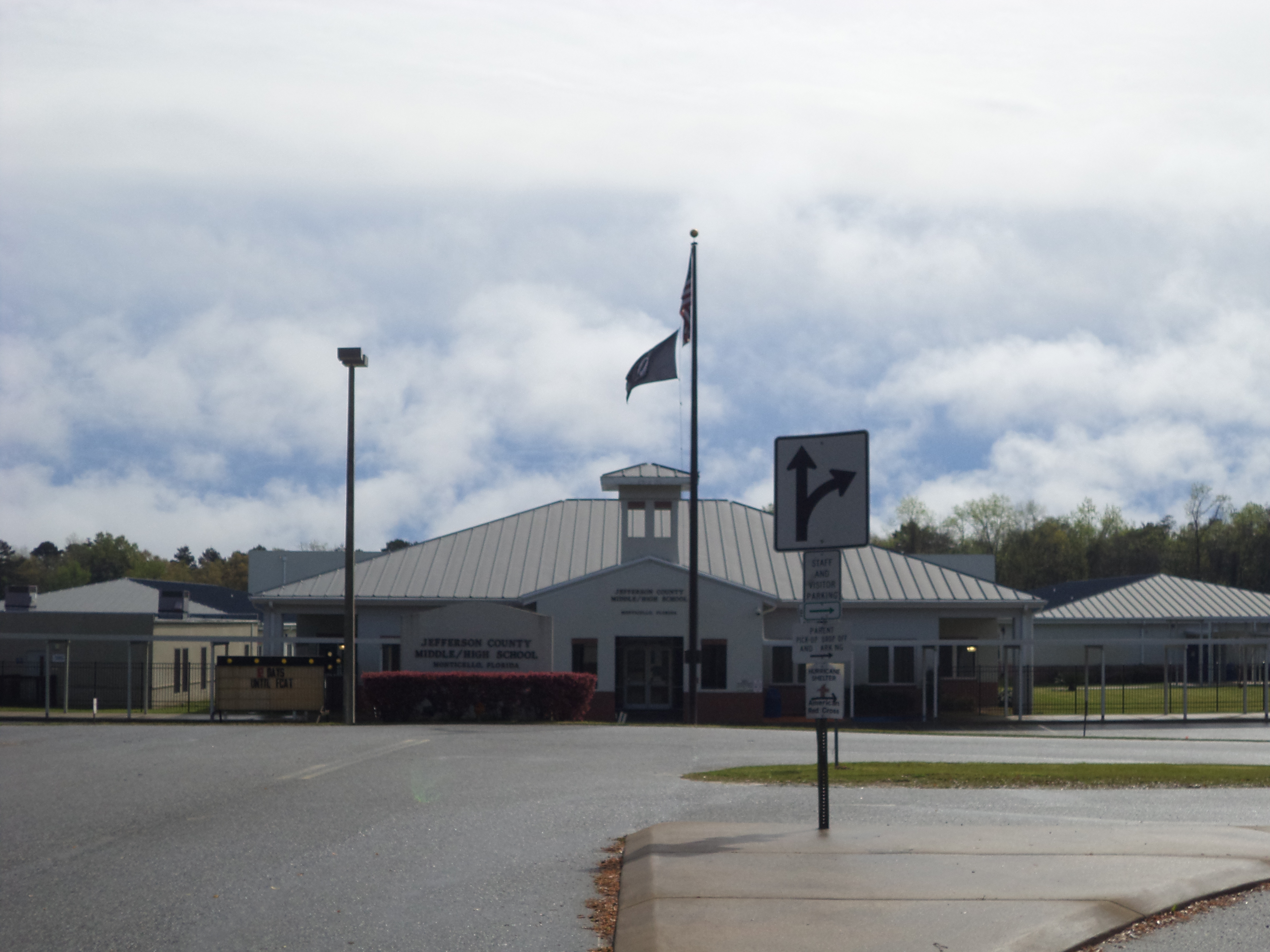
Jefferson County Middle/High School (current building)

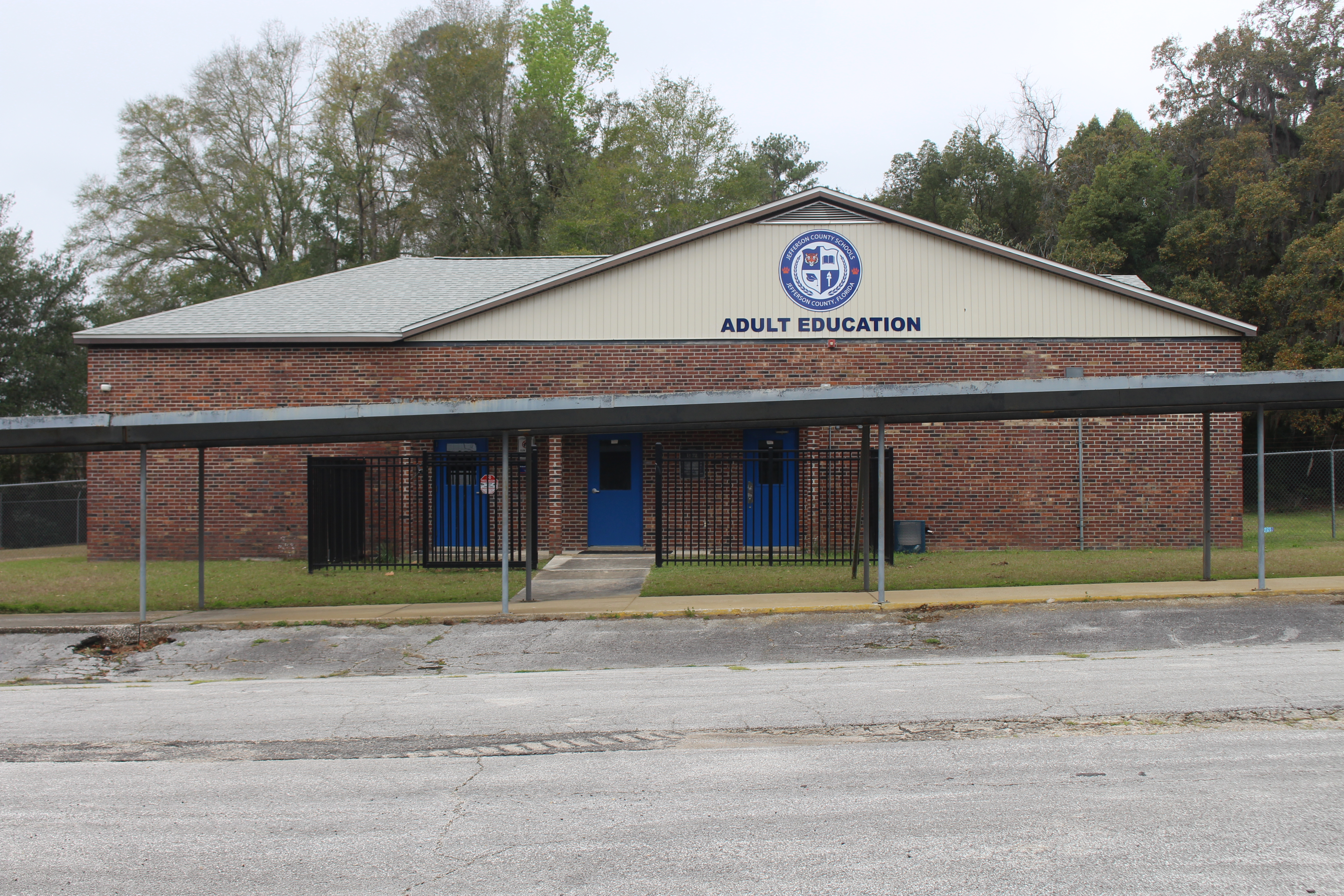
Adult Education building

- Jefferson County Middle / High School – The National Center for Education Statistics (NCES) counts it as three separate schools:
  - High School
  - Middle School
  - Elementary School
- Jefferson County Adult School

Former divisions:

- Jefferson Elementary School
- Howard Middle School – Opened in 1970, taking the space of Howard Academy. It closed in 2004. In 2019 the district was considering selling the building, but it had not decided on a plan yet.
- Jefferson County High School
- Howard Academy – The school for African-American students before desegregation. The first building opened in 1936 with a second in 1940. The last building opened in 1957, as a K-8 school, with high school grades coming in 1960. In 1970, schools were integrated and it became the middle school for the county. The original buildings stopped being used after the 1960s.
