= Jefferson County Middle / High School =

Jefferson County Middle/High School
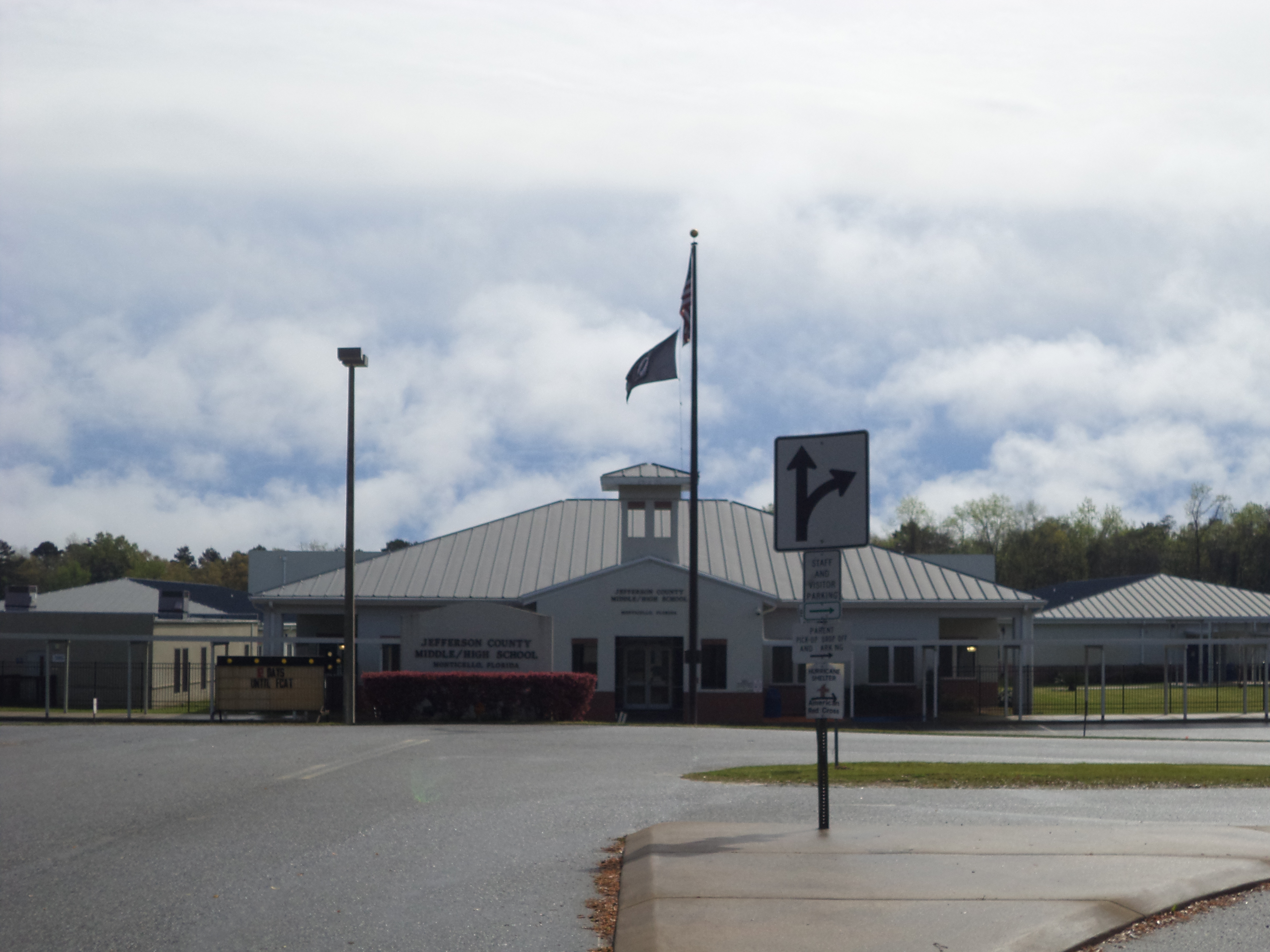

Location
- 50 David Road; Monticello, Jefferson County, Florida 32344; United States; 30.4908°N 83.8794°W

Information
- School type: Public
- School district: Jefferson County Schools (Florida)
- Principal: Jackie Pons
- Enrollment: 366 (2022-23)
- Colors: Blue and orange
- Nickname: Tigers
- Website: https://www.jeffersonschools.net/jeffersonk12school

Jefferson County Middle / High School (JCMHS) is a public school in unincorporated Jefferson County, Florida, with a Monticello postal address. A part of Jefferson County Schools, it serves grades 6 – 12. The school's mascot is a tiger and the school colors are orange and blue. It is at 50 David Road, 4 miles (6.4 km) south of the center of Monticello. The school was formerly housed in the historic Jefferson Academy building, opened in 1852 in the first brick school building in Florida. Minority enrollment at Jefferson County Middle / High School is about 340 and 84 percent minority. It was operated by Somerset Academy Inc. for five years. The student body is majority-minority, about 60 percent African American. The current facility opened in 2004. It had a cost of $17,200,000.
