= Loomis Dean =

American photographer

Loomis Dean (September 19, 1917 – December 7, 2005) was a veteran Life Magazine photographer who shot pictures of circus clowns, crown princes, celebrities, Madagascar lemurs, and SS Andrea Doria survivors in a five-decade long career. His low-key manner disarmed his subjects and put them at ease, enabling Dean to capture such images as the prince of Liechtenstein in his long johns and Noël Coward in a tuxedo in the desert.

== Early life ==
Loomis was the son of a grocer and a schoolteacher and was originally from Monticello, Florida. He became fascinated with photography while watching a friend print a photograph in a darkroom, and later chose to study photography at the Eastman School of Photography in Rochester, New York.

His first photography job in 1938 was as an advance man and photographer for the Ringling Bros. and Barnum & Bailey Circus. He was an Army Air Forces photographer in the Pacific Ocean during World War II, and he later got his first job as a press agent for the Ringling Brothers circus. He rode the circus train across the country, shooting clowns, acrobats and lion tamers and processing his pictures in hotel bathtubs.

== Life magazine ==
In 1947, he joined the staff of Life, photographing celebrities including Elvis Presley, Lucille Ball, Noël Coward, Ernest Hemingway, and Liberace. He also shot pictures of royal weddings, popes, fashion shows, riots and wars. In 1956, while sailing to Paris aboard SS Île de France to take a job in the magazine's bureau there, Dean photographed the sinking and the rescue of passengers from the ocean liner SS Andrea Doria.

In 1965, out of 400 contestants, Dean won the Papal Prize in the Vatican's Ecumenical Council Photographic Exhibition. The winning color photograph showed white-robed bishops bearing the pope's tiara marching in solemn procession through St. Peter's Square. It appeared in Life on November 2, 1962.

== After Life ==
After Life magazine folded in 1972, he worked freelance for movie studios and news magazines. He was also an accomplished sailor and a collector of cameras. At any given time, he rarely had fewer than three cameras around his neck.
