= Old Howard Academy =

School in Monticello, Florida, U.S. (1936–1960)

- U.S. National Register of Historic Places
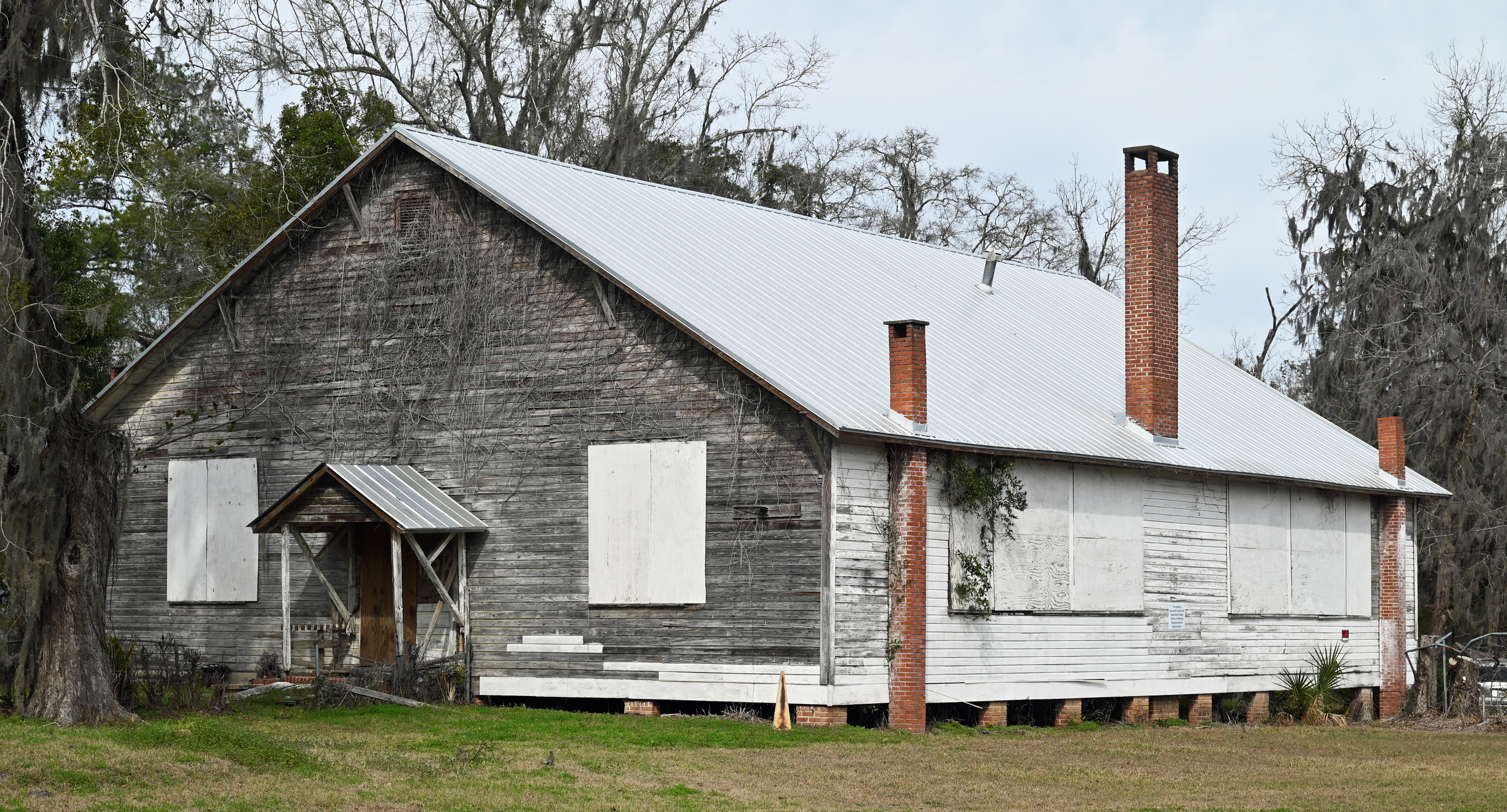
- Howard Academy Building 1

- Location within Florida
- Location: 835 Mamie Scott Drive, Monticello, Florida, U.S.
- Coordinates: 30°33′06″N 83°51′53″W
- Area: 1.44 acres (0.58 ha)
- MPS: Florida's Historic Black Public Schools MPS
- NRHP reference No.: 100006751
- Added to NRHP: July 19, 2021

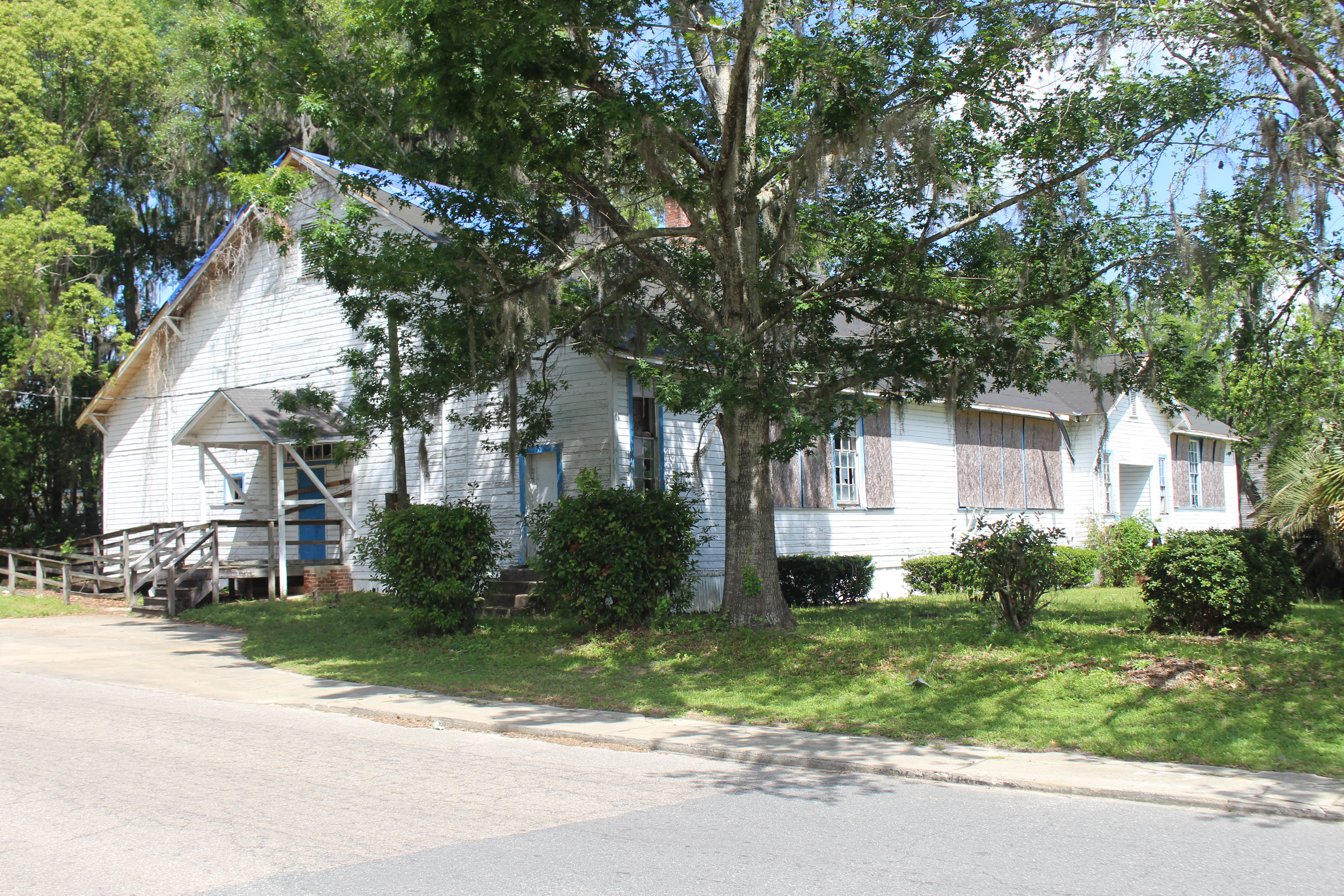
Howard Academy Building 2

Old Howard Academy is a former school for Black students in Monticello, Florida at 665 East Chestnut Street, now 835 Mamie Scott Drive. It was operated by the Jeanes Fund from 1936 until 1960. It has been listed on the National Register of Historic Places since July 19, 2021; and a historical marker commemorates the schools' history.

== History ==
22 acres (8.9 ha) of land for the original Howard Academy school was donated by Etta and Dess Sneed, a local family. In 1957 a new elementary school and junior high were built on second street and in 1960 a new high school for black students was added, eventually named Howard Academy. Schools in Monticello were integrated in 1967.

The Old Howard Academy site consists of an original one-story wood frame building completed in 1936 and a second wood frame building added in 1940 for high school students.

== Legacy and recent history ==
In 2025, a local non-profit proposed a horse facility on the property. Descendants of the family who donated had the land to the county for use as a school objected, and pointed to stipulations in the original agreement.

In October 2021, Florida Secretary of State Laurel M. Lee announced the school buildings being added to the National Park Service's National Register of Historic Places. The buildings had been vacant and awaited funds for restoration.

Mamie Scott, the namesake of the street, was the supervisor of the Jeanes Fund in Jefferson County, Florida.

== See also ==
- National Register of Historic Places listings in Jefferson County, Florida
- Rosenwald School
- Bethel School (Monticello, Florida)
