= Girardeau House =

- U.S. National Register of Historic Places
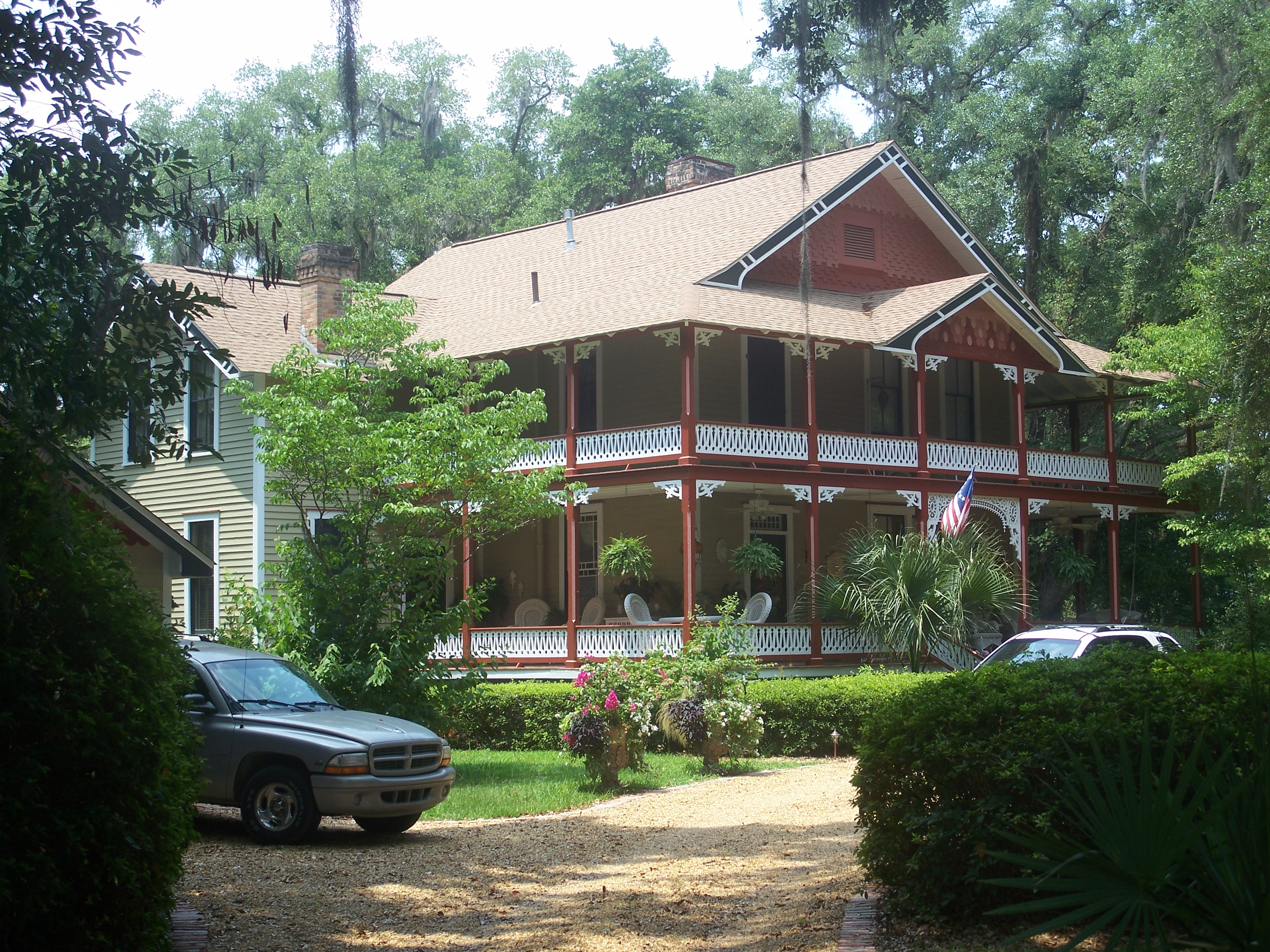

- Location within Florida Location within the United States
- Location: Monticello, Florida
- Coordinates: 30°32′44″N 83°51′42″W
- NRHP reference No.: 11000382
- Added to NRHP: June 30, 2011

Girardeau House is a national historic site located at 950 East Washington Street, Monticello, Florida in Jefferson County.

It was added to the National Register of Historic Places on June 30, 2011.
