= Ryal Long =

American politician

William Ryal Long

Member of the Florida House of Representatives
- In office 1873–1877
- Constituency: Jefferson County, Florida

Personal details
- Born: c. 1833 Georgia, United States
- Died: ?
- Party: Democratic
- Occupation: Blacksmith, politician

William Ryal Long (c. 1833 – ?) was a politician and public official in Florida during the Reconstruction era. He served in the Florida House of Representatives in 1873, 1874 and 1877. He lived in Monticello, Florida and represented Jefferson County, Florida. He was a Democrat.

He was born in Georgia in about 1833 and was a blacksmith by trade.

Before becoming a Representative he was a Jefferson County tax assessor from 1869 until 1870 and county commissioner from 1870 until 1874.

Described as a free person of color and colored, he was required to have a guardian and could only acquire land through the guardian. A legal dispute arose over land Long purchased in this manner.
