= Andrew Jackson Junius =

American politician

Andrew Jackson Junius was a carpenter, Baptist minister and state representative in Florida. He represented Jefferson County, Florida in the Florida House of Representatives in 1879.

== See also ==
- African American officeholders from the end of the Civil War until before 1900
