= Lyndhurst Plantation =

Historic house in Florida, United States

- U.S. National Register of Historic Places
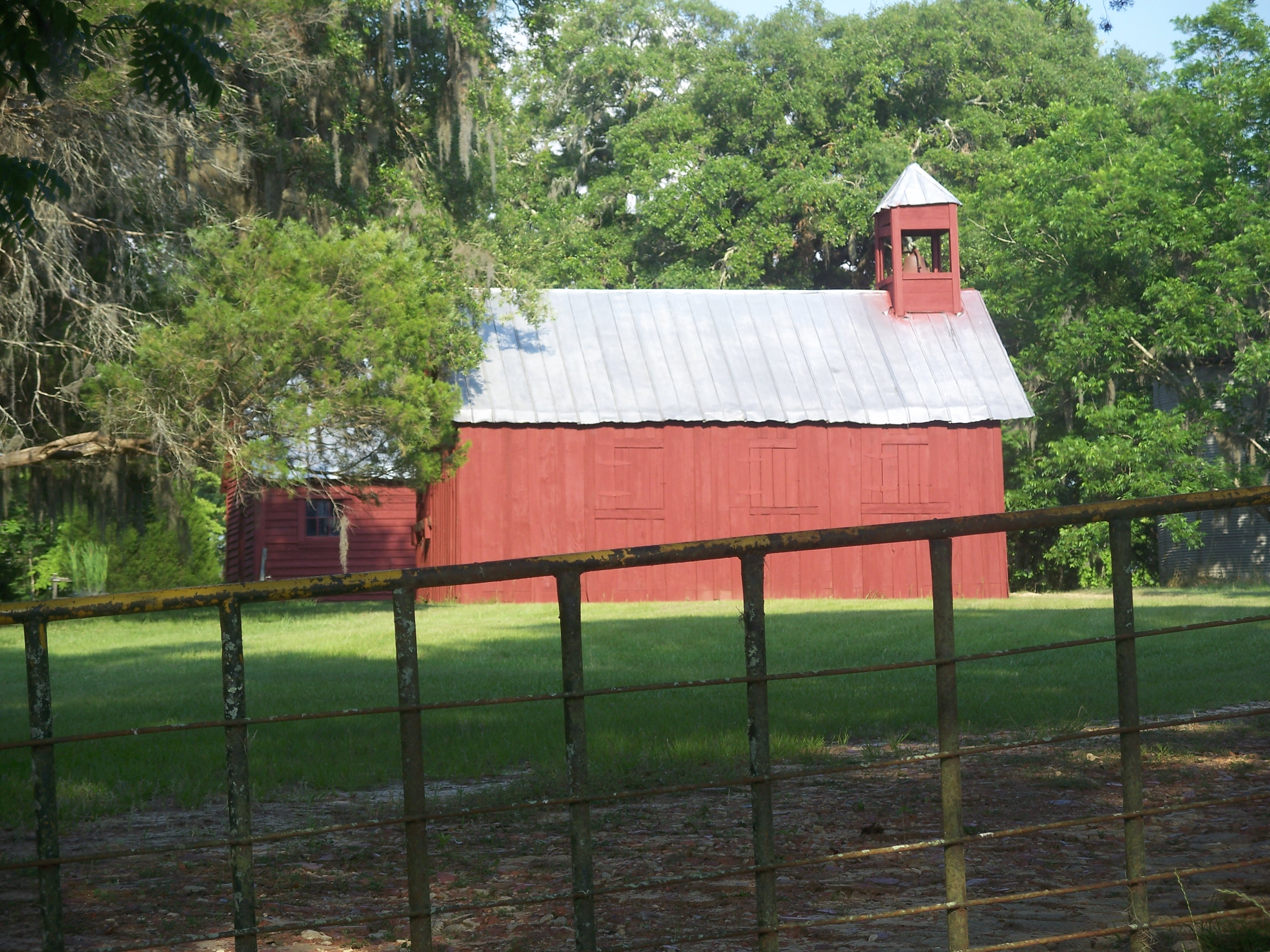

- Location within Florida Location within the United States
- Location: Jefferson County, Florida
- Nearest city: Monticello
- Coordinates: 30°35′15″N 83°39′11″W
- Architectural style: Greek Revival
- NRHP reference No.: 73000582
- Added to NRHP: April 2, 1973

The Lyndhurst Plantation is a historic slave plantation in unincorporated Jefferson County, Florida. It is located 15 miles (24 km) northeast of Monticello, off Ashville Road. On April 2, 1973, it was added to the U.S. National Register of Historic Places.
