= Wirick-Simmons House =

Historic house in Florida, United States

- U.S. National Register of Historic Places
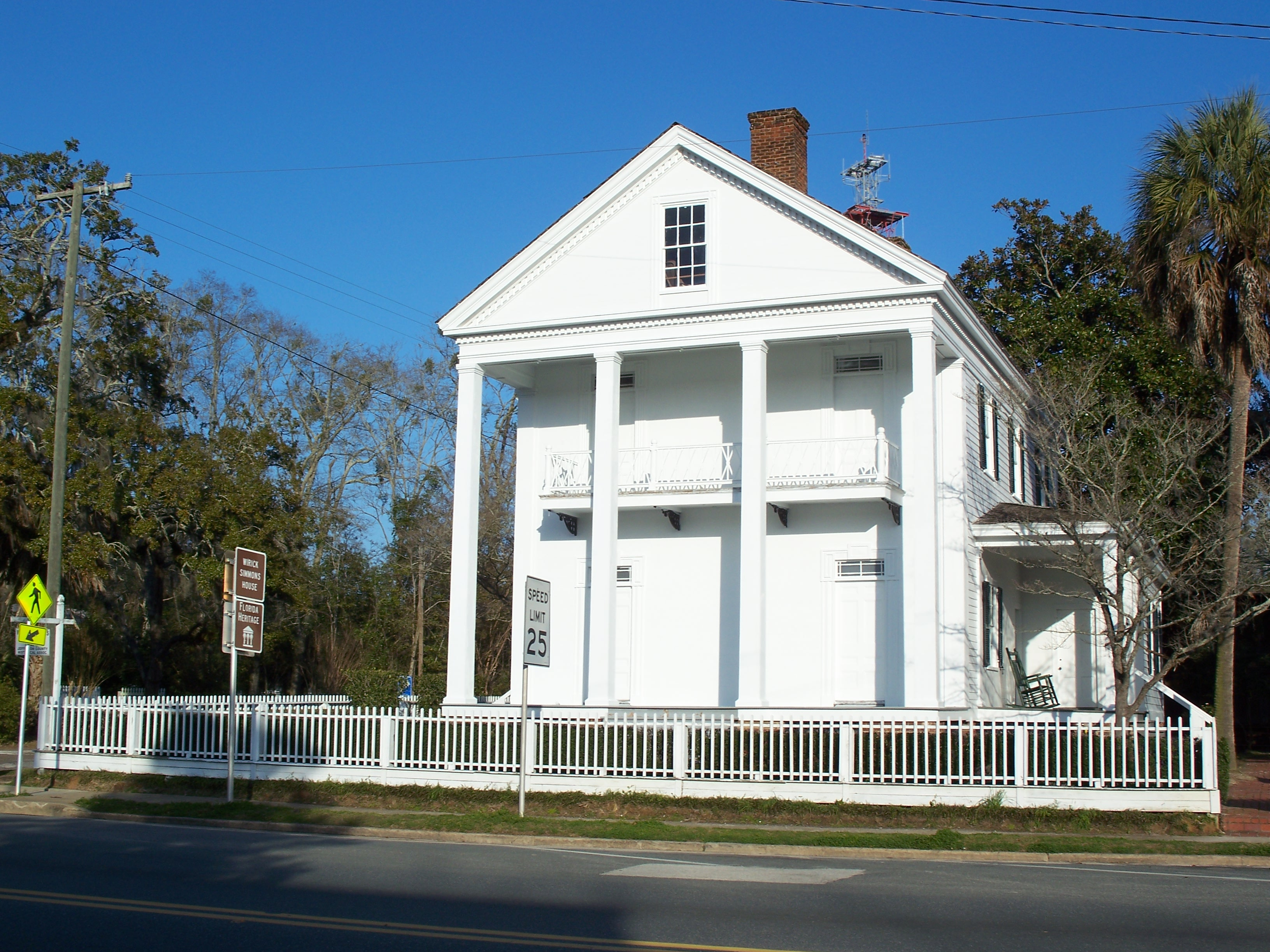

- Location within Florida Location within the United States
- Location: Monticello, Florida
- Coordinates: 30°32′46″N 83°52′12″W
- Built: 1830s
- Architectural style: Greek Revival
- NRHP reference No.: 72000331
- Added to NRHP: June 30, 1972

The Wirick-Simmons House is a historic home in Monticello, Florida. It is located at Jefferson and Pearl Streets. The two-and-a-half story Greek Revival house was built in 1831 by Reverend Adam Wirick, a Methodist "Circuit Rider", and since 1871 has been occupied by Thomas Simmons and his descendants. On June 30, 1972, it was added to the U.S. National Register of Historic Places.

The house owned by the Jefferson County Historical Association, and serves as the organization's headquarters. Tours are offered during special events.

== Gallery ==
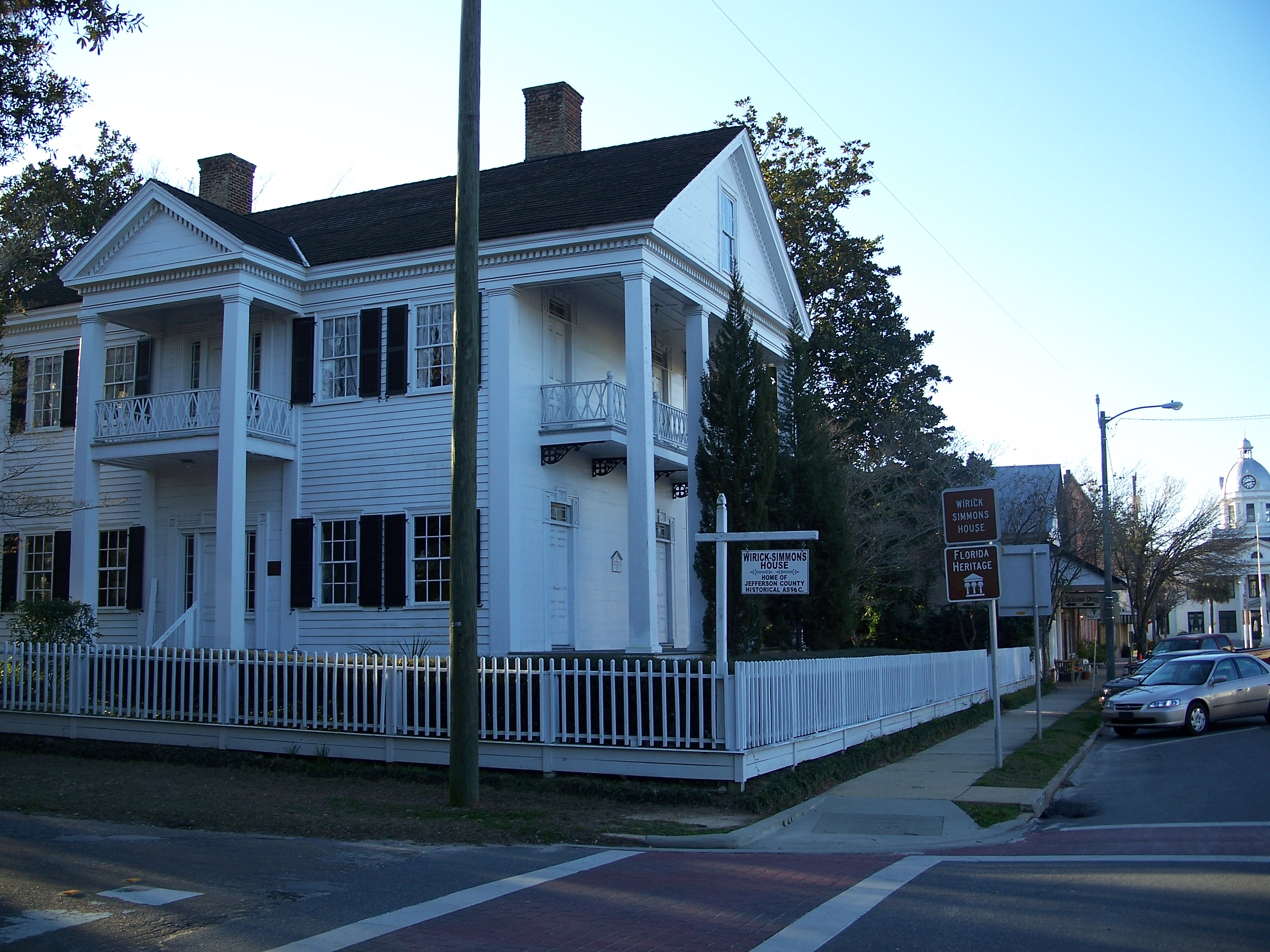

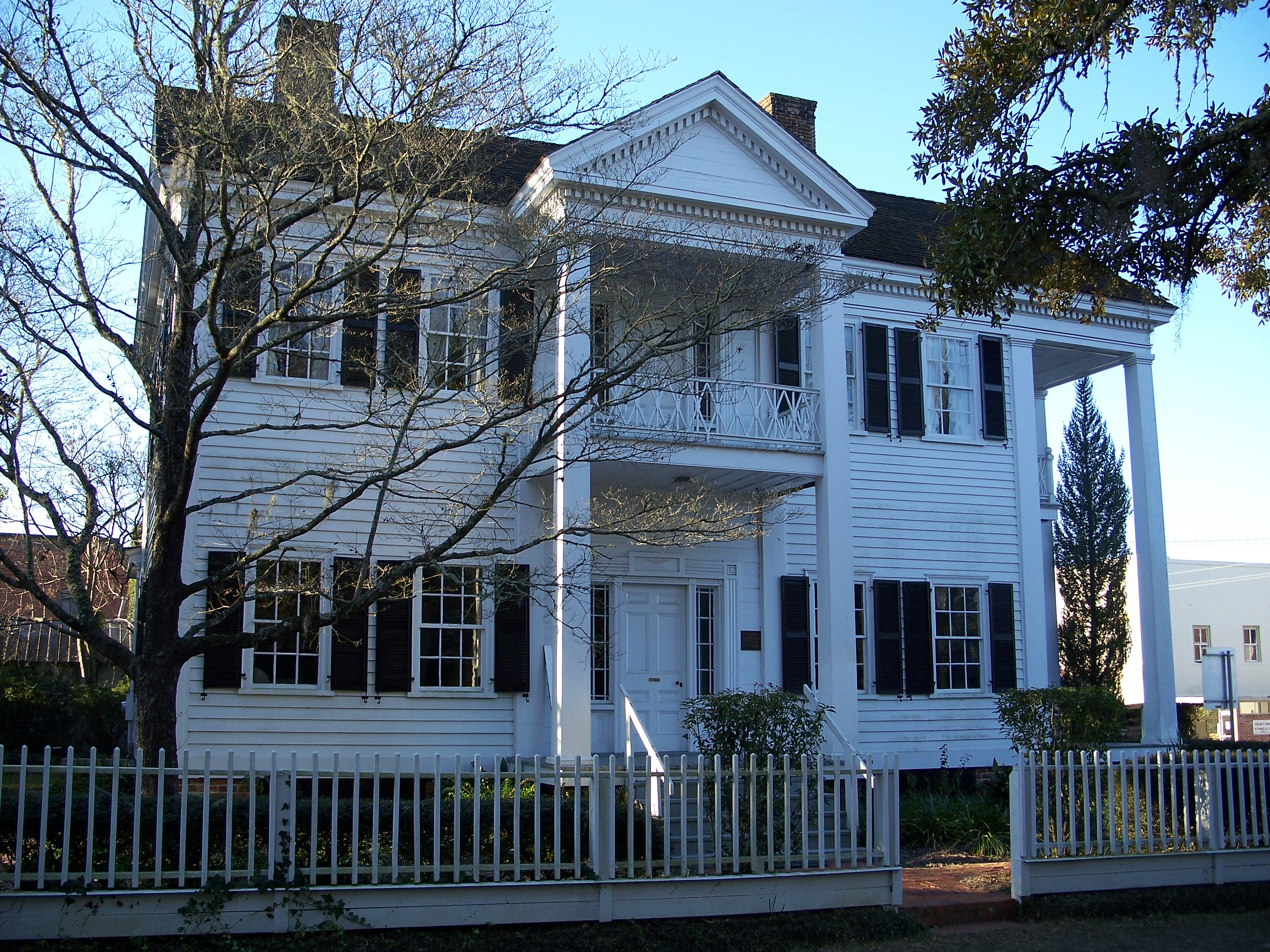

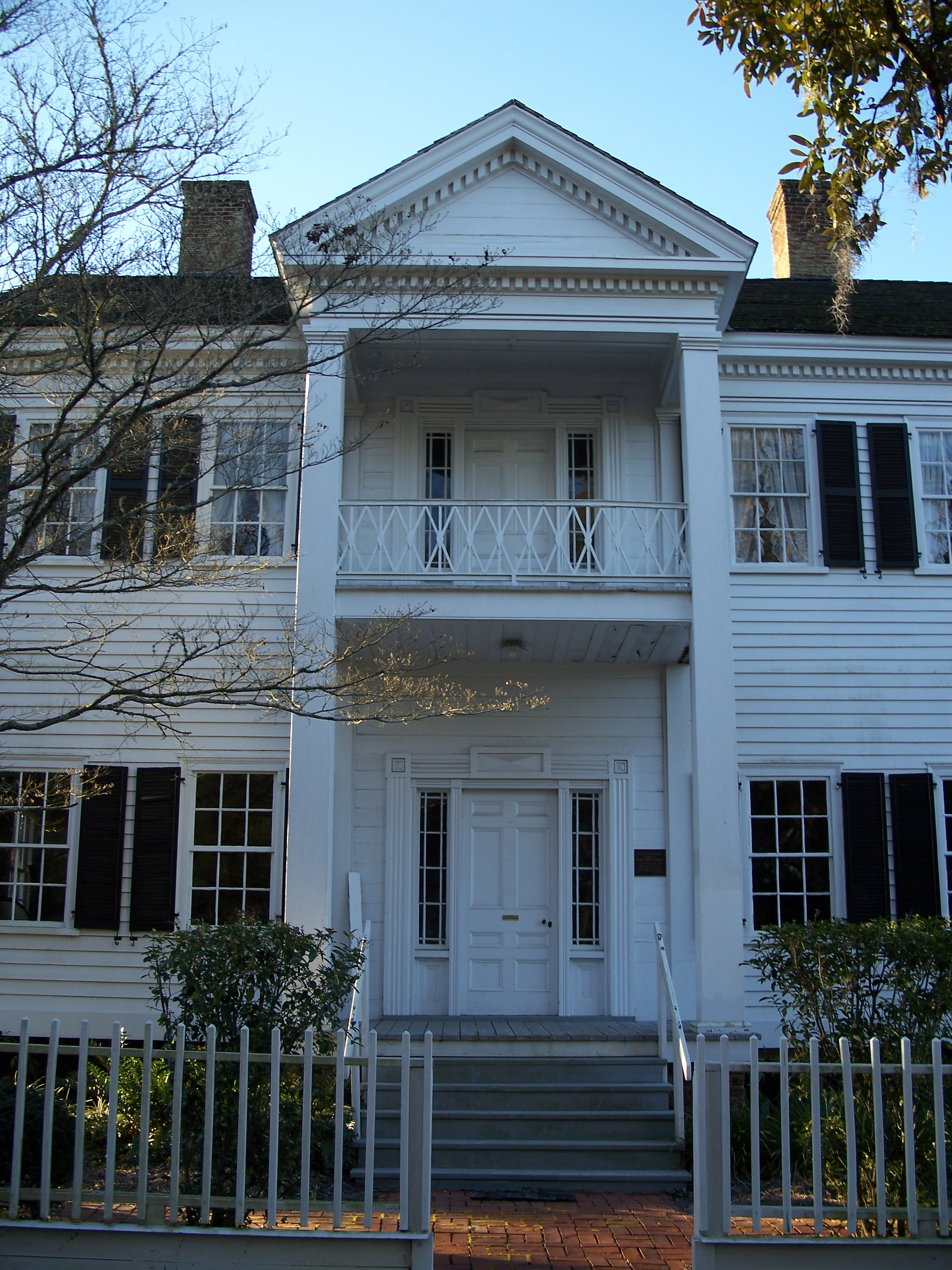

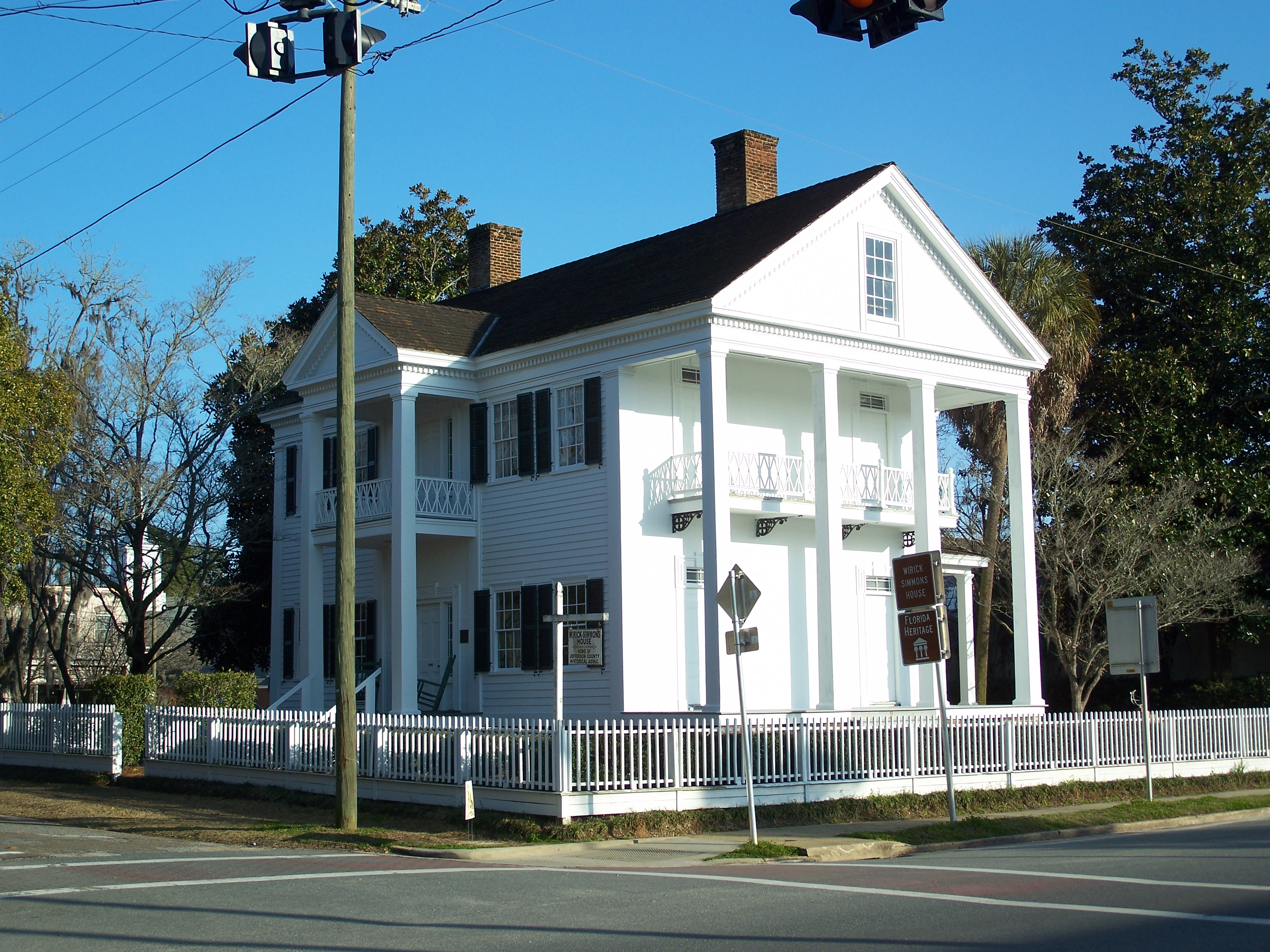

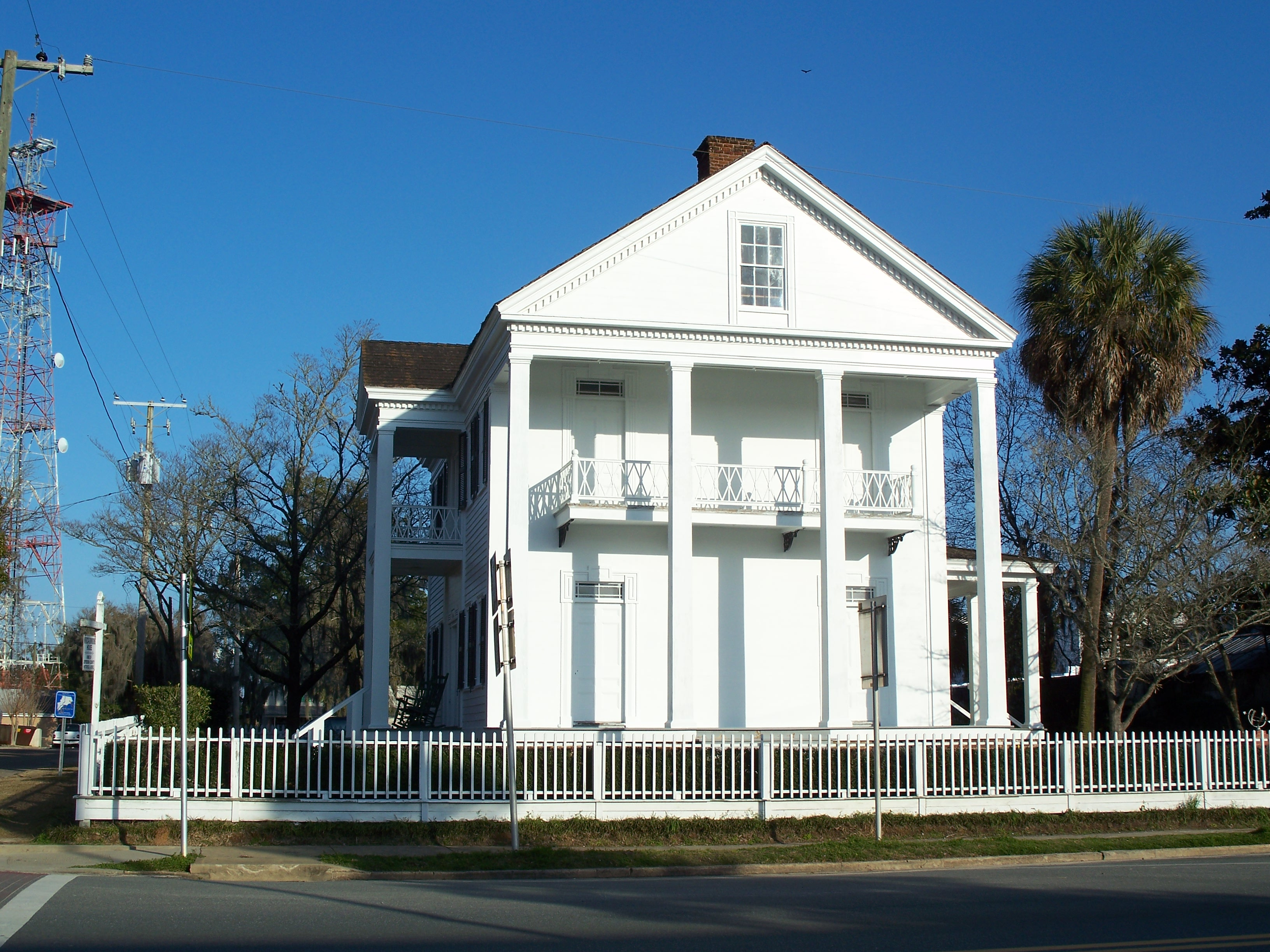
