= Jefferson County Jail (Monticello, Florida) =

- U.S. National Register of Historic Places
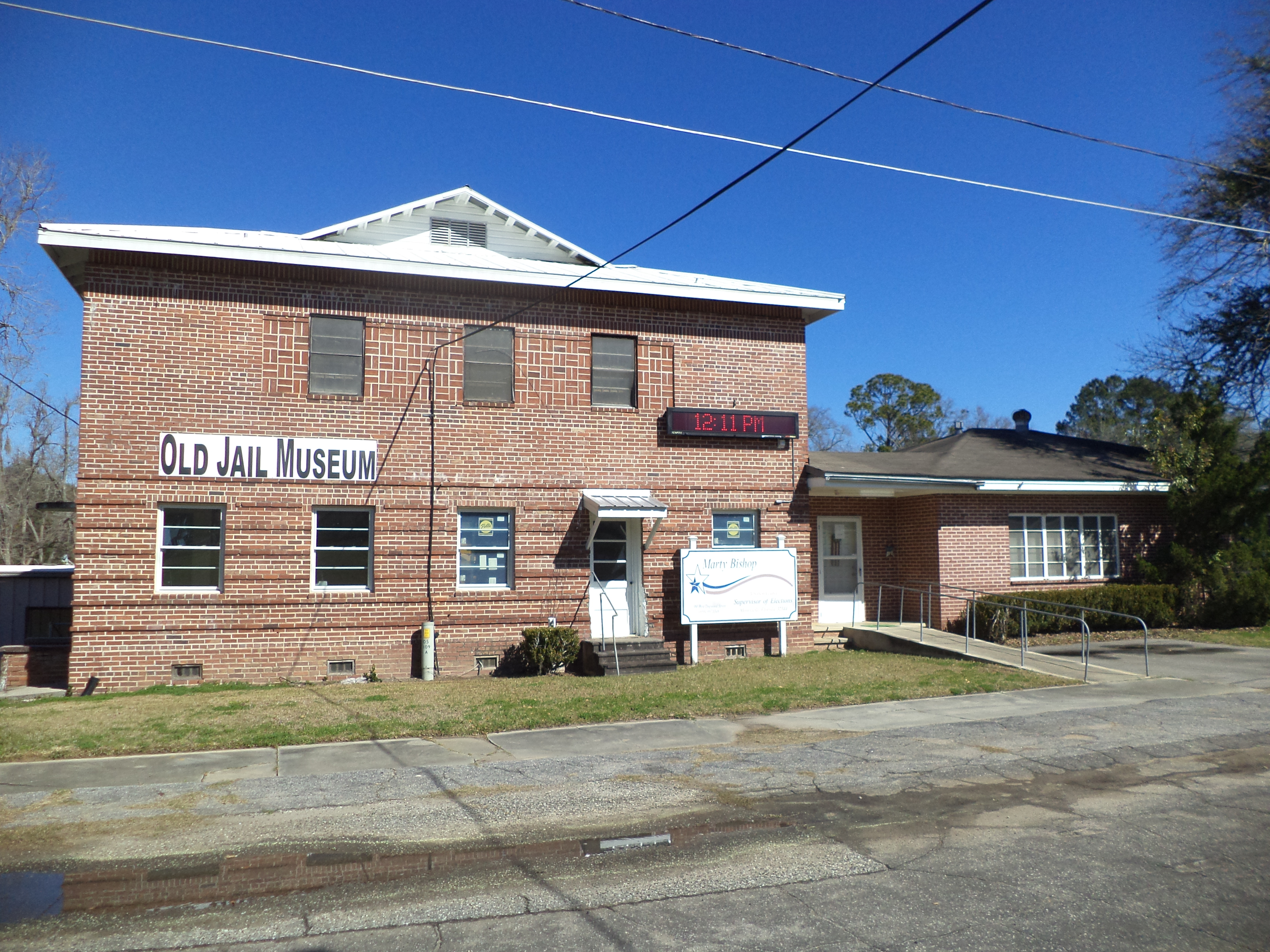

- Location within Florida Location within the United States
- Interactive map showing the location of Jefferson County Jail
- Location: Monticello, Florida
- Coordinates: 30°32′45″N 83°52′21″W
- NRHP reference No.: 13001072
- Added to NRHP: January 15, 2014

Jefferson County Jail is a national historic site located at 380 West Dogwood Street, Monticello, Florida in Jefferson County. The Masonry Vernacular building was constructed in 1909, with alterations in 1940 and 1960.

The design is typical for small jails of the early twentieth century: on the first floor there are the living quarters for the sheriff or deputy and his family, and on the second floor there are the steel cages for the inmates.

It was added to the National Register of Historic Places on January 15, 2014.

The building is under restoration and is now operated as the Monticello Old Jail Museum by Main Street of Monticello, Florida, Inc.
