= Lloyd Historic District =

Historic district in Florida, United States

- U.S. National Register of Historic Places
- U.S. Historic district
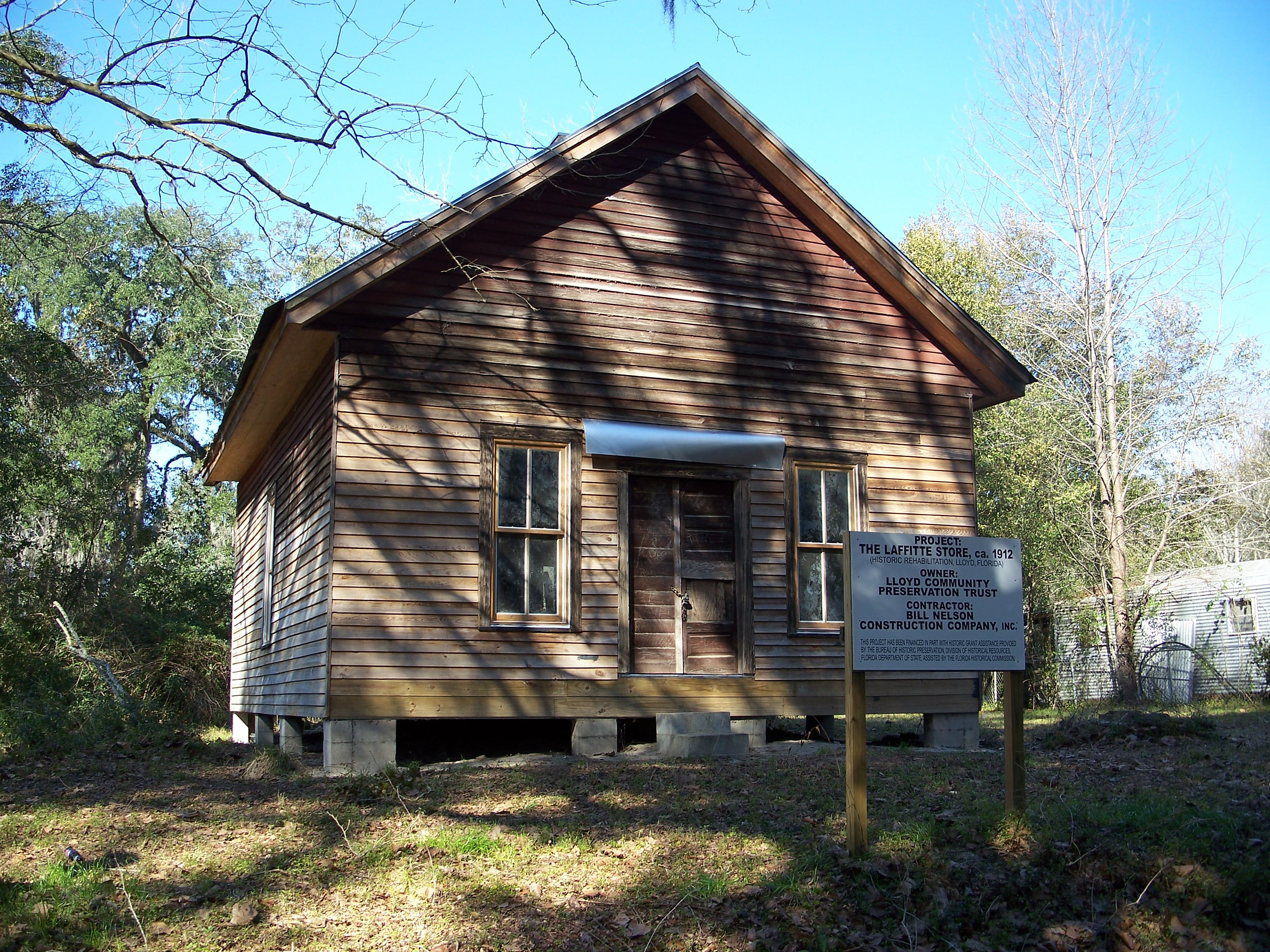
- House in the district being renovated

- Location within Florida Location within the United States
- Location: Lloyd, Florida
- Coordinates: 30°28′43″N 84°1′25″W
- Area: 250 acres (1.0 km^{2})
- Built: c. 1840-1920
- Architectural style: Frame Vernacular, some with Classical elements
- NRHP reference No.: 91001374; 02000710 (decrease)

Significant dates
- Added to NRHP: September 5, 1991
- Boundary decrease: June 27, 2002

The Lloyd Historic District is a U.S. historic district (designated as such on September 5, 1991) located in Lloyd, Florida. The district runs roughly along Main Street north of Bond Street and Bond east of Main. It contains 18 buildings.

On June 27, 2002, a decrease in the district's boundary was implemented.
