= Palmer-Perkins House =

Historic house in Florida, United States

- U.S. National Register of Historic Places
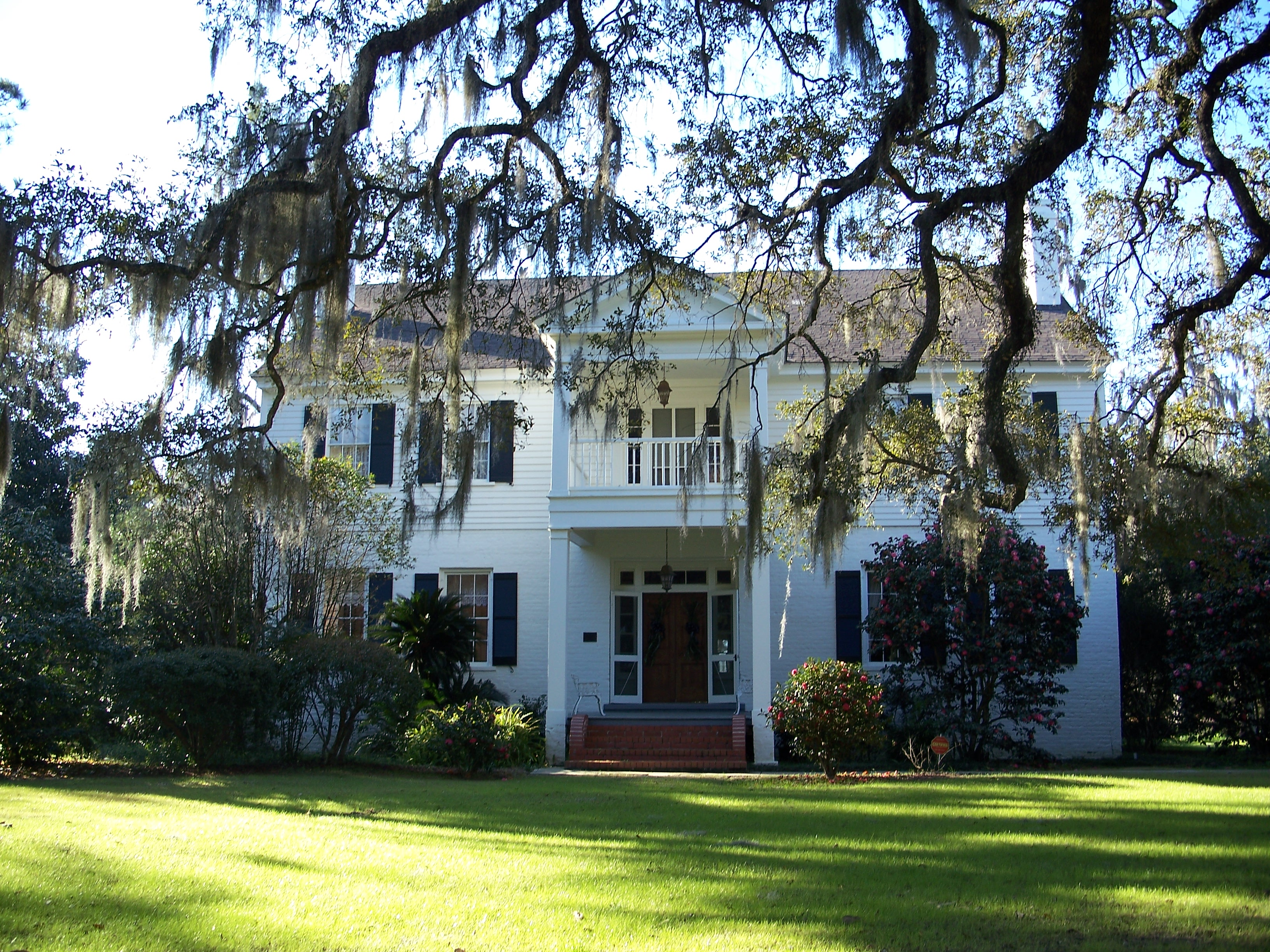

- Location within Florida Location within the United States
- Location: Monticello, Florida
- Coordinates: 30°32′38″N 83°52′30″W
- Built: c. 1836
- Architectural style: Greek Revival, Classical Revival
- NRHP reference No.: 79000674 (original); 86000466 (increase)

Significant dates
- Added to NRHP: July 10, 1979
- Boundary increase: March 18, 1986

The Palmer-Perkins House is a historic home in Monticello, Florida. It is located at 625 West Palmer Mill Road. On July 10, 1979, it was added to the U.S. National Register of Historic Places.

On March 18, 1986, there was a boundary increase to this site, also referred to as the Palmer-Perkins House and Palmer Family Graveyard. It extended the listing to 185 West Washington Street.

== Gallery ==
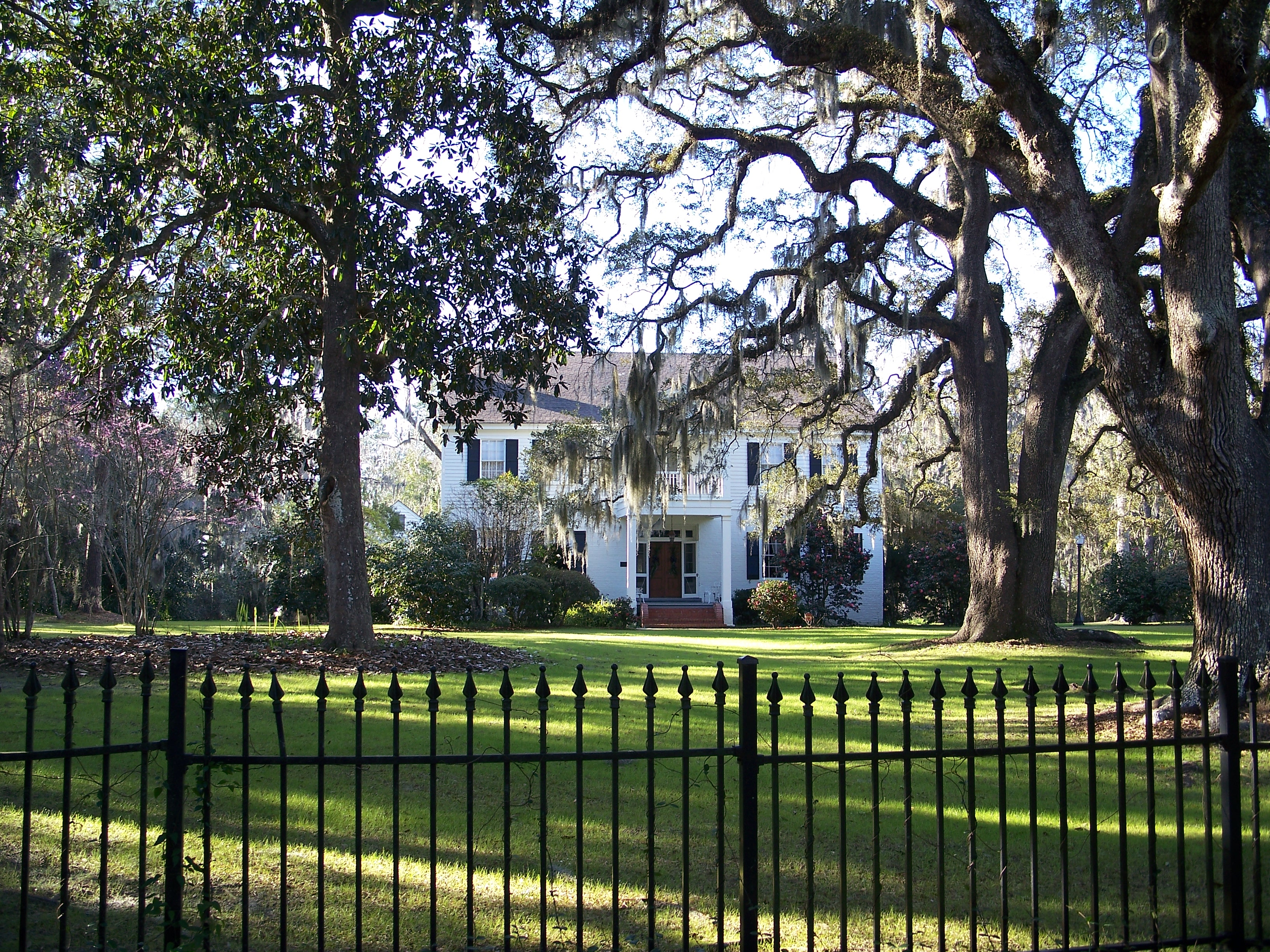

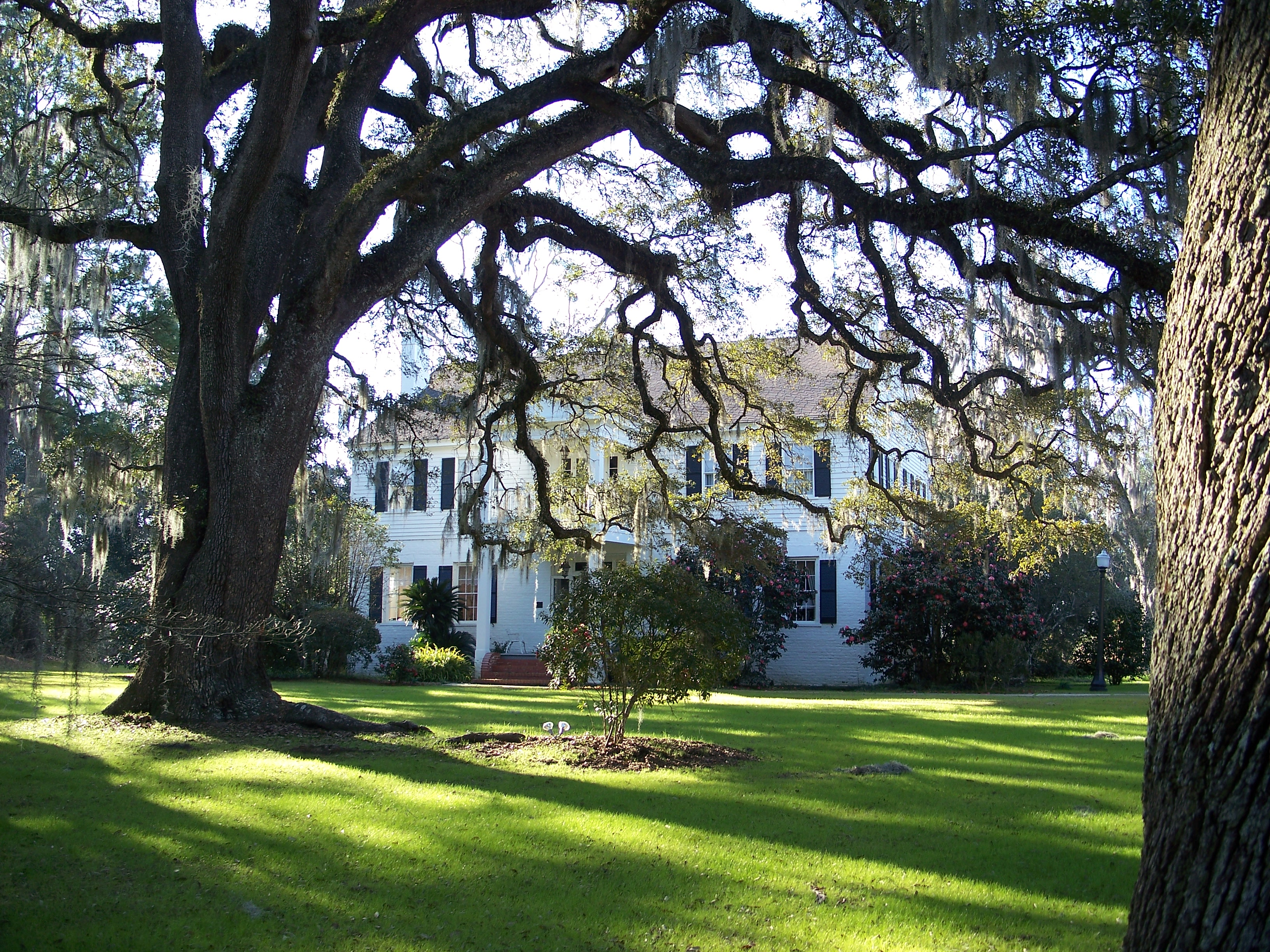
