= Denham-Lacy House =

Historic house in Florida, United States

- U.S. National Register of Historic Places
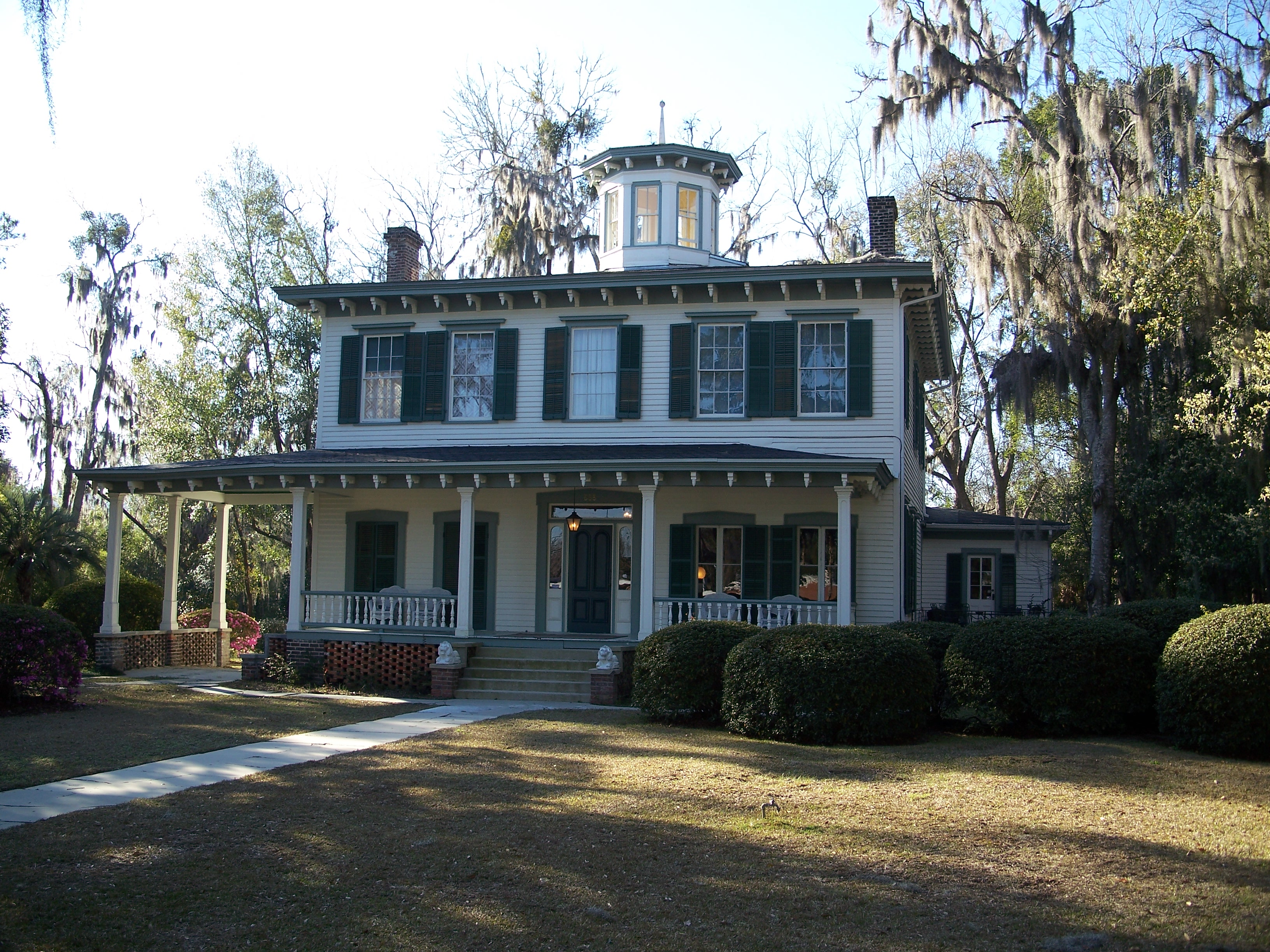

- Location within Florida Location within the United States
- Location: 555 Palmer Mill Rd., Monticello, Florida
- Coordinates: 30°32′36″N 83°52′25″W
- Area: less than one acre
- Built: 1874+
- Architectural style: Italianate
- NRHP reference No.: 82002376
- Added to NRHP: May 6, 1982

The Denham-Lacy House is a historic Inn located in Monticello, Florida.

== Description and history ==
It is one of three Italianate-style structures in Monticello. On May 6, 1982, it was added to the U.S. National Register of Historic Places. Restoration of the property was undertaken by its sixth successive owner, Patricia Hays Inmon, in 2000. The house currently operates as a six-room bed and breakfast Inn. The House has been restored to as original as possible with original colors and preserved plaster. All rooms are their original size and configuration. The grounds have many historic plantings.

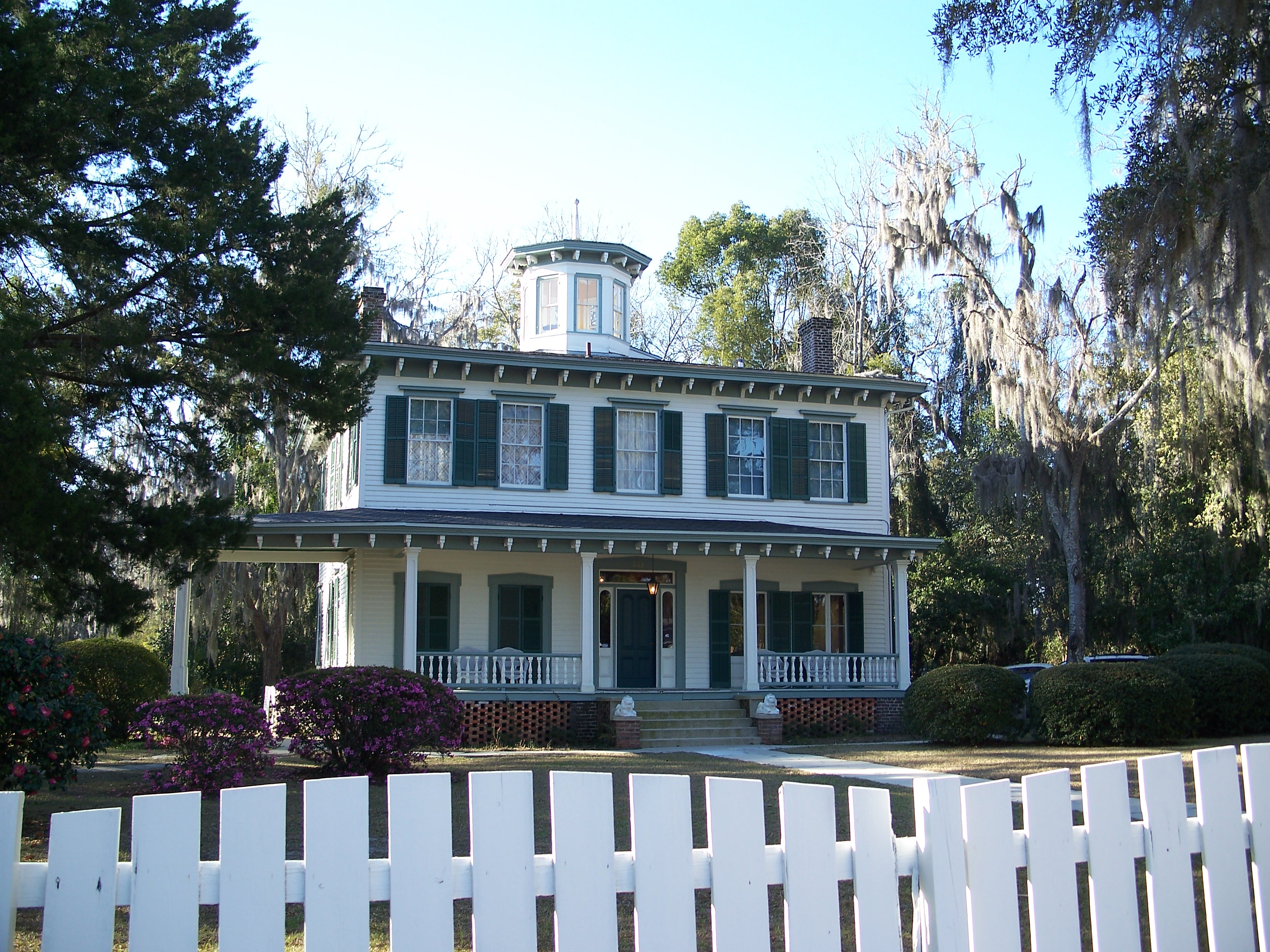
