= Palmer House (Monticello, Florida) =

Historic house in Florida, United States

- U.S. National Register of Historic Places
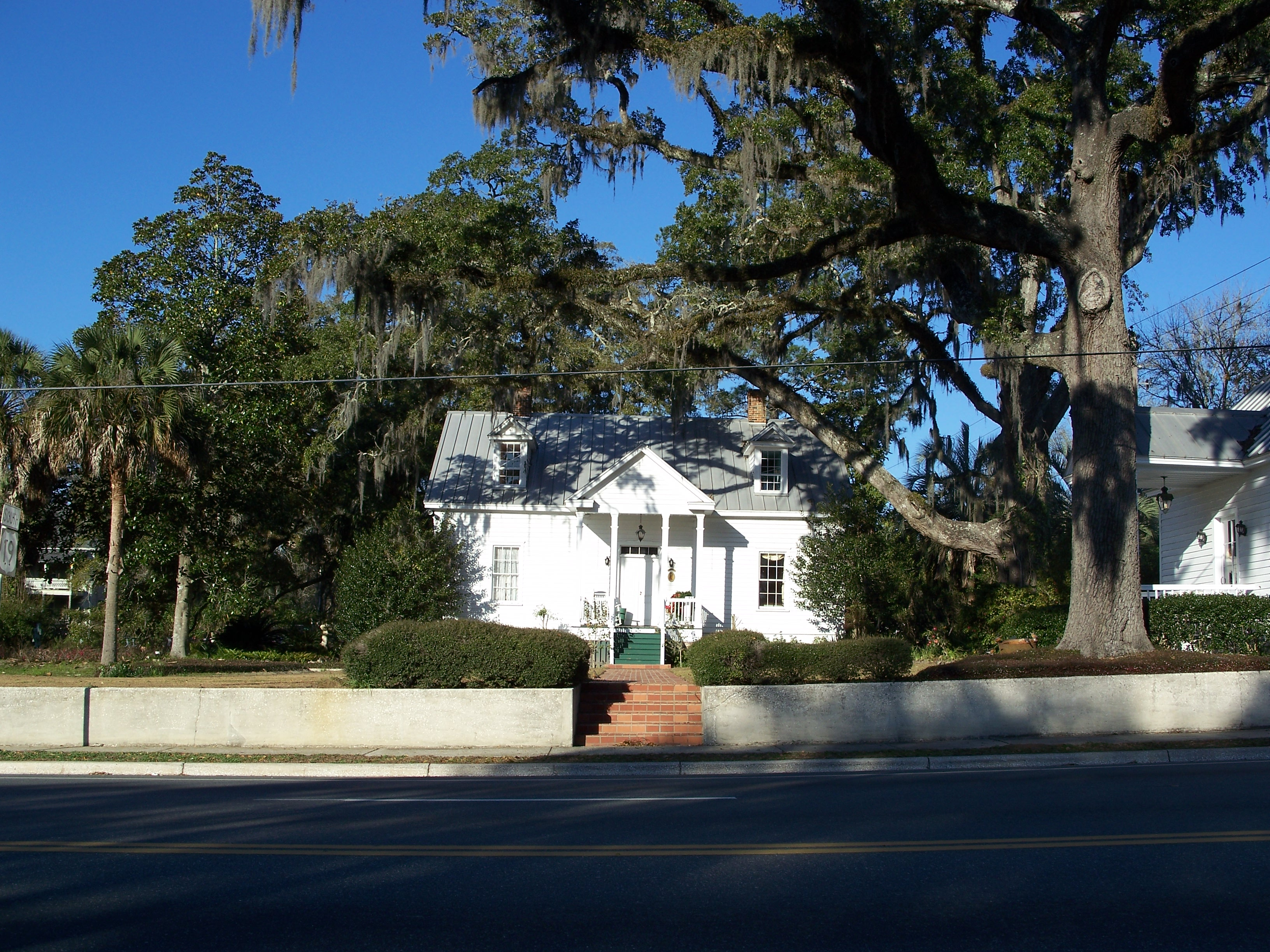

- Location within Florida Location within the United States
- Location: Monticello, Florida
- Coordinates: 30°32′38″N 83°52′14″W
- Built: c. 1867
- Architectural style: Classical Revival
- NRHP reference No.: 78000947
- Added to NRHP: November 21, 1978

The Palmer House is a historic home in Monticello, Florida, United States. It is located at Palmer Mill Road and South Jefferson Street. On November 21, 1978, it was added to the U.S. National Register of Historic Places.

== Gallery ==
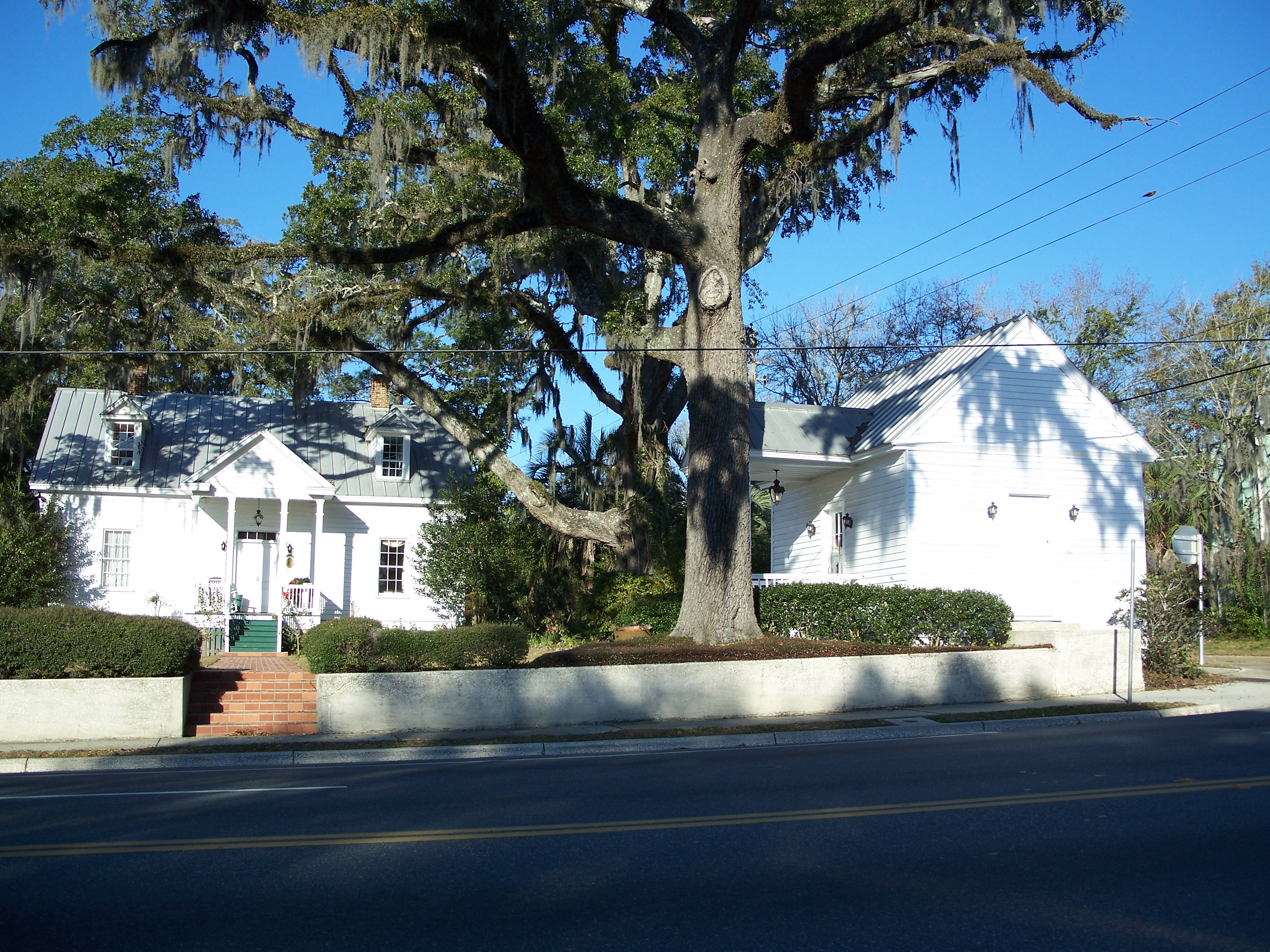
