= San Juan de Aspalaga =

- U.S. National Register of Historic Places
- Location within Florida Location within the United States
- Location: Jefferson County, Florida
- Nearest city: Wacissa
- Coordinates: 30.36°N 83.99°W
- NRHP reference No.: 73000581
- Added to NRHP: May 7, 1973

San Juan de Aspalaga was a mission in the Apalachee Province of Spanish Florida established by Franciscans. It first appears in Spanish records in 1655, when it was located at a distance of 86 leagues from St. Augustine (the capital of Spanish Florida), which would place it in the western part of Apalachee Province. By 1675, Aspalaga had moved eastward to the archaeological site known as the Pine Tuft Site, near the present-day town of Wacissa, Florida, about 78 leagues from St. Augustine. By 1695, or at least by 1697, Aspagala had moved back to the western part of Apalachee Province. Aspagala had a population of about 800 in 1675, which had fallen to 250 by 1689. Aspalaga was overrun on June 24, 1704, by Muscogees allied with the Province of Carolina, part of the Apalachee massacre.

The site where the mission stood was added to the U.S. National Register of Historic Places on May 7, 1973.

== See also ==
- Spanish missions in Florida
