= Turnbull-Ritter House =

Historic house in Florida, United States

- U.S. National Register of Historic Places
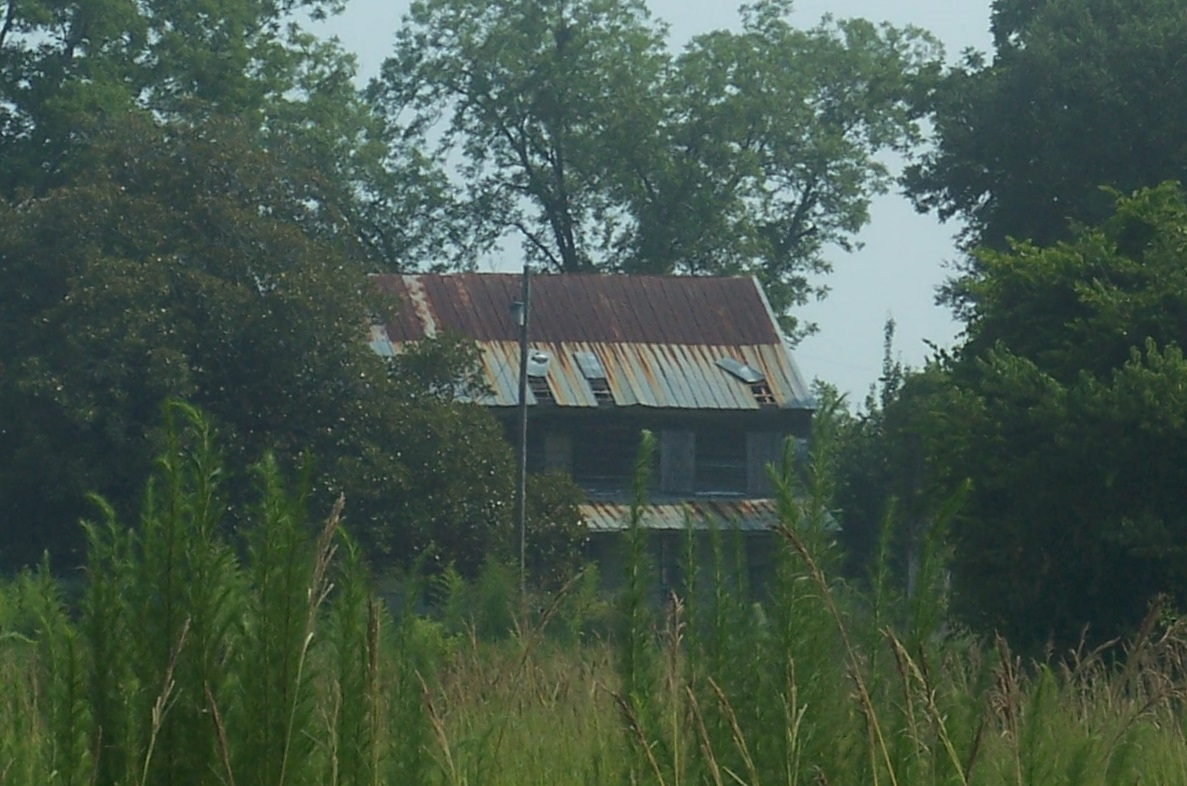

- Location within Florida Location within the United States
- Location: Jefferson County, Florida
- Nearest city: Lamont
- Coordinates: 30°28′28″N 83°54′18″W
- Area: 10 acres (4.0 ha)
- Built: c. 1856
- Architectural style: Greek Revival
- NRHP reference No.: 79000673
- Added to NRHP: July 18, 1979

The Turnbull-Ritter House (also known as the Sunrise Plantation) is a historic house located northwest of Lamont, Florida, off U.S. 19.

== Description and history ==
The 2 1/2-story Classical Revival style house was built around 1856. It was added to the National Register of Historic Places on July 18, 1979.
