= Monticello, Florida =

- City
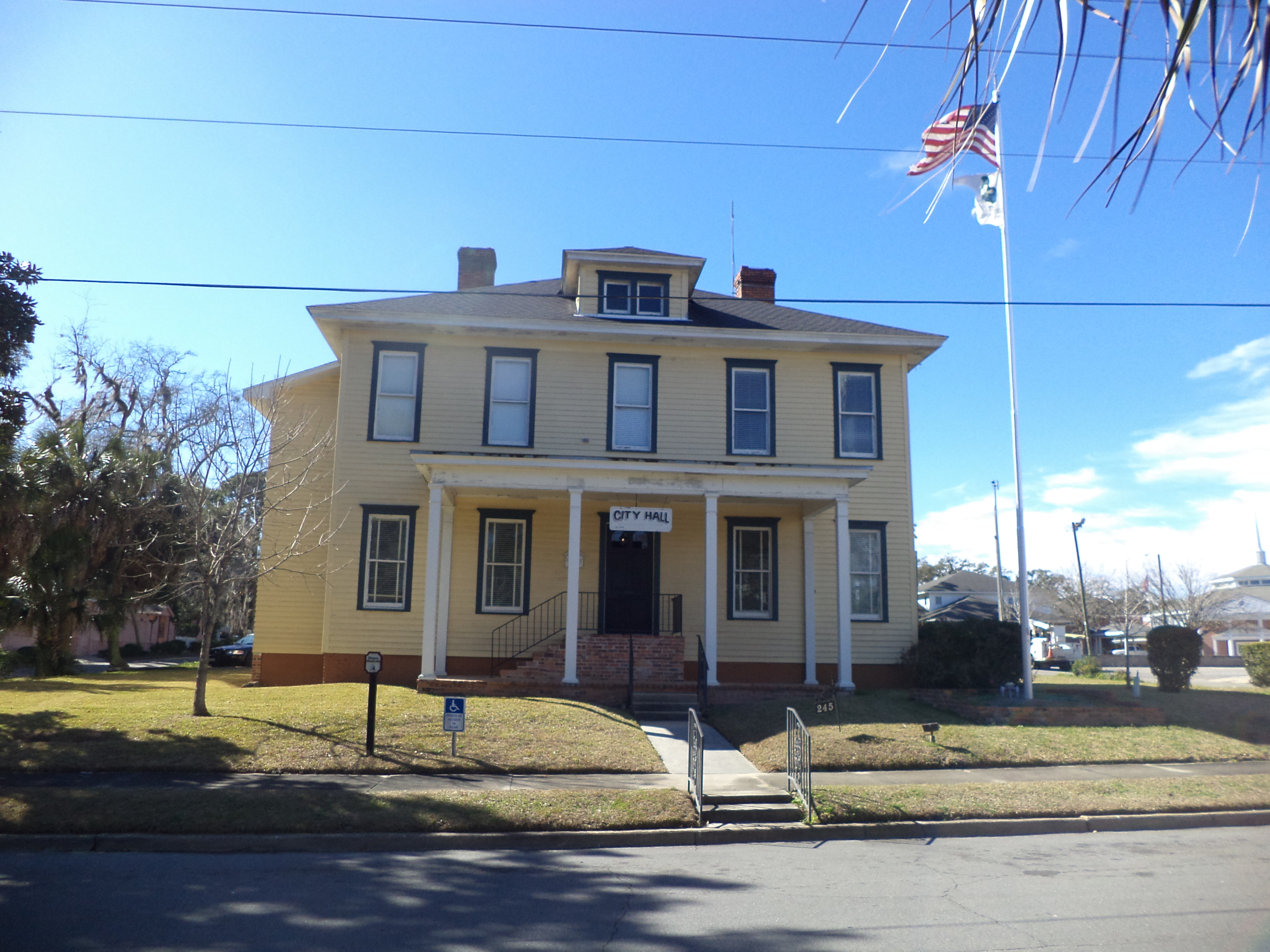
- Monticello City Hall

- Location in Jefferson County and the state of Florida
- Coordinates: 30°32′41″N 83°52′2″W
- Country: United States
- State: Florida
- County: Jefferson
- Settled: 1827
- Incorporated: 1859

Government
  - Type: Commission-Manager
  - Mayor: John Jones
  - Vice Mayor: Katrina Richardson
  - Commissioners: Gloria Cox; Brian Bachman; George Evans
  - City Manager: Steve Wingate
  - City Clerk and City Treasurer: Roosevelt Brooks

Area
  - Total: 4.01 sq mi (10.39 km^{2})
  - Land: 4.01 sq mi (10.39 km^{2})
  - Water: 0 sq mi (0.00 km^{2})
- Elevation: 233 ft (71 m)

Population (2020)
  - Total: 2,589
  - Density: 645.3/sq mi (249.17/km^{2})
- Time zone: UTC-5 (Eastern (EST))
  - Summer (DST): UTC-4 (EDT)
- ZIP codes: 32344-32345
- Area code(s): 850, 448
- FIPS code: 12-46500
- GNIS feature ID: 0287080
- Website: www.cityofmonticello.us

Monticello (/ˌmɒntɪˈsɛloʊ/ MON-tiss-EL-oh) is the only city in and the county seat of Jefferson County, Florida, United States. The city is named after Monticello, the estate of the county's namesake, Thomas Jefferson, on which the Jefferson County Courthouse was modeled. The population was 2,589 at the 2020 census. It is part of the Tallahassee metropolitan area.

Monticello is home to Indian mounds and many historic buildings, including the Perkins Opera House and Monticello Old Jail Museum.

== History ==
The City of Monticello was first settled in 1827, while it was still part of the Florida Territory, and was officially incorporated as a municipality in 1859, 15 years after Florida was already admitted into the Union as a U.S. state.

The Perkins Opera House is a 19th-century mercantile building adapted for use as a theater. It regularly hosts musical performances and theater productions. The first-floor ballroom also holds receptions.

The Old Howard Academy was built in 1936, and served African American students, and is listed on the National Register of Historic Places in 2021. The former building is located on Mamie B. Scott Drive, named for Mamie B. Scott, the former supervisor of the Jeanes Fund for the county. In 1960 a school named Howard Academy for African American students was built in southeastern Monticello. Schools in Monticello integrated in 1967.

=== Historic sites ===
- Bethel School
- Christ Episcopal Church
- Denham-Lacy House
- Jefferson County Courthouse
- Letchworth Mounds
- Lyndhurst Plantation
- Monticello High School
- Monticello Historic District
- Monticello Old Jail Museum
- Old Howard Academy
- Palmer House
- Palmer-Perkins House
- Perkins Opera House
- Wirick-Simmons House

== Geography ==
Monticello is located in northern Jefferson County at 30°32′41″N 83°52′02″W.

U.S. Route 90 runs through the center of the city as Washington Street, leading east 16 miles (26 km) to Greenville and west 26 miles (42 km) to Tallahassee. U.S. Route 19 passes through the city center on Jefferson Street, leading south 10 miles (16 km) to Capps and north 22 miles (35 km) to Thomasville, Georgia. The two highways meet in the center of Monticello at Courthouse Circle, which surrounds the Jefferson County Courthouse. US-19 leads south from the courthouse 5 miles (8 km) to Interstate 10 at Exit 225. I-10 leads west 25 miles (40 km) to Tallahassee and east 82 miles (132 km) to Lake City.

According to the United States Census Bureau, the city has a total area of 4.0 square miles (10.3 km^{2}), all land.

== Climate ==
The climate in this area is characterized by hot, humid summers and generally mild winters. According to the Köppen climate classification, the City of Monticello has a humid subtropical climate (Cfa). Monticello is the site of the highest temperature recorded in Florida, 109 °F (43 °C) on June 29, 1931.

Climate data for Monticello 5 SE, Florida, 1991–2020 normals, extremes 1904–2017
Month	Jan	Feb	Mar	Apr	May	Jun	Jul	Aug	Sep	Oct	Nov	Dec	Year
Record high °F (°C)	85 (29)	88 (31)	92 (33)	95 (35)	106 (41)	109 (43)	107 (42)	104 (40)	103 (39)	99 (37)	91 (33)	84 (29)	109 (43)
Mean daily maximum °F (°C)	62.7 (17.1)	67.1 (19.5)	73.3 (22.9)	79.1 (26.2)	85.7 (29.8)	89.6 (32.0)	90.7 (32.6)	90.1 (32.3)	87.2 (30.7)	80.3 (26.8)	71.4 (21.9)	65.1 (18.4)	78.5 (25.8)
Daily mean °F (°C)	51.5 (10.8)	54.8 (12.7)	60.7 (15.9)	66.5 (19.2)	73.4 (23.0)	79.1 (26.2)	80.9 (27.2)	80.5 (26.9)	77.2 (25.1)	68.6 (20.3)	59.4 (15.2)	53.7 (12.1)	67.2 (19.6)
Mean daily minimum °F (°C)	40.3 (4.6)	42.5 (5.8)	48.1 (8.9)	53.9 (12.2)	61.1 (16.2)	68.6 (20.3)	71.0 (21.7)	70.9 (21.6)	67.2 (19.6)	56.9 (13.8)	47.5 (8.6)	42.4 (5.8)	55.9 (13.3)
Record low °F (°C)	3 (−16)	14 (−10)	18 (−8)	31 (−1)	38 (3)	44 (7)	54 (12)	58 (14)	36 (2)	28 (−2)	13 (−11)	7 (−14)	3 (−16)
Average precipitation inches (mm)	4.81 (122)	4.01 (102)	5.29 (134)	4.12 (105)	3.82 (97)	7.62 (194)	7.49 (190)	7.53 (191)	5.46 (139)	3.31 (84)	2.79 (71)	3.68 (93)	59.93 (1,522)
Average precipitation days (≥ 0.01 in)	9.1	7.4	9.2	6.4	5.8	11.7	15.0	13.2	8.7	5.0	5.8	7.7	105.0
Source 1: NOAA
Source 2: WRCC (extremes)

== Demographics ==
Historical population
Census	Pop.	Note	%±
1850	329		—
1860	1,083		229.2%
1870	1,052		−2.9%
1890	1,218		—
1900	1,076		−11.7%
1910	1,829		70.0%
1920	1,704		−6.8%
1930	1,901		11.6%
1940	2,042		7.4%
1950	2,264		10.9%
1960	2,490		10.0%
1970	2,473		−0.7%
1980	2,994		21.1%
1990	2,573		−14.1%
2000	2,533		−1.6%
2010	2,506		−1.1%
2020	2,589		3.3%
U.S. Decennial Census

=== Racial and ethnic composition ===
Monticello city, Florida – Racial and ethnic composition Note: the US Census treats Hispanic/Latino as an ethnic category. This table excludes Latinos from the racial categories and assigns them to a separate category. Hispanics/Latinos may be of any race.
Race / ethnicity (NH = Non-Hispanic)	Pop 2000	Pop 2010	Pop 2020	% 2000	% 2010	% 2020
White (NH)	1,175	1,058	1,208	46.39%	42.22%	46.66%
Black or African American (NH)	1,285	1,349	1,242	50.73%	53.83%	47.97%
Native American or Alaska Native (NH)	3	0	5	0.12%	0.00%	0.19%
Asian (NH)	15	17	7	0.59%	0.68%	0.27%
Pacific Islander or Native Hawaiian (NH)	2	0	3	0.08%	0.00%	0.12%
Other race (NH)	0	0	5	0.00%	0.00%	0.19%
Mixed race or Multiracial (NH)	20	29	70	0.79%	1.16%	2.70%
Hispanic or Latino (any race)	33	53	49	1.30%	2.11%	1.89%
Total	2,533	2,506	2,589	100.00%	100.00%	100.00%

=== 2020 census ===
As of the 2020 census, Monticello had a population of 2,589. The median age was 48.5 years. 19.0% of residents were under the age of 18 and 25.8% of residents were 65 years of age or older. For every 100 females there were 86.4 males, and for every 100 females age 18 and over there were 81.2 males age 18 and over.

0.0% of residents lived in urban areas, while 100.0% lived in rural areas.

There were 1,114 households in Monticello, of which 25.6% had children under the age of 18 living in them. Of all households, 33.7% were married-couple households, 19.7% were households with a male householder and no spouse or partner present, and 41.9% were households with a female householder and no spouse or partner present. About 35.8% of all households were made up of individuals and 17.3% had someone living alone who was 65 years of age or older.

There were 1,323 housing units, of which 15.8% were vacant. The homeowner vacancy rate was 4.6% and the rental vacancy rate was 6.5%.

In 2020, the median household income was $43,780. 27.3% of the population 25 years and older had a bachelor's degree or higher. There was a 49.2% employment rate.

In the 2020 American Community Survey, there were 711 families residing in the city.

=== 2010 census ===
As of the 2010 United States census, there were 2,506 people, 770 households, and 559 families residing in the city.

== Notable people ==
- Lucy Alibar, Oscar-nominated screenwriter
- James Patton Anderson, commander of the 1st Florida Infantry Regiment during the American Civil War, lived in Monticello.
- Halsey Beshears, Secretary of Florida Department of Business and Professional Regulation
- Allen Boyd, politician
- Janegale Boyd, Democratic politician from the Florida House of Representatives
- William A. Cocke, attorney, politician and Florida Attorney General
- S. D. Clarke, attorney, bank president and legislator for 34 years including President of the Senate
- James A. Dallas, educator and civic leader
- Loomis Dean, Life Magazine photographer
- Joe Oscar Eaton, lawyer, senator and United States federal judge for 41 years
- Clemon Johnson, NBA player and Florida A&M University Basketball coach
- Colin Kelly, World War II hero bomber pilot
- Ryal Long, state legislator during the Reconstruction era
- Sam Madison, former Miami Dolphins player
- Gene McKinney, Sergeant Major of the Army
- Robert Meacham, Reconstruction era politician
- Zach Norton, Cincinnati Bearcats/Baltimore Ravens player
- William D. Puleston, Director of Naval Intelligence, U.S. Navy
- Tony Robinson, NFL player
- William Stewart Simkins, Law Professor University of Texas
- Billy Taylor, professional baseball pitcher
- Bobby Thigpen, Major League Baseball relief pitcher, set record for most saves in a season (57) in 1990, a record which stood for 18 years
- Ernest Ivy Thomas Jr., Marine Sergeant who helped raise the U.S. flag on Iwo Jima
- Tarlos Thomas, former Florida State Seminole and NFL offensive tackle
- Willie "Chicken" Thompson, celebrated mid-late 20th century Chicago White Sox clubhouse manager and chef
- Patti Townsend, All-American softball player and Tallahassee State College head softball coach
- Theodore Turnbull, lawyer, plantation owner and Florida state legislator who served as Speaker of the House and President of the Senate.
- Wildman Steve, comic entertainer
- Robert Wilson, NFL player
- Jack Youngblood, professional football player

== Education ==
Jefferson County Schools operates public schools, including Jefferson County Middle / High School. and Jefferson County Elementary school (it's a K-12 school) from a joint campus at 50 David Road, south of Monticello.
