= Bethel School (Monticello, Florida) =

- U.S. National Register of Historic Places
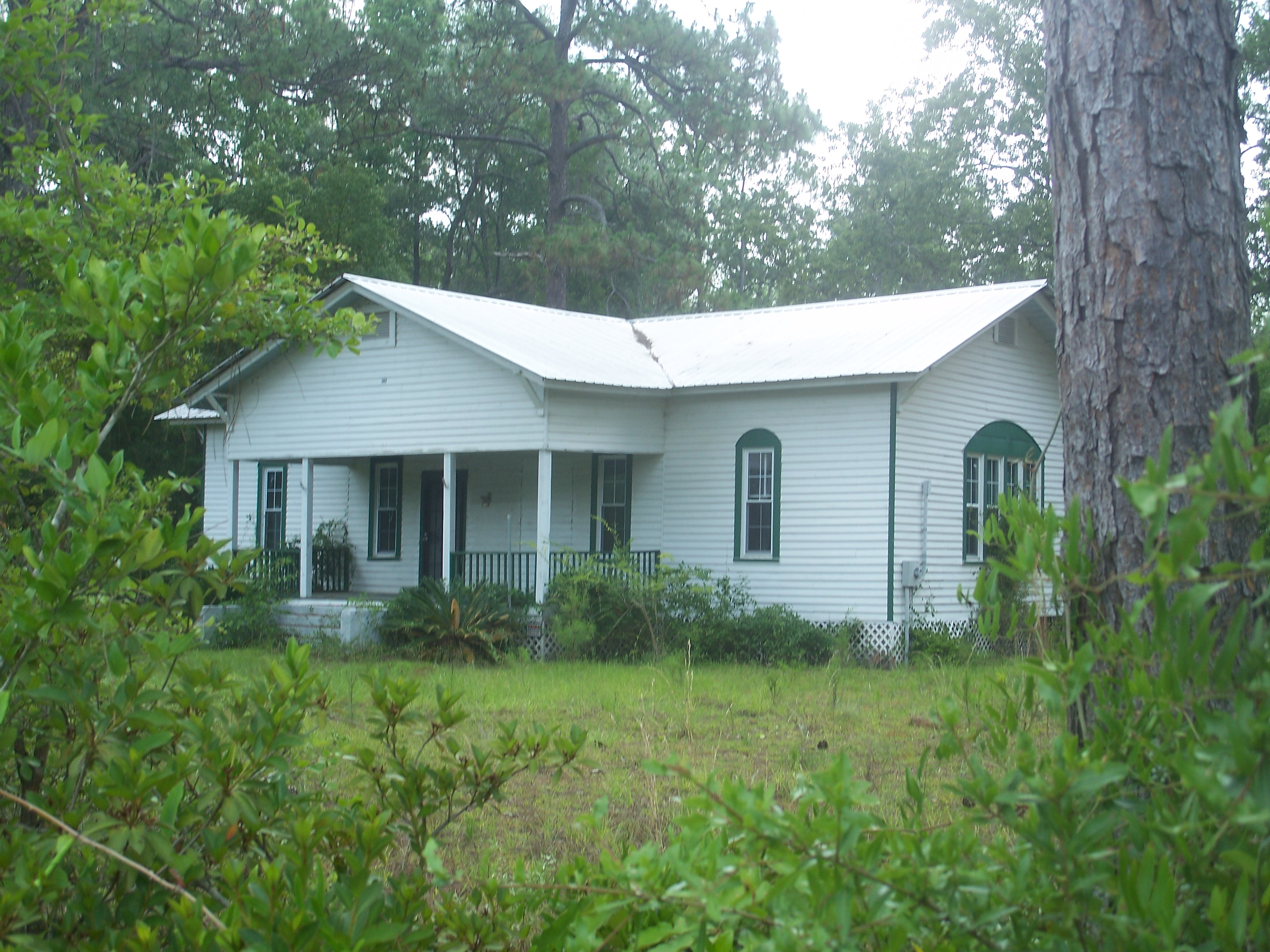

- Location within Florida
- Location: Monticello, Florida, U.S.
- Coordinates: 30°36′49″N 83°50′16″W
- Architectural style: Frame Vernacular
- NRHP reference No.: 01001084
- Added to NRHP: October 12, 2001

The Bethel School is a historic school building in Jefferson County, Florida, with a Monticello postal address. It is located on County Road 149. It was added to the U.S. National Register of Historic Places on October 12, 2001.

In 1903, Thomas S. and Mary H. Johnson donated one acre of their property across from the Methodist Church to the school board for educational uses. The building is a rectangular, frame vernacular building that was built in 1903, sitting on a brick pier foundation. The building operated as a school until 1946.
