= Kinhega Lodge =

Coordinates: 30.581°N 84.226°W

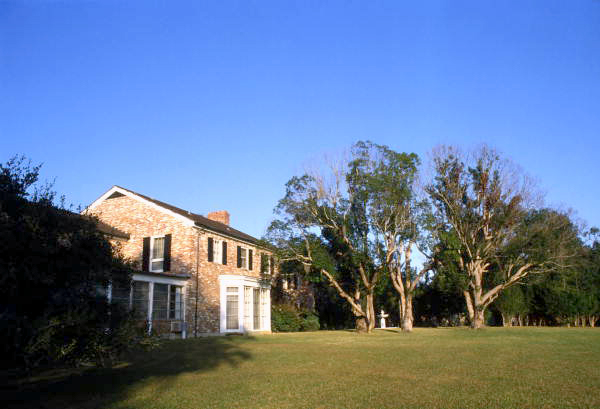
Kinhega Lodge in Tallahassee, between 1969 and 1985

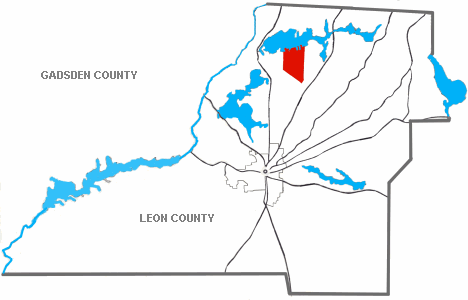
Location of Kinhega Lodge in 1967

Kinhega Lodge was a hunting and fishing plantation located in northern Leon County, Florida, United States on Lake Iamonia.

From the 1830s through 1866 the land was part of the cotton plantation known as Water Oak Plantation owned by Richard Bradford.

== Horseshoe Plantation ==
In 1901, Clement A. Griscom, a businessman and shipping magnate from Philadelphia whose family gained much wealth after the American Civil War with the American Line and Red Star Line purchased 978 acres (396 ha) and plantation house in the horseshoe bend of Lake Iamonia for $5300 (~$159,101 in 2024) from R. E. Lester, the son of Capt. William Lester of Oaklawn Plantation.

From 1902 through 1903 Griscom purchased land from heirs of Burgesstown Plantation, the Whitehead family, and many other owners retaining the name of Horseshoe Plantation. The plantation eventually was more than 10,000 acres (4,000 ha) in size with over 25 mi (40 km) of woodland drives.

When Clement A. Griscom died on October 19, 1916, Horseshoe Plantation was divided up and part sold. Lloyd C. Griscom received 4,000 acres (1,600 ha) on the west side naming it Luna Plantation while Frances C. Griscom, a sportswoman, received 7,000 acres (2,800 ha) of the old plantation to the east and named it Water Oak Plantation. Frances Griscom was the 1900 United States Women's Amateur Golf Champion.

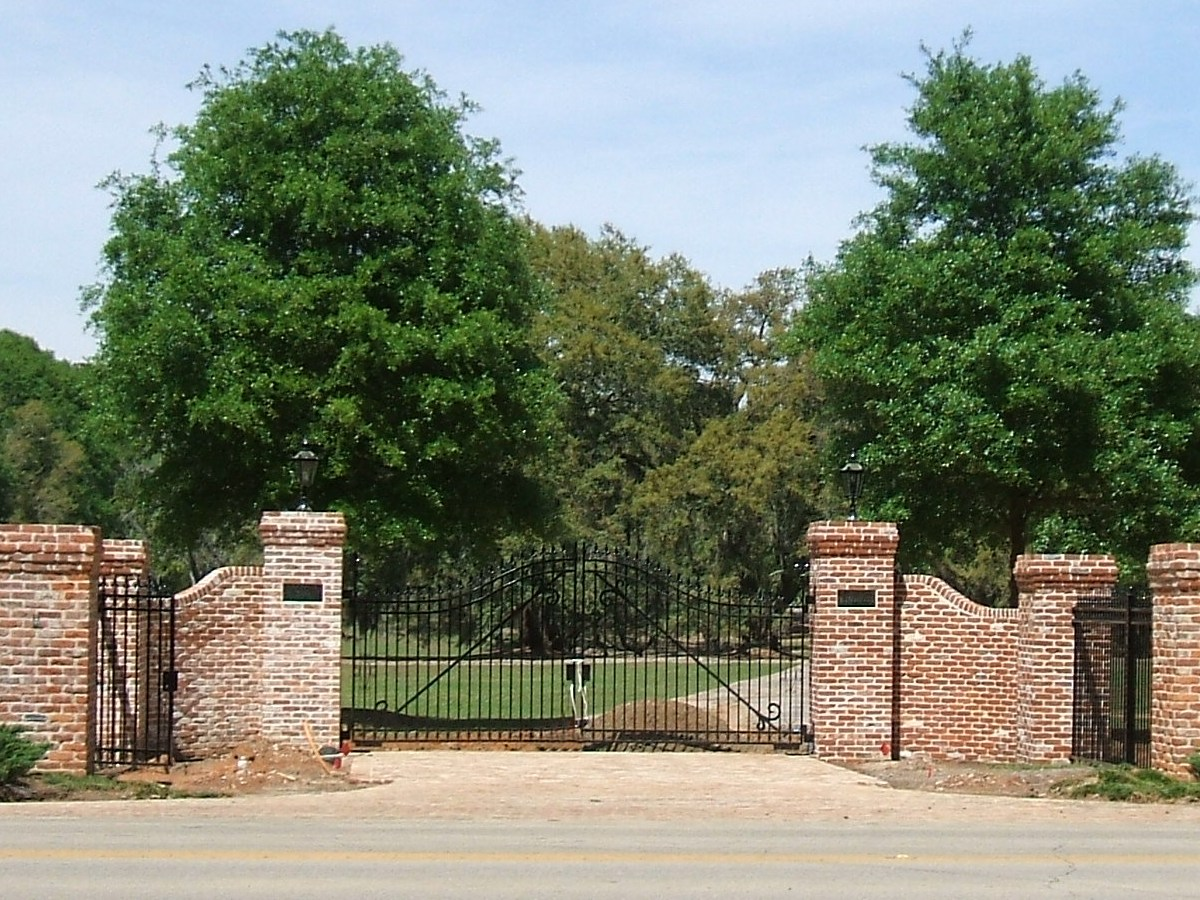
Entrance to Kinhega Lodge

== Becoming Kinhega ==
In 1951 Frances Griscom sold a large part of Water Oak Plantation to J.C. (Bull) Headley, a recent transplanted from Kentuckian. Griscom retained Water Oak with a few hundred acres of land. Headley turned his property into Bull Run Plantation, a luxurious farm which grew in agricultural output. Headley ran several hundred head of cattle and continued with operations as a hunting plantation.

In 1964 Headley sold his hunting lodge and 3,700 acres (1,500 ha) to Gillis Long, a Congressman from Louisiana and assistant secretary of the Office of Economic Opportunity under President Lyndon Johnson. A group of hunters, golfers, and fishing enthusiasts also got involved and the property became Kinhega Lodge. The lodge was more a water fowl and fishing lodge and supplied members with four man-made lakes, including nearby Lake Monkey Business, a 90 acres (36 ha) lake for ducks, plus Lake Iamonia. Though some quail hunting took place, it was not as prevalent as the quail hunting plantations nearby.

In 1963 Kinhega was reorganized and took in members from Texas, Wisconsin, and New York among others. Membership was at 100 with Gillis Long still involved. Another prominent member was Jack Ladd, a vice-president of Holiday Inns of America in Memphis, Tennessee.

== Photo gallery ==
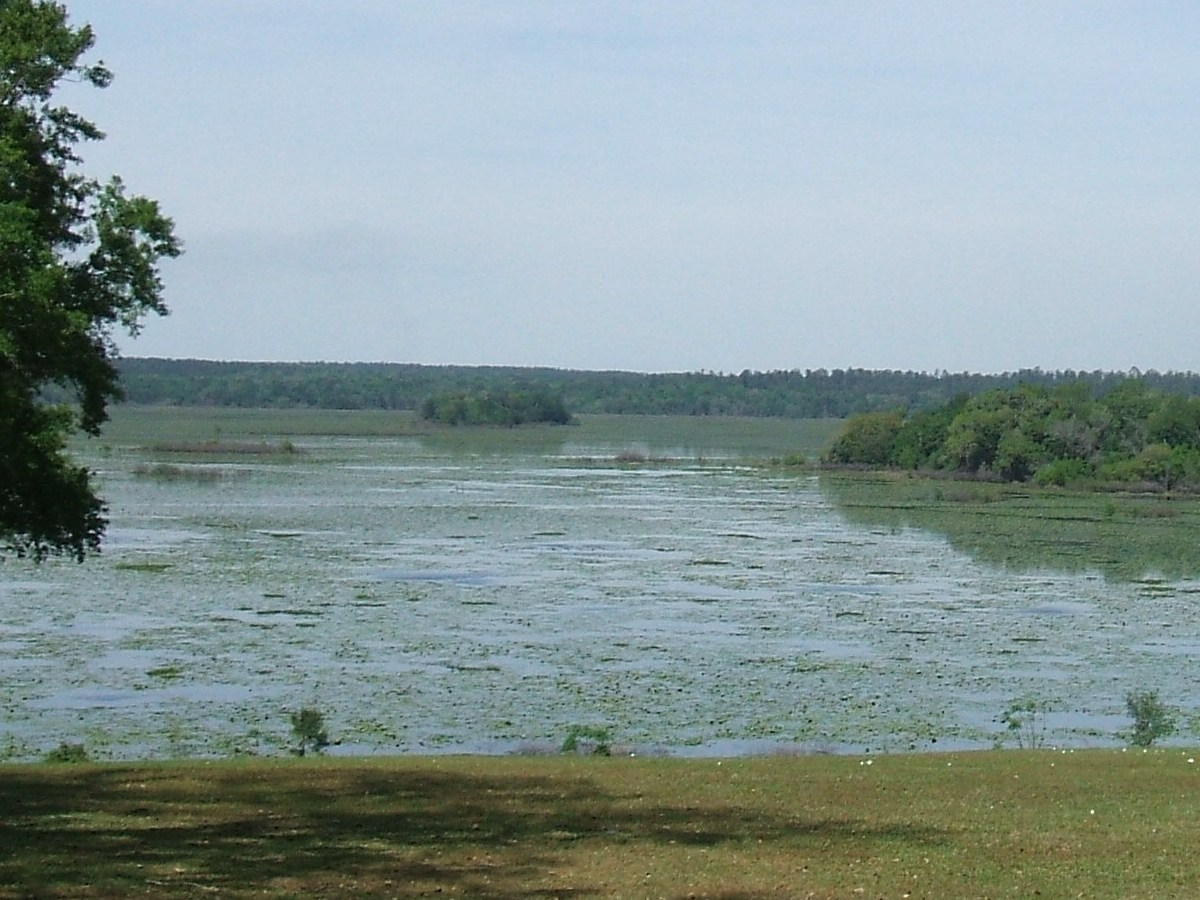
View of Lake Iamonia

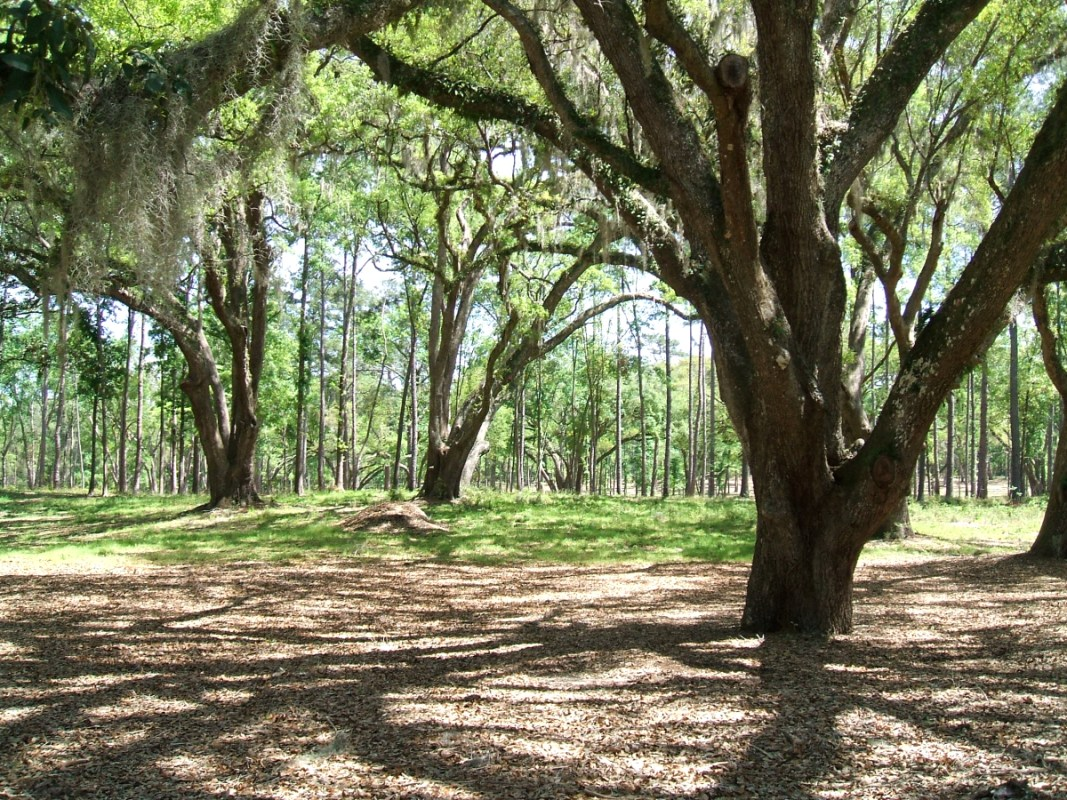
Live oaks at Kinega

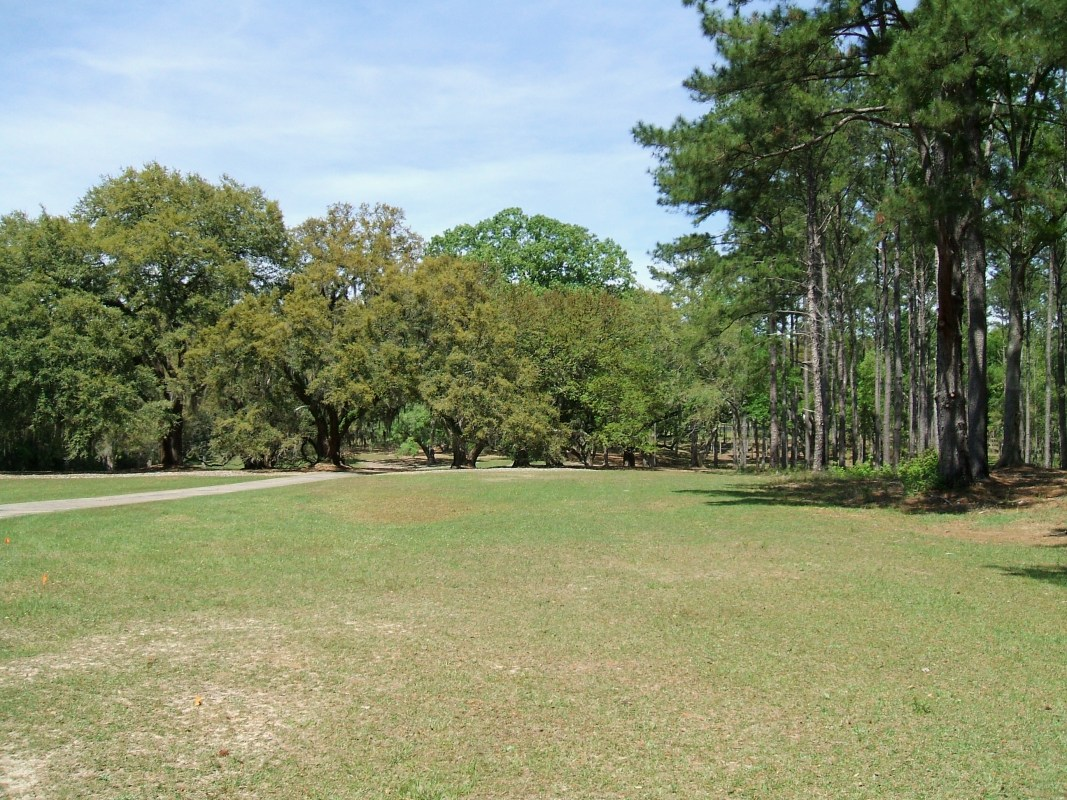
South lawn

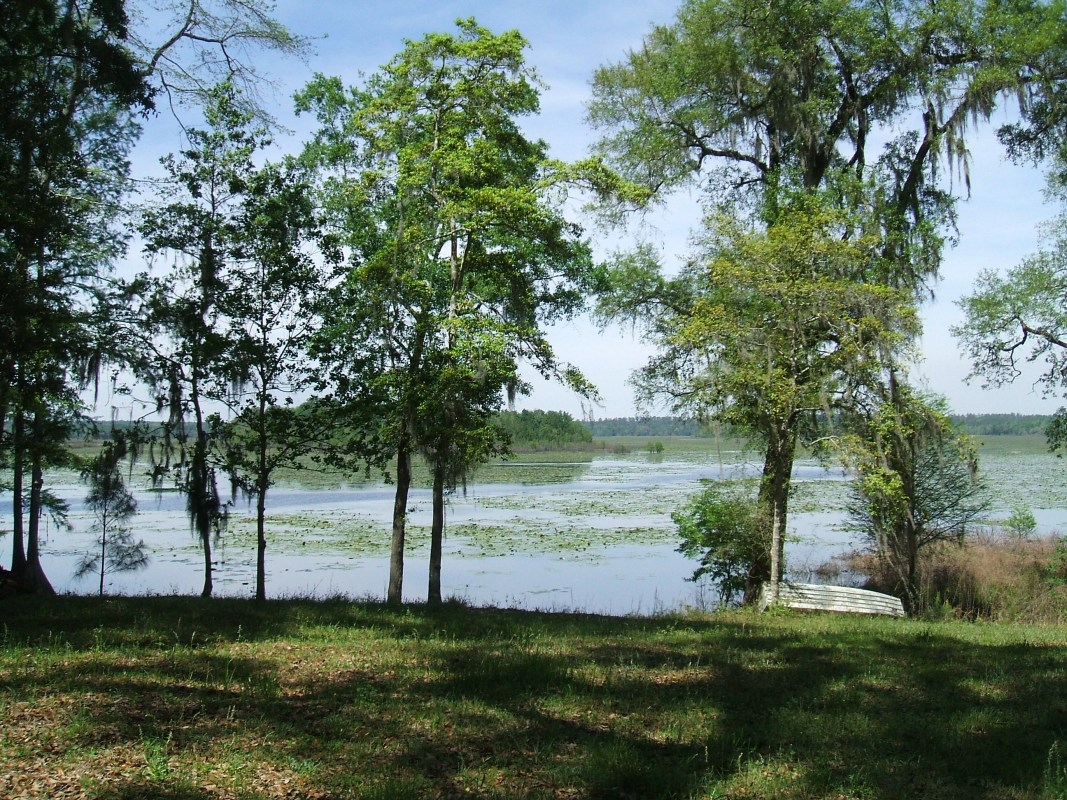
Lake view through trees

Adjacent plantations:

- Horseshoe Plantation to the east
- Luna Plantation to the west
- Ayavalla Plantation to the south

Kinega would eventually become Kinhega Lodge Estates, Limited. In the early 1970s the property sold again to investors who developed the property into Killearn Lakes Plantation, a development of 4,500 homes.
