= Horseshoe Plantation =

Place in Florida, United States of America

Coordinates: 30.6241°N 84.200187°W

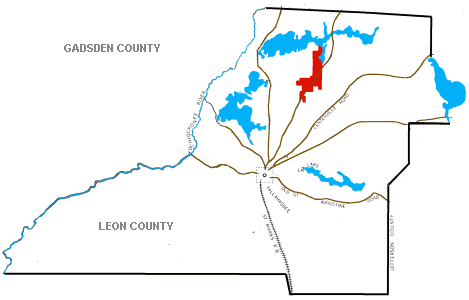
Location of Horseshoe Plantation in 1860

Horseshoe Plantation is an 11,000-acre (45 km^{2}) cotton-growing forced-labor farm located in northern Leon County, Florida and established around 1840 by Dr. Edward Bradford, a planter from Enfield, North Carolina.

It is currently owned and maintained by Frederic C. Hamilton.

== Plantation specifics ==
Also see Pine Hill Plantation

== The 1900s ==
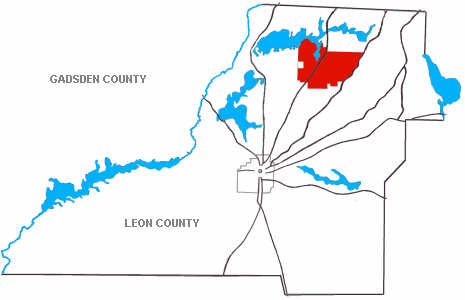
Location of Horseshoe Plantation in 1911

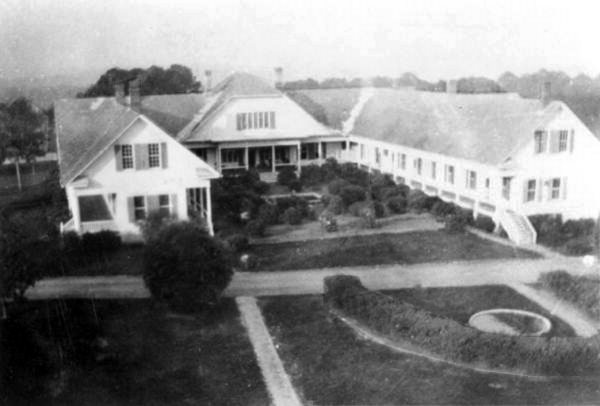
Horseshoe Plantation house

In 1901, Clement A. Griscom, a businessman and shipping magnate from Philadelphia whose family gained much wealth after the American Civil War purchased 978 acres (3.96 km^{2}) and plantation house in the horseshoe bend of Lake Iamonia for $5300 (~$159,101 in 2024) from R. E. Lester, the son of Capt. William Lester of Oaklawn Plantation. From 1902 through 1903 Griscom purchased land from heirs of Burgesstown Plantation, the Whitehead family, and many other owners retaining the "Horseshoe Plantation" name. The plantation eventually was more than 10,000 acres (4,000 ha) in size with over 25 miles (40 km) of woodland drives. The plantation house had a 700 ft (210 m) long piazza. Griscom, an owner and breeder of Jersey cattle on his Haverford, Pennsylvania farm, 'Dolobran,' brought 75 head to Horseshoe. Griscom also fancied pecans and had 75 acres (300,000 m^{2}) set aside for their cultivation. In 1911 There were 80 tenant farmer families at Horseshoe Plantation. One-third of Horseshoe was cultivated by these tenant farmers with 1,200 acres (4.9 km^{2}) in cotton and 1,500 acres (6.1 km^{2}) in corn. The remainder of the plantation was put to use for bobwhite quail.

On October 19, 1916, and after Clement Griscom's death, the eastern part of Horseshoe was sold to New Yorker George F. Baker, Jr. for $170,000. Baker was the son of George Fisher Baker, a wealthy financier and banker who was a financial associate of J. P. Morgan.

The western part of Horseshoe was divided into two separate plantations. Clement Grisom's son, Lloyd C. Griscom, established his 4,000 acres (1,600 ha) Luna Plantation, a winter residence in the east. It extended along the southern shores of Lake Iamonia westward to the Ochlockonee River. Frances C. Griscom, sister to Lloyd, established her Water Oak Plantation on the remaining 7,000 acres (2,800 ha) naming it for the antebellum plantation belonging to Richard H. Bradford.
