= Water Oak Plantation =

Cotton plantation in Florida, United States

Coordinates: 30.554°N 84.225°W

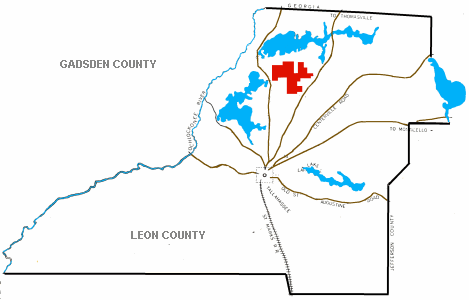
Location of Water Oak Plantation and Walnut Hill Plantation

Water Oak Plantation was a small forced labor farm growing cotton on 1,840 acres (740 ha) located in northern Leon County, Florida, United States established by Richard Bradford.

== Location ==
Water Oak was located in the general area of Bradfordville. Adjacent plantations:

- Pine Hill Plantation to the east
- Walnut Hill Plantation, Water Oak Plantation being very close to Walnut Hill

== Plantation specifics ==
The Leon County Florida 1860 Agricultural Census shows that Water Oak Plantation had the following:

- Improved Land: 900 acres (360 ha)
- Unimproved Land: 940 acres (380 ha)
- Cash value of plantation: $18,400
- Cash value of farm implements/machinery: $1500
- Cash value of farm animals: $3,500
- Number of slaves: 65
- Bushels of corn: 2500
- Bales of cotton: 130

== The founder ==
Richard Henry Bradford Sr. born November 15, 1800, in Enfield, North Carolina.

The Bradford brothers took turns hosting July 4 celebrations with massive barbecues for their slaves. When it was Richard's turn to host the celebration he included fishing parties on Lake Iamonia. No whites were allowed to attend these events.

During the Civil War, Richard Henry Bradford Jr. was captain of a company of the 1st Florida Regiment. He left with his regiment for Pensacola, Florida, in the fall of 1861. On the night of October 9, 1861, while leading an attack column in the assault on Federal positions during the Battle of Santa Rosa Island, on Santa Rosa Island, Florida, he was shot and killed by a sentinel of the 6th New York Volunteer Infantry. His body was returned for a hero’s funeral, and was buried in the cemetery at Pine Hill Plantation. He could well have been the first Floridian killed in Confederate action.

== The 1900s ==
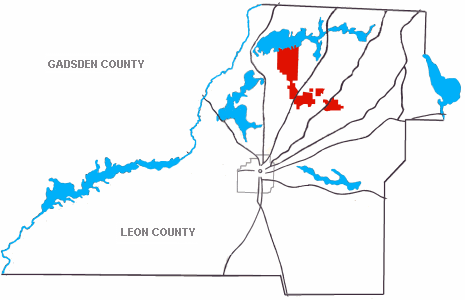
Location of Water Oak Plantation in 1913

When Clement A. Griscom died on October 19, 1916, Horseshoe Plantation was divided up and part sold. Lloyd C. Griscom received 4,000 acres (1,600 ha) on the west side naming it Luna Plantation while Frances C. Griscom, a sportswoman, received 7,000 acres (2,800 ha) of the old plantation to the east and named it Water Oak Plantation. Frances Griscom was the 1900 United States Women's Amateur Golf Championship.

In 1951 Griscom sold a large part of Water Oak to J.C. (Bull) Headley, a recent transplant from Kentucky. Griscom retained Water Oak with a few hundred acres of land. Headley turned his property in to Bull Run Plantation, a luxurious farm which grew in agricultural output. Headley ran several hundred head of cattle and continued with operations as a hunting plantation. Headley built a $150,000 Georgian style brick home overlooking Lake Iamonia. In 1964 Headley sold his hunting lodge and 3,700 acres (1,500 ha) to Gillis Long, a Congressman from Louisiana and assistant secretary of the Office of Economic Opportunity under President Lyndon Johnson. Other hunters, golfers, and fishing enthusiasts joined in and the property became Kinhega Lodge.
