= Bull Run Plantation =

Coordinates: 30.5805°N 84.2266°W

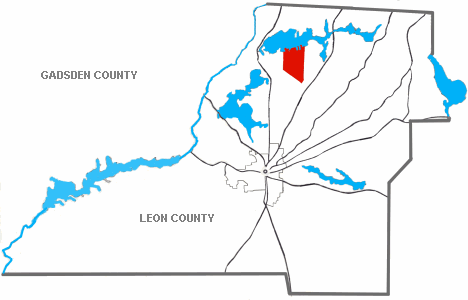
Location of Bull Run Plantation

Bull Run Plantation was a private estate owned by Julien C. (Bull) Headley (Heed-Lee) located in Leon County, Florida, United States.

== History ==
Originally a large part of Water Oak Plantation owned by Frances C. Griscom, Headley purchased all but a few hundred acres from Griscom in 1951. He named it Bull Run Plantation. Julian C. (Bull) Headley was a lumberman by career. Starting with the land itself, Headley reduced most of the trees converting the land to cattle range where he ran about 500 head of beef cattle and used the Louisiana Catahoula Leopard Dog for herding.

=== The house ===
Upon purchasing the property, Headley found that the old Griscom home was too small and in need of extensive repairs. Headley had the house razed and built a new brick mansion overlooking Lake Iamonia. He brought in pecan and other expensive wood for the home's interior paneling and finish work. The roof was over-engineered using rafters which measured 2 feet (0.61 m) by 10 feet (3.0 m) and set every 12 inches (300 mm). Headley also built a large bathhouse and swimming pool reportedly to cost $25,000. He also had polar bear rugs. The bricks from Griscom's home were used along with bricks he brought in from North Carolina to create terraces and walkways.

=== Grounds ===
Headley was a sportsman enjoying hunting and sports fishing. He preserved large areas of his property especially for hunting and fishing. He constructed a dam to slow a small stream that flowed south to north to create the chain of lakes now running through Golden Eagle Country Club. Headley then created his own duck lake called Lake Monkey Business.

== Sale ==
In 1964 Headley became attracted to the prospects in Central America, specifically its timber resources. Headley sold his property to a syndicate of sportsmen and left for British Honduras (Belize). The syndicate was interested in a recreational preserve. One of the members was Gillis Long, a Congressman from Louisiana and assistant secretary of the Office of Economic Opportunity under President Lyndon Johnson. Kinhega Lodge was established and a Donald Davis was put in charge of developing fields and ponds and supervise hunting and fishing. Plans for a golf course and landing strip bankrupted the syndicate, bringing it to its end. Kinhega Lodge was sold to the Killearn Lakes developer in 1985.
