= Meridian Plantation =

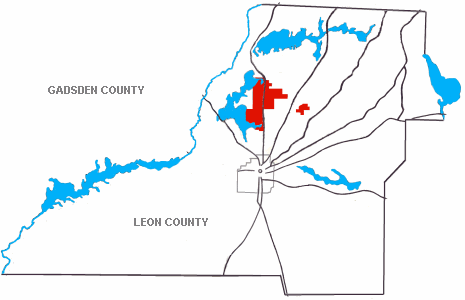
Luna Plantation in 1947

Meridian Plantation was a quail hunting plantation in central Leon County, Florida. It was established by Arthur Lapsley in 1915. Lapsley was from Pomfret Center in Pomfret, Connecticut.

Meridian Plantation had previously been Mossview Plantation, and owned by the Whitehead family.

In 1933, Meridian Plantation was purchased by Dwight F. Davis. Davis was Assistant Secretary of War under President Calvin Coolidge and Governor General of the Philippines from 1929-1932. Davis also founded the tennis world's prestigious Davis Cup.

In 1945, Davis died with Meridian becoming the property of Griscom Bettle, nephew to Lloyd C. Griscom of Luna Plantation. Bettle would also acquire Rose Hill Plantation, a smaller plantation which bordered Lake Elizabeth on its east and also had considerable acreage near Lake Jackson. Rose Hill would be sold to Ralph Nicholson, former publisher of the New Orleans Item-Tribune and other newspapers.

Adjacent plantations:

- Ayavalla Plantation to the west
- Live Oak Plantation to the south
