= Elinor Klapp-Phipps Park =

Park in Tallahassee, Florida

Coordinates: 30.5319°N 84.2928°W

Elinor Klapp-Phipps Park trail west of 701 Miller Landing Road trailhead

Elinor Klapp-Phipps Park is an open natural park located in northern Tallahassee, Florida, United States and operated by the City Of Tallahassee. The property is owned by Northwest Florida Water Management District.

== History ==
The land was originally used as farm land by the Seminole Indians and later became the cotton plantations Mossview Plantation established by Amos Whitehead and Meridian Plantation, a quail hunting plantation established by Dwight F. Davis of Davis Cup fame. In 1945, the property was acquired by Griscom Bettle followed by John H. H. Phipps and in 1958 inherited by Colin Phipps. Colin Phipps purchased nearby additional property which is now included as part of the park.

== Operation ==
The property is maintained and managed by the City of Tallahassee. Tallahassee is charged with preserving and protecting the property as a Lake Jackson watershed as well as providing the opportunity for diverse environmental education and recreation for all ages, consistent with maintaining the resource base.

The park has miles of trails for hiking, bicycling, walking, and horseback riding through old fields, open pine woods, and mixed pine-hardwood forest. This environment is home to a variety of flora and fauna.

The park is home to the annual Swamp Forest Trail Marathon, Half Marathon, and 6.5 Mile Run which takes place the first Saturday in January. This race course features both single-track and multi-use trails. Proceeds from the event benefit the Tallahassee Friends of Our Parks Foundation, Inc. and are designated for trail maintenance and improvements in the park. This event is limited to 150 runners. The park also host two events of the Gulf Winds Summer Trail Series each year.

The park is home to the Red Bug Trail Mountain Bike Trail: The Red Bug Mountain Bike Trail is one of the oldest in the city park system. The trail is a 4-mile trail that is the most tight and technical of all the city park trails and is considered to be an upper level intermediate trail.
