= Ayavalla Plantation =

Quail hunting plantation in Leon County, Florida, U.S.

Coordinates: 30.5618731°N 84.354088°W

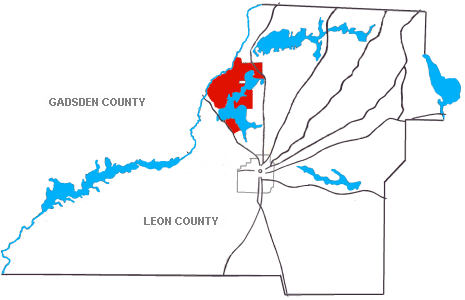
Location of Ayavalla Plantation in 1947

Ayavalla Plantation was a quail hunting plantation located in northwest Leon County, Florida, established by John Henry Howard Phipps, son of John Shaffer Phipps of the prominent Phipps family.

Ayavalla was the Indian word used by Ellen Call Long for Lake Jackson. Long was the previous resident of nearby Orchard Pond Plantation and daughter of Governor Richard Keith Call.

Upon John Shaffer Phipps' death in 1958, Orchard Pond Plantation and 1,200 acres (490 ha) were passed on to grandson Colin Phipps, and grandson John E. Phipps was given 2,100 acres (8.5 km^{2}) on Ox Bottom Road.

Adjacent plantations:

- Luna Plantation to the north
- Meridian Plantation to the east

Ayavalla and the neighboring property of Elinor Klapp-Phipps Park host part of the Red Hills Horse Trials.
