= Burgesstown Plantation =

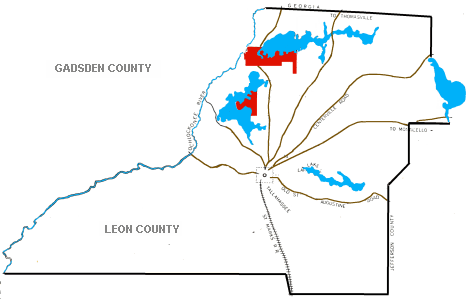
Location of Burgesstown Plantation

Burgesstown Plantation was a large forced-labor farm of 8,100 acres (3,300 ha) in northern Leon County, Florida, United States established by Frederich R. Cotten between 1850 and 1855. Cotten used the forced labor of enslaved people to work his land, which was primarily devoted to growing cotton as a cash crop.

== Plantation location ==
Burgesstown extended to the west as far as the Ochlockonee River, to the east it would cross what is now Meridian Road and border the southern edge of Lake Iamonia. The boundaries would continue east and include the development of Luna Pines and the northern reaches of the development of Killearn Lakes Plantation and would protrude south into the development of Golden Eagle Plantation and Golden Eagle Country Club.

The smaller southern section of the plantation bordering Lake Jackson encompasses what is now the western edge of Phipps-Overstreet Park, the western part of Miller Landing Rd. and E. Rollins Point Rd.

== Plantation statistics ==
The Leon County Florida 1860 Agricultural Census shows that Burgesstown Plantation had the following:

- Improved Land: 3,800 acres (1,500 ha)
- Unimproved Land: 4,300 acres (1,700 ha)
- Cash value of plantation: US$22,000
- Cash value of farm implements/machinery: $200
- Cash value of farm animals: $600
- Number of enslaved persons: 274
- corn: 13,000 bushels (460 m³)
- cotton: 825 bales

Frederick Cotten also had control over a farm of his deceased brother which produced 185 bales of cotton. Cotten's total real estate was valued at $100,000.

During the dry season of April and May, Cotten took advantage of his property being located on two lakes which would dry in to prairie lakes. Cotten used the now extra area to graze his $17,600 worth of livestock including over 1000 swine, 16 work oxen, 60 dairy cows, 72 mules and asses, and 15 horses.

In addition to growing cotton, in 1860 Cotten harvested:

- 4000 bushels (140 m³) of sweet potatoes
- 75 tons of hay
- 2000 bushels (70 m³) of peas and beans
- 30 bushels (10 m³) of Irish potatoes

== The owner ==
Frederich R. Cotten who had moved with his wife Elizabeth to Leon County in 1841 from North Carolina. Frederich was the son of Spencer D. Cotten of Tarboro, North Carolina. On May 26, 1845, Cotten participated in the first statewide election for state representatives and was one of six elected from Leon County.

In 1851, Cotten purchased 35 people trafficked for enslavement: Old Penny, young Penny, Wilkes, Enoch, Molly, Sarry, Sylvia, Albery, Nancy, Rosetta, Betsy, John, Franklin, Jacob Sr., Jacob Jr., Jerry, Frederick, Penelope, Lucy, Jenny, Lydia, Guni [?], Seaborn, Susan, Washington, Aga [?], George, Martha, Sarah, Louisa Winna, Mourning, Scipio, Davy, Parthana, and Margaret. Cotten's enslaved people were valued at $164,000.

Cotten died July 7, 1878.

== Ownership transfer ==
The plantation property was kept by the Cotten heirs, the Whiteheads, until they sold the portion which ran along the south shore of Lake Iamonia to Lloyd Griscom who named it Luna Plantation.
