= Dolobran (Haverford, Pennsylvania) =

Historic house in Pennsylvania, USA

Coordinates: 40.02090°N 75.29295°W

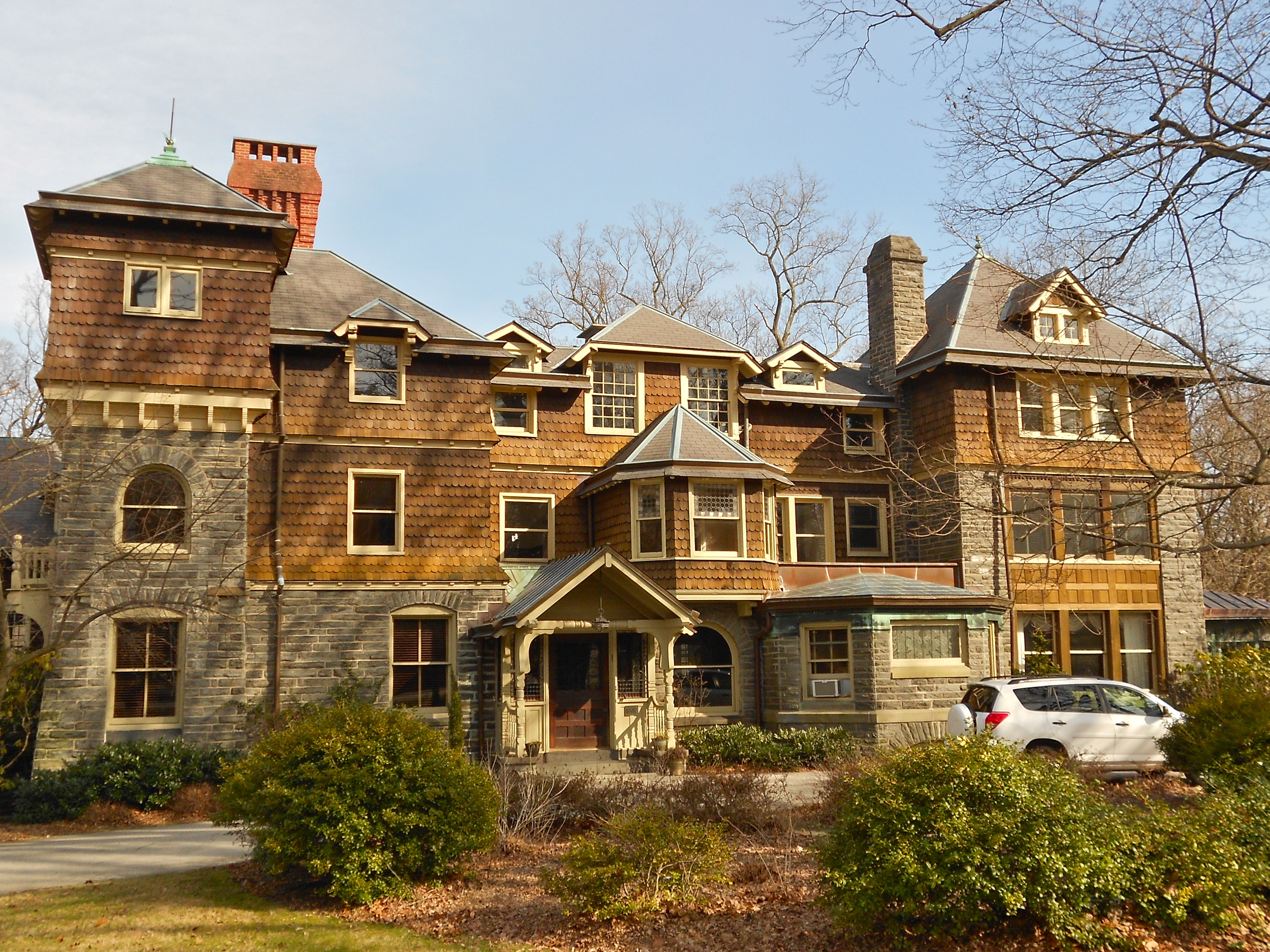
Dolobran, in 2013.

Dolobran is a Shingle Style house at 231 Laurel Lane in Haverford, Pennsylvania. It was designed by architect Frank Furness for shipping magnate Clement Griscom in 1881, and was expanded at least twice by Furness. The house and 146-acre (59 hectare) estate served as a summer retreat for Griscom, his wife, and five children.

It was named for Dolobran, the Welsh manor and estate of Griscom's ancestors.

== House ==
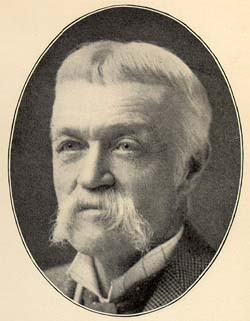
Frank Furness (1839–1912).

The main house stands on the edge of a hill, with the land sloping down on the north, east and south sides to tributaries of Mill Creek.

Furness altered an existing stone house, turning its first and second floors into the hall and upper hall of the new house, and shooting out rooms in multiple directions. This was one of his most exuberant and freewheeling suburban houses, featuring a stone water tower with Juliet balconies, his trademark "upside-down" brick chimneys, roofs with jerkin head gables, dormers topped with gabled, hipped, shed (and even one tall, pyramidical) roofs, a great bay window thrusting out at the top of the stairs, and a Japanese tea room appended to the wrap-around porch. Architectural historian James F. O'Gorman described the exterior as "a plastic chorus of towers, bays, sheds, gables, and chimneys." The upper floors were clad in wood shingles, varying between shakes and fish-scales.

The interior was also Japanese-influenced. The hall's walls and ceiling were paneled in dark, mahogany coffering, with a narrow, latticed stair in the center of the room rising steeply like a ship's gangway. Surrounding this are blue-and-white, Delft-tile murals and a Jacobean chimneypiece – gifts from the Queen of the Netherlands, in gratitude for one of Griscom's ships helping to rescue the passengers and crew of a sinking Dutch ship. The hall's ceiling has a large rectangular cut-out, framed by a latticed railing, that allows natural light to stream down from second-story windows.

Architectural historian Michael J. Lewis sees the influence of the German Gothic Revival's "love of picturesque vagaries and eccentricity" in Dolobran. Rather than the "disciplined picturesque[ness]" of H. H. Richardson, Stanford White or Bruce Price, who "sought to impose classical values of calm and repose on plans that were rather irregular," Furness embraced a "restlessness and turbulence" in his complex and sometimes unorthodox massing of volumes. Dolobran was an artistic breakthrough for the architect, a milestone on the road to "an original synthesis" that would inform his later buildings.

=== Circa-1888 expansion ===
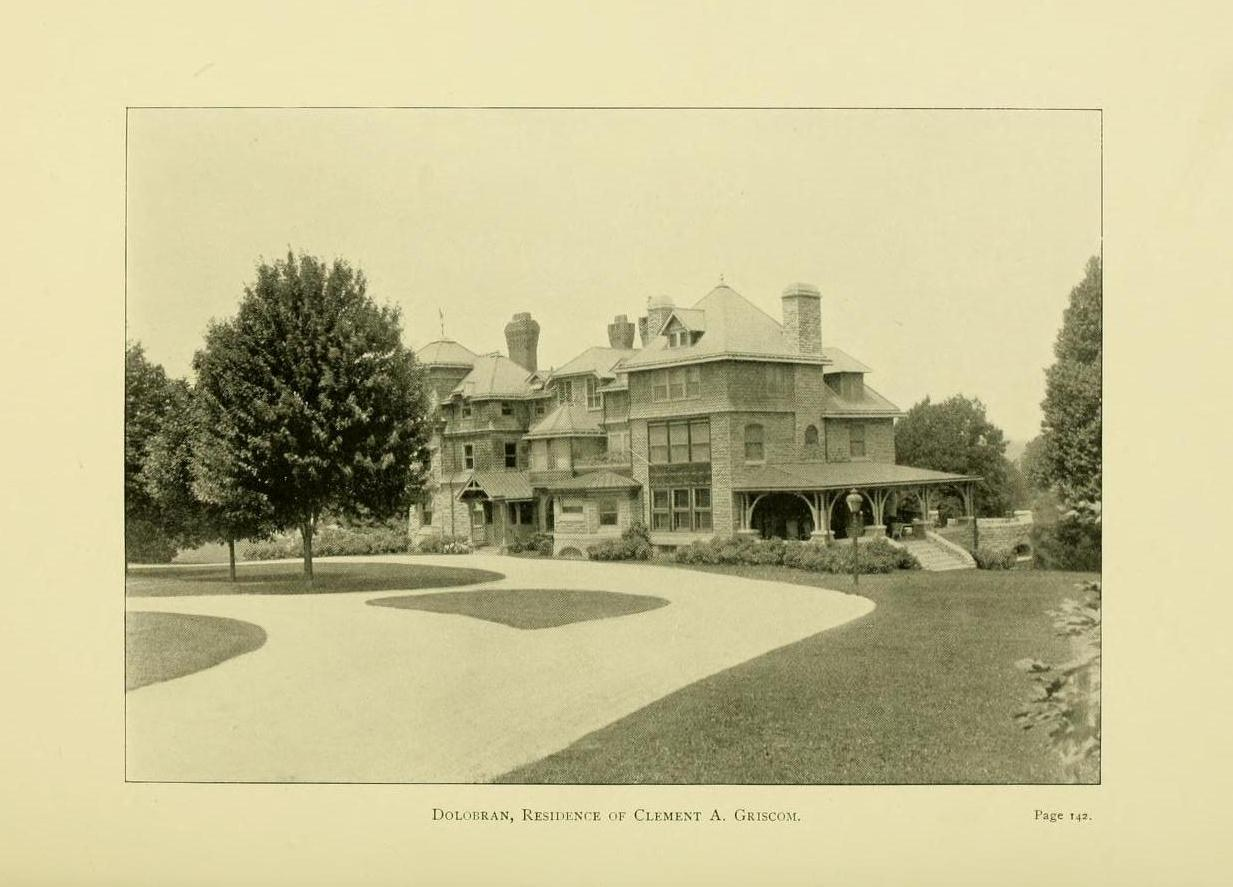
Dolobran, circa 1890 (between the circa-1888 and 1894-95 expansions).

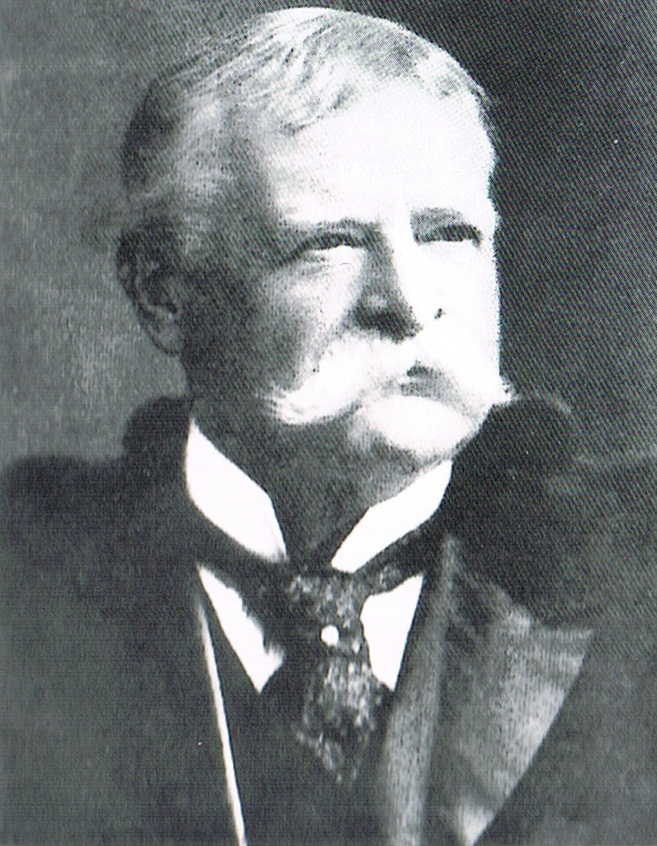
Clement Griscom (1841–1912).

The circa-1888 expansion of the house was more restrained, and included the three-story east addition – with pyramidical roof and stone chimneys – the octagonal study, and the verandah with its graceful, arching brackets. The three-story, L-shaped servant's wing – with expanded kitchen and bedrooms above – either was part of these alterations or those in 1894–95.

The new interiors were in a different style and at a larger scale. Furness was exploring the Art Nouveau, and used a calla lily motif – sometimes literally, sometimes abstractly – for the mantel brackets in the drawingroom, the fireplace mosaics in the master bedroom and library, the stone carvings of the study fireplace, and a glorious leaded glass window, also in the study. The circa-1888 alterations probably included the front bedroom's buff-colored, terra-cotta fireplace and mantel, the detailing of which is closely related to the reading room of Furness's contemporaneous University of Pennsylvania Library (1888–91).

=== 1894-95 expansion ===
With the 1894-95 expansion, Griscom turned his large house into a mansion. A library beneath the dining room, probably part of the circa-1888 alterations, had opened onto a sunken patio. Furness excavated into the hill, turning the basement library into a balcony room overlooking a subterranean art gallery. The vast two-story space – 40 by 50 feet (12.2 x 15.2 m) – is illuminated by two long strips of skylights, flanking the terrace above, and large windows at the room's east end where the hill drops away. This created an unexpectedly grand – and, importantly, fireproof – setting for Griscom's collection of landscape paintings and British portraits. The addition's exterior walls are faced with stone similar to the house's, but the art gallery's gigantic scale and Beaux-Arts formality is incongruous with the jocular informality of the original house.

The 1894 commission may have included houses for two of Griscom's children and their families. A January 1901 magazine article notes three houses on the property.

=== 1901 description ===
Lady Enid Layard, visited Dolobran in 1901 and described it in her journal:

24 August 1901 – We passed through lovely towns & passed beautiful (tho’ not very old) trees—by pleasant villas till we found ourselves in abt 10 minutes at the door of “Dolobran.” Mrs Griscom was at the door & gave us a warm welcome. The house is low but the rooms large & furnished with every modern luxury & comfort & with taste & knowledge of old furniture & pictures. It was abt 12.30 when we arrived & we were glad of luncheon which was served about 2. The Griscom family [children] live in patriarchal style—all round the parents house. A son named “Rod” is also living close by. After lunch I rested in my own room a large low room with 4 windows shaded by outer blinds. At 5 we had tea in the covered verandah which is practically another living room. By dinner time Mr Griscom père had come out from New York & added much to the hilarity & jollity. After dinner we all spent the evening in a large room called the Art room where there are various fine pictures by Lawrence, Sir Joshua, Van der Helst, Romney &c &c.

== Grounds ==
Griscom purchased the first part of the property in 1879, probably the 49.5 acres (20 hectares) shown on an 1881 map. He made subsequent land purchases that expanded it ultimately to 146 acres (59 hectares), including a working farm and quarry. The topography is undulating and irregular, with outcroppings of granite schist. Landscape architect Warren H. Manning made the most of the dramatic property in the late-1890s, designing a twisting, scenic carriage drive and planting a 30-acre (12.1 hectare) "wild garden" of native plants in and around an abandoned quarry.

=== Soapstone Farm ===
Northeast of the house, Griscom operated a dairy farm. Furness is credited with designing the great barn, some of which was converted into a house in the 20th century, and survives at 608 Robinson Lane. A small tenant farmer house is also attributed to Furness's firm.

A January 1901 magazine article describes Griscom's farm in detail, and states that his dairy herd was 75 cows.

=== 1897 description ===
Reverend Samuel F. Hotchkin described the grounds in 1897:

Dolobran. – The country-seat of Clement A. Griscom, Esq., is a about half a mile northeast from Haverford Station, Pennsylvania Railroad, and comprises somewhat more than eighty acres, of a rolling, uneven nature, the larger portion of the land sloping generally toward the northward, and eastward to a stream of water which flows through the tract in an easterly direction. The tract is nearly rectangular in shape. The southwestern portion is gently rolling, and has been appropriated for a lawn, through which the carriage road winds to the residence past beds of beautiful variegated plants and flowers, clumps of evergreens, etc. Close by the residence is the upper end of a heavily wooded ravine, extending to the stream of water; a woodland walk has been made in this ravine, which is so closed in by trees and shrubbery that one could easily imagine himself following a path in the forest; here and there along this walk are rustic benches and 'crow-nests' for those who would rest a while. At the bottom of this walk we come out to the stream near a large lake, where there are facilities for boating and bathing. Near the head of the ravine just described, and near the mansion house is a flower garden devoted exclusively to Japanese plants. The northerly portion of the estate is naturally much rougher, and splendidly adapted by nature to the purpose to which Mr. Griscom has devoted about thirty acres of this section, namely, as an 'American Wild Garden.' Besides being originally heavily wooded, innumerable native American trees, plants, and flowers were brought from all sections of the country. Two or three old stone quarries in this tract have been utilized to make forest pools, in which are many varieties of beautiful water lilies and other water-growing flowers and plants; while rhododendrons and ferns abound along the shores of the pools and on the outcropping ledges of the cliffs. Throughout this tract woodland paths wind in every direction, along which the pedestrian can catch a glimpse of shaded pools, wooded glens, and nooks, mossy banks of rivulets, and such pretty bits of nature, and the paths are of a length that traversing all of them without going along the same one twice makes one feel that he had had plenty of exercise for the time. From the porch of the house one might imagine that the residence was the only building on the property, so thoroughly do the near-by tree growths hide the usual buildings of a country place, but it is only a walk of a minute or two through the trees to a finely-appointed stable, in which is kept a number of blooded horses for riding and driving, and not far off is a large greenhouse for the growth of many kinds of flowers, and hotbeds for early vegetable delicacies for the table. On the eastern edge of the estate is an attractive cottage occupied by Mr. and Mrs. Bettle, Mrs. Bettle being Mrs. Griscom's daughter; and at the foot of the lawn sloping to the eastward from the mansion house is another cottage in which reside Mr. Griscom's son, Rodman E. Griscom, and his wife.

== Recent history ==
External videos
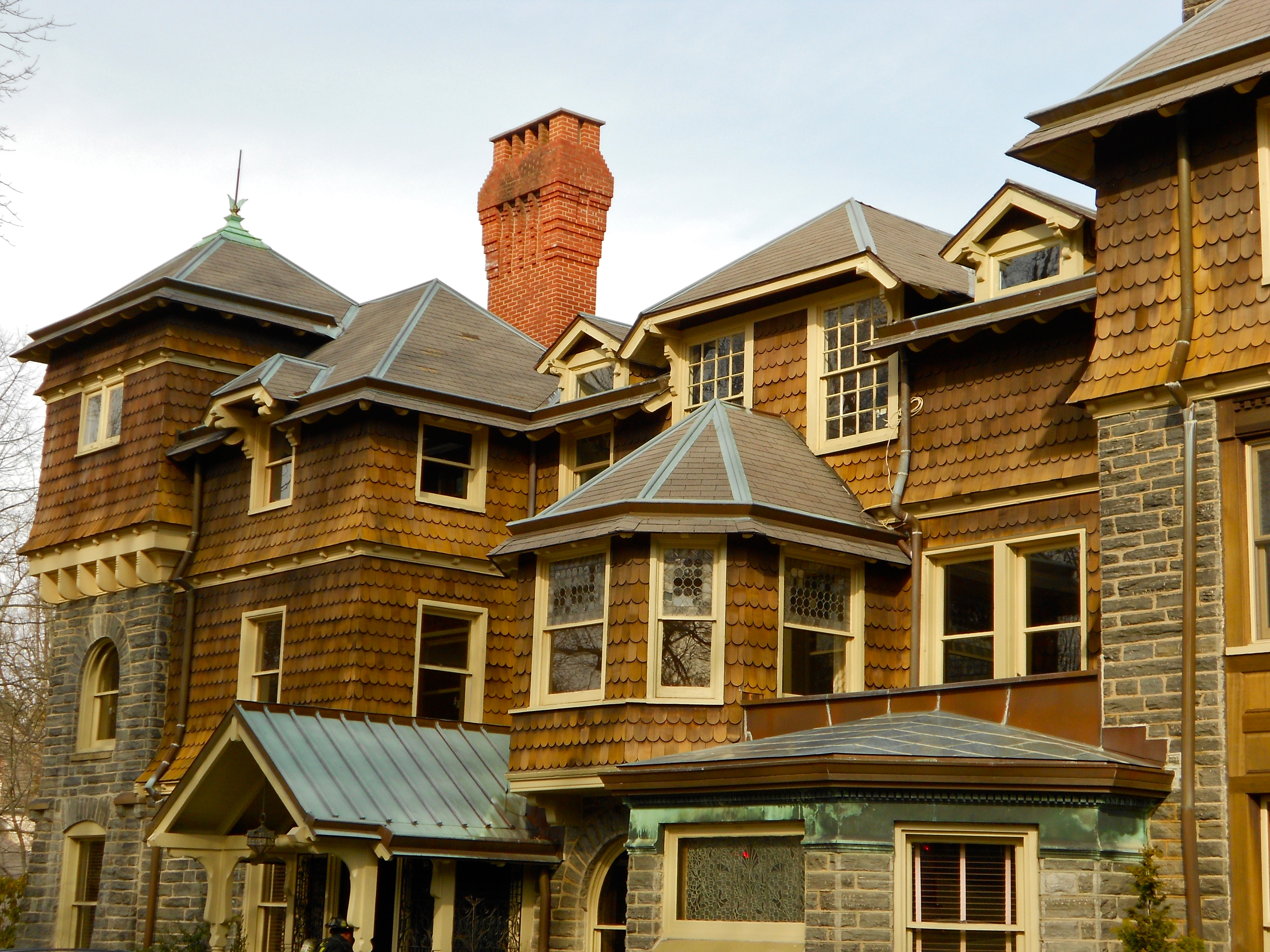
- Dolobran House, WHYY-TV
- Frank Furness Dolobran Mansion

Most of Dolobran's land was sold off in the 20th century. The mansion currently stands on slightly less than two acres.

The mansion was bought by Peter and Virginia Shihadeh of H & S Properties for $1,275,000 in October 1989. They hired James Garrison and A. Craig Morrison to undertake a complete restoration. The interior was redecorated by local designers for a Vassar Show House in May 1990.

In 2009, the mansion was offered for sale at $4,490,000 – listed with 9 bedrooms, 9 bathrooms, 17,000 square feet, on 1.94 acres. Following a couple years on the market, it was put up for public auction on October 6, 2012, but no buyer met the $750,000 starting bid. The mansion was bought by Dolobran Estate LLC privately for an undisclosed amount on November 16, 2012 (listed as one dollar on property records).

The property was further renovated and purchased by a local family on December 3, 2015.

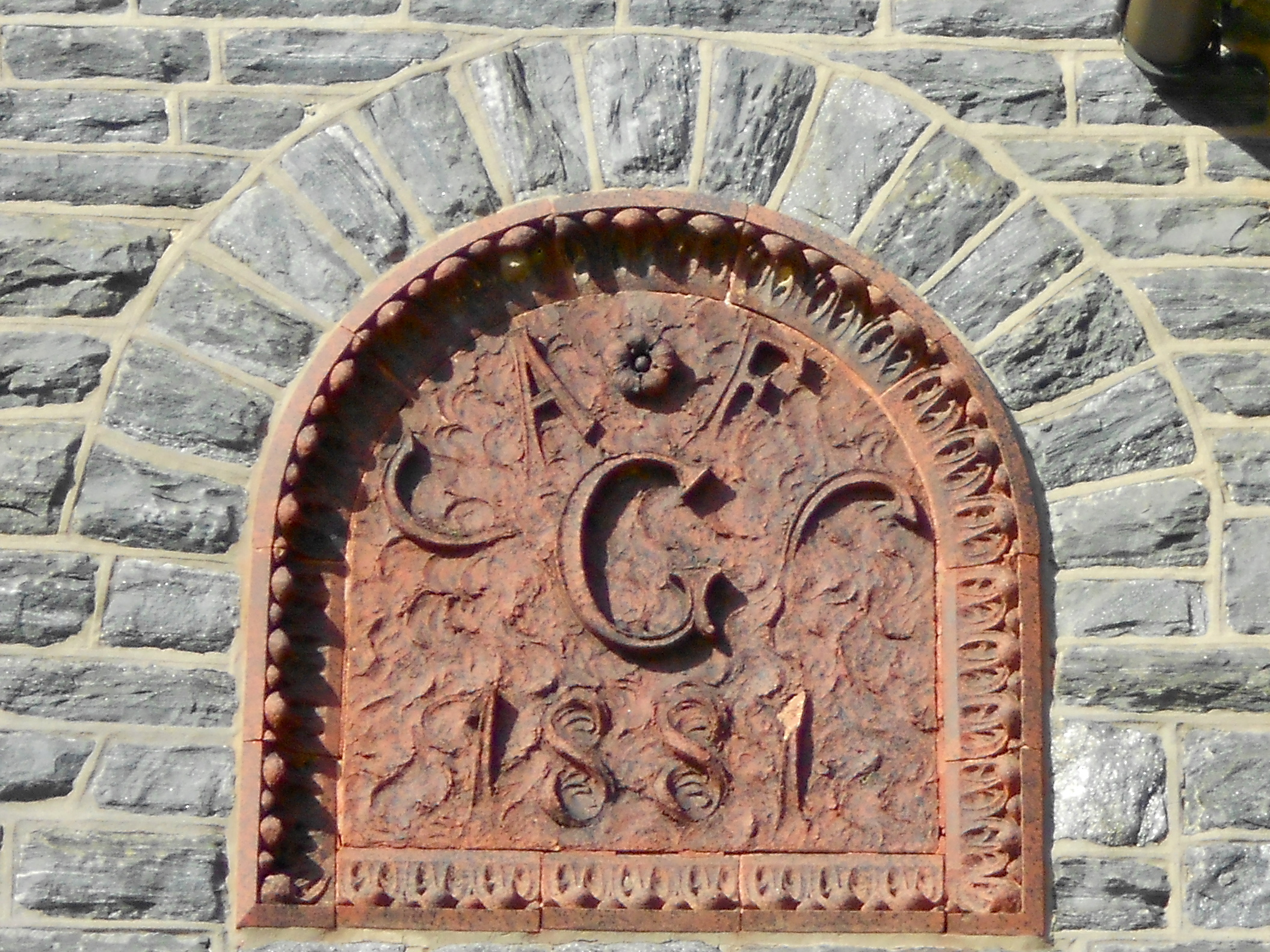
1881 date plaque.

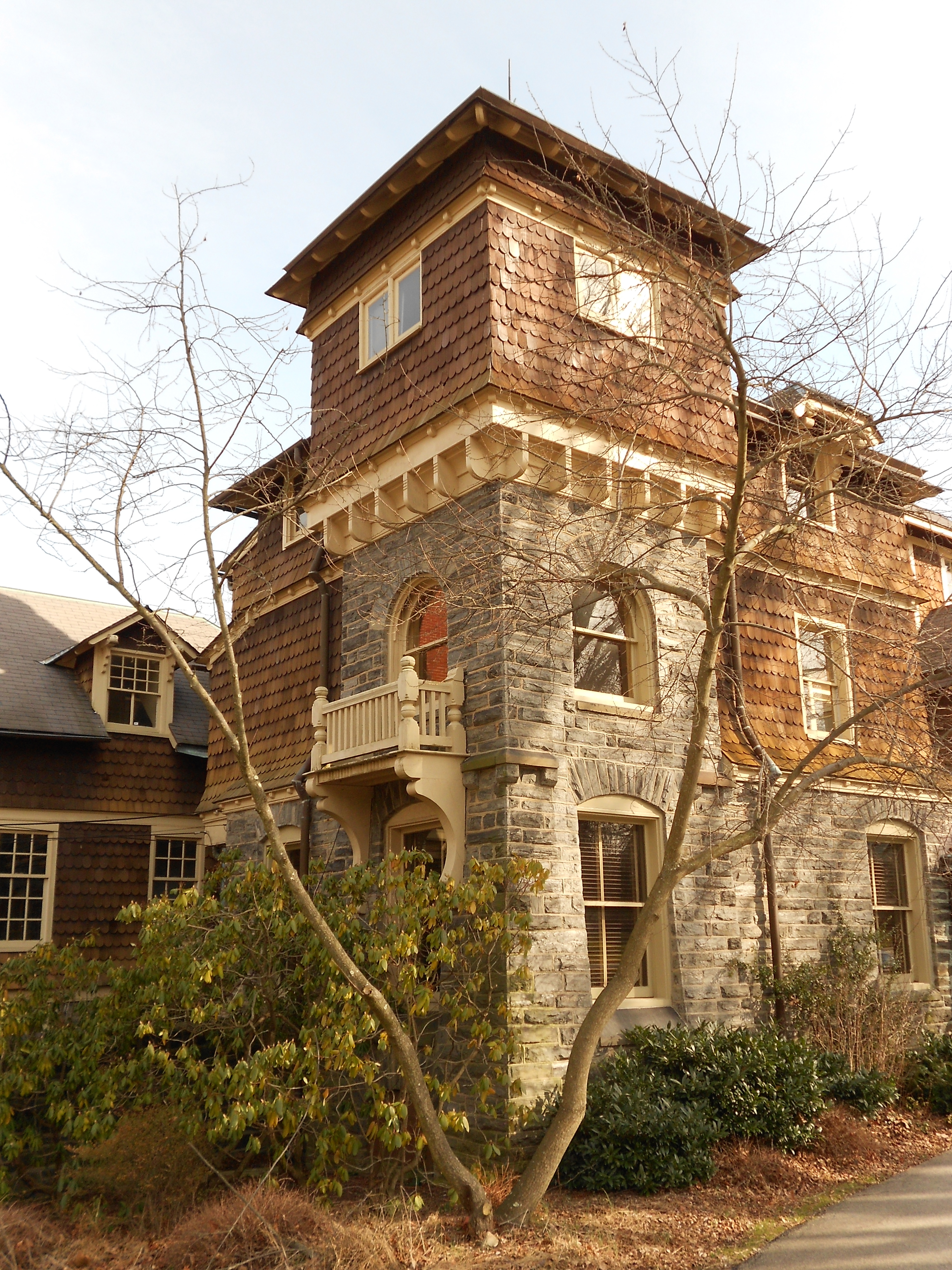
Former watertower.

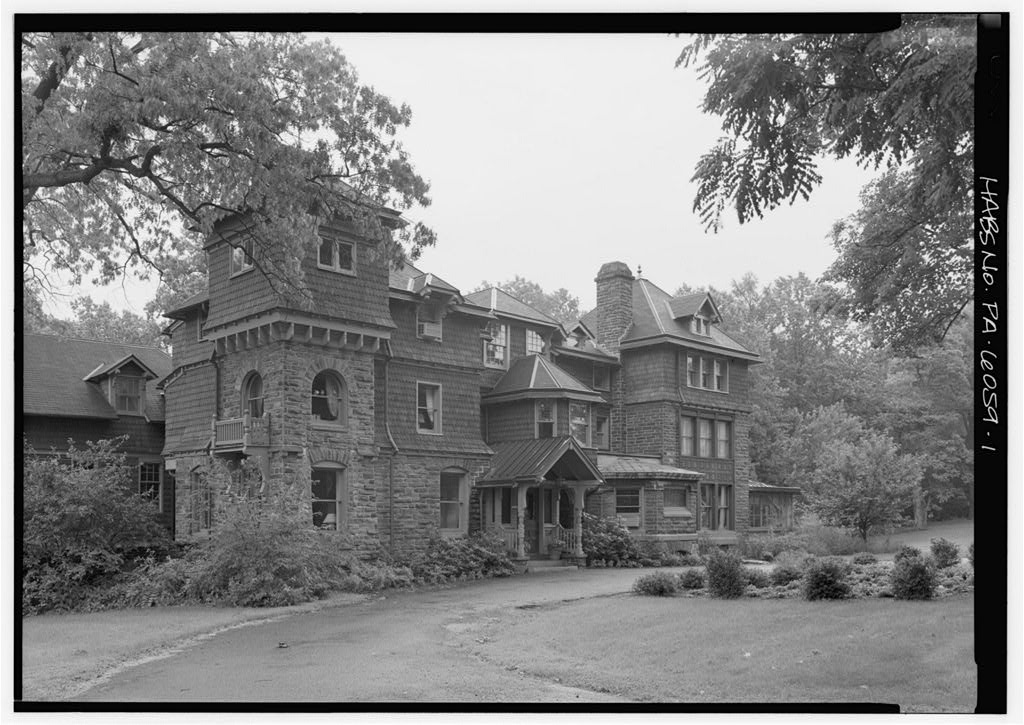
HABS photo, 1990.

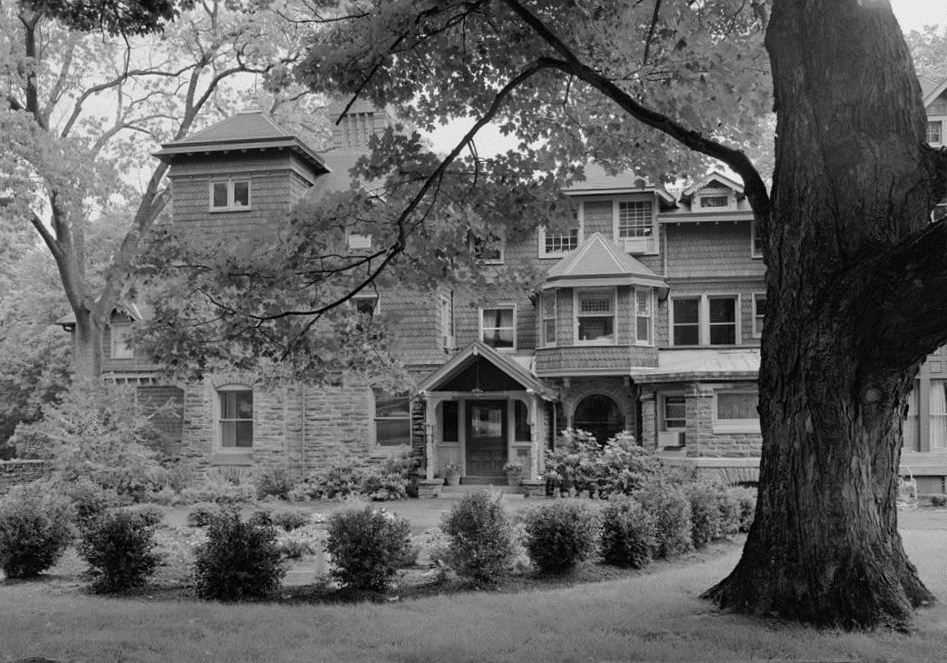
HABS photo, 1990.

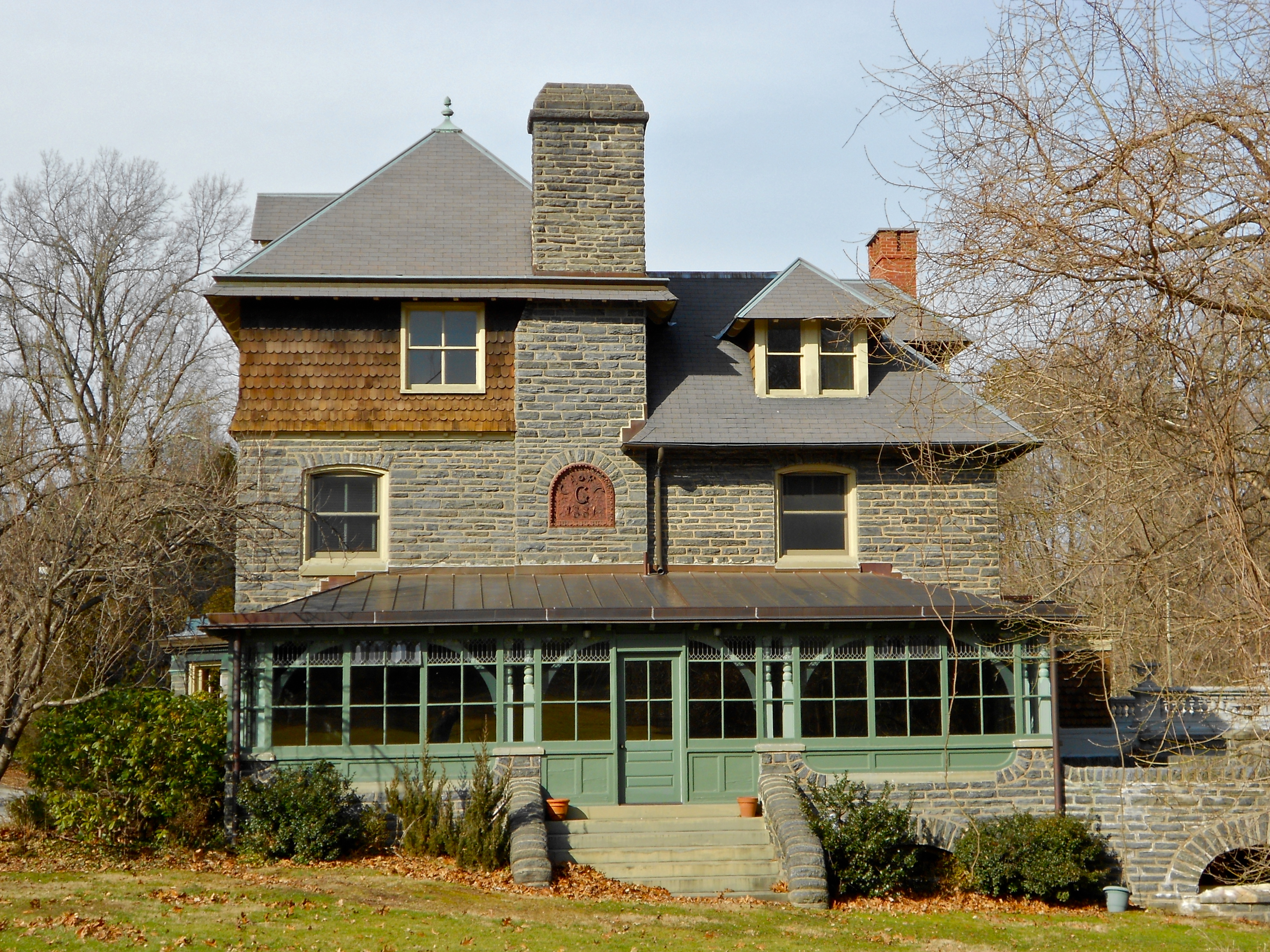
South facade of the circa-1888 expansion.
