= Lake Iamonia =

Lake in the state of Florida, United States

- Location within Florida Location within the United States

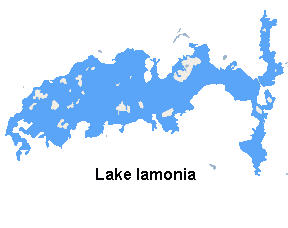
- map
- Location: Leon County, Florida
- Coordinates: 30°37′59″N 84°10′40″W
- Type: prairie lake; Oligotrophic to Mesotrophic
- Catchment area: 101 sq mi (260 km^{2})
- Basin countries: United States
- Max. length: 7 mi (11 km)
- Max. width: 2 mi (3 km)
- Surface area: 5,757 acres (2,330 ha)
- Surface elevation: 95 ft (29 m)

Lake Iamonia ⟨aɪ ˈmoʊ njə⟩ is a large, subtropical prairie lake in northern Leon County, Florida, United States, created during the Pleistocene epoch.

== History ==
=== Forming Iamonia ===
Lake Iamonia's base was established during the Early Pleistocene through submergence of land during the various glacial retreats (a warming period) and emergence from the sea during glacial stadial advancement (a cooling period). Though the ice sheet was further north, it affected Iamonia's appearance and significant changes began to take shape during the Okefenokee terrace and shoreline period and was complete by the end of the Wicomico terrace and shoreline event thousands of years later.

=== Ancient fauna ===
Lake Iamonia area is known to have supported a variety of megafauna from as far back as 23.6 Ma. Fossils of the bear-dog Amphicyon and the dog-like Temnocyonines have been uncovered at nearby sites. The Griscom Plantation Site, once located on Luna Plantation, and on the south shore of Iamonia has produced fossils of the ruminant Leptomeryx, the horse relatives Merychippus and Parahippus leonensis, and the ancient camel Oxydactylus. Osbornodon iamonensis (Osborn's dog), a forerunner of today's dog, was named for the lake.

=== Prehistoric people ===
The lake was home to the Woodland culture, more specifically the Weeden Island culture, of early Native Americans from roughly 200 BCE to 750 AD. It was within the Apalachee Province from 1000 AD to the 1520s and later the lake would become home to the Seminoles. Lake Iamonia is pronounced "I-monia" and is named after a Seminole town “Hiamonee,” which was located on the banks of the Ochlockonee River.

== Location ==
The lake is located in the Red Hills Region and is approximately 5,757 acres (23 km^{2}) in size and is 7 miles (11 km) long and up to 2 miles (3 km) wide. It has a drainage basin of roughly 101 square miles (260 km).

County Road 12 runs along the northern part of the lake. Tall Timbers Research Station and Land Conservancy is situated on a bluff on the north side of the lake. The eastern side borders near US 319, the south side is bordered by the developments of Killearn Lakes Plantation and Luna Pines. The west side edges near State Road 155 (N. Meridian Road). The highest elevation around the lake's basin is 220 feet (67 m).

== Details ==
Lake Iamonia is classified as oligotrophic to mesotrophic with a Hydrologic Unit Code (HUC) of 31200. The eastern end of Lake Iamonia is oligotrophic which makes it one of the cleanest lakes in Leon County. The lake is 95 feet (29 m) above sea level and the sink basin, located on the northern shore of Lake Iamonia, has a surface area of 19.52 acres (79,000 m^{2}). Its average depth is 7 feet (2 m) and its maximum depth is 40 feet (12 m). The lake is surrounded by 4000 acres (16 km^{2}) of land under conservation easement.

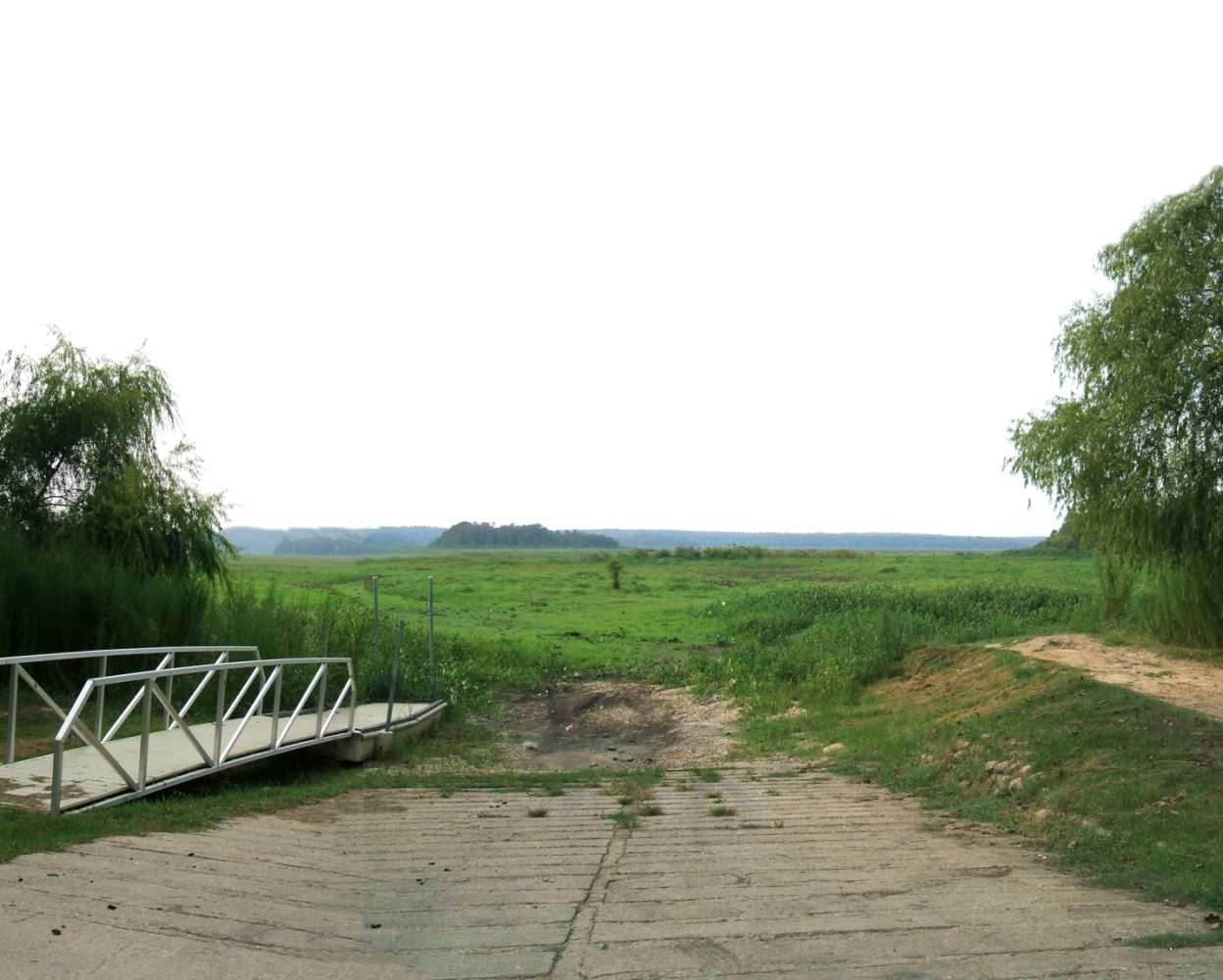
Lake Iamonia in its "prairie stage" during the drought of 2007 from Bull Headley landing (south shore)

The volume of water in the lake is affected by water in its own drainage basin and by water from the Ochlockonee River and rainfall in Southwestern Georgia. Following years of drought, the flooding of the Ochlockonee re-filled the entire body of the dried lake within 3 days in February 2008. Thunderstorms which hit the Florida panhandle and southwest Georgia on April 2 and 3 brought the level of the Ochlockonee River to 26.1 feet (8 m), 4 feet (1 m) above flood stage, raising the lake level substantially.

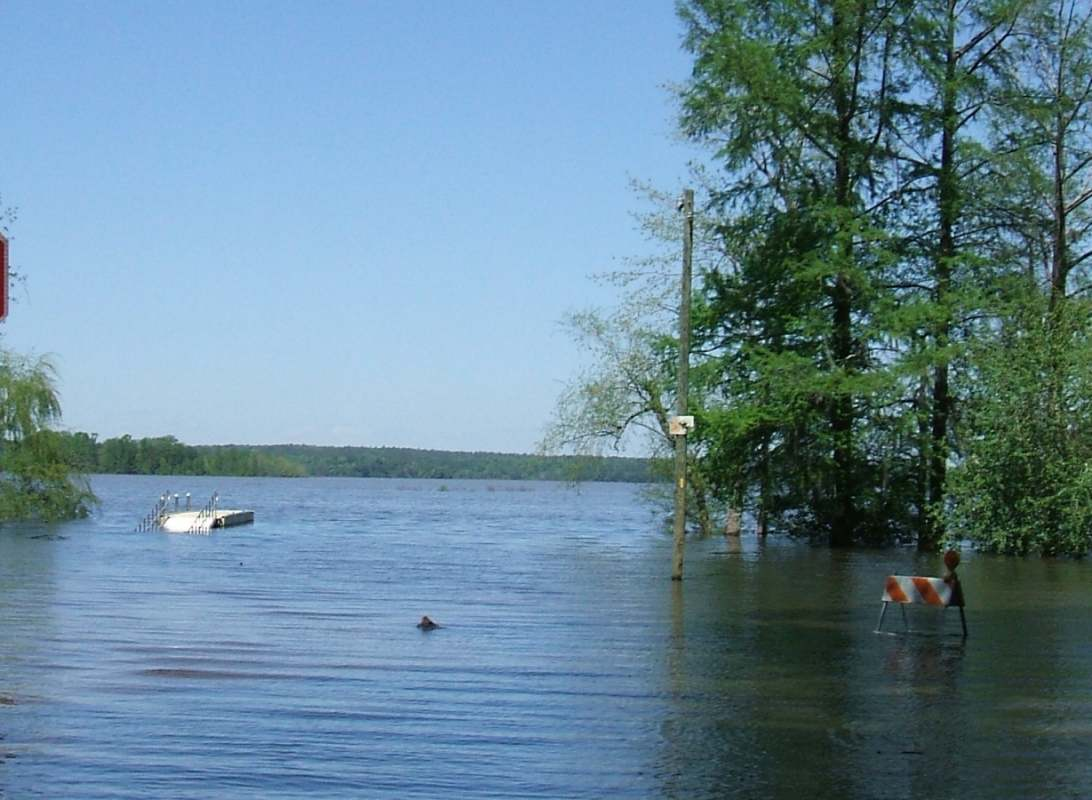
Lake Iamonia at flood stage from Bull Headley Landing on April 3, 2009

=== Dams and dikes ===
In 1910, a dam was constructed across the western end sloughs with two small bridges separated by 1,850 feet (564 m) of fill dirt. The dam separated Lake Iamonia from the Ochlockonee River to keep out the river's water so that the lake would dry for agricultural purposes.

In 1940 a 1,150 feet (351 m) long, 150 feet (46 m) wide earthen dike was constructed around the sink basin to keep water in the lake. A concrete spillway was constructed for overflow with metal pipes of diameter 60 inches (152 cm) and sluice gates built into the earthen dikes at the sink. Just before 1950 additional earthen dams were built across Cromartie Arm (to the south) and Strickland Arm (to the north) and bordering Horseshoe Plantation. The purpose of these dams was to keep water in Cromartie and Strickland Arms for the plantations.

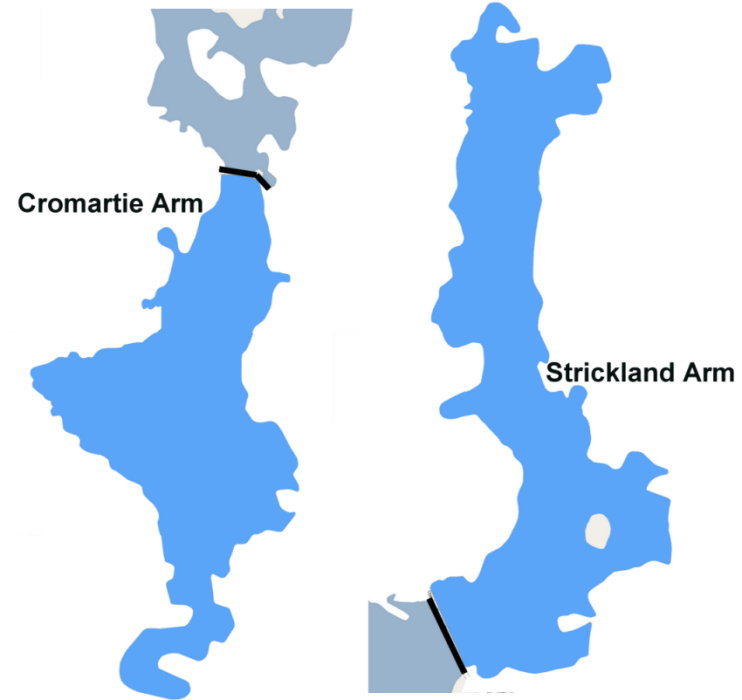
Cromartie Arm (southeast end) and Strickland arm, northeast end of Lake Iamonia

By the 1970s aquatic plants had increased in the lake. In 1978 the Florida Fish and Wildlife Conservation Commission constructed draw down structures in the sink basin on the north end and under the bridge on N. Meridian Road but were removed by 1980 due to damage from bald cypress roots. Northwest Florida Water Management District welded the sluice gates open and the sink drains continuously.

The sink area covers 19.5 acres (79,000 m^{2}) and has a maximum depth of 400 feet (122 m). It has a drain rate at 9.2 cubic feet per second.

== Prairie stage ==
In the antebellum 19th century, Lake Iamonia had Burgesstown Plantation, Pine Hill Plantation, Oaklawn Plantation and G.W. Holland Plantation surrounding it. During dry periods which naturally occurred in cycles, a few cotton plantation owners would take advantage of the exposed land and wealth of grasses and vegetation which took hold in the nutrient rich lake bottom and graze their cattle and sheep on the lake.

== Current fauna ==
=== Mammals ===
Species include the beaver, bobcat, cotton rat, common rat, marsh rice rat, oldfield mouse, eastern wood rat, coyote, gray fox, red fox, gray squirrel, fox squirrel, marsh rabbit, nine-banded armadillo, opossum, raccoon, river otter and white-tailed deer.

=== Fish ===
Iamonia is an attraction for sport fishing with largemouth bass, bluegill, black crappie, flier, redear sunfish, Florida gar, bowfin and American pickerel.

=== Reptiles ===
Reptiles include the American alligator, snapping turtle, Florida softshell turtle, peninsular cooter, pond slider, musk turtle, eastern mud turtle, chicken turtle, Suwannee cooter, box turtle, Florida green water snake, banded water snake, cottonmouth, black racer, corn snake, southern ribbon snake, garter snake, eastern kingsnake, black swamp snake, mud snake, red-bellied snake, ringneck snake, Yellow ratsnake, rough green snake, scarlet snake, coachwhip snake and eastern indigo snake.

=== Amphibians ===
Among amphibians, the Pig frog, bullfrog, leopard frog, green tree frog, squirrel tree frog, Florida cricket frog, two-toed amphiuma and central newt are present.

== Gallery ==
The photos show Lake Iamonia at a normal level of water.

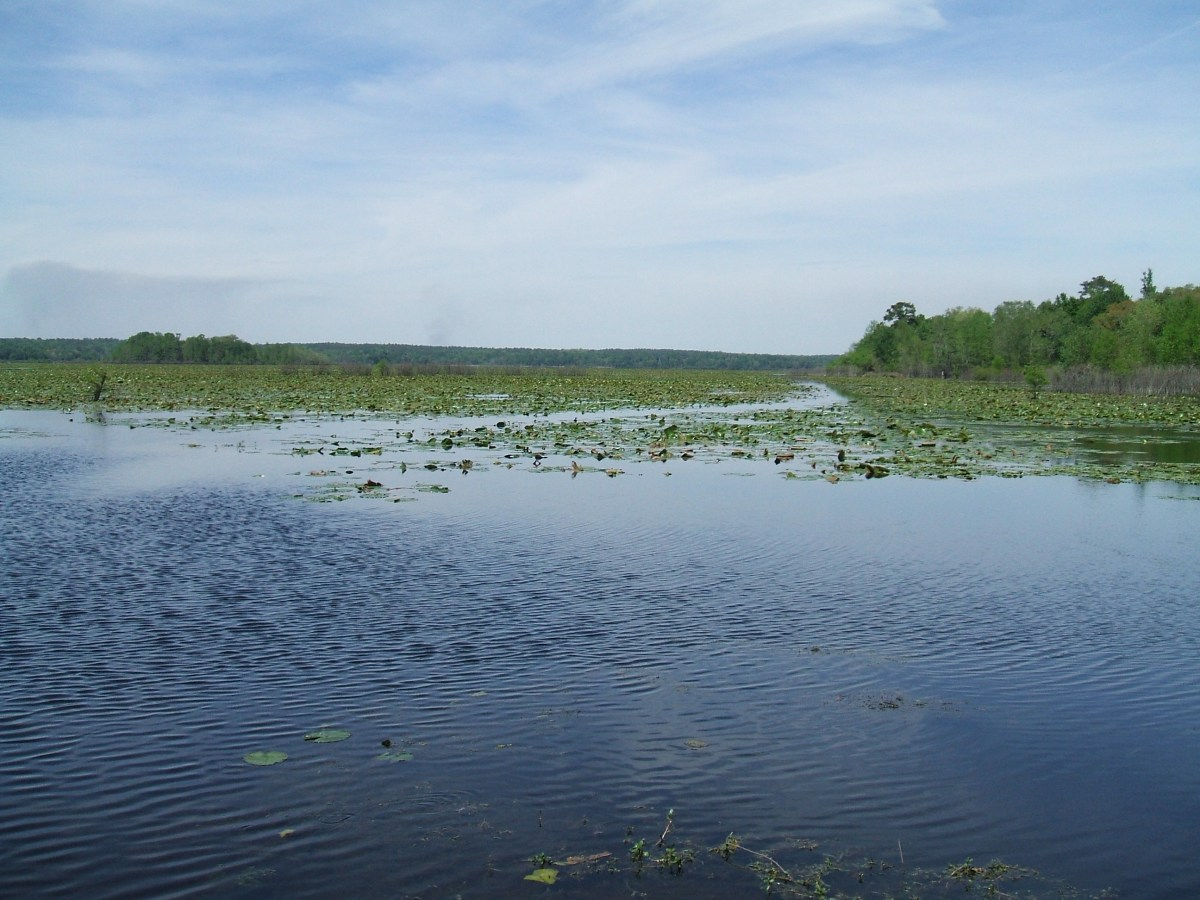
View from south shore

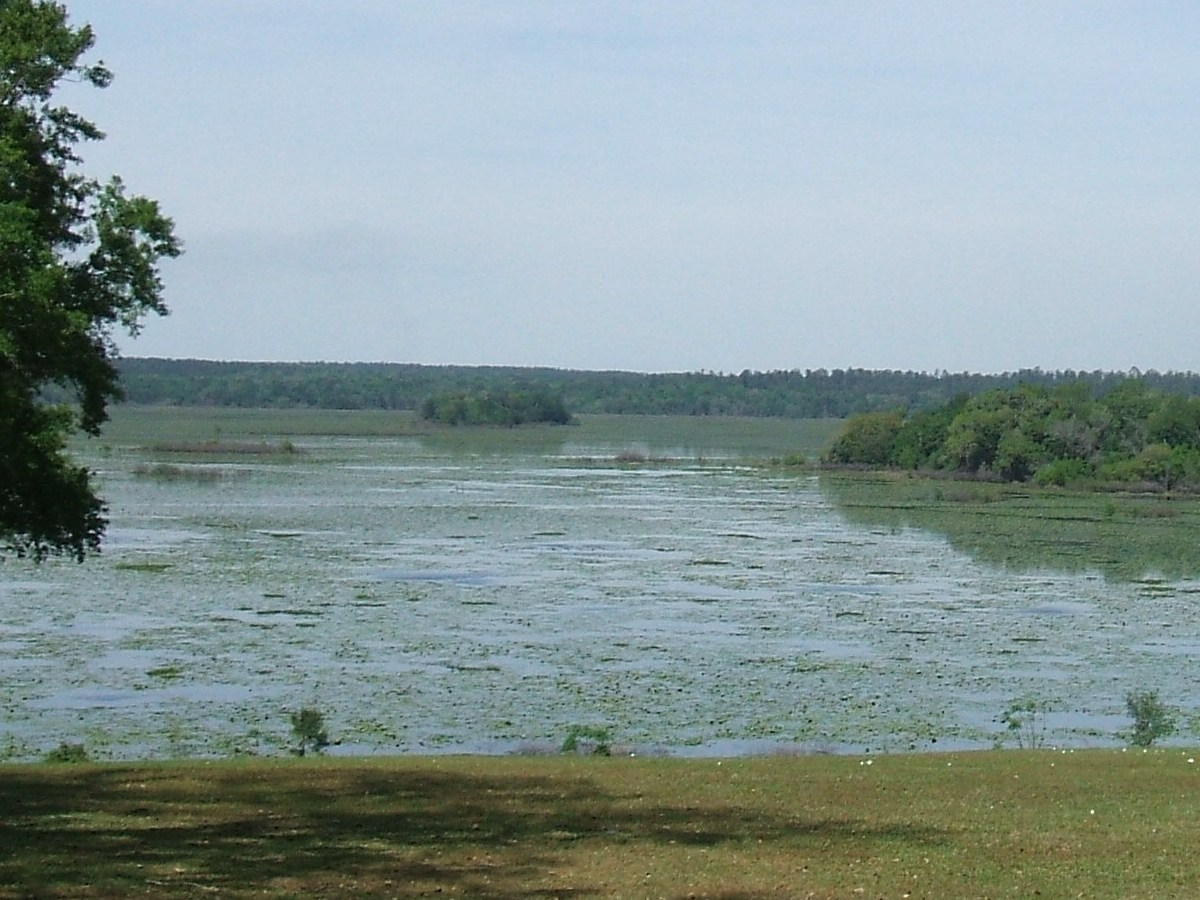
View from south shore

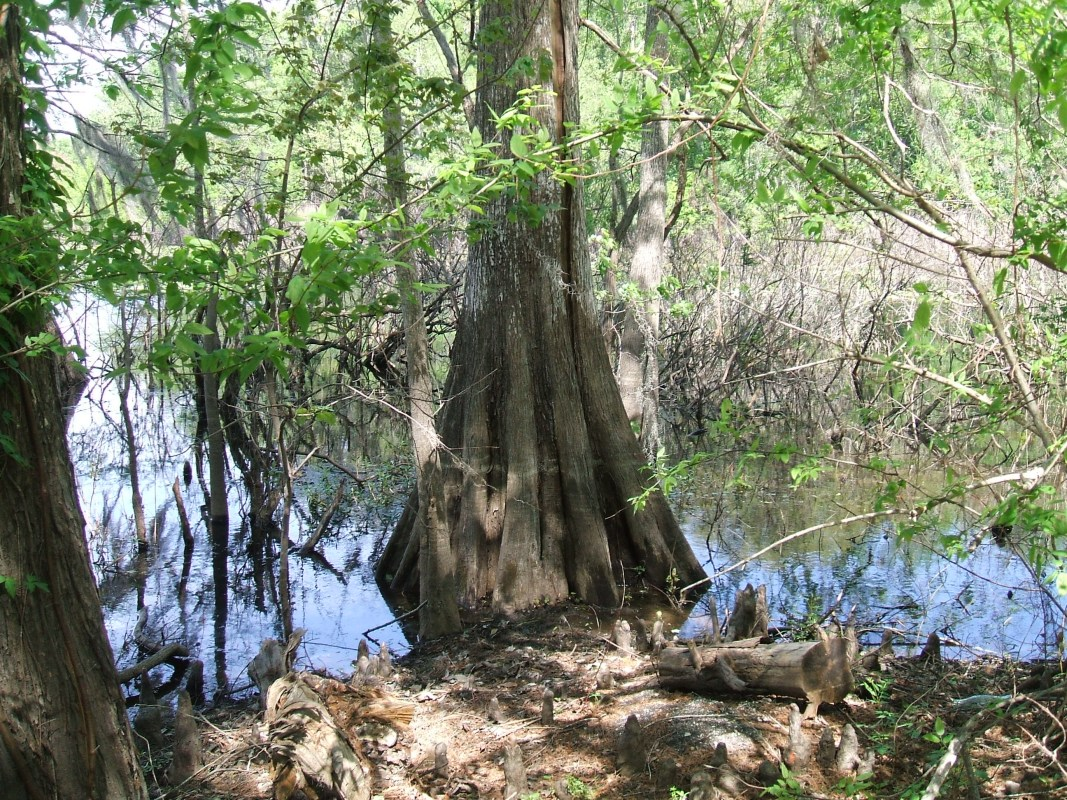
Cypress tree

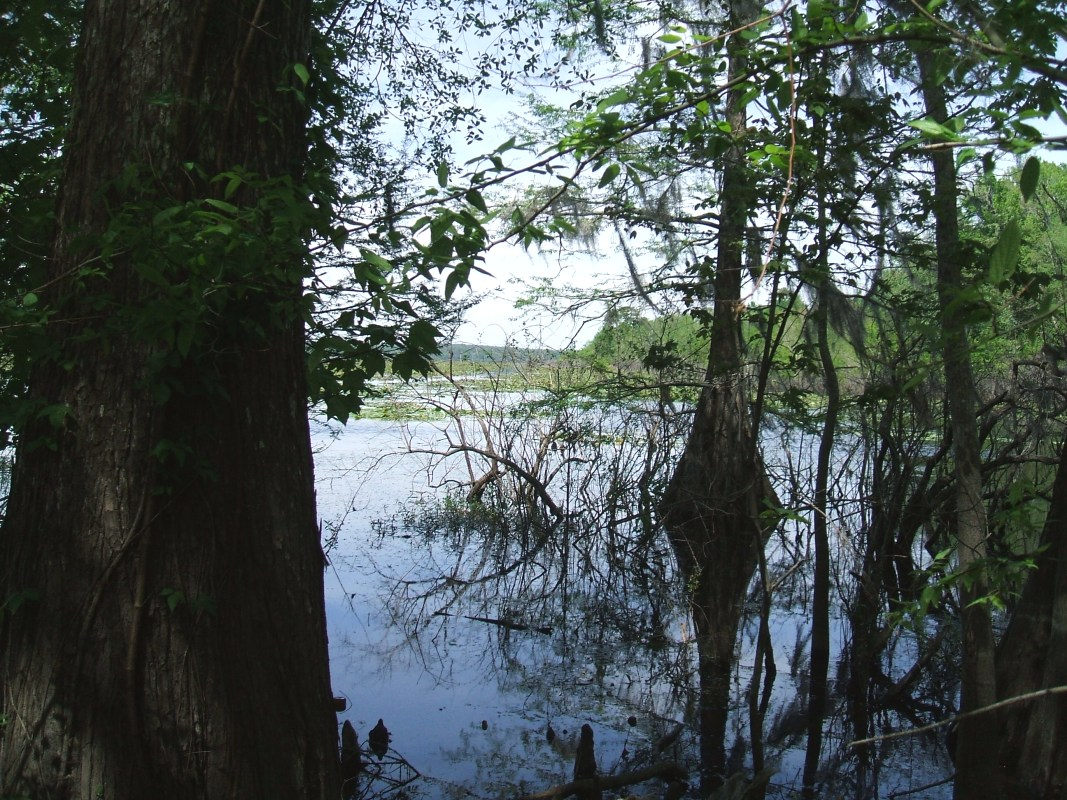
Cypress trees

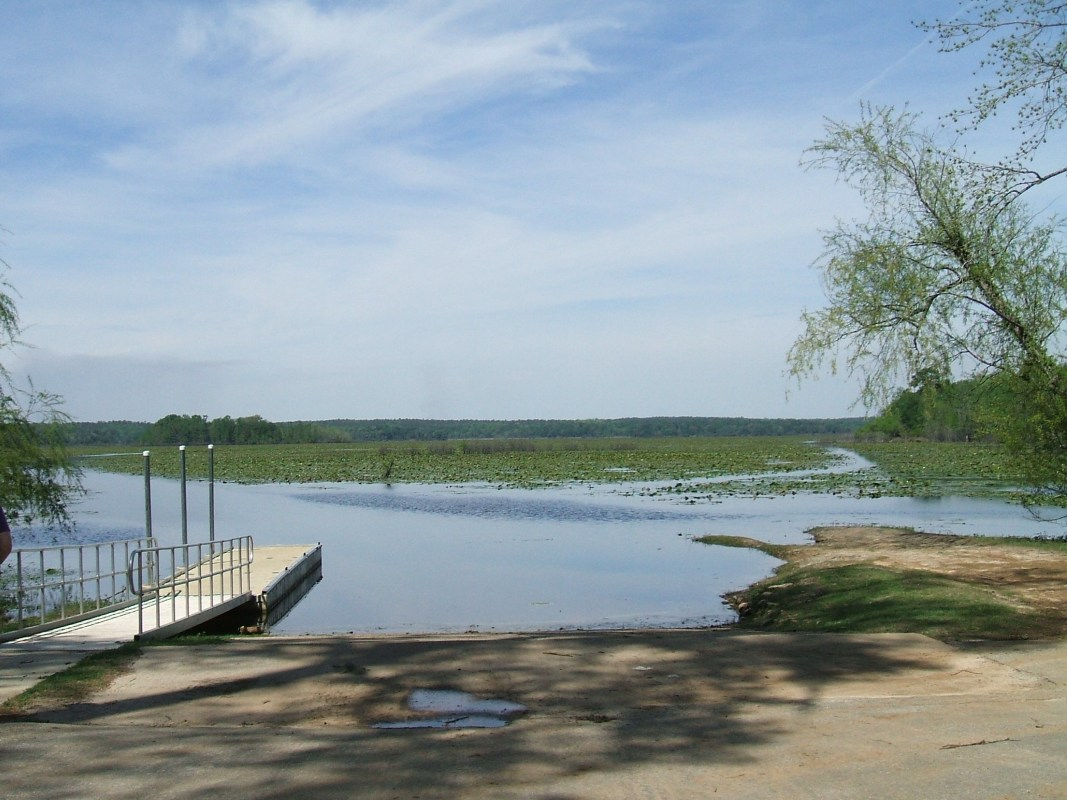
Boat ramp, Lake Iamonia Landing

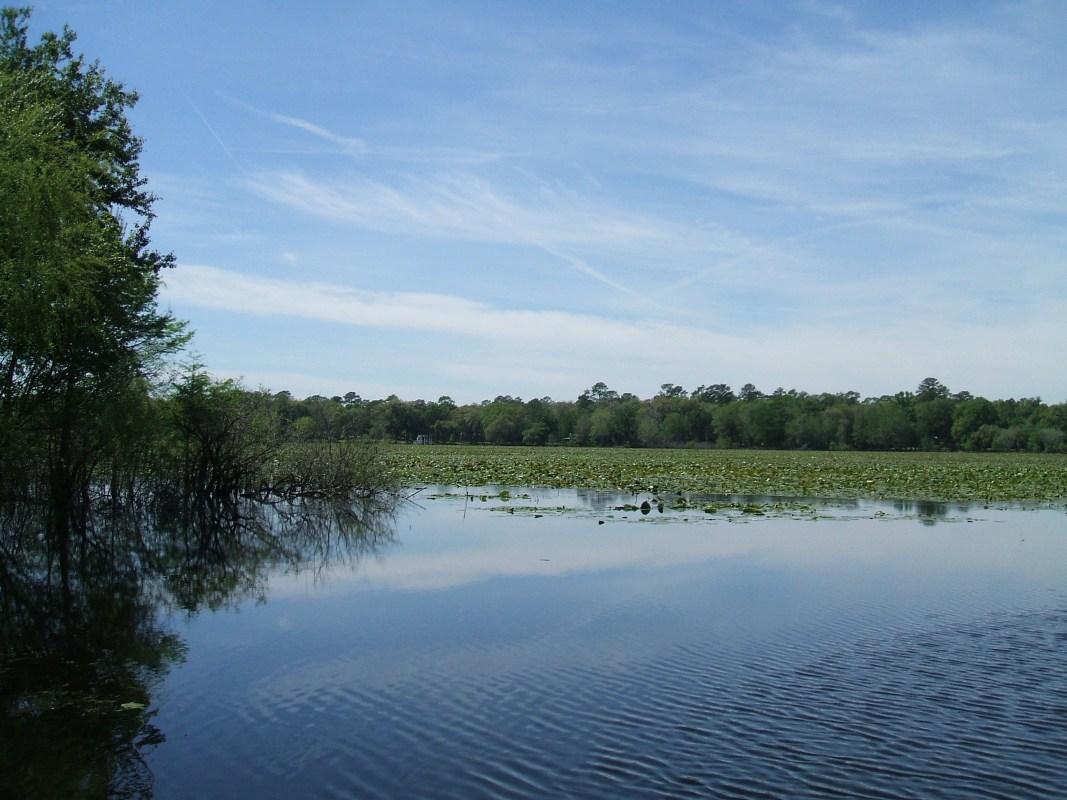
View from north shore

== See also ==
- Tall Timbers Research Station and Land Conservancy
