= Luna Plantation =

Coordinates: 30.5079°N 84.3359°W

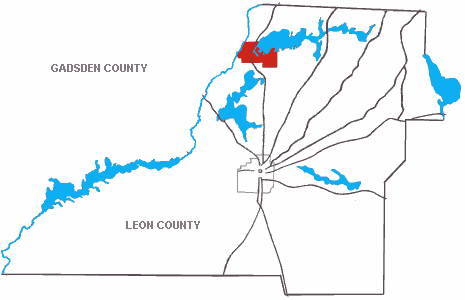
Luna Plantation in 1947

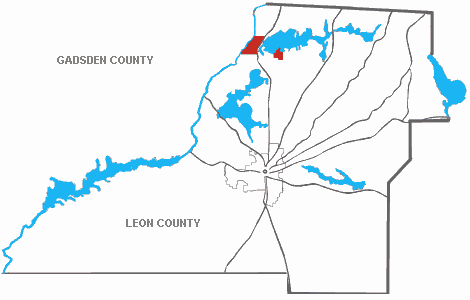
Luna Plantation in 1967

Luna Plantation was a quail hunting plantation located in northeastern Leon County, Florida, United States established by Lloyd C. Griscom.

Lloyd C. Griscom was the son of Clement A. Griscom from Philadelphia, Pennsylvania. Clement was a shipping magnate, President of the Red Star Line and American Line.

Almost four years after the death of Clement A. Griscom, on October 19, 1916 Horseshoe Plantation was divided up and part sold. Lloyd C. Griscom, Clement's son received 4,000 acres (1,600 ha) on the west side naming it Luna Plantation while his sister Frances C. Griscom, a sportswoman, received 7,000 acres (2,800 ha) of the old plantation to the east and named it Water Oak Plantation. Frances Griscom won the 1900 United States Women's Amateur Golf Championship.

== Adjacent plantations ==
Adjacent plantations 1947:

- Water Oak Plantation to the east
- Orchard Pond Plantation to the south
- Ayavalla Plantation to the south

Lloyd C. Griscom purchased the Tallahassee Democrat in 1929 owning it until his death in 1958. His widow owned the paper from 1958 through 1965.

Adjacent plantations 1967:

- Kinhega Lodge to the east
- Avayalla Plantation to the south

== Fossil discovery ==
In 1916 during a well digging at Luna Plantation, equipment hit a bone layer from the Miocene period of some 14 million years containing several fossils. Skeletal remains found were of ancient horses, camels, rhinoceros, bear dogs, and ancient dog-like ancestors of the dogs of today. The fossil site was later abandoned due to poisonous gases. This site became known as the Griscom Plantation site.
