= Mossview Plantation =

Coordinates: 30.5531°N 84.2785°W

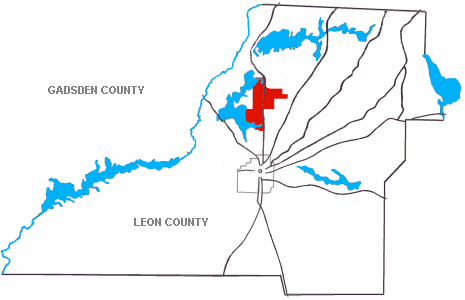
Location of Mossview Plantation in 1915

Mossview Plantation was a medium-sized forced-labor farm that grew cotton on 2,204 acres (8.92 km^{2}) located in Leon County, Florida, United States established by Amos Whitehead.

== Location ==
Mossview Plantation was located in north central Leon County on the southeast shore of Lake Jackson and just north of Live Oak Plantation

== Plantation specifics ==
The Leon County Florida 1860 Agricultural Census shows that Mossview Plantation had the following:

- Improved Land: 1,200 acres (4.9 km^{2})
- Unimproved Land: 1,200 acres (4.9 km^{2})
- Cash value of plantation: $20,000
- Cash value of farm implements/machinery: $800
- Cash value of farm animals: $3600
- Number of slaves: 58
- Bushels of corn: 2000
- Bales of cotton: 80

== The Owner ==
Amos Whitehead was from Burke County, Georgia. On June 18, 1858, he married Miss Margaret M. Bradford, daughter of Dr. Edward Bradford of Pine Hill Plantation at Pine Hill. The Rev. Dr. Nash officiated.

In 1915 Mossview would become Meridian Plantation having been sold to Arthur B. Lapsley of Pomfret, Connecticut.
