= Oaklawn Plantation (Leon County, Florida) =

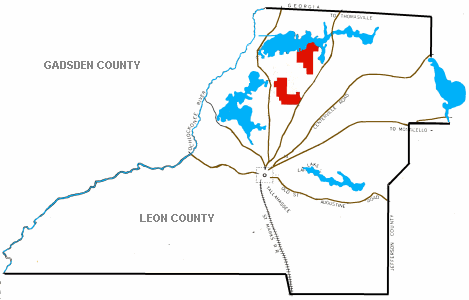
Location of Oaklawn Plantation.

Oaklawn Plantation was a large forced-labor farm of 5326 acres (21½ km^{2}) in northern Leon County in the U.S. state of Florida. It was established around 1850 by Captain William Lester (born December 24, 1790) of Burke County, Georgia.

== Location ==
Oaklawn Plantation was located on two tracts of land. The first and northernmost tract would become what is now parts of Killearn Lakes Plantation and the private hunting preserve of Horseshoe Plantation and extending south to Bradfordville. The second and southernmost tract would become properties on Ox Bottom Rd and edge Thomasville Road.

== Plantation statistics ==
The Leon County Florida 1860 Agricultural Census shows that Oaklawn Plantation had the following:

- Improved Land: 1200 acres (5 km^{2})
- Unimproved Land: 4440 acres (18 km^{2})
- Cash value of plantation: $26,720
- Cash value of farm implements/machinery: $600
- Cash value of farm animals: $5,925
- Number of slaves: 156
- Bushels of corn: 5000
- Bales of cotton: 300

== Plantation home ==
The plantation home was known as The Lester-Lauder House. The house was an antebellum I-house with Carolina type porch and enclosed rear shed rooms.

== The owner ==
In 1834, prior to coming to Florida, Lester became the head of vigilante committee called "The Regulators" during the funeral of a Mr. Roundtree. In May 1846, the Florida Superior Court the grand jury investigated the deaths of two Georgia citizens at the hands of The Regulators. Judge Scarborough instructed the grand jury not to indict The Regulators for murder, but to issue a warning that they would be indicted the next time. The grand jury called on the officers of The Regulators to dismiss the body that was no longer needed for the purpose it was organized.

William Lester was a signee to the Southern Rights Association of Centreville District on secession from the Union for the protection of Southern interests and the vindication of Southern rights to preserve and protect the Constitution in its purity as the basis of Federal compact, and the only foundation on which the Union of the States was made, or on which that Union should be preserved.

By 1870, he owned 5,000 acres (20 km^{2}) of land in Texas, Georgia, and Florida.

Lester Cemetery had an ornamental iron fence. An obelisk marked the location of Captain Lester and his wife Rhoda. A total of 11 interments with brick vaults were at this cemetery before its removal. Pieces of pearlware sherd were found around the graveyard.

In 1997, the Lester-Lauder house was razed to the ground to make way for a commercial interest called Bannerman Crossing.
