= Clement Griscom =

American shipping magnate and financier

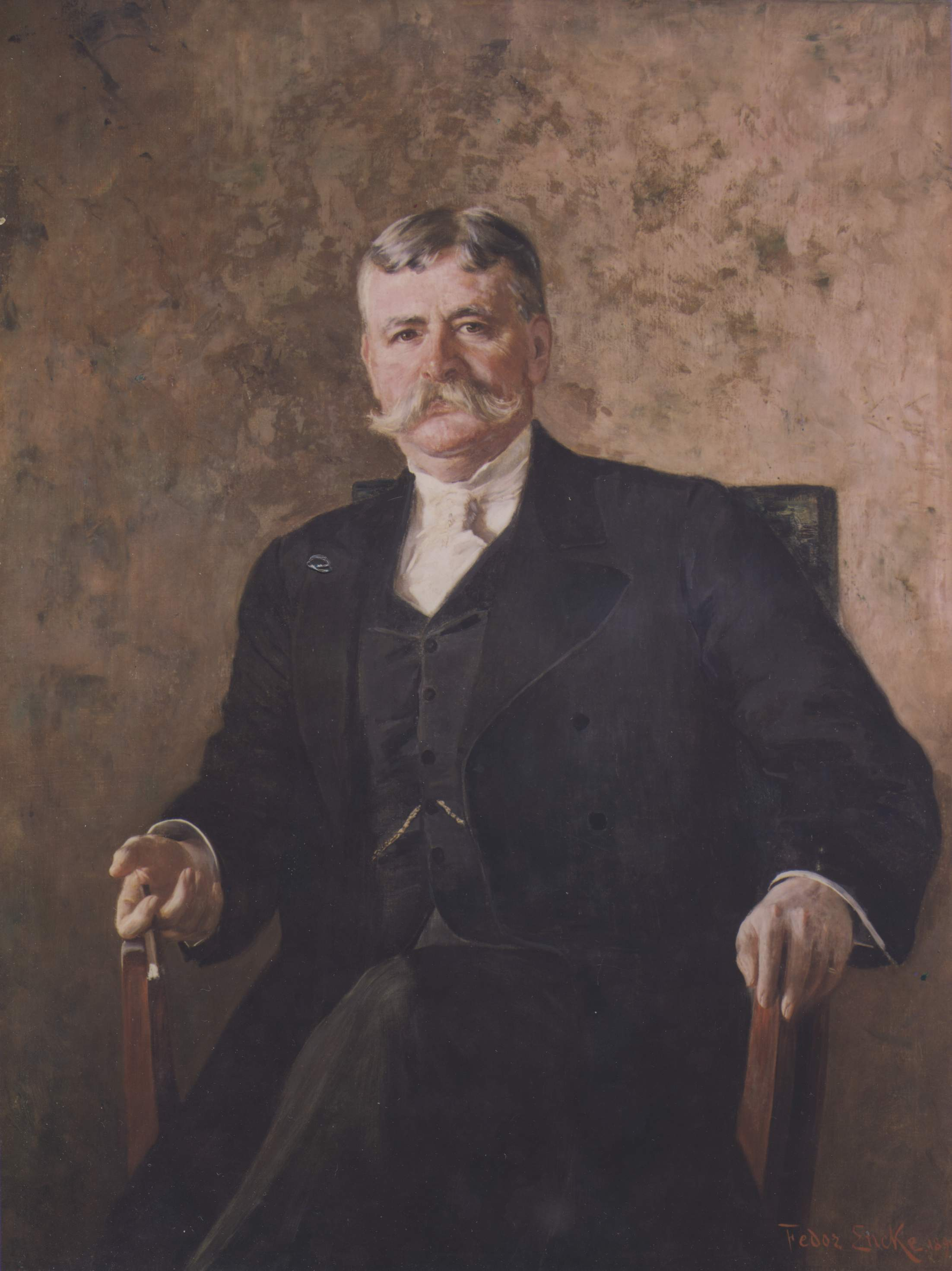
Clement Acton Griscom by Fedor Encke painted in 1899.

Clement Acton Griscom (March 15, 1841 – November 10, 1912) was an American shipping magnate and financier.

Griscom was "without question, the key figure in American transatlantic shipping" by 1900.

== Biography ==
Griscom was born in 1841 to a long-established and prominent Philadelphia family. His father was Dr John D Griscom, a well-known local physician, and his mother was Margaret Acton Lloyd, a direct descendant of Thomas Lloyd. He attended local Quaker schools, as well as Central High School. In 1857, aged 16, he went to work as a clerk at Peter Wright and Sons, a Quaker shipping firm in Philadelphia. He became a partner in the business in 1863.

In 1872 he became vice-president of the International Navigation Co., which operated three ships. Eventually the Red Star Line was absorbed into the business. In 1888 he was promoted to president of the International Navigation Co. Griscom was "without question, the key figure in American transatlantic shipping" by 1900.

By 1901 he was described in the press as a millionaire.

In 1902, with financing from J. Pierpont Morgan, the companies were merged into the International Mercantile Marine shipping trust company, which operated 136 vessels over five transatlantic lines. Griscom served as president of IMM from 1902 until 1904, when he retired due to ill health. He remained as chairman, but was succeeded as president by J Bruce Ismay, who immediately removed headquarters to New York and reduced staffing levels.

Griscom also served on the board of directors of the Pennsylvania Railroad and United States Steel.

Dolobran (1881), his country house in Haverford, Pennsylvania, is one of architect Frank Furness's most significant houses. Furness also designed interiors for two of Griscom's American Line steamships, the S.S. St. Louis (1894–95) and the S.S. St. Paul (1894–95). Griscom established and owned a private hunting plantation north of Tallahassee, Florida called Horseshoe Plantation.

== Death and legacy ==
Griscom died of a stroke at the age of 71. In 1914 his widow erected a fountain in his memory in the Watch Hill section of Westerly, Rhode Island. It featured a bronze statue of the Niantic chief Ninigret by the sculptor Enid Yandell.

== Family ==
Griscom married Frances Canby Biddle (1840-1923), from a prominent Philadelphia Quaker family, in 1862, and they had six children:

- John Acton Griscom (1863-1865).
- Helen Biddle Griscom (1866-1950), married (1889) Samuel Bettle.
- Clement Acton Griscom Jr. (1868-1918), shipping executive, married (1889) Genevieve Sprigg Ludlow. Their children were Ludlow, Joyce, and Acton.
- Rodman Ellison Griscom (1870-1944), stockbroker, married (1897) Anne Starr.
- Lloyd Carpenter Griscom (1872-1959), diplomat, married (1901) Elizabeth Duer Bronson.
- Frances C. "Pansy" Griscom (1879-1974), champion golfer.

== Gallery ==
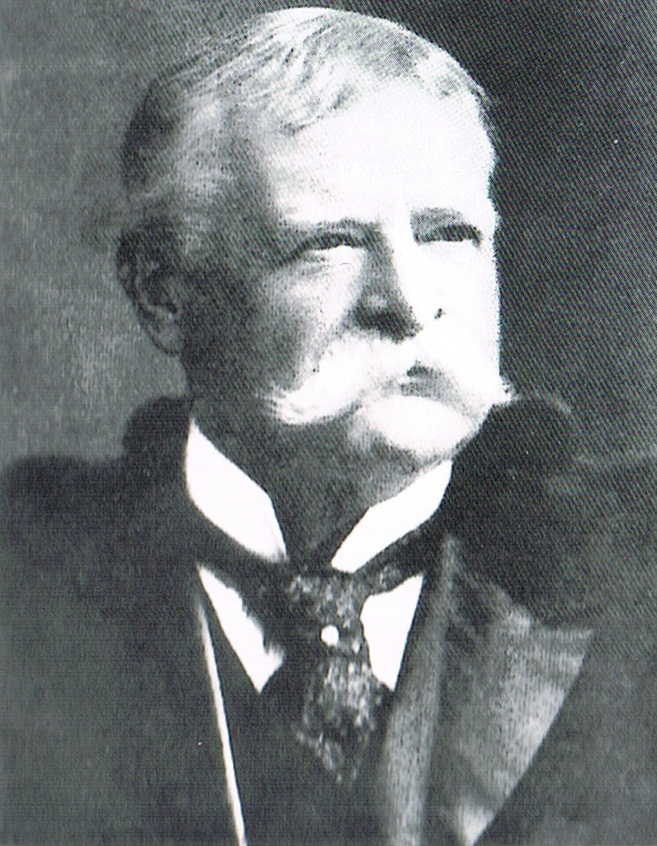
Clement Griscom, 1890s.

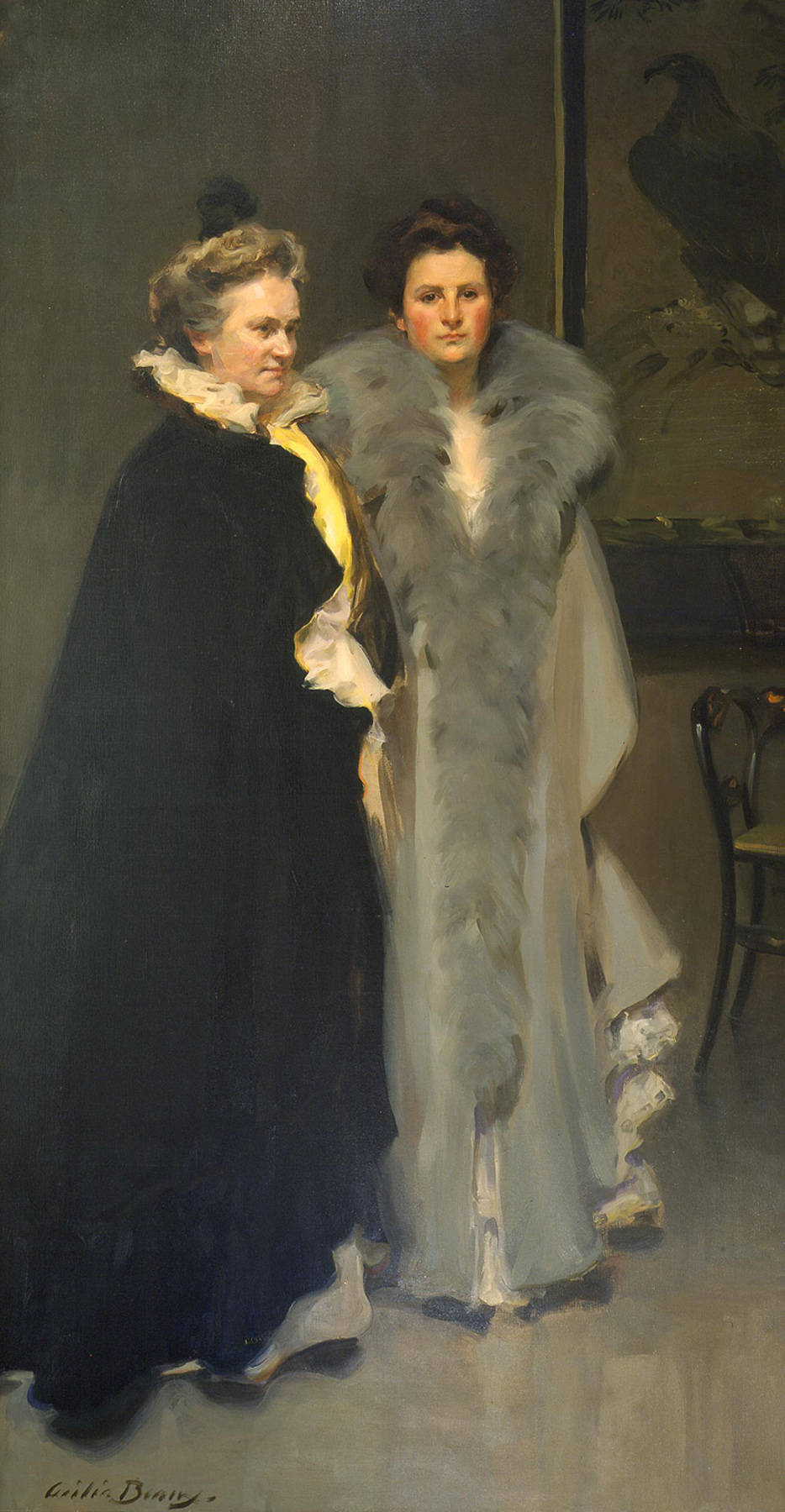
Mother and Daughter (Mrs. Clement Griscom and Frances C. Griscom) (1898) by Cecilia Beaux.

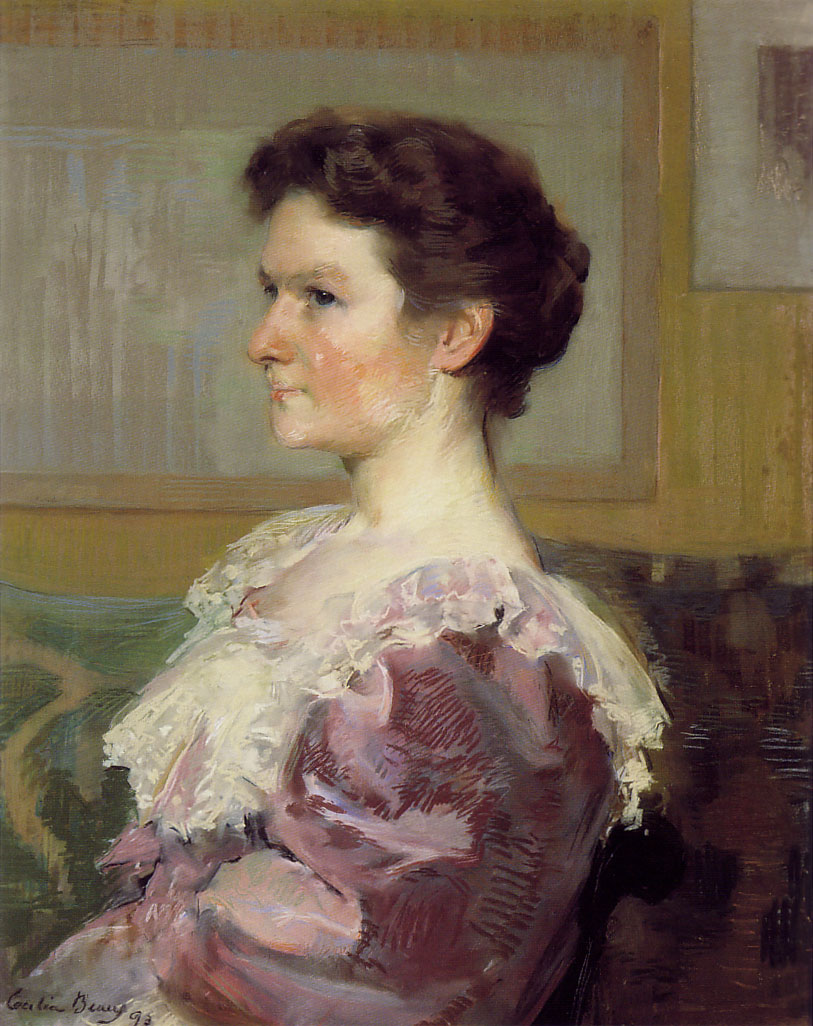
Helen Biddle Griscom (1893) by Cecilia Beaux.

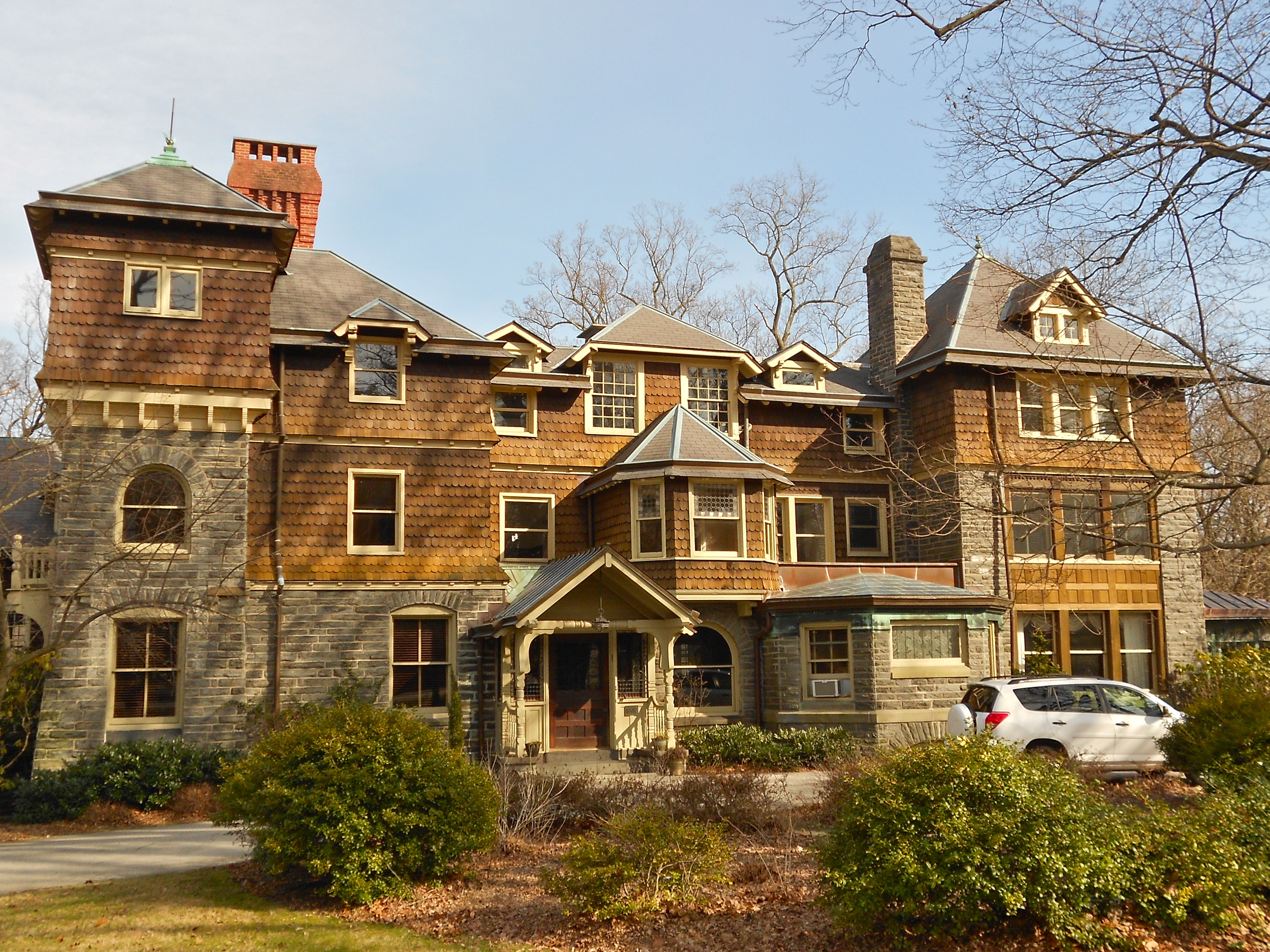
Dolobran, Haverford, Pennsylvania (1881), Frank Furness, architect.

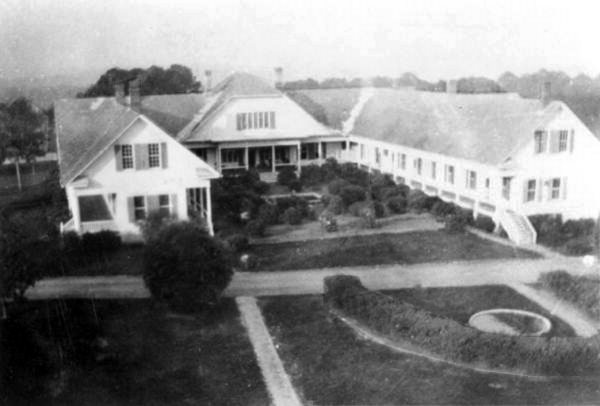
"Horseshoe Plantation," Leon County, Florida.
