= Lloyd C. Griscom =

American diplomat (1872–1959)

Lloyd Carpenter Griscom
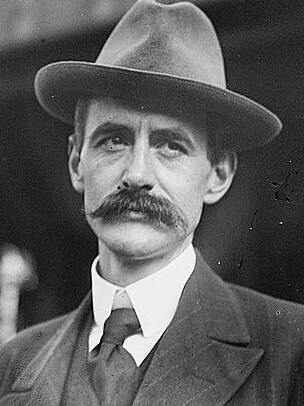
- Griscom in 1900

United States Ambassador to Italy
- In office March 17, 1907 – June 14, 1909
- President: Theodore Roosevelt; William Howard Taft
- Preceded by: Henry White
- Succeeded by: John G. A. Leishman

United States Ambassador to Brazil
- In office June 6, 1906 – January 2, 1907
- President: Theodore Roosevelt
- Preceded by: David Eugene Thompson
- Succeeded by: Irving Bedell Dudley

United States Minister to Japan
- In office June 22, 1903 – November 19, 1905
- President: Theodore Roosevelt
- Preceded by: Alfred Buck
- Succeeded by: Luke E. Wright (as Ambassador to Japan)

United States Minister to Iran
- In office December 16, 1901 – December 24, 1902
- President: Theodore Roosevelt
- Preceded by: Herbert W. Bowen
- Succeeded by: Richmond Pearson

Personal details
- Born: November 4, 1872 Riverton, New Jersey, U.S.
- Died: February 8, 1959 (aged 86) Thomasville, Georgia, U.S.
- Party: Republican
- Spouses: Elizabeth Duer Bronson (m. 1901; died 1914) Audrey M.E. Crosse (m. 1929)
- Relations: Frances Griscom (sister)
- Parent(s): Clement Griscom; Frances Canby Biddle
- Education: University of Pennsylvania; New York Law School

Lloyd Carpenter Griscom (November 4, 1872 – February 8, 1959) was an American lawyer, diplomat, and newspaper publisher.

== Early life ==
Lloyd Griscom was born on November 4, 1872, at Riverton, New Jersey. He was the son of shipping magnate Clement Griscom (1841–1912) and Frances Canby Biddle (1840–1923). Among his siblings was Frances Griscom, an amateur golfer who won the 1900 U.S. Women's Amateur held at Shinnecock Hills Golf Club in Southampton, New York, She and played in the 1898 Amateur at the Ardsley Club.

He graduated in 1891 from the law department of University of Pennsylvania and a member of the Sigma chapter of the Zeta Psi Fraternity. Griscom continued his legal studies at the New York Law School. He later received a Doctor of Laws from the University of Pennsylvania in 1907.

== Career ==
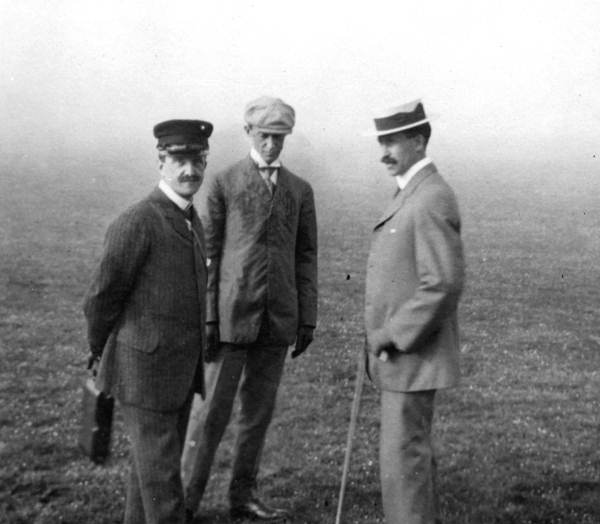
A photograph from 1909, at Centocelle Field outside of Rome, Italy, with King Victor Emmanuel III, Wilbur Wright, and Ambassador Griscom(*error/ this is actually Orville Wright), 1909.

In 1893–1894, Griscom served in the United Kingdom as secretary to Ambassador Thomas Bayard; he was admitted to the bar in 1896, and the following year in 1897 he was deputy district attorney of New York. During the Spanish–American War, he served as captain and assistant quartermaster.

While serving a short period as Secretary of Legation and chargé d' affaires at Constantinople, the 28-year-old Griscom made a notable achievement in 1900 by persuading the Sultan to purchase what would become the Ottoman cruiser Mecidiye from the American shipbuilder William Cramp & Sons. Shortly afterward, he was appointed Minister to Persia in 1901. He held the corresponding post in Japan (1902–1906) and was ambassador to Brazil (1906–1907) and to Italy (1907–1909).

In 1911, he became a member of the law firm of Beekman, Menken, and Griscom, New York City, and was thereafter active in local Republican politics, helping found The New York Young Republican Club. He contributed numerous articles to the Philadelphia Sunday Press on travel in Central America. In 1917, he was appointed a major in the department of the Adjutant-General of the United States Army and afterward became Assistant Adjutant-General. During the war, he served as liaison officer to General John J. Pershing, commander of the American Expeditionary Forces of the U.S. Army. He was a close friend of Col. Theodore Roosevelt Jr.

Griscom's primary significance was as an advocate for globalized free trade as a means to promote peaceful development in accordance with his Quaker faith. In the Middle East he worked for better relations between Muslims and Christians, and he played a major role in the relief effort in Italy after the 1908 Messina earthquake took 50,000 lives. Prior to the death of Secretary of State John Hay in 1905, Griscom was offered the post of First Assistant Secretary of State. The appointment of Elihu Root to succeed Hay nullified Griscom's appointment to the State Department position.

In 1940, he published a memoir of his professional life, Diplomatically Speaking, covering his life from youth and his student days at the University of Pennsylvania to his homecoming as an Army officer after the end of World War One in 1919. In the first year it sold more than 90,000 copies in America before it was published in England. The Rt. Hon. Leo Amery, M.P., commented that "My old friend Lloyd Griscom gives a delightfully breezy picture as seen through American eyes of Edwardian England, of the diplomatic world, of many countries."

=== Later life ===
Following his retirement from public service, he bought and became the publisher of several Long Island newspapers, including the East Norwich Enterprise, the North Hempstead Record, and the Nassau Daily Star. Griscom purchased the Tallahassee [Florida] Democrat in 1929 owning it until his death in 1959. He was a cousin by marriage to Wolcott Gibbs, who later worked at several of Griscom's Long Island newspapers.

Griscom studied painting under John Singer Sargent.

== Personal life ==
On November 2, 1901, Griscom was married to Elizabeth Duer Bronson (1877–1914), the daughter of lawyer Frederic Bronson. Her mother, Sarah Gracie King, was the granddaughter of U.S. Representative James Gore King and William Alexander Duer. Through Elizabeth's uncle, Frederick Gore King, she was the first cousin of Alice Gore King. The Bronsons lived at 174 Madison Avenue and had a country home, "Verna" in Southport, Connecticut (which later became the Fairfield Country Day School). Together, they were the parents of:

- Bronson Winthrop Griscom (1907–1977), who married Sophie Gay, the niece of painter Walter Gay, in 1931.
- Lloyd Preston Griscom (b. 1913).

After her death in 1914, he remarried to Audrey Margaret Elizabeth Crosse (1900–1975) in England on October 3, 1929. Audrey was the daughter of Marlborough Crosse and the niece of C. E. Barnwell Ewins of Marston Trussell Hall in Leicestershire. His best man at the wedding was Brig. Gen. Sir Charles Delmé-Radcliffe (who married the daughter of Sir Frederick Treves, 1st Baronet), who was British military attaché at Rome while Griscom was envoy there.

Griscom died of a stroke on February 8, 1959, at Archbold Memorial Hospital in Thomasville, Georgia while visiting his sister Frances who was a patient there. After his death, his widow, who inherited the bulk of his estate including the Leon county Luna Plantation as well as the Tallahassee Democrat, which she ran from 1958 through 1965.

Diplomatic posts
Preceded by Herbert W. Bowen	United States Minister to Persia; December 16, 1901–December 24, 1902	Succeeded by Richmond Pearson
Preceded by Alfred Buck	United States Minister to Japan; June 22, 1903-November 19, 1905	Succeeded by Luke E. Wright
Preceded by David E. Thompson	United States Ambassador to Brazil; 6 June 1906–2 January 1907	Succeeded by Irving B. Dudley
Preceded by Henry White	United States Ambassador to Italy; March 17, 1907-June 14, 1909	Succeeded by John G. A. Leishman
