= Frances C. Griscom =

American golfer (1879–1973)

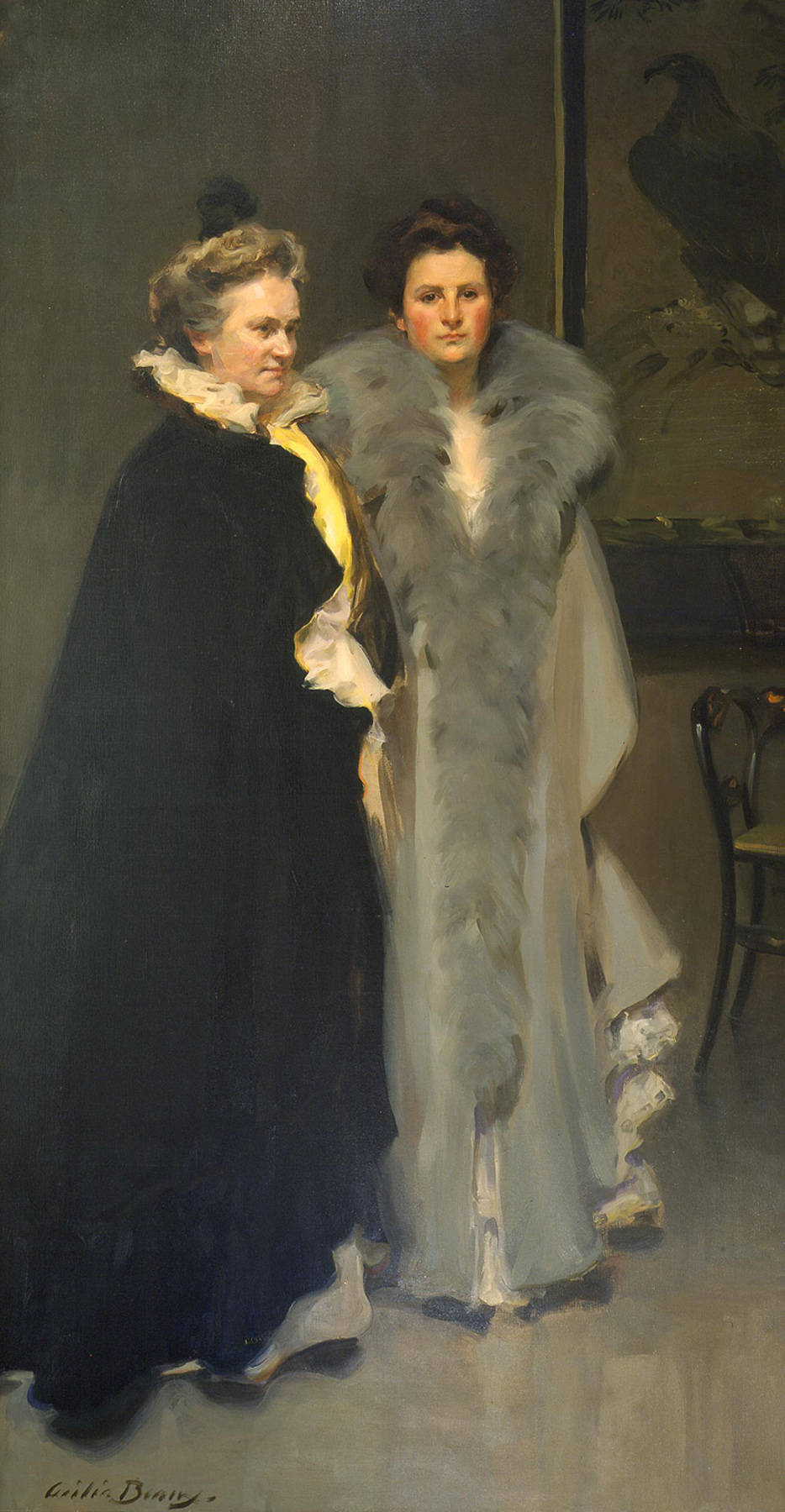
Mother and Daughter (Mrs. Clement Griscom and Frances C. Griscom) by Cecilia Beaux, 1898.

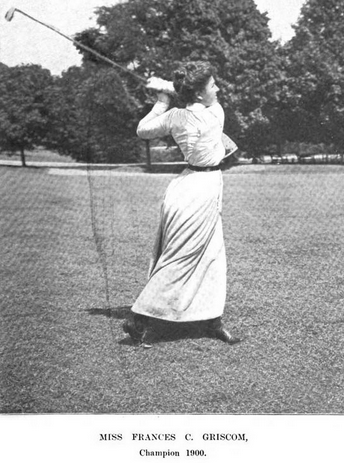
Frances C. Griscom, from a 1901 publication.

Frances Canby Griscom (19 April 1879 – March 30, 1973) was an American amateur golfer from Philadelphia, Pennsylvania, United States. She won the 1900 U.S. Women's Amateur tournament that was held at Shinnecock Hills Golf Club, Southampton, Long Island, New York.

== Formative years and personal life ==
Griscom was the sister of diplomat Lloyd Carpenter Griscom and daughter of shipping magnate Clement Griscom as well as the owner of the 7,000-acre (28 km^{2}) Water Oak Plantation, a hunting plantation in Bradfordville located north of Tallahassee, Florida. Griscom was a loyal contributor to the Lake McBride School, a school for African Americans in Leon County, Florida that was not far from her winter home.

== Golf career ==
Griscom won the 1900 U.S. Women's Amateur held at Shinnecock Hills Golf Club, Southampton, Long Island, New York. She also played in the 1898 Amateur at the Ardsley Club. and in 1905, Griscom competed in an informal match between teams of American and British golfers with 1904 Amateur champion Georgianna Bishop, Harriot and Margaret Curtis.

In 1900, Griscom also captured the Philadelphia Amateur championship. In 1911, she accepted an invitation to play in the inaugural Berthellyn Cup at the nearby Huntingdon Valley Country Club in Philadelphia suburb. She advanced to match play but lost in the quarterfinals to tournament host and founder, Mrs. Caleb F. Fox.

Griscom donated the putting cleat that she felt had won her the 1900 championship to the USGA museum in 1954 as before she was still playing golf with it.
