= Plantations of Leon County, Florida =

The forced-labor farms of Leon County were numerous and vast. Leon County, Florida, was a hub of cotton production. From the 1820s through 1850s Leon County's fertile red clay soils and long growing season attracted cotton planters from Georgia, Virginia, Maryland, North and South Carolina, among other states as well as countries abroad.

== Enslaved workers in Leon County ==
For some time before the early stages of the Civil War Leon County was the fifth-largest producer of cotton in Georgia and Florida. Another source states that Leon County led the state in cotton production. Because of this, in 1840, there were only 654 adult white males, but 3980 people "engaged in agriculture". In 1860, 73% of the population of Leon County consisted of enslaved black persons; as was true elsewhere in the South, the value of those enslaved persons far exceeded the value of all the land in the county. Leon County had more enslaved people than any other county in Florida, and it was, therefore, the wealthiest county in Florida. It was also the center of Florida's slave trade.

== Forced-labor farms in 1860 ==
Note: Value = plantation value in United States dollars. TA = total area. IA = improved area. UA = unimproved area. Corn = in bushels. Cotton = bales of cotton

Leon County Plantations 1860
Enslaver	Value	TA (acre)	IA	UA	Enslaved people	Corn	Cotton	Notes
William Alderman	$5000	980 acres (4.0 km^{2})	500 acres (2 km^{2})	480 acres (1.9 km^{2})	36	3000	75	
Silas D. Allen	$2000	550 acres (2.2 km^{2})	250 acres (1 km^{2})	300 acres (1.2 km^{2})	22	1000	180	
Jesse Averett, Sr.	N/A	19,601 acres (79 km^{2})	1,200 acres (5 km^{2})	680 acres (2.8 km^{2})	60	2500	80	
William Bailey	$42,670	2,510 acres (10 km^{2})	825 acres (3.3 km^{2})	564 acres (2.3 km^{2})	75	4000	352	
Bannerman	$14,475	1,440 acres (6 km^{2})	700 acres (2.8 km^{2})	840 acres (3.4 km^{2})	67	4000	120	
Barrow Hill	$10,000	3,990 acres (16 km^{2})	2,590 acres (10 km^{2})	1,400 acres (6 km^{2})	71	3200	204	
S. A. Belton	$12,000	N/A	600 acres (2.4 km^{2})	400 acres (1.6 km^{2})	N/A	500	N/A	
Bellevue Plantation	$10,000	520 acres (2.1 km^{2})	470 acres (1.9 km^{2})	50 acres (0.2 km^{2})	24	N/A	N/A	
Betton Hill	$00,000	0000	0000	00	0000	000	000	
Blakely	$9000	900 acres (3.6 km^{2})	500 acres (2 km^{2})	400	N/A	3000	40	
William D. Bloxham	$7000	1,400 acres (6 km^{2})	600 acres (2.4 km^{2})	800 acres (3.2 km^{2})	52	2500	100	
J. R. Bradford	$1300	N/A	700 acres (2.8 km^{2})	300 acres (1.2 km^{2})	N/A	1500	75	
Burgesstown	$22,000	8,100 acres (33 km^{2})	3,800 acres (15 km^{2})	4,300 acres (17 km^{2})	274	1300	825	
William H. Branch	$13,375	1,070 acres (4 km^{2})	670 acres (2.7 km^{2})	500 acres (2 km^{2})	57	3000	120	
William A. Carr	$31,000	2000 acres (8 km^{2})	1000 acres (4 km^{2})	1,000 acres (4 km^{2})	77	5000	260	
Casa de Laga	$15,000	1,228 acres (5 km^{2})	800 acres (3.2 km^{2})	428 acres (1.7 km^{2})	70	3000	200	
Josesph Chaires	$50,000	3,800 acres (15 km^{2})	1,400 acres (6 km^{2})	2,400 acres (10 km^{2})	130	5000	200	
Chemonie	$18,400	1,840 acres (7 km^{2})	1000 acres (4 km^{2})	800 acres (3.2 km^{2})	64	5000	200	
J. B. Christie	$12,000	1,420 acres (6 km^{2})	600 acres (2.4 km^{2})	800 acres (3.2 km^{2})	37	1500	80	
Charles Cole	$7680	N/A	600 acres (2.4 km^{2})	300 acres (1.2 km^{2})	30	1500	85	
Henry Copeland	$10,000	N/A	300 acres (1.2 km^{2})	200 acres (0.8 km^{2})	55	3000	81	
John A. Craig	$20,000	1,150 acres (5 km^{2})	600 acres (2.4 km^{2})	550 acres (2.2 km^{2})	44	3500	150	
William P. Craig	$13,000	1,150 acres (5 km^{2})	690 acres (2.8 km^{2})	350 acres (1.4 km^{2})	38	1000	62	
Alex Cromartie	$12,600	1,255 acres (5 km^{2})	600 acres (2.4 km^{2})	700 acres (2.8 km^{2})	53	4000	90	
John Cromartie	$5760	960 acres (3.9 km^{2})	500 acres (2 km^{2})	460 acres (1.9 km^{2})	52	1500	37	
J. Q. Cromartie	$13,000	1,320 acres (5 km^{2})	300 acres (1.2 km^{2})	840 acres (3.4 km^{2})	40	3000	50	

Leon County Plantations 1860 (Continued)
Enslaver	Value	TA	IA	UA	Enslaved people	Corn	Cotton	Notes
Edgewood	N/A	N/A	N/A	N/A	N/A	N/A	N/A	
El Destino (partly in Jefferson County)	$17,000 (1832)	7,638 acres (30.91 km^{2})						
Evergreen Hills	$53,600	6,700 acres (27 km^{2})	3,600 acres (15 km^{2})	3,100 acres (13 km^{2})	135	6000	350	
Francis Eppes	$24,000	1,920 acres (8 km^{2})	950 acres (3.8 km^{2})	970 acres (3.9 km^{2})	70	3000	70	
A. A. Fisher	N/A	1,144 acres (5 km^{2})	625 acres (2.5 km^{2})	475 acres (1.9 km^{2})	46	3000	105	
R. N. Fisher	$11,800	1,080 acres (4 km^{2})	500 acres (2 km^{2})	580 acres (2.3 km^{2})	45	3000	100	
Dr. George Galphin	$12,500	989 acres (4.0 km^{2})	500 acres (2 km^{2})	500 acres (2.0 km^{2})	50	1300	75	
C. B. Gamble	$10,000	N/A	600 acres (2.4 km^{2})	240 acres (1.0 km^{2})	N/A	2500	60	
William Germany	$20,000	3,240 acres (13 km^{2})	1000 acres (4 km^{2})	1,240 acres (5 km^{2})	40	1500	47	
Goodwood	$33,640	1,675 acres (7 km^{2})	1,050 acres (4 km^{2})	625 acres (2.5 km^{2})	58	2500	150	
William A. Harvin	$11,500	N/A	600 acres (2.4 km^{2})	550 acres (2.2 km^{2})	36	3000	91	
Alex B. Hawkins	$38,700	2000 acres (8 km^{2})	1,130 acres (5 km^{2})	860 acres (3.5 km^{2})	51	1800	93	
Richard Hayward	$62,680	N/A	7,444 acres (30 km^{2})	450 acres (1.8 km^{2})	51	2000	150	
Griffin W. Holland	$30,000	1,600 acres (6 km^{2})	1,200 acres (5 km^{2})	1,400 acres (6 km^{2})	95	7000	225	
Horseshoe Plantation	See (Pine Hill)							
House Place	$16,600	1,800 acres (7 km^{2})	900 acres (3.6 km^{2})	900 acres (3.6 km^{2})	47	3000	216	
Edward Houstoun	$25,000	N/A	900 acres (3.6 km^{2})	3,600 acres (15 km^{2})	78	3500	180	
Ingleside	$25,000	2,620 acres (11 km^{2})	1500 acres (6 km^{2})	1,140 acres (5 km^{2})	116	7000	181	
James A. Kirksey	$33,000	2,600 acres (11 km^{2})	1,320 acres (5 km^{2})	1,280 acres (5 km^{2})	180	6000	454	
La Grange	$55,200	4,150 acres (17 km^{2})	3,150 acres (13 km^{2})	1000 acres (4 km^{2})	232	N/A	N/A	
T. B. Lamar	$1500	1,120 acres (5 km^{2})	1,200 acres (5 km^{2})	750 acres (3 km^{2})	41	2000	100	
Thomas J. Laversage	$8000	1,560 acres (6 km^{2})	1,700 acres (7 km^{2})	300 acres (1.2 km^{2})	48	2000	70	
Live Oak	$4000	1,560 acres (6 km^{2})	820 acres (3.3 km^{2})	260 acres (1.1 km^{2})	68	2000	73	
Ellen C. Long	$13,000	N/A	700 acres (2.8 km^{2})	500 acres (2 km^{2})	52	1800	120	
Daniel B. Meginniss	$40,000	1,600 acres (6 km^{2})	800 acres (3.2 km^{2})	810 acres (3.3 km^{2})	70	3000	150	
John Miller	$35,000	2,517 acres (10 km^{2})	1,400 acres (6 km^{2})	1,300 acres (5 km^{2})	80	5000	180	

Leon County Plantations 1860 (Continued)
Labor Camp	Value	TA	IA	UA	Enslaved People	Corn	Cotton	Notes
Miccosukee	$35,000	2,517 acres (10 km^{2})	1,400 acres (6 km^{2})	1,300 acres (5 km^{2})	80	5000	180	
John C. Montford	$800	1,080 acres (4 km^{2})	500 acres (2 km^{2})	540 acres (2.2 km^{2})	35	2000	41	
Mossview	$20,000	2,204 acres (9 km^{2})	1,200 acres (5 km^{2})	1,200 acres (5 km^{2})	80	2000	80	
William S. Murray	$8000	1,120 acres (5 km^{2})	520 acres (2.1 km^{2})	400 acres (1.6 km^{2})	33	2500	45	
Oaklawn	$26,720	5,640 acres (23 km^{2})	1,200 acres (5 km^{2})	4,440 acres (18 km^{2})	20	5000	300	
Orchard Pond	$31,000	3,844 acres (16 km^{2})	1,300 acres (5 km^{2})	2,544 acres (10 km^{2})	118	4500	167	
M. D. Papy	$9000	1,200 acres (5 km^{2})	500 acres (2 km^{2})	700 acres (2.8 km^{2})	43	3000	54	
William Perkins	$15,300	1,568 acres (6 km^{2})	900 acres (3.6 km^{2})	800 acres (3.2 km^{2})	42	2500	93	
Julian S. Pettes	$3000	N/A	350 acres (1.4 km^{2})	800 acres (3.2 km^{2})	N/A	3000	75	
Pine Hill	$28,000	3,270 acres (13 km^{2})	1500 acres (6 km^{2})	1,770 acres (7 km^{2})	130	4000	225	
Ponder	$48,000	5000 acres (20 km^{2})	4,756 acres (19 km^{2})	5,756 acres (23 km^{2})	99	8500	206	
L. S. Raines	$10,000	1000 acres (4 km^{2})	500 acres (2 km^{2})	500 acres (2.0 km^{2})	43	1500	75	
Thomas Randall	$40,000	N/A	800 acres (3.2 km^{2})	2,800 acres (11 km^{2})	38	2500	75	
W. F. Robertson	$12,000	1,320 acres (5 km^{2})	600 acres (2.4 km^{2})	720 acres (2.9 km^{2})	30	2000	100	
J. A. J. Roney	$27,000	N/A	1,580 acres (6 km^{2})	550 acres (2.2 km^{2})	77	6000	198	
G. W. Scott	$4000	60 acres (240,000 m^{2})	50 acres (200,000 m^{2})	5 acres (20,000 m^{2})	N/A	N/A	N/A	
R. G. Shepard	$24,000	1,400 acres (6 km^{2})	800 acres (3.2 km^{2})	600 acres (2.4 km^{2})	90	1000	225	
Solomon Sills	$5000	840 acres (3.4 km^{2})	225 acres (0.9 km^{2})	N/A	26	97	1800	
Smithwick	$10,000	520 acres (2.1 km^{2})	350 acres (1.4 km^{2})	250 acres (1 km^{2})	N/A	80	1500	
Southwood	N/A	N/A	N/A	N/A	N/A	N/A	N/A	
Daniel Switzer	$6000	620 acres (2.5 km^{2})	300 acres (1.2 km^{2})	320 acres (1.3 km^{2})	N/A	N/A	N/A	
Tuscawilla	$36,000	3000 acres (12 km^{2})	1500 acres (6 km^{2})	1500 acres (6 km^{2})	172	3000	200	
Verdura	$20,000	2500 acres (10 km^{2})	1000 acres (4 km^{2})	1500 acres (6 km^{2})	63	2500	160	
Walnut Hill	$12,000	2,120 acres (9 km^{2})	1,700 acres (7 km^{2})	420 acres (1.7 km^{2})	65	2500	80	
Water Oak	$18,400	1,840 acres (7 km^{2})	900 acres (3.6 km^{2})	940 acres (3.8 km^{2})	65	2500	130	
Waverly	$00,000	0000	000	000	000	000	000	
J. E. Whitaker	N/A	2,280 acres (9 km^{2})	1,300 acres (5 km^{2})	1,200 acres (5 km^{2})	94	2000	157	
Robert W. Williams	$8000	N/A	400 acres (1.6 km^{2})	400 acres (1.6 km^{2})	37 acres (150,000 m^{2})	2000	100	
T. B. Winn	$13,920	N/A	800 acres (3.2 km^{2})	364 acres (1.5 km^{2})	52 acres (210,000 m^{2})	3000	81	
Woodlawn	N/A	N/A	N/A	N/A	N/A	N/A	N/A	

Note: Value = Plantation Value. IA = Improved Acres. UA = Unimproved Acres. Enslaved People = Number of persons enslaved. Machinery = Worth of machinery. Livestock = Worth of livestock.

Leon County Smaller Farms 1860
Enslaver	Value	IA	UA	Enslaved People	Machinery	Livestock	Notes
E. P. Johnson	$1410	88 acres (360,000 m^{2})	388 acres (1.6 km^{2})	N/A	$10	$260	
William Johnson	$1410	88 acres (360,000 m^{2})	388 acres (1.6 km^{2})	N/A	$10	$260	
E. S. McCollum	$1000	75 acres (300,000 m^{2})	800 acres (3.2 km^{2})	N/A	$125	$880	
Jackson Moody	$500	25 acres (100,000 m^{2})	165 acres (0.7 km^{2})	N/A	$20	$300	
S. W. Sweatman	$1440	117 acres (0.5 km^{2})	123 acres (0.5 km^{2})	N/A	$100	$550	

== See also ==
- List of plantations in the United States
- Slavery in the United States
