= Fort Braden, Florida =

- Census-designated place
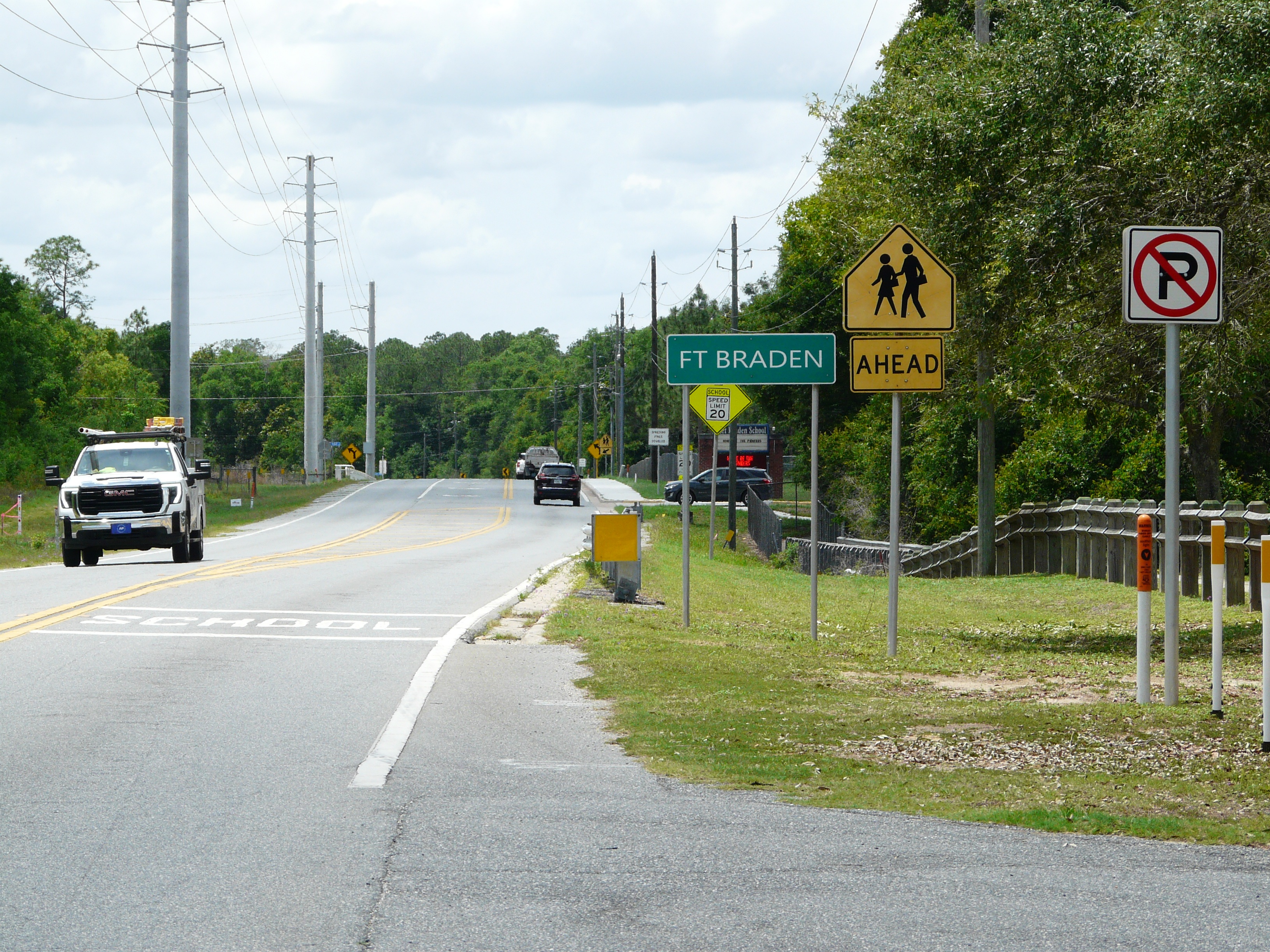
- entering Fort Braden on Florida State Road 20

- Location within Florida Location within the United States
- Coordinates: 30°25′39″N 84°31′59″W
- Country: United States
- State: Florida
- County: Leon

Area
  - Total: 5.17 sq mi (13.39 km^{2})
  - Land: 4.35 sq mi (11.26 km^{2})
  - Water: 0.83 sq mi (2.14 km^{2})
- Elevation: 125 ft (38 m)

Population (2020)
  - Total: 1,045
  - Density: 240.5/sq mi (92.84/km^{2})
- Time zone: UTC-5 (Eastern (EST))
  - Summer (DST): UTC-4 (EDT)
- ZIP Code: 32310 (Tallahassee)
- Area codes: 850/448
- FIPS code: 12-23680
- GNIS feature ID: 2805176

Fort Braden is a historic location and census-designated place (CDP) in western Leon County, Florida, United States. It was first listed as a CDP in the 2020 census with a population of 1,045.

== History ==
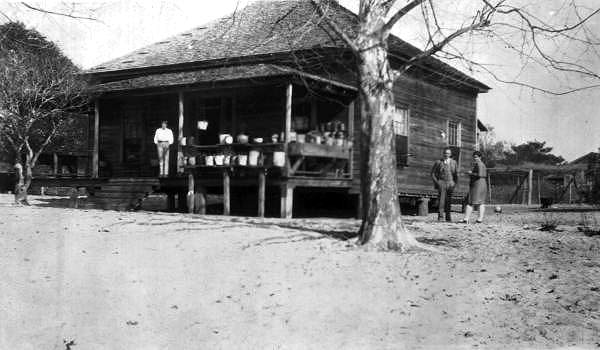
Fort Braden store, date unknown

On December 3, 1839, Fort Braden was established as a military fort during the Second Seminole War, 1st Lieutenant Seth B. Thornton of Company G, 2nd U.S. Dragoons built the fort and was its first Commanding Officer. It was near the Ochlockonee River on the 126 feet contour just south of the then "Pork Creek" (now known as Polk Creek) eighteen miles southwest of Tallahassee. Fort Braden was named for Virginia Braden, formerly Virginia Ward. She married Dr. Joseph Braden, a prominent citizen of Tallahassee. Joseph Braden's brother, Hector, was director of Tallahassee's Union Bank.

Virginia was the daughter of Leon County plantation owner George T. Ward, of Southwood Plantation and Waverly Plantation.

On July 12, 1840, a fight with Indians by two soldiers of Company B of the 2nd Infantry stationed at Fort Braden resulted in their deaths, The two soldiers were traveling from Fort White, Florida back to Fort Braden (mistakenly reported in some newspaper accounts of the incident as “Fort Brady”) and were attacked in Cow Creek Hammock about 4 miles from Fort White. Cow Creek is a creek that runs into the Santa Fe River close by Fort White. The soldiers, Sergeant William Ziegler and Corporal Daniel Sweatman were initially interred in Cow Creek hammock community near Fort White. Their military records indicate they were reinterred in the Saint Augustine National Cemetery in 1907 under the pyramids there that identify soldiers killed during this period.

Fort Braden was abandoned on June 7, 1842, at the conclusion of the Second Seminole War. The historical site is on a 94 acre parcel of privately held land of the Herold family at approximate GPS 30.25.50 -84.32.00. For years the actual site of Fort Braden, or Fort Virginia Braden, has been speculated to be one of several places known as Jackson Bluffs between the original channel of the Oclocknee River (now flooded by Lake Talquin) and Highway 20 in SW Leon County. Several were close, but none documented the actual location, but it was hidden in "plain sight" being documented in a legal historical Platt Book and Survey for a large north Florida land purchase known as the Forbes' Purchase, <1852-1856> that contained printed forms and maps, some of which were completed in manuscript by surveyors Randolph and Hunter; McIver and Galbraith, James D. Galbraith; Hodgson, Randolph and Hunter; M.A. Williams, and McIver and Louis. The documents are available in the FSU Strozier Library Special Collections and Archives Florida (Oversize) F314 .P56 1852a, and showed the Fort location, surrounding fields, and path of the old Fort Braden Road that led right up to the front gates of the Fort.

The survey shows the Fort is located south of “Pork Creek" (now known as Polk Creek), a tributary to the Oclocknee River, built at the 120 feet elevation. It is located on private property, owned currently by the Herold Family Trust, but was also owned in 1999 by the Herold Family that farmed the land, and later planted it as a tree farm, which is the current state of the property. No visible signs remain of the Fort structure that is located at approximately 30 degrees 25 minutes 50 seconds North, 84 degrees 32 minutes West, but an exhibit from a 1999 Masters Thesis written by FSU student Wendy Richard shows the location of the Fort and surrounding fields. Wendy’s Thesis shows the archeological work that was done by her team at the site in 1999. The details of the artifacts discovered at the site are cataloged in detail of the Thesis available at the FSU Strozier Library, General Collections E83.835 .R53 1999 titled "Looking for Fort Braden: A Second Seminole War Fort 1839-1842."

Like other forts around the nation, a small community had grown near the fort. In 1843 an E.M. Garnett attending the Leon County Convention in Tallahassee came from the area. In 1847 collection of taxes took place at the Fort Braden School House. In 1856 and 1872 Fort Braden was one of the voting precincts in Leon County.

Though Fort Braden was south of the cotton rich Red Hills Region, it had successful planters Hugh Black, H.H. Black, P.B. Chanlers, John Gray, Joseph Haines, C. Gray, John Grissette, R.L. Harvey, and J. E. Williams. It was reported that in Florida State Gazetteer of 1886-1887 that Fort Braden had one Methodist church and one Baptist church. Fort Braden was reported to have had a school house, a blacksmith shop, a grist mill, and a cotton gin.

== Demographics ==
Historical population
Census	Pop.	Note	%±
2020	1,045		—
U.S. Decennial Census; 2020

Fort Braden first appeared as a census designated place in the 2020 U.S. census.

=== 2020 census ===
As of the 2020 census, Fort Braden had a population of 1,045. The median age was 50.0 years. 20.6% of residents were under the age of 18 and 20.4% of residents were 65 years of age or older. For every 100 females there were 95.3 males, and for every 100 females age 18 and over there were 90.8 males age 18 and over.

100.0% of Fort Braden's residents lived in rural areas.

There were 433 households in Fort Braden, of which 24.5% had children under the age of 18 living in them. Of all households, 52.4% were married-couple households, 20.6% were households with a male householder and no spouse or partner present, and 22.4% were households with a female householder and no spouse or partner present. About 25.9% of all households were made up of individuals and 11.7% had someone living alone who was 65 years of age or older.

There were 470 housing units, of which 7.9% were vacant. The homeowner vacancy rate was 1.2% and the rental vacancy rate was 4.5%.

Fort Braden CDP, Florida – Demographic Profile (NH = Non-Hispanic)
Race / Ethnicity	Pop 2020	% 2020
White alone (NH)	903	86.41%
Black or African American alone (NH)	23	2.20%
Native American or Alaska Native alone (NH)	7	0.67%
Asian alone (NH)	4	0.38%
Pacific Islander alone (NH)	0	0.00%
Some Other Race alone (NH)	4	0.38%
Mixed Race/Multi-Racial (NH)	54	5.17%
Hispanic or Latino (any race)	50	4.78%
Total	1,045	100.00%

Note: the US Census treats Hispanic/Latino as an ethnic category. This table excludes Latinos from the racial categories and assigns them to a separate category. Hispanics/Latinos can be of any race.

== See also ==
- Old Fort Braden School
