= Fort Ward (Florida) =

Coordinates: 30.1521°N 84.2109°W

This article deals with Fort Ward, Florida, in the United States. For other Fort Wards, see: Fort Ward (disambiguation).

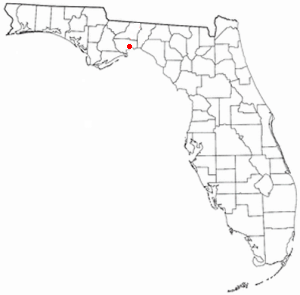
Location of Fort Ward.

Fort Ward was a Confederate States of America fort located in Wakulla County, Florida, at the confluence of the Wakulla River and St. Marks River and named after Colonel George T. Ward, owner of Southwood Plantation, Waverly Plantation, and Clifford Place Plantation south of Tallahassee. During the American Civil War, Confederate troops placed a battery of cannons at Fort Ward.

== History ==
The site on which Fort Ward stands was originally a camp site of Spanish explorer Pánfilo de Narváez, in 1528, when he ventured north from Tampa. Narváez saw that the area was advantageous in a geographic sense. In 1539, Hernando de Soto followed with his men.

By 1679, the Spanish governor of Florida started construction on the first fort (named Fort San Marcos de Apalache) using logs coated with lime to give the look of stone. The fort stood, until 1681, then was burned and looted by pirates. In 1719, Spanish Captain Jose Primo de Ribera arrived to construct a second wooden fort. The fort was called San Marcos de Apalache. The wood for construction was cut at Mission San Luis de Apalachee to the north.

As a stone fort, its construction began in 1739.

The old moat at Fort Ward.

The fort was turned over to the English in 1763, half complete, as a result of the Seven Years' War. Spain regained control and ownership, by 1787, reoccupying it for 13 more years.

In 1800, a former British officer named William Augustus Bowles attempted to unify and lead 400 Creek Indians against the Spanish, eventually capturing San Marcos. A Spanish flotilla arrived some five weeks later and re-assumed control of the fort.

In 1818, General Andrew Jackson invaded Spanish Florida and took Fort San Marcos (see the First Seminole War). Two captured British citizens, Robert Christy Ambrister and Alexander George Arbuthnot, were tried and found guilty of inciting Indian raids and executed, causing a diplomatic nightmare between the United States and England (see the Arbuthnot and Ambrister incident).

In 1821, Florida officially became the property of the United States through the Adams-Onis Treaty and the fort was occupied by U.S. troops. In 1824, the fort was abandoned by the U.S. and turned over to the Territory of Florida. By 1839, the fort was returned to the U.S. and a federal marine hospital was built there 18 years later, using stones from the Spanish fort. The hospital provided care for victims of yellow fever.

In 1861, the final conflict took place at San Marcos when the Confederates took the fort and renamed it Fort Ward. From 1861 to 1865, a Union squadron blockaded the mouth of the St. Marks River. The Battle of Natural Bridge eventually stopped the Union force that intended to take Fort Ward.
