= R. G. Shepard Plantation =

Cotton plantation in Florida, US

Coordinates: 30.3822°N 84.1953°W

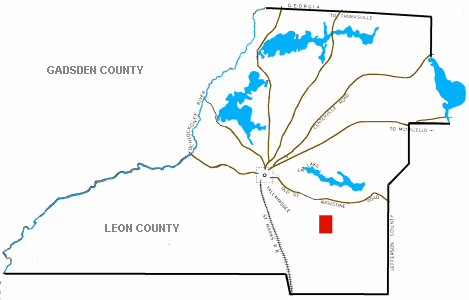
Location of the R. G. Shepard Plantation

The R. G. Shepard Plantation was a small forced-labor farm growing cotton on 1,400 acres (570 ha) located in south central Leon County, Florida, United States established by R. G. Shepard.

== Location ==
The R. G. Shepard Plantation bordered Southwood Plantation on the west side. Also nearby and to the northeast were the Joseph Chaires Plantation, as well as George Taliaferro Ward's Clifford Place Plantation, Waverly Plantation, and Southwood Plantation.

Today, this land encompasses part of Tram Road in the general area of an incorporated community called Corey, southeast of Southwood Golf Club and northeast of Woodville.

== Plantation specifics ==
The Leon County Florida 1860 Agricultural Census shows that the R. G. Shepard Plantation had the following:

- Improved Land: 800 acres (320 ha)
- Unimproved Land: 600 acres (240 ha)
- Cash value of plantation: $24,000
- Cash value of farm implements/machinery: $2000
- Cash value of farm animals: $7000
- Number of persons enslaved: 90
- Bushels of corn: 1000
- Bales of cotton: 225
