= Welaunee Plantation, Florida =

Quail hunting plantation in Florida, United States

Coordinates: 30.533137°N 84.140253°W

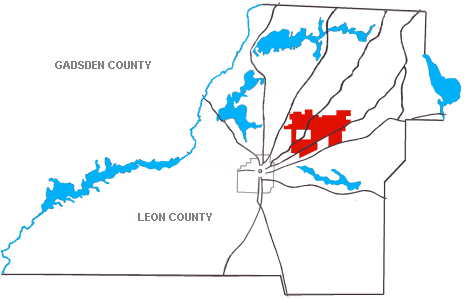
Location of Weelaunee Plantation in 1947.

Welaunee Plantation was a large quail hunting plantation located in central Leon County, Florida, United States established by Udo M. Fleischmann.

== History ==
Welaunee Plantation was created from land that once belonged to several cotton plantations and smaller farms. Known plantation lands that were purchased were R. A. Whitfield's The House Place Plantation, the southern tract of the James Kirksey Plantation, and Joseph John William's La Grange Plantation.

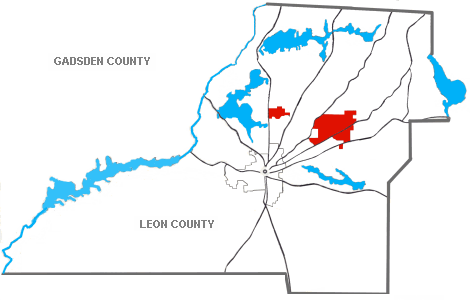
Location of Weelaunee Plantation in 1967.

In 1952, Udo Fleischmann died leaving the property to his wife. Under Mrs. Fleischman, the property was used for Hereford cattle. In 1962, Mrs. Fleischmann died and her nephew, John W. Mettler, Jr. of New Brunswick, New Jersey and son of John Wyckoff Mettler the founder and president of Interwoven Stocking Company. Mettler increased the size of stock cattle to 500 head.

In 1966 purchased 694 acres (2.81 km^{2}) from his aunt, Mrs. Alfred B. Maclay. In 1967 he purchased the last acreage of Sunny Hill Plantation totaling 6,000 acres (24 km^{2}).

== Recent history ==
Welaunee Plantation falls within the Miccosukee Greenway project. This greenway preserves the plantation, a vast pie shaped area between Miccosukee and Centerville Roads, is still not developed. The greenway plan was carefully carried out through years of careful negotiation between the Trust for Public Land, Leon County and the Welaunee's owners preserves the Miccosukee and Centerville canopy roads. By providing a right of way transportation corridor for Welaunee Boulevard, the greenway anticipates the transportation problems associated with connecting thousands of Welaunee Plantation and other northeastern residents to Tallahassee's center.
