= Alfred Barmore Maclay =

American horseman and garden designer

Alfred B. Maclay
- Alfred B. Maclay standing in Killearn Gardens
- Born: Alfred Barmore Maclay; June 3, 1871; Manhattan, New York
- Died: May 27, 1944 (aged 72); Manhattan, New York
- Occupations: Horseman, horse show official, garden designer
- Known for: ASPCA Maclay National Championship; Killearn Gardens
- Spouse: Louise Fleischmann (m. 1919)
- Children: 2
- Father: Robert Maclay

Alfred Barmore Maclay was an American horseman, dog breeder, and gardener. He served as president of the National Horse Show and of the American Horse Shows Association, now the United States Equestrian Federation. In 1933 he created the ASPCA Maclay National Championship for junior riders. In 1923 he bought a quail-hunting plantation north of Tallahassee, named it Killearn, and spent the next two decades designing the ornamental gardens that his widow later gave to the state as Alfred B. Maclay Gardens State Park.

== Early life ==
Maclay was born in Manhattan on June 3, 1871, to Robert Maclay and his wife Georgiana. Georgiana's father was one of the owners of the Knickerbocker Ice Company; Robert Maclay succeeded him as the company's president and was also president of the Knickerbocker Trust Company. Alfred Maclay served in the United States Army, reaching the rank of second lieutenant. After his time in the Army, he spent several years learning the family businesses before turning to horses.

== Killearn ==
In 1919 Maclay married Louise Fleischmann at her mother's home in New York. The couple settled at an estate they called Killearn Farms in Millbrook, New York, and had two children, Alfred Jr. and Georgiana. Louise had visited Leon County while growing up, and her brother Udo Fleischmann owned Welaunee Plantation there.

In 1923 Maclay bought John Law's Lac-Cal quail plantation on the western shore of Lake Hall and used the property, which he named Killearn Plantation, mainly as a winter retreat. He enlarged the original 1,935 acres (783 ha) to about 4,000 acres (1,600 ha) by 1930 and hired Fred J. Ferrell as garden supervisor in 1924. Maclay himself designed and built the ornamental gardens, combining native and exotic plants and adding features over the following two decades. The finished layout included a walled garden with gated entrances, fountains, a reflecting pool framing the view of Lake Hall, themed plantings of azaleas and camellias, and wide brick walkways. Many African Americans living on the plantation worked for Maclay, and over time their employment shifted from mainly agricultural work to wage labor.

== Death and legacy ==
Maclay died in Manhattan on May 27, 1944, after a long illness. Louise Maclay took over management of the gardens and tried to run them as a self-sustaining tourist attraction before donating 307 acres (124 ha) centered on the gardens to the state. The transfer became official on April 6, 1953, and the land was given to be managed as an ornamental garden and to stand as a memorial to her husband. Killearn Gardens was renamed Alfred B. Maclay State Gardens in 1965.
