= Benjamin Chaires =

Wealthy Florida planter and slave owner

- Born: 1786; Onslow County, North Carolina, U.S.
- Died: October 4, 1838 (aged 51–52); Chaires, Leon County, Florida, U.S.
- Resting place: Verdura Plantation
- Occupations: planter, land owner, banker, investor
- Spouse: Sarah Jane Powell

Benjamin Chaires Sr. (1786–1838) was an American planter, land owner, banker, and investor in Territorial Florida, who may have been the richest man in Florida in the 1830s. He was involved in the creation of the first railroads in Florida.

== Early career ==
Benjamin Chaires was born in Onslow County, North Carolina in 1786. He lived in Georgia before moving to Florida. He had married, and become a surveyor and a plantation owner by the time he was 30.

Chaires started buying land in Florida while it was still controlled by Spain. He bought a one-third interest in a plantation on Amelia Island in 1818. He also bought land near Jacksonville and St. Augustine.

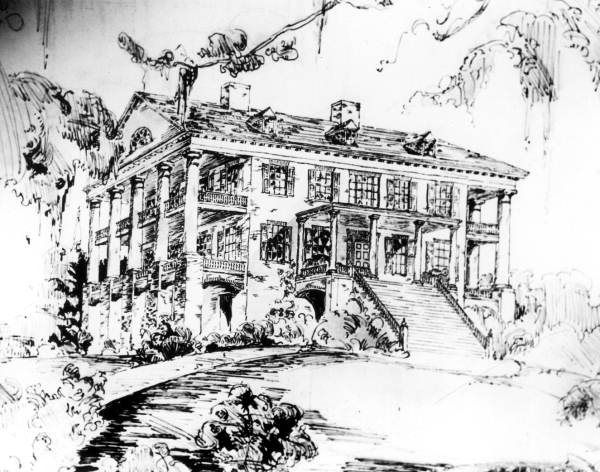
Drawing of Chaires' Verdura Plantation house in Leon County, Florida by an unknown artist

While living in northeastern Florida, Chaires was involved in a lawsuit with Zephaniah Kingsley involving timber Chaires had harvested from Kingsley's Greenfield Plantation. In May 1820, Chaires and Thomas Fitch purchased 59 slaves from George Atkinson of Camden County, Georgia, with Chaires receiving 32 of the slaves as his share.

The city of Jacksonville was founded in 1822, after Florida became a territory of the United States. The survey of the first section of Jacksonville was conducted in June 1822 under the supervision of Chaires and two other commissioners. Duval County was created out of St. Johns County on August 12, 1822, and Jacksonville was soon designated the county seat of Duval County. John Brady transferred a lot in trust to Chaires and Francis Ross as the site for a courthouse. After framing for the courthouse was erected on the lot, Chaires and Ross transferred the lot and partially constructed courthouse to the county. Chaires was friends with William Pope Duval, governor of the Florida Territory, who appointed Chaires County Judge for Duval County for a term in 1823–1824. Chaires was also a justice of the peace in Duval county.

In 1824, Chaires was the successful bidder to provide rations to the Seminoles as provided for in the Treaty of Moultrie Creek. He was among several prominent men in Florida who felt that the allocations by the government for the rations were not sufficient to support the Seminoles, in part because the lands included in the reservation were among the agriculturally poorest in the territory. Chaires recommended expanding the reservation to include better land. He held the contract for only a year, but the profits that he made from that contract partially funded his purchases of land.

Chaires acquired land across northern Florida. He eventually bought 30,000 acres (12,000 ha) in St. Johns, Duval and Alachua counties. In 1829, a major part of a 20,000 acre Spanish land grant in what is now Columbia County, now known as the "Little Arredondo Grant", was transferred to Chaires. Along with his extensive lands near Tallahassee, he had large interests in the areas around St. Marks and St. Joseph. Sharyn Shields states that Chaires had purchased up to 45,000 acres in Florida.

== Leon County ==
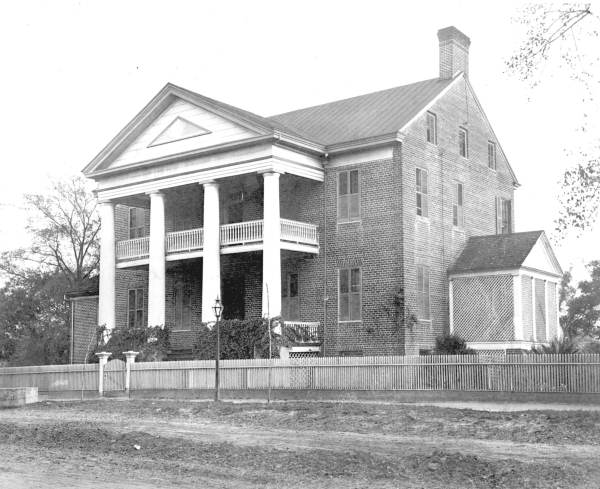
The Columns, built by Chaires in 1830, as it appeared about 1890

Chaires moved to Tallahassee in the late 1820s. He became one of the wealthiest land owners in Leon County. His brothers Green H. Chaires and Thomas Peter Chaires also established plantations in Leon County, Evergreen Hills Plantation and Woodlawn Plantation, respectively. In 1830, Chaires bought land on the north side of Tallahassee and built the house called The Columns. Chaires sold The Columns in 1832 and built the Verdura plantation house, which was reputed to be the finest in Florida, on 500 acres (200 ha) ten miles east of Tallahassee that became the core of the Verdura Plantation.

Chaires and his brothers all had slaves on their plantations produce bricks by hand. Chaires used such bricks for the Columns and the mansion and outbuildings at Verdura, and he and his brothers supplied bricks for the Apalachicola Arsenal in Chattahoochee, Florida, the second state capital building in Tallahassee, and other buildings in Tallahassee.

Chaires owned other land in Leon County, as well as the Bolton Plantation in Jefferson County. In 1836 Chaires bought a plantation of 800 acres and 57 slaves with a price of $25,000 listed on the deed, but Chaires took out a $50,000 mortgage to pay for it. The discrepancy may represent an undervaluation of the sale for tax purposes.

== Banks and railroads ==
Although Chaires' primary interest was in growing cotton, he was also involved in banking and railroads. The Central Bank of Florida opened in Tallahassee in 1832, with Chaires as president. The Central Bank absorbed the Bank of Florida, which had been started by William "Money" Williams in 1829, by buying its stock. Chaires was involved in the creation of the Union Bank of Tallahassee. The Bank of Florida and the Central Bank were "merchants' banks", controlled by and serving primarily merchants, while the Union Bank was a "planters's bank", with only plantation owners allowed to buy stock in the bank. Chaires was a founder of the Merchants and Planters Bank of Magnolia.

Chaires and his brother Green were among the organizers of the Tallahassee Railroad in 1834, with Benjamin Chaires serving as a director of the company. He also was involved in the creation of the Lake Wimico and St. Joseph Canal and Railroad Company. When that railroad decided to lay a new line in early 1837 from St. Joseph to Iola on the Apalachicola River, Chaires received the construction contract. The Panic of 1837 dried up credit and cash, and the railroad tried to pay its debts in company scrip. Chaires refused to accept the scrip, and took various financial assets of the company as payment, while continuing construction at a slow pace. He was president of the company when he died in 1838.

Chaires and R. H. Berry financed the construction of the General Samuel Parkhill, a ship designed to carry cotton directly from the Apalachee Bay ports of Magnolia, Port Leon and St. Marks to Liverpool, bypassing agents in the northern U.S.

== Wealth and influence ==
By reputation, Chaires was the richest man in Florida. The 1830 US Census reported that he owned 213 slaves. His slaves were young, presumably because he had recently purchased them or brought them from elsewhere, selecting for youth. Only one male slave was over 55 years of age. Half of the males and almost all of the females were under 37 years old, and 64 children were ten or younger. He has been variously described as the "first millionaire in the territory" and "one of the ... wealthiest and most successful planters" in Territorial Florida.

In Tallahassee, Chaires became part of "The Nucleus", a political faction consisting mostly of friends and associates of Andrew Jackson. Other members of the group included Governor Call, James Gadsden, Achille Murat, and John Bellamy, who had constructed, and given his name to, the Bellamy Road. He was selected to be a delegate to the constitutional convention to be held in St. Joseph in 1838–1839 to draft a constitution for Florida's statehood, but he died before leaving for it.

== Death and legacy ==
Chaires died in 1838, aged 52. He left to his wife Sarah the Verdura mansion and 500 acres around it, the furniture in the mansion, a carriage and its driver, and one-tenth of his personal estate. Chaires had ten children, five of whom were minors. Each child received a one-tenth share of the estate, except for his daughter Mary Ann. Instead, Chaires left Mary Ann $10,000, to be transferred to her only after the death of her husband, William Burgess, specifically stating that "William Burgess shall not have any part of the same or enjoy any benefit whatsoever." Chaires appointed his brother Green and his son Joseph as executors. Joseph Chaires was operating his father's plantation in 1839. Tax records that year showed Chaire's estate to consist of 9,440 acres (3,820 ha), 80 slaves, and "pleasure carriages" worth $800. In 1842, his estate foreclosed on property, including land and slaves, valued at $35,570 (~$1.11 million in 2024). In 1845, the County Court authorized the division of the estate among the heirs, including about 10,000 acres, slaves, provisions, livestock, and equipment.

In 1860, Joseph Chaires owned a plantation of 3,800 acres (1,500 ha) in southeastern Leon County.

Chaires left Bolton Plantation to his daughter Martha. Chaires' daughter Sarah Jane had married George Taliafero Ward. The land she inherited was incorporated into his Southwood Plantation.

Chaires' son Benjamin C. Chaires began buying small amounts of land. He was less of a speculator than other planters in the area. While some planters were heavily in debt at their deaths, Chaires' heirs continued to maintain large holdings, and were not involved in lawsuits with banks over debts.

Henry, Chaires' slave carriage driver, left to Chaires' widow Sarah in his will, is buried in the family cemetery near the ruins of the mansion.
