= Alfred B. Maclay Gardens State Park =

State park in Florida, United States

Alfred B Maclay Gardens State Park
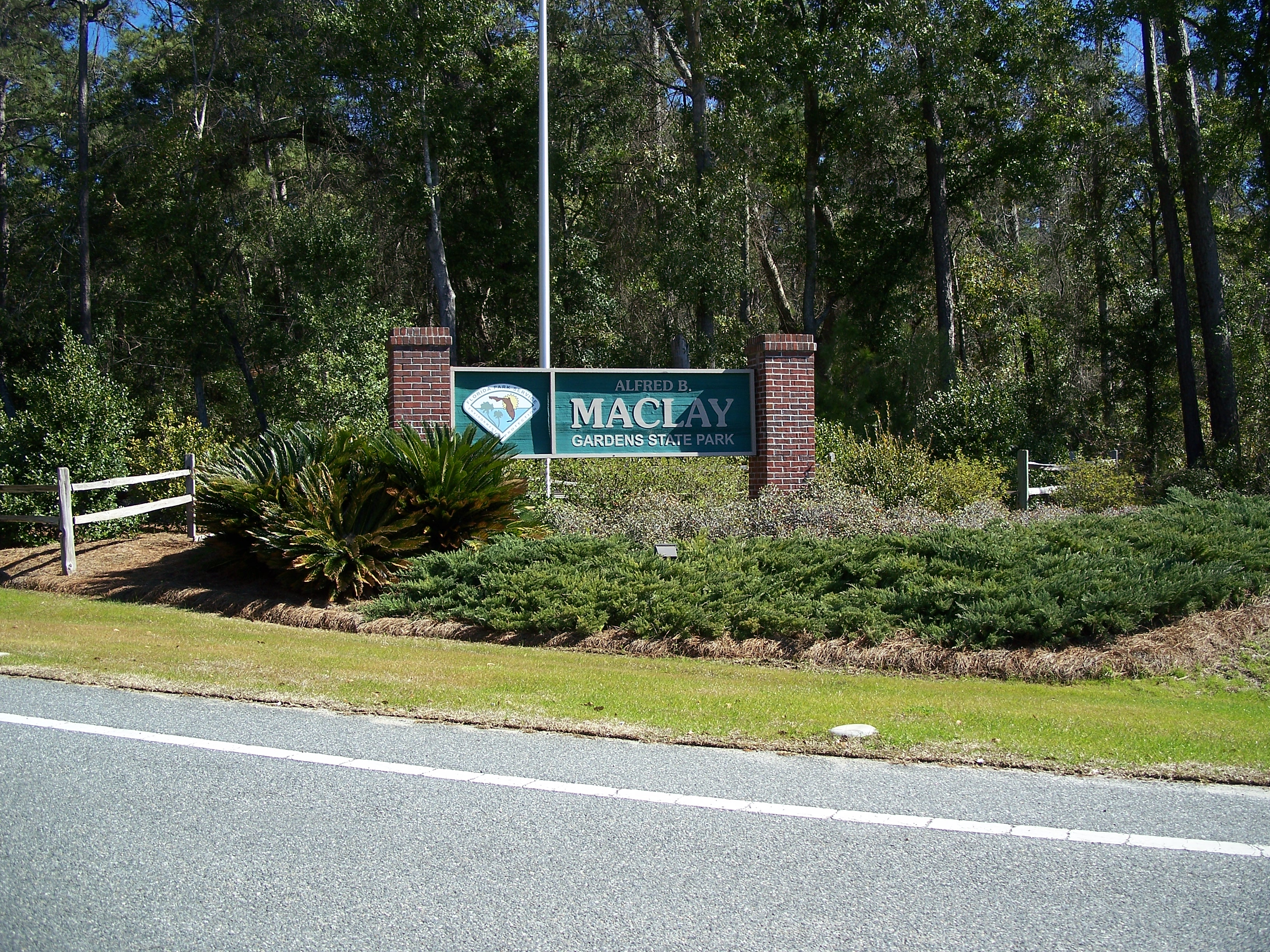

- Location within Florida Location within the United States
- Interactive map of Alfred B Maclay Gardens State Park
- Location: Leon County, Florida, United States
- Nearest city: Tallahassee, Florida
- Coordinates: 30°31′08″N 84°15′04″W
- Area: 473.56 ha (1,170.19 acres)
- Established: 1953; 73 years ago
- Governing body: Florida Department of Environmental Protection
- Website: Official website

The Alfred B. Maclay State Gardens is a 1,170.19-acre (4.7356 km^{2}) Florida State Park, botanical garden and historic site in Tallahassee, Florida. The gardens are also a U.S. historic district known as the Killearn Plantation Archeological and Historic District. It received that designation on August 16, 2002. According to the National Register of Historic Places, it contains 18 historic buildings, 4 structures and 4 objects. . The address is 3540 Thomasville Road.

== History ==
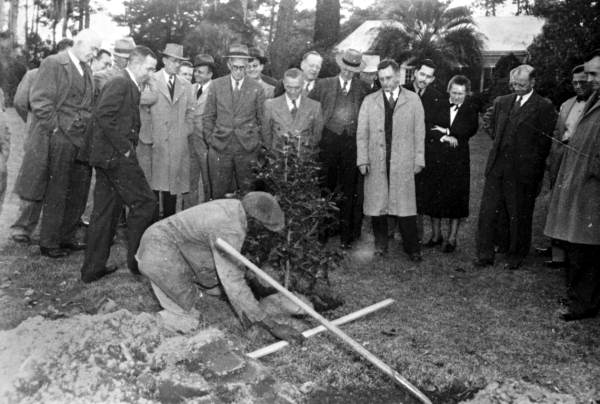
Depew Smith burying a prize racehorse at Killearn Gardens while the home and garden were still in the possession of the Maclay family.

The property associated with Maclay was part of the Lafayette Land Grant. In antebellum times, it was part of the Andalusia Plantation, growing cotton. Starting in 1882 a vineyard on the property produced wine, until Leon County voted to go dry in 1904. After that it was a quail-hunting estate called Lac-Cal.

In 1923, New York financier Alfred Barmore Maclay (1871–1944), the son of Robert Maclay, and his wife, Louise Fleischman, purchased the 1,935 acres (783 ha) Lac-Cal quail-hunting plantation and adjoining land, creating a 3,760 acres (1,520 ha)-estate he called Killearn, after his ancestral village and birthplace of his great-grandfather in Scotland. Maclay developed the gardens until his death. His wife continued their development, opened them to the public in 1946, and in 1953 donated some 307 acres (1.24 km^{2}) of their estate, including the gardens, to a predecessor of the Florida Department of Environmental Protection. In 1965 the gardens were renamed in Maclay's honor, to avoid confusion with the new adjacent development called Killearn Estates.

== Biology ==
The backbone of the garden plantings are azaleas and camellias. Trees include bald cypress, black gum, cyrilla, dogwood, hickory, holly, Japanese maple, oak, plum, redbud, Liquidambar, and Torreya taxifolia. Other plantings include Ardisia, Aucuba, Zamia integrifolia, Rhododendron chapmanii, Gardenia, ginger, jasmine, Oriental magnolia, mountain laurel (Kalmia latifolia), Nandina, palmetto, sago palm, Selaginella, Wisteria, and Yucca filamentosa.

At the front of the gardens is a Native Plant Arboretum that's maintained by the Magnolia Chapter of the Florida Native Plant Society, which includes Piedmont azaleas, Florida flame azaleas, Eastern red columbine, white wild indigo, English dogwood, and Florida anise.

== Lakes ==
- Lake Hall
- Lake Overstreet
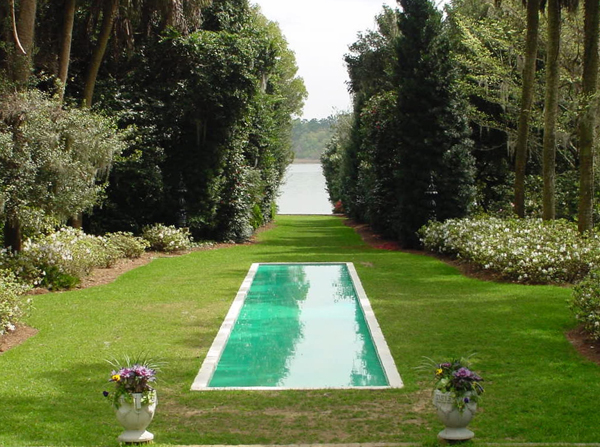
  Reflection pool built in 1935
- Lake Elizabeth or Gum Pond

== Maclay House ==
The 1909 Maclay House has been furnished to appear as during the residence of the Maclays. The house is open for tours during high blooming season from January through April.

== Experiences and amenities ==
The park has such amenities as bicycling, birding, boating, canoeing, fishing, hiking, horse trails, kayaking, picnicking areas, extensive walking trails, and swimming. It also has a museum with interpretive exhibits.
