= Live Oak Plantation =

Live Oak Plantation may refer to:

- Live Oak Plantation, Florida, Leon County
- Live Oak Racing or Live Oak Plantation, racing name for Charlotte C. Weber, owner of Live Oak Stud in Ocala, Florida, breeder of horses such as World Approval
