= Lake Overstreet =

Lake in the state of Florida, United States

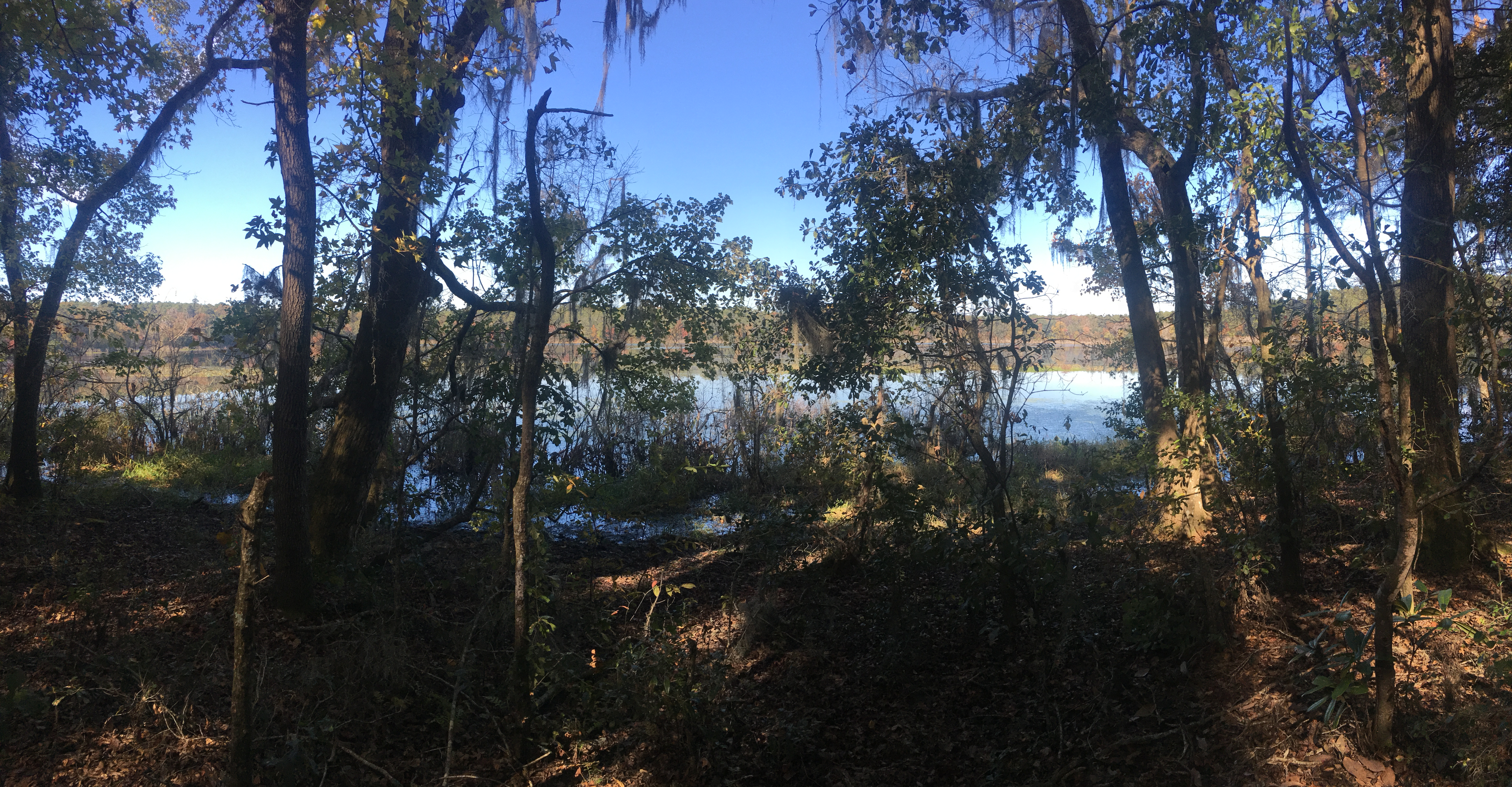

- Location within Florida Location within the United States
- Location: Alfred B. Maclay Gardens State Park, Leon County, Florida
- Coordinates: 30°31′53″N 84°15′24″W
- Basin countries: United States
- Surface area: 144 acres (58 ha)

Lake Overstreet is a lake in Leon County, Florida, United States. It is 144 acres (0.58 km^{2}) in size and falls within the property of Alfred B. Maclay Gardens State Park and is just northwest of Lake Hall by 500 feet (150 m). Access to the lake is only by hiking and mountain bike trails.

The lake and land surrounding it were part of the Lafayette Land Grant. During antebellum years, this lake was within Andalusia Plantation owned by Frenchman Emile Dubois. Later, it was the western border of Live Oak Plantation.

Fish found in Lake Overstreet include largemouth bass, bluegills and bream.

== Sources ==
- Taltrust
- Paisley, Clifton; From Cotton To Quail, University of Florida Press, c1968.
