= The Columns (Tallahassee, Florida) =

Historic house in Florida, United States

- U.S. National Register of Historic Places
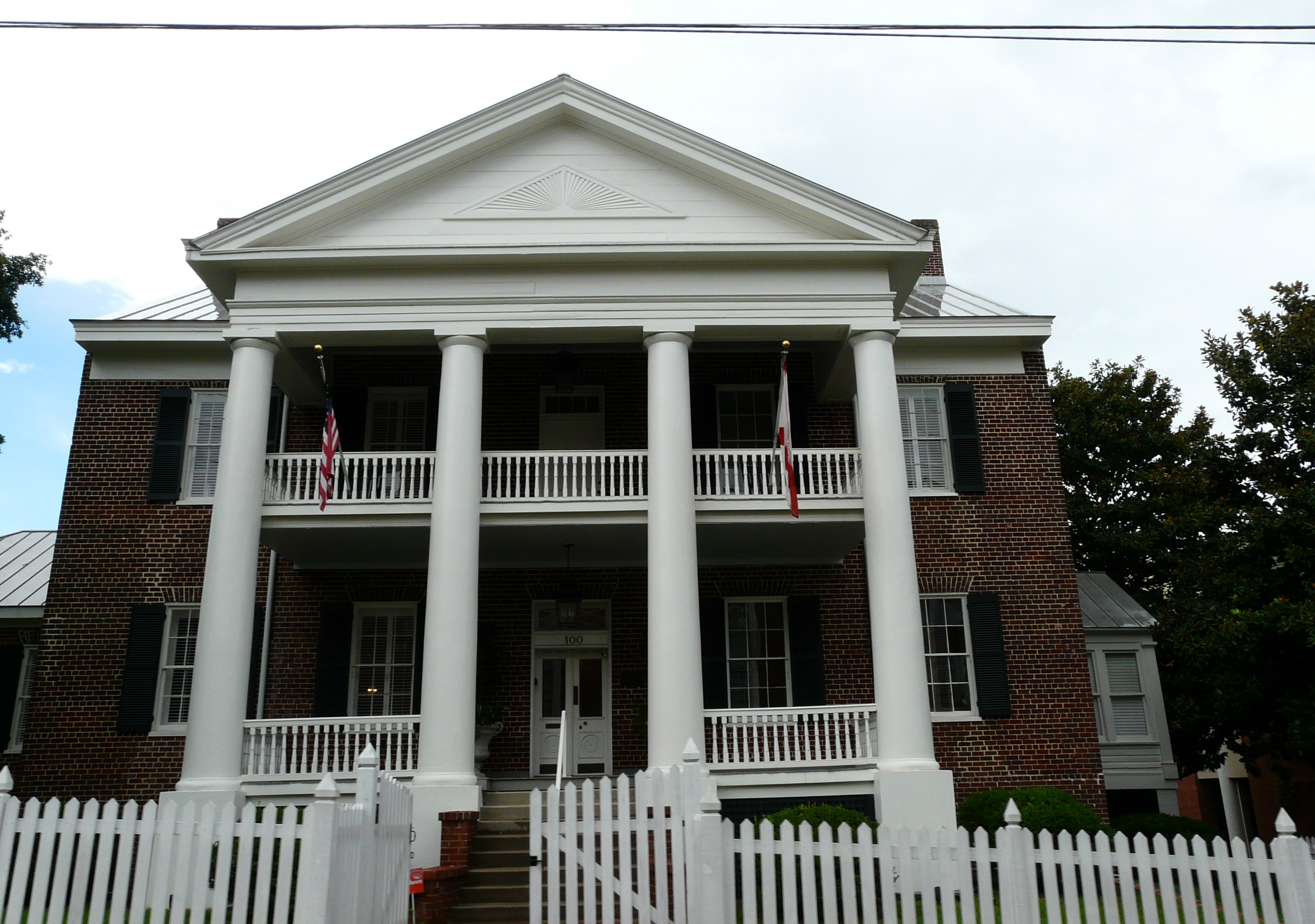

- Location within Florida Location within the United States
- Location: Tallahassee, Florida
- Coordinates: 30°26′32″N 84°17′0″W
- NRHP reference No.: 75000561
- Added to NRHP: May 21, 1975

The Columns (also known as The William "Money" Williams Mansion) is a historic home in Tallahassee, Florida. It was built around 1830. It is located at 100 North Duval Street. On May 21, 1975, it was added to the U.S. National Register of Historic Places.

The building is the present home of the James Madison Institute. It is a former home of Benjamin Chaires.
