= Verdura Plantation =

Cotton slave plantation in Florida, United States

Coordinates: 30.3811°N 84.1659°W

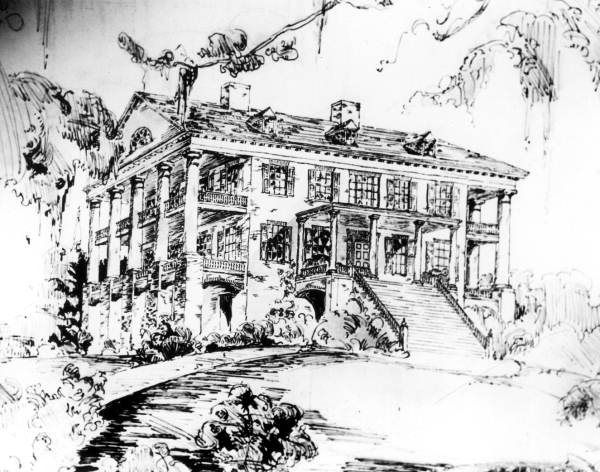
Drawing of Verdura Plantation house, Leon County, Florida

Verdura Plantation was a large slave plantation growing cotton on 9,440 acres (3,820 ha) in eastern Leon County, Florida, United States established by Benjamin Chaires.

== History ==
Benjamin Chaires Sr. was an early arrival in Leon County and one of its wealthiest land owners. His brothers Green H. and Thomas P. established Evergreen Hills Plantation and Woodlawn Plantation, respectively, in Leon County.

Benjamin bought 500 acres (200 ha) 10 miles east of Tallahassee in 1832 and built a brick plantation house in Greek Revival style there. It had three floors and 15 rooms, each with a fireplace. Partitions downstairs could be removed to create an 80-foot long ballroom. Verandas supported by Tuscan columns flanked it on it sides, rather than across the front. Its bricks were made handmade by forced labor on the plantation. The house stood on a hill partially surrounded by a stream. On a clear day the Gulf of Mexico was visible from the attic. It burned in 1885.

This was the nucleus of Chaires' holdings and he added to the plantation throughout the 1830s, including in 1836 when he added a forced-labor farm of 800 acres and 57 enslaved people to his holdings. He died in 1838 and tax records in 1839 show his estate to consist of 9,440 acres (3,820 ha) and 80 enslaved humans. His son Joseph Chaires managed the plantation that year. The estate continued to grow after his death and in 1842, before it had been divided among his heirs, it foreclosed on land and yet more enslaved people valued at $35,570.

Chaires bequeathed the house, 500 acres surrounding it, and 10% of his personal property to his wife. Chaires had ten children, five of whom were minors, and in 1845 the county court authorized the division of the estate among them, including about 10,000 acres (4,000 ha), enslaved people, provisions, livestock, and equipment.

Each child's share of the Verdura plantation was still among the largest plantations in Leon County. While some planters were heavily in debt at their deaths, Chaires was not. His heirs continued to maintain large holdings and were not involved in lawsuits with banks over debts. The 1860 US Census recorded that 63 forced laborers at Verdura had produced 160 bales of cotton and 25,000 US bushels (880,000 L; 200,000 US dry gal; 190,000 imp gal) of corn. The loss of forced labor after the Civil War and a depression in the cotton market began its ruin. It was abandoned after the main house burned in 1885. It was sold by the Chaires family in 1948.

== See also ==
- Plantations of Leon County, Florida
- National Register of Historic Places listings in Leon County, Florida
