= William Bailey Plantation =

Cotton plantation in Florida, United States

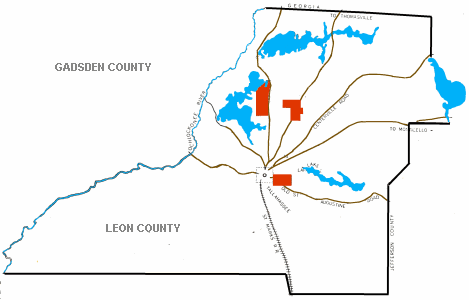
Location of William Bailey Plantation.

The William Bailey Plantation was a large forced-labor farm growing cotton on 2510 acres (10 km^{2}) located in central Leon County, Florida, United States established by William Bailey.

== Location ==
The William Bailey Plantation had 3 tracts of land. The first tract bordered the William A. Carr Plantation on the north and east. It bordered the second tract of Burgesstown Plantation on the west. Today, this land would edge the west side of N. Meridian Road near Gardner Road on the north and south including eastern parts of Miller Landing Road, the black neighborhoods on Louis John Lane, China Doll Drive, Paremore Road, Sandy Springs Lane and Thompson Circle to and including eastern Elinor Klapp-Phipps Park.

The second tract to the east bordered Oaklawn Plantation on the north side and the William A. Carr Plantation on the west. Today this land encompasses parts of Killearn Estates and other developments on the east side of Thomasville Road and the eastern Ox Bottom Road on the west side of Thomasville Road.

The third tract was the farthest south and east of the capitol. Today this land encompasses Hillaman Golf Course, Governor's Square Mall, western Apalachee Parkway, and western Old St. Augustine Road.

== Plantation specifics ==
The Leon County Florida 1860 Agricultural Census shows that the William Bailey Plantation had the following:

- Improved Land: 825 acres (3 km^{2})
- Unimproved Land: 564 acres (2 km^{2})
- Cash value of plantation: $42,670
- Cash value of farm implements/machinery: $945
- Cash value of farm animals: $4817
- Number of slaves: 80
- Bushels of corn: 4,000
- Bales of cotton: 352

== William Bailey ==
William Bailey was a Georgian that came to Jefferson County in the 1820s. His acquisition of Leon County land began in 1850 with the tracts displayed. By 1860, Bailey still owned plantation property in Jefferson Co. on the Aucilla River.

The Union Bank building in Tallahassee was purchased in 1847 by William Bailey and Isaac Mitchell after it closed in 1843 due to the Panic of 1837, Second Seminole War, and unsound banking practices. William Bailey also served on the Tallahassee Railroad Board of Directors 1861–1865. William Bailey was also a general during the Civil War. He died in 1867.
