= House Place Plantation =

Plantation in Florida, United States

Coordinates: 30.5322°N 84.1423°W

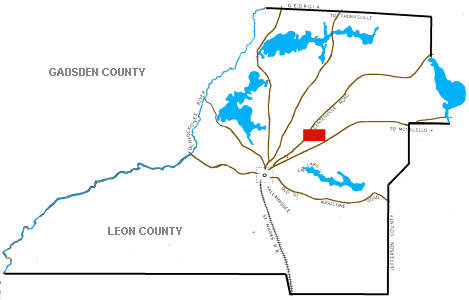
Location of The House Place Plantation

The House Place Plantation was a small forced-labor farm of 1,800 acres (730 ha) located in central Leon County, Florida, United States established by R.A. Whitfield.

== Location ==
The House Place bordered the James Kirksey Plantation on the west and the large La Grange Plantation on the south and east. Today the land northeast of Fleischmann Road and between Miccosukee Road and Centervillle Road. In the twentieth century, House Place and other cotton plantations became Welaunee Plantation, used for quail hunting.

== Plantation Specifics ==
The Leon County Florida 1860 Agricultural Census shows that Pine Hill Plantation had the following:

- Improved Land: 900 acres (360 ha)
- Unimproved Land: 900 acres (360 ha)
- Cash value of plantation: $16,600
- Cash value of farm implements/machinery: $500
- Cash value of farm animals: $2170
- Number of persons enslaved: 47
- Bushles of corn: 3000
- Bales of cotton: 216

The House Place would be purchased by Udo Fleishmann later on and become Welaunee Plantation.
