= Casa de Laga Plantation =

Plantation in Florida, United States

Coordinates: 30.5144°N 84.3325°W

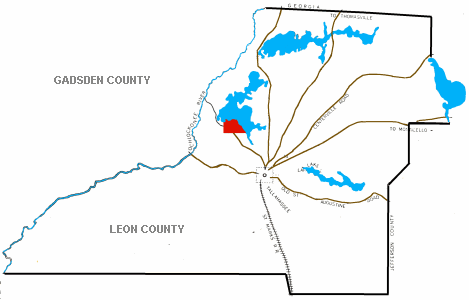
Location of Casa de Laga Plantation

Casa de Laga Plantation was a forced-labor farm of 1,228 acres (497 ha) located in west central Leon County, Florida, United States established by George Alexander Croom. It was also known as the Ball and McCabe Place and later as Shidzuoka. In 1860, 70 enslaved people worked the land, which was primarily devoted to producing cotton as a cash crop.

== Location ==
Casa de Laga was located along the southwest shores of Lake Jackson. Today the plantation's grounds are the neighborhoods surrounding Harriet Drive, Longview Drive, Faulk Drive, Shady Oaks Drive, and slightly across N. Monroe Street or U.S. Highway 27.

== 1860 plantation specifics ==
The Leon County Florida 1860 Agricultural Census shows that the Casa de Laga Plantation had the following:

- Improved Land: 800 acres (320 ha)
- Unimproved Land: 428 acres (173 ha)
- Cash value of plantation: $15,000
- Cash value of farm implements/machinery: $500
- Cash value of farm animals: $5850
- Number of slaves: 70
- Bushels of corn: 3,000
- Bales of cotton: 200

Croom had 96 head of cattle, 100 sheep and 100 swine. He also produced 200 pounds of wool and slaughtered livestock valued at $3000.

== Owners ==
George Alexander Croom, was born October 7, 1821. He married Julia M. Church, who was the daughter of Alonzo Church, the sixth president of the University of Georgia in Athens on February 13, 1843. George Alexander Croom was the father of Alonzo Church Croom, Comptroller of the State of Florida from 1900 until his death on December 7, 1912 and the brother of Hardy Bryan Croom, a planter and recognized naturalist, who discovered the rare Florida torreya tree and established Goodwood Plantation. He died July 5, 1890.

In 1883 Casa de Laga was sold to H. D. McColloch of Wisconsin. McColloch then sold the plantation 6 months later to Professor E. Warren Clark of Narragansett Pier, Rhode Island and Austn M. Purvis of Philadelphia. Clark would eventually turn the plantation into a game preserve. In 1891, a Charles T. Wilson of Cincinnati opened the Lake Jackson Hunting Lodge on the property.

== See also ==
- Plantations of Leon County, Florida
