= Live Oak Plantation, Florida =

Cotton plantation in Florida, United States

Coordinates: 30.491654°N 84.264407°W

Live Oak Plantation was originally a small cotton plantation of 1,560 acres (630 ha), operated by captive, enslaved workers and located in central Leon County, Florida, United States. It was established by John Branch who arrived in Florida in 1832 and served as Florida Territorial Governor while living at Live Oak for 15 years.

== Location ==
Live Oak was located in north central Leon County extending from the east shore of Lake Jackson to the western edge of Lafayette Township.

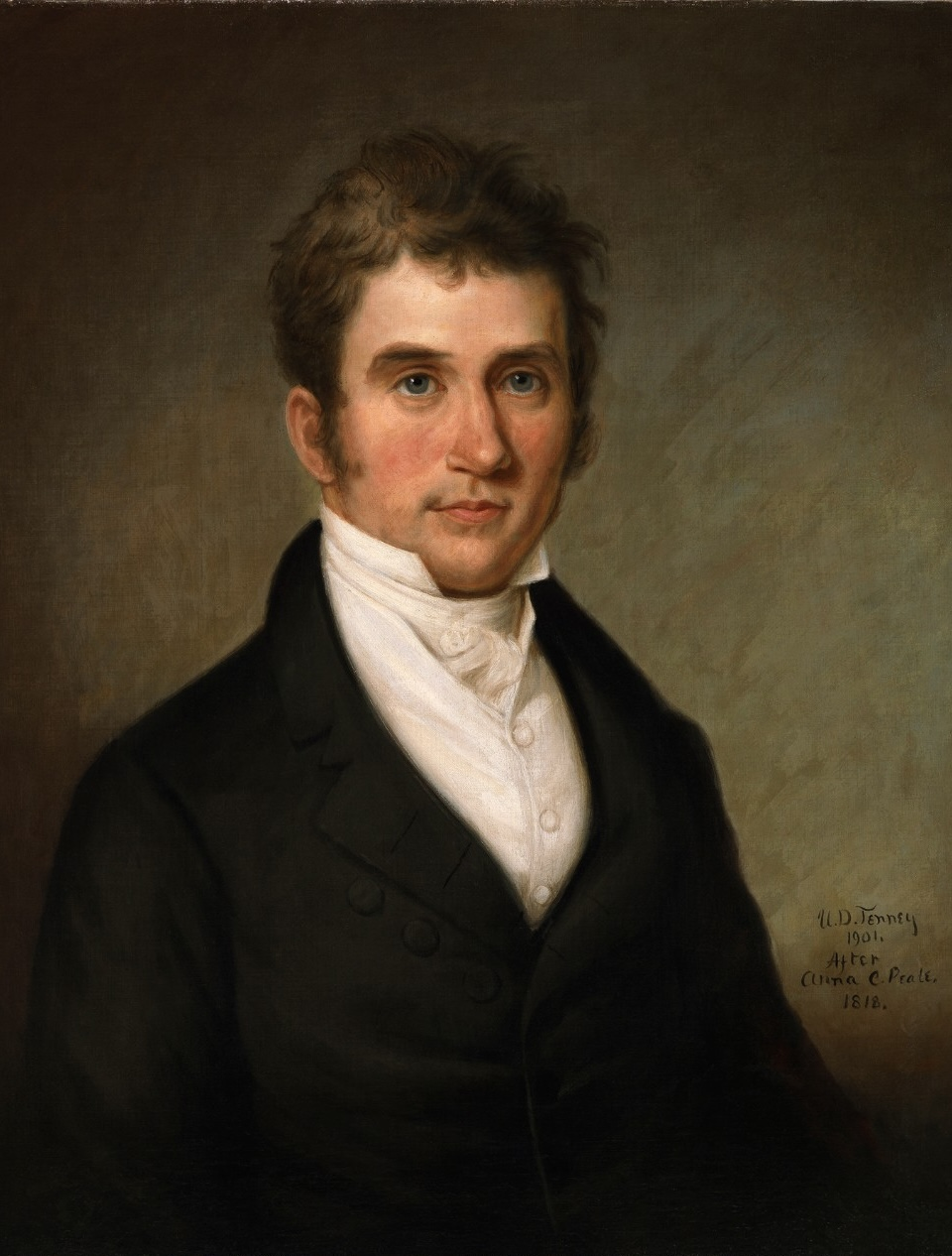
Gov. John Branch

== 1860s ==
The Leon County Florida 1860 Agricultural Census shows that Live Oak Plantation had the following:

- Improved land: 820 acres (330 ha)
- Unimproved land: 260 acres (110 ha)
- Cash value of plantation: $4000
- Cash value of farm implements/machinery: $300
- Cash value of farm animals: $2390
- Number of slaves: 68
- Bushels of corn: 2000
- Bales of cotton: 73

== 1870s-1900s ==
On June 9, 1870, John Branch's heirs sold Live Oak, now at only 1,250 acres (5.1 km^{2}), to Howard S. Case of Columbia, Pennsylvania. This was historically noted as the last large purchase of Leon County plantation property to a northerner.

In 1887 the Case family sold the plantation to Edmund Hugh Ronalds of Edinburgh, Scotland, a chemist and the eldest son of Dr Edmund Ronalds. Ronalds wintered at Live Oak and married Lisa Williams, daughter of Joseph John Williams of La Grange Plantation on November 21, 1891. In 1892 Lisa Williams Ronalds contracted and died from tuberculosis while in Scotland. Edmund Hugh died on March 17, 1895.

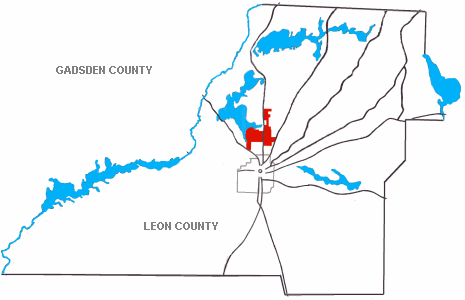
Location and increased size of Live Oak Plantation

Live Oak Plantation was now larger and its borders extended eastward to Lake Hall, Lake Overstreet, and Lake Elizabeth.

Dr. Tennent Ronalds, a fellow of the Edinburgh Obstetrical Society, inherited Live Oak upon his brother's death. A keen sportsman, he spent his time enjoying hunting, fishing, and golf.

By 1903 Live Oak boasted a private golf course with a flock of sheep for maintenance of greens and fairways. Live Oak was also extended to 3,226 acres (1,306 ha) and had the first tung tree orchard in Florida. In 1903 an additional 2,246 acres (909 ha) were leased from Ellen Call Long's Orchard Pond Plantation for use in hunting. In 1915 and 1916 Tennent Ronalds purchased Orchard Pond from the Long and Call families. Ronalds also purchased the James Kirksey Plantation. Tennent Ronalds committed suicide on February 24, 1924.

In 1925, Live Oak was only 2,915 acres (1,180 ha). That year, it was purchased by Herman C. Fleitman of Stamford, Connecticut. In 1934, it was sold again to Leon T. Cheek of Jacksonville, Florida. Cheeks was a member of a well-to-do family from Nashville, Tennessee owning Cheek and Neal Coffee which became Maxwell House.

In 1948, Live Oak was sold to A. M. Middlebrooks. The plantation is no longer, having become the neighborhoods in and around Live Oak Plantation Road and including Middlebrooks Circle.
