= Old Fort Braden School =

- U.S. National Register of Historic Places
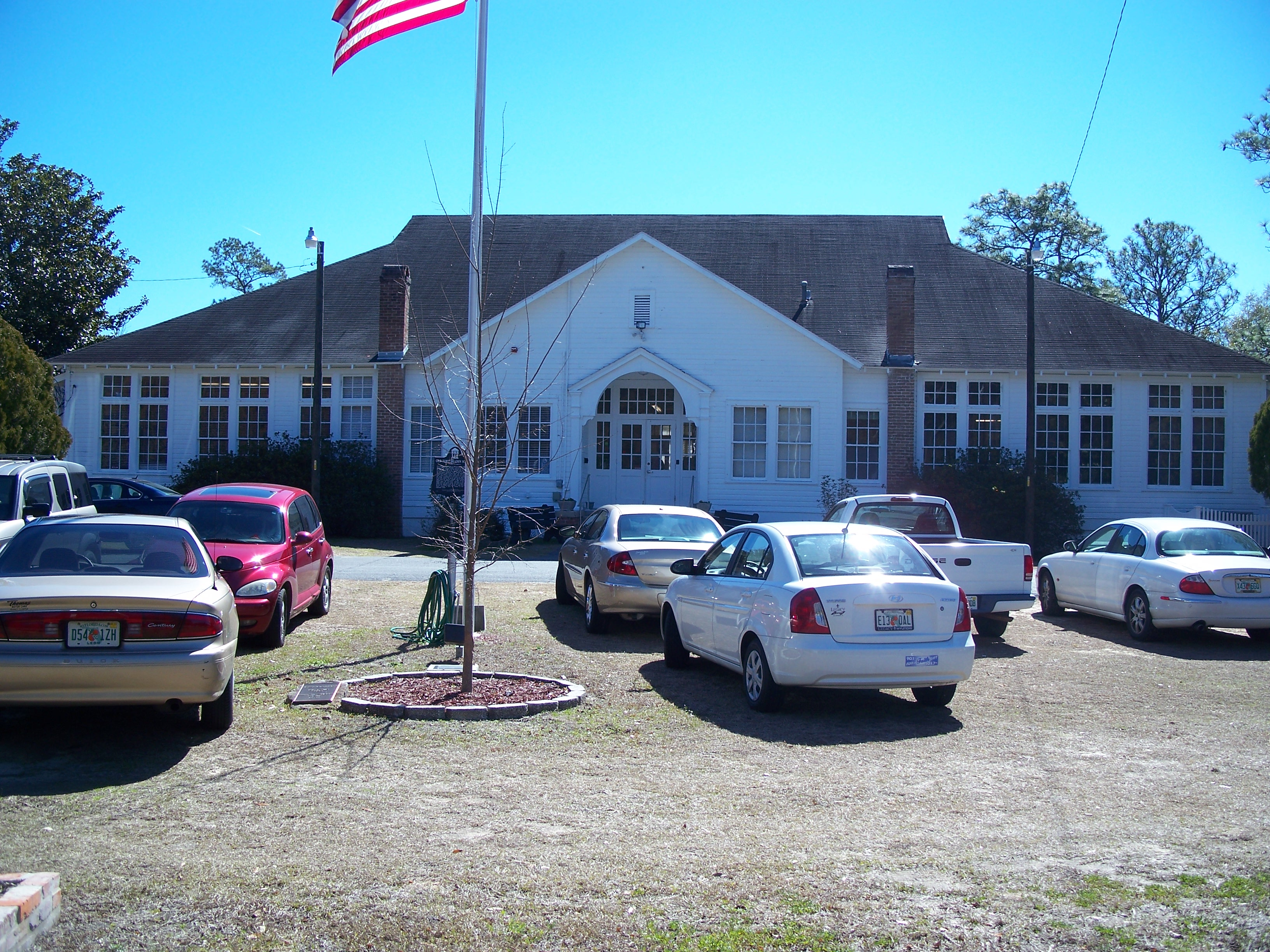

- Location within Florida Location within the United States
- Location: Fort Braden, Florida
- Coordinates: 30°25′34″N 84°32′05″W
- NRHP reference No.: 94000347
- Added to NRHP: April 14, 1994

The Old Fort Braden School (also known as the Fort Braden Elementary School) is a historic school in Fort Braden, Florida. It is located on State Road 20, 18 miles west of Tallahassee. On April 14, 1994, it was added to the U.S. National Register of Historic Places.

== See also ==
- Education in Florida
- Fort White Public School Historic District
