= Fort Ward =

Fort Ward may refer to several former military installations in the United States including:

- Fort Ward (Florida)
- Fort Ward (Virginia)
- Fort Ward (Washington)

Fort Ward may also refer to:

- Fort Ward, Bainbridge Island, Washington, a town
- Fort Ward Park, a former state park in Bainbridge Island, Washington, that came under municipal control in 2011
