= Bradfordville, Florida =

Unincorporated community in Florida, U.S.

- Census-designated place
- Central palm tree in the Bannerman Crossings Shopping Center

- Location within Florida Location within the United States
- Coordinates: 30°33′41″N 84°13′04″W
- Country: United States
- State: Florida
- County: Leon
- Elevation: 144 ft (44 m)

Population (2020)
  - Total: 19,183
- Time zone: UTC-5 (Eastern (EST))
  - Summer (DST): UTC-4 (EDT)
- ZIP Code: 32309; 32312
- Area codes: 850/448
- GNIS feature ID: 2805168

Bradfordville is an unincorporated community and census-designated place (CDP) in northern Leon County, Florida, United States. The population was 19,183 at the 2020 census. It is part of the Tallahassee, Florida Metropolitan Statistical Area. It is both 8 miles (13 km) north of Tallahassee and south of the Florida/Georgia state line at the intersection of US 319 and County Road 0342 (Bannerman Road/Bradfordville Road).

== Geography ==
Bradfordville has rolling hills and ravines spotted with lakes and ponds. Lake Iamonia, one of Florida's larger natural lakes, is northwest of Bradfordville. Bradfordville is within the noted Red Hills Region.

== Demographics ==
Bradfordville first appeared as a census designated place in the 2020 U.S. census.

=== Racial and ethnic composition ===
Bradfordville CDP, Florida – Racial and ethnic composition Note: the US Census treats Hispanic/Latino as an ethnic category. This table excludes Latinos from the racial categories and assigns them to a separate category. Hispanics/Latinos may be of any race.
Race / Ethnicity (NH = Non-Hispanic)	Pop 2020	2020
White alone (NH)	15,203	79.25%
Black or African American alone (NH)	1,300	6.78%
Native American or Alaska Native alone (NH)	26	0.14%
Asian alone (NH)	708	3.69%
Native Hawaiian or Pacific Islander alone (NH)	6	0.03%
Other race alone (NH)	41	0.21%
Mixed race or Multiracial (NH)	757	3.95%
Hispanic or Latino (any race)	1,142	5.95%
Total	19,183	100.00%

=== 2020 census ===
As of the 2020 census, Bradfordville had a population of 19,183. The median age was 42.3 years. 25.0% of residents were under the age of 18 and 17.7% of residents were 65 years of age or older. For every 100 females there were 93.7 males, and for every 100 females age 18 and over there were 90.9 males age 18 and over.

90.7% of residents lived in urban areas, while 9.3% lived in rural areas.

There were 6,998 households and 5,833 families in Bradfordville. Of all households, 38.1% had children under the age of 18 living in them. 68.8% were married-couple households, 9.5% were households with a male householder and no spouse or partner present, and 18.3% were households with a female householder and no spouse or partner present. About 16.6% of all households were made up of individuals and 9.1% had someone living alone who was 65 years of age or older.

There were 7,214 housing units, of which 3.0% were vacant. The homeowner vacancy rate was 1.3% and the rental vacancy rate was 4.2%.

== History ==
Bradfordville began as a settlement between 1829 and 1832 when the Bradford brothers moved to the area from around Enfield, Halifax County, North Carolina to farm large tracts of land.

The Bradfords were direct descendants of William Bradford, governor of the Plymouth Colony (Massachusetts). William's great-great-grandson, John Bradford, received a land grant located in Halifax County, North Carolina from King George III of Great Britain. The mother of the Bradford sons, Sarah Cromwell Bradford, was a direct descendant of Oliver Cromwell.

=== Bradfords and plantations ===
- Thomas Anderson Bradford, born February 13, 1790, founded Walnut Hill Plantation
- Dr. William H. Bradford established Edgewood Plantation and became the doctor for Pine Hill Plantation's slaves
- Henry B. Bradford born October 30, 1791, lived a little further south on what is now Thomasville Road in the same area as brother Thomas.
- Dr. Edward Bradford, born August 2, 1798, founded Pine Hill Plantation. The most successful brother, he later founded Horseshoe Plantation east-southeast of Lake Iamonia. The plantation is still in existence today as a privately run hunting preserve.
- Richard Henry Bradford born November 15, 1800, founded Water Oak Plantation near Lake McBride

Another planter, Captain William Lester, from Georgia, moved to Leon County and established a very successful and large plantation called Oaklawn Plantation.

The Bradfordville School was constructed between the years 1884–1892 on a small piece of land owned by the Lester family. The school, a wood-framed vernacular structure, represents a typical one-room schoolhouse mentioned in rural American history. It qualifies for the National Register and has been preserved and now resides on the southwest section of Bannerman Road. In 1886, a T. Hardenburgh established a broom factory in Bradfordville. Hardenburgh planted 5 acres (20,000 m^{2}) of broom corn while Col. John R. Bradford planted 8 acres (32,000 m^{2}) and another farmer planted 1-acre (4,000 m^{2}). The 14 acres (57,000 m^{2}) combined supplied the factory with enough material to keep it in operation for a year.

In the early 1900s, Bradfordville had two general stores, a justice of the peace (Judge Whitehead), and a Saturday meat market ran by Tommy Carr. Greene Johnson ran a trading post that supplied staple goods like sugar and flour. Today that building, after restoration, is an animal hospital.

Bradfordville is now an area with a few large homes and is at the east-southeast tip of the large housing development of Killearn Lakes Plantation. It is mostly a major commercial area that contains Lawton Chiles High School, 4 branch banks, 3 major retail stores plus a variety of other smaller retail stores.

The proposed Red Hills Coastal Parkway, a tolled eastern bypass of Tallahassee, would have its northern terminus in Bradfordville.

== Natural history ==
Bradfordville is located in a forested area of longleaf pine, shortleaf pine, loblolly pine, laurel oak, southern live oak, chalk maple, southern magnolia, and sweetgum. Wildlife in the area includes the endangered red-cockaded woodpecker, wood stork, osprey, northern bobwhite, and gopher tortoises.

== Political ==
Bradfordville Governmental Representation
Position	Name	Party
County Commission At-Large (1)	Carolyn Cummings	Democrat
County Commission At-Large (2)	Nick Maddox	Democrat
Commissioner Dist. 4	Brian Welch	Democrat
U.S. House	Neal Dunn	Republican
Florida House	Allison Tant	Democrat
Florida Senate	Corey Simon	Republican

== Schools ==
- Lawton Chiles High School
- Deerlake Middle School
- Killearn Lakes Elementary

== Fire suppression ==
The Bradfordville Volunteer Fire & Rescue is made up of seven individuals dedicated to helping protect their community with support from the Tallahassee Fire Department. They operate from substation 28 and their equipment includes two tankers, two rapid response SUVs and two heavy-duty brush trucks.
