= George Washington Scott =

American businessman

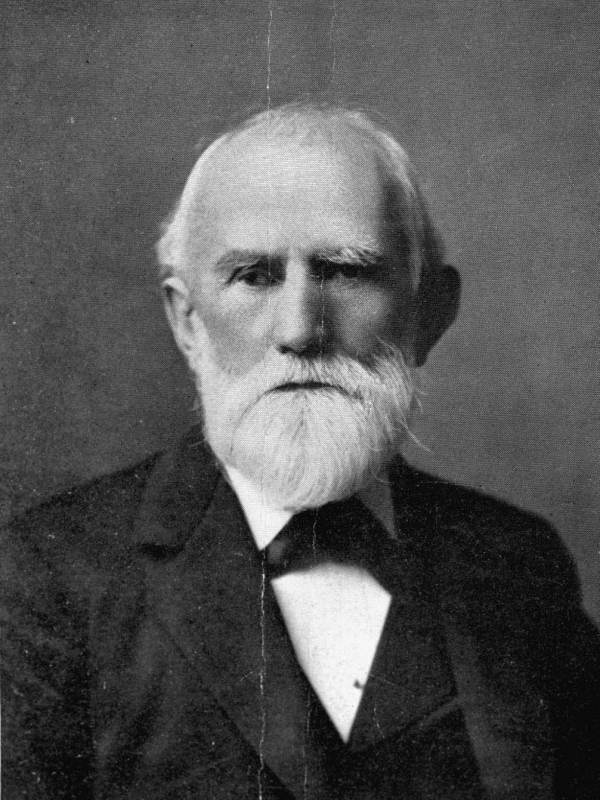
- State Archives of Florida
- Born: February 22, 1829; Alexandria, Pennsylvania, US
- Died: October 3, 1903 (aged 74)
- Occupations: Businessperson, Planter, Education philanthropist
- Political party: Democratic
- Spouse: Rebekah Bucher
- Military career
- Allegiance: Confederate States of America
- Branch: Confederate States Army
- Service years: 1861–1865
- Rank: Lt. Colonel (CSA)
- Unit: 5th Florida Cavalry Battalion
- Conflicts: American Civil War

George Washington Scott (February 22, 1829 – October 3, 1903) was a Florida and Georgia businessperson, education philanthropist, former planter, and former military officer in the Confederate States Army during the American Civil War.

== Biography ==
Scott was born in Alexandria, Pennsylvania, and was the fourth child of Agnes Irvine and John Scott Sr., both of Irish descent. He became a merchant and farmer in Pennsylvania. In 1850 Scott visited Florida and moved to Quincy, Florida, in 1851. In 1852, Scott moved to Leon County, Florida, where he established a mercantile exchange and his George W. Scott Plantation.

In 1860 Scott enlisted in the Tallahassee Guards, a Leon County militia organization. Upon the formation of the Confederacy he was appointed Captain of Company D, Second Florida Cavalry. Scott organized and was elected lieutenant-colonel of the Fifth Florida Cavalry Battalion in 1863, serving throughout middle and east Florida. Scott's unit, called "Scott's Cavalry," participated in the February, 1864 Battle of Olustee and in subsequent actions near Jacksonville. In March 1865 Scott and his men played a prominent role in the Battle of Natural Bridge, south of Tallahassee, which prevented a Union occupation of the State Capital. Scott's unit surrendered and was paroled at Tallahassee in May 1865.

In 1868 Scott ran for Florida governor as a Democratic-Conservative and received overwhelming support. However, due to Northern occupation of Florida, Scott was ruled out for the position. He had not wanted to be a candidate and was relieved at the solution.

While on his plantation, Scott experimented in a variety of crops and planted 12 acres (49,000 m^{2}) of sugar cane, cabbage, collards, rutabagas, Dutch turnips. Scott also created a 16-foot (5 m) overshot waterwheel transferring water from a pond going to corn, sugar and cotton processing.

Scott came up with a revolutionary fertilizer which combined cottonseed with bone meal. Bone was obtained by black farm hands who earned a gallon of cane syrup for every 100-pound sack of animal bones. The bones were crushed with a heavy cast-iron stamp powered by a waterwheel and the meal mixed with sulfuric acid. This was then mixed with cottonseed cake to make a final product.

In 1870 Scott sold his plantation and moved to Savannah, Georgia, then Atlanta, where he built his business. By 1887, the Gossypium Phospo, made by the George W. Scott Company, had become one of the most noted fertilizers in the south.

Scott became the first person to exploit Florida's vast phosphate deposits and in 1887 purchased 1,000 acres (4 km^{2}) of land along the Peace River in Charlotte County, backed the Arcadia Phosphate Company, and sold the Comer-Hall Fertilizer Company in Savannah. In May 1888 the first shipments of phosphate were made to his G. W. Scott Manufacturing Company. Scott built a fortune in real estate and fertilizer in Atlanta.

In 1890 Scott gave $112,250 to Decatur Female Seminary, which he helped organize. The institute took the name of his mother, Agnes Scott, to become Agnes Scott College.

Scott is the namesake to the city of Scottdale, Georgia.

== Notes ==
Party political offices
Preceded by David S. Walker	Democratic nominee for Governor of Florida; 1868	Succeeded by William D. Bloxham
