= Edgewood Plantation (Leon County, Florida) =

Edgewood Plantation was a small forced-labor farm of 1840 acres (7½ km^{2}) located in northern Leon County, Florida, USA owned by Dr. William Bradford.

== Location ==
Edgewood Plantation was located in the general area of Bradfordville near Thomas Anderson Bradford's Walnut Hill Plantation, and Edward Bradford's Pine Hill Plantation, and Richard H. Bradford's Water Oak Plantation.

== Plantation specifics ==
The Leon County Florida 1860 Agricultural Census shows that Edgewood Plantation had the following:

- Improved Land: unknown
- Unimproved Land: unknown
- Cash value of plantation: unknown
- Cash value of farm implements/machinery: $75
- Cash value of farm animals: $870
- Number of slaves: N/A
- Bushels of corn: N/A
- Bales of cotton: N/A

== The owner ==
William Bradford was born in 1829 in Enfield, North Carolina and became the doctor for the slaves at Pine Hill Plantation.
