= Walnut Hill Plantation =

Coordinates: 30.5833°N 84.2229°W

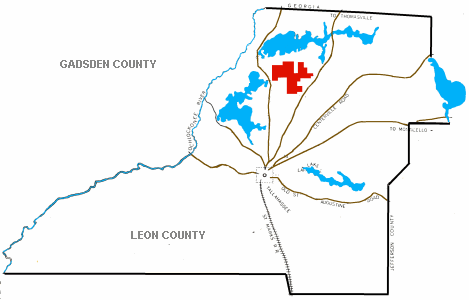
Location of Walnut Hill Plantation and Wateroak Plantation

Walnut Hill Plantation was a small forced-labor farm growing cotton on 2,120 acres (860 ha) in northern Leon County, Florida, United States, owned by Thomas Anderson Bradford.

== Location ==
Walnut Hill was located in the general area of Bradfordville near William Bradford's Edgewood Plantation, Edward Bradford's Pine Hill Plantation, and Richard H. Bradford's Water Oak Plantation.

== Plantation specifics ==
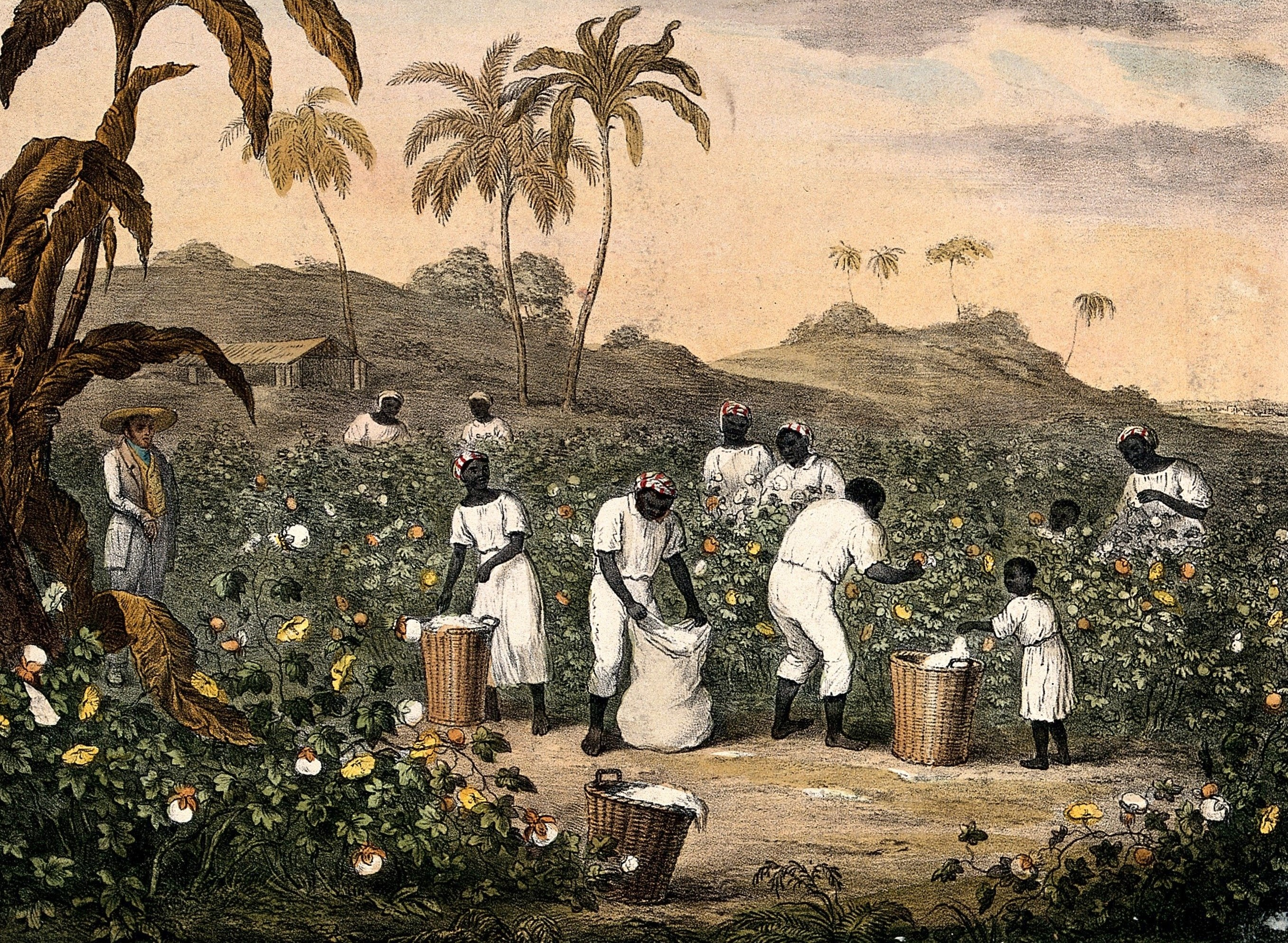
Slaves picking cotton in the United States, 1840

The Leon County, Florida 1860 Agricultural Census shows that Pine Hill Plantation had the following:

- Improved Land: 1,700 acres (690 ha)
- Unimproved Land: 420 acres (170 ha)
- Cash value of plantation: $12,000
- Cash value of farm implements/machinery: $600
- Cash value of farm animals: $3700
- Number of slaves: 65
- Bushels of corn: 2500
- Bales of cotton: 80

== Owner ==
Charles Floyd, father of John Floyd.

Thomas Anderson Bradford was born February 13, 1790, in Enfield, North Carolina. Thomas had a daughter, Sallie G. Bradford, born in 1835 and died in 1867.
