= Pine Hill Plantation =

Cotton plantation in Florida, United States

Coordinates: 30.5951°N 84.1981°W

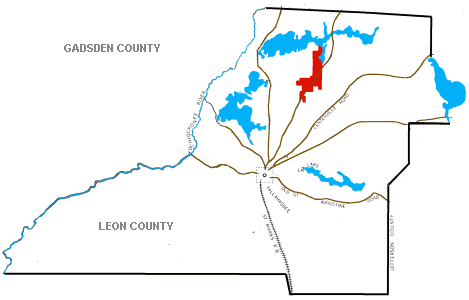
Location of Pine Hill Plantation

Pine Hill Plantation was a large forced-labor farm growing cotton on 3,270 acres (1,320 ha) established between 1829 and 1832 in northern Leon County, Florida, by Edward Bradford. It touched the southeast arm of Lake Iamonia. The area today is known as Bradfordville.

== Location ==
Adjacent plantations:

- Oaklawn Plantation in the northeast and southwest
- Horseshoe Plantation to the north.

Pine Hill's plantation house was located north of Oaklawn Plantation home on Thomasville Road, north of Tallahassee. Today the developments of Killearn Lakes Plantation, large private homes, and several commercial interests are on Pine Hill.

== Plantation specifics ==
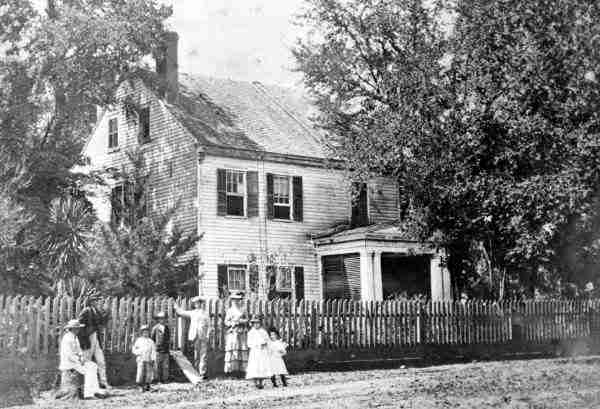
Pine Hill Plantation House 1880

The Leon County Florida 1860 Agricultural Census shows that Pine Hill Plantation had the following:

- Improved Land: 1,500 acres (610 ha)
- Unimproved Land: 1,770 acres (720 ha)
- Cash value of plantation: $28,000 (equivalent to $1,003,333 in 2025)
- Cash value of farm implements/machinery: $1500 (equivalent to $53,750 in 2025)
- Cash value of farm animals: $5,000 (equivalent to $179,167 in 2025)
- Number of slaves: 130
- Bushels of corn: 4000
- Bales of cotton: 225

During March 1857 the "black measles" hit Pine Hill killing several people.

Pine Hill was situated amid rolling hills and green forests, with little streams that fed one of the nearby lakes. The plantation had a large stately mansion painted green and white and which stood in a grove of pines. The mansion was surrounded by gardens of roses and a variety of shrubbery as well as lawns. Thoroughbred Kentucky horses, cows from Alderney and Guernsey grazed on some land. To the east of the mansion were the slaves' cabins. The plantation also had a 24-foot, one room business office with several windows and a fireplace used by Dr. Bradford. This office also served as a hospital for the sick and wounded Confederate soldiers.

=== Life of the enslaved workers ===
Past the main house were approximately 100 well-whitewashed frame cabins with brick chimneys; all who wanted them had gardens, with free seed provided. There were also about 30 house slaves.

Past the cabins one found a saw mill, a grist mill, and a shingle mill. There were shops for a blacksmith, a wheelwright, a carpenter, and a cooper, a brickyard and a kiln. Working there were four white men: an engineer, a miller, a sawyer, and a bookkeeper. A "minister of the Gospel" visited alternate Sundays.

The enslaved people were required to bathe and don clean clothes at least twice a week. There was a contract with a doctor to treat cases of illness.

== The owner ==
Dr. Edward Bradford was born August 2, 1798, and was a descendant of Oliver Cromwell. Edward Bradford took turns with his brothers, Richard, Thomas, and William in hosting an annual holiday celebration, for the slaves, including those from Water Oak Plantation, Walnut Hill Plantation, and Edgewood Plantation, every 4 July. This included a massive barbecue and, when held at Water Oak, fishing parties on Lake Iamonia. No whites were allowed to partake of or interfere with these festivities. Records from 1840 to 1866 show transactions with commission merchants and New York cotton brokers evidence that a prosperous business was transacted at Pine Hill.

Dr. Edward Bradford was a signee to the Southern Rights Association of Centreville District on secession from the Union for "the protection of Southern interests and the vindication of Southern rights to preserve and protect the Constitution in its purity as the basis of Federal compact, and the only foundation on which the Union of the States was made, or on which that Union should be preserved."

Dr. Edward Bradford would go on to establish Horseshoe Plantation east of Lake Iamonia. Edward Bradford died in 1871. This area of plantations would later be known as Bradfordville.
