= Francis Eppes Plantation =

Coordinates: 30.4537°N 84.1989°W

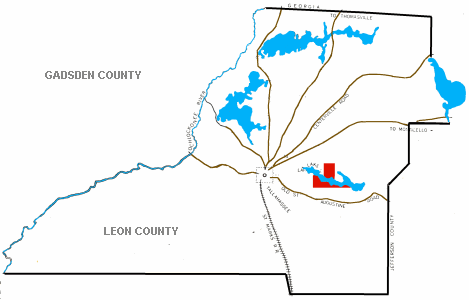
Location of the Francis Eppes Plantation.

The Francis Eppes Plantation was a cotton plantation of 1,920 acres (8 km^{2}) situated in east-central Leon County, Florida, United States and established by Francis W. Eppes in 1829.

== Location ==
The Francis Eppes Plantation bordered Evergreen Hills Plantation on the east, La Grange Plantation on the north, and the northeast tip of Southwood Plantation on the south. The plantation was located on both north and south shores of Lake Lafayette, Florida. Today that land encompasses the neighborhoods around Buck Lake including western Buck Lake Road, southern Pedrick Road, Planters Ridge Drive, Heritage Park Blvd and Doyle Conner Blvd.

== Plantation specifics ==
The Leon County Florida 1860 Agricultural Census shows that the Francis Eppes Plantation had the following:

- Improved Land: 950 acres (4 km^{2})
- Unimproved Land: 970 acres (4 km^{2})
- Cash value of plantation: $24,000
- Cash value of farm implements/machinery: $500
- Cash value of farm animals: $3000
- Number of persons enslaved: 70

== Owner ==
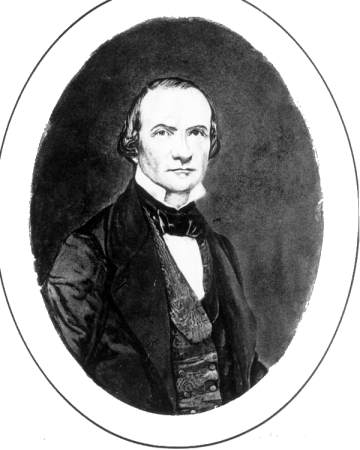
Francis W. Eppes.

Francis W. Eppes, VII, was a grandson of Martha Wayles Skelton Jefferson and Thomas Jefferson. Eppes came to Leon County in 1829 with his wife Mary and numerous slaves from Virginia, including some descendants of Betsy Hemmings, his nurse and a matriarch of the slave community at his childhood home of Millbrook. While the territory was under Spanish rule, Eppes served as Intendant (mayor) of Tallahassee. He is noted for initiating the proposal to locate a state-supported seminary in Tallahassee, which eventually developed into Florida State University.

Eppes sold his plantation during the Civil War for Confederate money. He lost the remainder of his investment and slaves by 1865, when they were freed. Eppes left Tallahassee for Orange County, Florida to begin citrus farming.

Florida became part of the United States in 1821. As Francis Eppes arrived in Florida in 1829, at the time he was Intendant/mayor of Tallahassee, Florida was no longer ruled by Spain.
