= Lake Elizabeth (Florida) =

- Location within Florida Location within the United States
- Location: Winter Haven, Florida
- Coordinates: 28.0056°N 81.7006°W
- Type: natural freshwater lake
- Basin countries: United States
- Max. length: 200 feet (61 m)
- Max. width: 170 feet (52 m)
- Surface area: 0.91 acres (0 ha)
- Surface elevation: 125 feet (38 m)

Lake Elizabeth is a tiny natural freshwater lake in Winter Haven, Florida. This lake is round and has a 0.91-acre (3,700 m^{2}) surface area. This lake is bordered on all but the south side by residences along Lake Elizabeth Drive. A normally dry drainage basin, which is much larger than Lake Elizabeth, is on the south side. This lake has many large trees in the properties around it and much of it is always shaded.

The public has access to this lake along the rim of the drainage basin, on the south side. There is no public swimming area and no public boat ramp. However, since there is shore access on public land, this lake can be fished. The Hook and Bullet website says Lake Elizabeth contains largemouth bass, bluegill and crappie.
