= George W. Scott Plantation =

Coordinates: 30.4116°N 84.2815°W

The George W. Scott Plantation was a 1036-acre (4 km^{2}) cotton-growing forced-labor farm in central Leon County, Florida, United States established by George Washington Scott in 1852 and located 2 miles (3 km) south of Tallahassee.

== Plantation specifics ==
The Leon County Florida 1860 Agricultural Census shows that George W. Scott Plantation had the following:

- Improved Land: 60 acres (¼ km^{2})
- Unimproved Land: 50 acres (¼ km^{2})
- Cash value of plantation: $4000
- Cash value of farm implements/machinery: $1500
- Cash value of farm animals: $5000
- Number of slaves: N/A
- Bushels of corn: N/A
- Bales of cotton: N/A

== The owners ==
Colonel George W. Scott, merchant and farmer, came to Leon in 1852 from Pennsylvania. He was said to have a model farm. Scott fought in the American Civil War as head of "Scott's Cavalry".

In 1868 Scott ran for governor as a Democratic-Conservative but was defeated. Scott experimented in a variety of crops and planted 12 acres (49,000 m^{2}) of sugar cane, cabbage, collards, rutabagas, Dutch turnips. Scott also created a 16-foot (5 m) overshot waterwheel from a pond going to corn, sugar and cotton processing.

Scott came up with a revolutionary fertilizer which combined cottonseed with bone meal. Bone was obtained by black farm hands who earned a gallon of cane syrup for every 100-pound sack of animal bones. The bone were crushed with a heavy cast-iron stamp powered by a waterwheel and the meal mixed with sulfuric acid. This was then mixed with cottonseed cake to make a final product.

In 1870 Scott moved to Savannah, Georgia, then Atlanta, where he built his business. By 1887, the Gossypium Phospo made by the George W. Scott Company had become one of the most noted fertilizers in the south. (Tallahassee Weekly Floridian, January 28, 1886). In 1889, Scott founded Agnes Scott College.

Around 1884 or 1885 the Scott plantation was sold to a J. P. Castleman, who had moved to Tallahassee from the Dakota Territory.

== Sources ==
- Rootsweb Plantations
- Largest Slaveholders from 1860 Slave Census Schedules
- Paisley, Clifton; From Cotton To Quail, University of Florida Press, c1968.
