= Barrow Hill Plantation =

Cotton plantation in Florida, United States

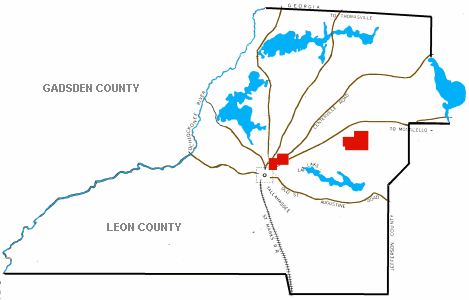
Location of Barrow Hill Plantation

Barrow Hill Plantation was a large forced-labor farm of 3,990 acres (1,610 ha) located in central Leon County, Florida, United States. It was established by John S. Winthrop, who by 1860 enslaved 71 people to work his land, which was primarily dedicated to growing cotton as a cash crop.

== Location ==
Barrow Hill Plantation had two tracts of land. The first tract would cover what is now western sections of E. Tennessee St, eastern parts of Miccosukee Road, and Leon High School. The second tract to the east bordered Joseph John Williams' La Grange Plantation on the west and would cover what is now a part of Chaires Cross, a part of Buck Lake Road, and Interstate 10.

== Plantation specifics ==
The Leon County Florida 1860 Agricultural Census shows that Barrow Hill Plantation had the following:

- Improved Land: 2,590 acres (1,050 ha)
- Unimproved Land: 1,400 acres (570 ha)
- Cash value of plantation: $10,000
- Cash value of farm implements/machinery: $500
- Cash value of farm animals: $3000
- Number of enslaved persons: 71
- Bushels of corn: 2,200
- Bales of cotton: 204

Agents on behalf of John Winthrop:

- R.S.D. Hays
- T.W. Lawrence

== The owner ==
John S. Winthrop was a native of New Bern, North Carolina. Information shows that in 1860, Winthrop was still a legal minor. Due to the SS Home wreck of 1837, Winthrop was due to receive a large property inheritance originally going to Henrietta Smith, his great-grandmother and mother of the deceased Mrs. Hardy Croom of Goodwood Plantation. John Winthrop, like other planters, would feel the effects of the American Civil War, losing plantation land and the legal right to enslave people. Winthrop eventually built a fine home in Tallahassee in 1890.

== John Winthrop's home ==
The below photos(?) are of John S. Winthrop's home at 610 N. Monroe Street in Tallahassee. The home was built in 1890 by John and his wife, Lilia Chouteau Winthrop.

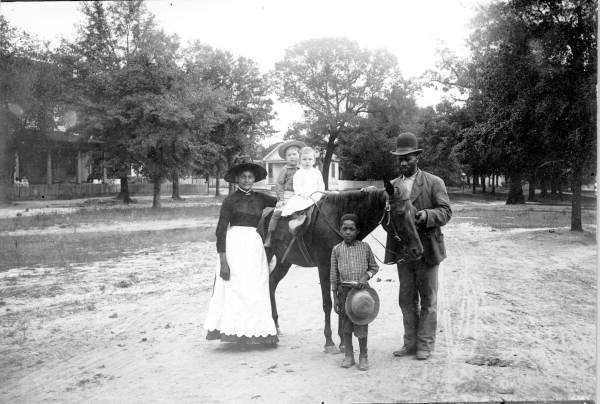
Francis B. Winthrop on horsevack behind Guy L. Winthrop

It later went to John's son Francis B. Winthrop, who served a term as Mayor of Tallahassee, and wife Gertude Chittenden Withrop who lived there from 1910-1925. Guy Winthrop and wife Ada Belle Winthrop inhabited after.
