= Daniel B. Meginniss Plantation =

The Daniel B. Meginniss Plantation was a forced-labor farm of 1,610 acres (650 ha) located in Leon County, Florida, United States established by Daniel B. Meginniss. In 1860, 70 enslaved people worked the land, which was primarily devoted to producing cotton as a cash crop.

== Plantation specifics ==
The Leon County Florida 1860 Agricultural Census shows that the Meginniss Plantation had the following:

- Improved Land: 800 acres (320 ha)
- Unimproved Land: 810 acres (330 ha)
- Cash value of plantation: $40,000
- Cash value of farm implements/machinery: $500
- Cash value of farm animals: $4150
- Number of slaves: 70
- Bushels of corn: 3000
- Bales of cotton: 150

== The owner ==
Daniel B. Meginniss was born in 1820 in Maryland. Meginniss is shown as a voter in the First Florida Election in 1845.

- 1845 voters
- 1860 plantations
- Paisley, Clifton; From Cotton To Quail, University of Florida Press, c1968.
