= Woodlawn Plantation (Florida) =

Plantation in Florida, United States

Coordinates: 30.4217°N 84.1175°W

Woodlawn Plantation was a large forced-labor farm built by Thomas Peter Chaires on St. Augustine Road immediately south of Chaires in eastern Leon County, Florida.

Chaires, along with his 2 brothers Green H. Chaires and Benjamin Chaires, established large plantations during the Florida Territorial Period of 1821–1845. Green Chaires would establish Evergreen Hills Plantation and Benjamin would establish Verdura Plantation.

== Plantation specifics ==
The Leon County Florida 1860 Agricultural Census shows that the Woodlawn Plantation had the following:

- Improved Land: N/A
- Unimproved Land: N/A
- Cash value of plantation: N/A
- Cash value of farm implements/machinery: N/A
- Cash value of farm animals: N/A
- Number of slaves: N/A
- Bushels of corn: N/A
- Bales of cotton: N/A

The plantations would eventually form the community hub of Chaires. In 2000 the community of Chaires was listed on the National Register of Historic Places.

== The owner ==
Chaires' father was Major Benjamin Chaires who laid out and named the area of Jacksonville, Florida in 1822. Chaires is also listed as a voter in First Florida Election of 1845.
