= Evergreen Hills Plantation =

Cotton plantation in Florida, United States

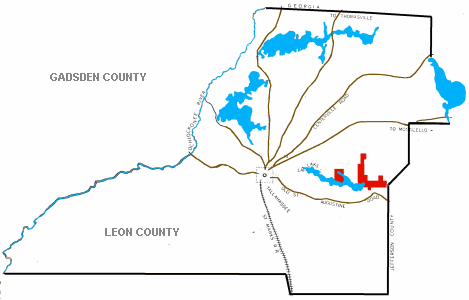
Location of Evergreen Hills Plantation.

Evergreen Hills Plantation was a large cotton plantation of 6700 acres (27 km^{2}) located in eastern Leon County, Florida, United States established by Green H. Chaires.

== Location ==
Evergreen Hills was located in 2 tracts. The first tract was bordered Joseph John Williams' La Grange Plantation on the north and the Francis Eppes Plantation to the east.

The second tract was at the east end of Lake Lafayette, Florida and bordered a 2nd tract of Chemonie Plantation on the east. Green's Evergreen Hills Plantation, with Benjamin's Vendura Plantation and Thomas Peter's Woodlawn Plantation, would form the community hub of Chaires, Florida. In 2000 the community of Chaires was listed on the National Register of Historic Places.

Today the Chaires-Capitola Community Park, the neighborhoods around Chaires Cross Road, Green Oak Drive, Boykin Road, Boyette Lane, Bucklake Road, Farraway Farms and others occupy the land.

== Plantation specifics ==
The Leon County Florida 1860 Agricultural Census shows that the Evergreen Hills Plantation had the following:

- Improved Land: 3600 acres (15 km^{2})
- Unimproved Land: 3100 acres (13 km^{2})
- Cash value of plantation: US$53,600
- Cash value of farm implements/machinery: $900
- Cash value of farm animals: $11,460
- Number of persons enslaved: 135
- Bushels of corn: 6000
- Bales of cotton: 350

== Owner ==
During Florida's Territorial Period (1821–1845). Green Hill Chaires along with brothers Benjamin Chaires of Vendura Plantation and Thomas Peter of Woodlawn Plantation moved to Leon County establishing very large plantations. Green Hill Chaires' first plantation started large and eventually grew to 20,000 acres (80 km^{2}) and had a large home on Lake Lafayette. During the Second Seminole War of 1835–1842, Chaires' wife and two of his children along with several slaves were massacred and the home was destroyed.

Green Hill Chaires' brother Benjamin laid out and named the area of Jacksonville in 1822. Green Hill Chaires had a son named Green Averitt Chaires. Chaires is also listed as a voter in First Florida Election of 1845.

Aside from being a plantation owner, Green Chaires built the state's first plank road, which connected Leon County plantations to the Gulf Coast shipping communities of Newport and St. Marks. Chaires served on the 1861–1865 Board of Directors of the Tallahassee Railroad.

== See also ==
- Chaires, Florida
