= Joseph Chaires Plantation =

Cotton plantation in Florida, United States

Coordinates: 30.426°N 84.166°W

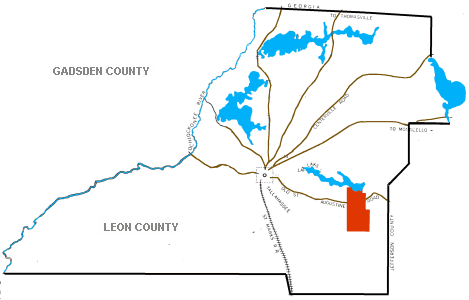
Location of Evergreen Hills Plantation

Joseph Chaires Plantation was a large cotton plantation of 3,800 acres (1,500 ha) located in southern Leon County, Florida, United States owned by Joseph Chaires.

== Location ==
The Joseph Chaires Plantation's northern border was located at the southeast tip of Lake Lafayette. The property extended southward across Old St. Augustine Road. Today that land encompasses part of U.S. 27, Louvinia Drive, County Road 2197 (Williams Road), County Road 2196 (Old St. Augustine Road), County Road 2195 (WW Kelly Drive) as far south as County Road 259 (Tram Road) near Lake Erie and Big Lake.

== Plantation specifics ==
The Leon County Florida 1860 Agricultural Census shows that the Joseph Chaires Plantation had the following:

- Improved Land: 1,400 acres (570 ha)
- Unimproved Land: 3,400 acres (1,400 ha)
- Cash value of plantation: $50,000
- Cash value of farm implements/machinery: $150
- Cash value of farm animals: $6,500
- Number of persons enslaved: 130
- Bushels of corn: 5000
- Bales of cotton: 200

== The owner ==
Joseph Chaires was the son of Benjamin Chaires and cousin of Green Averitt Chaires (1827-1902). Green Averitt Chaires was a Leon County Commissioner.
