= La Grange Plantation =

Plantation in Florida, United States

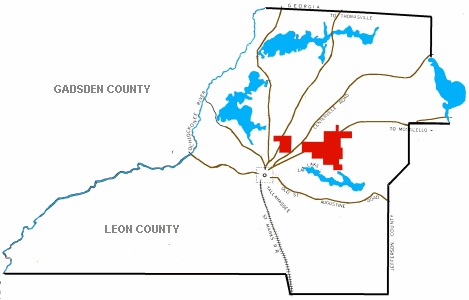
Location of La Grange Plantation

La Grange Plantation was a large forced-labor farm of 4,150 acres (1,680 ha) located in central Leon County, Florida, United States established by Joseph John Williams.

== Location ==
La Grange Plantation was located just east of Tallahassee in 2 tracts of land. The westernmost tract bordered the James Kirksey Plantation on the east and Barrow Hill Plantation on the south.

The second tract of land to the east and much larger than the first bordered R. A. Whitfield's The House Place Plantation on the west, Barrow Hill Plantation's second tract of land on the east, and to the south it bordered Evergreen Hills Plantation and the Francis Eppes Plantation.

== Plantation specifics ==
The Leon County Florida 1860 Agricultural Census shows that the La Grange Plantation had the following:

- Improved Land: 3,150 acres (1,270 ha)
- Unimproved Land: 1,000 acres (400 ha)
- Cash value of plantation: $55,200
- Cash value of farm implements/machinery: $3425
- Cash value of farm animals: $13,134
- Number of persons enslaved: 232
- Bushels of corn: N/A
- Bales of cotton: N/A

Purchasing agents for land, equipment and slaves:

- J. L. Stroman
- W. J. Akin
- R. B. Cole
- T. W. Ross
- D. F. Hurger

La Grange was Leon County's largest producer of cotton at the beginning of the Civil War. Williams would go on to inherit 7,000 acres (2,800 ha) of land from his father-in-law, Noah Thompson.

== Other Plantations ==
Williams had a total of 5 plantations in 1860 including Hickory Hill and Betton Hill. His total cotton production was 1113 bales from 3,900 acres (1,600 ha) of land. The total value of Williams' holdings was $121,000 and his slaves were worth $150,000. In today's value, his holding would be $2,109,030 and slave value at $2,614,500.

== The owner ==
Joseph John Williams home in 1955

Joseph John Williams was the son of General William Williams and Delia Haywood. J. J. Williams was the only surviving son of William and Delia when William died. Aside from agriculture, Jospeph John Williams was a voter in the 1st Statewide Election, Monday, May 26, 1845. Williams was also a Florida state representative from Leon County in 1860.

On November 19, 1876, Williams died from a heart attack in Raleigh, North Carolina while on a visit to see his mother. She had died the day before.

Joseph John Wiliams had a town home at 217 N. Calhoun Street which was built in 1839 for W.P. Gorman. It sold to Dr. English, a Harvard mathematics professor who came to Tallahassee for his health. Later sold to Williams as a town house for his family. The house was demolished in 1955.
