= Waverly Plantation (Leon County, Florida) =

Cotton plantation in Florida, United States

Coordinates: 30.3874°N 84.2187°W

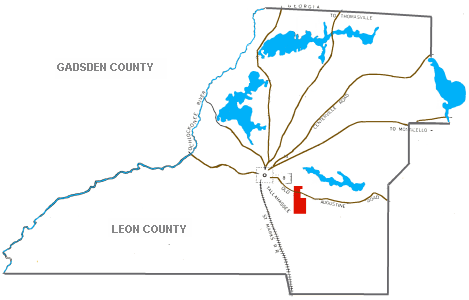
Approximate location of Waverly Plantation

Waverly Plantation was a large cotton-growing slave plantation of unknown size, located in southern Leon County, Florida, United States, owned by George Taliaferro Ward.

== Location ==
Waverly Plantation bordered the Southwood Plantation on the west.

=== Multiple plantation statistics ===
The Leon County Florida 1860 Agricultural Census shows that Southwood Plantation had the following:

Besides Waverly, Ward also maintained his plantations of Clifford Place and Southwood. Including Waverly, his holdings totaled 4,200 acres (1,700 ha) of which 2,500 acres (1,000 ha) were improved. Combined, Ward held 160 persons enslaved, produced 7500 bushels of corn and 500 bales of cotton.

== Owner ==
George Taliafero Ward was born in Kentucky in 1810 and moved to Tallahassee in 1825. In that same year Ward became Register of the Land Office, succeeding Samuel R. Overton. From 1838 to 1839 Ward served on the Legislative Council from Leon County and attended the Constitutional Convention.

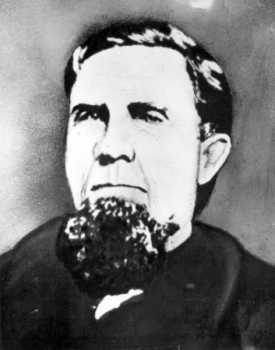
Colonel George T. Ward

George T. Ward inherited the land now known as Southwood from his father, George W. Ward.

In 1844 Ward married Sarah Jane Chaires of the wealthy Benjamin Chaires family of eastern Leon County and had at least three daughters, Georgima, Anna, and Mattie as well as brothers. Sarah Jane would inherit other properties that were later incorporated into Southwood.

The original mansion built in 1865 at Southwood was destroyed by fire. In 1939, George Henderson, grandson of Colonel John and Mattie Henderson, moved the family home from downtown Tallahassee to the old foundation of the original Southwood house.
