= Lake Hall =

Lake in the state of Florida, United States

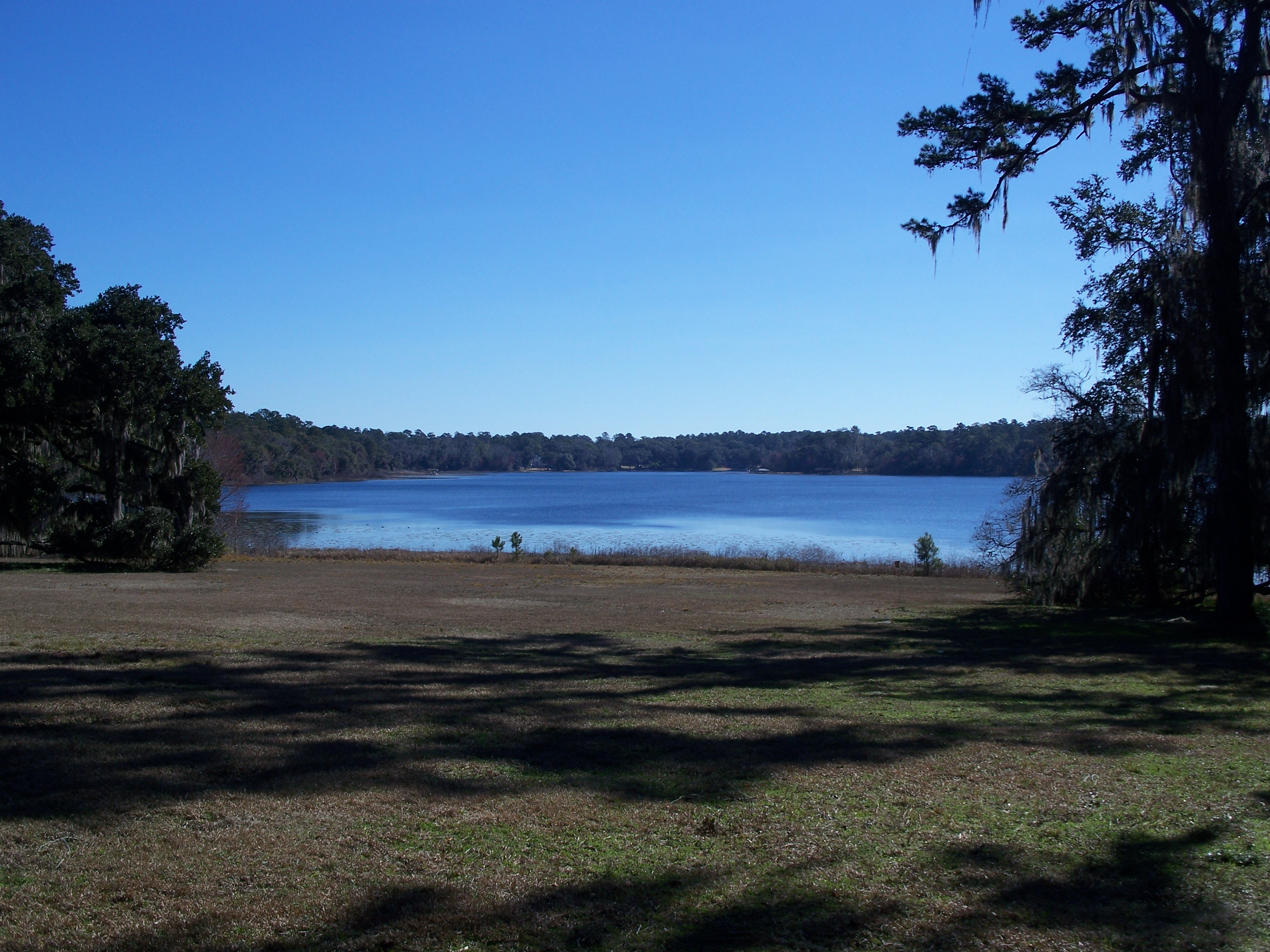
- View from Alfred B. Maclay Gardens State Park (September 2007)

- Location within Florida Location within the United States
- Location: Leon County, Florida
- Coordinates: 30°31′20″N 84°14′54″W
- Type: oligotrophic
- Basin countries: United States

Lake Hall is a small lake located in central Leon County, Florida, United States. It is located just north of Interstate 10 and slightly west of U.S. Highway 319 and within Tallahassee city limits.

Lake Hall forms the south, western, and part of the northern boundaries of Alfred B. Maclay Gardens State Park and is home to Capitol City Rowing. The other shores of Lake Hall are lined with private property and private homes.

== Hydrology ==
Lake Hall is classified as an oligotrophic lake and has the distinction of having the best water quality of all lakes in Leon County according to TAPP, a local water quality and conservation group. Due to its clarity, the lake is suspected to be spring fed although no connection has been found to the Floridan Aquifer via a sinkhole.

The lake supports beds of Vallisneria americana and Sagittaria stagnorum but contains no hydrilla. Some hydrilla was discovered in the southern lobe of the lake and grass carp were introduced to control the plant.

Fish found in Lake Hall include largemouth bass, bluegills bream, Crappie, Brown Bullhead Catfish, Channel Catfish, and Yellow Bullhead Catfish.

Lake Hall is also home to the swim portion of the Redhills Sprint Triathlon.

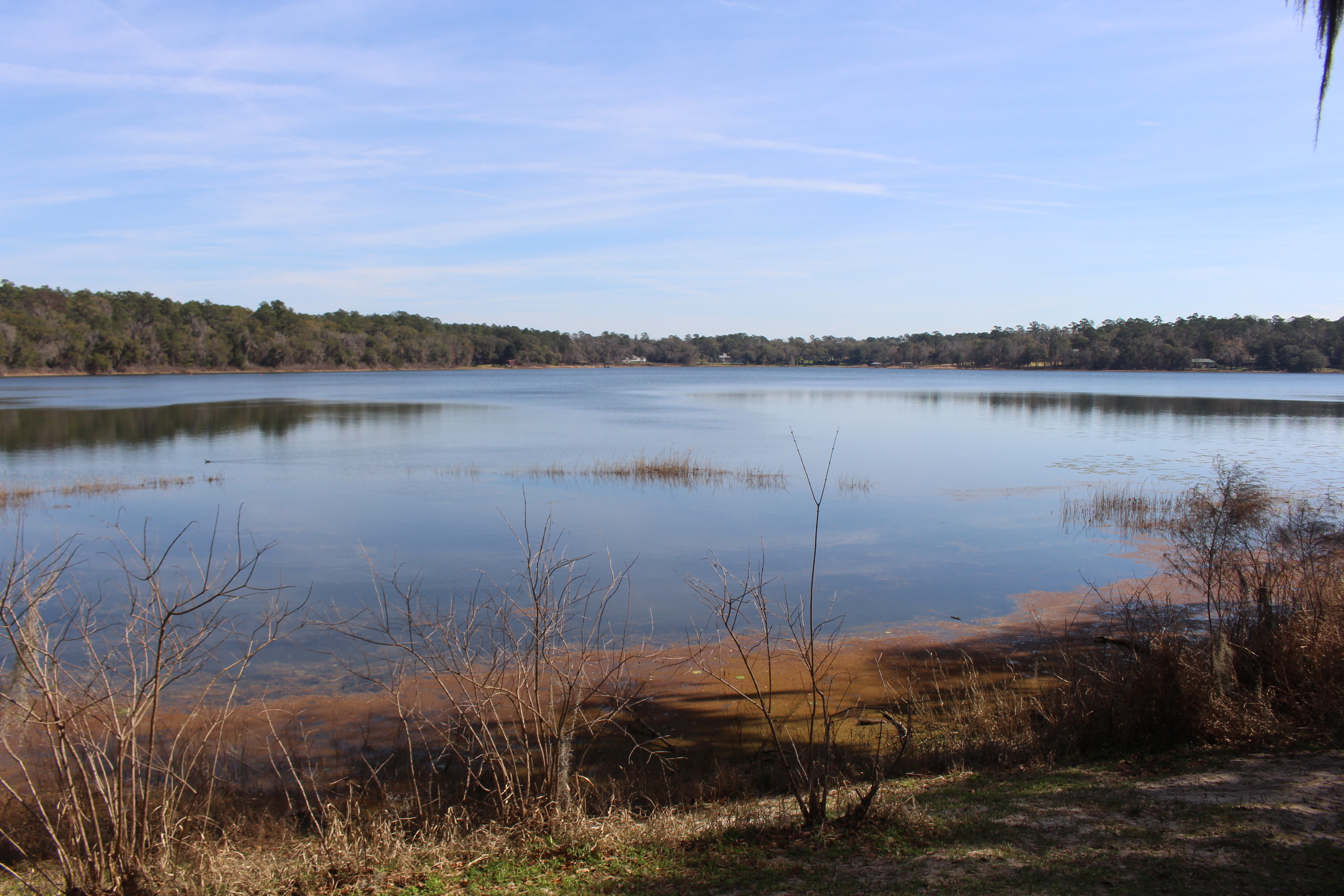
Photo of Lake Hall taken from Maclay Gardens
