= William A. Carr Plantation =

Coordinates: 30.5661°N 84.2716°W

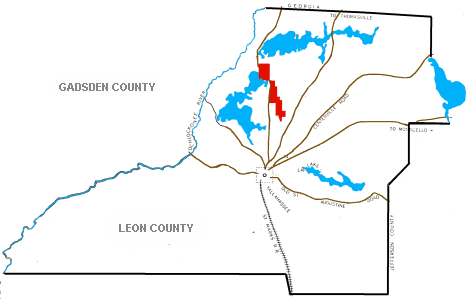
Location of Burgesstown Plantation

The William A. Carr Plantation was a small forced-labor farm growing cotton on 2,000 acres (8.1 km^{2}) in northwestern Leon County, Florida, established by William A. Carr.

== Location ==
The land was situated at the northern tip of Lake Carr and encompassed what is now the small unincorporated African American community of Blocker and the Cedar Hill Road area. Carr Lane, a road in northern Leon County just off Bannerman Road, is the remnant of William Carr in the area.

== Statistics ==
The Leon County, Florida 1860 Agricultural Census shows that the William A. Carr Plantation had the following:

- Improved land: 1000 acres (4 km^{2})
- Unimproved land: 1000 acres (4 km^{2})
- Cash value of plantation: $31,000
- Cash value of farm implements/machinery: $1000
- Cash value of farm animals: $5,000
- Number of enslaved persons: 77
- Bushels of corn: 5000
- Bales of cotton: 260

== Owner ==
William Carr was originally from Virginia. Outside of agriculture, Carr was a stockholder with the Georgia Railroad and Banking Company in 1838. In 1840, Carr was a complainant in a land case before the United States Supreme Court. Carr was also one of the first teachers at the all-black McBride School.
