= James Kirksey Plantation =

Plantation in Florida, United States

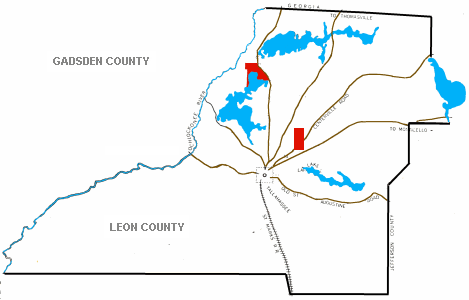
Location of the Kirksey Plantation

The James A. Kirksey Plantation was a moderate forced-labor farm of 2,600 acres (1,100 ha) located in northwestern Leon County, Florida, United States, established by James A. Kirksey. In 1847 he served as mayor of Tallahassee. He had a large number of slaves.

The James Kirksey plantation house was prefabricated in New York and built on the site in 1832. It is a 2-story home 55 ft (17 m) across the front and 33 ft (10 m) wide with porches on both floors wrapping from side to front to side. The house is supported with 16 fluted Doric columns (8 per floor). It is located at 325 N. Calhoun Street in Tallahassee.

It was photographed for the Historic American Buildings Survey.

== Location ==
The Kirksey Plantation was bordered on the north by Frederick R. Cotten's Burgesstown Plantation and on the east by the William A. Carr Plantation. Today the first section of 950 acres (380 ha) would be on the west side of North Meridian Road at Orchard Pond Road, including Buck Pond. The second section was 3 mi (4.8 km) north of Tallahassee on 1,280 acres (520 ha).

== 1860 plantation specifics ==
The Leon County Florida 1860 Agricultural Census shows that the James A. Kirksey Plantation had the following:

- Improved Land: 1,320 acres (530 ha)
- Unimproved Land: 1,280 acres (520 ha)
- Cash value of plantation: $33,000
- Cash value of farm implements/machinery: $500
- Cash value of farm animals: $3,405
- Number of enslaved persons: 180
- Bushels of corn: 6000
- Bales of cotton: 454

Though the plantation was not extremely large, it was the 4th largest in the county.

== The owners ==
The plantation was owned by James A. Kirksey who was born in 1804 and died in 1878. Though not a large plantation owner, James Kirksey was involved in state politics as an election inspector in 1845. and also a delegate to the Florida Secession Convention on January 10, 1861.

Around 1915 or 1916 the James Kirksey Plantation was purchased by Dr. Tennent Ronalds of Edinburgh, Scotland, who also owned Live Oak Plantation and Orchard Pond Plantation, a total personal estate of 6,437 acres (2,605 ha).
