= Southwood Plantation =

Cotton plantation in Florida, United States

Coordinates: 30.3973°N 84.1988°W

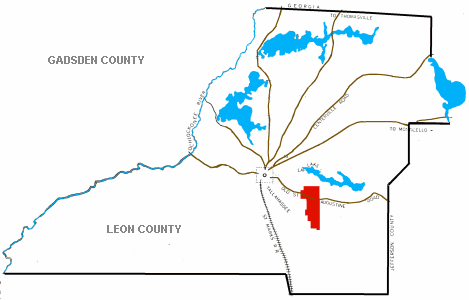
Location of the Southwood Plantation

Southwood Plantation was a large cotton plantation growing cotton on 5,000 acres (20 km^{2}) located in southern Leon County, Florida, United States and owned by George Taliafero Ward.

== Location ==
Southwood Plantation bordered the Francis Eppes Plantation on the north and the R. G. Shepard Plantation on the south.

== Owner ==
George Taliafero Ward was born in Kentucky in 1810 and moved to Tallahassee in 1825. In that same year, Ward became Register of the Land Office, succeeding Samuel R. Overton. From 1838 to 1839, Ward served on the Legislative Council from Leon County and attended the Constitutional Convention.

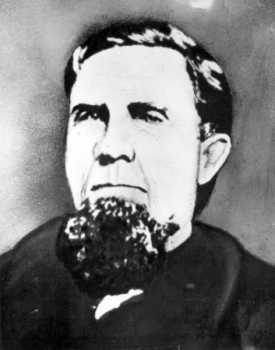
Colonel George T. Ward

George T. Ward inherited the land now known as Southwood from his father, George W. Ward.

In 1844, Ward married Sarah Jane Chaires of the wealthy Chaires family of eastern Leon County and had at least three daughters, Georgima, Anna, and Mattie, as well as brothers. Sarah Jane would inherit other properties that were later incorporated into Southwood.

The original mansion built in 1865 at Southwood was destroyed by fire. In 1939, George Henderson, grandson of Colonel John and Mattie Henderson, moved the family home from downtown Tallahassee to the old foundation of the original Southwood house.
