= George Taliaferro Ward =

American politician

George T. Ward
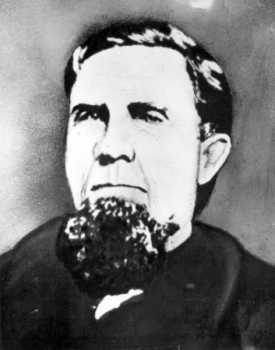
- George T. Ward
- Born: January 8, 1810; Fayette County, Kentucky, United States
- Died: May 5, 1862 (aged 52); Williamsburg, Virginia
- Military career
- Allegiance: Confederate States of America
- Branch: Confederate Army
- Service years: 1861–1862 (CSA)
- Rank: Colonel
- Commands: 2nd Florida Infantry
- Conflicts: Yorktown Siege; American Civil War
- Other work: Plantation owner Delegate: Florida Territorial Council; 1852 Candidate Governor of Florida

George Taliaferro Ward (1810 – May 5, 1862) was a major cotton planter and politician from Leon County, Florida. He served in the Confederate Army as a colonel during the American Civil War, dying near Williamsburg, Virginia.

== Early life and marriage ==
Ward was born in Fayette County, Kentucky, and moved with his family to Tallahassee, Florida Territory, in 1825.

He was appointed as Registrar of the territorial Land Office, succeeding Samuel R. Overton. In 1844 Ward married Sarah Jane Chaires, of the wealthy Chaires planter family of eastern Leon County, who had a large cotton plantation. The couple had at least three daughters, Georgiana, Anna, and Mattie, as well as sons. Mrs. Ward inherited properties that were later incorporated into their plantation known as Southwood. She died in 1859, at the age of 33.

== Career ==
A major planter in central Florida, George Ward owned Waverly, his wife's Southwood, and Clifford Place plantations. Combined, he held 160 slaves and produced annually 7500 bushels of corn and 500 bales of cotton.

Planters were known for conducting duels to carry out challenges of honor, and tensions rose in the years before the American Civil War. Ward, a Democrat, and Augustus Alston, a Whig, conducted a duel just north of Tallahassee. The duel allegedly stemmed from an event during the Second Seminole War. During that conflict, Alston was Colonel of a militia unit called the Leon Volunteers. On January 31, 1836, Lieutenant William Ward, brother of George T. Ward and one of the regimental drillmasters, presented Alston with a petition created by soldiers in his unit. The petition drew attention to the fact that their six-month enlistment period was up and that the troops wished to return home. Alston, after looking at the petition, told his second-in-command William C. Parish to "shoot the damned dog." Parish obeyed the order and drew his pistol and shot William Ward on the spot.

Prince Achille Murat was Ward's second, and Dr. Randolph of Tallahassee was the attending physician. Alston hit Ward first, breaking his leg with one shot and an arm with another. When Alston got directly over Ward, he had no shots left while Ward still had one. Alston was said to fold his arms and declare, "I believe he will kill me after all." Ward fired his last shot and missed.

Ward demanded more guns to continue the contest, but fainted before his instructions could be carried out. The two men later agreed to continue the duel, but before Ward recovered sufficiently to fight, Alston was killed in a duel with Florida Militia Brigadier General Leigh Read.

== Political ==
In 1838 and 1839, Ward served on the Florida Territorial Council. At the age of 18, he attended the Florida Constitutional Convention of 1838, in Port St. Joe, Florida.

In 1845 Ward voted in the first Florida election after it was admitted as a state. In 1852 Ward ran for Governor of Florida on the Whig ticket, losing to Democrat James E. Broome.

On February 4, 1861, George Ward was seated in the Montgomery Convention on secession. Ward, along with Abraham K. Allison, led a faction of the convention who wished to delay secession to see if Georgia and Alabama would secede first. If they did not, then the state should wait for Florida voters to decide on the ordinance of secession. Ward presented a number of ordinances in attempt to delay secession but all of them were defeated. Though Ward did eventually sign Florida's Ordinance of Secession, he was reluctant to do so, stating "When I die, I want it inscribed upon my tombstone that I was the last man to give up the ship."

In April 1861 he ran for and was elected to the Confederate Provisional Congress. Later that year he was elected colonel in the 2nd Florida Infantry.

== Civil War ==
In 1862 Ward's 2nd Florida Infantry was sent to Virginia to serve, where Colonel Ward participated at the Yorktown siege. He died on May 5, 1862, after being shot at the Battle of Williamsburg. According to a witness, Ward was struck once in the chest and once in the head. Ward's remains were left when the 2nd Florida retreated but several volunteers returned to retrieve the body under enemy fire.

A month after Ward's death, the Ward family was presented with a Confederate battle flag that the Second Florida had carried into battle.

== Legacy and honors ==
- San Marcos de Apalache located at St. Marks, Wakulla County, Florida, was renamed Fort Ward to honor him.

Party political offices
Preceded by Thomas Brown	Whig nominee for Governor of Florida; 1852	Succeeded by None
