= List of shipwrecks in October 1837 =

The list of shipwrecks in October 1837 includes ships sunk, foundered, wrecked, grounded, or otherwise lost during October 1837.

== 1 October ==
List of shipwrecks: 1 October 1837
Ship	State	Description
Caroline	Argentina	The schooner-brig was driven ashore at Montevideo, Uruguay.
Flor del Norte	Brazil	The schooner was driven ashore at Montevideo.
Jessie	United Kingdom	The ship was wrecked on the Arklow Bank, in the Irish Sea off the coast of County Wicklow. Her crew were rescued. She was on a voyage from Wick, Caithness to Cork.
Landais	France	The ship was wrecked near Land's End, Cornwall, United Kingdom. All on board were rescued.
Rafael	Spain	The brig was driven ashore at Montevideo.

== 2 October ==
List of shipwrecks: 2 October 1837
Ship	State	Description
Clio	United Kingdom	The ship was driven ashore at Starcross, Devon.
William	United Kingdom	The ship ran onto rock in the Restigouche River and was severely damaged. She was on a voyage from Restigouche, Lower Canada, British North America to Lancaster, Lancashire. She was consequently condemned.

== 3 October ==
List of shipwrecks: 3 October 1837
Ship	State	Description
Amytnas	United Kingdom	The ship was severely damaged on the Red Island Reef. She was on a voyage from Quebec City, Lower Canada, British North America to Exeter, Devon. Amytnas was refloated on 5 October and put back to Quebec City.
Flora	Hamburg	The ship was in collision with another vessel 8 nautical miles (15 km) east of Redcar, Yorkshire, United Kingdom and sank. Her crew survived. She was on a voyage from Hartlepool, County Durham, United Kingdom to Altona.
Pauline Marie	Belgium	The ship was driven ashore whilst on a voyage from Narva, Russia to Antwerp. She was later refloated and put back to Havre de Grâce.
Ranger	United Kingdom	The ship was driven onto rocks at Redcar. She was later refloated.
Swift	United Kingdom	The ship was driven onto rocks at Redcar. She was later refloated.
Thames	United Kingdom	The ship was driven to rocks at Redcar and was damaged. She was on a voyage from London to Stockton-on-Tees, County Durham. She was refloated the next day.

== 4 October ==
List of shipwrecks: 4 October 1837
Ship	State	Description
British Tar	United Kingdom	The ship was driven ashore and damaged at Richibucto, New Brunswick, British North America.
Colossus	United States	The whaler, a schooner was wrecked in the Crozet Islands. Six crew were rescued by Héroine (French Navy).
Dominica	United Kingdom	The ship was driven ashore at Point Levy, Lower Canada, British North America. She was on a voyage from Quebec City, Lower Canada to Cork. Dominica was refloated on 6 October and resumed her voyage.
Kirkley	United Kingdom	The ship was driven ashore and damaged at Richibucto.

== 5 October ==
List of shipwrecks: 5 October 1837
Ship	State	Description
Trent	United Kingdom	The ship was driven ashore at Scoughall, Lothian. She was on a voyage from Leith, Lothian to Hull, Yorkshire. Trent was later refloated and put back to Leith.
Victoria	United Kingdom	The ship was driven ashore at Margate, Kent. She was on a voyage from Milford Haven, Pembrokeshire to London. Victoria was refloated the next day.

== 6 October ==
List of shipwrecks: 6 October 1837
Ship	State	Description
Fortuna	United Kingdom	The ship was driven ashore at Redcar, Yorkshire. She was on a voyage from Newhaven, Sussex to South Shields, County Durham. She was refloated the next day and resumed her voyage.

== 7 October ==
List of shipwrecks: 7 October 1837
Ship	State	Description
Jane	United Kingdom	The brig was driven ashore and wrecked at Porto, Portugal. Her crew were rescued. She was on a voyage from Porto to London.

== 8 October ==
List of shipwrecks: 8 October 1837
Ship	State	Description
Betsey	(United Kingdom of Great Britain and Ireland) British North America	The ship was wrecked near Toney's River. Her crew were rescued.
Edward	United Kingdom	The ship departed from Quebec City, Lower Canada, British North America for Sunderland, County Durham. No further trace, presumed foundered with the loss of all hands.

== 9 October ==
List of shipwrecks: 9 October 1837
Ship	State	Description
Ceres	United States	The ship was wrecked off Merigomish, Nova Scotia, British North America.
Haddon House	United Kingdom	The ship was lost off Kalana, Russia. Her crew were rescued. She was on a voyage from Saint Petersburg, Russia to London.
Home	United States	Home. Racer's Storm: The paddle steamer was wrecked at Cape Hatteras, North Carolina with the loss of 90 lives. She was on a voyage from New York to Charleston, South Carolina.
Nouvelle France	France	The ship was driven ashore and damaged on the Bank of Quayriel. She was on a voyage from Île Bourbon to Bordeaux, Gironde. Nouvelle France was refloated the next day and taken into Bordeaux.
Typhis	France	The ship was driven ashore at Saint-Valery-sur-Somme.

== 10 October ==
List of shipwrecks: 10 October 1837
Ship	State	Description
Pride	United Kingdom	The ship was wrecked on the Cat Key. She was on a voyage from Jamaica to New York, United States.

== 11 October ==
List of shipwrecks: 11 October 1837
Ship	State	Description
Wild Irish Girl	United Kingdom	The schooner, on her maiden voyage, ran aground on the Blackwater Bank, in the Irish Sea. She was on a voyage from Liverpool, Lancashire to Trieste. She was later refloated and taken into Wexford.

== 12 October ==
List of shipwrecks: 12 October 1837
Ship	State	Description
Baltimore	United States	The ship was driven ashore on Flores Island, Azores. She was on a voyage from Cádiz, Spain to Boston, Massachusetts.
Hebe	United Kingdom	The ship collided with the steamship Transit (United Kingdom) and was beached in the Elbe. She was on a voyage from Goole, Yorkshire to Hamburg. Hebe was later refloated and taken into Cuxhaven.
Ingeborg Catharine	Norway	The ship was lost on this date.
Prins Oscar Minde	Norway	The ship was lost on this date.

== 13 October ==
List of shipwrecks: 13 October 1837
Ship	State	Description
Dowthorpe	United Kingdom	The ship was driven ashore at Krasnaya Gorka, near Saint Petersburg, Russia. She was on a voyage from Hull, Yorkshire to Saint Petersburg. Dowthorpe was refloated on 20 October and put into Kronstadt, Russia for repairs.
Frieundschaft	Danzig	The ship was driven ashore at Kronstadt, Russia.
Themis	United Kingdom	The ship ran aground on the Holm Sand and was damaged. She was on a voyage from South Shields, County Durham to London. Themis was refloated and taken in to Harwich, Essex in a leaky condition.

== 14 October ==
List of shipwrecks: 14 October 1837
Ship	State	Description
Elvina	Hamburg	The ship was wrecked in the Shetland Islands, United Kingdom with the loss of all but one of her crew. She was on a voyage from Hamburg to Jamaica.

== 15 October ==
List of shipwrecks: 15 October 1837
Ship	State	Description
Anders	Sweden	The ship was driven ashore at Thisted, Denmark. She was on a voyage from Gothenburg to Guernsey, Channel Islands.
John and William	United Kingdom	The ship was driven ashore at Valencia, Spain. She was refloated on 6 March 1838 and taken into Valencia for repairs.

== 16 October ==
List of shipwrecks: 16 October 1837
Ship	State	Description
Emelie	Norway	The ship was driven ashore near "Frederickshall".

== 17 October ==
List of shipwrecks: 17 October 1837
Ship	State	Description
Sir Charles McCarthy	(United Kingdom of Great Britain and Ireland) New South Wales	The brig was driven ashore at Holdfast Bay, South Australia. She was later refloated.

== 18 October ==
List of shipwrecks: 18 October 1837
Ship	State	Description
John and William Stanley	United Kingdom	The ship was driven ashore at Valencia, Spain.
Mary Somerville	United Kingdom	The ship was beached at Kingstown, County Dublin. She was on a voyage from Liverpool, Lancashire to Calcutta, India. Mary Somerville was refloated on 30 November and taken into Dublin.

== 19 October ==
List of shipwrecks: 19 October 1837
Ship	State	Description
Albatross	United Kingdom	The ship was driven ashore and damaged on Faial Island, Azores. She was later refloated.
Isabella	United Kingdom	The ship was abandoned in the Atlantic Ocean. Her four remaining crew were rescued by Ethelbert (United Kingdom), the rest having earlier taken to the ship's boat. Isabella was on a voyage from Newcastle upon Tyne, Northumberland to Quebec City, Lower Canada, British North America.
Lisette	Danzig	The ship was driven ashore on Bornholm, Denmark. Her crew were rescued. She was on a voyage from Danzig to Amsterdam, North Holland, Netherlands.
William	United Kingdom	The ship was driven ashore and wrecked at São Miguel Island, Azores. She was on a voyage from São Miguel Island to Faial Island.

== 20 October ==
List of shipwrecks: 20 October 1837
Ship	State	Description
Adelaide	United Kingdom	The ship was driven ashore on the coast of Gotland, Sweden. She was on a voyage from Riga, Russia to Dundee, Forfarshire. Adelaide was later refloated and put into "St. Plofholme".
John and Mary	United Kingdom	The ship struck rocks at Gamle Hellesund, Norway and was damaged. She was on a voyage from Saint Petersburg to London. John and Mary was refloated on 1 December and taken in to Christiansand.

== 21 October ==
List of shipwrecks: 21 October 1837
Ship	State	Description
Albury	United Kingdom	The ship was driven ashore and wrecked at the mouth of the Daugava. Her crew were rescued. She was on a voyage from Riga, Russia to London.
Harmony	United Kingdom	The ship was driven ashore and severely damaged at Stromness, Orkney Islands. She was on a voyage from Belfast, County Antrim to Wick, Caithness.Harmony was refloated on 25 October and taken into Stromness.
Kingston	United Kingdom	The ship ran aground at Saint John, New Brunswick, British North America and was severely damaged. She was on a voyage from Liverpool, Lancashire to Saint John. She was later refloated.
Matilda	United Kingdom	The ship ran aground on the Hooper Sands, in the Bristol Channel and was severely damaged.

== 22 October ==
List of shipwrecks: 22 October 1837
Ship	State	Description
Reussite	France	The ship was wrecked in the Raz de Sein. She was on a voyage from "Marames" to Dunkirk, Nord.

== 23 October ==
List of shipwrecks: 23 October 1837
Ship	State	Description
Mary Ann	United Kingdom	The ship was driven ashore at Rye, Sussex. She became a wreck on 24 October.

== 24 October ==
List of shipwrecks: 24 October 1837
Ship	State	Description
Mary Ann	United Kingdom	The ship ran aground on Davar Island". She was on a voyage from Londonderry to Southampton, Hampshire.

== 25 October ==
List of shipwrecks: 25 October 1837
Ship	State	Description
Boston Packet	United Kingdom	The ship was run down and sunk in the North Sea 10 nautical miles (19 km) off the mouth of the River Tees by Britannia (United Kingdom). Her crew were rescued.
Commerce	United Kingdom	The ship was driven ashore on Læsø, Denmark. She was on a voyage from Saint Petersburg, Russia to London.

== 26 October ==
List of shipwrecks: 26 October 1837
Ship	State	Description
Dwina	United Kingdom	The ship was wrecked on "Oronsa". Her crew were rescued. She was on a voyage from Newcastle upon Tyne, Northumberland to Porto, Portugal.
Earl Grey	United Kingdom	The ship was driven ashore near Black Combe, Cumberland. She was on a voyage from Fort William, Inverness-shire to Liverpool, Lancashire. Earl Grey was refloated on 17 November and taken into Harrington, Cumberland.
Maltland	United Kingdom	The ship was wrecked on Miquelon.
Synosure	United Kingdom	The ship was driven ashore at Stornoway, Isle of Lewis. She was later refloated with assistance from HMRC Speedy ( Board of Customs).

== 27 October ==
List of shipwrecks: 27 October 1837
Ship	State	Description
Colonist	United Kingdom	The West Indiaman was destroyed by fire off Portsmouth, Hampshire. All on board were rescued. She was on a voyage from London to Barbados. The wreck was beached at Haslar.
Commerce	United Kingdom	The ship was driven ashore on Læsø, Denmark. She was on a voyage from Saint Petersburg, Russia to London.
Killigrew	United Kingdom	The ship was wrecked on the coast of Connemara, County Galway with the loss of all hands. She was on a voyage from Cádiz, Spain to Limerick.
Pride	United Kingdom	The schooner was wrecked in a hurricane at Nassau, Bahamas. She was on a voyage from Jamaica to Savannah, Georgia, United States.
Sociable	United Kingdom	The smack was wrecked on the Shipwash Sand, in the North Sea off the coast of Essex. Her crew were rescued.

== 28 October ==
List of shipwrecks: 28 October 1837
Ship	State	Description
Cherub	United Kingdom	The schooner ran aground on the Goodwin Sands, Kent and was abandoned by her crew. She was on a voyage from Cádiz, Spain to Leith, Lothian.
Hero	United Kingdom	The ship was wrecked on Rough Isle. She was on a voyage from Belfast, County Antrim to Maryport, Cumberland.
Louise	France	The ship ran aground on the Bohnlehn Rocks, off the coast of Sweden. She was on a voyage from Roscoff, Finistère to a Norwegian port.
Mary Ann	(United Kingdom of Great Britain and Ireland) British North America	The ship was driven ashore on Table Island. She was on a voyage from Liverpool, Lancashire, United Kingdom to Pugwash, Nova Scotia. Mary Ann was consequently condemned.
Neptunus	Sweden	The ship sank off Gothenburg. Her crew were rescued.
Resolute	United Kingdom	The ship was driven onto the Querns. She was on a voyage from London to Dublin. Resolute waslater refloated and taken into Ramsgate, Kent.
Synosure	United Kingdom	The ship was driven ashore at Stornoway, Isle of Lewis, Outer Hebrides. She was on a voyage from Saint Petersburg, Russia to Liverpool. Synosure was refloated with assistance from HMRC Speedy ( Board of Customs).

== 29 October ==
List of shipwrecks: 29 October 1837
Ship	State	Description
Eagle	United Kingdom	The ship ran aground on the Gunfleet Sand, in the North Sea off the coast of Essex. She was on a voyage from Havre de Grâce, Seine-Inférieure to Newcastle upon Tyne, Northumberland. Eagle was later refloated and taken in to Harwich, Essex.
Jason	United Kingdom	The ship was driven ashore on Læsø, Denmark. She was on a voyage from London to Danzig. Jason was refloated the next day.
Margaret	United Kingdom	The ship was driven ashore on Læsø. She was on a voyage from Saint Petersburg, Russia to Grangemouth, Stirlingshire. Margaret was refloated on 3 November and taken into Helsingør, Denmark.
Providentia	Hamburg	The ship departed from Pillau, Prussia for Bremen. No further trace, presumed foundered in the Baltic Sea with the loss of all hands.

== 30 October ==
List of shipwrecks: 30 October 1837
Ship	State	Description
Ant	United Kingdom	The ship was in collision with Brothers (United Kingdom) off Harwich, Essex and was beached.
Barbara	United Kingdom	The ship was wrecked whilst on a voyage from Harrington, Cumberland to Dumfries. Her crew were rescued.
Caledonia	United Kingdom	The brig capsized in the Atlantic Ocean with the loss of seven of her twelve crew. Survivors were rescued on 9 November by Wartrue (Russia). Caledonia was on a voyage from Quebec City, Lower Canada, British North America to Loch Crinan.
Enmore	United Kingdom	The ship was driven ashore at Kingsdown, Kent. She was later refloated.
Favourite	United Kingdom	The ship was driven ashore in Broadhaven Bay.
Jonge Gerbrand	Russia	The ship was driven ashore on Læsø, Denmark. She was on a voyage from Riga to Bordeaux, Gironde, France.
Princess Victoria	United Kingdom	The ship ran aground on the Goodwin Sands, Kent and was damaged. She was on a voyage from Cádiz, Spain to Hull, Yorkshire. Princess Victoria was refloated and taken into Ramsgate, Kent.
Rosehill	United Kingdom	The ship was wrecked at Havana, Cuba. She was on a voyage from Newport, Monmouthshire to Havana.

== 31 October ==
List of shipwrecks: 31 October 1837
Ship	State	Description
Affo	United Kingdom	The ship was driven ashore at Boscastle, Cornwall.
Ayr	United Kingdom	The ship was driven ashore at Madras, India.
Delight	United Kingdom	The ship was driven ashore and wrecked 4 nautical miles (7.4 km) south of Madras. She was on a voyage from Penang to Mauritius and London.
Favourite	United Kingdom	The ship was driven ashore at Westport, County Mayo. She was refloated on 11 November.
Frederick	Danzig	The ship was wrecked on Flekkerøy, Denmark. She was on a voyage from Danzig to Harlingen, Friesland, Netherlands.
George IV	United Kingdom	The ship was driven onto rocks at Tralee, County Kerry. She was on a voyage from Liverpool, Lancashire to Tralee.
Heart of Oak	United Kingdom	The ship was driven ashore at Stranraer, Wigtownshire. She was on a voyage from "Rathmilton" to Runcorn, Cheshire.
Hebe	United Kingdom	The ship was driven ashore and wrecked south of Madras.
Isabella	United States	The schooner capsized in the Atlantic Ocean with the loss of two of the four people on board. She was on a voyage from New York to Wilmington, North Carolina. The survivors were taken off the wreck on 4 November by Forest (United Kingdom).
Mary	United Kingdom	The sloop struck a rock off Horse Isle, ayrshire and sank. Her crew were rescued.
Monmouth	United States	The steamship collided with Trenton (United States) and sank in the Mississippi River at Prophet Island Bend with the loss of 313 lives.
Penally	United Kingdom	The ship was driven ashore at Boscastle.

== Unknown date ==
List of shipwrecks: Unknown date in October 1837
Ship	State	Description
Albion	United Kingdom	The steamship was driven ashore and damaged at "Pile Foudry". She was later refloated and taken into Maryport, Cumbria, where she arrived on 3 November.
Arundel	United Kingdom	The ship was wrecked in the River Severn at Sharpness, Gloucestershire on or before 19 October.
Duguay Trouin	France	The ship foundered in the Baltic Sea. All on board were rescued. She was on a voyage from Saint Petersburg, Russia to Havre de Grâce, Seine-Inférieure.
Elizabeth	United Kingdom	The ship was abandoned in the Atlantic Ocean before 22 October.
Isabella	United Kingdom	The ship was driven ashore in the Gut of Canso before 16 October. She was on a voyage from Pictou, Nova Scotia, British North America to Greenock, Renfrewshire.
Jessie	(United Kingdom of Great Britain and Ireland) New South Wales	The cutter was driven ashore and wrecked at Port Stephens Point with the loss of all hands. She was on a voyage from Sydney to Newcastle.
Massachusetts	United Kingdom	The ship was abandoned in the Atlantic Ocean before 4 October.
New Orleans	United States	The ship was wrecked on the south coast of Cuba. She was on a voyage from Liverpool, Lancashire, United Kingdom to Havana, Cuba.
Phœnix	United Kingdom	The ship foundered in the Baltic Sea. All on board were rescued.
Success	United Kingdom	The sloop was in collision with Monarch (United Kingdom) in the River Thames and sank with the loss of a crew member.
Thames	United Kingdom	The ship was wrecked in the Bosphorus before 9 October with the loss of all hands. She was on a voyage from Odesa to Liverpool, Lancashire.
Victoria	United Kingdom	The ship was driven ashore at Margate, Kent. She wason a voyage from Milford Haven, Pembrokeshire to London. Victoria was refloated on 6 October.
