= SS Home =

Steamship, 1836–1837

Coordinates: 35.2451°N 75.5146°W

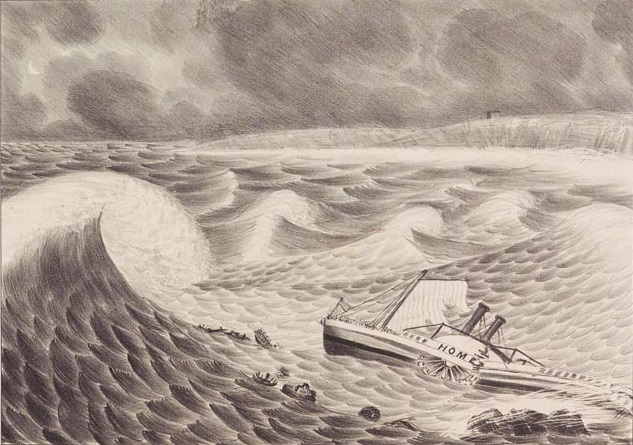
- Nathaniel Currier's hand-colored lithograph, Awful Wreck of the STEAM PACKET HOME: on her passage from New York to Charleston, by which melancholy occurrence NINETY-FIVE PERSONS PERISHED

History

United States
- Name: SS Home
- Owner: Red Bank line, New York City
- Operator: Carleton White
- Builder: Allaire Works, New York City
- Launched: 1837
- Fate: Wrecked off Cape Hatteras, 9 October 1837
- Notes: 130 on board

General characteristics
- Tonnage: 537
- Length: 220 ft (67 m)
- Beam: 22 ft 6 in (6.9 m)
- Propulsion: marine steam engine; 2 side paddles

SS Home was a steam packet ship built in 1836 and wrecked in 1837 during Racer's Storm with a loss of 90 lives. She was commanded by Captain Carleton White.

== History ==
In 1836, James P. Allaire, John Haggerty, and Charles Morgan planned to add two steamers to their line of ships running under the name of the New York and Charleston Steam Packet Company. By late, 1837, their company was running only one steam packet between New York and Charleston, South Carolina, the Columbia. After some delays, the partners launched the New York and the SS Home early in 1837 to carry passengers and cargo, including US Mail.

The Home was a large and fast coastal steamer which provided accommodations for 120 passengers and could make the trip between New York and Charleston in 64 hours. It cost nearly $90,000 to complete the ship, but it was already running profitably on its first two journeys. On its third trip from New York on October 7, 1837, however, Home ran aground in the harbor. Thinking that the ship was not damaged after an inspection, the master recommenced the journey. Their inspection failed to detect a water leak in the machinery, which caused and engine failure when the Home faced a storm near Cape Hatteras, North Carolina.

Home was built for Mr. James P. Allaire, of New York City, a paddle steamer of 537 tons, 220 feet (67 m) long and with a beam of 22 feet (6.7 m), propelled by two sidewheels mounted amidships. Like other ships of her day, Home had masts, sails, and rigging as well.

Home was built for river trade, but was converted into a passenger ship. Her interior was paneled in deep mahogany and cherrywood with skylights, saloons, and luxurious passenger quarters. A total of US$115,000 was spent converting Home for ocean voyages, but she was equipped with only three lifeboats and two life preservers. She was uninsured.

== Loss ==
On Saturday, 7 October 1837, Home left New York City for Charleston, South Carolina, with about 90 passengers and 40 crew aboard. Home had made only two previous voyages to Charleston. Home struck a sandbar off New Jersey. Unaware of the extent of the damage, her captain proceeded on schedule for Charleston. She encountered the 1837 Racer's Storm and started taking on water as she rounded Cape Hatteras, North Carolina. She was put aground to ride out the developing storm. Before rescue operations could be effected the next day, the Home was torn to pieces by the surf and 90 people died.

=== Notable passengers lost in the disaster ===
- The Hardy Croom family of Tallahassee, Florida. Hardy Croom established one of Tallahassee's premier cotton plantations called Goodwood Plantation.
- Oliver H. Prince and wife Mary Prince. Oliver was on the Board of Trustees of the University of Georgia and had been a United States senator from Georgia as well as Georgia State Senator.

== Bibliography ==
- Baughman, James P. (1968). Charles Morgan and the Development of Southern Transportation. Nashville: Vanderbilt University Press.
