= Goodwood Plantation =

Historic house in Florida, United States

- Goodwood Museum & Gardens
- U.S. National Register of Historic Places
- Location within Florida Location within the United States
- Location: Leon County, Florida
- Nearest city: Tallahassee
- Coordinates: 30°27′29″N 84°15′28″W
- Architectural style: Antebellum
- NRHP reference No.: 72000334
- Added to NRHP: June 30, 1972

Goodwood Plantation (also known as Old Croom Mansion) was a mid-sized slave plantation that grew cotton on about 1,675 acres (7 km^{2}) in central Leon County, Florida. It is located at 1600 Miccosukee Road. The plantation was added to the U.S. National Register of Historic Places on June 30, 1972.

In 1824, in recognition of his military service during the Revolutionary War, the Marquis de Lafayette was granted a full township in the Florida Territory by the United States Congress. This tract was called the Lafayette Land Grant and encompassed over 23,000 acres. Lafayette never visited his property but designated an agent to sell parcels of it on his behalf. Hardy Croom purchased 2,400 acres from the Lafayette Grant and built Goodwood Plantation on it in 1834.

== Goodwood Museum & Gardens ==
The plantation home is now a historic house museum that features original family furniture, porcelain, textiles, glassware, art and personal effects from the era of the First World War.

== Plantation specifics ==
The 1850 U.S. Federal Census Slave Schedule listed Bryan Croom as owning 129 enslaved people. However, at that time he also controlled some 40 enslaved people who were owned by his mother-in-law, Ann Hawks, who lived with Bryan Croom. In 1858 Arvah Hopkins bought the plantation and 41 enslaved people.

The Leon County Florida 1860 Agricultural Census documented the following for Goodwood Plantation:

- Improved Land: 1050 acres (4 km^{2})
- Unimproved Land: 625 acres (2½ km^{2})
- Cash value of plantation: $33,640
- Cash value of farm implements/machinery: $600
- Cash value of farm animals: $3000
- Number of slaves: unknown
- Bushels of corn: 2500
- Bales of cotton: 150

It is not known why no enslaved people are listed in 1860.

For a short period of time, at Goodwood's greatest extent, in the 1850s when owned by Bryan Hardy Croom, it constituted some 8,000 non-contiguous acres.

== The owners ==
The Croom family of Lenoir County, North Carolina, wealthy tobacco planters, began purchasing land in North Florida in the 1820s, including plantations in Marianna, Quincy and Tallahassee. Hardy Bryan Croom, a planter and amateur naturalist, brought attention to the now rare stinking cedar. He began amassing the land for the estate which come to be known as Goodwood, purchasing about 640 acres (2.6 km^{2}) of the Lafayette Land Grant in 1833. His younger brother, Bryan Hardy Croom, made similar purchases. Bryan first began living at Rocky Comfort Plantation in Gadsden County, on land the men's father, William, had purchased. Bryan was married to Eveline Hawks, and the couple had no children. The brothers had some 60 enslaved people from their North Carolina plantations transported down to Florida, and throughout the Croom years, purchased many more slaves to operate their cotton, corn and other row crop plantations.

But Hardy's time in Florida was to be short. On Saturday, October 7, 1837, Hardy B. Croom and his wife, two daughters, his son and a maternal aunt boarded the packet steamer S.S. Home in New York City bound for Charleston. Hardy's family was going to live in Charleston for a time before moving to Tallahassee. The Home sank off the coast of North Carolina during the 1837 Racer's Storm, a hurricane. About 30 people survived but approximately 90 people drowned, Hardy and his family among them. No will was found, so his brother Bryan assumed he had inherited his brother's Florida plantation property and proceeded accordingly.

A small home had already been framed in at the Goodwood site when Hardy died and Bryan's enslaved workers completed it. He ordered construction of a long-planned 10,000 square-foot mansion some years later. The house, whose Italianate design with ornate burgundy railings Hardy may have chosen before his death, was also built by slave labor. According to Richard Shine, the prominent Tallahassee builder and businessman who oversaw the construction, it was finished around 1850. A financial depression, yellow fever epidemics and a banking crisis it likely delayed its completion. The reason the plantation was named Goodwood is unclear, but it was known in family letters by that name in the 1840s. Contemporaneous newspaper articles refer to Goodwood in the 1850s.

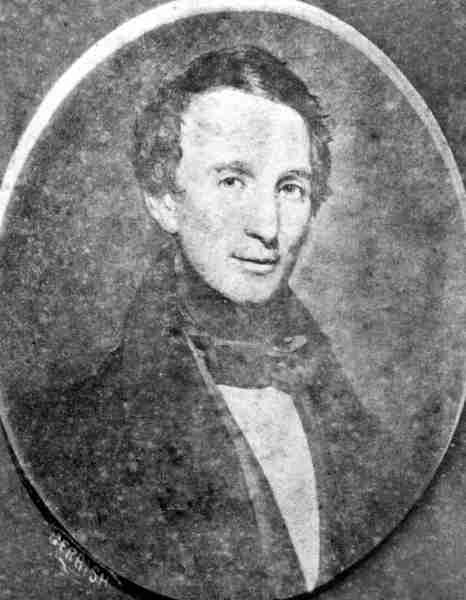
Hardy Croom (1837)

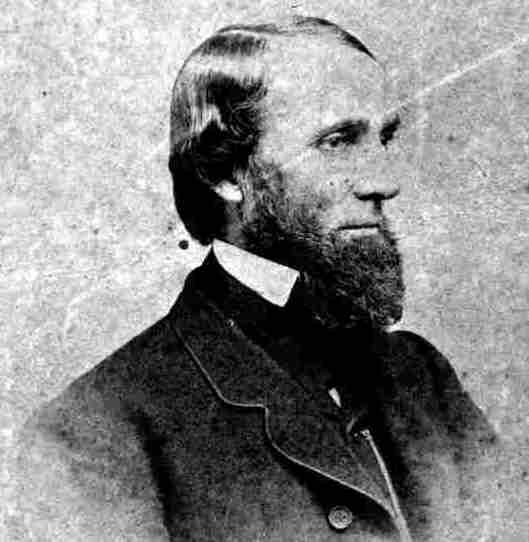
Arvah Hopkins (1866)

After Frances Hardy's death her relatives, primarily her mother Henrietta Smith, fought what became a landmark court case. Who would inherit when an entire family perished in a common disaster without a will? Bryan Croom won in lower court proceedings. But the Florida Supreme Court ultimately awarded the Smith family much of the estate in 1857. The issues were two; was Hardy a resident of North Carolina at the time of his death or of Florida where his large plantation interests were? The laws of the two states differed. The second question was whether Hardy himself or someone in the maternal line died last in the shipwreck. The Florida Supreme Court decided Hardy was a North Carolina resident when he died. The Court also decided, based on his last letters, that he had not intended to establish residency in Florida when he boarded the Home, but had decided to relocate his family to Charleston, South Carolina, where he had rented a house. Witnesses who survived the shipwreck testified that they saw his son clinging to a spar in the ocean after all the other Crooms had perished. He, a descendant of the maternal line, was the last surviving member of the family.

Bryan Croom moved to Alabama. Mrs. Smith did not live at Goodwood but sold the estate in1858 to Arvah Hopkins. He purchased 1,576 acres of land and 41 enslaved people. Hopkins operated a large store downtown and also made money selling on commission. He continued small-scale farming operations at the until 1865 and continued after the war, using formerly enslaved laborers as share-croppers and tenant farmers.

In 1885 an Englishman, Dr. William Lamb Arrowsmith, purchased Goodwood and 160 acres (0.65 km^{2}) surrounding it. When Arrowsmith died about eight months later his wife and her companion, Martha Dykes, lived on the estate for more than twenty-five years.

Mrs. Arrowsmith sold Goodwood to an extremely wealthy widow, Mrs. Alexander (Frances) Tiers, in 1911. She was related by marriage to the owners of the Waverly Plantation adjacent to Goodwood. She spent only the winter months at Goodwood. She entertained lavishly, many of her wealthy friends coming from the north to enjoy North Florida's warm winters, so she remodeled the house to a Mount Vernon style and replaced the wrought iron with Georgian columns. She renovated three other antebellum structures: the original kitchen, the original small house and a building whose original use may have been a storehouse or a place where bricks were made or other plantation industries occurred. These buildings still stand. Mrs. Tiers added a water tower, replacing the wells, cisterns and pumps that supplied the plantation. She built an amusement hall, guest cottages, servant quarters, a heated swimming pool, tennis courts and a carriage house.

She sold Goodwood in 1925 to Florida State Senator William C. Hodges. He and his wife Margaret entertained lavishly at Goodwood, inviting politicians artists, writers and public figures. Hodges died in 1940. In 1948 Margret married Thomas Milton Hood, a West Virginia native and Army Air Corps major. When she died in 1978, Major Hood began planning for the restoration of Goodwood as a house museum and public park. He established the Margaret E. Wilson Foundation in her memory. Hood died in 1990, having resisted calls to sell or donate Goodwood to allow it to be torn down for development. After his death the Margaret E. Wilson Foundation, which he created, and its operating agent Goodwood Museum and Gardens, Inc. assumed stewardship for Goodwood.

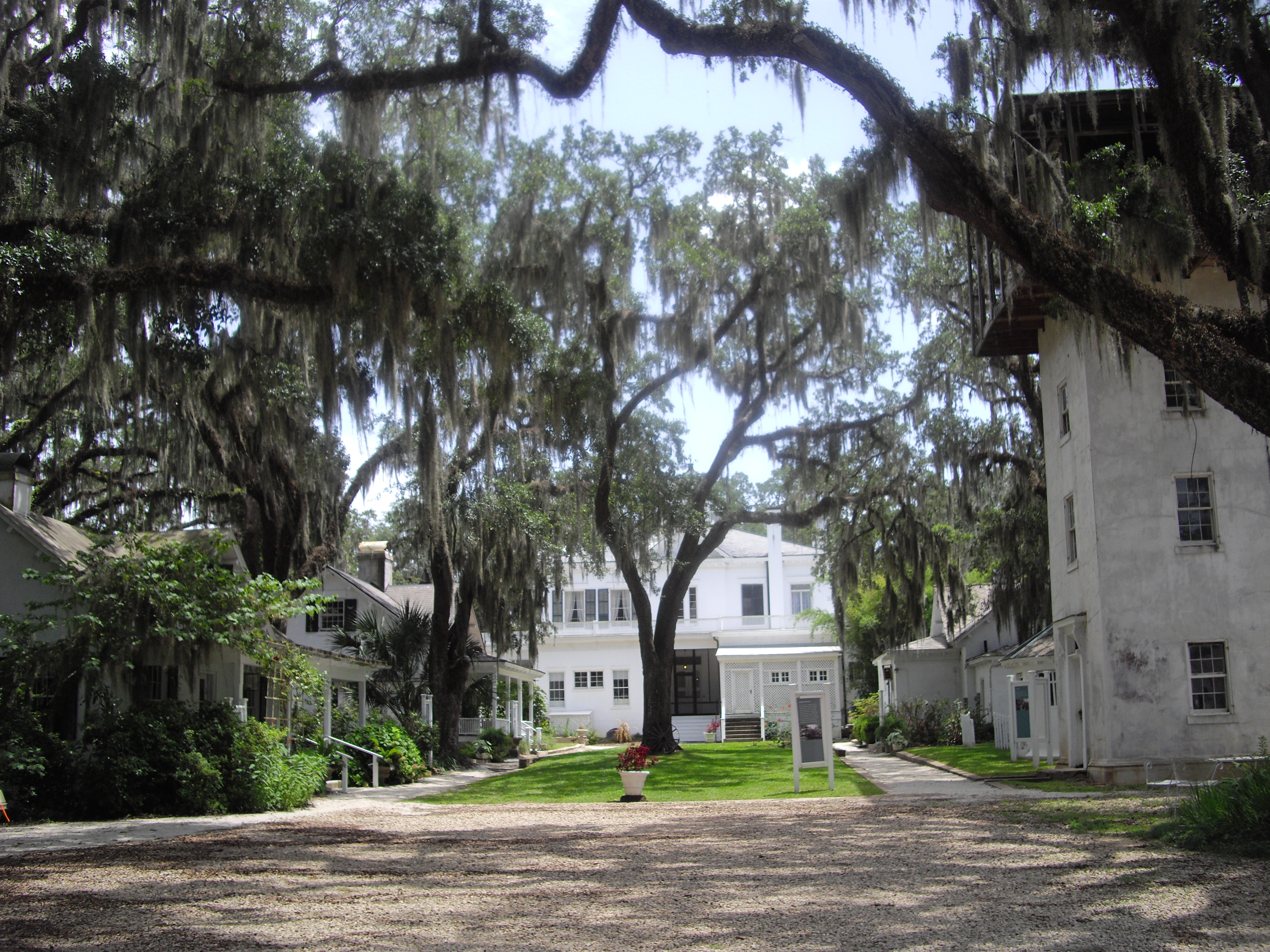
View from the Carriage House.

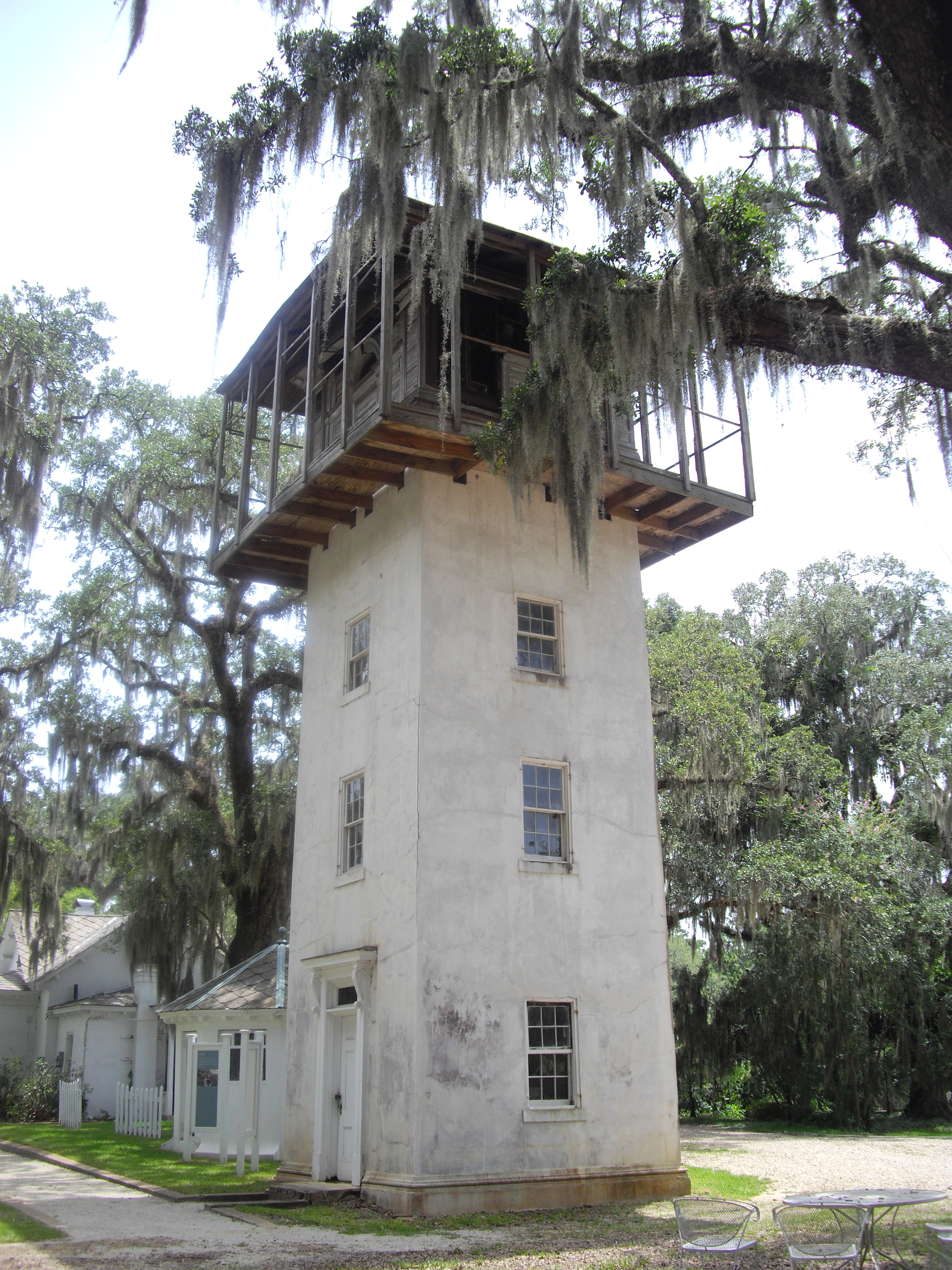
Tower under renovation, as it appeared in 2010.

== See also ==
- Plantations of Leon County
