= Neptune (1837 steamboat) =

American ship

History
- Name: New York
- Owner: Charles Morgan (1837); James Pennoyer, (1838)
- Operator: Captain J. T. Wright, Captain John D. Phillips
- Port of registry: New York City, number 340
- Route: New York and Charleston; New Orleans and Galveston
- Completed: 1837

General characteristics
- Tonnage: 745
- Installed power: Steam engine, wind
- Sail plan: Auxiliary sail

Neptune is a former steam packet which served a route between New York and Charleston, South Carolina, and later served a route between New Orleans and Galveston, Texas.

== New York–Charleston packet ==
Neptune was built in 1837 for the New York and Charleston Steam Packet Company. In 1838, a reorganization of the partnership led to the sale of Neptune to James Pennoyer.

== New Orleans–Galveston packet ==
Neptune competed for the New Orleans to Galveston trade in the early 1840s, challenging the New York. The steamer could lodge thirty persons in the cabin, and had a steerage capacity of forty. It broke a speed record for the route in 1841 when it reached New Orleans in a mere forty hours, shaving a full five hours off the previous record.
