= Oliver H. Prince =

American politician

Oliver Hillhouse Prince
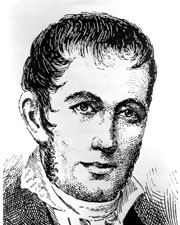

United States Senator from Georgia
- In office November 7, 1828 – March 3, 1829
- Preceded by: Thomas W. Cobb
- Succeeded by: George Troup

Member of the Georgia House of Representatives
- In office 1824

Personal details
- Born: July 31, 1782 Montville, Connecticut
- Died: October 9, 1837 (aged 55) Ocracoke Inlet, North Carolina
- Party: Jacksonian

Oliver Hillhouse Prince (July 31, 1782 – October 9, 1837) was an editor, attorney and politician, elected as United States Senator by the Georgia state legislature in 1828. Born in Connecticut, he had migrated as a child with his parents to Georgia, where he grew up. After working as a journalist and attorney, he was elected to the state senate. He prepared A Digest of the Laws of the State of Georgia (1822), for 30 years the most important collection of the state's laws.

In 1830 Prince left the law to become editor of the Georgia Journal, returning to early work in journalism. With his multi-faceted career, he was describe as "one of the brilliant figures of Georgia in the first half of the nineteenth century". He and his wife died on October 9, 1837, in the wreck of the SS Home, grounded near Ocracoke Inlet, North Carolina, during Racer's Storm. This was the first hurricane recorded as attacking both the Gulf and Atlantic coasts.

== Early life, education and marriage ==
Born in Montville, Connecticut in 1787, Oliver Hillhouse Prince completed his first studies locally. In 1796 he moved with his parents to Georgia, where they settled in Washington, Wilkes County. His mother's Hillhouse family included ancestors who were judges and her brother James Hillhouse was a US Senator. Oliver's maternal uncle David Hillhouse had already settled in the state when his parents moved there.

Prince later engaged in newspaper work as an assistant editor for The Monitor, a Wilkes County newspaper, from 1803 to 1806. Tradition has it that Prince wrote many humorous articles as a young man during this period. But in files of the Monitor, there are no humorous articles attributed to Prince. In fact, nowhere in the surviving issues of the paper is there any other item that might fairly be described as a "humorous sketch." However, he was described by 20th-century historians as "remarkably gifted with the literary instinct which he possessed with the most delicious sense of humor." At the same time, he "read the law." At age 19 in 1806, he gained admission to the bar by special act of the legislature, as he was under age. He began his practice in Macon.

In 1817 Prince married Mary Ross Norman of Lincoln County, Georgia, who was eighteen, a typical age of marriage for young Georgia women. Their first two children died young in 1822, and they moved to newly established Bibb County, Georgia. They had three more children: Virginia (b. 1825), another daughter and son Oliver H. Prince, Jr.

== Legal and political career ==
Prince became active in politics as an adult. As an attorney, he traveled around Georgia's Northern Circuit for 16 years with circuit judges for court sessions in log cabins and other makeshift sites throughout the state. His work helped him establish a broad network.

In 1819 he was commissioned by the state legislature to compile a digest of Georgia law. After two years of research and work, he produced A Digest of the Laws of the State of Georgia (1822). It quickly was put into use and is considered a classic, filled with notes, a list of repealed statutes and a valuable discussion of habeas corpus. A second and larger edition was published in 1837 after his death. His work was considered a landmark achievement. It was the "most important collection of Georgia laws until 1851," when Thomas R.R. Cobb published a new compilation.

In early 1823 Prince was one of five commissioners selected to lay out the town of Macon. He was elected to the State senate in 1824.

In 1828 he was elected by the state legislature to the U.S. Senate in a special election to fill the vacancy caused by the resignation of Thomas W. Cobb. He served from November 7, 1828, to March 3, 1829, as a Jacksonian Democrat, supporting the president in the Indian Removal Act of 1830. This authorized the government to remove the tribes especially from the Southeast to Indian Territory west of the Mississippi River. All the Five Civilized Tribes were affected in this removal, and they lost many members in the harsh conditions of their journeys.

== Later years ==
Prince later worked again as an editor. He presided over the first railroad convention in Georgia, and was one of the first stockholders and directors of the Georgia Railroad, critical to developing infrastructure in the state.

He abandoned the practice of law in 1832 and moved with his wife to Milledgeville, then the state capital. He purchased and became the editor of the Georgia Journal, an influential newspaper.

He sold the journal in 1835, retiring with his family at the age of 48 to a 450-acre (180 ha) farm he bought in Athens, Georgia. Their son Oliver, Jr. attended a preparatory school in Gwinnett County, Georgia.

Prince and his wife left in May 1837 for a trip to New York and Boston, where he worked with his publisher for some months preparing the second edition of his Law Digest for publication. They missed their children and were looking forward to their return. After sailing from New York on October 7, 1837, both Prince and his wife died in the wreck of the steam packet ship SS Home, which was caught in Racer's Storm, a destructive hurricane that hit both the Gulf and Atlantic coasts. Although the ship had been converted for ocean going, it carried only three lifeboats and two life preservers. It grounded near Ocracoke Inlet, North Carolina on October 8, 1837, and broke up the next day. The ship was 537 tons, 220 feet (67 m) long and 22 feet (6.7 m) wide. The remains of the estimated 90 victims, mostly women and children, were never recovered. Years later, the three Prince children erected a cenotaph in Rose Hill Cemetery in Macon in their parents' honor.

== Legacy and honors ==
- Prince's most famous sketch was published anonymously in The Monitor on June 6, 1807, but it was reprinted, translated into several foreign languages, and published in Augustus Baldwin Longstreet's Georgia Scenes (1835), which went through several editions in the 19th century. Most famously, the sketch of Captain Clodpole and his Georgia militia recruits is believed to have been plagiarized by the British author Thomas Hardy in his The Trumpet Major (1888), in a chapter on an English rural militia. Such charges were ignored and then denied by Hardy but critics think the similarities are too strong to be coincidence.
- In 1859 Prince Avenue, the section of the Federal Road west of downtown in Athens, Georgia, was named for him. It had led from town to his plantation. Later in the road's development, it was described as "once one of the nation's finest boulevards."

U.S. Senate
Preceded by Thomas W. Cobb	U.S. senator (Class 2) from Georgia; November 7, 1828 – March 3, 1829; Served alongside: John M. Berrien	Succeeded by George Troup
