= HMS Racer (1833) =

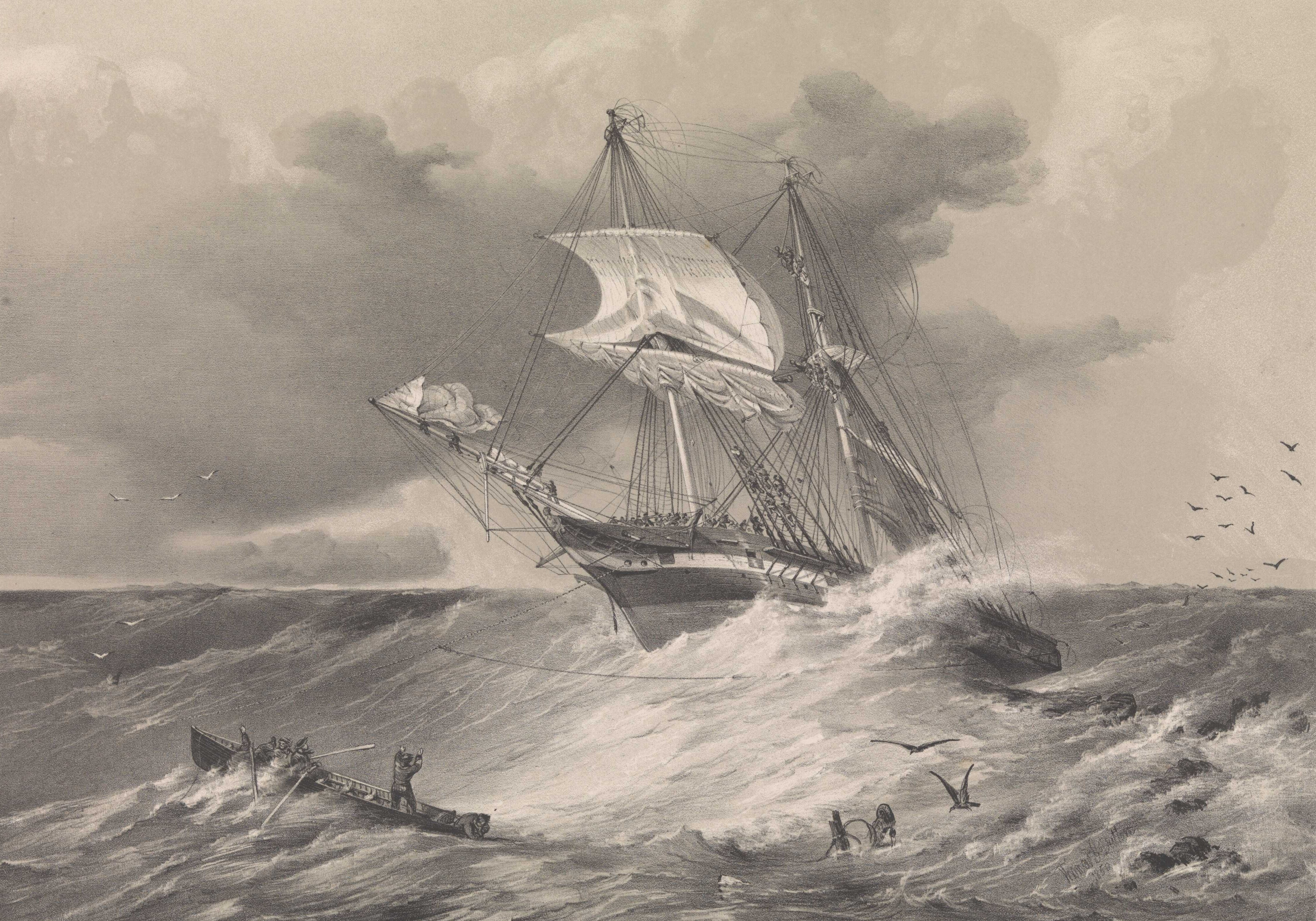
- Racer's sister ship HMS Sappho

History

United Kingdom
- Name: Racer
- Ordered: 10 July 1832
- Builder: Portsmouth Dockyard
- Laid down: September 1832
- Launched: 18 July 1833
- Completed: 5 September 1833
- Commissioned: 13 July 1833
- Out of service: 8 March 1852
- Fate: Sold 17 September 1852

General characteristics
- Class & type: Racer-class brig-sloop
- Tons burthen: 430 63/94 (bm)
- Length: 100 ft 8 in (30.7 m) (gundeck); 78 ft 9 1/8 in (24 m) (keel)
- Beam: 32 ft 4 3/4 in (9.9 m)
- Draught: 7 ft 10 in (2.4 m) (forwards); 12 ft 3 in (3.7 m) (aft)
- Depth of hold: 14 ft 10 1/2 in (4.5 m)
- Sail plan: Brig-sloop
- Complement: 110
- Armament: 2 × 12-pdr cannon; 14 × 32-pdr carronades

HMS Racer was a 16-gun Racer-class brig-sloop of the Royal Navy. Commissioned in 1833 she served on the North America and West Indies Station where she was badly damaged by what became known as Racer's hurricane in 1837. After repair at Havana she returned to England where she was paid off. Racer was recommissioned later in 1838 and returned to North America where, in 1840, her commanding officer was drowned in an accident. She was refitted in 1842 and served on the South America Station and on anti-slavery patrols off West Africa. An 1848 refit reduced her to 12 guns and she afterwards served as a tender to HMS Caledonia and in the Mediterranean Sea. Racer was sold out of service in 1852.

== Construction ==
Plan of Racer

Racer was the name ship of the Racer class of brig-sloops designed by Sir William Symonds in 1832. The class was a slightly modified version of the Snake-class brig-sloops; Racer was ordered on 10 July 1832. Her keel was laid at Portsmouth Dockyard in September and she was launched on 18 July 1833 having been commissioned on 13 July. Racer was completed on 5 September. Her construction cost £8,313, increasing to £12,152 including fitting out. Her Builder's Old Measurement was 430 63/94 . Racer measured 101 feet (31 m) in length and 32 feet 6 inches (9.91 m) in beam. She was classed as a 16-gun brig-sloop (a "Second Class" brig) and originally mounted 14x32 pounder carronades and 2x12 pounder cannons.

== Service ==
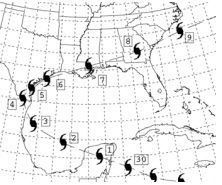
Track of Racer's hurricane

After commissioning Racer sailed under Commander James Hope for service on the North America and West Indies Station. Racer was at sea in the northwestern Caribbean on 28 September 1837 when she encountered what became known as Racer's hurricane. Racer endured winds of up to force 12 on that and the following day. She was dismasted and blown on her beam ends twice before re-righting, losing almost all rigging, navigational tools, and provisions in the process. A ship's boy died of injuries sustained on the lower deck, and two crewmen went missing. Racer afterwards put in to Havana, Cuba, for repairs.

Racer was paid off on 13 June 1838 but recommissioned on 19 September for service on the North America and West Indies Station under Commander George Byng. By 1840 she was commanded by Commander George Percy Hall; he drowned off Veracruz on 14 September 1840 when his boat was upset. Percy's replacement was Commander Thomas Harvey, who was given the command on 6 November. Racer was paid off again in October 1842, at Portsmouth. She received minor repairs and was refitted at the dockyard there between October 1842 and June 1843, at a cost of £6,920.

Racer was recommissioned on 28 April 1843 under the command of Commander Archibald Reed and served on the South America Station and then the West coast of Africa, where she captured the slave ship Bom Destino on 7 September 1844. She was paid off at Plymouth on 20 November 1847. Racer was refitted in 1848 as a 12-gun vessel. A surviving plan in the collection of the Royal Museums Greenwich shows her proposed bow and figurehead from this refit. The latter was a half-length bust of a male jockey.

Racer was recommissioned on 24 June 1848 under Lieutenant Henry Bacon and served as a tender to HMS Caledonia. From 28 February 1849 she was commanded by Commander Charles Henry Beddoes in the Mediterranean Sea. Racer was paid off for the final time on 8 March 1852 at Plymouth and was sold to Wilson & Company on 17 September 1852 for £820.
