= Mary Jane Morgan =

American art collector

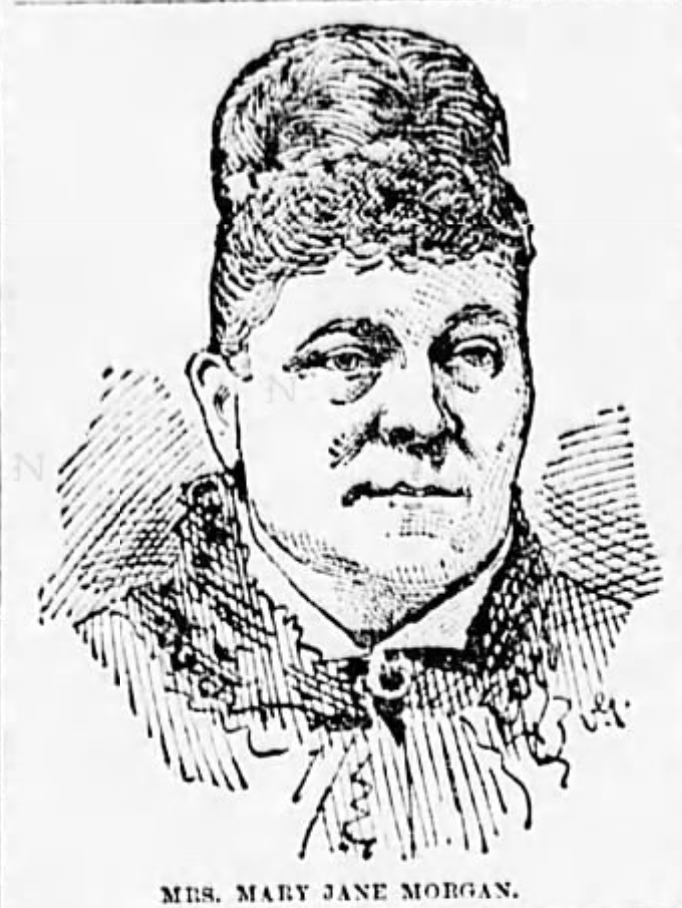
- Born: Mary Jane Sexton; 1823; New York City, New York
- Died: July 3, 1885 (aged 61–62); Saratoga Springs, New York
- Other names: Mary J. Morgan; Mary Jane Sexton Morgan
- Known for: Art collector
- Spouse: Charles Morgan

Mary Jane (Sexton) Morgan (1823–1885), initially a schoolteacher, became a fine art collector after her marriage to Charles Morgan. She was the second wife of the man who earned a fortune in the iron, railroad, and steamship industries. She also grew and collected orchids.

== Early life ==
Mary Jane Sexton, the daughter of Sarah Mills (Ross) Sexton and Francis Sexton, was born in 1823 in New York City. Her father, an East Indian trader, was from Wilbraham, Massachusetts, and began his career as an importer in Boston. Her maternal grandfather, William Ross, was the largest carriage maker in the state for a time. Upon his death, he left a large inheritance to his grandchildren.

Mary Jane, one of eight children, was educated at private schools in the city. At Mme. Hallet's school, only French was spoken. She finished her education at Dr. Schroeder's school and began teaching French and mathematics.

== Marriage ==
Mary Jane married Charles Morgan on June 25, 1851, becoming Mary Jane Morgan. (Note: The Texas State Historical Association states that they were married one day earlier, on June 24, 1851.) She was his second wife. Like her father, Charles was involved in the trade of goods from India. He was also a magnate in transportation industries; he owned the Louisiana and Texas Railroad and Steamship Company. He also owned the Morgan Iron Works. J. Pierpont Morgan was his cousin.

Charles had first married Emily Reeves; they had two sons — Charles and Henry — and three daughters. She died in 1850. After her death, the children attended Dr. Schroeder's School on Broadway in Manhattan. Charles met Mary Jane there and they were married. He built a fine house at 7 East 26th Street in New York City. She had step-grandchildren from her husband's first family. The two sons and one of the daughters died before their father.

== Art collector ==
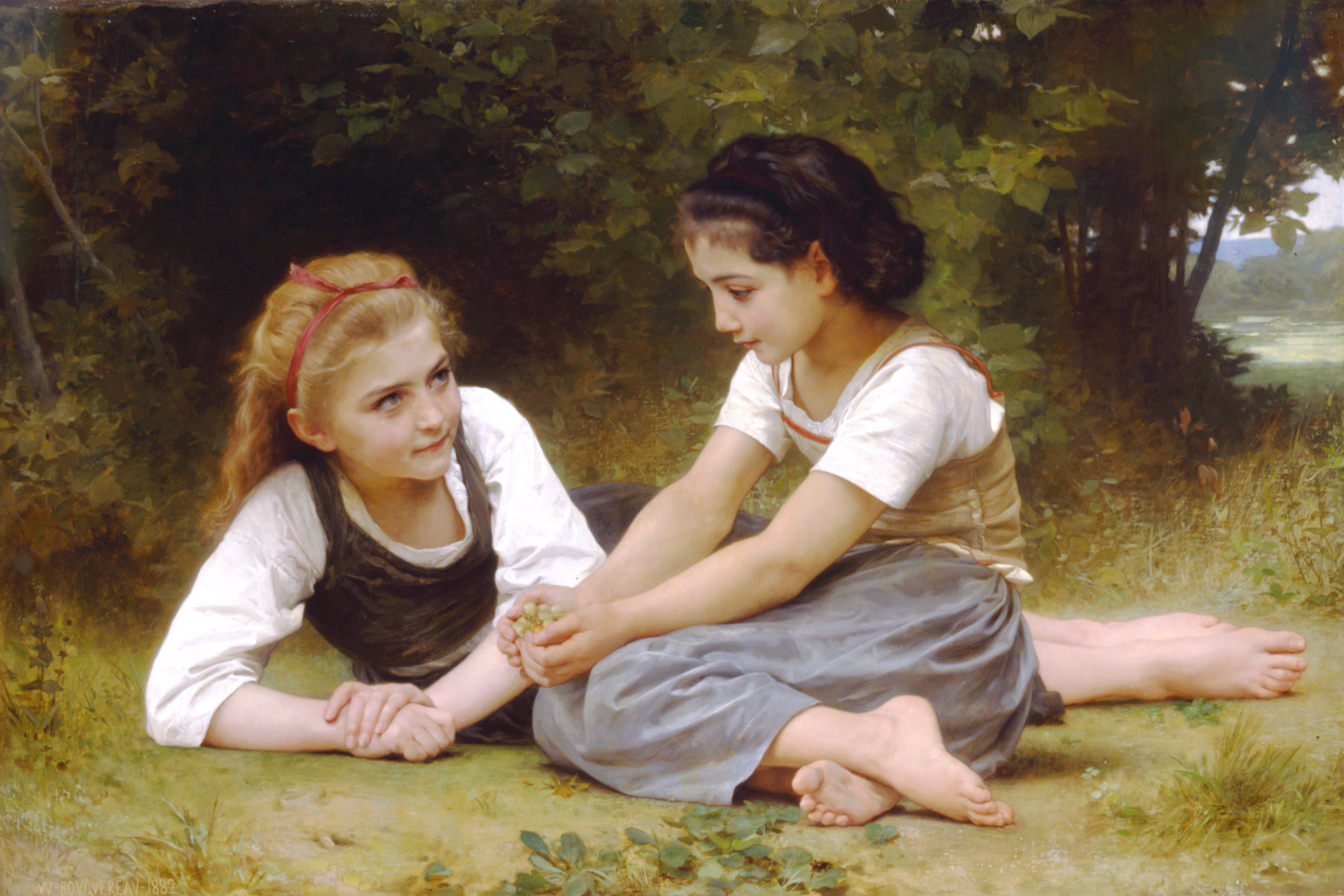
William-Adolphe Bouguereau, The Nut Gatherers, 1882, purchased in 1886 from Mary Jane Morgan's collection, now at the Detroit Institute of Art

Morgan collected fine art, like sculpture, etchings, and engravings. She collected the paintings by Eugène Delacroix, Jean-François Millet, Charles-François Daubigny, Jean-Baptiste-Camille Corot, and many others. She also collected Japanese and Chinese porcelain, carved ivory and wood, lacquers, ceramics, plates, and glasswork. The American Art Galleries held an auction at Chickering Hall of her $1.2 million (equivalent to $43,000,000 in 2025) collection in the first half of March 1886. Her total art collection, many of which were displayed on the walls of rooms, corridors, and stairways at her house at 7 East Twenty-Sixth Street on Madison Park in New York City, was estimated at $32 million (equivalent to $1.146666667×10^{9} in 2025). Works from her collection are among those of the National Gallery of Art in Washington, D.C., Metropolitan Museum of Art in New York City, Art Institute of Chicago, Museum of Fine Arts, Boston, and other museums and private collections.

== Death ==
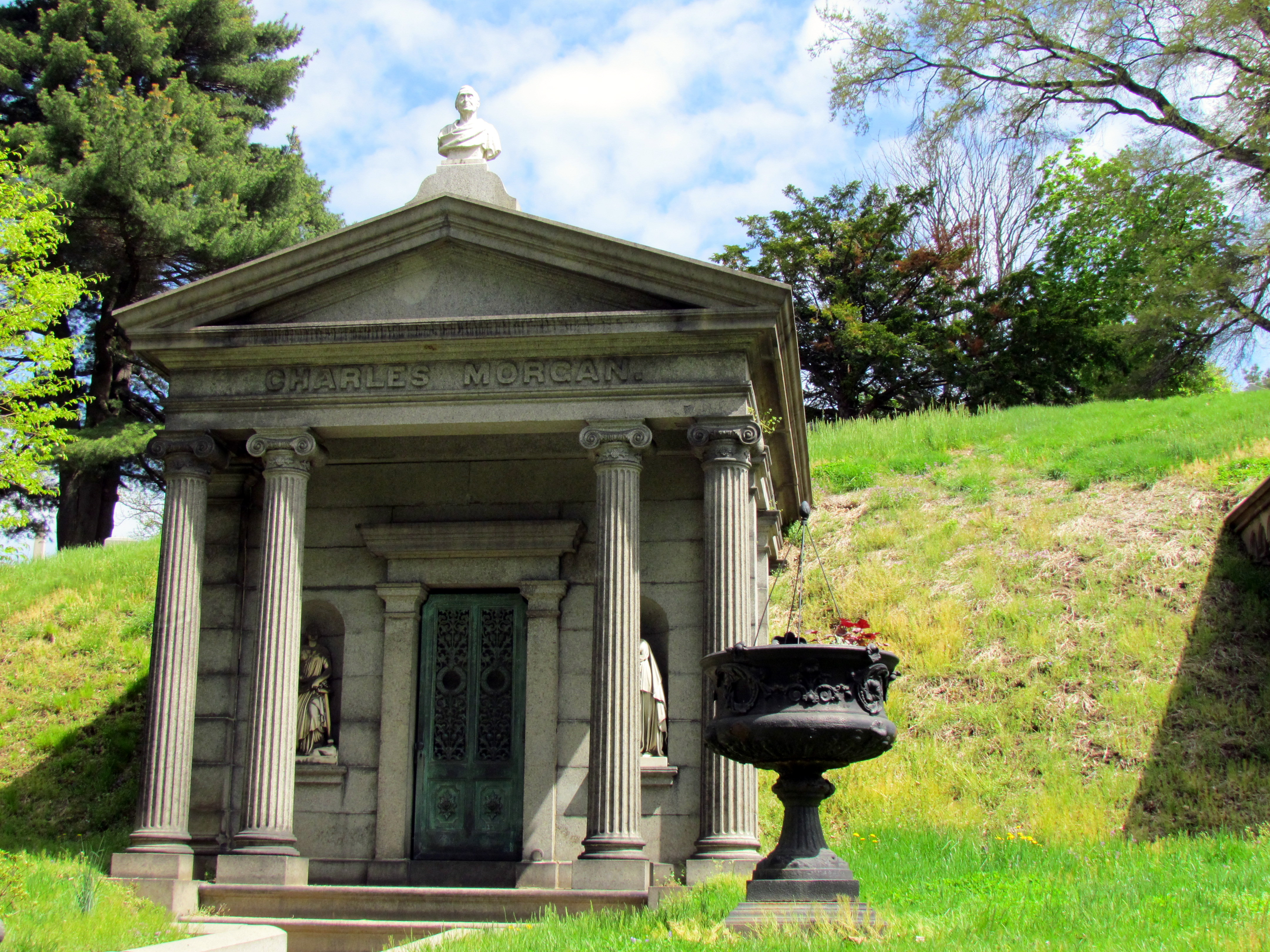
Tomb, Green-Wood Cemetery, Brooklyn, New York

Charles died on May 8, 1878. Morgan received a substantial share of his estate, which she used to purchase artwork and orchids. Not always clear-headed, she also gave a significant amount away to people who pressed her for money. Family members fought about the estate, too. Her health declined after her husband's death and she visited the Windsor Hotel in Saratoga Springs, New York, for her care.

Morgan died on July 3, 1885, at Saratoga Springs. She was buried at Green-Wood Cemetery, Brooklyn, New York. Charles and his first wife, Emily, are also buried at Green-Wood. All three are interred in section 81.
