= Charles Morgan (businessman) =

American railroad and shipping magnate

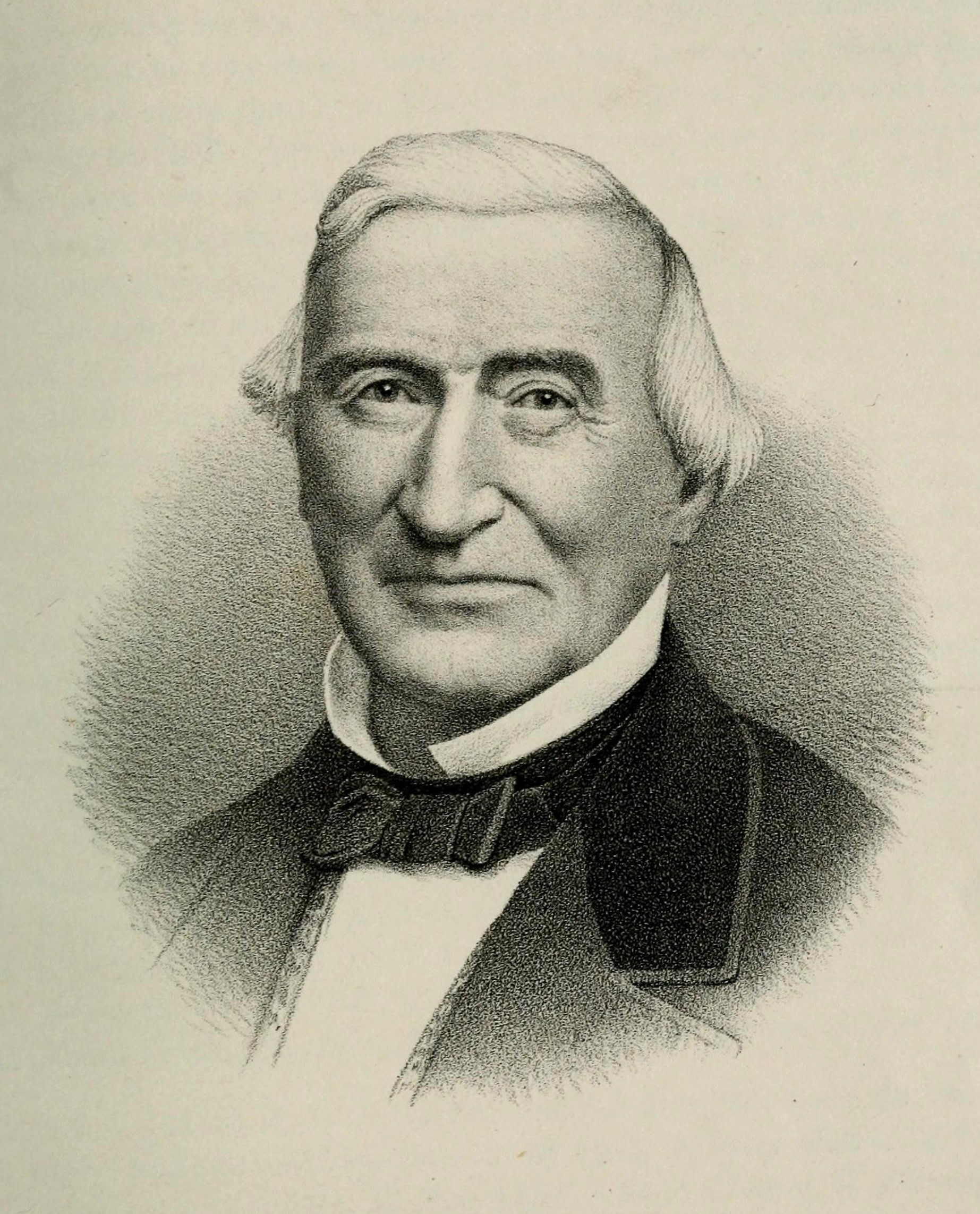
- Portrait by Nathaniel Harris Morgan in 1869
- Born: April 21, 1795; Clinton, Connecticut, U.S.
- Died: May 8, 1878 (aged 83); New York City, New York, U.S.
- Resting place: Green-Wood Cemetery, Brooklyn, New York
- Occupations: Merchant, entrepreneur (shipping), investor
- Known for: Morgan Line; Morgan Iron Works; Morgan's Louisiana and Texas Railroad
- Spouses: Emily Reeves (m. 1817; died 1850) Mary Jane Sexton (m. 1851)
- Children: 5

Charles Morgan (April 21, 1795 – May 8, 1878) was an American railroad and shipping magnate. He played a leading role in the development of transportation and commerce in the Southern United States through the mid- to late-19th century.

Morgan started working in New York City at the age of 14. He managed both wholesale and retail businesses before specializing in marine shipping. He invested in sailing vessels as early as 1819, while managing all aspects of the business from his office at the wharf in New York City. He started his first partnership for a packet company in 1831. During the 1830s, he held stakes in companies shipping to Kingston, Jamaica, and Charleston, South Carolina, from New York, and a stake in a company shipping between New Orleans and Galveston, Texas. During this time, he invested more in steamships than sailing ships. The Louisiana–Texas packets became so successful that he gradually withdrew from the Atlantic trade in the late 1830s.

In the 1840s and 1850s, Morgan expanded his shipping business in the Gulf of Mexico, expanding service to Mexico, Florida, and adding stops in Texas. Texas statehood and the Mexican War were boons to his enterprises of shipping mail, troops, and war material. By 1846, he sold his last stake in a sailing vessel. After 1849 and through part of the 1850s, Morgan responded to transportation demand to California driven by the gold rush. He offered passenger service from New York City to San Francisco via Panama. These activities pulled him into business alliances and rivalries with Cornelius Vanderbilt which culminated in Morgan's support of William Walker's filibuster in Nicaragua. Morgan also attempted to damage Vanderbilt's investments and his business positions before they agreed to a truce in 1858. In the late 1850s, a lucrative business developed out of a segment of railroad running between New Orleans and Berwick Bay, Louisiana. The railroad terminated in a desolate part of the state, and Morgan's steamers enabled the railroad to create revenue from an expensive infrastructure investment. In return, the railroad shortened Morgan's Louisiana to Texas route by about 150 miles. In 1855, Morgan incorporated his assets for the first time, co-founding the Southern Steamship Company. With family and other close friends managing the company, Morgan accelerated his investments in steamboats.

During the Civil War, he lost some of his investments to seizures by the North and the South. Most of the steamers seized were corporately owned by the Southern Steamship Company, which led to its liquidation in 1863. Morgan, however, prospered during the war despite these losses. He ran blockade runners for the Confederacy, but his most profitable venture during this period was the Morgan Iron Works. This shop built engines for thirteen ships sold to the Union Navy. At the end of the war, he repurchased some of these steamships at favorable prices.

During Reconstruction, Morgan sold his interest in the Morgan Iron Works. He also took advantage of the buyer's market for steamships and expanded his fleet. He resumed his Gulf packet service between New Orleans and Texas, and between New Orleans and Mobile, Alabama. In 1869, he acquired his first railroad. Two more railroad acquisitions followed in the 1870s. He died on May 8, 1878, at his home in New York City. Just prior to his death, he incorporated Morgan's Louisiana and Texas Railroad and Steamship Company and distributed his shares to several family members.

== Family life ==
Charles Morgan was born April 21, 1795, to George and Betsy Morgan. His native town was then known as Killingworth, Connecticut, but is now known as Clinton. Charles had a younger sister named Wealthy Ann (b. September 6, 1798) and older brothers, Elias (b. September 26, 1790) and John (b. December 3, 1791).

George Morgan was a successful farmer, and Charles had a comfortable upbringing in a rural area. However, a changing economy induced Charles to follow his brothers who had moved to New York City in 1809. He married Emily Reeves in 1817, several years after establishing himself as a merchant, and they had five children together: Emily Ann (1818), Frances Eliza (1823), Charles W. (1825), Henry R. (1827), and Maria Louise (1832). They remained married until Emily's death in 1850.

Morgan's daughter Frances Eliza married George W. Quintard in either 1843 or early in 1844. Like her father, Quintard grew up in Connecticut and left his hometown as a teenager seeking opportunity in New York City. Concurrent with his marriage, Quintard opened a shop, combining a grocery and ship chandlery. In 1847, he joined the marine engineering firm of T. F. Secor & Co., in which Charles Morgan was a partner, and in 1850, Quintard and Morgan purchased the firm outright and renamed it the Morgan Iron Works. Morgan's eldest daughter Emily Ann married Israel C. Harris of New Orleans. In December 1847, Harris founded a partnership with Charles Morgan's youngest son Henry, and the firm of Harris & Morgan assumed agency for all of Morgan's ships. In 1853, Maria Louise Morgan married Charles A. Whitney, a shipping agent. Out of Morgan's family, his sons-in-laws assumed the most active roles in his transportation businesses. His eldest son, Charles W., eschewed the shipping business and opened his own grocery in 1849. His youngest son, Henry Morgan, married Laura Mallard of New Orleans in 1854.

On June 24, 1851, Morgan married his second wife, Mary Jane Sexton, who taught math and French in New York. Charles and Mary Jane Morgan commissioned the construction of a large mansion at 7 East 26th Street, where they resided from 1852 until their deaths.

== Early career ==
Charles Morgan left home for New York City at age fourteen to work for a merchant, but he later started his own import business. His arrival in the city and coming of age coincided with the growing importance of New York as a port. He conducted business as both a grocer and a chandler, but his early business activities included importer and exporter, retailer and wholesaler, and shipping merchant.

Morgan owned stakes in eighteen sailing packet ships and fifteen sailing tramp vessels between 1819 and 1846. In addition to equity shares, he acted as ship's husband for seven vessels of The Ship Line, and for thirteen sailing vessels in which he had owned shares. His duties as husband included bookkeeping, dispatching, maintenance, and outfitter. In 1831, Morgan partnered with Benjamin Aymars to establish the first packet service from New York to Kingston, Jamaica. He also served as line master, who was responsible for coordination of all ships within the shipping line.

== Shipping companies ==
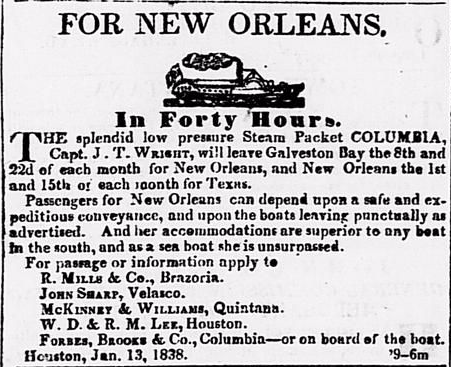
Advertisement for the Columbia, 1838

=== New York and Charleston Steam Packet Company ===
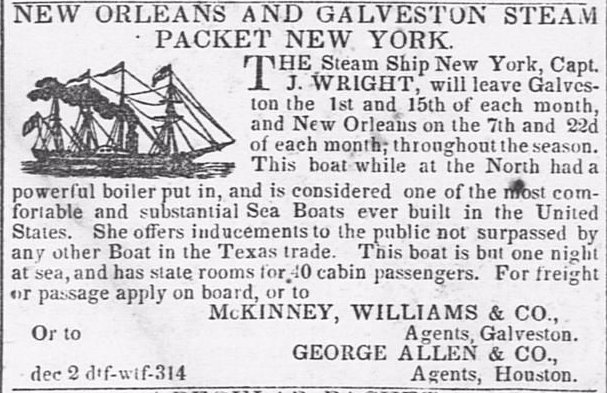
Advertisement for the New York, 1842

The New York and Charleston Steam Packet Company was formed in June 1834 by Charles Morgan, James P. Allaire, and John Haggerty. Allaire owned an iron foundry which counted Robert Fulton among its clients, and he acquired Fulton's shop after his death and combined it with his existing foundry. He had the side-wheeler David Brown built and dispatched it to run between New York and Charleston, South Carolina, in November 1833. The firm acquired the William Gibbons the same year, and by March 1, 1834, both steamers were making weekly runs.

At this time, sailing vessels still dominated ocean navigation, including the coastal trade, but Morgan and his brother-in-law John Haggerty joined with Allaire to develop coastal steam packets, focusing on the route between New York and Charleston. Morgan was the operations manager of the New York–Charleston line, as well as the Jamaica packet line. By June 1835, he was dispatching two steamers per week to Charleston, David Brown and the newly acquired Columbia. The packet company had won the bid for the United States Mail contract, worth $7,200 annually, and its ships were earning more than $1,000 per trip in profits.

However, the risks faced by ocean-going steamers threatened the company. William Gibbons sank in October 1836, which caused a loss of public confidence in addition to the direct financial loss. Some of the investors sold David Brown and then abandoned the company, leaving Morgan, Allaire, and Haggerty as the sole partners and Columbia as their only ship. Yet the partnership built new steamers of the line which they christened Home and New York, and they accomplished this despite the Panic of 1837. They also supplemented their packet revenue with contracts to carry mail along their line, and contracts to carry military troops to Florida.

Another lost ship threatened the New York and Charleston Steam Packet Company. Home started its last voyage—and only its third overall—on October 7, 1837. Home had cost nearly $90,000 to build and included a cabin with luxury amenities to accommodate as many as 120 first-class passengers. She ran aground while departing New York Harbor, but continued to the ocean without any apparent damage. However, a storm with rough seas battered the ship near Cape Hatteras, North Carolina; she started taking on water and her engine failed, and her sails were not able to drive and control the ship. The storm pushed Home toward the shore and ran it aground, and 99 people died trying to reach land.

=== Gulf coast packets ===
In 1837, Morgan started running steamboat service between New Orleans and Galveston, Texas, which was the first packet boat service running between these cities on a regular schedule. However, this had not been Morgan's first foray in shipping in the Gulf of Mexico. The previous year, the New York and Charleston Steam Packet Company deployed the steamship David Brown to sail a route from New Orleans to Key West, Florida, and Havana, Cuba. The Home catastrophe forced a reorganization of the partnership, with the new company shifting its emphasis to the Gulf trade, and Columbia sailed out of the port of New Orleans for Galveston on November 18, 1837, about five weeks after the Home wreck.

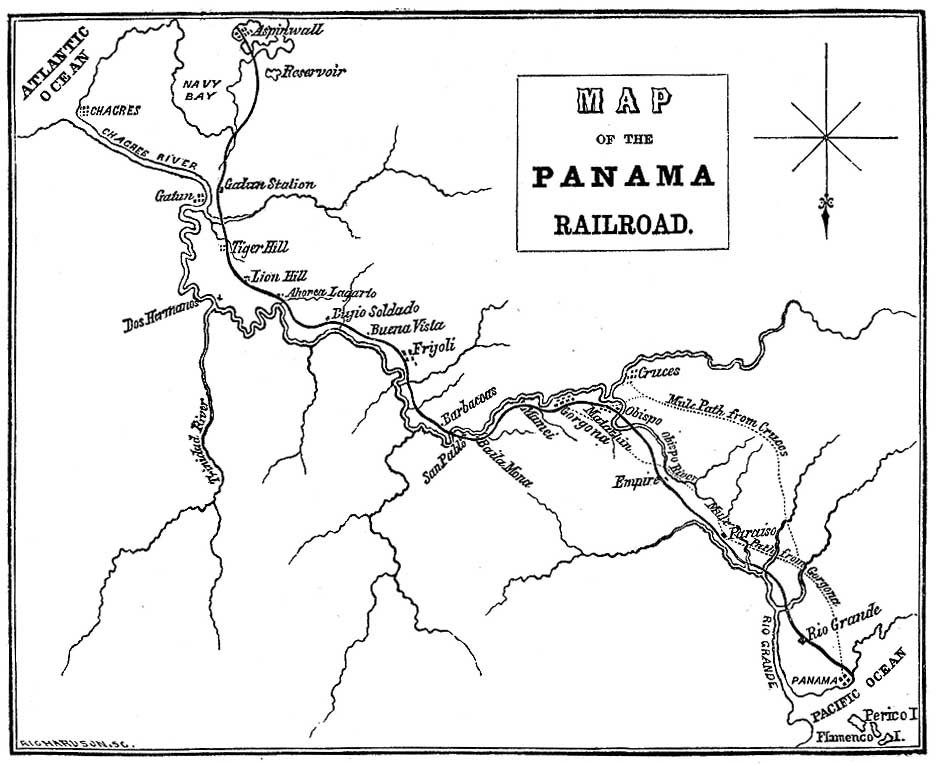
Map showing the course of the Chagres River (1861)

Allaire and several investors divested themselves from the New York and Charleston Steam Packet Company, leaving Morgan and John Haggerty as the sole partners: thus the Morgan Line was born and Columbia was its first ship, committed to the New Orleans–Galveston route. During this era, New Orleans was the main port for Gulf traffic, and the newly formed Republic of Texas attracted many immigrants and demand for trade goods. On June 8, 1838, the owners of Columbia and the owners of the steamship Cuba formed a cartel known as the New Orleans and Texas Line, which included coordination of rates and scheduling of shipping between New Orleans and Galveston. The New Orleans and Texas Line dominated transportation in the two cities after the last half of 1838.

Gulf trade experienced seasonal cycles. June marked the beginning of the slack season, which lasted throughout the summer and part of the fall, and business picked up again in early October. Morgan would remove some of his ships from service during slack times and send them to New York for refitting and repairs. He continued to maintain New York City as his residence and the main location for shipbuilding and repair, even though his main shipping market was located on the Gulf coast. He sold the last of his sailing vessels in 1846, while he increased his investment in T. F. Secor & Company, a builder of marine steam engines.

=== Mexican War ===
During the Mexican War, Morgan accepted various contracts to move U.S. troops, deploying New York and Galveston for military transport, and collecting nearly $80,000 (~$2.49 million in 2024) in less than six months in 1846. This compromised packet service, including its contract for carrying the U.S. mail. Morgan had won a contract to transport mail for the Republic of Texas, which he continued after Texas received statehood and the U.S. Mail Service took over in 1846.

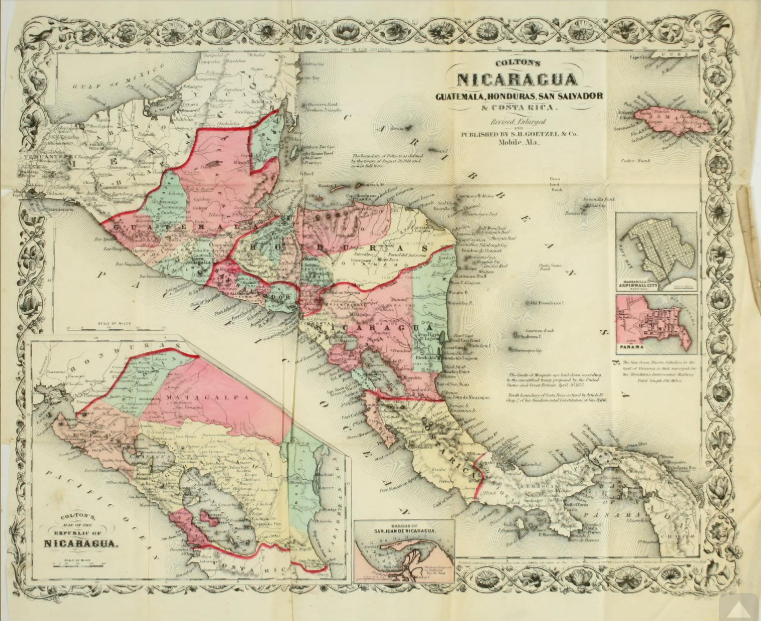
Pre-1860 map of Central America with inset of Nicaragua.

Morgan lost the New York in a hurricane in September 1846, and he required a larger steamship fleet to meet the demands of passenger service, civilian trade, mail service, and military transportation. He acquired five steamers in 1847, the first of which was the New Orleans, launched from New York on January 12, 1847. He paid $120,000 for the 869-ton steamship new, but it produced only $33,000 in revenue for moving troops. He sold it five months after its launch for $125,000. The other 1847 steamer purchases were for steamships already in use. Palmetto was built in 1846, and most of its interest sold to Morgan in March 1847. Captain Jeremiah Smith commanded the 533-ton steamer and spent about three months on charters for the United States Army. Afterward, Palmetto entered packet service for New Orleans and Galveston. Captain Smith maintained a small interest in Palmetto and became an investment partner with Morgan in the 249-ton steamship Yacht, a much smaller vessel better suited for navigating the sandbars of the Texas coast. Portland was a steamer built in 1835 which originally served the coast of Maine; she was brought into the Morgan fleet late in 1847 and assigned to move military troops and equipment out of New Orleans. The fifth and last acquisition in 1847 was Globe, which was placed immediately into packet service.

After the war, Morgan obtained the charter business for taking troops home. Later, he deployed his steamers to expanded packet service. Service in Texas expanded to Indianola, Port Lavaca, and Brazos St. Iago. The last of these ports facilitated outbound shipments of precious metals, hides, and wool. Starting in 1850, the Morgan earned $15,000 annually for carrying mail in and out of Brazos St. Iago, and $12,000 for the mail route from New Orleans to Galveston and Indianola.

=== Gold rush ===
==== Panama ====
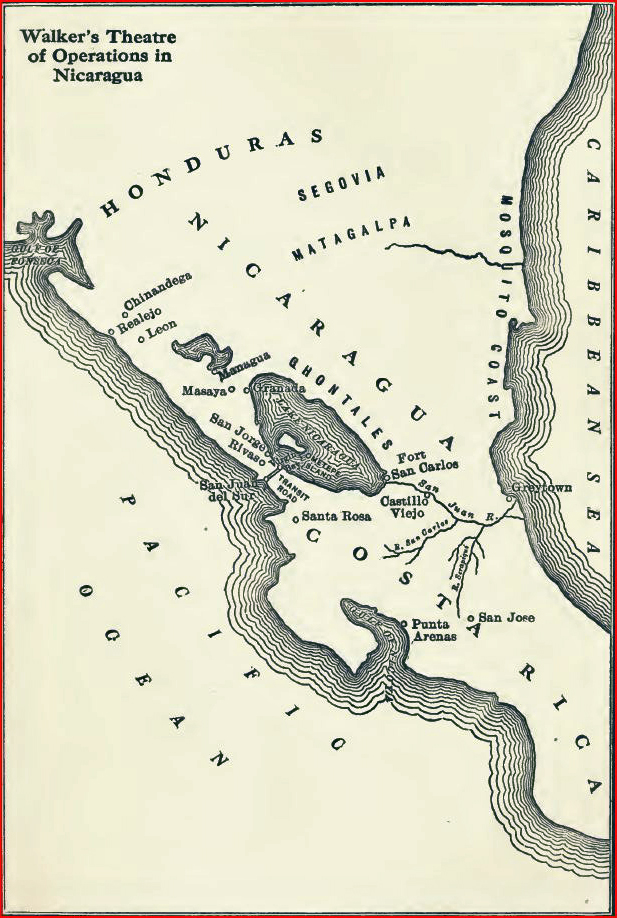
William Walker's map of Nicaragua

After the discovery of gold in California in January 1848, news emanated to the eastern United States in the last quarter of that year. With financial capital and the means of production still concentrated near the Eastern seaboard, there was demand for transportation to carry people and supplies to the Pacific coast. In January 1849, no fewer than 90 marine vessels departed eastern ports bound for California. Through mid-April 1849, the port of New York dispatched 226 California-bound vessels carrying a total of about 20,000 people.

The shortest wholly oceanic route from New York was over 14,000 nautical miles, and even a few hundred miles longer from New Orleans. Yet this distance from New York could be reduced to less than 5,000 miles with a multi-modal short-cut across the Isthmus of Panama. The Royal Steam Packet Company, one of three companies operating across Central American just prior to the gold rush, ran a route from London to Panama, then overland to the Pacific. Two companies, the U.S. Mail Steamship Company and the Pacific Mail Steamship Company, serviced US government contracts using a similar transport corridor. The heightened transportation demand made these enterprises highly lucrative in 1849. At the same time, demand outstripped supply in early 1849, especially on the Atlantic side, and Charles Morgan first entered this market as a major shareholder of Crescent City, which his agent J. Howard & Son dispatched to Chagres, Panama, from New York. Morgan acquired the newly built Empire City, adding to the Panama service, with the two ships forming the Empire City Line. Morgan and John T. Howard increased their investment in westbound transportation throughout 1849 and 1850, first buying the screw-steamer Sarah Sands, then four more ships of the line, three of which sailed the Pacific side from Panama to San Francisco.

A business collaboration between Morgan and Cornelius Vanderbilt was spurred by a disabled ship. By accident, the two men departed New York on Morgan's Crescent City on December 14, 1849. Both were travelling in order to investigate the transportation business in Central America. A failing engine caused the steamer to limp into Charleston for repairs. Each man improvised transportation toward the Gulf of Mexico. Vanderbilt chartered a ship for Havana and carried with him eight other passengers after observing that Morgan chartered a ship for himself and several other passengers, sealing the deal by buying the ship's cargo of lumber.

==== Nicaragua ====
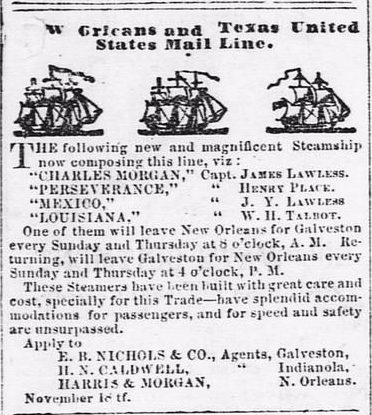
Advertisement from the Weekly Telegraph (Houston), February 27, 1856.

Morgan and Howard operated three steamers from the Pacific side of Panama in 1850, compared to four operated by U.S. Mail Steamship Company. Pacific Mail Steamship Company added four ships to its Pacific fleet for a total of seven, creating a competitive market for passengers in 1850. Morgan withdrew from the competition for the trade across Panama late in 1850, though he did not withdraw from the trade across the isthmus. Seeking to shorten the trip from New York to the west coast, he probed crossings several hundred miles west through a water and land route via Nicaragua. This led initially to a business alliance between Morgan and Vanderbilt, who had previously secured comprehensive right-of-way charters with the Nicaraguan government. On August 27, 1849, American Atlantic and Pacific Ship-Canal Company gained a concession for exclusive rights to construct a canal to the Pacific. In exchange for this and additional concessions, Nicaragua received cash, a right to stock in the canal, and annual cash payments. Under a separate deal, Vanderbilt also gained the right-of-way through Nicaragua using any means of transportation, which would remain in effect even if his company did not complete the canal. However, this second deal was signed after a civil war split Nicaragua into rival governments. The agreement was negotiated between Joseph L. White and the conservative faction which ruled out of the city of Granada, and conveyed the rights to construct a canal to the Vanderbilt-controlled Accessory Transit Company. The parties signed on August 14, 1851.

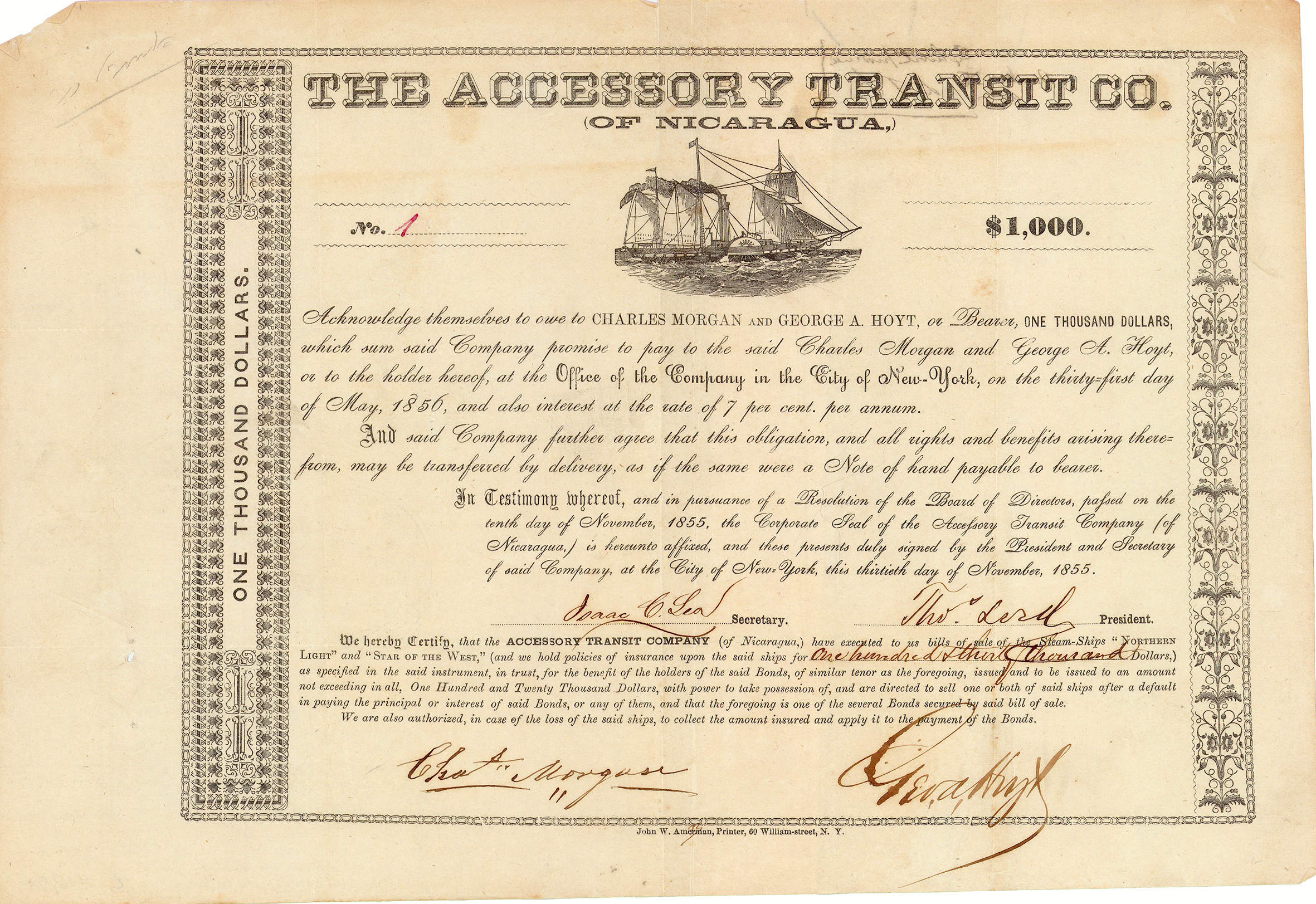
Bond of the Accessory Transit Company (of Nicaragua), issued 30. November 1855, signed by Charles Morgan

Vanderbilt began operating routes from New York to San Francisco on his New and Independent Line. Morgan placed his own ships into service of Vanderbilt's company, running his Empire City Line steamers from New York, as well as Mexico from New Orleans, all of which put in at the port of San Juan del Norte. In September 1852, Vanderbilt resigned as president of the company and divested most of his interests the following December. He retained a commission as the company's agent and a percentage of the company's business across Nicaragua. Morgan was part of a short-lived alliance with Vanderbilt as late as February 1853. Accessory Transit Company reported net revenue in excess of $535,000 (~$15.9 million in 2024) in its semi-annual report at the end of 1853; however, this report failed to account for stock dilution, accounts payable to the government of Nicaragua, and the debt settlements to Vanderbilt. In the same year, Morgan deposed Vanderbilt as the agent of the line while the Commodore was vacationing. An anti-Vanderbilt faction seized the control of the board, and they appointed Morgan president of the Accessory Transit Company.

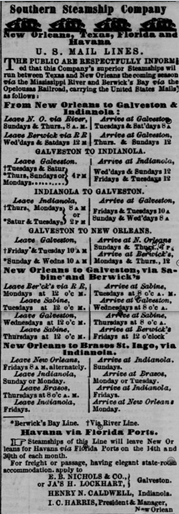
Advertisement for Southern Steamship Company, 1860.

The New York Times reported decades later in its obituary of Vanderbilt that he penned the following missive directed at his enemies, "You have undertaken to cheat me. I won’t sue you for the law is too slow. I’ll ruin you." According to two historians, this is at best apocryphal. In the fall of 1853, Vanderbilt entered the Atlantic–Pacific trade to compete with his former partners. He formed the Independent Opposition Line with North Star sailing the New York–Nicaragua leg, and partnered with Edward Mills and his two steamers to run on the Nicaragua–San Francisco leg. The Independent Opposition Line offered aggressively priced fares, triggering a three-way price war between Vanderbilt, Morgan's Accessory Transit Company, and the U.S. Pacific Mail Lines. Vanderbilt's low fares damaged his competitors. After less than a year, the Morgan-led Accessory Transit Company and the U.S. Pacific Mail Lines agreed to pay over $1 million to Vanderbilt, in return for Vanderbilt leaving the market. This payment included a total of $800,000 for his two ships on the Pacific side and $40,000 per month in cash for a non-compete agreement. With Vanderbilt out of the field, the remaining carriers were able to restore their rates.

Morgan and C. K. Garrison participated in a scheme devised by Edmund Randolph to support the filibuster of William Walker in Nicaragua. Randolph and Walker were old friends. Walker readily accepted Randolph's plan to invalidate the old transit concessions to Accessory Transit Company so that the new transit concession would eventually convey to a new company headed by Garrison and Morgan. They divested of their Accessory Transit Company stock, while Morgan even took short positions. Patricio Rivas of the Liberal-faction assumed the title of Provisional President of Nicaragua, under the supervision of Walker. Vanderbilt and two other investors accumulated enough Accessory Transit Company stock to gain a majority of its shares, recapturing control of the company and causing losses on Morgan's short positions. With Vanderbilt back in control as an investor, Morgan resigned his directorship on December 21, 1855. Yet Morgan responded to this financial and professional loss by doubling down. In the first part of 1856, Morgan went on another short selling binge, matched each time by Vanderbilt and his allies. Morgan failed in weakening the price of Vanderbilt's stock and suffered great financial losses on the process. By 1858, Morgan withdrew from running steamers on the Pacific and from transit in Nicaragua. At the same time, Vanderbilt sold his fleet of Gulf packets to Morgan, ending the feud between Morgan and the Commodore.

=== Southern Steamship Company ===
Morgan incorporated the Southern Steamship Company on March 14, 1855. Chartered in Louisiana, it opened some of his Gulf shipping interests to outside investors. Morgan was a minority shareholder, controlling only 500 of 4,000 shares. However, two of the members of the board were Morgan's New Orleans agents, Israel Harris (his son-in-law) and Henry R. Morgan (his son). Their partnership, Harris & Morgan, was also the largest shareholder, controlling 890 of 4,000 shares, so the triumvirate of Charles Morgan, Henry Morgan, and Israel Harris controlled 1,390 of 4,000 shares. A third board member, Cornelius B. Payne, was a junior partner of Harris & Morgan and owned 250 shares of stock in the Southern Steamship Company. The fourth board member was a close friend of Charles Morgan, a New Orleans grocer, E.J. Hart. Morgan completed his requirements to capitalize the corporation at $400,000 (~$10.9 million in 2024) by transferring several assets on June 10, 1856. The assets received by the Southern Steamship Company were four steamships, the New Orleans–Galveston–Indianola mail contract, eight enslaved persons, and sundry equipment. Through incorporation, Morgan attracted new investors while still maintaining a large portfolio of assets apart from the Southern Steamship Company. Incorporation also represented a partial withdrawal from management of Morgan's interests and a new role as a passive investor.

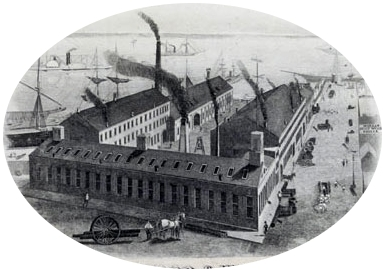
Morgan Iron Works

On October 1, 1856, the Southern Steamship Company secured a mail contract serving Brashear, Louisiana and Galveston. Brashear was located at the western terminus of the New Orleans, Opelousas and Great Western Railroad (NOO&GW), navigable from Berwick's Bay on the Gulf of Mexico. The NOO&GW was planned to span from New Orleans to the Pacific Coast, but higher than expected construction costs prevented the company from building beyond this swampy, inaccessible, and sparsely populated area of Louisiana. After fending off a serious challenge from Cornelius Vanderbilt, the Southern Steamship Company forged a mutual freight agreement with the NOO&GW. The eastern terminal of the NOO&GW was located in Algiers, Louisiana, directly across the Mississippi River from New Orleans. Freight delivered to the railroad at Algiers avoided New Orleans taxes and wharfage fees. In addition, transferring western-bound freight to the railroad eliminated both navigating the Mississippi River and shortened the western route to Galveston by about 160 miles (260 kilometres).

Morgan himself had negotiated the complex freight deal between the Southern Steamship Company and NOO&GW. Southern Steamship agreed to transport freight for the railroad from its Brashear terminal to Galveston (via Sabine Pass, Texas), and to Indianola, Texas (via Galveston). The Southern Steamship Company received a percentage of NOO&GW's freight receipts based on a multiple-tiered formula. NOO&GW also agreed to move freight for the Southern Steamship Company at a discount, and provide its ships with a wharf at Brashear. The steamship service not only carried mail and other freight, but carried over 16,000 passengers from Brashear to Texas in 1859, and over 28,000 passengers in 1860.

== American Civil War ==
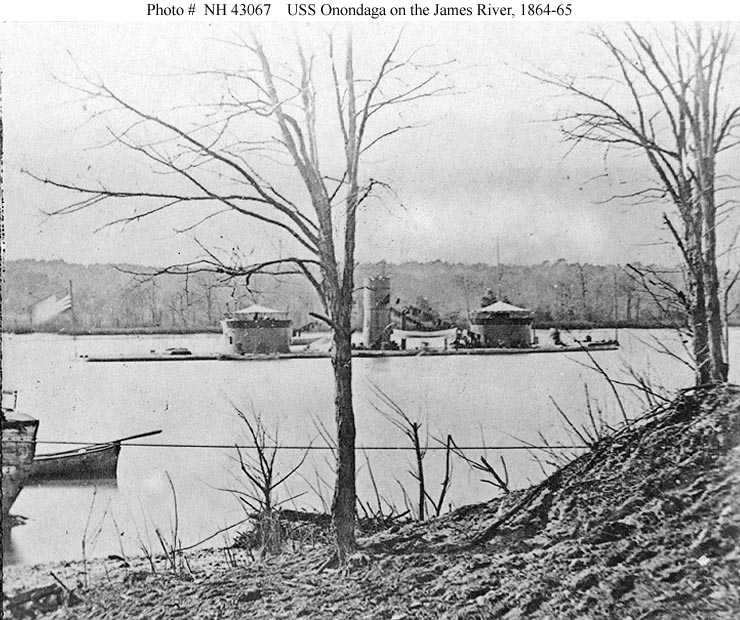
USS Onondaga in the James River

Morgan was a lifetime resident of the northeast. He grew up in Connecticut and maintained a primary residence in New York City his entire adult life. However, he was "a more-than-casual slaveholder," acquiring no fewer than thirty-three enslaved persons through the start of the American Civil War. In a very early action of the Civil War, one of Morgan's steamships, the General Rusk, transported Texas troops. The State of Texas adopted its ordinance of secession on February 4, 1861, and appointed E.B. Nichols as its Commissioner and Financial Representative on February 7. Nichols had already been serving Morgan as his shipping agent in Galveston. He booked Morgan's General Rusk to transport troops for $500 per day. Shortly after, this Texas force captured the United States Army Base at Brazos St. Iago. Yet, Morgan used the same steamer to transport the fleeing Union troops from Brazos St. Iago to Key West, Florida.

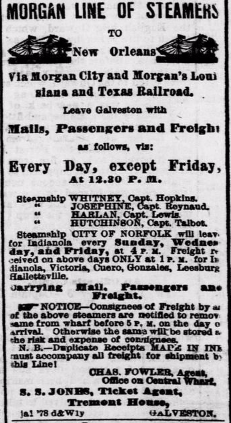
Advertisement for Morgan Line, May 11, 1878

Morgan kept his fleet in the Gulf ports, even after the attack on Fort Sumter. Louisiana Governor Thomas O. Moore mandated a seizure of three ships from the Southern Steamship Company, viewing Charles Morgan as a northerner and a threat to the Confederacy. While Morgan never sided with the Confederacy, Israel Harris did. The ships were allowed to travel on a limited basis, but with many inspections at the ports of New Orleans and Galveston. At Galveston, the ranking officer, Sidney Sherman, seized two of Morgan's vessels. Nichols interceded on Morgan's behalf, and Sherman agreed to allow the Morgan steamers passage off Texas waters. However, he did keep the General Rusk for the Confederate fleet. With the United States mail service discontinued and the effective Union blockade of southern ports, Morgan's steamship empire was idled. The Southern Steamship Company, which had entered the Civil War with twelve steamships, sold two of them, and lost the other ten when General Mansfield Lovell expropriated them on behalf of the Confederacy on January 16, 1862. The company was left without a fleet and without compensation for its seized assets, thus it folded in 1863.

Despite the losses borne by the Southern Steamship Company, Morgan continued to operate other ventures by doing business with both the Union and the Confederacy. Morgan placed orders with Harlan and Hollingsworth for five large steamers between 1862 and 1864. These ships were frequently booked on charters for the Union during the war. Morgan also profited from his ownership of the Morgan Iron Works, which was producing engines from its shops in New York City for commercial enterprises in the United States and abroad. Beyond civilian production, the Morgan Iron Works built engines and other marine equipment for thirteen ships in the Union Naval fleet. In one case, they built a warship from scratch: USS Onondaga. These naval contracts accrued over $2 million in revenue to the Morgan Iron Works. For the Confederates, Morgan ran the Frances to evade Union blockades between Havana and the southern ports.

== Reconstruction ==
=== Sale of Morgan Iron Works ===
After the Civil War, demand for steamships flagged and the federal government placed some of their vessels on the market. Morgan had already anticipated the buyer's' market for steamships as early as the fall of 1865. In 1867, Quintard and Morgan sold their interests in the Morgan Iron Works to John Roach for $450,000 (~$8.28 million in 2024). Morgan bought four steamers from the U.S. Navy. Morgan had sold two of these to the Navy during the war: Austin and William G. Hewes. In another case of making money on both ends, Morgan sold three steamships to the federal government for $495,000, then repurchased them a year later for $225,000. Included in this expansion of his fleet, he ordered eight new ships from Harlan and Hollingsworth between 1865 and 1867.

Quintard proposed a new investment idea to Morgan in 1867. This resulted in the formation of the New York and Charleston Steamship Company (not to be confused with the New York and Charleston Packet Company). The new company started by acquiring Manhattan from Morgan's youngest son-in-law, Charles A. Whitney. Next they purchased two large steamers, Champion (1,452 tons) and Charleston (1,517), and chartered the steamer James Adger.

Morgan forged a rate deal with the Pontchartrain Railroad on April 17, 1866. He received 75 percent of the revenue for their freight traveling on his steamships between New Orleans and Mobile, Alabama. At first, Morgan faced open competition from other carriers on the route, but in 1868, he paid $250,000 (~$4.89 million in 2024) in exchange for being the exclusive carrier. However, after 1870, Morgan competed for business with a railroad running between the two cities.

On May 3, 1866, Morgan signed a new contract with the NOO&GW railroad. This deal contained many of the provisions of the eight-year contract they implemented before the war. Morgan received a percentage of the freight receipts based on multiple-tiers, received a fifty percent discount moving his supplies on the railroad, and the railroad would provide wharfage at the western terminus at Brashear. As before, Morgan's steamship transported freight from the western terminus of the railroad at Brashear to the Texas ports of Galveston and Indianola.

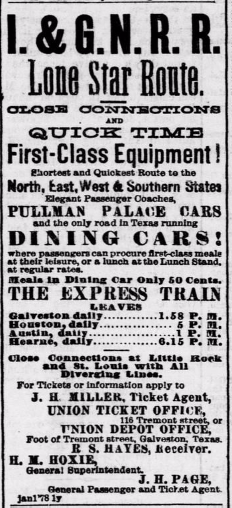
Advertisement for International & Great Northern Railroad, May 11, 1878

In the late-1860s, Morgan's steamships carried much of the eastbound freight for a growing coastal Texas cattle industry. He offered new service in 1867 to Rockport, Texas, hauling outbound hides and beef products. The new port on Aransas Bay exported over 2 million pounds of hides and over 1.7 million pounds of wool by 1869. The port of Indianola served the area around Matagorda Bay, where five meatpacking facilities were located by 1870. Indianola exported cattle, hides, wool, cotton, and processed meat.

There was a major managerial re-alignment in 1867. Preceded by the departure of George Quintard and Henry Morgan, both of whom pursued new paths as independent financiers, his agent in New Orleans, Israel C. Harris, retired on April 1 before dying on Christmas Eve. Morgan hired a new agency for the Crescent City, headed by another one of his son-in-laws, Charles A. Whitney. Whitney & Company's other partner was another Morgan associate by the name of Alexander C. Hutchinson. Morgan granted them total authority over the Morgan Line, which operated between Louisiana and Texas.

=== Railroad ownership ===
To this point, Morgan had invested in the first-tier mortgage bonds of the New Orleans, Opelousas & Great Western Railroad (NOO&GW), but had not yet held equity in any railroads. The NOO&GW had fallen behind in its coupon payments. The Illinois Central Railroad, a large bondholder, filed suit on June 10, 1868. The following year, William S. Pike approached Morgan to join a group of 26 NOO&GW bondholders to force a court-ordered sale of the railroad. Morgan refused to join the suit, and Pike dropped the plan. Several months later, in September 1868, Morgan offered a complex counter-proposal to act as an operator and lessee of the NOO&GW. Morgan agreed to buy all of the NOO&GW's debt, while taking responsibility for two-thirds of the debt for building the railroad to Sabine Pass, Texas. In Pike's opinion, the bondholders would be offering as much as a fifty percent discount on their assets, thus he declined the offer. Morgan predicted a bankruptcy in the NOO&GW's near future. Shortly later, Morgan retained Miles Taylor as legal counsel, who filed a series of legal actions against the railroad. One of these suits competed against an earlier lawsuit filed in federal court by the Illinois Central Railroad, which was attempting to force the NOO&GW into liquidation. This was inimical to Morgan's financial interests since he was a major bondholder, and Taylor's suit asked for a court-ordered sale of the railroad. The Illinois Central's suit was dismissed in Federal District Court, and Morgan won his suit, sending the NOO&GW into an auction at the New Orleans Custom House. Through an agent, Morgan purchased the NOO&GW on May 25, 1869, for $2,050,000 (~$42.8 million in 2024).

Morgan, for his more than $2 million, owned the entire NOO&GW. He renamed it Morgan's Louisiana and Texas Railroad. At the time of purchase, the assets included a terminal each at Algiers and Brashear, and eighty miles of single-track in between. The Algiers terminal included forty acres with 370-feet of frontage on the Mississippi River, directly across from New Orleans. It was highly modernized for its time, incorporating innovative cargo-handling equipment such as Link Belt steel conveyor belt "Endless Freight Conveyors". The Brashear terminal included coal yards, warehouses, and wharves, with 330-feet of frontage on the Atchafalaya River. Along its track, the NOO&GW had built many miles of trestles over the watery right-of-way, and also maintained depots and rolling stock.

Morgan purchased a large share of equity of the San Antonio and Mexican Gulf Railroad (SA&MG) on May 25, 1870. His steamers had long served the Texas port of Indianola, and he met the competition of railroad transport to Indianola by his own railroad investment. Morgan, and the other owner, Henry S. McComb, renamed the company the Gulf, Western Texas, and Pacific Railroad. Morgan acquired McComb's interest in the railroad in May 1872.

With steamboat service from New Orleans to Mobile, Alabama, discontinued, the Louisiana–Texas service accounted for most of Morgan's marine business. High taxes and fees increased the costs for doing business in New Orleans. The city's access to the Mississippi River was less important in light of Morgan's Texas and Louisiana Railroad. After the dredging of the Atchafalya River in 1872, Morgan moved all of his Louisiana steamboat operations from New Orleans to Brashear, relying on the ferry from New Orleans to Algiers, and his railroad from Algiers to Brashear to convey his westbound passengers and freight. He also shifted investments from wharfage at Lake Ponchartain and in New Orleans to expanded facilities in Brashear. By around 1875, Morgan's payroll included about 800 workers in Brashear, with the wharf spanning over 2,600 feet. In February 1876, the town's name was changed to Morgan City.

By the 1870s, the Southern Steamship Company had expanded its geographical reach through new assets and alliances. For example, a Morgan agent in 1873 was able to sell a single ticket for passage between New Orleans and San Antonio, Texas, which employed several modes of transportation. Starting on rail from Algiers, Louisiana, the journey included coastal steamboat passage combining two packets, another rail segment, and finally the passenger reached San Antonio via stagecoach.

Meanwhile, in Texas, Morgan started withdrawing from Galveston as a port. The Galveston Wharf Company no longer gave his ships favored treatment. In addition, the only railroad from that city—the Galveston, Houston and Henderson—could not run any of its rolling stock north of Houston. Morgan also adapted to the progress of the railroad networks. First, in 1873, he changed his freight tariffs from rates by container volumes to rates per hundred pounds of weight. Second, he had started a plan to bypass Galveston as a logistics center in favor of Houston. Around the same time, he also forwarded his passengers and freight through the Houston Direct Navigation Company, which transferred between coastal steamers to Buffalo Bayou packets in Galveston Bay, thus avoiding the port of Galveston, along with its regulations and fees. Houston Direct Navigation Company ran its steamers from Galveston Bay to the wharf at Houston. Later he bought enough stock in the company to become its largest shareholder, further aligning his interests with Houston and against Galveston.

On July 1, 1874, Morgan forged an agreement with the Ship Channel Company (Houston) to improve navigation of Buffalo Bayou. Morgan agreed to dredge to a depth of nine feet and at least 120-feet in width in exchange for company stock. Less than two years later, he completed a channel through Galveston Bay to an existing channel through the Red Fish Bar, and the final segment terminated about six miles east of Houston, at a place he named Clinton, Texas. He next commissioned the construction of a short line railroad of just over seven miles to network his wharves at Clinton with two Houston railroads: the Houston and Texas Central and the International and Great Northern. When this line started operation on September 11, 1876, Morgan gained access to most of Texas and no longer needed Galveston within his transportation network. Next, he engineered a takeover of the Houston and Texas Central, ousting the all-Texas management, and installing himself as a director with Charles A. Whitney as president.

== Death and legacy ==
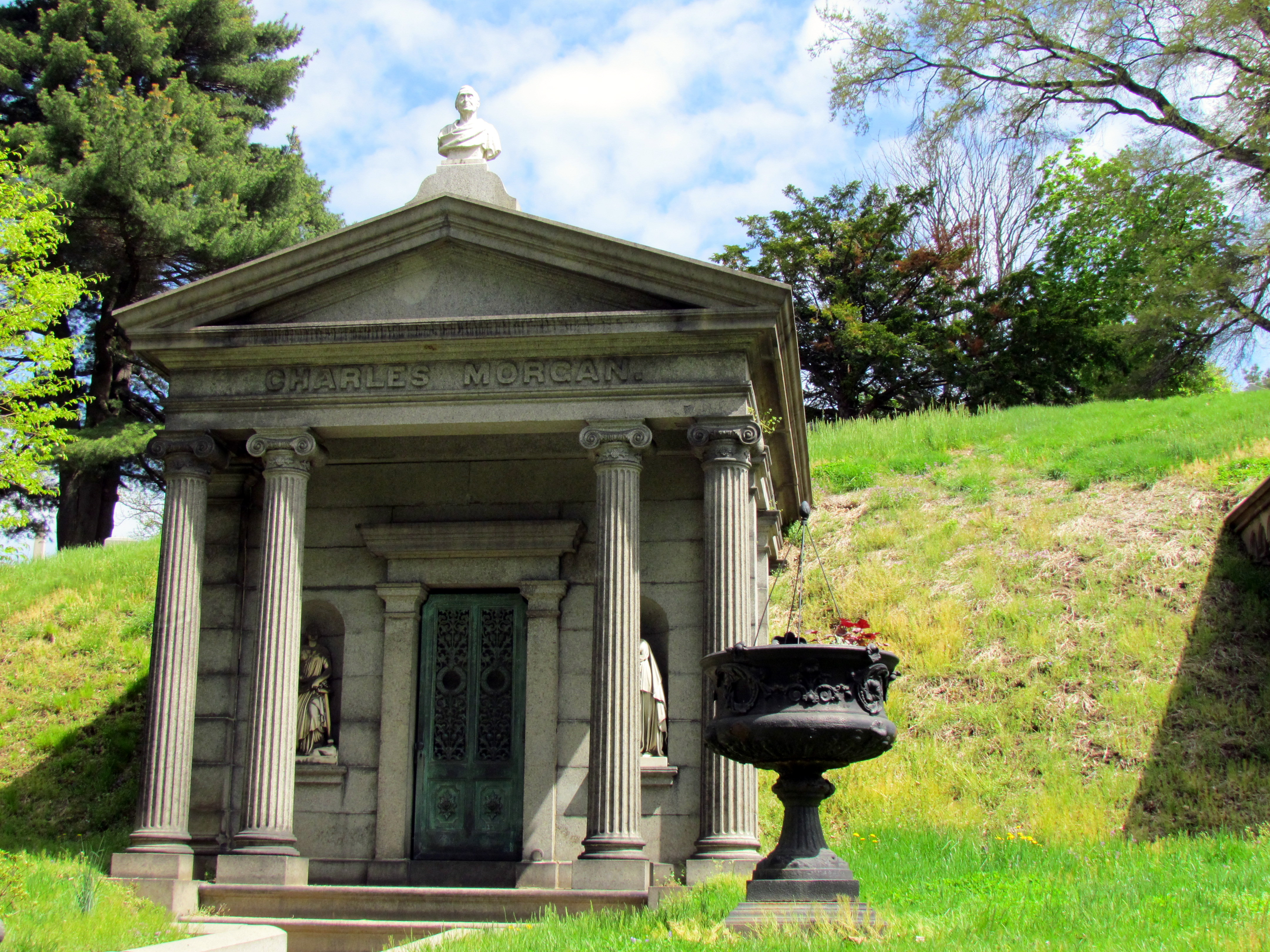
Tomb, Green-Wood Cemetery, Brooklyn

Morgan died on May 9, 1878, at his home in New York City after an extended illness as a consequence of Bright's disease. He is interred at Green-Wood Cemetery in Brooklyn, New York.

Morgan's incorporation of the eponymous Morgan's Louisiana and Texas Railroad and Steamship Company (ML&TRSC) facilitated a division of his estate, delegated to the administration of Charles A. Whitney. In April 1878, just a few weeks prior to his death, Morgan conveyed shares of the company to Mary Jane Sexton Morgan, Maria Louis Morgan Whitney, Frances Eliza Morgan Quintard, Charles A. Whitney, George W. Quintard, and Richard Jessup Morgan (a grandson). Whitney was the president of the company; Alexander C. Hutchinson was the vice-president. Both held proxies from the Morgan family shareholders to manage the company.

The ML&TRSC continued to expand westward, reaching Lafayette by 1879. The company continued to operate under the goals that he established, and it was finally acquired by Southern Pacific Railroad in 1883. The railroad company persisted through 1885. Ultimately the development of the railroads severely diminished the role of coastal steamships; however, the railroad part of the enterprise remained valuable. Collis P. Huntington and Jay Gould emerged as dominant railroad developers in the region. Though Texas law prohibited interstate railroads, Huntington leased Texas railroads to bring them into the Southern Pacific Railroad system. Some of these included segments of the ML&TRSC in Texas and Louisiana.

Morgan's legacy is preserved with the 1876 renaming of Brashear to Morgan City, Louisiana, and in The Morgan School, a high school in Clinton, Connecticut, for which Morgan donated land and capital.

== Bibliography ==
- Baughman, James P. (1968). Charles Morgan and the Development of Southern Transportation. Nashville: Vanderbilt University Press.
- Andrew W. Hall (2012). The Galveston–Houston Packet: Steamboats on Buffalo Bayou. Charleston, SC: The History Press. ISBN 978-1609495916.
- Stiles, T. J. (2009). The First Tycoon: The Epic Life of Cornelius Vanderbilt. New York: Alfred A. Knopf. ISBN 978-1400031740.
