= Columbia (1835 steamboat) =

American-owned steamship

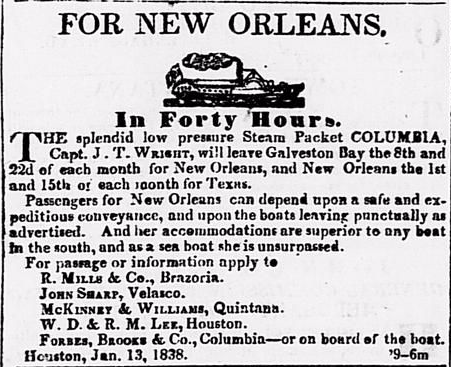
- Advertisement for the steamboat Columbia, 10 February 1838 (Via the Portal to Texas History)

History
- Name: Columbia
- Owner: New York and Charleston Steam Packet Company, Charles Morgan, Henry Windle
- Operator: Captain John T. Wright, Henry Windle
- Route: New York and Charleston; New Orleans, Galveston, and Velasco, Texas
- Acquired: 1835

General characteristics
- Tonnage: 423
- Propulsion: Steam-powered sidewheeler
- Sail plan: Double-masted

Columbia is a former steamship owned by the New York and Charleston Steam Packet Company, and built no later than 1835. This was the first coastal steam packet in the United States. The steamer was also the first of the Charles Morgan Line.

Columbia could run on wind or steam power, holding one mast both fore and aft of its side paddlewheels and its single smoke stack.

== New York and Charleston packet ==
Columbia first ran as a coastal steam packet, with service terminating at New York City and Charleston, South Carolina. Its owner, New York and Charleston Steam Packet Company, was a partnership established in June 1834 between James P. Allaire, John Haggerty, and Charles Morgan. Morgan had already established himself as a shipping agent and chandlery merchant out of his office in New York. In 1833, he divested of his chandlery in order to focus on managing his steam packet concerns. On 21 March 1835, New York and Charleston Steam Packet Company acquired the Columbia. This was one of several steamers which serviced a lucrative contract to carry United States Mail between New York and Charleston.

In October 1837, New York and Charleston Steam Packet Company suffered a great loss with the deadly and financially costly sinking of its newest steamship, the Home. This catastrophe prompted a reorganization of the company, leaving Morgan in control of operations, with Haggerty as the only remaining partner. While there is some scant evidence that ‘’Columbia’’ had been dispatched for a trial run for Gulf Coast service early as 1835, Columbia made its first packet run between New Orleans and Galveston, Texas on 25 November 1837.

== New Orleans and Galveston packet ==
This reorganized partnership then consisting of just Morgan and Haggerty is considered the beginning of the Charles Morgan Line, with Columbia known as its first ship. James Reed & Company, Columbia's agent in New Orleans, purchased shares in the steamer, even briefly owning a majority interest before liquidating on 31 October 1838. In early 1838, Columbia made a dozen runs between Galveston and Velasco, Texas, a town at the mouth of the Brazos River. At that time, the owners of the steamship Columbia formed a cartel with the owners of the steamship Cuba, an arrangement known to the public as the New Orleans and Texas Line. These arrangements included coordination of scheduling, rates, and freight. The New Orleans and Texas Line dominated this steamship market for a few years.

Columbia offered three classes of passenger travel: accommodations on deck, in the standard cabin, or in the main cabin, which was described in the journal of Mary Austin Holley, a distant relative of Stephen F. Austin. She described fine linens, silver and ivory utensils, and service from a "French cook" and a "lady-like chamber maid." During this time, the steamer was configured to accommodate sixty passengers, split between the cabin and the deck. The Columbia normally completed the New Orleans to Galveston route within a range of 35 to 40 hours, but had run its best time in 33 hours. These speeds easily exceeded the performance of sailing vessels. Columbia had two sources of power: steam and sail. Steam power propelled the ship when the wind was not favorable in terms of strength or direction. This was critical while navigating the Mississippi River below New Orleans and the narrow coastal passes near Galveston. Steam power allowed travel along a straight line. Most of the freight manifests listed personal effects. Columbia transported most of its heavy freight to the port of Galveston from New Orleans, though it also hauled cotton and hides out of Texas. In the first few months of 1838, Columbia earned over $12,000 in profit.

Columbia ran this route exclusively for about four months in 1839 after Cuba ran aground east of Galveston Island. Columbia departed New Orleans twice monthly, on the first and the fifteenth, and departed Galveston on the eighth and twenty-second. However, a rival dispatched its own steamer Neptune to run this route, breaking Morgan's exclusive service on the Texas Gulf Coast on 7 November 1839. The competition did not persist there long, and soon, Morgan's fleet regained its monopoly with its Columbia and the New York, which had been moved from the Atlantic. In January 1840, however, the Morgan and Haggerty partnership sold Columbia to Henry Windle.
