= Racer's hurricane =

Category 4 Atlantic hurricane in 1837

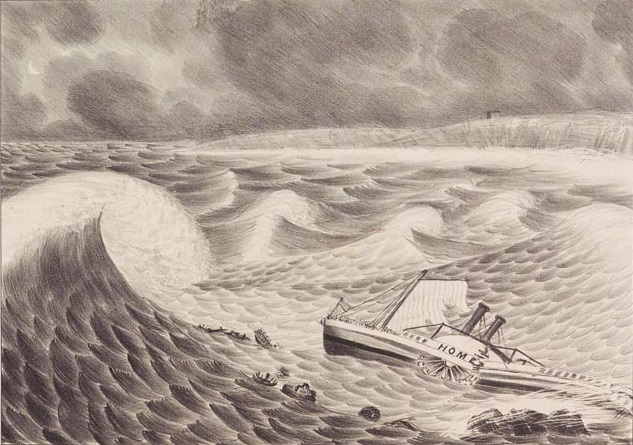
Lithograph by Nathaniel Currier depicting the loss of the SS Home on the Outer Banks during Racer's hurricane

Racer's hurricane was a destructive tropical cyclone that had severe effects in northeastern Mexico, the Republic of Texas, and the Gulf Coast of the United States in early October 1837. It was named after the Royal Navy ship HMS Racer, which encountered the cyclone in the northwestern Caribbean. Termed "one of the most famous and destructive hurricanes of the century" by meteorology historian David Ludlum, the storm first affected Jamaica with flooding rainfall and strong winds on September 26 and 27, before entering the Gulf of Mexico by October 1. As the hurricane struck northern Tamaulipas and southern Texas, it slowed to a crawl and turned sharply northeastward. The storm battered the Gulf Coast from Texas to the Florida Panhandle between October 3 and 7. After crossing the Southeastern United States, it emerged into the Atlantic shipping lanes off the Carolinas by October 9.

The effects of the tropical cyclone were far-reaching. Matamoros, on the southern bank of the Rio Grande, faced hurricane conditions for several days, with significant damage to ships. Many towns along the Texas shoreline were inundated by storm surge, which flooded the coastal plains for many miles inland. Galveston Island was devastated, with nearly every building washed away and most vessels driven ashore. To the east, a water level rise of 8 ft (2.4 m) on Lake Pontchartrain submerged low-lying areas of New Orleans. Many steamboats on the lake were wrecked and buildings along its shores demolished. Storm surge and wind damage extended into Mississippi and Alabama, but with less severity. In the interior Southeast, sugar cane and cotton crops bore heavy losses. As the weakening storm buffeted the Outer Banks of North Carolina on October 9, the passenger steamship SS Home ran aground about 300 ft (91 m) off Cape Hatteras and rapidly broke up in the pounding surf. About 90 passengers and crewmen died in the wreck. Overall, Racer's hurricane killed an estimated 105 people.

== Meteorological history ==
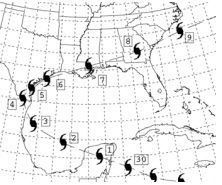
Approximate track of the hurricane from the Weather Prediction Center, with modern U.S. state and national boundaries.

Little is known about the origins of the storm. It was first noted at Barbados on September 22, but may have been a Cape Verde type hurricane arising from a westward-moving tropical wave. The intensifying hurricane had passed just south of Jamaica on September 26 and 27, affecting the island with strong winds and heavy rains. On September 28, HMS Racer, a Royal Navy sloop-of-war, encountered the hurricane in the northwestern Caribbean, with winds increasing to force 12 on the evening of September 29. She was dismasted and blown on her beam ends twice before re-righting, losing almost all rigging, navigational tools, and provisions in the process. A young boy died of injuries sustained on the lower deck, and two crewmen went missing. Racer was put in to Havana for repairs. In recognition of this ordeal, writers and historians have commonly referred to the system as Racer's storm or Racer's hurricane.

As Racer endured the gale, another vessel to her north, HMS Ringdove, felt the storm around the same time. Both ships recorded easterly winds for several days as they traversed the Yucatán Channel, indicating that the storm center remained to their south. The hurricane crossed the northern Yucatán Peninsula on October 1, passing near Mérida and Sisal in Yucatán before proceeding west-northwestward across the Gulf of Mexico. An unusually large tropical cyclone for most of its course, it peaked at the equivalent of Category 4 or 5 on the modern-day Saffir–Simpson scale. The center briefly moved ashore over extreme northern Mexico near the mouth of the Rio Grande by early on October 3. However, a strong high-pressure area to the north halted the hurricane's forward progress and redirected it northeastward. The slow-moving hurricane traced the Texas shoreline for several days from October 3 through October 5, and continued eastward, parallel to the northern U.S. Gulf Coast. It passed the Sabine River on the night of October 5–6, and made landfall in southeastern Louisiana, near Venice.

At New Orleans, the worst of the storm came late on October 6, with winds blowing from the south and southeast. According to weather historian David Ludlum, the storm likely moved ashore between Mobile, Alabama, and Pensacola, Florida. Due to the tight pressure gradient between the storm and an expansive high-pressure area centered over the Ohio Valley, damaging winds extended far to the north of the hurricane's track. The system moved northeastward across interior Alabama, Georgia, and South Carolina. Between October 8 and 10, it battered the Atlantic coast of the Carolinas as a low-end hurricane before emerging into the Atlantic near Wilmington, North Carolina. Over open water, the storm regained some of the strength it had lost over land. It continued northeastward, ultimately passing north of Bermuda and transitioning into an extratropical cyclone.

Efforts to reconstruct the hurricane's path began as early as 1838 with the work of Corps of Royal Engineers officer William Reid, who examined logbooks of ships in the Caribbean. American meteorologist William Charles Redfield had been studying the portion of the storm's track over the eastern U.S., but it would not be until 1846 that, based on Reid's work, he recognized it as a continuation of Racer's hurricane. In following years, Reid and Redfield continued to build upon each other's findings concerning the storm.

== Impact ==
Ludlum described Racer's storm as "one of the most famous and destructive hurricanes of the century." It killed an estimated 105 people along its course.

In Jamaica, heavy rainfall triggered widespread street flooding, forcing nearly all businesses in Kingston to close for the duration of the storm. Along the coast, several ships broke from their moorings; one of them struck a wharf, damaging another vessel, and was scuttled to prevent further destruction. Haiti and the southern shores of Cuba also experienced the storm.

=== Mexico ===
Matamoros, Tamaulipas, on the southern bank of the Rio Grande, experienced the hurricane for several days, beginning on October 2. The hurricane dropped torrential rainfall in parts of northern Mexico that had already experienced above-average precipitation during the late summer. Jean-Louis Berlandier, a Geneva-born naturalist living in Matamoros, measured 29.25 in (743 mm) of rain from October 1–4, including 11.25 in (286 mm) on October 3. He also wrote extensively of his experiences during the hurricane, during which he was able to hear crashing waves on the coast, some 18 mi (29 km) away, and witnessed whitecaps on floodwaters in city streets. Several ships were wrecked along the coast, and the Mexican customs house situated at the mouth of the Rio Grande was destroyed. It was later rebuilt at a more sheltered location farther inland.

=== Texas ===
The Republic of Texas and disputed territory as it appeared when the storm occurred

The storm wrought destruction along the entire coast of Texas (then the sovereign Republic of Texas and disputed Nueces Strip). The settlement at Brazos Santiago was almost totally destroyed, with only a few buildings left standing, while all ships there were sunk or driven aground. Communities along the shores of Matagorda Bay were heavily damaged, with buildings and wharves swept away. Farther north, a 6 to 7 ft (1.8 to 2.1 m) storm surge flooded Galveston Island, where nearly every building was lost, along with all supplies and provisions. Of the 30 vessels present in the harbor at Galveston when the storm began, only one remained moored following its passage. In one case, a brig was driven against a three-story warehouse, causing the building to collapse. Among the ships destroyed at Galveston were two Texas Navy schooners. In a scene of "utter desolation", some individuals in Galveston survived the flooding by holding on to floating debris for days.

Floodwaters rushed over coastal prairies for up to 20 mi (30 km), drowning livestock. The storm surge deposited ships in fields several miles inland; near Sabine Pass, a three-masted barque came to rest 7 mi (11 km) from the coast. Local residents salvaged its timbers as firewood and building materials for decades to come. Heavy surf action significantly altered the coastline at the entrance to Galveston Bay. Houston experienced a 4 ft (1.2 m) rise in water levels. Despite the damage throughout coastal Texas, only two people are known to have died there, one of them in Galveston.

=== United States ===
In New Orleans, the storm produced an 8 ft (2.4 m) storm surge on Lake Pontchartrain that flooded parts of the city as far south as Burgundy Street, with water 2 ft (0.6 m) deep invading many homes. Strong winds in the city toppled chimneys, brought down trees and fences, and unroofed homes, carrying some roofs up to 100 ft (30 m) away from the damaged buildings. In particular, the City Exchange hotel (now the site of the Omni Royal Orleans) was extensively damaged while in the final stages of its construction. Overall, hundreds of structures were damaged or destroyed in New Orleans, and shipping losses took a large economic toll on the city.

In the settlement known then as Port Pontchartrain (now part of New Orleans), a pier and breakwater sustained a combined $50,000 (1837 USD) in damage, and most buildings there were swept away. At least one person was killed in the area, and several more went missing while evacuating their homes. Numerous steamboats were wrecked on the shores of Lake Pontchartrain, and much of the Pontchartrain Railroad was flooded or washed out, with damage estimated at $100,000. The hurricane destroyed the original Bayou St. John Light, the first American lighthouse built outside the Thirteen Colonies. Torrential rains overspread areas mainly north of the storm's track; in Clinton, Louisiana, downpours lasted nearly two days. Strong winds destroyed homes and toppled trees in Baton Rouge, and ravaged forests and plantations surrounding the city. Farmers reported up to a third of their sugar cane and cotton crops lost.

All the wharves along the coast of Mississippi were destroyed, and the influx of freshwater runoff severely affected the locally prized oyster beds in the Bay of St. Louis. Across Louisiana and Mississippi, the storm killed at least six people. In Mobile, Alabama, the storm uprooted trees and damaged several buildings, including a church. Tides rose several feet above normal, flooding low-lying streets so that fishermen were able to deliver their catches directly to market by boat. Some businesses sustained minor water damage, but overall, the city was spared any significant destruction. There were descriptions of tremendous damage to wharves and warehouses along the coasts of Alabama and the Florida Panhandle, although some accounts may have been exaggerated by rival companies. Many ships were destroyed in Florida's St. Joseph and Apalachicola bays.

Throughout the Southeast, the storm caused severe agricultural damage. Major thoroughfares like the Natchez Trace and the Federal Road were made impassable by fallen trees. Reports of strong winds extended as far inland as eastern Tennessee. At Norfolk, Virginia, northeasterly gales on October 8 and 9 kept steamboats at dock. Several ships were lost along the Outer Banks. The schooner Cumberland wrecked on the Core Banks; all crew members survived and some of her cargo was salvaged. To the north, the brig Enterprize was destroyed at Bodie Island with one fatality. One sailor fell overboard and drowned when the schooner Emily ran aground at Swansboro, North Carolina.

==== SS Home ====
The newly built passenger steamship SS Home was en route from New York City to Charleston, South Carolina when she encountered strengthening northeasterly winds on October 8. As the storm worsened that night, the 220-foot (67 m) packet ship began to leak because of a broken boiler feed pipe. The next morning, as the Home took on more water than the pumps could handle, the captain steered her aground 22 mi (35 km) north of Cape Hatteras. The vessel got underway again shortly thereafter, in an effort to reach the relative shelter of the cape's leeward side and beach her there. All passengers and crewmen were ordered to assist in bailing out the water pouring into the hold, but despite their best efforts, the engine rooms were inundated and the Home was forced to continue under sail. On the night of October 9–10, the vessel grounded 300 ft (90 m) from the shore, just south of Cape Hatteras.

The largely submerged Home rapidly broke up amid the hurricane's pounding surf, and of the 130 people aboard the steamboat, only about 40 made it to shore alive: 20 out of 90 passengers and 20 crew members, including the captain. There were only three lifeboats, two of which were destroyed before they could be used; the other capsized shortly after being launched, drowning between 10 and 15 passengers. Two men used the only two life preservers aboard the Home to safely reach the beach. Among the victims were United States Senator from Georgia Oliver H. Prince and his wife, and numerous relatives of other Congressmen. The wreck of the Home occurred during a period of increasingly frequent passenger steamship tragedies, and in 1838 Congress passed reformed safety legislation for these vessels.

== See also ==
- 1830s Atlantic hurricane seasons
- Lists of United States hurricanes:
  - Texas
  - Florida
  - North Carolina
