= Averitt =

Averitt may refer to:

- Averitt Express, transportation and supply chain management company based in Cookeville, Tennessee, United States
- Averitt House (disambiguation)
- Averitt-Herod House, historic house in Hartsville, Tennessee, U.S.
- Averitt-Winchester House, historic house in Miccosukee, Florida, U.S.
- Bird Averitt (1952–2020), American basketball player
- Bush Stadium at Averitt Express Baseball Complex, baseball venue in Cookeville, Tennessee, United States
- Dawn Averitt (born 1968), American HIV/AIDS treatment policy advocate and activist
- Jack N. Averitt College of Graduate Studies, one of the eight colleges at Georgia Southern University in Statesboro, Georgia
- Kip Averitt (born 1954), former Republican member of the Texas Senate

== See also ==
- Averett (disambiguation)
- Everitt
