= Ring Oak Plantation =

Quail hunting plantation in Florida, United States

Coordinates: 30°34′58.1″N 84°0′23.6″W

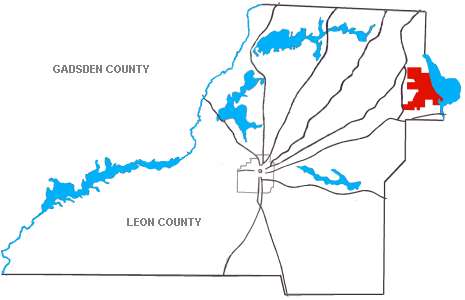
Location of Ring Oak Plantation in 1947

Ring Oak Plantation is a large quail hunting plantation located in northeast Leon County, Florida.

== Origins ==
Ring Oak originally was the land of antebellum cotton plantations Blakely Plantation and Ingleside Plantation.

Prior to it having a name, this 13,000 acres (5,300 ha) property began as a venture sometimes referred to as the Ireland-Ingalls ownership. This was a joint business/leisure concern between David S. Ingalls and Robert Livingston Ireland, Jr. Ingalls was a director of Pan Am World Airways and publisher of Cincinnati Times-Star. Ireland was an executive with M.A. Hanna Company, a coal company. By 1947 Ring Oak was established as a separate plantation and was owned by David S. and Louise Ingalls.

Ring Oak had its own private landing strip making it possible for David Ingalls, an accomplished pilot, to leave Cleveland, Ohio on a Saturday and arrive for the opening of dove hunting season. The landing strip is there today. The name Ring Oak refers to a circular cut made around the live oak trees on the plantation and it's suggested that these rings were the work of local Native Americans and forced the tree to die so that canoes could be made. Many trees survived, scabbing over and creating a noticeable ring.

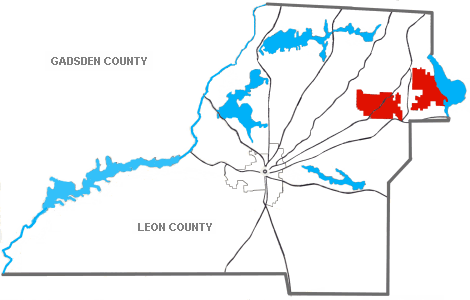
Location of Ring Oak Plantation in 1967

The Ingalls also made purchases of Chemonie Plantation originally owned by George Noble Jones. In 1949, Ingalls and Ireland purchased the 14,000-acre (57 km^{2}) Foshalee Plantation.

Under the Ingalls, Ring Oak had a hog parlor with 300 head of hogs. Ring Oak, with Chemonie Plantation, had 1,000 acres (400 ha) in corn in patches of 1 to 2 acres (0.40 to 0.81 ha).

== Location ==
Ring Oak borders Lake Miccosukee on its east side. During its history, boundaries often changed when owners bought or sold land.

In 1967 Ring Oak was under sole ownership of Louise Ingalls and had two distinct sections which was not uncommon for plantations in Leon County. Currently Ring Oak is owned by the GEM land company of Tallahassee. Ring Oak's current size is around 6,000 acres (2,400 ha).

Adjacent plantations in 1967:

- Woodfield Springs Plantation to the north
- Loveridge Plantation to the north
