= Woodfield Springs Plantation =

Quail hunting plantation in Florida, United States

Coordinates: 30.5785°N 84.0986°W

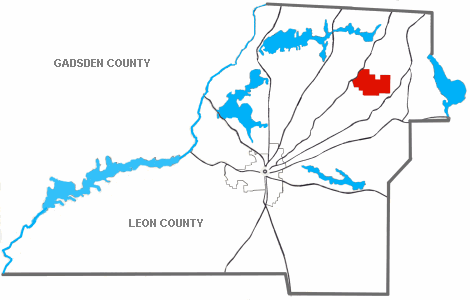
Woodfield Springs Plantation in 1967

Woodfield Spring Plantation was a large quail hunting plantation in northern Leon County, Florida, United States.

Woodfield Springs was owned by Gilbert W. Humphrey, an executive with the M.A. Hanna Company of Cleveland, Ohio serving as president of the company in 1960 and chairman of the board in 1961. Humphrey's father also was an executive with Hanna and U.S. Secretary of the Tresaury. Mr. Humphrey's father in law was Robert Livingston Ireland, Jr., owner of Foshalee Plantation.

Woodfield Springs has lands in 3 counties covering 8,000 acres (32 km^{2}).

Adjacent plantations:

- Ring Oak Plantation western section on the south.
- Horseshoe Plantation to the west

== Tragedy ==
On October 5, 1967, Astronaut Clifton C. Williams died instantly when his T-38 Talon crashed in a remote part of Woodfield Springs.
