= Tall Timbers =

Tall Timbers may refer to:

- Tall Timbers, St. Mary's County, Maryland, United States
- Tall Timbers (film), a 1937 film directed by Ken G. Hall
- Tall Timbers Plantation, a former quail hunting plantation in Leon County, Florida, United States
  - Tall Timbers Research Station and Land Conservancy, a research and learning facility on the former plantation

== See also ==
- Tall Timber (disambiguation)
