= Loveridge Plantation =

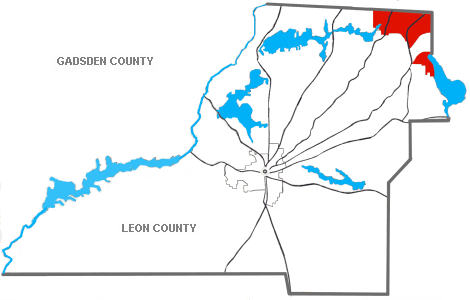
Location of Loveridge Plantation in 1967

Loveridge Plantation is a quail hunting plantation located in northern Leon County, Florida, United States and established by George H. Love. Loveridge began as 1,000 acres (400 ha) on the northwest corner of Lake Miccosukee. In 1956, Love acquired an additional 10,500 acres (4,200 ha) of Sunny Hill Plantation (northern section in map) from the estate of New Jersey Governor Walter E. Edge.

George H. Love was a native of Pittsburgh, Pennsylvania. He was Chairman of the Board of the M.A. Hanna Company and succeeded George M. Humphrey when he became United States Secretary of the Treasury in 1953.

Love had been chairman of the board of Consolidation Coal Company, America's largest coal company. After reviving the coal industry, Love became Chairman of the Board of the Chrysler Corporation.

Adjacent plantations:

- Norias Plantation to the north
- Foshalee Plantation to the west
- Welaunee Plantation to the southwest
- Ring Oak Plantation to the south
