= Miccosukee, Florida =

Miccosukee
- Census-Designated Place
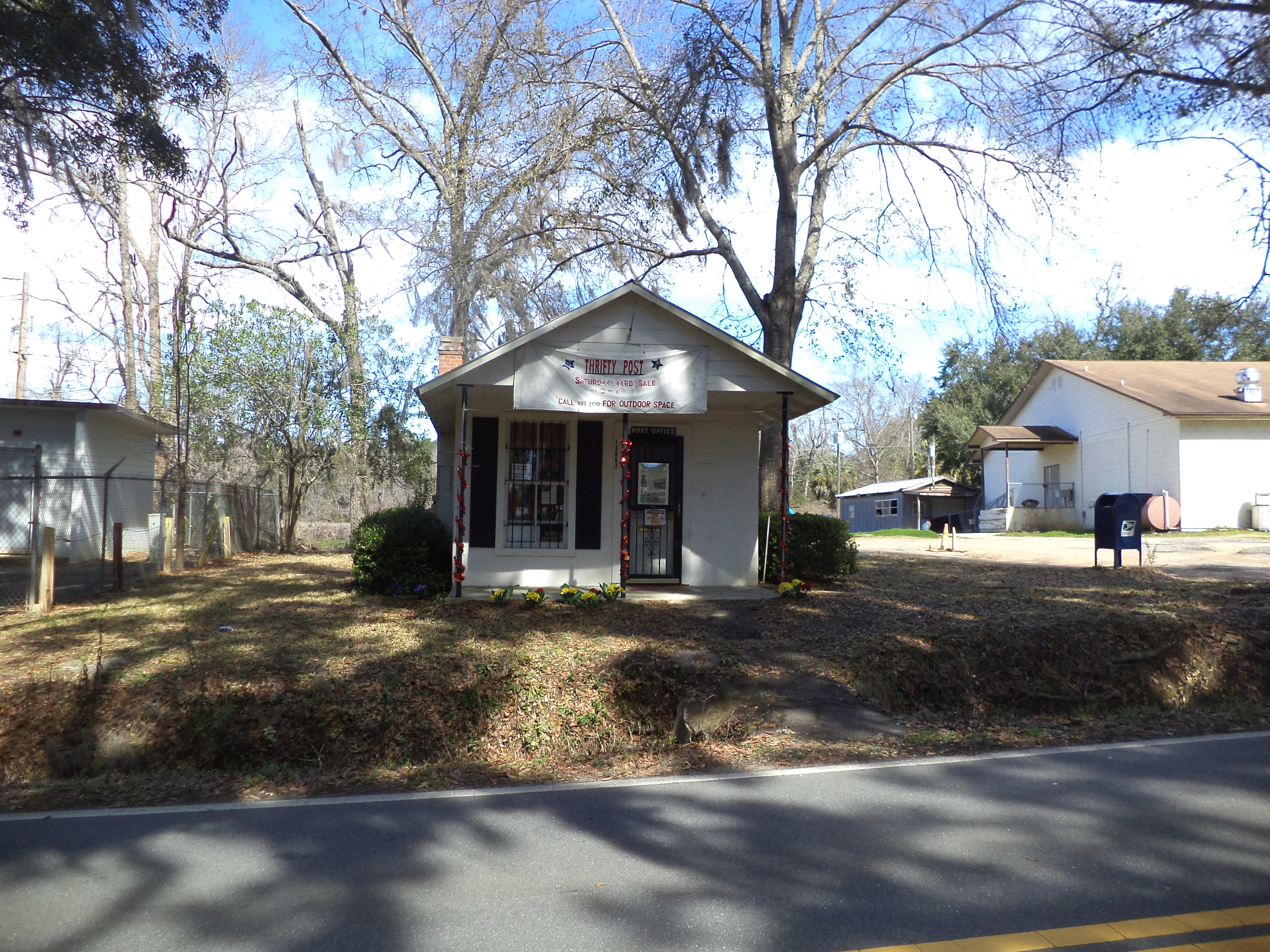
- Post office

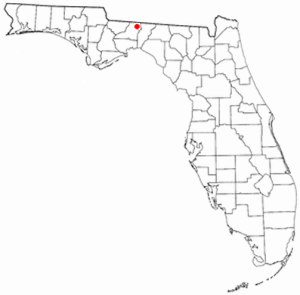
- Coordinates: 30°35′35″N 84°02′49″W
- Country: United States
- State: Florida
- County: Leon County
- Elevation: 217 ft (66 m)

Population (2020)
  - Total: 383
- Time zone: UTC-5 (Eastern (EST))
  - Summer (DST): UTC-4 (EDT)
- ZIP code: 32309
- Area code: 850
- GNIS feature ID: 2805179

Miccosukee is a small unincorporated community and census-designated place (CDP) in northeastern Leon County, Florida, United States. The population was 383 at the time of the 2020 census. It is part of the Tallahassee metropolitan area. Miccosukee was a major center of the Miccosukee tribe, one of the tribes of the developing Seminole nation, during the 18th century.

== Geography ==
Miccosukee, like other unincorporated areas in northern Leon County, is an area of rolling hills dotted with ponds and lakes. The large, swampy Lake Miccosukee borders the eastern edge of the community. It is located at the junction of County Roads 59 and 151.

== History ==
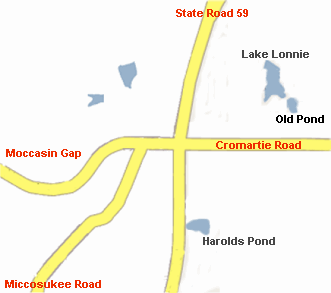
Settlement of Miccosukee, Leon County, Florida

The town of Miccosukee or Mikasuki was settled by members of the Miccosukee tribe, a group of Creek origin who had settled in Florida and became identified with the developing Seminole nation. It was mapped by the British in 1778 and originally called Mikasuki with 60 homes, 28 families, and a town square. It was the capital of the short-lived State of Muskogee.

At the time of the 1818 American invasion of Spanish Florida, during the First Seminole War, "Andrew Jackson and his men were stunned by the sheer size of the Miccosukee town. Having been occupied since before the American Revolution, it was a town of long-standing permanence." Jackson burned over 300 homes before departing on April 5, 1818. Whites estimated there were up to 500 warriors, and "the town was the largest in Florida at the time".

In 1831, a U.S. Post Office was built along with schools, churches, and stores. Eventually the area, along with most of Leon County, became a center of cotton plantations (see Plantations of Leon County). Prior to the Civil War, Miccosukee had three cotton plantations nearby, Miccosukee Plantation, Ingleside Plantation and Blakely Plantation.

After the Civil War, the area reverted to farms and by 1887, the Florida Central Railroad served Miccosukee. During the 1890s, wealthy industrialists bought large tracts of land for quail hunting plantations or estates removing thousands of acres of land from agricultural production. Miccosukee thrived until the boll weevil infestation of 1918. The Great Depression (1929-1935) destroyed Leon County's agriculture and the railroad pulled out in the mid-1940s.

== Demographics ==
Miccosukee first appeared as a census designated place in the 2020 U.S. census.

=== 2020 census ===
Miccosukee racial composition (NH = Non-Hispanic) (Note: Note: the US Census treats Hispanic/Latino as an ethnic category. This table excludes Latinos from the racial categories and assigns them to a separate category. Hispanics/Latinos can be of any race.)
Race	Number	Percentage
White (NH)	210	54.83%
Black or African American (NH)	149	38.9%
Asian (NH)	3	0.78%
Some Other Race (NH)	2	0.52%
Mixed/Multi-Racial (NH)	15	3.92%
Hispanic or Latino	4	1.04%
Total	383	

As of the 2020 United States census, there were 383 people, 120 households, and 70 families residing in the CDP.

== Historical places ==
- Concord School (Miccosukee) was built in 1894 in the town of Miccosukee for grades 1-6. It was closed in 1985. The building is still used for Miccosukee's Head Start program.
- Van Brunt-Morris House just north of the junction of State Road 59 and Moccasin Gap Road.
- Averitt-Winchester House
- Miccosukee Methodist Church
- Strickland-Herold House, located northwest of the junction of State Road 59 and Moccasin Gap Road.

== Civil War history ==
During the Civil War, soldiers from Miccosukee enlisted in Company K, 5th Florida Infantry and Company B, 1st Florida Cavalry.

== Political ==
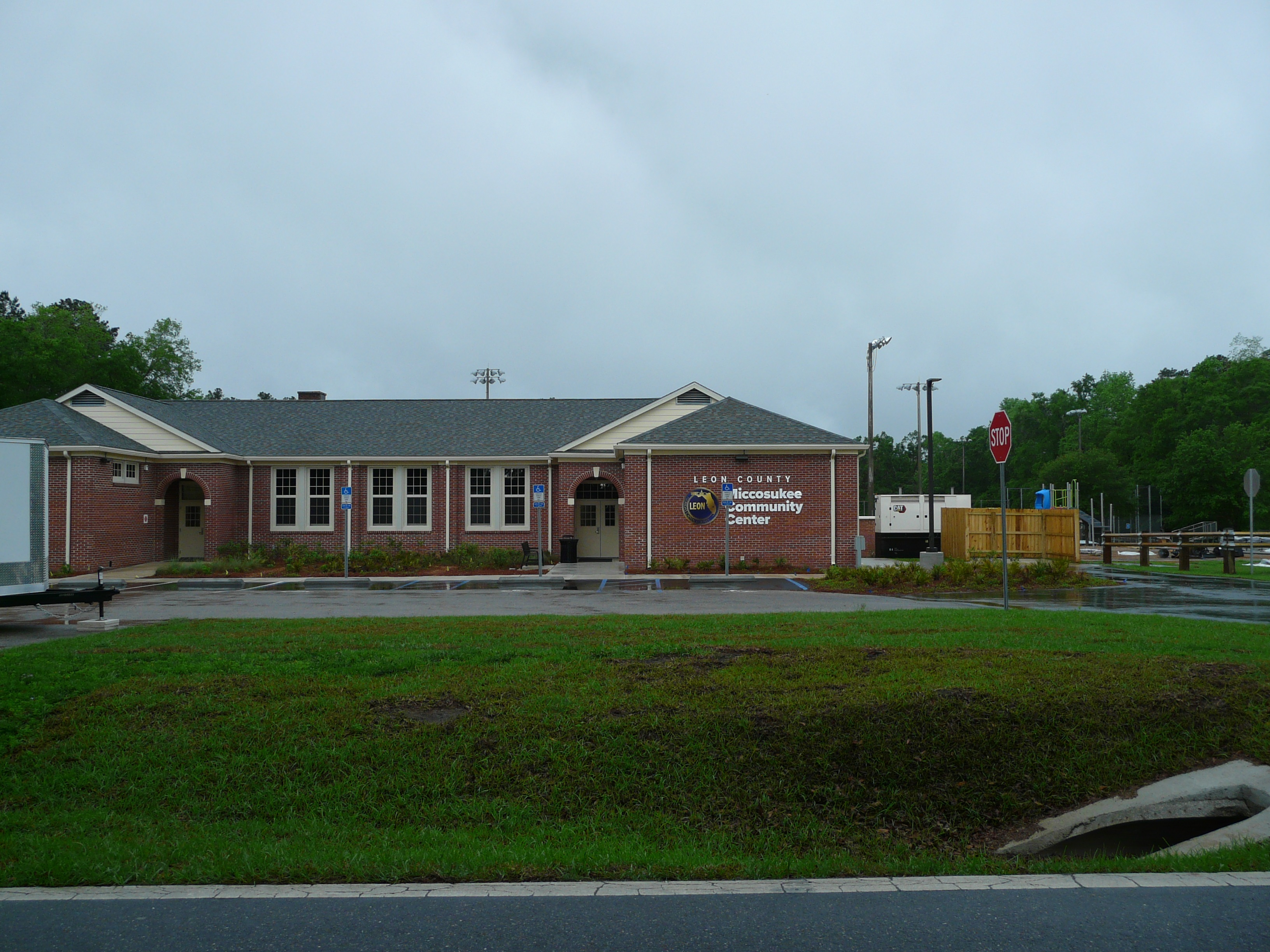
Miccosukee Community Center

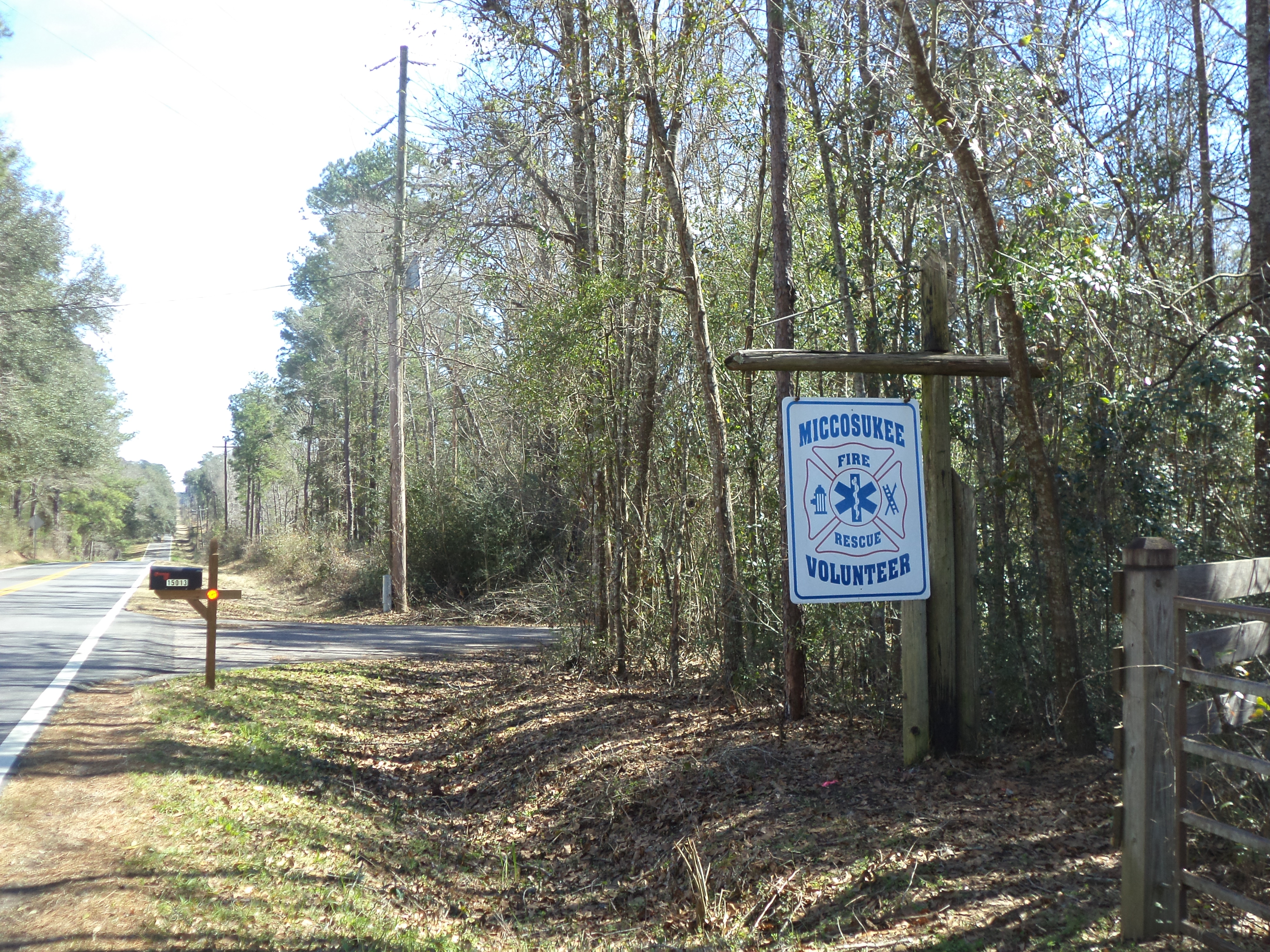
Miccosukee Volunteer Fire Department on Cromartie Road.

Miccosukee Governmental Representation
Position	Name	Party
County Commission At-Large	Carolyn Cummings	Democrat
County Commission At-Large	Nick Maddox	Democrat
Commissioner Dist. 4	Brian Welch	Democrat
U.S. House	Neal Dunn	Republican
Florida House	Alison Tant	Democrat

== Community facilities ==
- Concord School - Served as a Leon County elementary school until it closed in 1985. The school yard now serves as a county park.
- The Miccosukee Community Center is administered by the Tallahassee-Leon County Parks and Recreation Department. The center is used for a variety of activities including monthly "Senior Outreach" days.
- Reeves Landing is a public boat launching facility on Lake Miccosukee just east of the village.

== Education ==
All of the county is in the Leon County School District. Miccosukee Youth Education Foundation provides assistance.

== Fire & Rescue ==
Miccosukee Volunteer Fire & Rescue was established in 1978 with the merger of Miccosukee Land Cooperative and Miccosukee in 1979. The department has 3 fire stations: Cromartie Road Station, Co-op Station and Heatherwood Station, each with a pumper truck. The Tallahassee Fire Department also provides support.

== See also ==
- Miccosukee Land Co-op
- History of Leon County, Florida
- Plantations of Leon County
