= Sunny Hill Plantation =

Hunting plantation in Florida, USA

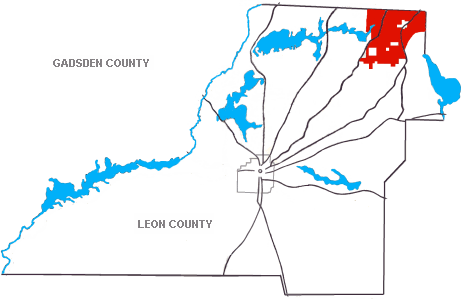
Location of Sunny Hill Plantation in 1947

Sunny Hill Plantation was a large hunting plantation in northern Leon County, Florida.

== Plantation ==
Sunny Hill Plantation was established by Lewis S. Thompson in 1913, and was created from the former W. G. Ponder Plantation. Just before World War I, Thompson purchased land to the north swelling the plantation to around 20,000 acres (8,100 ha).

Adjacent plantations:

- Foshalee Plantation to the west
- Horseshoe Plantation to the southwest
- Norias Plantation to the east

== Owners ==
=== Lewis S. Thompson ===
Thompson was a resident of Red Bank, New Jersey. His father was William P. Thompson, an oil man from West Virginia had become treasurer of Standard Oil under John D. Rockefeller. Lewis was a prominent Republican in New Jersey and was a delegate to Republican National Convention from Brookdale, Essex County, N.J. Thompson was also a member in good standing with the Boone and Crockett Club founded by Theodore Roosevelt. Having inherited much of his fortune, Thompson enjoyed outdoor activities of marksmanship, hunting, fishing, and raising dogs. Lewis Thompson died in 1936.

=== Geraldine L. Thompson ===
Lewis' wife, Geraldine Livingston Thompson co-owned Brookdale Farm, a thoroughbred horse training facility in Lincroft, New Jersey. Brookdale became Thompson Park in Monmouth County. She hosted Ava Alice Muriel Astor as a guest. Astor was the daughter of John Jacob Astor IV, who died during the sinking of RMS Titanic in 1912. Thompson, active in Republican politics, was a member of the Republican National Committee from Monmouth County, New Jersey, and an alternate New Jersey delegate to the Republican National Convention in 1940, 1948, and 1952. She died September 9, 1967, and was buried at St. James' Churchyard, Hyde Park, New York.

== 2nd owner ==
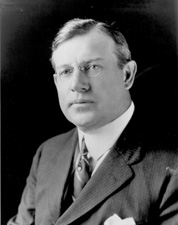
Walter E. Edge

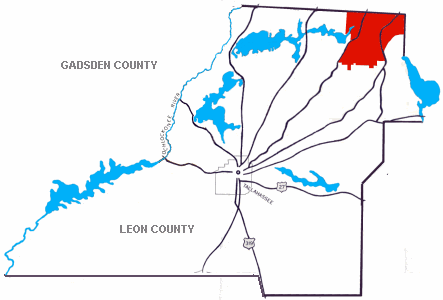
Location of Sunny Hill Plantation in 1967

In 1937, Sunny Hill was purchased by Walter E. Edge who had sold his portion of Norias Plantation the year before. The transaction required 19 pages of deeds and records. Edge spent more time at Sunny Hill after completing his 2nd term as Governor of New Jersey from 1944-1947. In 1966, Mr. Camilla Edge kept a herd of 100 Black Angus cattle. Out of 6,000 acres (2,400 ha), 780 acres (320 ha) out were set aside for growing corn, 14 for cotton, and 27 for peanuts.

John W. Mettler, Jr. of New Brunswick, New Jersey, son of John Wyckoff Mettler the founder and president of Interwoven Stocking Company of Somerset County, New Jersey, purchased 6,000 acres (2,400 ha) of Sunny Hill.

By 1967, the land once known as Sunny Hill was purchased by other concerns and became Loveridge Plantation and Welaunee Plantation.

== Current ==
Today, Sunny Hill is listed as part of the Audubon Society's Important Bird Areas Of Florida as a conservation easement along with Tall Timbers Research Station and Land Conservancy, Horseshoe Plantation, Chemonie Plantation, Foshalee Plantation, and Woodfield Springs Plantation.
