= Foshalee Plantation =

Quail hunting plantation in Florida, United States

Coordinates: 30.6617°N 84.12036°W

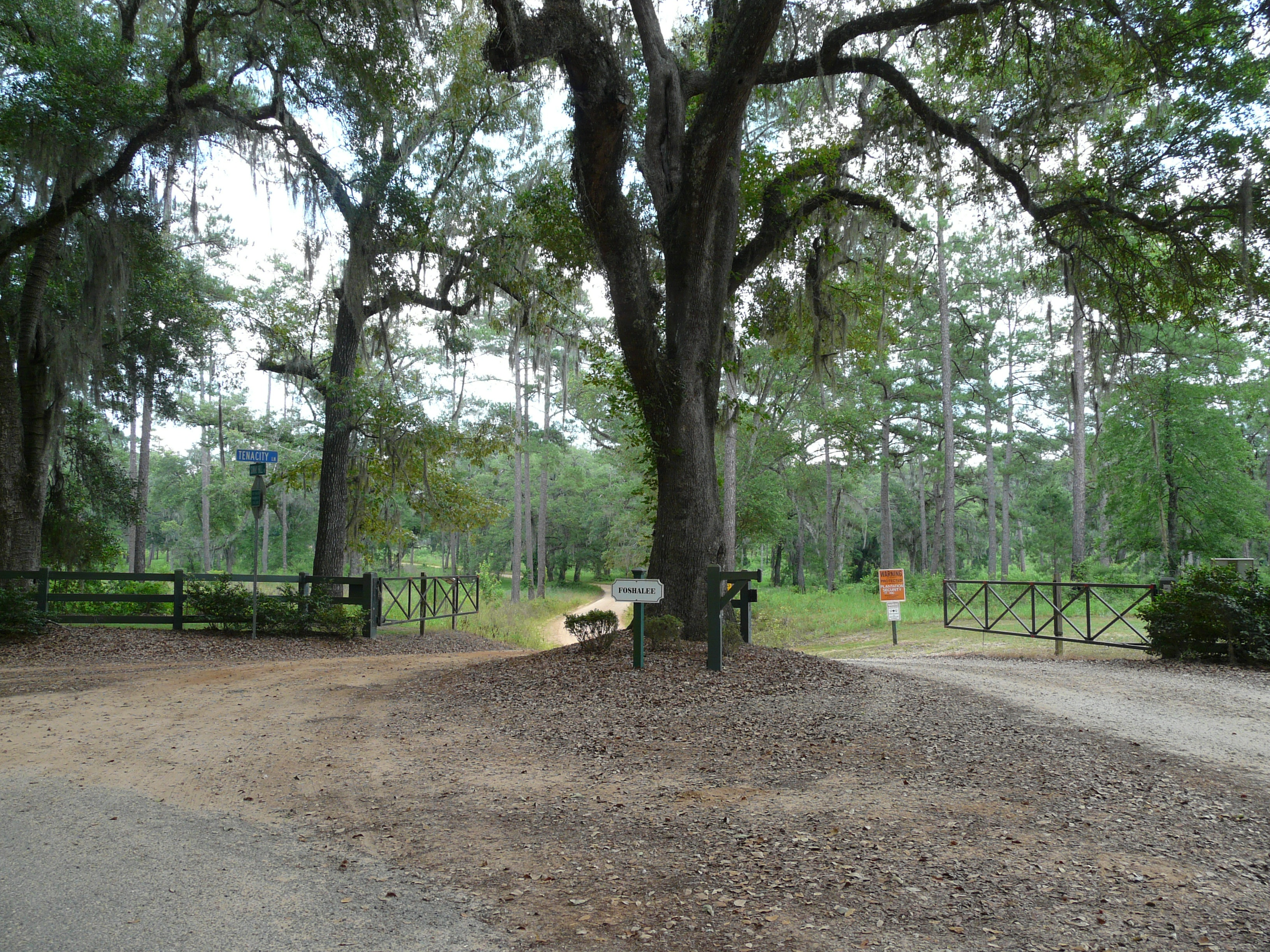
Plantation entrance on Sunny Hill Road

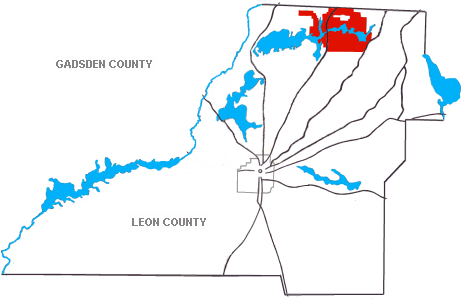
Foshalee Plantation in 1947

Foshalee Plantation was a large quail hunting plantation located in northern Leon County, Florida, United States.

== History ==
First called Incochee, it was purchased in 1824 by Hezekiah and Ann Graham Ponder. Hezekiah and Ann are buried in a cemetery near U.S. 319.

During the antebellum years the land was owned by John Miller and totaled 515 acres (2.08 km^{2}). During the 1890s, the very wealthy Hanna family, owners of the M. A. Hanna Company, had been visiting Thomasville, Georgia regularly like many northern wealthy people. During the latter 1890s, the Hannas' crossed the Florida border and began purchasing land in Leon County.

Sydney E. Hutchinson of Philadelphia, Pennsylvania purchased the land to be called Foshalee Plantation between 1910 and 1914. The land lay west of Foshalee Slough, a swampy lowland extending from the eastern edge of Lake Iamonia. The purchase was for several miles of property to the east of the lake as well as to the north and south. Eventually Hutchinson would extend Foshalee to 14,000 acres (57 km^{2}).

Between the late 1910s and early 1920s, Hutchinson sold Foshalee to Harry Payne Whitney, a wealthy yachtsman and horse breeder. Whitney died October 26, 1930, and his wife, Gertrude Vanderbilt Whitney, great-granddaughter of Commodore Cornelius Vanderbilt. kept Foshalee in operation until 1938. That year Mrs. Whitney sold the 11,456-acre (46.36 km^{2}) Foshalee to Mrs. F. Ambrose Clark of Westbury, Long Island, New York for $190,000. Mrs. Clark kept the property until 1949 after she was thrown by a horse which had stumbled into a nest of yellow jackets.

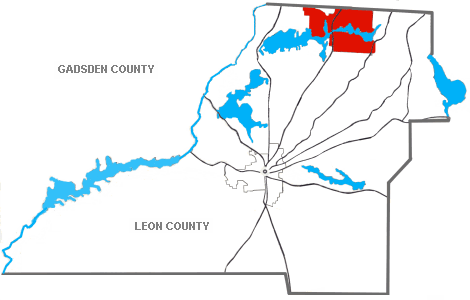
Foshalee Plantation in 1967

1947 Adjacent plantations

- Tall Timbers Plantation to the west
- Sunny Hill Plantation to the east
- Horseshoe Plantation to the south

After Mrs. Clark, Foshalee then became a joint ownership of property between Robert Livingston Ireland, Jr. and David S. Ingalls of Cleveland, Ohio. Ingalls was a director of Pan Am World Airways and publisher of the Cincinnati Times-Star. Ireland was an executive with M.A. Hanna Company, an extensive and powerful coal company. The Ingalls and Ireland families shared Foshalee equally as well as their properties of Ring Oak Plantation and Chemonie Plantation.

By 1966, Foshalee reported it had 5 tractors with 700 acres (2.8 km^{2}) under cultivation, 500 of which were corn, 60 growing peanuts, and 80 acres (320,000 m^{2}) left for dove.

1967 Adjacent plantations:

- Sunny Hill Plantation to the east
- Loveridge Plantation to the north
- Horseshoe Plantation to the south

== Publications ==
Rogers, William Warren, FOSHALEE Quail Country Plantation (with an overview of Leon County FL and Thomas Country GA). Sentry Press 1989, ASIN B000M0VHBY
