= Norias Plantation =

Coordinates: 30.6316°N 84.0265°W

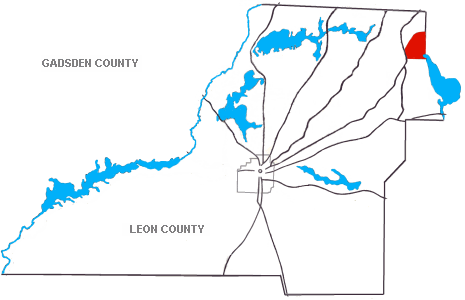
Norias Plantation in 1947

Norias Plantation is a small quail hunting plantation located north of Lake Miccosukee in northeastern Leon County, Florida, United States.

The land for Norias was sold by Colonel Lewis S. Thompson of Sunny Hill Plantation to Walter E. Edge, Governor of New Jersey and his hunting companion and longtime friend, Walter C. Teagle, Chairman of The Board of Standard Oil Company of New Jersey just after World War I. The plantation was named for a Missouri Pacific Railroad stop in Texas where Edge and Teagle had previously hunted. After the purchase, Norias' size swelled to a total of 18,395 acres (74.44 km^{2}).

In 1937, Gov. Edge gave up his partnership in Norias and purchased Sunny Hill Plantation after the death of Lewis Thompson. In 1962, Walter Teagle died and a New York City advertising executive by the name of Clifford L. Fitzgerald, Partner of Dancer Fitzgerald Sample purchased most of Norias with Robert Livingston Ireland, Jr., an executive with the M. A. Hanna Company purchasing several acres.
