= Mistletoe (disambiguation) =

Mistletoe is the common name for many species of parasitic plants.

Mistletoe may also refer to:

- Mistletoe (album), a 2003 comedy album by The Bob & Tom Show
- "Mistletoe" (Colbie Caillat song), 2007
- "Mistletoe" (Justin Bieber song), 2011
- Mistletoe (novel), a 2019 novel by Alison Littlewood
- Mistletoe, Kentucky, an unincorporated community
- Mistletoe (Natchez, Mississippi), a historic house
- USS Mistletoe, three ships of the U.S. Navy

== See also ==
- Mistletoe Plantation, quail hunting plantation in Florida
- Mistletoe State Park, Georgia
- Mistletoe Villa, historical place in North Carolina
- Mistel, a type of German bomber during World War II
- Mistilteinn, in Icelandic mythology, Hrómundr Gripsson's sword
