= Miccosukee Plantation =

Human settlement in United States of America

Coordinates: 30.5918°N 84.0186°W

Miccosukee Plantation was a medium-sized forced-labor farm of 2,517 acres (10 km^{2}) located in eastern Leon County, Florida, USA. It was developed by John Miller, from Duplin County, North Carolina, who had migrated south during the period of Indian Removal in the 1830s. He depended on the labor of enslaved African Americans to develop the plantation and produce cotton as a commodity crop.

== Location ==
Miccosukee Plantation was located in eastern Leon County near Lake Miccosukee and the village of Miccosukee, most likely north of Blakely Plantation.

== Plantation specifics ==
The Leon County Florida 1860 Agricultural Census shows that Miccosukee Plantation had the following:

- Improved Land: 1400 acres (5½ km^{2})
- Unimproved Land: 1300 acres (5 km^{2})
- Cash value of plantation: $35,000
- Cash value of farm implements/machinery: $250
- Cash value of farm animals: $15,000
- Number of slaves: 80
- Bushels of corn: 5000
- Bales of cotton: 180

Miller grazed 266 head of cattle, 160 sheep, and 250 hogs on the lowlands of Miccosukee.

== Owner ==
Miller was born in 1798 in Duplin County, North Carolina where he became a merchant and was appointed postmaster. He migrated to Florida but returned briefly to Duplin County to marry Sarah Eliza Houston in 1850. She returned with him to Florida. Miller died in 1865 and is buried in Leon County.

== Sources ==
- Paisley, Clifton; From Cotton To Quail, University of Florida Press, c1968.
