= Tall Timbers Plantation =

Historic house in Florida, US

- U.S. National Register of Historic Places
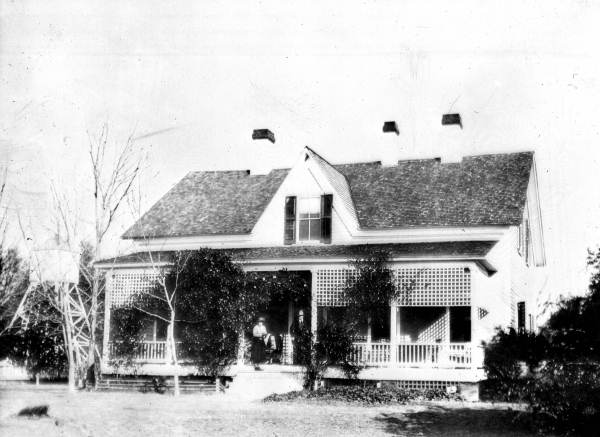
- Main house in 1913

- Location within Florida Location within the United States
- Location: Leon County, Florida
- Nearest city: Tallahassee
- Coordinates: 30.6565°N 84.20875°W
- NRHP reference No.: 89000240
- Added to NRHP: April 7, 1989

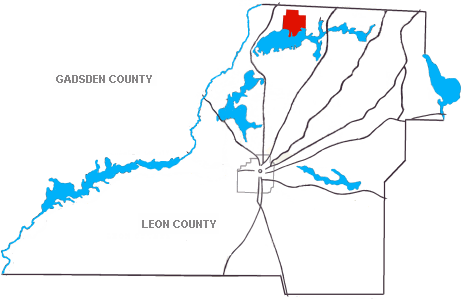
Tall Timbers Plantation in 1947

Tall Timbers Plantation was a quail hunting plantation located in northern Leon County, Florida, United States established by Edward Beadel in 1895. The Beadel House was destroyed by fire on March 16, 2026.

== History ==
In 1826, John Phinzy of Georgia purchased Lot 4 of Section 22, Township 3 North, Range 1 East. In 1827, Samuel Bryan purchased Lot 1, Section 22 and Island 3 on Lake Iamonia within Section 22. In 1834, Dr. Griffin W. Holland, of Virginia purchased Lots 2 and 3 of Section 22, Township 3 North, Range 1 East naming the property Woodlawn. Dr. Holland lived at Woodlawn for about 10 years. Holland sold the land to Alexander Mosely in 1871.

Edward Beadel was an avid sportsman from New York City and had been coming to the Piney Woods Hotel, a massive wood structure in Thomasville, Georgia for some time. The hotel was built around 1885 and attracted New Yorkers to Thomasville during the winter months. (The Piney Woods burned in 1906).

Beadel would often cross the Florida border to hunt on the property of Charlie Davis. Beadel was so impressed with Leon County that he purchased 2,200 acres (890 ha) of land along the north shore of Lake Iamonia for $8000. The property had been owned by the heirs of Eugene H. Smith and was called Hickory Hill. It consisted of land from the former Woodlawn Plantation and other land to the west. Beadel built a $3000 home where a plantation house had once stood and renamed the property Tall Timbers. The home had its own water tower, boat house, and other outbuildings.

Tall Timbers was used not only for quail hunting, but also rabbit, dove, pheasant and duck.

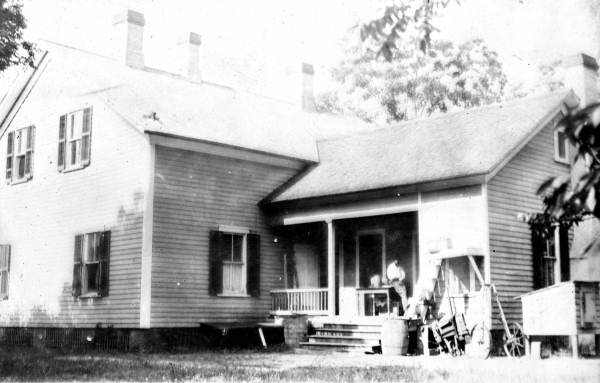
The house at Tall Timbers in 1919

In 1919, Edward Beadel died and the property passed to his nephew, Henry Ludlow Beadel who had been hunting in Leon County since 1894. Henry Beadel enlarged the plantation to 2,800 acres (1,100 ha). Field hunting was accomplished via horse-drawn carriage. For duck hunting, Henry used a handmade tin boat of between 8 and 9 feet in length. Tall Timbers also had a number of canoes. By this time, the house had a huge stone fireplace and rustic furniture fit for a lodge. The exterior had a sweeping porch facing the lake.

Adjacent plantations: In 1947 Foshalee Plantation bordered Tall Timbers on the east. In 1967, Mistletoe Plantation bordered Tall Timbers on the extreme northwest.

Henry Beadel's will left the plantation for use as a nature preserve for wildlife research. In 1963, his cousin, also named Henry Beadel, established the Tall Timbers Research Station Foundation for land and wildlife management. On April 7, 1989, 2,800 acres (11 km^{2}) of the property was added to the U.S. National Register of Historic Places.

== Lightning ==
The Tallahassee Fire Department responded to a fire alarm at 13093 Henry Beadel Drive on March 16, 2026, which was confirmed by a caller on-site that flames were visible from the historic structure's roof. When firefighters arrived, they observed a fire on the second floor spreading to the attic. While attacking the fire, nearby structures were saved, as well as some historical items and antiques from the Beadel House. The intense fire caused the second floor to collapse, resulting in a complete loss of the Beadel House. Lightning was believed to the cause of the fire.

== See also ==
- Woodlawn
- Tall Timbers Research Station and Land Conservancy
