= George Love =

George Love may refer to:

- George M. Love (1831–1887), colonel in the Union Army and Medal of Honor recipient
- George H. Love (1900–1991), American businessman and industrialist
