= Averitt House =

Averitt House may refer to:

- Averitt House (Mount Pleasant, Arkansas), listed on the National Register of Historic Places in Miller County, Arkansas
- Averitt-Winchester House, Miccosukee, Florida, listed on the NRHP in Florida
- Averitt-Herod House, Hartsville, Tennessee, listed on the National Register of Historic Places in Tennessee
