= Woodlawn (Leon County) =

Cotton plantation in Florida, United States

Coordinates: 30.6589°N 84.2105°W

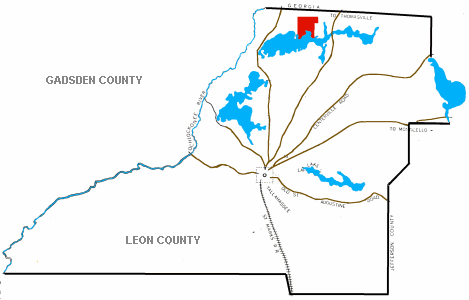
Location of the G.W. Holland Plantation

Woodlawn was a large forced-labor farm of 2,503 acres (1,013 ha) located in northern Leon County, Florida, United States established by Dr. Griffin Holland in 1834. It contained good portion of County Road 12, Gallen Drive, Henry Beadel Drive including Tall Timbers Research Station, Iamonia and Landing Road including the small African-American neighborhoods located on Waterfront Drive, Pelican Lane, Seagull Lane, and Annabelle Lane.

== Property history ==
In 1834, Dr. Griffin W. Holland of Virginia purchased Lots 2 and 3 of Section 22, Township 3 North, Range 1 East, naming the property Woodlawn. Dr. Holland lived there until about 1844 and sold the land to Alexander Mosely in 1871. Mosely was a 30-year-old farmer and Civil War veteran from Leon County. During his 9 years at Woodlawn Mosely would also become Leon County Sheriff, causing him to sell it and move to Tallahassee. Eugene H. Smith, a storekeeper from Thomasville, Georgia, bought it from Mosely in 1880. Smith then renamed the property Hickory Hill and lived there for 15 years before his widow sold the property to Edward Beadle of New York City. Beadle turned it into quail hunting plantation called Tall Timbers Plantation. It would be passed down to Beadle's nephew and then later become the property of Tall Timbers Research Station and Land Conservancy.

== Plantation statistics ==
The Leon County Florida 1860 Agricultural Census shows that Woodlawn had the following:

- Improved Land: 1,200 acres (490 ha)
- Unimproved Land: 1,400 acres (570 ha)
- Cash value of plantation: $30,000
- Cash value of farm implements/machinery: $1200
- Cash value of farm animals: $7000
- Number of forced laborers: 95
- Bushels of corn: 7000
- Bales of cotton: 225
