= Van Brunt House =

Historic house in Florida, United States

- U.S. National Register of Historic Places
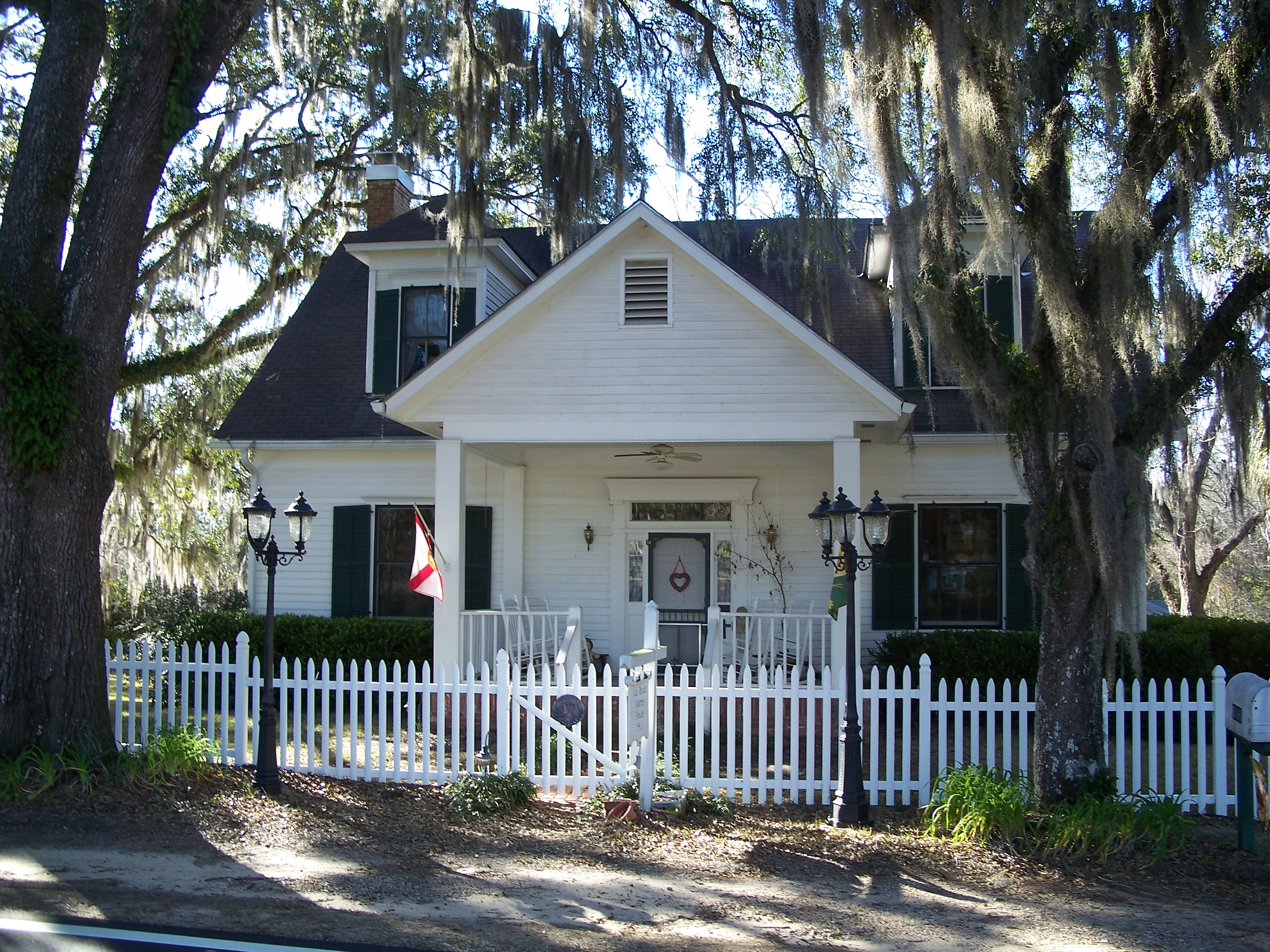

- Location within Florida Location within the United States
- Location: Miccosukee, Florida
- Coordinates: 30°35′47″N 84°2′29″W
- NRHP reference No.: 97000162
- Added to NRHP: February 27, 1997

The Van Brunt House (also known as the Morris House) is a historic home in Miccosukee, northeastern Leon County, Florida, US.

== Location ==
Van Brunt House is located on State Road 59, north of the junction with Moccasin Gap Road. On February 27, 1997, it was added to the US National Register of Historic Places.

== History and construction ==
The home was constructed in 1911 by Richard A. Van Brunt, a merchant who owned and operated a country general store in Miccosukee. It is a wood framed vernacular building with a symmetrical facade. There is a central main door with transom and side lights. It has a side gabled roof with dominant gable returns. Further, it has two chimneys that serve six fireplaces. The gable returns were possibly borrowed from the Methodist Church and Averitt-Winchester House. Van Brunt and his neighbor, Dr. Strickland, were from the Iamonia community, where Van Brunt ran a successful general store and cotton business. His business was also moved to Miccosukee but it was short-lived. Rinaldo F. Van Brunt died in 1914 and his widow continued in life by boarding teachers employed at the Concord School.
