= Kingscote (mansion) =

Historic house in Rhode Island, United States

- U.S. National Register of Historic Places
- U.S. National Historic Landmark
- U.S. National Historic Landmark District – Contributing property
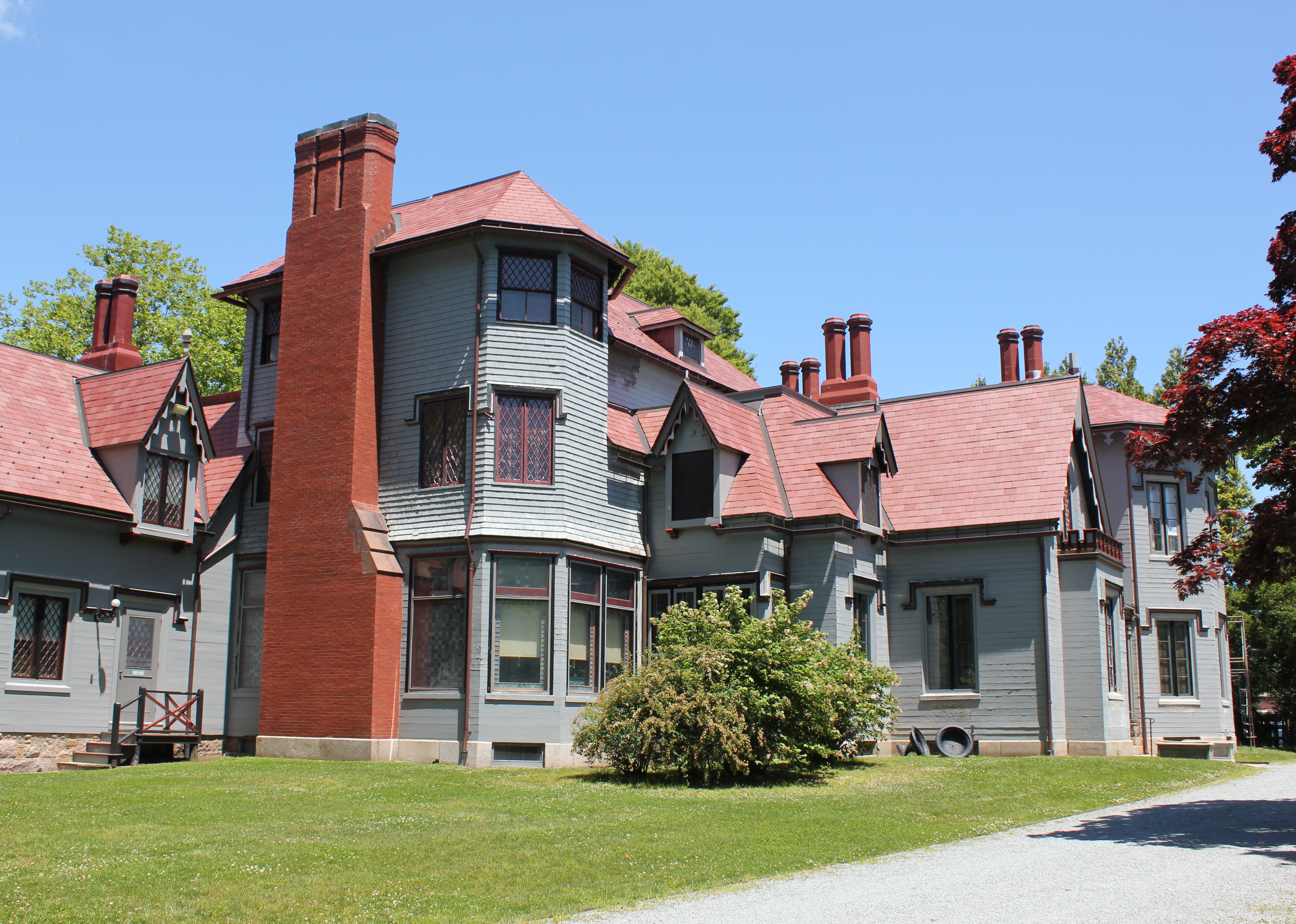
- View of house from southeast, 2018

- Location within Rhode Island Location within the United States
- Location: Bellevue Ave. and Bowery St., Newport, Rhode Island, USA
- Coordinates: 41°28′53.47″N 71°18′32.62″W
- Area: less than one acre
- Built: 1839
- Architect: Richard Upjohn
- Part of: Bellevue Avenue Historic District (ID72000023)
- NRHP reference No.: 73000058

Significant dates
- Added to NRHP: May 17, 1973
- Designated NHL: June 19, 1996
- Designated NHLDCP: December 8, 1972

Kingscote is a Gothic Revival mansion and house museum at Bowery Street and Bellevue Avenue in Newport, Rhode Island, designed by Richard Upjohn and built in 1839. As one of the first summer "cottages" constructed in Newport, it is now a National Historic Landmark. It was remodeled and extended by George Champlin Mason and later by Stanford White. It was owned by the King family from 1864 until 1972, when it was given to the Preservation Society of Newport County.

== History ==
Plan of the first floor

George Noble Jones owned the El Destino and Chemonie cotton plantations in Florida. He constructed this house along a farm path known as Bellevue Avenue. It was designed by Richard Upjohn and is an early example of the Gothic Revival style, with an irregular and busy roofline, with many gables and chimneys, and elaborate Gothic detailing. It is built of wood, although it was originally painted beige with sand mixed into the paint, giving it a textured appearance of sandstone.

The Jones family permanently left Newport at the outbreak of the American Civil War, and the house was sold to William Henry King in 1864, an Old China Trade merchant. King's nephew David leased the house in 1876 and embarked on a series of alterations. He hired Newport architect George Champlin Mason to build a larger dining room and to build a new service wing, and he had the interior redecorated by the New York firm of Leon Marcotte. He also introduced gas lighting to the premises.

In December 1880, David King hired Stanford White of McKim, Mead and White to design a new addition to the house, including new master bedrooms, a nursery, and a new dining room with opalescent glass bricks purchased from Louis Comfort Tiffany. These alterations greatly enlarged upon Upjohn's original design yet retained the fundamental Gothic Revival character of the building.

Kingscote is considered the building that started the fashion to build summer "cottages" in Newport. As more and more such dwellings were erected in Newport, they gradually became larger, and while Kingscote was considered the grandest building in Newport when it was built; compared to later ones, it is considered small.

The King family owned the house until 1972, when the last descendant bequeathed it to the Preservation Society. The bequest included all of the furnishings as of about 1880. Today, Kingscote is a National Historic Landmark (NHL) and a contributing property to the Bellevue Avenue Historic District, also an NHL.

Kingscote was featured in the second season of the HBO television series The Gilded Age to represent the earlier, smaller, era and to provide contrast to what "cottages" had become once the Gilded Age was in full swing: opulent palaces such as the Breakers, Marble House, and Rosecliff. As set designer Bob Shaw said, "Kingscote was once considered the grandest mansion in Newport in the 1850s, but by later standards, it’s actually rather small."

== Gallery ==
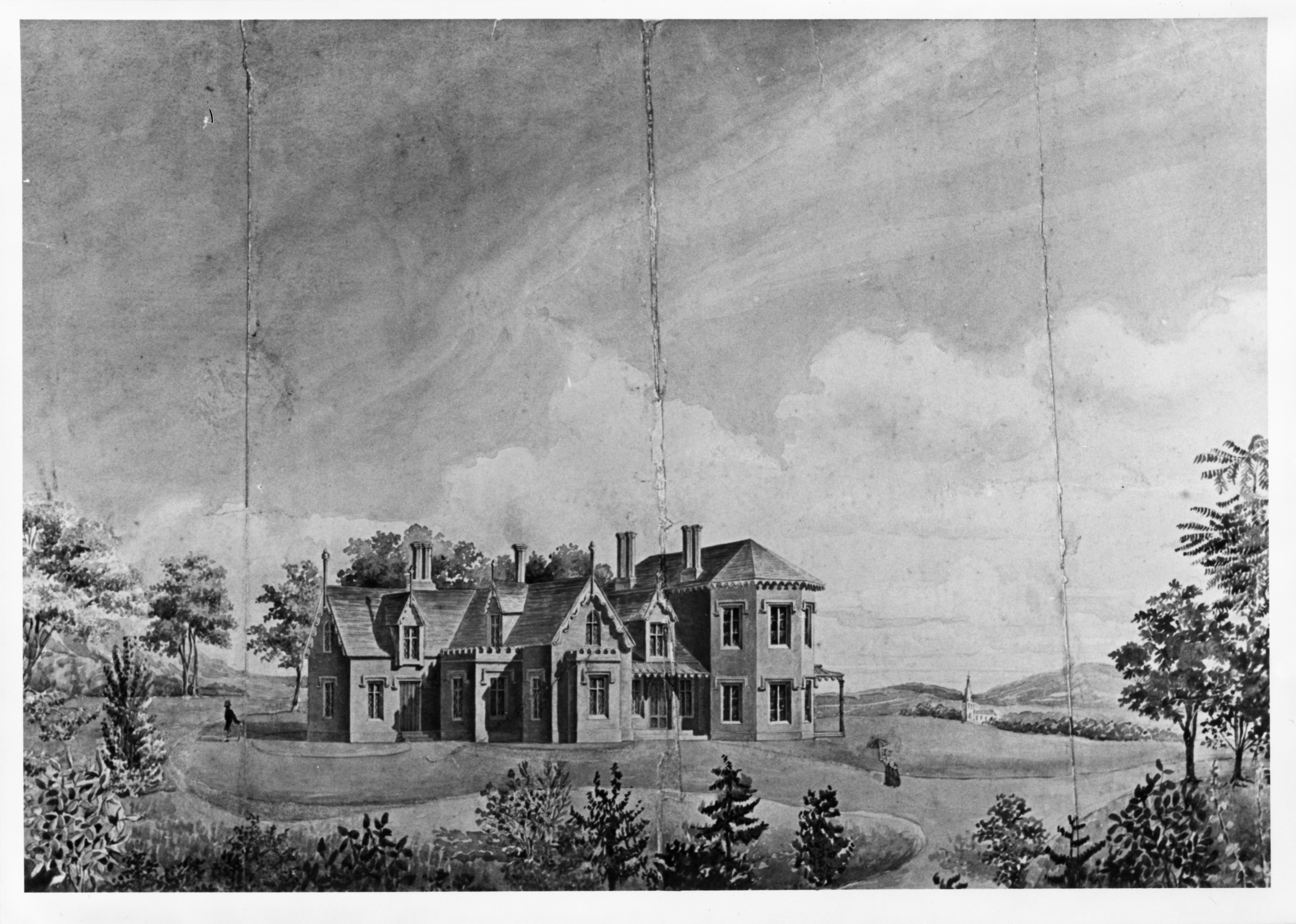
Richard Upjohn's original 1839 watercolor of Kingscote, as seen from the southwest.

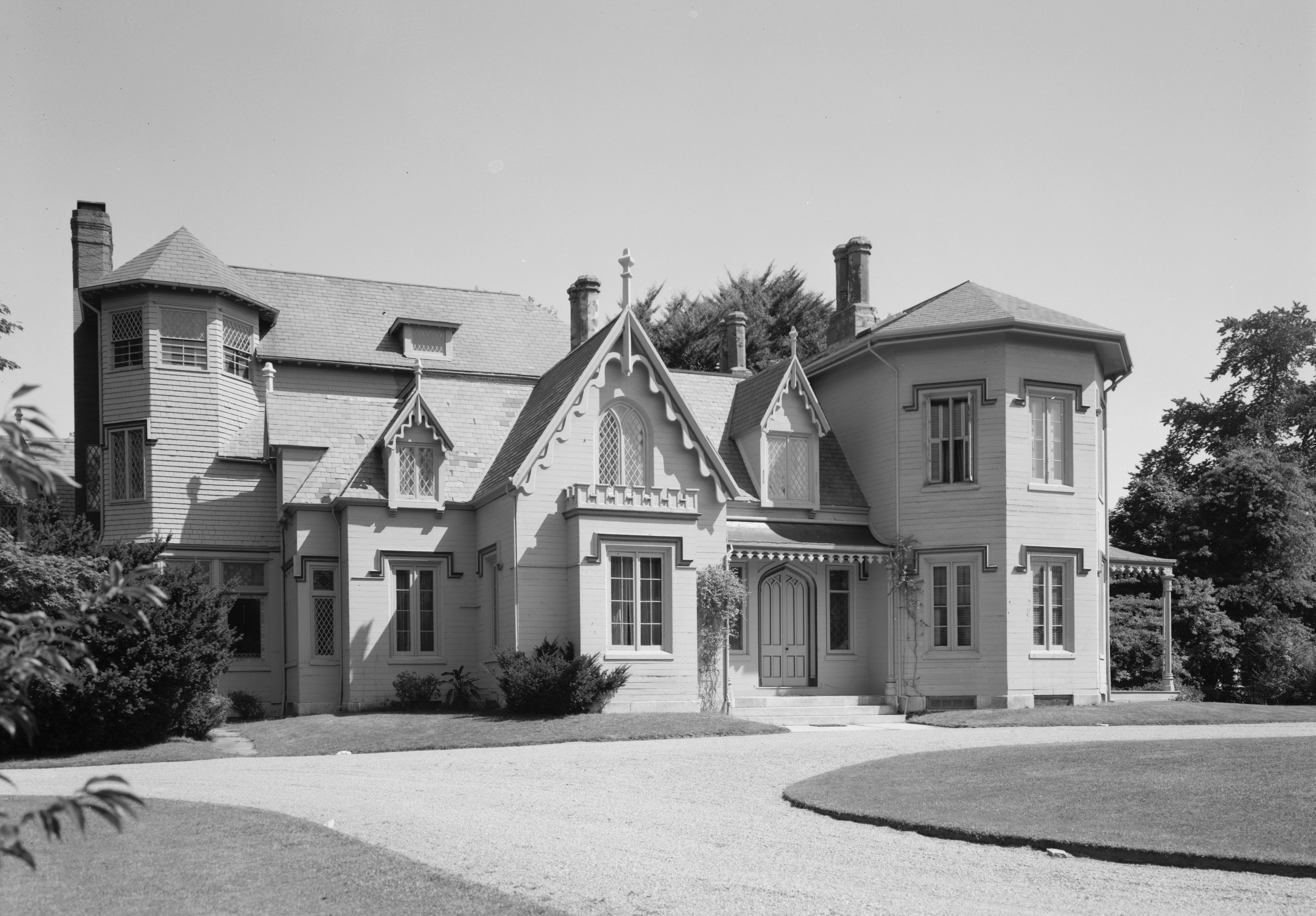
HABS photo of the front (southern) elevation.

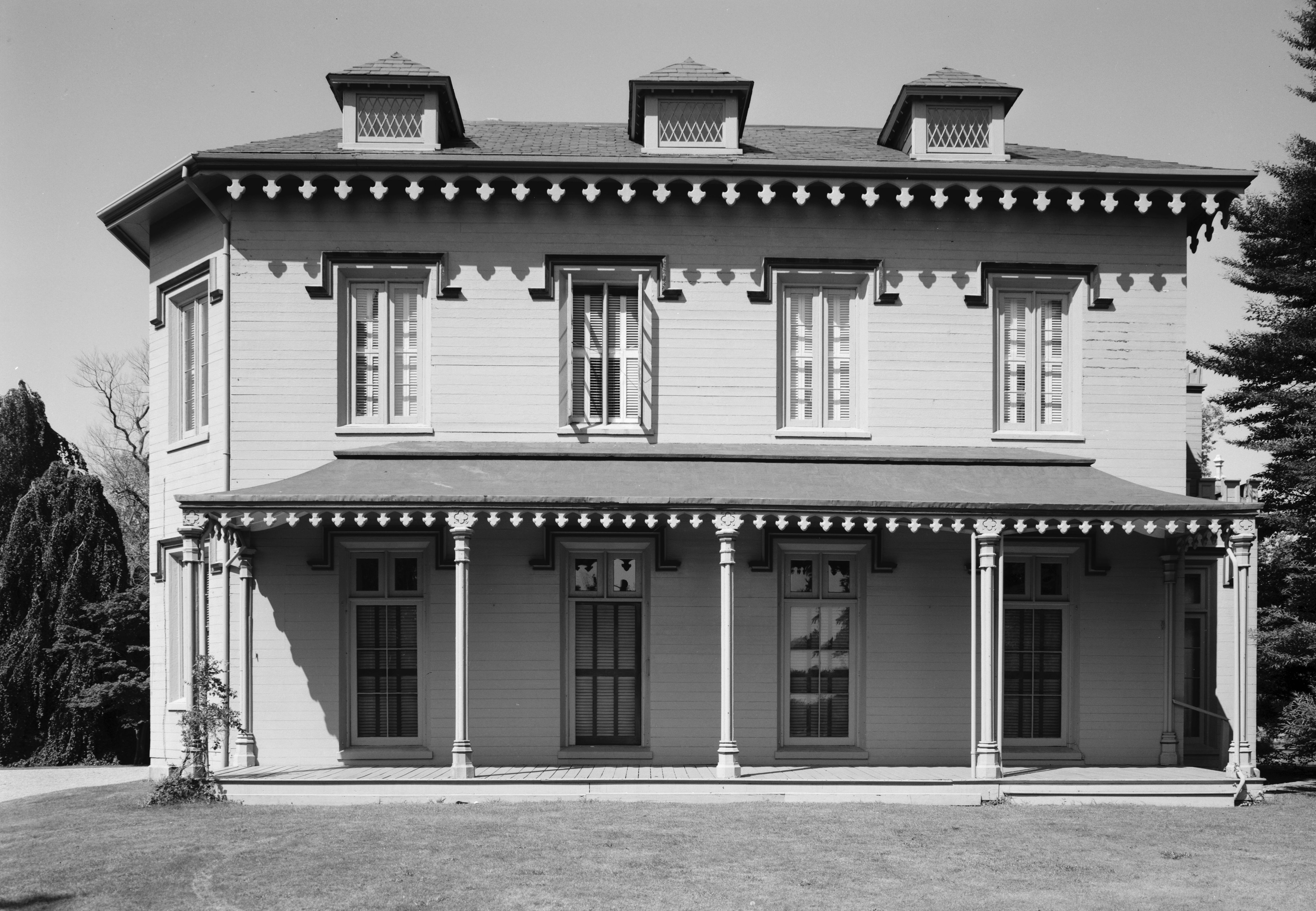
The eastern elevation.

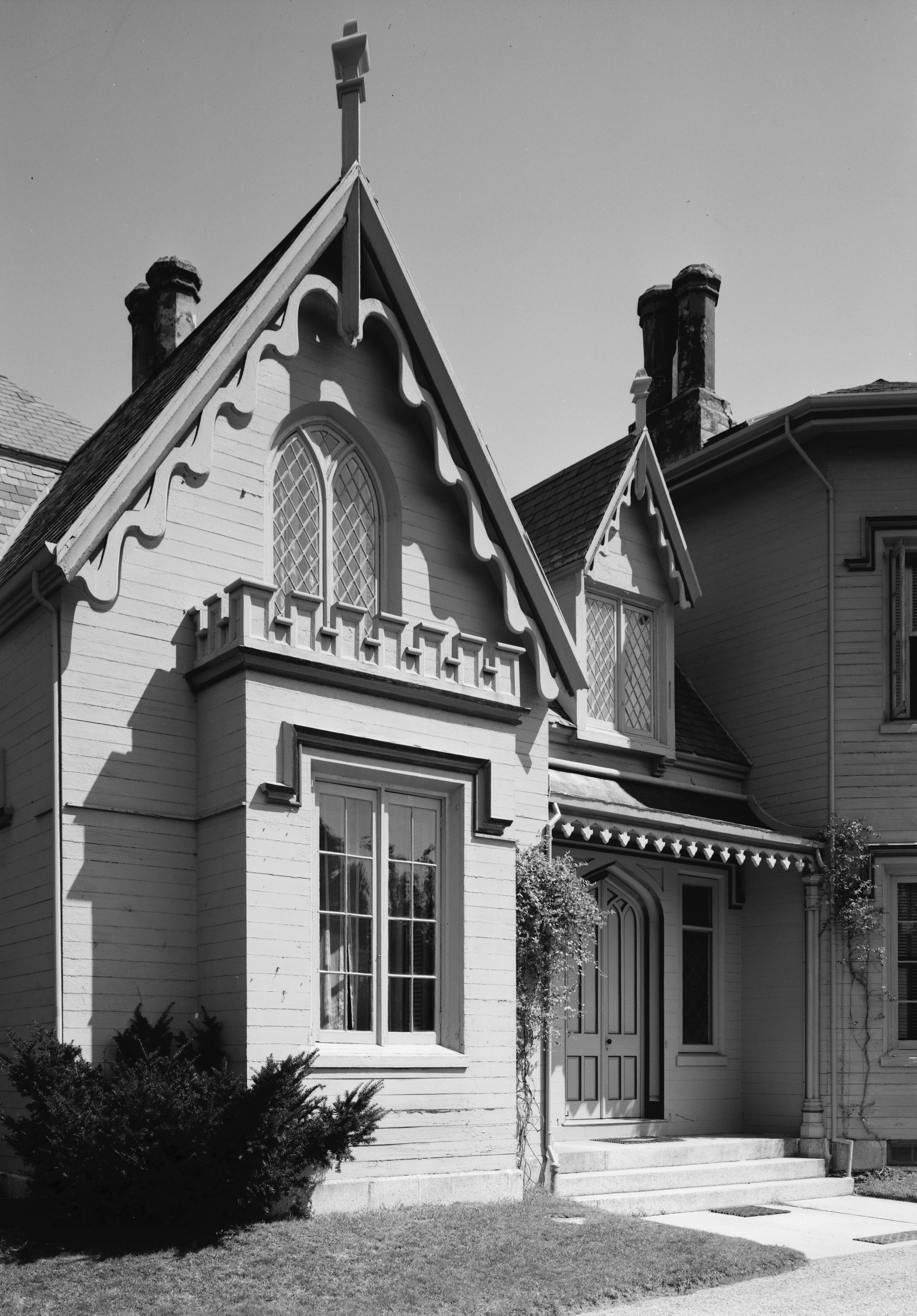
A detail of the front entrance.

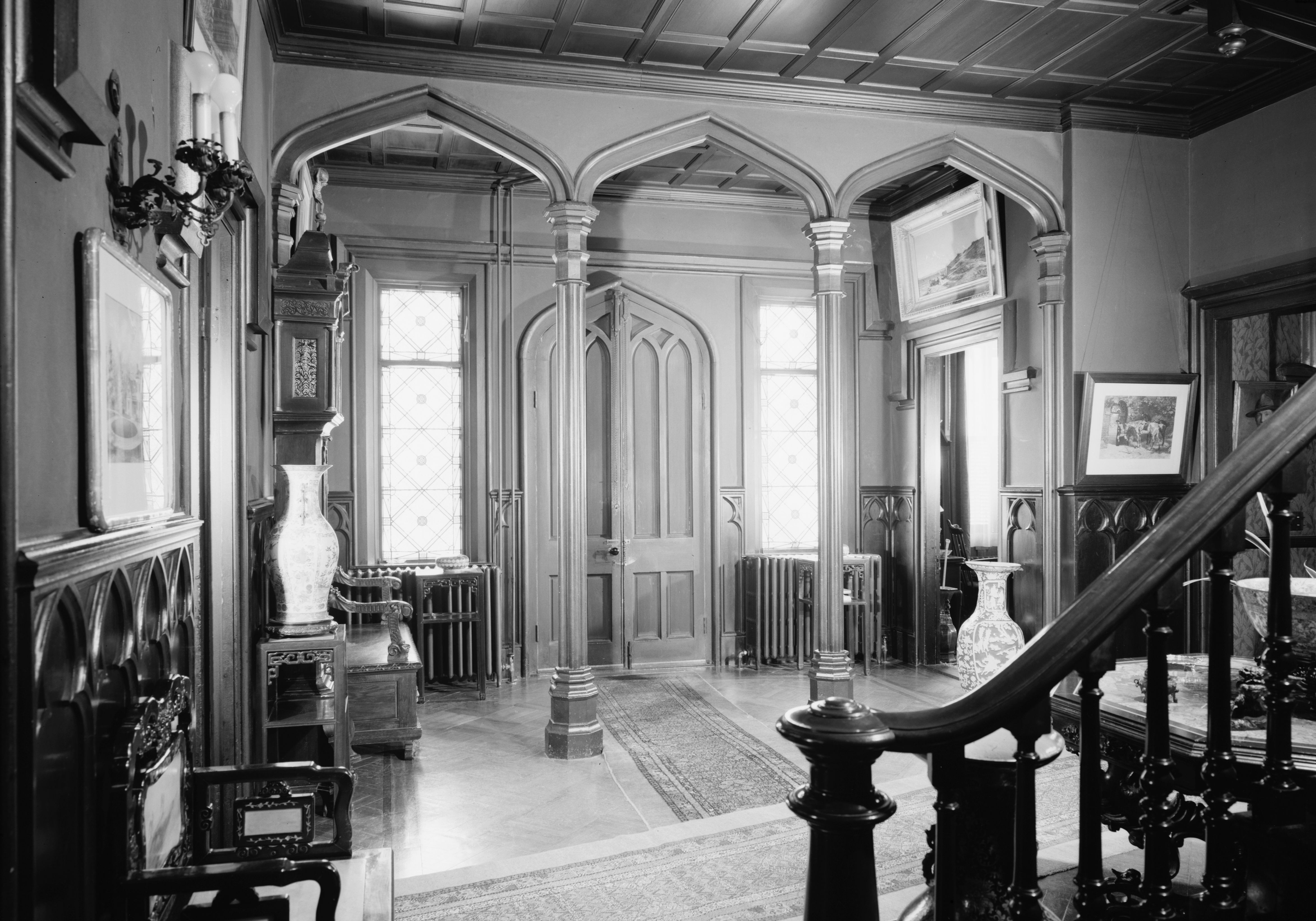
The entrance hall.

== See also ==
- List of National Historic Landmarks in Rhode Island
- National Register of Historic Places listings in Newport County, Rhode Island
