= Mistletoe Plantation =

Former quail hunting plantation in the US

Coordinates: 30.6120°N 84.2948°W

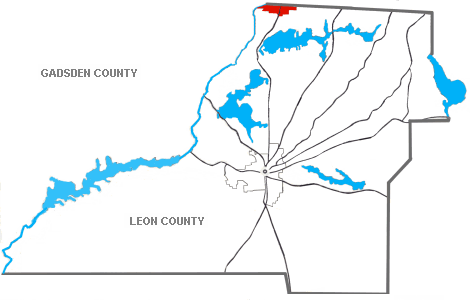
Location of Mistletoe Plantation in 1947

Mistletoe Plantation was a quail hunting plantation located in extreme northwest Leon County, Florida, and southeast Grady County, Georgia, established by Mrs. Jean Hanna Gallien.

Mistletoe Plantation lies mostly in Grady County, Georgia, with 2,500 acres (10 km^{2}) in Leon County.

== Owner ==
Mrs. Jean Hanna Gallien was the granddaughter of Melvin Hanna of M. A. Hanna Company, a mining and steel company. Mistletoe is near her grandfather's Melrose Plantation and Sinkhola Plantation owned by her sister Mrs. Warren Bicknell, Jr.

Mistletoe continues to be a conservation easement for Tall Timbers Research Station and Land Conservancy.
