= Tuscawilla Plantation =

Cotton plantation in Florida, United States

Coordinates: 30.4830°N 84.0869°W

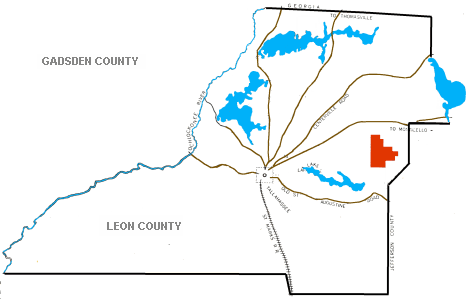
Location of Tuscawilla Plantation.

Tuscawilla Plantation was a large forced-labor farm growing cotton on 3,000 acres (1,200 ha) located in eastern Leon County, Florida, United States established by George W. Parkhill.

== Location ==
Tuscawilla Plantation bordered the northern tip of the south tract of Chemonie Plantation. Today, the land that was Tuscawilla is now the neighborhoods east of Chaires Cross Road and the north and south sides of Buck Lake Road, much of Baum Road, north and south sides of I-10, including Heartwood Hills, Tung Grove Road, Pennewaw Trace, and Bexhill Lane.

== Plantation specifics ==
The Leon County Florida 1860 Agricultural Census shows that the William Bailey Plantation had the following:

- Improved Land: 1,500 acres (610 ha)
- Unimproved Land: 1,500 acres (610 ha)
- Cash value of plantation: $36,000
- Cash value of farm implements/machinery: $1500
- Cash value of farm animals: $10,000
- Number of slaves: 172
- Bushels of corn: 3000
- Bales of cotton: 200

== The owner ==
John Parkhill was a physician by trade and a native of Ireland and left Richmond, Virginia on April 15, 1827, with his brother-in-law William Copland in a stagecoach headed south. Parkhill left his wife and 2-year-old son behind. Parkhill and Copland headed to Florida to examine and purchase land. Parkhill worked as a postmaster and banker in Tallahassee.

Parkhill joined the Confederate Army August 20, 1861 as a captain and died at the Seven Days Battle near Gaines' farm and Richmond, Virginia between June 25, 1862, and July 1, 1862.
