= Ingleside Plantation =

Plantation in Florida, United States

Coordinates: 30.5604°N 84.0139°W

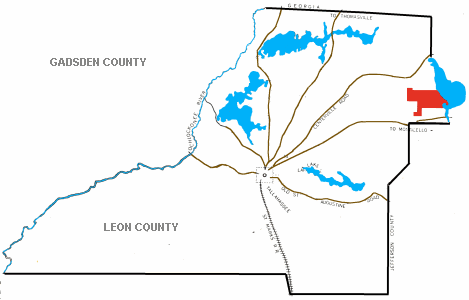
Location of the Blakely Plantation and Ingleside Plantation

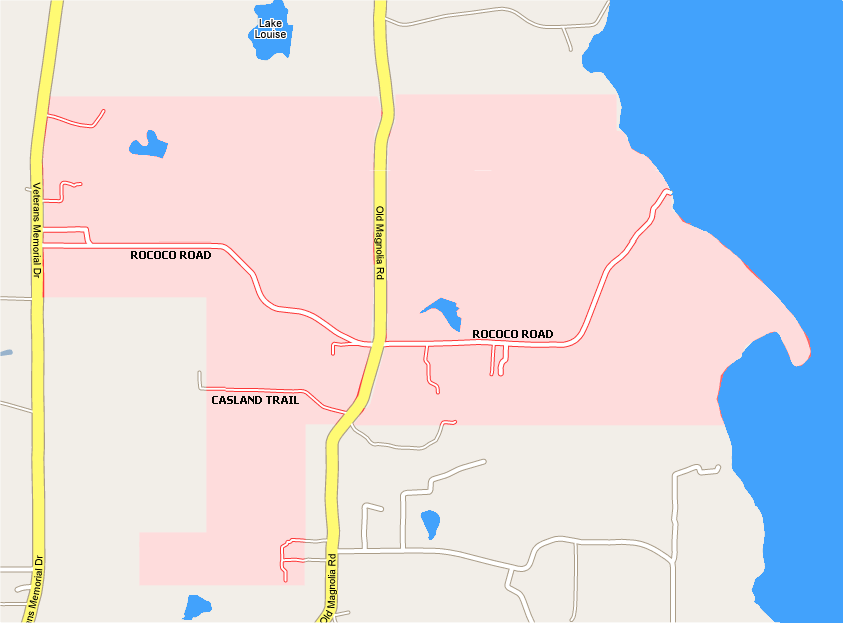
Where Blakely & Ingleside plantations would be today.

Ingleside Plantation was a forced-labor farm of 2,620 acres (1,060 ha) located in extreme northeast Leon County, Florida and established by Robert W. Alston and his family. Eventually, the property was acquired by Joel C. Blake. In 1860, Blake was enslaving 116 people to work his land, which was mostly devoted to producing cotton as a cash crop.

Blake, who was 29 years old in 1860, married Laura Parish, some relation to his mother. He founded Ingleside Plantation by purchasing land to the east of Blakely Plantation. Blake later joined the Confederate States Army and was killed on July 2, 1863, at the Battle of Gettysburg.

Ingleside would later become Ring Oak Plantation, a private hunting plantation co-owned by David Sinton Ingalls and Robert Livingston Ireland, Jr.

== Location ==
Ingleside was bounded on the east by the shores of Lake Miccosukee and would have been bound on the west by Blake's mother's Blakely Plantation. Today, the land is County Road 59 (Veterans Memorial Drive). Ingleside's northern boundary would now be Cypress Landing Road and to the south it would have bounded by the streets of Leland Circle and Indigo Lane.

== Plantation statistics ==
The Leon County Florida 1860 Agricultural Census shows that the Blakely Plantation had the following:

- Improved Land: 1,500 acres (610 ha)
- Unimproved Land: 1,140 acres (460 ha)
- Cash value of plantation: $25,000
- Cash value of farm implements/machinery: $1200
- Cash value of farm animals: $5,000
- Number of enslaved: 116
- Bushels of corn: 7000
- Bales of cotton: 181
