= Tall Timber =

Tall Timber may refer to:

- Tall Timber (1928 film), a 1928 silent animated short film
- Tall Timber (1926 film), a 1926 Australian silent film
- Park Avenue Logger, also known as Tall Timber, a 1937 film
- Tall Timber, Colorado, United States

== See also ==
- Tall Timbers (disambiguation)
