= Miccosukee Methodist Church =

- U.S. National Register of Historic Places
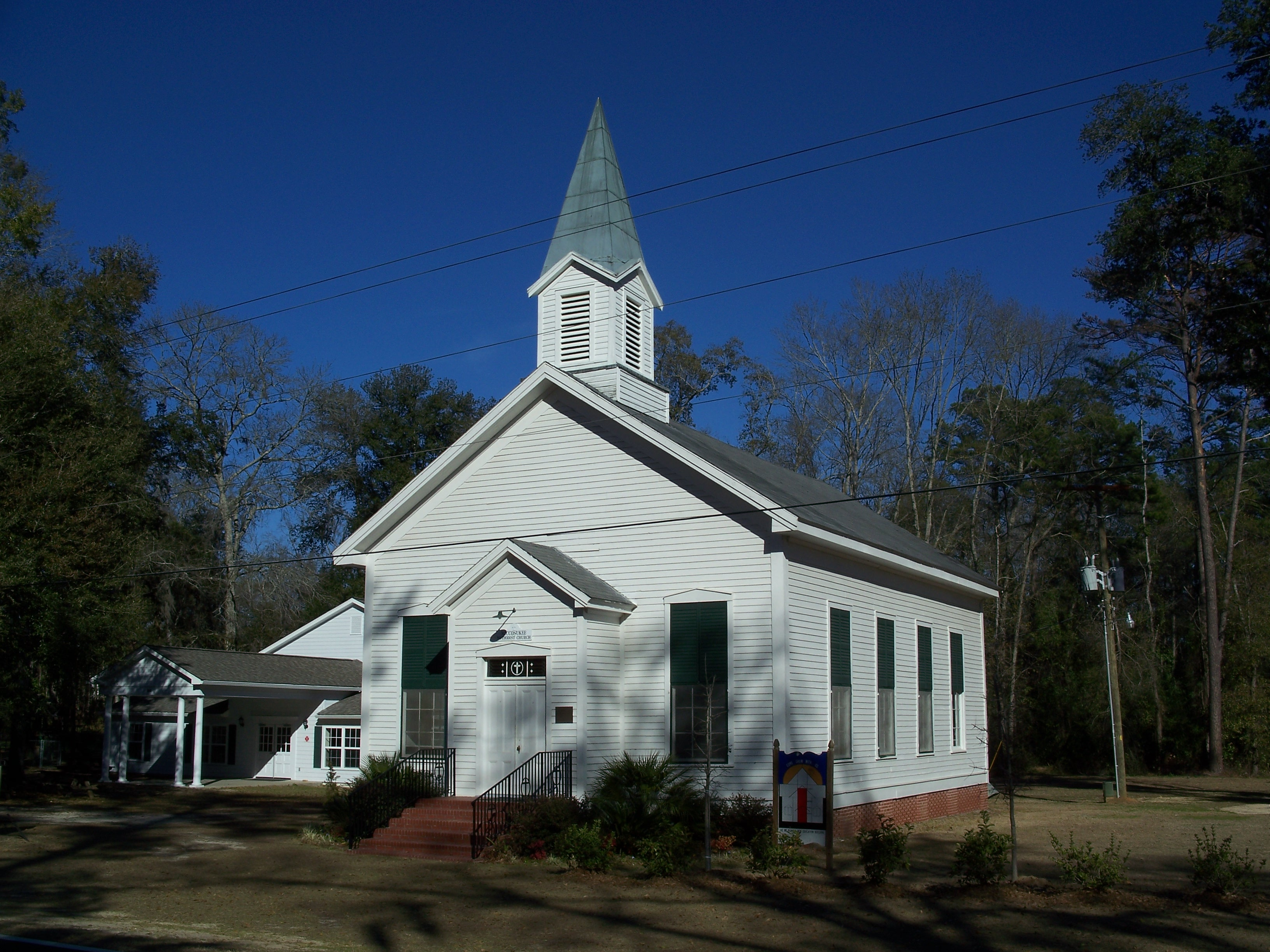

- Location within Florida Location within the United States
- Location: Miccosukee, Florida
- Coordinates: 30°35′36″N 84°2′28″W
- NRHP reference No.: 96000695
- Added to NRHP: June 28, 1996

The Miccosukee Methodist Church (also known as the Miccosukee United Methodist Church or Concord Methodist Episcopal Church) is a historic church in Miccosukee, Florida. It is located on County Road 59, south of the junction with State Road 151. On June 28, 1996, it was added to the U.S. National Register of Historic Places.
