= Chemonie Plantation =

Forced-labor farm in Florida, United States

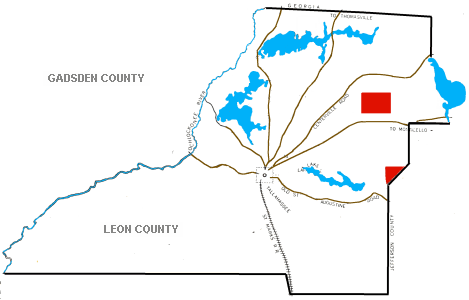
Location of Chemonie Plantation

Chemonie Plantation was a forced-labor farm of 1,840 acres (740 ha) in northern Leon County, Florida, United States, established by Hector Braden. By 1860, 64 enslaved people worked the land, which was primarily used to produce cotton as a cash crop.

== Location ==
Chemonie Plantion was situated on two separate tracts of land. The first tract was located between Centerville Road and the Monticello Road occupying a large amount of land. The second tract was south and slightly east. It was on the Leon County/Jefferson County line.

Adjacent plantations:

- Evergreen Hills Plantation to the west
- Tuscawilla Plantation to the north.

== The owners ==
- Hector Braden.
- In 1811, George Noble Jones was born to Noble Wimberly Jones and Sarah (Fenwick) Jones. Jones was from a long line of wealthy colonial men. His forefather, Noble Jones established Wormsloe Plantation near Savannah, Georgia. On May 18, 1840, Noble married Mary Savage Nuttall and purchased Chemonie as well as the Nuttall's El Destino Plantation. He spent the summer months at his Kingscote Mansion in Newport, Rhode Island, until the Civil War.

== Plantation statistics ==
The Leon County Florida 1860 Agricultural Census shows that the Chemonie Plantation had the following:

- Improved Land: 1,000 acres (400 ha)
- Unimproved Land: 840 acres (340 ha)
- Cash value of plantation: $18,400
- Cash value of farm implements/machinery: $1300
- Cash value of farm animals: $2,608
- Number of enslaved persons: 64
- Bushels of corn: 5000
- Bales of cotton: 200

== 20th century ==
Around 1945, David S. Ingalls, a director of Pan Am World Airways and publisher of Cincinnati Times-Star with Robert Livingston Ireland, Jr. an executive with M.A. Hanna Company, a coal company, purchased Chemonie Plantation, a quail hunting plantation, which became part of the Ireland-Ingalls ownership, a joint business concern. Aside from quail, Chemonie shared 1,000 acres (400 ha) of land in corn production.
