= Avient Corporation =

US manufacturer of specialized polymers

- Formerly: PolyOne Corporation (2000–2020)
- Type: Public
- Traded as: NYSE: AVNT; S&P 400 component
- Industry: Plastics
- Founded: August 31, 2000; 26 years ago
- Headquarters: Avon Lake, Ohio, U.S.
- Key people: Mike Frank, CEO
- Products: Specialty polymer materials and compounds
- Revenue: ▲US$3.28 billion (2023)
- Number of employees: 9,200 (2025)
- Website: avient.com

Avient Corporation is a global materials solutions company headquartered in Avon Lake, Ohio, United States, employing approximately 9,000 people worldwide. Its products include colorants, advanced composites, functional additives and engineered materials.

== History ==
PolyOne logo

PolyOne was formed on August 31, 2000 from the consolidation of The Geon Company (Geon) and M.A. Hanna Company (Hanna). The merger between M.A. Hanna Company and The Geon Company in 2000 produced PolyOne Corporation. In 2009, PolyOne was ranked #731 on the Fortune 1000 list and included in the S&P 600 investment index.

Hanna was formed in 1885 as a privately held company focused on mining and shipping and became publicly held in 1927. In the mid-1980s, Hanna began to divest its historic mining and shipping businesses to focus on polymers. Hanna purchased its first polymer company in 1986.

Geon's roots date back to 1927 when BFGoodrich scientist Waldo Semon produced the first usable vinyl polymer, marketed under the trade name "Geon". In 1933, Waldo Semon was granted US Patent for PVC (U.S. Patent No. 1929453), and in 1948, BFGoodrich created a vinyl plastic division that was subsequently spun off through a public offering in 1993, creating Geon as a separate publicly held company.

In October 2019, PolyOne sold its performance products and solutions business unit, renamed to GEON Performance Solutions, to SK Capital.

In 2020, PolyOne acquired a division of Clariant and rebranding to the name Avient, and in 2021 acquired Magna Colours Ltd. for $48 million.

In April 2022, Avient Corporation has entered into an agreement with Royal DSM to purchase the DSM Protective Materials business for a purchase price of $1.485B.
