= George H. Love =

American businessman and industrialist

George Love
- Born: George H. Love; September 4, 1900; Pennsylvania
- Died: July 25, 1991 (aged 90)
- Education: Phillips Exeter Academy; Princeton University; Harvard University
- Occupations: businessman; industrialist
- Years active: 1926–1972
- Employers: Consolidation Coal Company; Chrysler Corporation

George H. Love (September 4, 1900 – July 25, 1991) was an American businessman and industrialist, who was in control of two major corporations—the Consolidation Coal Company and the Chrysler Corporation—and lead both back to profitability.

== Early life ==
Love was born in Pennsylvania. He attended Phillips Exeter Academy and Princeton University, and then, unable to immediately find work, became a miner and overseer in one of his family's coal mines. Later, he went on to get his MBA from Harvard University. and spent two years as a broker in the investment field before an uncle put him in charge of three family-owned coal mines in Pennsylvania. Also during this time he was active in other areas—in 1926, he was a vice-president of Pittsburgh Union collieries, and in 1933 he became president.

== Consolidation Coal Company ==
After Love was able to turn things around at the first three mines, Love took control of his uncle's struggling Consolidation Coal Company in total in the year 1944. He turned things around by a series of mergers and acquisitions, through which he was able to broaden the economies of scale. His mergers, with Pittsburgh Coal and the M. A. Hanna Company, end up creating (at the time) the country's largest coal company. His process improvements included focusing on industrial sales rather than private distribution, major changes in the safety requirements of coal mining, removing primitive implements such as mules and picks with modern mechanical equipment. He left the helm in 1956.

== Union Efforts ==
Love was well known for his even-handed and fair negotiations with union leader John Lewis and the United Mine Workers group. After his retirement, he was a chief negotiator for the coal industry as a whole with labor, leading to a 13-year period of labor peace.

== Chrysler Corporation ==
Love's coal companies were heavily invested in Chrysler and in 1958, he was elected to the company's board of directors. He joined the company at a time of lagging sales. In 1961, Love became Chrysler's chairman of the board and chief policy officer after Lester Lum Colbert resigned due to a conflict of interest scandal. Love worked part-time while company president Lynn A. Townsend, who had been picked by Love, served as the company's chief administrative officer. Chrysler rebounded under Love and Townsend. Its market share grew from 7.3% in 1962 to 16.7% in 1966. Love stepped down as chairman in 1966, but remained on the board until 1972.

He died, due to complications from emphysema, in 1991.

== Interests ==
Love purchased a section of Walter Evans Edge's Sunny Hill Plantation in Leon County, Florida and named it Loveridge Plantation. Love used this for quail hunting.

Business positions
Preceded by Lester Lum Colbert	Chairman of the Chrysler Corporation; September 21, 1961–December 1, 1966	Succeeded by Lynn A. Townsend
