= Strickland-Herold House =

Historic house in Florida, United States

- U.S. National Register of Historic Places
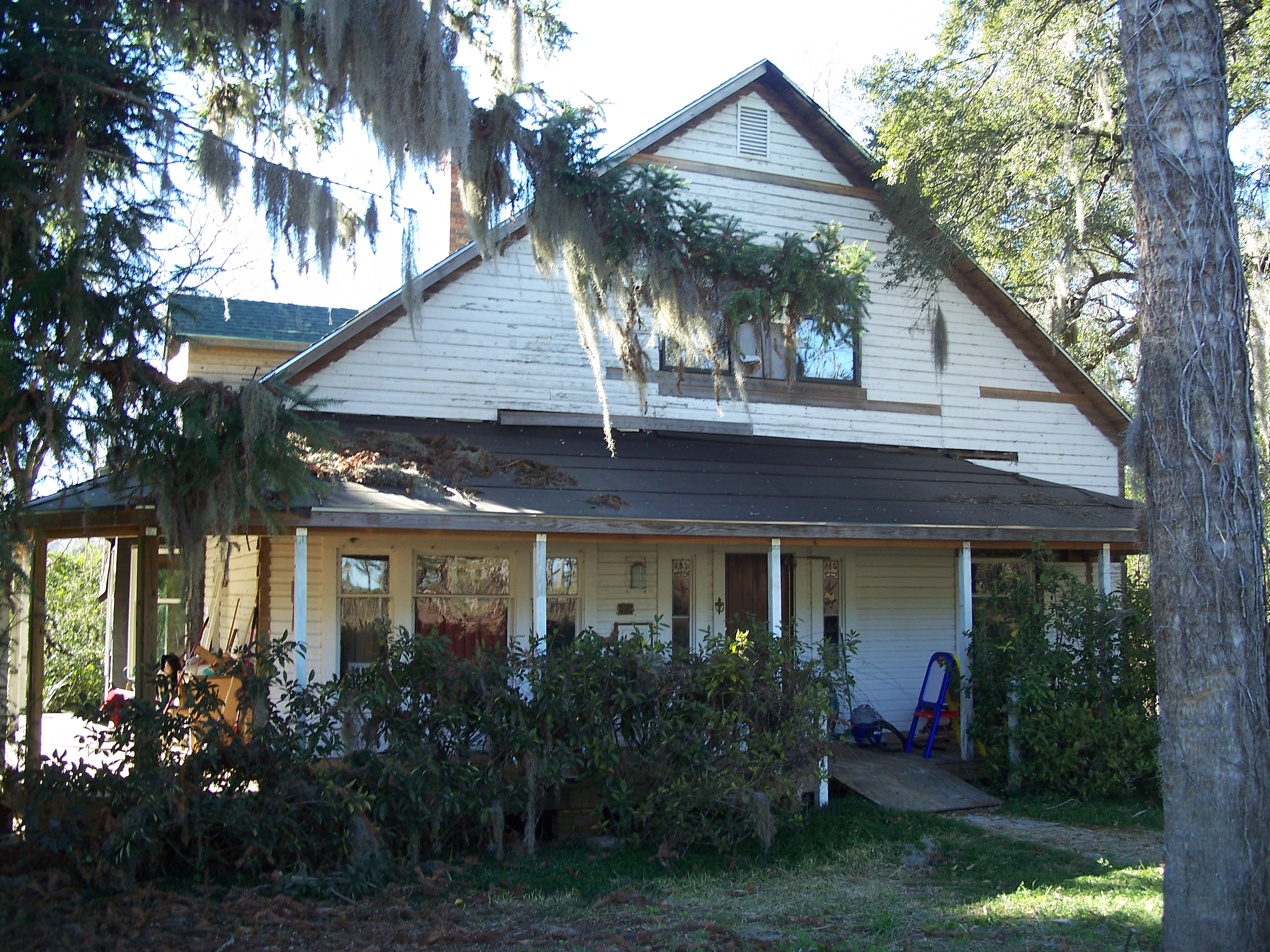

- Location within Florida Location within the United States
- Location: Miccosukee, Leon County, Florida
- Coordinates: 30°35′45″N 84°02′29″W
- NRHP reference No.: 96001523
- Added to NRHP: January 9, 1997

The Strickland-Herold House is a historic home in Miccosukee, Florida, United States. It is located at Main Street, northwest of junction of Moccasin Gap Road and State Road 59. On January 9, 1997, it was added to the U.S. National Register of Historic Places.
