= George Noble Jones =

American southern plantation owner

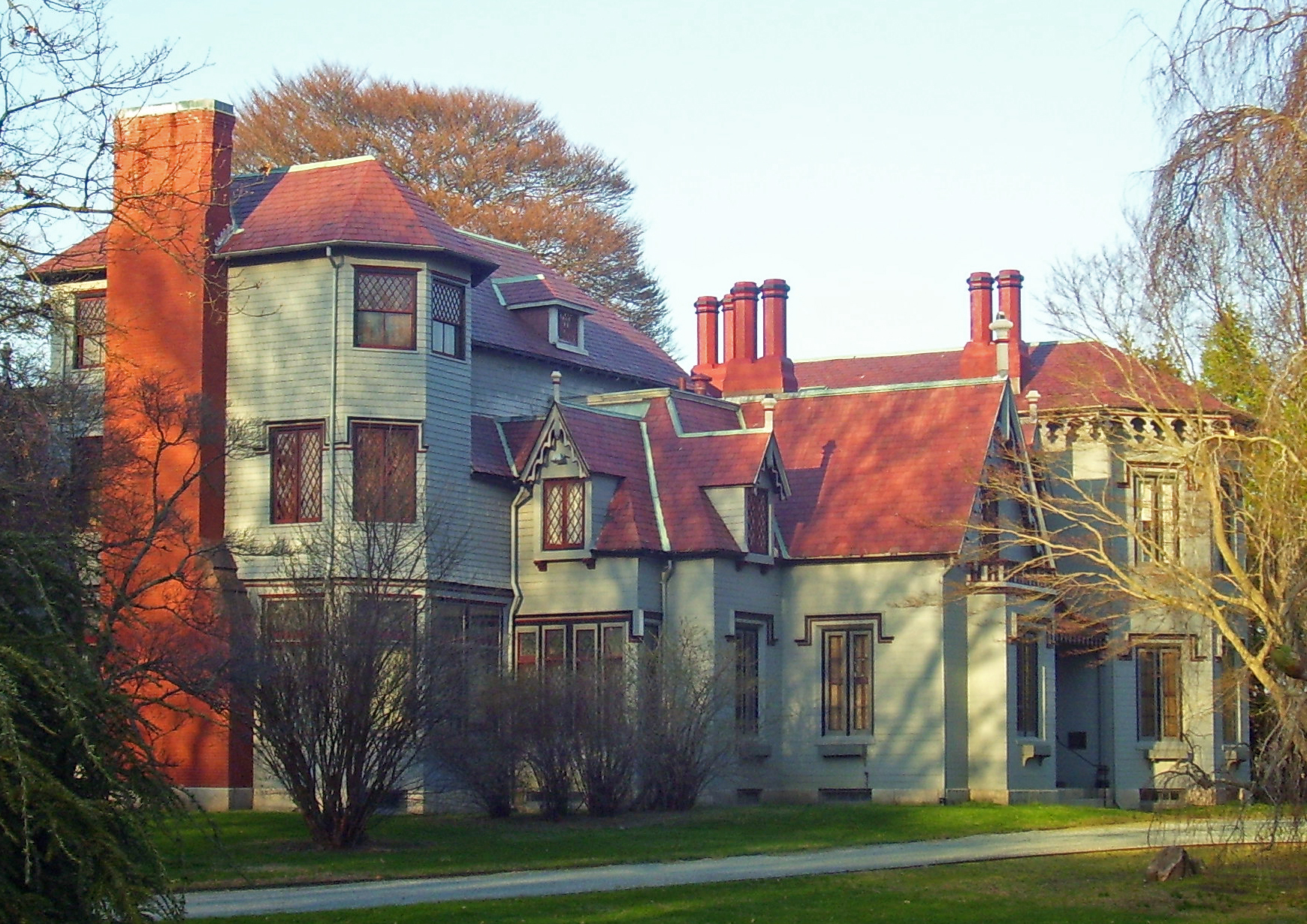
Jones' home in Newport, Kingscote

George Noble Jones (1811–1876) was a wealthy American southern plantation owner who owned the El Destino Plantation and Chemonie Plantation. In 1839 he hired English architect Richard Upjohn to build a house on 253 Bellevue Avenue in Newport, Rhode Island. Upjohn had earlier designed a Maine house for Jones' relatives. This house, one of the earliest summer "cottages" in Newport, was in 1863 renamed Kingscote by new owners. Kingscote, a classic Gothic Revival building, is now a National Historic Landmark and was added to the National Register of Historic Places in 1973.

George Noble Jones was born in 1811 to Noble Wimberley Jones (1784–1818) and Sarah (Fenwick Campbell) Jones (1784–1843), families with a long colonial heritage. His ancestor, Noble Jones, established Wormsloe Plantation near Savannah, Georgia. On May 18, 1840, Jones married Mary Wallace Savage (Nuttall) (1812–1869), mother of Mary Nuttall De Renne, and purchased Chemonie as well as the Nuttall's El Destino Plantation. Jones was one of the first members of the elite gentlemen's club, the Newport Reading Room. When the Civil War broke out, he permanently left Newport and the North, returning to El Destino.

George Noble Jones died in 1876 in Jefferson, Florida.
