= El Destino Plantation =

El Destino Plantation was a large forced-labor farm of 7,638 acres (30.91 km^{2}) located in western Jefferson County and eastern Leon County, Florida, United States established by John Nuttall in 1828. It was worked by enslaved African Americans (prior to the end of the American Civil War).

== Location ==
El Destino was located in western Jefferson County near present-day Waukeenah. It extended into Leon County, Florida by 6 miles (9.7 km) and 3 miles (4.8 km) south of the W.G. Ponder Plantation.

== Plantation history ==
The land to become El Destino was purchased from the U.S. government in 1828. In 1832 William B. Nuttall bought El Destino from his father’s estate for $17,000 (~$586,033 in 2024). Nutall died leaving the property to his widow, Mary Savage Nuttall. Mary Nuttall would inherit enslaved people from her uncle, William Savage. In order to effectively exploit the labour of these enslaved people, Hector Braden, a friend of William’s, sold Mary Chemonie Plantation 6 miles (9.7 km) north of El Destino. On May 18, 1840 George Noble Jones married Mary Savage Nuttall and purchased El Destino.

The plantation house was a large home and was destroyed by fire in 1925.

=== Owners ===
- John Nuttall was a wealthy planter from Virginia and later North Carolina.
- William B. Nuttall, son of John Nuttall. William had a law office in Tallahassee and was a speculator in Florida lands and bank stocks. John died from a stroke on April 20, 1836.
- George Noble Jones married Mary Nuttall and purchased El Destino as well as Chemonie Plantation in Leon County. George was well-acquainted with plantation management having managed a plantation in Jefferson County owned by his mother and two aunts. Jones would inherit part of this plantation as well as considerable wharf and mercantile property in Savannah, Georgia, bank stock and other investments. Jones would become an absentee planter preferring to spend his winter months in Savannah and the summer months in Newport, Rhode Island, where he owned a mansion called Kingscote until the Civil War.

El Destino remained in the Jones family until 1919. It was then sold for $70,000 but kept its name. In 1937 it was purchased by Sheldon Whitehouse of New York.

In 1854 D.N. Moxley served as an overseer for the property when a complaint was lodged against him for mistreating the workers under his supervision.
