= Averett =

Averett may refer to:

== People with the surname ==
- Anthony Averett (born 1994), American football player
- Marquese Averett, American politician
- Thomas H. Averett (1800–1855), 19th century U.S. legislator

== Institutions ==
- Averett University, private college in Danville, Virginia, United States
