= Dawn Averitt =

American HIV/AIDS treatment policy advocate and activist

Dawn Averitt (born 1968) is an American HIV/AIDS treatment policy advocate and activist.

== Activism ==
Averitt was diagnosed with HIV in 1988 at the age of 19, most likely acquired as a result of a rape she experienced living and modeling in Spain. She began her career working in the office of Senator Sam Nunn of Georgia from 1990 to 1993. Averitt started working for the AIDS Survival Project in 1993. She was an early advocate for women with HIV and for reducing stigma associated with the disease in order to improve access to care. In 1995, Averitt launched the Women's Information Service and Exchange (WISE) the first US-based organization to focus on HIV/AIDS treatment information and advocacy for women.

In 2000, Averitt completed a hike of the entire length of the Appalachian Trail called “Trekking with AIDS” to raise awareness about HIV and the reality that it can affect anyone, and to celebrate 12 years of successfully living with HIV. In 2001, Averitt decided to have children and in 2002 authored an article called "HIV and Pregnancy: Tough Choices and the Right to Choose" about her choice. In 2002 and 2004, Averitt delivered two healthy HIV negative children.

In 2002, she and her brother Richard co-founded The Well Project, a nonprofit organization that "works to improve the lives of women living with HIV and AIDS, and to change the course of the AIDS pandemic by focusing on treatment and prevention for women." Much of Averitt's work has focused on including women and people of color in research on HIV/AIDS and on advancements in HIV treatment and care. She founded a think tank in 2003 that became the Women's Research Initiative on HIV/AIDS (WRI). In 2003 she also received a Mothers and Shakers award from Redbook Magazine.

From 2006 to 2009 Averitt was a driving force behind the GRACE Study, the first HIV treatment study in the US to successfully enroll a majority of women. The GRACE Study helped show that HIV positive women and people of color will participate in clinical studies and that they experience different barriers to treatment than men.

In July 2007, Averitt received a Women Leading Global Change Award from the World YWCA for her leadership in the HIV and AIDS pandemic. In 2010, Averitt was named to the Presidential Advisory Committee on HIV/AIDS (PACHA). In 2012, she organized the first National HIV Awareness Month in the US to raise awareness of the ongoing epidemic in the US. More than 63,000 people signed a petition on the organization's website committing to help end AIDS in the US.

== Personal life ==
Dawn Averitt was born in Georgia in 1968 and now lives in Vermont with her partner and daughters.
