= Mistletoe, Kentucky =

Unincorporated community in Kentucky, United States

Mistletoe
- Unincorporated community
- Location within the state of Kentucky Mistletoe (the United States)
- Coordinates: 37°18′45″N 83°35′53″W
- Country: United States
- State: Kentucky
- County: Owsley
- Elevation: 866 ft (264 m)
- Time zone: UTC-5 (Eastern (EST))
  - Summer (DST): UTC-4 (EST)
- ZIP codes: 41351
- GNIS feature ID: 514032

Mistletoe is an unincorporated community located in Owsley County, Kentucky, United States. Its post office closed in January 2004. The community was named for the mistletoe native to the area.
