= Averitt-Herod House =

Historic house in Tennessee, United States

- Averitt--Herod House
- U.S. National Register of Historic Places
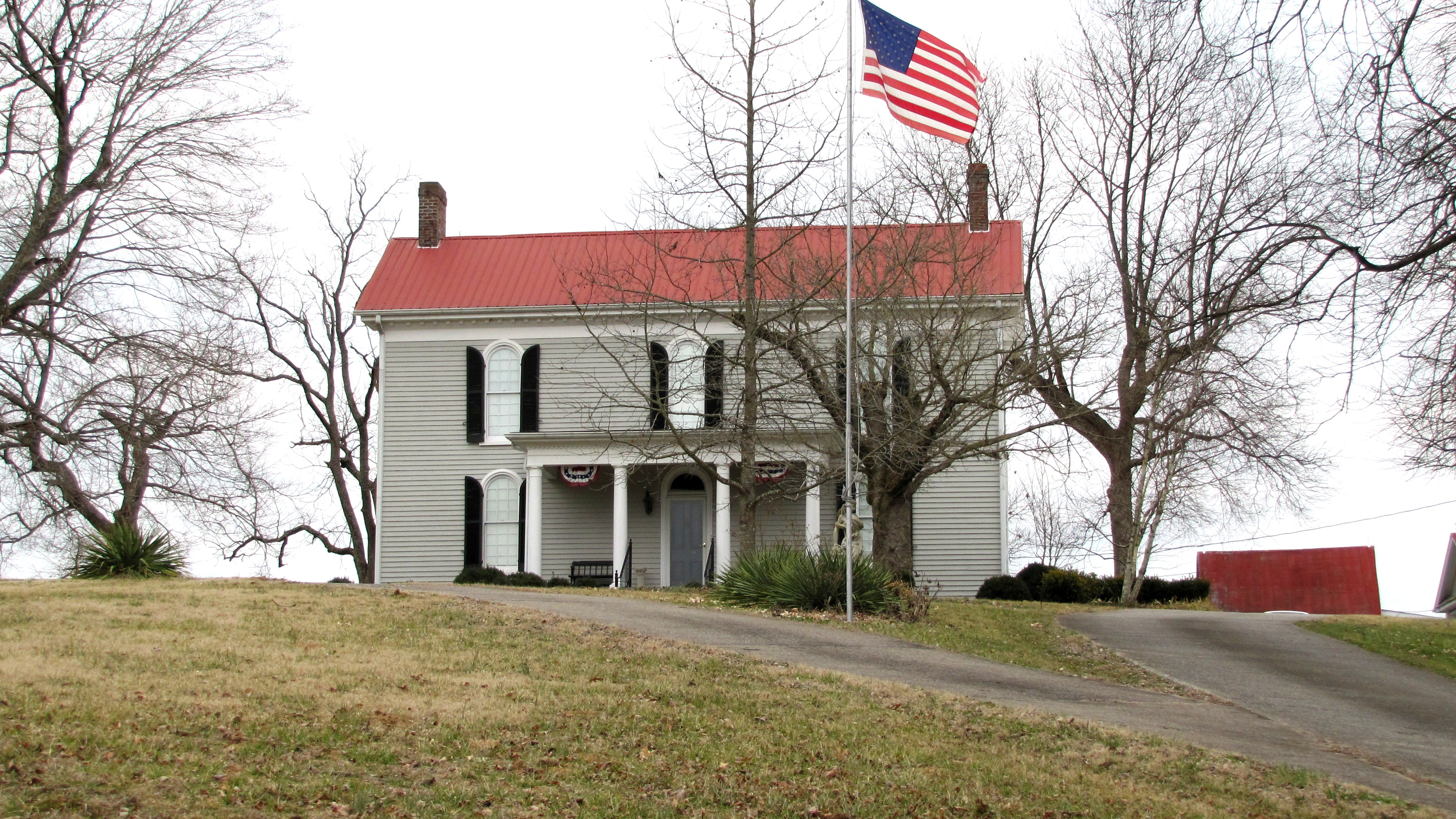
- The Averitt-Herod House in 2010

- Location within Tennessee
- Nearest city: Hartsville, Tennessee
- Coordinates: 36.37442°N 86.16297°W
- Area: 10 acres (4.0 ha)
- Built: 1834
- Architectural style: Federal, Greek Revival
- NRHP reference No.: 96000411
- Added to NRHP: April 12, 1996

The Averitt-Herod House is a historic mansion in Hartsville, Tennessee, United States. It was built for Peter Averitt, Sr. in 1834. It has been listed on the National Register of Historic Places since April 12, 1996.
