= Robert Livingston Ireland Jr. =

American businessman (1895–1981)

- Born: February 1, 1895; Cleveland, Ohio, U.S.
- Died: April 21, 1981 (aged 86)
- Education: University School; The Taft School; Asheville School
- Alma mater: Phillips Andover Academy; Yale University
- Spouses: Margaret Allen (m. 1918; died 1961) Louise Ireland Grimes (m. 1967)
- Children: 4
- Parent(s): Robert Livingston Ireland; Kate Benedict Harvey
- Relatives: Howard Melville Hanna (grandfather)

Robert Livingston Ireland Jr. (February 1, 1895 – April 21, 1981), nicknamed "Liv", was an American businessman, philanthropist, plantation owner, quail hunter, and yachtsman from Cleveland, Ohio.

== Early life ==
Ireland was born in Cleveland, Ohio on February 1, 1895. He was the son of Robert Livingston Ireland Sr. (1867–1928), a prominent Cleveland businessman, and Kate Benedict Ireland (1871–1936), who married in 1894. His sister, Elisabeth Ireland (known as "Miss Pansy"), was married to Parker Barrington Poe and inherited Pebble Hill Plantation, their maternal grandfather's estate in Thomasville, Georgia. His parents divorced in 1918; his father remarried to Esther Wood in 1920, and his mother remarried to Perry Williams Harvey.

His paternal grandfather was prominent lawyer, John Busteed Ireland, a grandson of Jonathan Lawrence of the Continental Army and of William Floyd, a signer of the Declaration of Independence. His paternal grandmother was Adelia Duane (née Pell) Ireland, the daughter of Maria Louisa (née Brinckerhoff) Pell and Robert Livingston Pell, a descendant of Robert Livingston the Elder, 1st Lord of Livingston Manor, and Thomas Pell, 1st Lord of the Pelham Manor.

He attended University School in Shaker Heights, Ohio and went on to prepare for college at The Taft School in Watertown, Connecticut. He graduated from Asheville School in North Carolina in 1914. From 1914 to 1915 he also attended Phillips Andover Academy followed by studying mining engineering at Yale University. He left Yale during World War I and enlisted in the Naval Reserve Flying Corps.

== Career ==
He had a long career with the M.A. Hanna Company founded by his maternal grandfather, Howard Melville Hanna, a brother of Marcus Alonzo Hanna, a U.S. senator from Ohio. He also had a long run with Consolidation Coal Company. From 1920 to 1924, he worked for Susquehanna Collieries Company, a subsidiary of Hanna Coal Company in Pennsylvania. In 1924, he returned to Cleveland and became an assistant to the general manager of SCC. He worked his way up in Hanna Coal and became manager in 1929 followed by president in 1931. When Consolidation Coal Company purchased Hanna Coal, he became chairman of the executive committee followed by vice-chairman of the board of directors. He retired in 1966.

=== Philanthropy ===
He was an active civic leader and active in politics serving on the board of directors of several organizations. He financially supported all the arts but disliked opera and classical music. His first wife and daughter Louise were great Opera enthusiasts. They promoted and supported the Metropolitan Opera's annual tour visit to Cleveland where Liv played to role of announcer bouncer at a high society reception before the opera. A few minutes prior to the start of the opera he would proceed through the reception with a loud noise maker telling everyone to head up to the auditorium. When the group had departed, he would retreat to a small office and work. He was a prominent figure in the local and state Republican Party and through his friend, Governor Jim Rhodes, funding was approved for The Ireland Cancer Center at University Hospitals in his memory.

Active in civic affairs, he served as president of the board of trustees of the Hawken School, Cleveland, and as a trustee of St. Timothy's School in Baltimore, Maryland. He was a member of the finance committee of the Day Nursery Association, chairman of the investment committee of the Visiting Nurse Association, and a member of the advisory committee on investments of the Benjamin Rose Institute, all in Cleveland. Additionally, he was a member of the board of governors of Western Reserve University, a trustee of the Cleveland Zoological Society, and chairman of the finance committee of the University Hospitals in Cleveland.

=== Plantations and sailing ===
He was an avid sportsman and with close friend David S. Ingalls (1899-1985) and the two co-owned two quail hunting plantations, Ring Oak Plantation and Foshalee Plantation in Leon County, Florida north of Tallahassee. They later divided the plantations with Ireland taking full ownership of Foshallee.

He was a sailing enthusiast with a series of boats named Pandora (I - IV) in which he cruised the east coast of the United States and the Bahamas from his residence in Pemaquid Harbor, Maine, and Nassau Harbor Club, in Nassau, Bahamas. He was a member of the Cruising Club of America and competed in the Bermuda Race many times. While in the Bahamas his local guide was Vivian Alvin (Old Pot) Pinder of Spanish Wells, reputed to be the greatest spear fisherman in the Bahamas.

== Personal life ==
On February 9, 1918, he was married to Margaret "Peg" Allen (1894–1961). Peg had been born in Chicago, raised in New York, and graduated from Brearley School. She helped organize the Western Reserve Women's Republican Club of Cuyahoga County, Ohio and from 1953 to 1957, she chaired the Cuyahoga County Republican Party's Women's Committee, and in 1952 and 1956, she was an alternate delegate to those Republican National Conventions. Together, Liv and Peg were the parents of four children:

- Louise Ireland (1918–2012), who married Gilbert W. Humphrey (1904–1982), who married in 1939.
- Robert Livingston "Tim" Ireland III (1920–2002), a banker with Brown Brothers Harriman & Co. who married Jacqueline Mayhew. After her death, he married Anne Sweetser. In 1977, his son, Thomas Ellis Ireland, married Nancy Suzanne Roosevelt, daughter of Franklin D. Roosevelt Jr. and granddaughter of President Franklin D. Roosevelt and Eleanor Roosevelt.
- Melville Hanna Ireland, an officer of the brokerage house, Blair & Co.
- Kate Ireland (1930–2011), a philanthropist who lived with her partner, Pamela Anne Cundle (1929–2011), at Foshalee Plantation.

Margaret died October 22, 1961. He later remarried to Mrs. Louise Davis (née Ireland) Grimes in 1967. They had no children. He died on April 21, 1981, and is buried in Lake View Cemetery.
