= Blakely Plantation =

Plantation in Florida, United States

Coordinates: 30.5573°N 84.0138°W

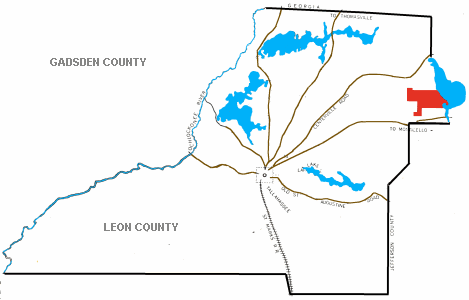
Location of the Blakely Plantation and Ingleside Plantation

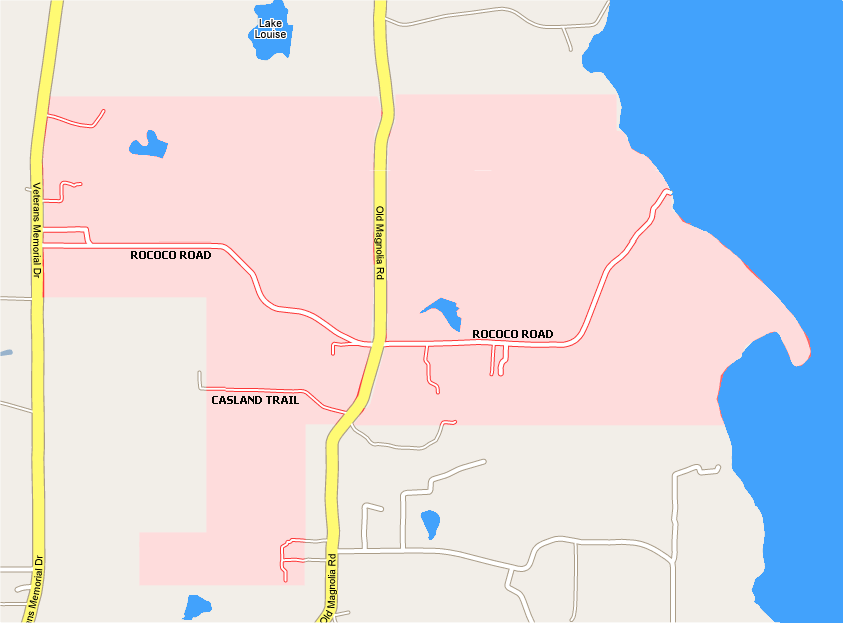
Where Blakely Plantation would be today

Blakely Plantation was a forced-labor farm of 900 acres (360 ha) located in extreme northeast Leon County, Florida. In 1850, the farm included 800 acres worked by 51 enslaved people.

Blakely was bounded on the east by Ingleside Plantation and on the west by what is today County Road 59 (Veterans Memorial Drive). Blakely's northern boundary would now be Cypress Landing Road and to the south it would have bounded by the streets of Leland Circle and Indigo Lane.

The farm was founded by Miles Blake, who came from North Carolina in 1826. After Miles died, his wife Susan Parish Blake took over ownership. The 1850 tax roll for Leon County lists Susan Blake as owning 800 acres and enslaving 51 people.

Sometime before 1860, Susan's son Joel Blake established Ingleside Plantation just east of Blakely.

The Leon County Florida 1860 Agricultural Census shows that the Blakely Plantation had the following:

- Improved land: 500 acres (200 ha)
- Unimproved land: 400 acres (160 ha)
- Cash value of plantation: $9,000
- Cash value of farm implements/machinery: $300
- Cash value of farm animals: $2,000
- Number of slaves: unknown
- Bushels of corn: 3,000
- Bales of cotton: 40

Isham, Walter, and Joel Blake, Susan's sons, served in the Civil War with Company K of the 5th Florida Infantry.

As of 1980, J. A. Cromartie, a Blake great-grandson, owned the property.
