= Averitt-Winchester House =

Historic house in Florida, United States

- U.S. National Register of Historic Places
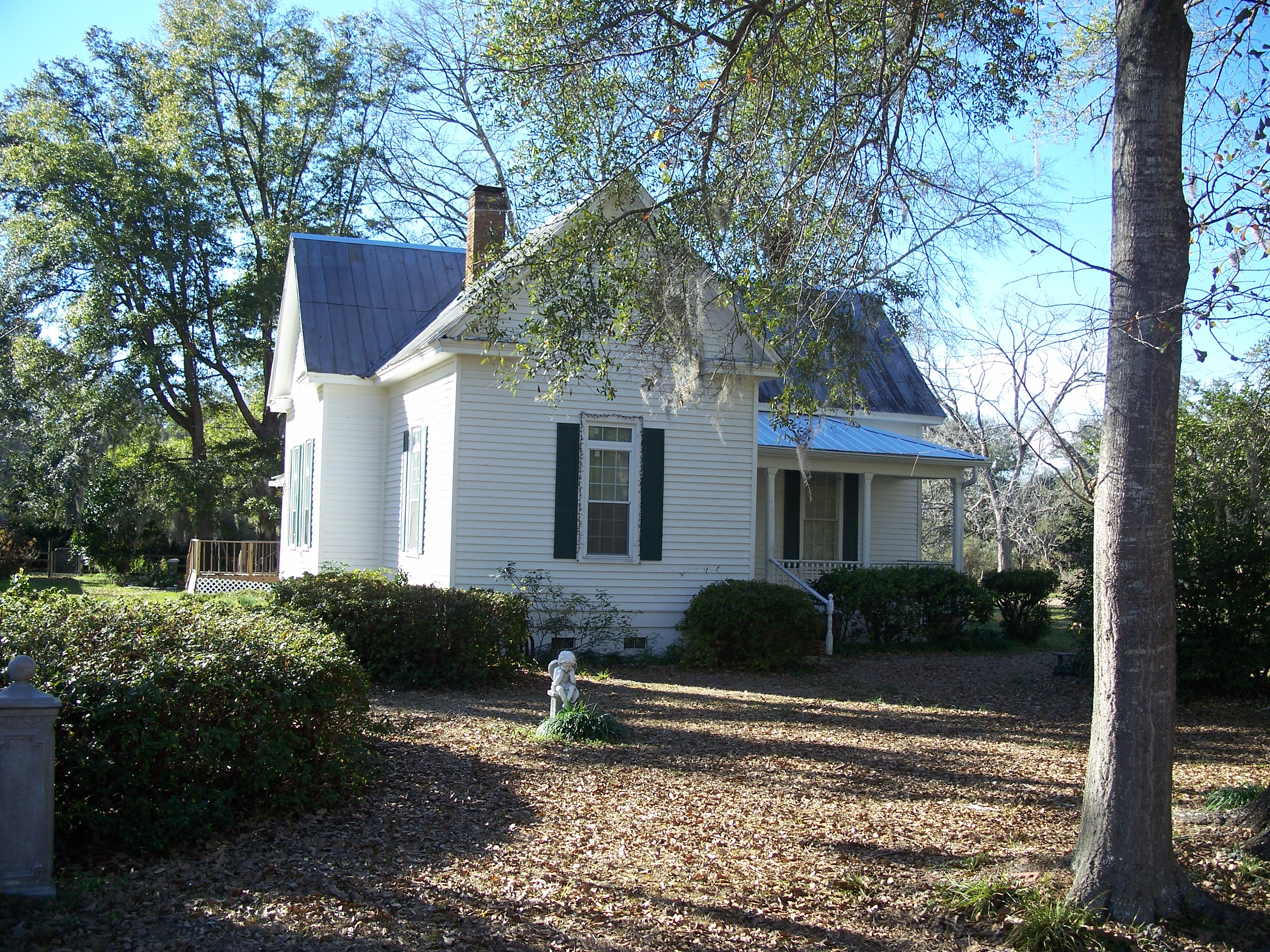

- Location within Florida
- Location: Miccosukee, Florida
- Coordinates: 30°35′33″N 84°2′31″W
- Area: 3.5 acres
- Built: c. 1881
- Architectural style: Frame Vernacular
- NRHP reference No.: 96001336
- Added to NRHP: November 15, 1996

The Averitt-Winchester House (also known as the Lee House) is a historic house located on the west side of State Road 59, south of the Moccasin Gap-Cromartie Road junction in Miccosukee, Florida, United States. The house is locally significant in its association with post-American Civil War settlement of the area and essentially unaltered appearance.

== Description and history ==
The house, built c. 1881, is a one-story, gable-front-and-wing, frame vernacular building resting on brick piers. With a clapboard exterior, it has an irregular layout with two ell extensions on either side and a high-pitched tin roof pierced by two brick chimneys. the house is the oldest residence in the community, and its owners were from the earliest settler families of the area. The Averitts played an instrumental role in the founding of Indian Springs Baptist Church, providing the land for the second church building.

It was added to the U.S. National Register of Historic Places on November 15, 1996.
