= Tall Timbers Research Station and Land Conservancy =

Research facility in Leon County, Florida, US

- Formation: May 24, 1960; 66 years ago
- Founder: Henry Beadel
- Type: Nonprofit
- Tax ID no.: 59-0952956
- Legal status: 501(c)(3)
- Purpose: Foster exemplary land stewardship through research, conservation and education
- Headquarters: 13093 Henry Beadel Drive, Tallahassee, Florida
- Coordinates: 30.656742°N 84.209325°W
- Region served: Southeastern United States Primarily
- Key people: William E. Palmer (President/CEO)
- Main organ: Board of Directors
- Revenue: $13.66 million (2020)
- Expenses: $11.91 million (2020)
- Staff: 114
- Website: https://talltimbers.org

Tall Timbers Research Station and Land Conservancy is a research and learning facility located in northern Leon County, Florida, just off County Road 12 on the north side of Lake Iamonia. Tall Timbers researches the areas of fire ecology, resource management, forestry, game bird management, and vertebrate ecology.

== Origins ==
Edward Beadel was a wealthy architect from New York City who went south each winter. He was also an avid hunter who lodged at the Piney Woods Hotel in Thomasville, Georgia. The hotel was constructed circa 1885 but burned to the ground in 1906. "Beadel would often cross the Florida border to hunt on the property of Charlie Davis. Beadel was so impressed with Leon County that in 1895 he purchased 2,200-acres (890 ha) of land along the north shore of Lake Iamonia for $8000 (~$268,708 in 2025). At that time he also designed and built a $3000 vernacular colonial revival home where a plantation house had once stood. He renamed the property Tall Timbers Plantation. The home had its own water tower, boat house, and other outbuildings.

Edward Beadel died in 1919 and the property passed to his nephew, Henry Ludlow Beadel. Henry was a philanthropist and naturalist who had been hunting in Leon County since 1894. An additional 600-acres was added to the plantation. Two years later, a single story, five-bay wing was constructed east of the main house, connected by an 86-foot porch. Additional bedroom space was created by adding three dormers to the front of the main house. Henry lived in the east wing from 1921 until his death in 1963 and the interior remains unchanged. Field hunting was accomplished via horse-drawn carriage. For duck hunting, Henry used a handmade tin boat of between 8 and 9 feet in length. Tall Timbers also had a number of canoes. By this time, the house had a huge stone fireplace and rustic furniture fit for a lodge. The exterior had a sweeping porch facing the lake.

Beadel was one of several plantation owners who sponsored a 1924 scientific inquiry into local quail population declines. This was the first study that grew into the research station. Henry Beadel's will left the plantation for use as a nature preserve for wildlife research. The Tall Timbers Inc was established in 1958 and incorporated May 24, 1960. The interior of the main house was modified for use as offices of the Research Station.

In 2014 the Conservancy announced the donation of the 9,100-acre Dixie Plantation from the Geraldine C. M. Livingston Foundation. The Oak Hill Plantation placed a conservation easement on almost one thousand acres through the conservancy.

As of 2018, the organization held in excess of 125,000 acres of conservation easements in Georgia and Florida, the area's biggest private land trust. That total rose to 158,000 acres in 2020.

The Beadel House suffered a lightning strike on March 16, 2026 which caused a fire that destroyed the structure.

== Fire Ecology Program ==
The Fire Ecology Program is designed to provide the public with applicable, science-based information on prescribed fire and vegetation dynamics in the southern pine ecosystem, specifically in the Red Hills Region.

== National training ==
The National Advanced Fire & Resource Institute created the National Interagency Prescribed Fire Training Center (PFTC) in 1998 and Tall Timbers was involved with the program from its beginning. According to their website, the purpose of the PFTC is to "Provide maximum opportunities for federal, state, local, and tribal government agencies and other organizations to build skills and knowledge of prescribed fire, with an emphasis on field experience". The courses have drawn attendees from 18 countries and every state except Rhode Island. Hands-on training for fire professionals lasts 20 days, and administrative workshops are completed in 6 days. The PFTC National offices and equipment relocated to the Tall Timbers Research Station in the spring of 2021.

== Resource Management Program ==
The Resource Management Program's responsibility is to manage the land so that the upland forests are maintained in an open, park-like condition using prescribed fire, mechanical tools, and chemical techniques to accomplish land management goals.

The Forestry Program is designed to meet the ecological forestry research needs of the Red Hills Region between Tallahassee, Florida and Thomasville, Georgia.

== Game Bird Program ==
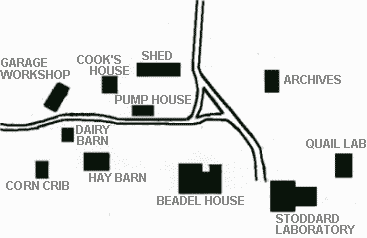
Diagram of Tall Timbers layout.

The Game Bird Program is studying the northern bobwhite quail (Colinus virginianus) and its habitats.

== Bird Dog Competition ==
The Continental Field Trial is a regional competition of pointing dogs that had been traditionally held at the Dixie Plantation since 1937. The availability of quail in the wild provides a true test for 146 "derby" and "open" dogs and their owners who travel from across the United States.

== Vertebrate Ecology Lab ==
The Vertebrate Ecology Lab was renamed as the Stoddard Lab of Ornithology in 2018 to commemorate the many contributions that Herbert Stoddard made to wildlife conservation and research. Current research projects range from assessing the effects that prescribed fires have on black rails, red-cockaded woodpeckers, and Bachman's sparrows to factors promoting cooperative breeding in the brown-headed nuthatch. The Stoddard Bird Lab also works to expand the regional population of red-cockaded woodpeckers using translocation and the construction of artificial cavities. Red-cockaded woodpeckers were extirpated from Tall Timbers in the 1970s, but a reintroduction effort initiated in 2008 using translocation and artificial cavities has led to a population of 12-14 breeding groups. Similar efforts on other properties in the Red Hills region have increased the regional woodpecker population by 30% (from 170 to 220 breeding groups). The lab also conducts translocation and fire management research with the frosted elfin, a rare butterfly.

== See also ==
- Woodlawn
- Tall Timbers Plantation (Florida)
