= Quail hunting plantation =

Land for recreational quail hunting

A quail hunting plantation is a large tract of land typically with a natural wooded and grass habitat for the purpose of recreational hunting of bobwhite quail.

== Range ==
Quail hunting plantations are found throughout the Southern United States, from Texas to South Carolina, with a high concentration in southern Georgia and northern Florida, and it may also offer hunting of dove, pheasant, duck, deer, boar, and fishing. Properties can be public or private and usually have a lodge, which can accommodate several people for several days.

Private hunting plantations keep to an exclusive clientele and are not advertised for hunting nor can they be accessed by the public.

== History ==
In the Southern United States, quail hunting plantations were created from old cotton plantations that were purchased, beginning in the 1880, by wealthy Northerners such as Howard Melville Hanna of Cleveland; Clement Griscom of Philadelphia; Walter E. Edge of New Jersey, George H. Love, a Chrysler Corp. executive of Pittsburgh; and Robert Livingston Ireland, Jr., a coal executive from Cleveland.
