= M. A. Hanna Company =

Iron ore processing company

- Industry: Iron Ore Processing
- Founded: Mahoning Valley; 1840
- Founder: Daniel F. Rhodes; Marcus Hanna
- Fate: Merged with Geon Company, August 2000, to form PolyOne Corporation
- Headquarters: Cleveland, Ohio, United States
- Number of employees: 7,149
- Parent: PolyOne Corporation
- Subsidiaries: Hanna Coal & Ore Company (liquidized 1965)

M. A. Hanna Company was an iron ore processing company located in Cleveland, Ohio, United States.

== Origin ==
The origin of the M. A. Hanna Co. is the Rhodes & Company, founded in the 1840s by Daniel F. Rhodes to mine coal in the Mahoning Valley of Ohio. Mark Hanna, a Republican political figure in Ohio, married into the Rhodes family in 1864. After the Civil War Hanna invested in a Great Lakes steamer and built a petroleum refinery (he was a high-school classmate of John D. Rockefeller, who remained a friend). By 1867, the ship had sunk, and the refinery had burned down without insurance, but his father-in-law recognized Hanna's potential and took him into Rhodes & Company as a partner before he retired. Under Hanna, the company expanded into other fields including iron ore mining in the area around Lake Superior. It became Hanna Mining in 1885.

Incorporation took place in 1922 and was named as the M.A. Hanna Company. In 1929 the Hanna Company transferred its blast furnaces, coke ovens, and other assets for stock of the National Steel Corporation. Hanna's bituminous coal properties were exchanged for stock of the newly formed Consolidation Coal Company in 1945.

== 1950s ==
In the early 1950s the company began diversification under George Humphrey producing high-grade iron ore pellets and establishing Iron Ore Company of Canada. Hanna also acquired interests in mineral companies in Latin America as well as beginning the mining of nickel in Oregon and silicon in Washington.

In 1958 Hanna's subsidiary, the Hanna Coal & Ore Company, became the independent Hanna Mining Company while M. A. Hanna continued with mineral sales and in its investment firm work until liquidation in 1965.

== 1970s ==
By the early 1970s, Hanna Mining was the world's second-largest producer of iron ore with United States Steel being the largest. They financed cops in Brasil for obtaining that. Also during this decade, Hanna secured interests in petroleum, low sulfur coal, and mineral exploration. Hanna executives believed that the name Hanna Mining did not reflect the entire scope of what the company embodied and the name returned to M. A. Hanna Company in March 1985.

On October 6, 1978, Hanna Mining Company sold the Escanaba & Lake Superior Railroad to John C. Larkin, a businessman from Minneapolis who had organized a passenger excursion on the railroad earlier in the decade.

During the 1980s under CEO Martin D. Walker, M. A. Hanna began acquiring plastic and polymer companies while divesting itself of mining and energy property. Hanna purchased Burton Rubber Processing Company in 1986 and other polymer industries totaling sales of $1.1 billion in 1990. By 1993, M. A. Hanna's revenue from polymer processing was 99% of all revenue. By 1998, annual sales reached $2.3 billion (~$4.12 billion in 2024) annually. Hanna merged with polyvinyl chloride giant Geon Company, a former division of the B. F. Goodrich Company that became a separate entity in 1993. The merger produced PolyOne Corporation, a company worth $3.5 billion and ranked in the Fortune 1000.
