= Tallahassee, Florida =

Capital city of Florida, United States

Tallahassee
- State capital city
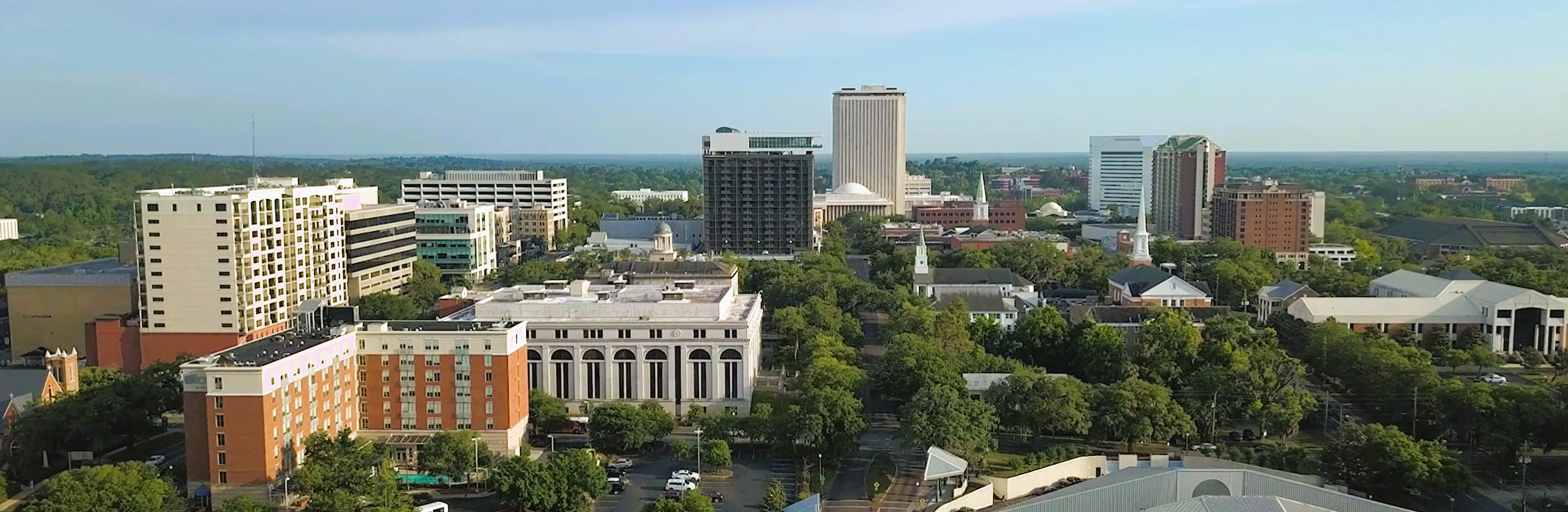
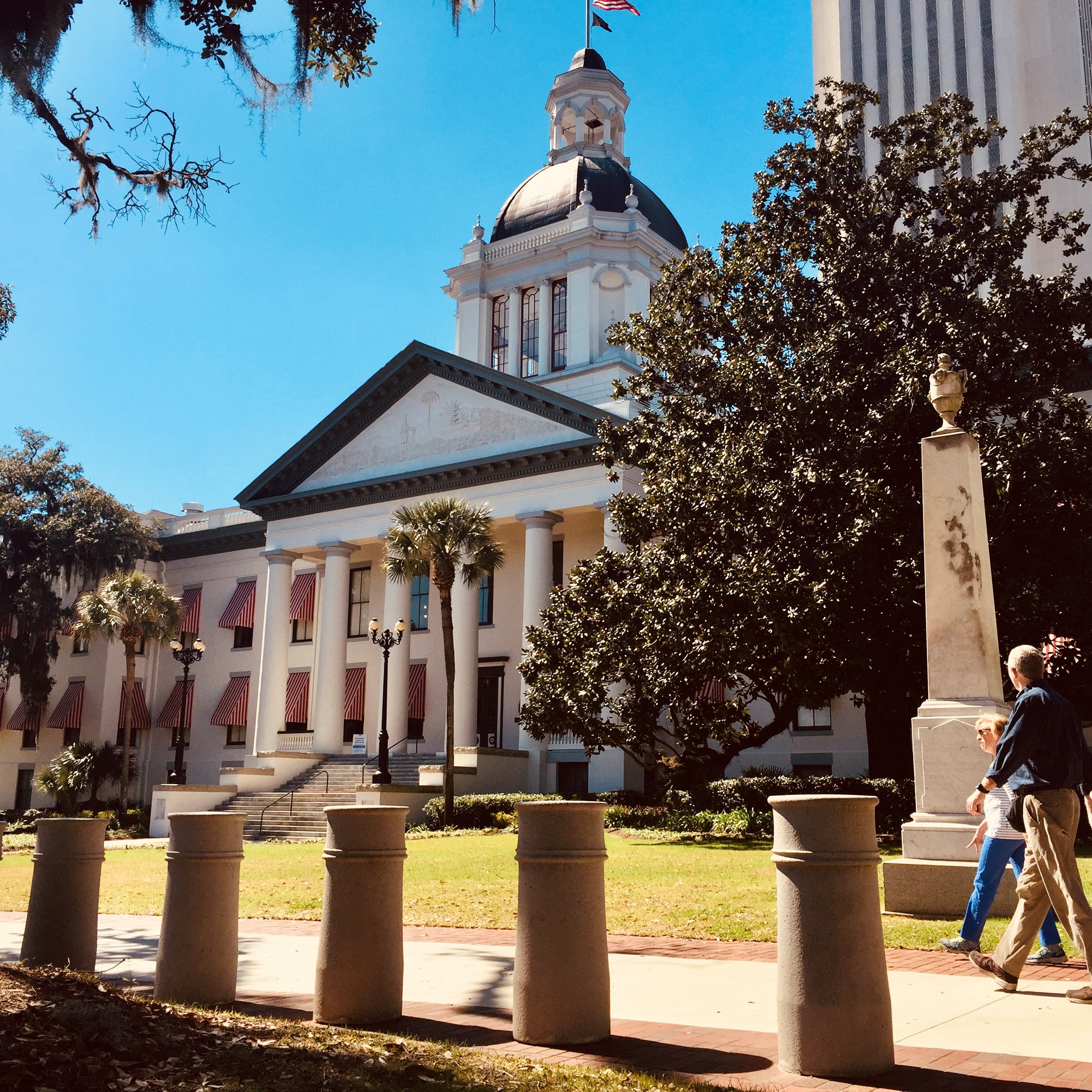
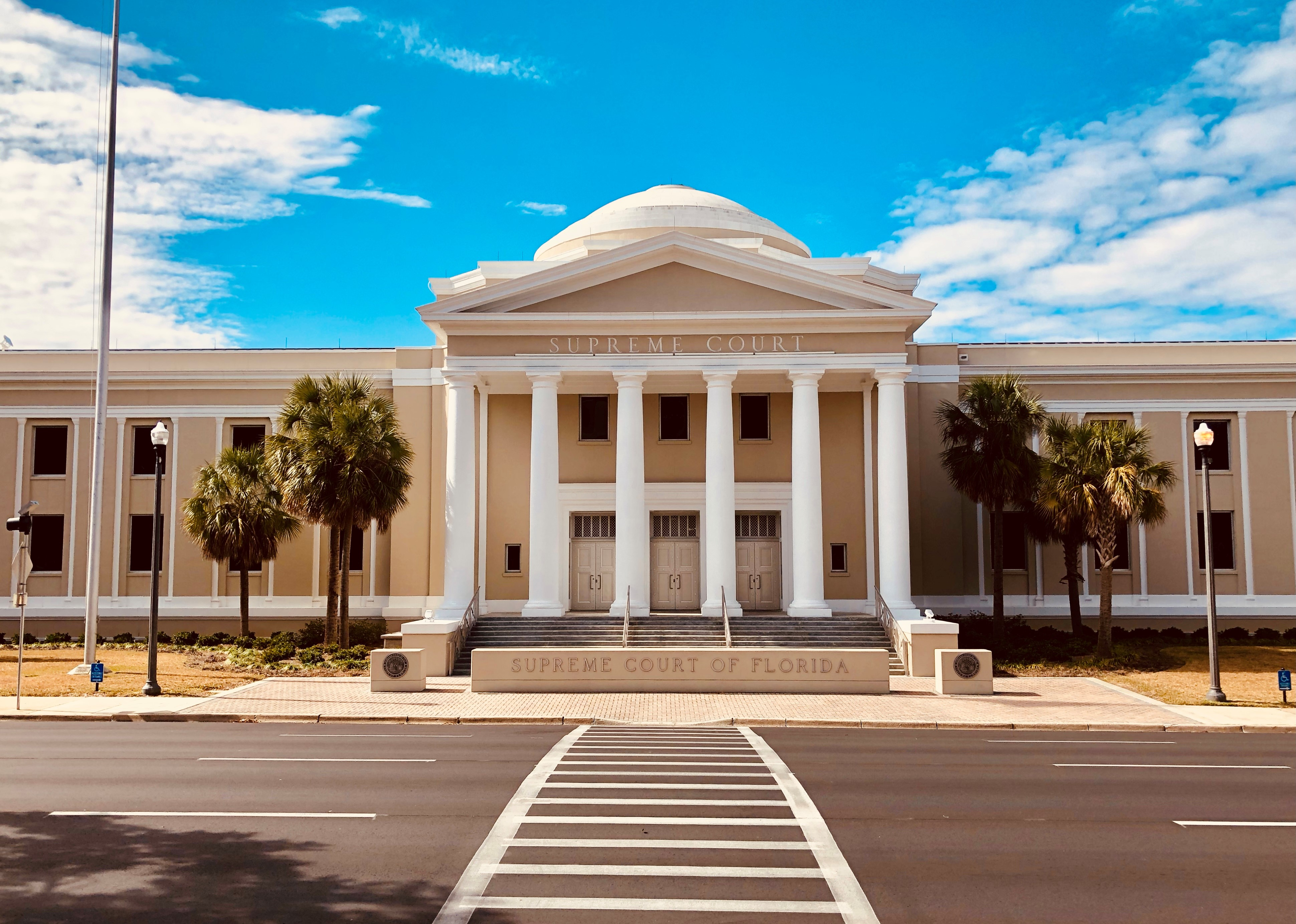
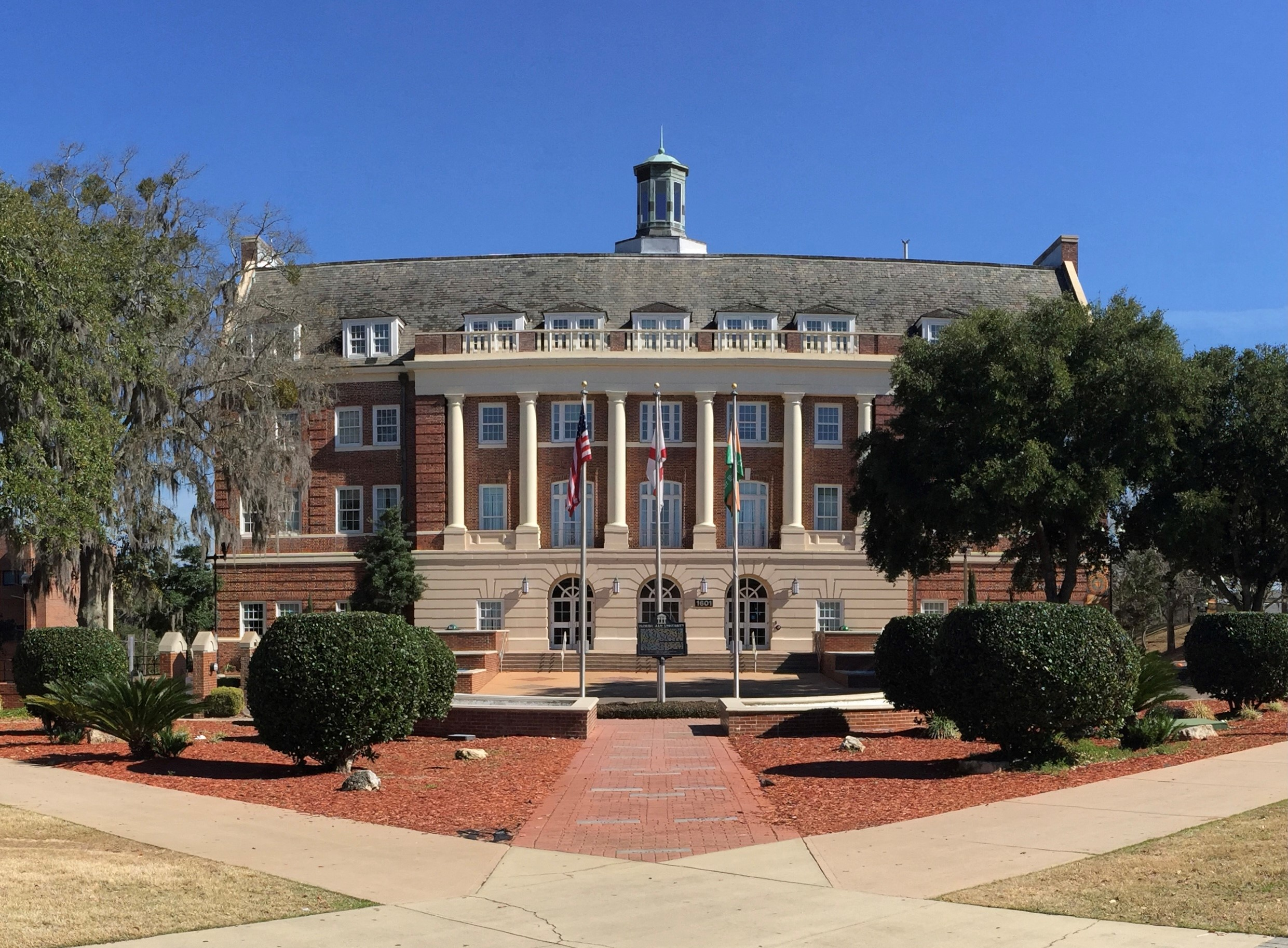
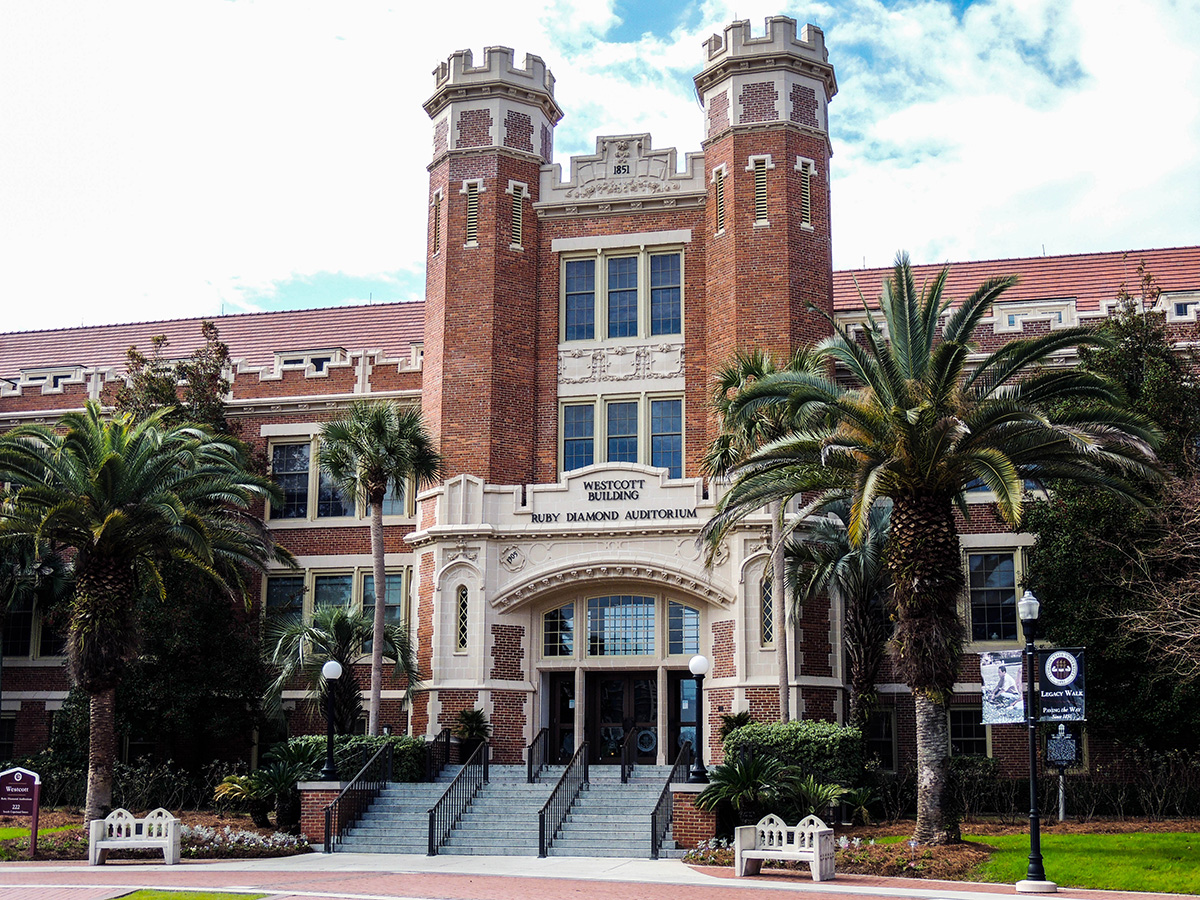
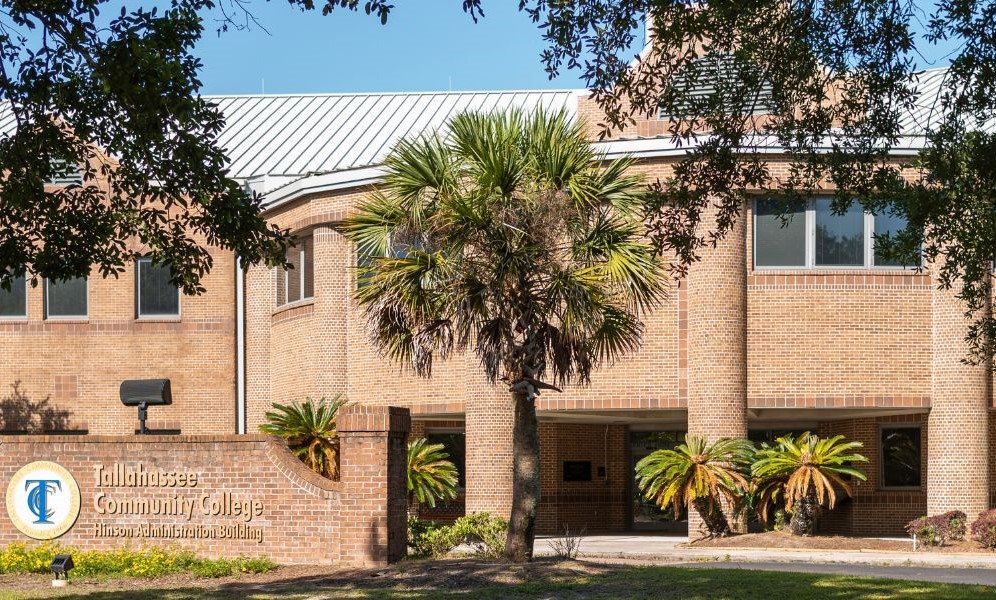
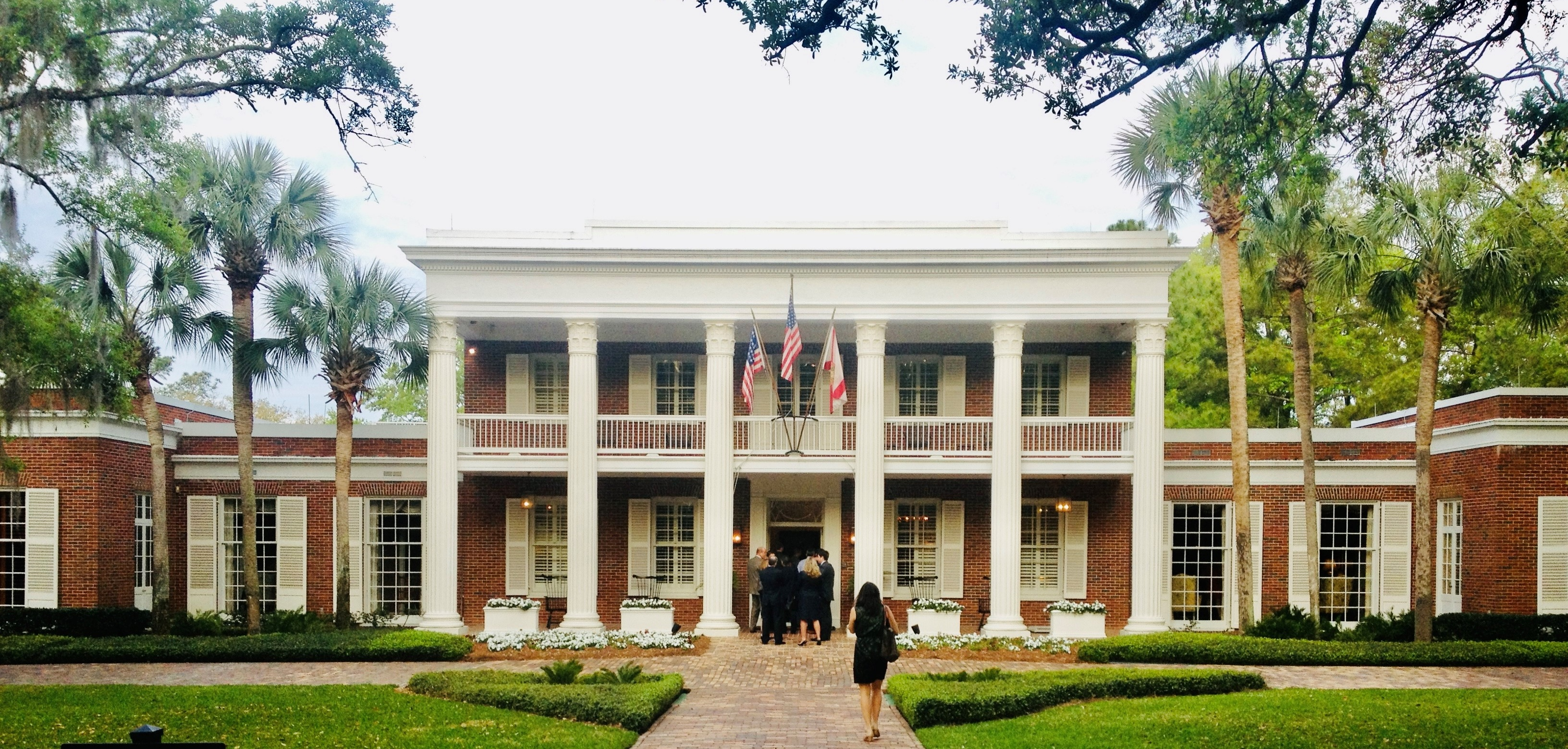
- Downtown Tallahassee Florida Capitol Florida Supreme Court Florida A&M University Florida State University Tallahassee State College Florida Governor's Mansion

- Flag Seal Logo
- Motto: "Florida's Capital City"
- Interactive map of Tallahassee
- Location within Florida Location within the United States
- Coordinates: 30°26′31″N 84°16′55″W
- Country: United States
- State: Florida
- County: Leon
- Established: 1824
- Incorporated: 1825

Government
  - Type: Commission–Manager
  - Mayor: John E. Dailey (D)

Area
  - State capital city: 104.74 sq mi (271.27 km^{2})
  - Land: 101.85 sq mi (263.80 km^{2})
  - Water: 2.88 sq mi (7.47 km^{2}) 2.59%
- Elevation: 125 ft (38 m)

Population (2020)
  - State capital city: 196,169
  - Estimate (2024): 205,089 ▲
  - Rank: 121st, U.S.
  - Density: 1,926.0/sq mi (743.64/km^{2})
  - Urban: 252,934 (US: 162nd)
  - Urban density: 2,016.1/sq mi (778.4/km^{2})
  - Metro: 397,675 (US: 140th)
- Time zone: UTC−5 (Eastern (EST))
  - Summer (DST): UTC−4 (EDT)
- ZIP Codes: 32301–32318, 32399
- Area codes: 850/448
- FIPS code: 12-70600
- GNIS feature ID: 2405563
- Website: www.talgov.com

Tallahassee (/ˌtæləˈhæsi/) is the capital city of the U.S. state of Florida. It is the county seat of and only incorporated municipality in Leon County. Tallahassee became the capital of Florida, then the Florida Territory, in 1824. In 2024, the estimated population was 205,089, making it the eighth–most populous city in the state of Florida. It is the principal city of the Tallahassee, Florida Metropolitan Statistical Area, which had an estimated population of 397,675 as of 2024. Tallahassee is the largest city in the Florida Big Bend and Florida Panhandle regions.

With a student population exceeding 70,000, Tallahassee is a college town, home to Florida State University, Florida A&M University, and Tallahassee State College (a large state college that serves mainly as a feeder school to FSU and FAMU).

As the capital, Tallahassee is the site of the Florida State Capitol, Supreme Court of Florida, Florida Governor's Mansion, and nearly 30 state agency headquarters. The city is also known for its large number of law firms, lobbying organizations, trade associations and professional associations, including The Florida Bar and the Florida Chamber of Commerce. It is a recognized regional center for scientific research, and home to the National High Magnetic Field Laboratory. In 2025, Tallahassee was awarded the All-America City Award by the National Civic League for the third time.

== History ==
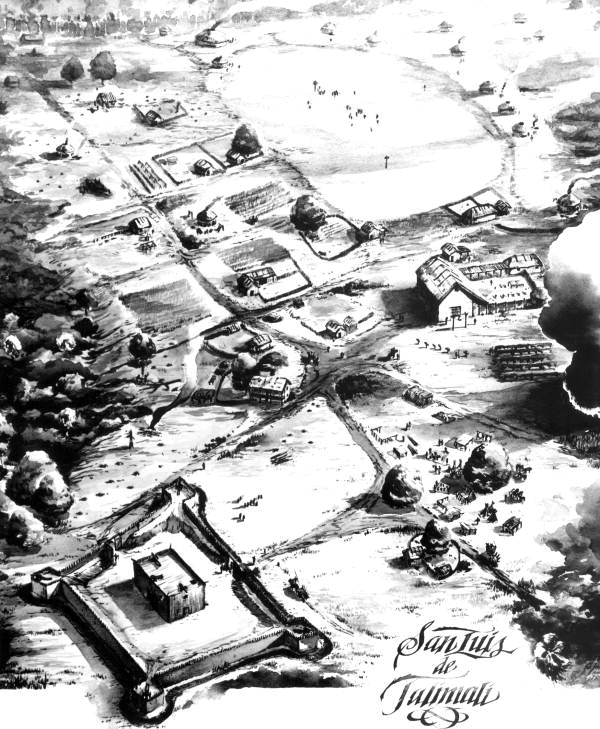
Mission San Luis de Apalachee as it may have appeared in the 17th century

Indigenous peoples occupied this area for thousands of years before European encounter. Around 1200, the large and complex Mississippian culture had built earthwork mounds near Lake Jackson which survive today; they are preserved in the Lake Jackson Archaeological State Park.

The Spanish founded St. Augustine in 1565, establishing the oldest continuously occupied European-established settlement in the continental United States. In the 17th century, they developed a network of missions in Apalachee territory to supply food and labor for the colony and to convert Indigenous peoples to Roman Catholicism. The largest, Mission San Luis de Apalachee in Tallahassee, has been partially reconstructed by the state of Florida. The Narváez expedition encountered the Apalachee people but did not reach the site of Tallahassee. In 1539–40, Hernando de Soto's expedition occupied the Apalachee town of Anhaica (in present-day Tallahassee) over the winter. Based on archaeological excavations, the Anhaica site was about 0.5 miles (800 m) east of the present Florida State Capitol. The De Soto encampment is often cited as the first place that Christmas was celebrated in the continental United States.

The name Tallahassee is a Muskogean word often translated as "old fields" or "old town". It was likely an expression used by Creek migrants from Georgia and Alabama who moved into the region in the late 18th and early 19th centuries as U.S. settlement expanded into their homelands, where they found large areas of cleared land previously occupied by the Apalachee. The Creek and later refugees who joined them developed as the Seminole people of Florida. The Talimali Band of Apalachee Indians in Louisiana identify as present-day descendants of the Apalachee.

During the First Seminole War, General Andrew Jackson conducted operations in and around Tallahassee against the Seminoles and other Native people. On November 12, 1817, after Chief Neamathla of the village of Fowltown (just west of present-day Tallahassee) refused orders to relocate, U.S. forces entered the village, burned it, and drove off its inhabitants. The Indians retaliated, killing soldiers and civilians. Jackson reentered Florida in March 1818. According to Jackson’s adjutant, Colonel Robert Butler, they "advanced on the Indian village called Tallahasse [sic] [where] two of the enemy were made prisoner".

=== State capital ===
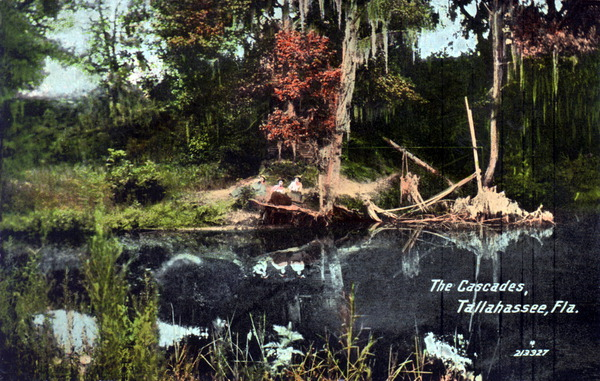
A hand-colored photograph of Cascades Park in 1912

Florida became an American territory in September 1821, in accordance with the Adams-Onís Treaty of 1819.

The first session of the Legislative Council of the Territory of Florida met on July 22, 1822, at Pensacola, the former capital of West Florida. Members from St. Augustine, the former capital of East Florida, traveled 59 days by water to attend. The second session was in St. Augustine, and western delegates needed 28 days to travel perilously around the peninsula to reach St. Augustine. During this session, delegates decided to hold future meetings at a halfway point. Two appointed commissioners selected Tallahassee, then an Apalachee settlement (Anhaica) virtually abandoned after Andrew Jackson burned it in 1818, as a halfway point. In 1824, the third legislative session met there in a crude log building serving as the capitol.

From 1821 through 1845, during Florida's territorial period, the rough-hewn frontier capital gradually developed as a town. The Marquis de Lafayette, French hero of the American Revolution, returned to the United States in 1824 for a tour. The U.S. Congress voted to give him $200,000 (the same amount he had given the colonies in 1778), US citizenship, and the Lafayette Land Grant, 36 square miles (93 km^{2}) of land that today includes large portions of Tallahassee. In 1845, a Greek revival masonry structure was erected as the Capitol building in time for statehood. Now known as the "old Capitol", it stands in front of the high-rise Capitol building built in the 1970s.

Tallahassee was in the heart of Florida's Cotton Belt (Leon County led the state in cotton production) and was the center of the slave trade in Florida. During the American Civil War, Tallahassee was the only Confederate state capital east of the Mississippi River not captured by Union forces, and the only one not burned. A small engagement, the Battle of Natural Bridge, was fought south of the city on March 6, 1865, just a month before the war ended.

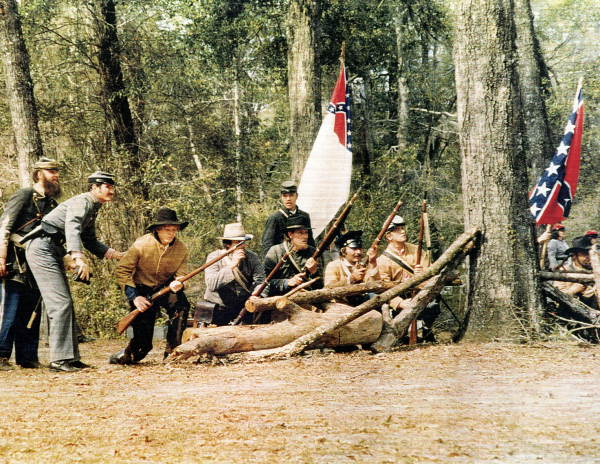
A reenactment of the 1865 Battle of Natural Bridge

During the 19th century, the institutions that later developed into Florida State University were established in Tallahassee; it became a university town. These included the Tallahassee Female Academy (founded 1843) and the Florida Institute (founded 1854). In 1851, the Florida legislature decreed two seminaries be built on either side of the Suwannee River, East Florida Seminary and West Florida Seminary. In 1855, West Florida Seminary was transferred to the Florida Institute building (which had been established as an inducement for the state to place the seminary in Tallahassee). In 1858, the seminary absorbed the Tallahassee Female Academy and became coeducational. Its main building was near the northwest corner of South Copeland and West Jefferson streets, approximately where FSU's Westcott Building is today.

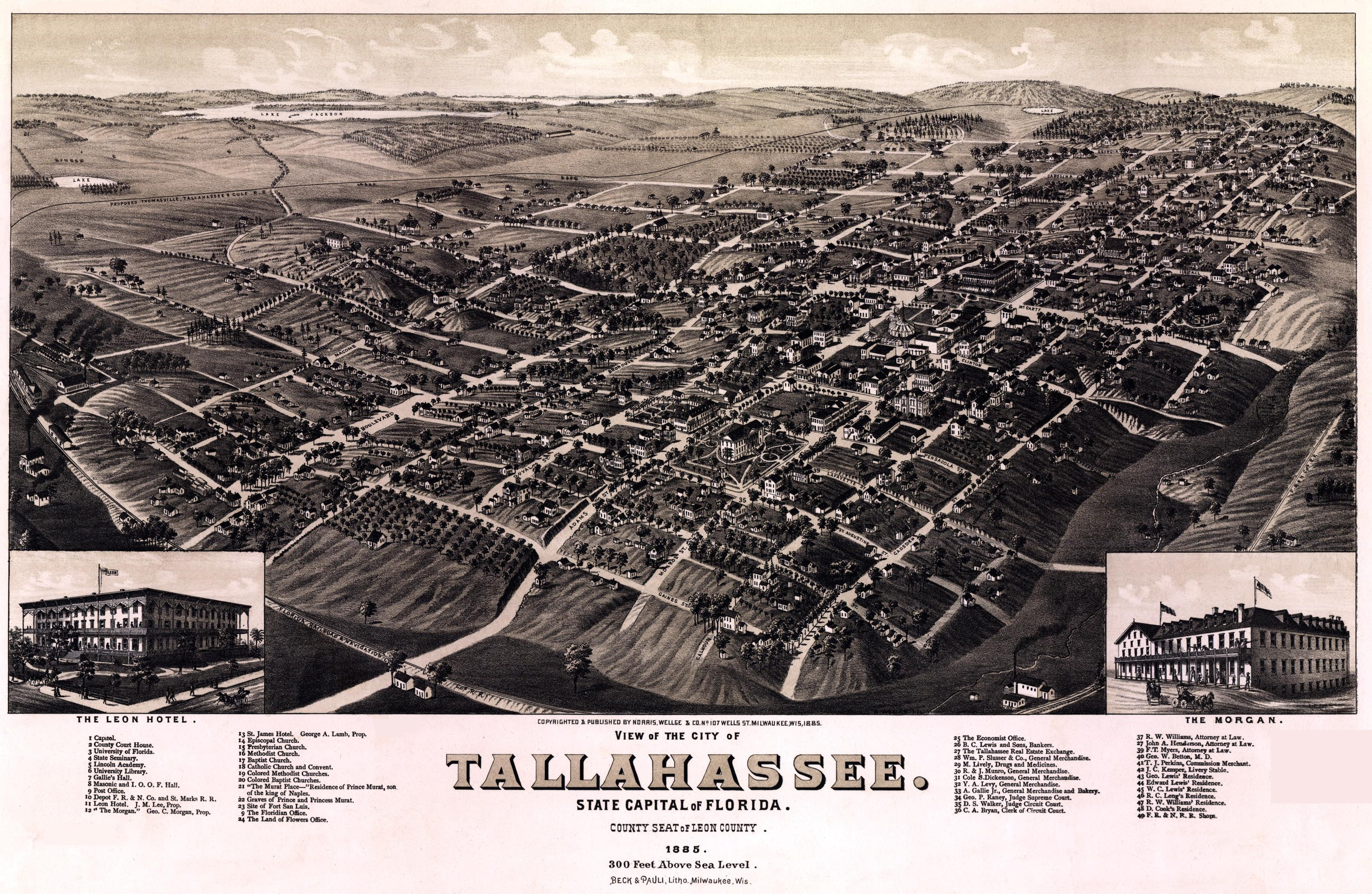
Tallahassee in 1885

In 1887, the Normal College for Colored Students, the ancestor of today's FAMU, opened its doors. The legislature decided Tallahassee was the best location in Florida for a college serving African-American students; the state had segregated schools. Four years later, its name was changed to State Normal and Industrial College for Colored Students, to teach teachers for elementary school children and students in industrial skills.

After the Civil War, much of Florida's industry moved south and east, a trend that continues today. The end of slavery and the rise of free labor reduced the profitability of the cotton and tobacco trades, at a time when world markets were also changing. The state's major industries shifted to citrus, lumber, naval stores, cattle ranching, and tourism. The latter was increasingly important by the late 19th century. In the post-Civil War period, many former plantations in the Tallahassee area were purchased by wealthy northerners for use as winter hunting preserves. This included the hunting preserve of Henry L. Beadel, who bequeathed his land for the study of the effects of fire on wildlife habitat. Today the preserve is known as the Tall Timbers Research Station and Land Conservancy, nationally recognized for its research into fire ecology and the use of prescribed burning.

=== 1900–1999 ===
Until World War II, Tallahassee remained a small Southern town with virtually the entire population living within one mile (1.6 km) of the Capitol. The main economic drivers were the colleges and state government, where politicians met to discuss spending money on grand public improvement projects to accommodate growth in places such as Miami and Tampa Bay, hundreds of miles away from the capital.

Tallahassee was also active in protest during the civil rights era. The Tallahassee bus boycott was a citywide boycott that sought to end racial segregation in the employment and seating arrangements of city buses. On May 26, 1956, Florida A&M University students Wilhelmina Jakes and Carrie Patterson were arrested by the Tallahassee Police Department for "placing themselves in a position to incite a riot". Robert Saunders, representing the NAACP, and Rev. C. K. Steele began talks with city authorities, while the local African-American community began boycotting the city's buses. The Inter-Civic Council ended the boycott on December 22, 1956. On January 7, 1957, the City Commission repealed the bus-franchise segregation clause because of the United States Supreme Court ruling in Browder v. Gayle (1956). In the 1960s, there was a movement to transfer the capital to Orlando, closer to the state's growing population centers. That movement was defeated; the 1970s saw a long-term commitment by the state to the capital city, with the construction of the new capitol complex and preservation of the old Florida State Capitol building.

In 1970, the Census Bureau reported the city's population as 74.0% white and 25.4% black. In 1971, the city elected James R. Ford to the 5-member City Commission, and he became the city's first African-American mayor in 1972 (commissioners rotated into the position serving a one-year term).

Bobby Bowden became the head coach of Florida State Seminoles football in 1976, and turned Tallahassee into a city dominated by college football. Bowden became very successful very quickly at Florida State. By his second year, Bowden had to deny rumors that he would leave for another job; the team went 9–2, compared to the four wins total in the three seasons before Bowden. During 34 years as head coach he had only one losing season: his first, in 1976.

In 1977, the 22-story high-rise Capitol building, designed by architect Edward Durell Stone, was completed. Since 2021, it has been the third-tallest state capitol building in the United States. In 1978, the Old Capitol, directly in front of the new Capitol, was scheduled for demolition, but state officials decided to keep it as a museum. In 1986, Jack McLean served as mayor, the second African-American to hold the position.

=== 2000–present ===
Tallahassee was the center of world attention for six weeks during the 2000 United States Presidential election recount, which involved numerous rulings by the Florida Secretary of State and the Florida Supreme Court.

Tallahassee has been impacted by many natural disasters, including a direct hit by Hurricane Hermine, which caused about 80% of the city proper to lose power, including Florida State University; Hurricane Michael in 2018; and two simultaneous EF2 tornadoes in 2024.

== Geography ==
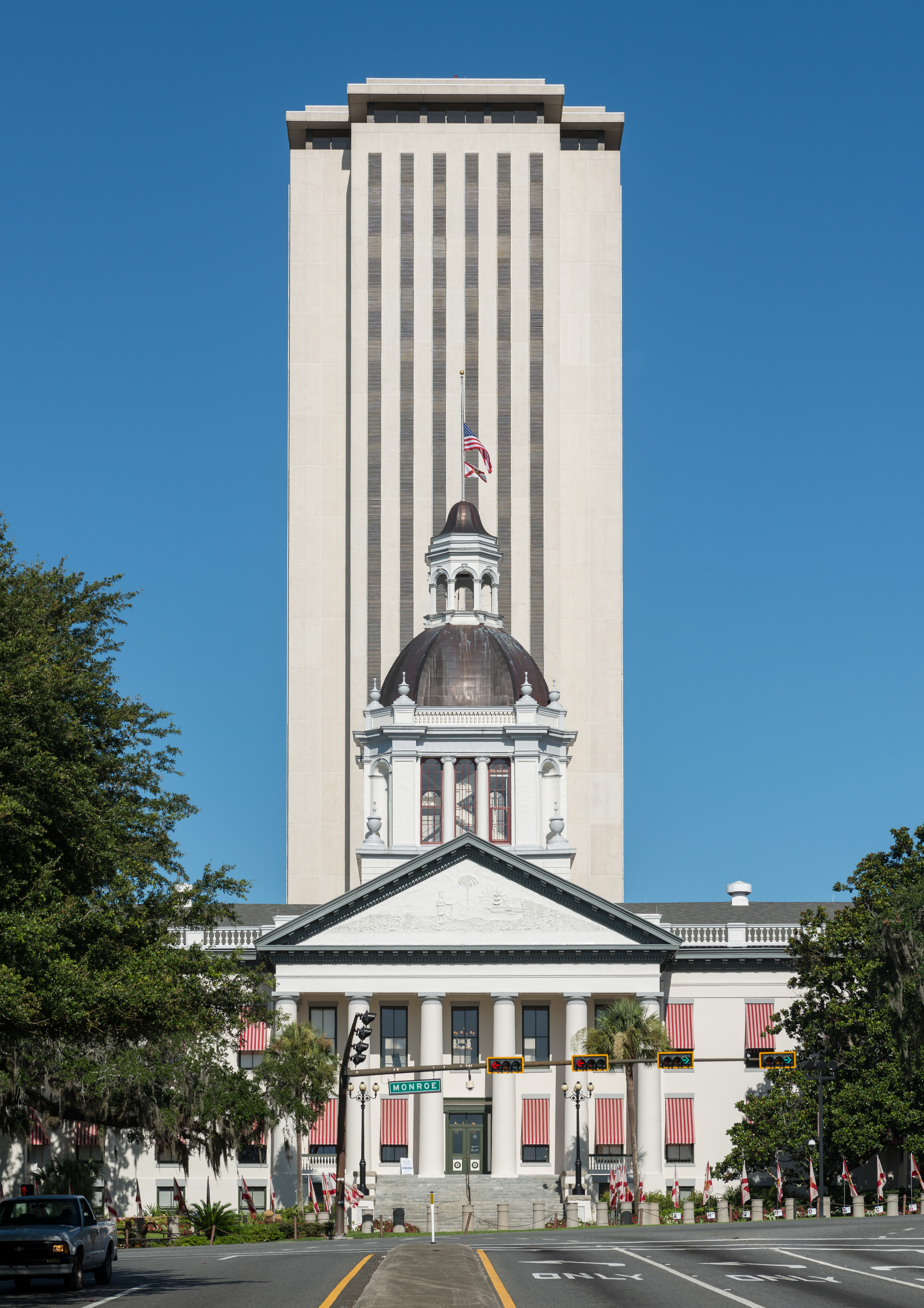
A view of both the historic and the current Florida State Capitols

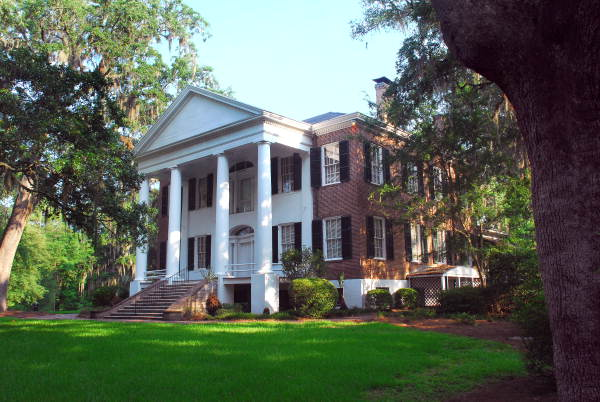
Historic Grove Plantation, known officially as the Call/Collins House at The Grove. Territorial Governor Richard Keith Call built this antebellum plantation house c. 1840.

The coordinates for the City of Tallahassee are 30°26′31″N 84°16′55″W.

The city has an area of 98.2 square miles (254.3 km^{2}), of which 95.7 square miles (247.9 km^{2}) is land and 2.5 square miles (6.5 km^{2}), or 2.59%, is water.

Tallahassee's terrain is hilly by Florida standards, being at the southern end of the Red Hills Region, just above the Cody Scarp. The elevation varies from near sea level to just over 200 feet (61 m), with the state capitol on one of the highest hills in the city. The city includes two large lake basins, Lake Jackson and Lake Lafayette, and borders the northern end of the Apalachicola National Forest.

The flora and fauna are similar to those found in the mid-south and low country regions of South Carolina and Georgia. The palm trees are the more cold-hardy varieties like the state tree, the Sabal palmetto. Pines, magnolias, hickories, and a variety of oaks are the dominant trees. The Southern Live Oak is perhaps the most emblematic of the city.

=== Nearby cities and suburbs ===
- Crawfordville
- Havana
- Lamont
- Lloyd
- Midway
- Monticello
- Quincy

=== Cityscape ===
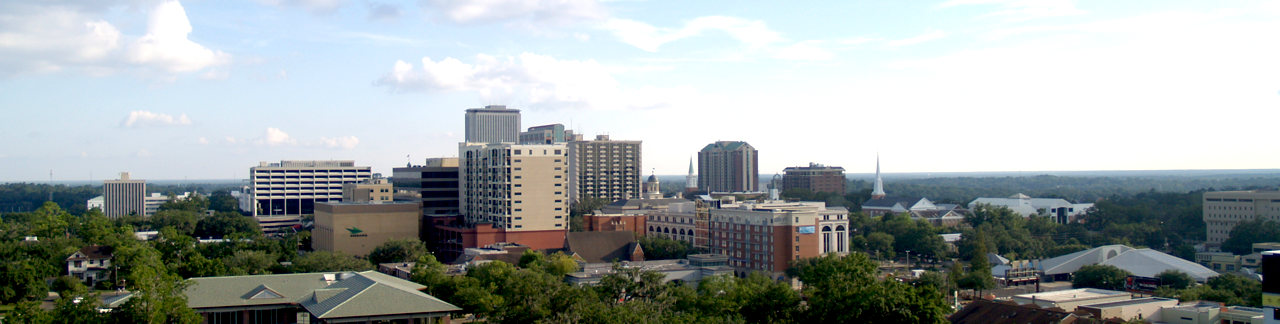
A panoramic view of Downtown Tallahassee

==== Neighborhoods ====
Tallahassee has many neighborhoods inside the city limits. Some of the most known and defined include All Saints, Apalachee Ridge, Betton Hills, Buck Lake, Callen, Frenchtown (the oldest historically black neighborhood in the state), Killearn Estates, Killearn Lakes Plantation, Lafayette Park, Levy Park, Los Robles, Midtown, Holly Hills, Jake Gaither/University Park, Indian Head Acres, Myers Park, Smokey Hollow, SouthWood, Seminole Manor and Woodland Drives.

==== Canopy Roads ====
Tallahassee is notable for its canopy roads. The residents appreciate them and they offer a tranquil alternative to the normal city expanse of asphalt, cement and signs. Tallahassee has nine "officially designated" canopy roads that contribute greatly to the southern charm of the city.

==== City parks ====
Tallahassee has an extensive city parks and recreation system managed by the City of Tallahassee Parks, Recreation and Neighborhood Affairs Department (PRNA). They manage 100 entities including 6 swimming pools, 2 golf courses, 20 ball fields, 21 basketball courts, 3 disc golf courses, 5 dog parks, 12 football fields, 33 geocaches, 9 gymnastic centers, 4 exercise centers, 22 lakes/ponds, 32 playgrounds, 10 tennis courts, 10 soccer fields, 7 sand volleyball courts, 12 pickleball courts, 43 picnic areas, 44 open grass areas, 32 trail/paths, 11 nature preserves, 2 skateparks.

==== Tallest buildings ====
Rank	Name	Street Address	Height (ft)	Height (m)	Floors	Year
1	Florida State Capitol	400 South Monroe St.	345	101	25	1977
2	Turlington Building	325 West Gaines St.	318	97	19	1990
3	Plaza Tower	300 South Duval St.	276	84	24	2008
4	Highpoint Center	106 East College Ave.	239	70	15	1990
5	DoubleTree Hotel	101 South Adams St.	220	67	17	1972

=== Urban planning and expansion ===
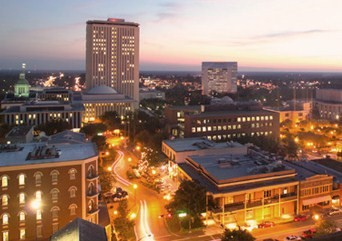
Downtown Tallahassee at night

The first plan for the Capitol Center was the 1947 Taylor Plan, which consolidated several government buildings in one downtown area. In 1974, the Capitol Center Planning Commission for the City of Tallahassee, Florida responded to growth of its urban center with a conceptual plan for the expansion of its Capitol Center. Hisham Ashkouri, working for The Architects' Collaborative, led the urban planning and design effort. Estimating growth and related development for approximately the next 25 years, the program projected the need for 2.3 million square feet (214,000 m^{2}) of new government facilities in the city core, with 3,500 dwelling units, 100 acres (40 ha) of new public open space, retail and private office space, and other ancillary spaces. Community participation was an integral part of the design review, welcoming Tallahassee residents to provide input as well as citizens' groups and government agencies, resulting in the creation of six separate design alternatives.

=== Sprawl and compact growth ===
The Tallahassee–Leon County Planning Department implements policies aimed at promoting compact growth and development, including the establishment and maintenance of an Urban Service Area. The intent of the Urban Service Area is to "have Tallahassee and Leon County grow in a responsible manner, with infrastructure provided economically and efficiently, and surrounding forest and agricultural lands protected from unwarranted and premature conversion to urban land use." The result of compact growth policies has been a significant overall reduction in the Sprawl Index for Tallahassee between 2000 and 2010. CityLab reported on this finding, stating "Tallahassee laps the field, at least as far as the Sprawl Index is concerned."

=== Climate ===
Tallahassee

Climate chart (precipitation, max. and min. temperature)
J	F	M	A	M	J	J	A	S	O	N	D
4.4 64 41	4.3 68 44	5.2 74 49	3.5 80 54	3.4 87 63	7.8 91 71	7.1 92 73	7.6 92 73	4.9 89 70	3.2 82 59	3.1 73 48	4.2 66 43
- █ Average max. and min. temperatures in °F
- █ Precipitation totals in inches
- Source: NOAA
Metric conversion
J	F	M	A	M	J	J	A	S	O	N	D
112 18 5	109 20 6	133 23 9	90 27 12	85 31 17	197 33 22	181 33 23	193 33 23	125 31 21	82 28 15	79 23 9	108 19 6
- █ Average max. and min. temperatures in °C
- █ Precipitation totals in mm

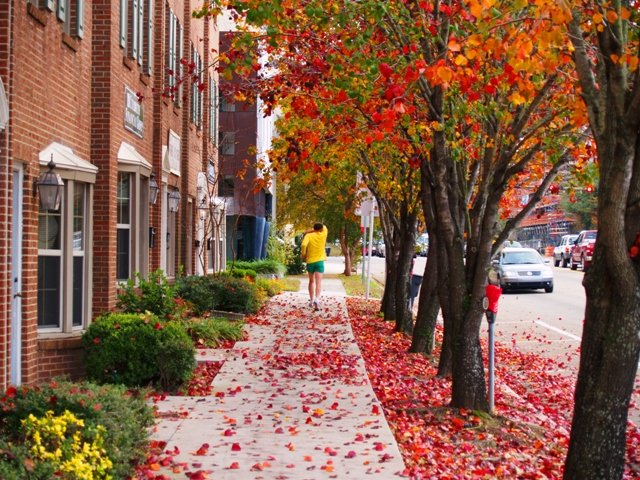
Tallahassee experiences four seasons. Shown here are the autumn leaves along the sidewalks of Monroe Street in Downtown Tallahassee.

Tallahassee has a humid subtropical climate (Köppen: Cfa), with long, tropical summers and short, mild winters, as well as warm to hot, drier springs and autumns. Tallahassee is in USDA hardiness zone 9a (20 to 25 °F; −7 to −4 °C). Summer maximum temperatures are hotter than locations to the south on the Florida peninsula and it is one of the few cities in the state to occasionally record temperatures above 100 °F (37.8 °C); there are an average of 11.2 days per year that have temperatures at least that high. The record high of 105 °F (41 °C) was set on June 15, 2011.

Summer is characterized by brief intense showers and thunderstorms that form along the afternoon sea breeze from the Gulf of Mexico. The daily mean temperature in July, the hottest month, is 82.9 °F (28.3 °C). Conversely, the winter is markedly cooler, with a January daily average temperature of 51.0 °F (10.6 °C). There is an average of 34.6 nights with a minimum at or below freezing, and on average, the window for freezing temperatures is from November 22 thru March 16, allowing a growing season of 250 days. With the data from the 1991–2020 normals, Tallahassee is in a USDA 9a zone by a small margin, the coldest temperature of the year usually being about 20.2 °F (−6.6 °C). Temperature readings below 15 °F (−9 °C) are very rare, having last occurred on January 11, 2010.

During the Great Blizzard of 1899 the city reached −2 °F (−19 °C) on February 13, which remains Florida's only recorded subzero reading. The record cold daily maximum is 22 °F (−6 °C), set on the same day as the all-time record low. More recently, a 28 °F (−2 °C) daily maximum was recorded in 1985. Conversely, the record warm daily minimum is 81 °F (27 °C) on July 15, 1980. However, the city itself is considerably warmer than the airport where the National Weather Service records its data from, even though the National Weather Service does not record data from it. This is due to an urban heat island, which creates an average disparity of 5.8 °F (3.2 °C) and is especially pronounced during winter.

Snow and ice are rare in Tallahassee, not occurring during most winters. Historically, snow flurries are recorded every three to four years, but measurable snowfall of 0.1 inches (0.3 cm) or more has only happened once in the 1991–2020 time period. Tallahassee has recorded a few very small accumulating snowfalls over the last 100 years; the greatest amount was 2.8 inches (7 cm) on February 13, 1958. Tallahassee's other recorded measurable snowfalls were 1.0 inch (2.5 cm) on February 12–13, 1899, and December 22–23, 1989; 0.4 inches (1.0 cm) on March 28, 1955, and February 10, 1973; 0.2 inches (0.5 cm) on February 2, 1951; 0.1 inches (0.3 cm) on January 3, 2018; and 1.9 inches on January 21–22, 2025.

Although several hurricanes have brushed Tallahassee with their outer rain and wind bands, in recent years only Hurricane Kate, in 1985, and Hurricane Hermine, in 2016, have struck Tallahassee directly. Hurricane Michael passed 50 miles (80 km) to the west after making landfall near Mexico Beach, Florida in October 2018 as a Category 5 storm, resulting in 95% of Leon County being without power.

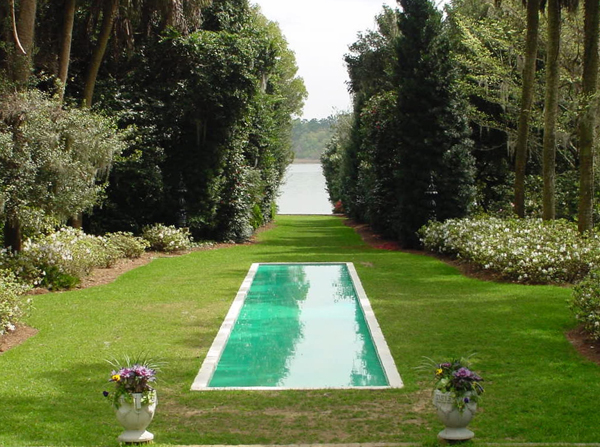
Maclay Gardens Reflection Pool

The Big Bend area of North Florida sees several tornadoes each year during the season, but they are generally weak, cause little structural damage, and rarely hit the city. On April 19, 2015, a tornado touched down in Tallahassee. The tornado was rated EF1, and created a path as wide as 350 yards (320 m) for almost 5 miles (8 km) near Maclay Gardens. Damage included numerous downed tree limbs and a car crushed by a falling tree. During extremely heavy rains, some low-lying parts of Tallahassee may flood, notably the Franklin Boulevard area adjacent to the downtown and the Killearn Lakes subdivision, outside the Tallahassee city limits, on the north side. The most recent tornadoes to hit the city were EF2s on May 10, 2024. One of them hit downtown Tallahassee, being 1,400 yards (1,300 m) wide.

Climate data for Tallahassee International Airport, Florida (1991–2020 normals, (Note: Mean monthly maxima and minima (i.e. the highest and lowest temperature readings during an entire month or year) calculated based on data at said location from 1991 to 2020.) extremes 1892–present)
Month	Jan	Feb	Mar	Apr	May	Jun	Jul	Aug	Sep	Oct	Nov	Dec	Year
Record high °F (°C)	84 (29)	89 (32)	91 (33)	95 (35)	102 (39)	105 (41)	104 (40)	103 (39)	102 (39)	97 (36)	89 (32)	84 (29)	105 (41)
Mean maximum °F (°C)	78.4 (25.8)	80.4 (26.9)	86.0 (30.0)	89.7 (32.1)	95.5 (35.3)	98.1 (36.7)	98.8 (37.1)	97.9 (36.6)	95.6 (35.3)	90.8 (32.7)	84.5 (29.2)	79.3 (26.3)	99.8 (37.7)
Mean daily maximum °F (°C)	63.9 (17.7)	67.8 (19.9)	74.2 (23.4)	80.2 (26.8)	87.4 (30.8)	90.8 (32.7)	92.1 (33.4)	91.5 (33.1)	88.6 (31.4)	81.7 (27.6)	72.5 (22.5)	65.9 (18.8)	79.7 (26.5)
Daily mean °F (°C)	52.2 (11.2)	55.6 (13.1)	61.4 (16.3)	67.3 (19.6)	75.2 (24.0)	80.8 (27.1)	82.5 (28.1)	82.4 (28.0)	79.1 (26.2)	70.3 (21.3)	60.2 (15.7)	54.4 (12.4)	68.5 (20.3)
Mean daily minimum °F (°C)	40.5 (4.7)	43.5 (6.4)	48.6 (9.2)	54.4 (12.4)	63.0 (17.2)	70.8 (21.6)	73.0 (22.8)	73.2 (22.9)	69.6 (20.9)	58.8 (14.9)	48.0 (8.9)	42.9 (6.1)	57.2 (14.0)
Mean minimum °F (°C)	22.1 (−5.5)	24.5 (−4.2)	29.1 (−1.6)	37.3 (2.9)	48.4 (9.1)	63.0 (17.2)	68.1 (20.1)	66.5 (19.2)	56.8 (13.8)	39.6 (4.2)	29.5 (−1.4)	25.1 (−3.8)	20.2 (−6.6)
Record low °F (°C)	6 (−14)	−2 (−19)	20 (−7)	29 (−2)	34 (1)	46 (8)	57 (14)	57 (14)	40 (4)	29 (−2)	13 (−11)	10 (−12)	−2 (−19)
Average precipitation inches (mm)	4.41 (112)	4.28 (109)	5.24 (133)	3.53 (90)	3.36 (85)	7.76 (197)	7.14 (181)	7.60 (193)	4.91 (125)	3.24 (82)	3.10 (79)	4.24 (108)	58.81 (1,494)
Average precipitation days (≥ 0.01 in)	8.9	8.1	8.0	6.7	7.5	14.3	16.4	14.8	9.0	5.9	6.3	8.3	114.2
Average relative humidity (%)	74.8	72.4	71.6	70.0	72.0	75.7	80.1	80.9	78.4	74.1	76.1	76.4	75.2
Average dew point °F (°C)	41.0 (5.0)	42.4 (5.8)	48.9 (9.4)	54.3 (12.4)	62.2 (16.8)	69.1 (20.6)	72.1 (22.3)	72.3 (22.4)	68.7 (20.4)	57.6 (14.2)	50.0 (10.0)	44.1 (6.7)	56.9 (13.8)
Mean monthly sunshine hours	207.7	209.1	254.2	267	328.6	318	328.6	282.1	261	244.9	189	176.7	3,066.9
Mean daily sunshine hours	6.7	7.4	8.2	8.9	10.6	10.6	10.8	9.1	8.7	7.9	6.3	5.7	8.4
Mean daily daylight hours	10.4	11.1	12	12.9	13.7	14.1	13.9	13.2	12.3	11.4	10.6	10.2	12.1
Average ultraviolet index	5	8	9	10	11	11	11	11	10	8	6	4	9
Source 1: NOAA (relative humidity and dew point 1961−1990)
Source 2: Weather Atlas (sun-daylight) Nomadseason (Average daily maximum UV

== Demographics ==
Historical population
Census	Pop.	Note	%±
1840	1,616		—
1860	1,932		—
1870	2,023		4.7%
1880	2,494		23.3%
1890	2,934		17.6%
1900	2,981		1.6%
1910	5,018		68.3%
1920	5,637		12.3%
1930	10,700		89.8%
1940	16,240		51.8%
1950	27,237		67.7%
1960	48,174		76.9%
1970	72,624		50.8%
1980	81,548		12.3%
1990	124,773		53.0%
2000	150,624		20.7%
2010	181,376		20.4%
2020	196,169		8.2%
2024 (est.)	205,089	▲	4.5%
U.S. Decennial Census; 2010 2020

=== Racial and ethnic composition ===
Tallahassee city, Florida – Racial and ethnic composition Note: the US Census treats Hispanic/Latino as an ethnic category. This table excludes Latinos from the racial categories and assigns them to a separate category. Hispanics/Latinos may be of any race.
Race / Ethnicity (NH = Non-Hispanic)	Pop 2000	Pop 2010	Pop 2020	% 2000	% 2010	% 2020
White alone (NH)	87,047	96,753	94,095	57.79%	53.34%	47.97%
Black or African American alone (NH)	51,025	62,538	67,503	33.88%	34.48%	34.41%
Native American or Alaska Native alone (NH)	349	381	398	0.23%	0.21%	0.20%
Asian alone (NH)	3,575	6,566	8,665	2.37%	3.62%	4.42%
Pacific Islander or Native Hawaiian alone (NH)	77	88	100	0.05%	0.05%	0.05%
Other race alone (NH)	233	373	924	0.15%	0.21%	0.47%
Mixed race or Multiracial (NH)	2,009	3,331	7,821	1.33%	1.84%	3.99%
Hispanic or Latino (any race)	6,309	11,346	16,663	4.19%	6.26%	8.49%
Total	150,324	181,376	196,169	100.00%	100.00%	100.00%

=== 2020 census ===
As of the 2020 United States census, there were 196,169 people, 78,283 households, and 34,639 families residing in the city.

=== 2010 census ===
As of the 2010 United States census, there were 181,376 people, 73,289 households, and 34,516 families residing in the city.

In the 2010 census, 16.7% of which had children under 18 living in them. 27.7% were married couples living together, 14.4% had a female householder with no husband, and 53.7% were non-families. 34.1% of all households were made up of individuals living alone and 6.7% had someone living alone who was 65 years of age or older. The average household size was 2.23 and the average family size was 2.33. Children under the age of 5 were 4.9% of the population, persons under 18 were 16.7% and persons 65 years or older were 10.3%. The median age was 26 years. For every 100 females, there were 89.5 males. For every 100 females age 18 and over, there were 86.7 males.

For 2009–2013, the estimated median household income was $39,524, and the per capita income was $23,778. In 2010, the percentage of persons below the poverty level was estimated at 30.2%.

=== Languages ===
As of 2000, 92.0% of residents spoke English as their first language, while 4.1% spoke Spanish, 0.6% spoke French, and 0.6% spoke German as their mother tongue. In total, 8.0% of the total population spoke languages other than English.

=== Higher learning ===
Educationally, the population of Leon County is the most highly educated population in Florida with 54.4% of the residents over the age of 25 holding a Bachelor's, Master's, professional or doctorate degree. The Florida average is 37.4% and the national average is 33.4%.

== Law, government and politics ==
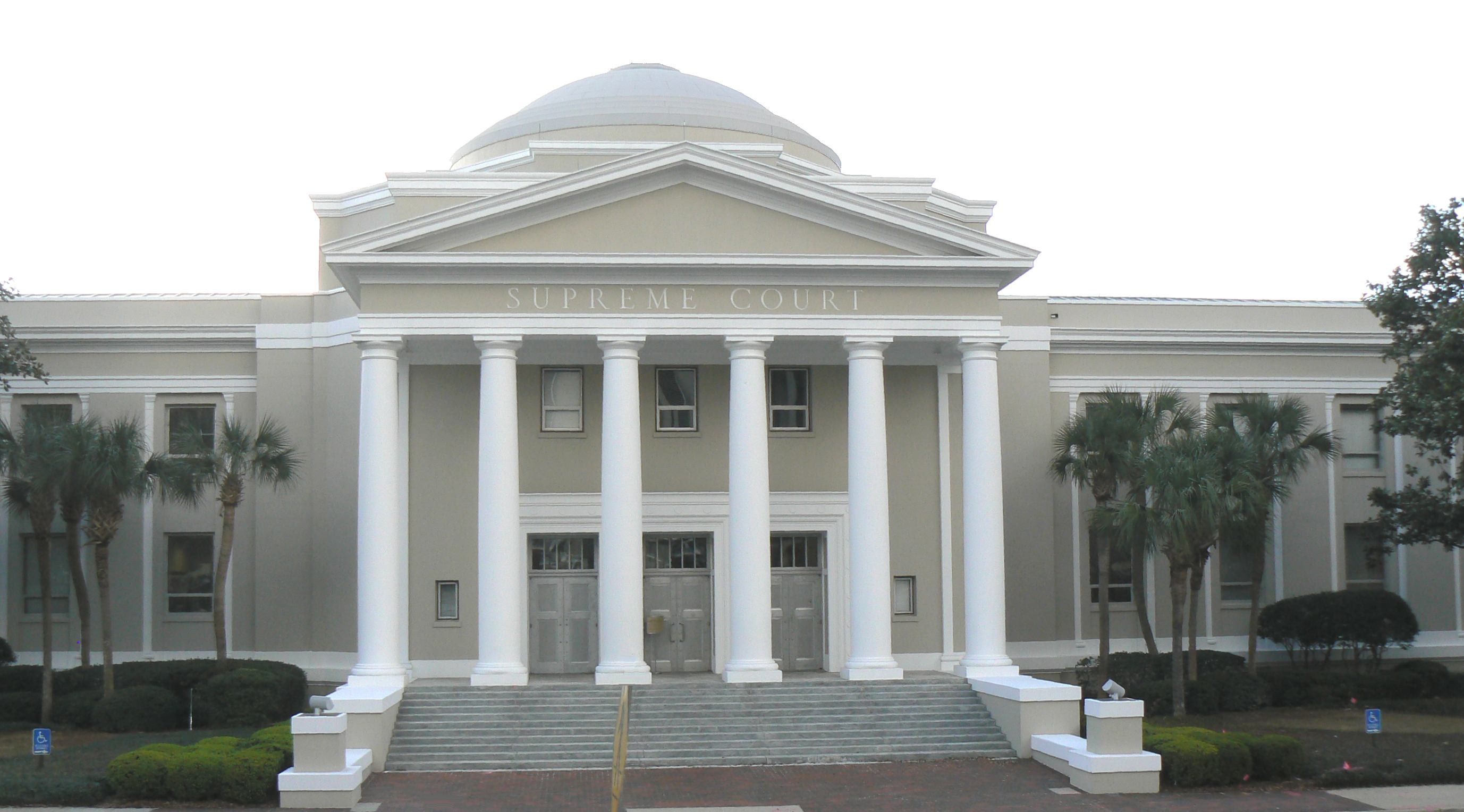
The Florida Supreme Court building

=== Politics ===
Tallahassee has traditionally been a Democratic city, but the party has been supported by different ethnic groups over time, with a major shift in the late 20th century. Leon County has voted Democratic in 24 of the past 29 presidential elections since 1904; but until the late 1960s, most African Americans were disenfranchised from the political system, dating from Jim Crow laws passed by Democrats in Florida (and in all other Southern states) at the turn of the century. At that time, most African Americans were affiliated with the Republican Party, and their disenfranchisement resulted in that party being non-competitive in the region for decades. Subsequently, these demographic groups traded party alignments in the 1960s and 1970s.

Since passage of the Voting Rights Act of 1965 and enforcement of constitutional rights for African Americans, voters in Tallahassee have elected black mayors and black state representatives. It has become one of those Southern U.S. cities that are known for progressive activism. This may be due to the fact that Tallahassee and Leon County are among the highest level of college graduates in the state. In addition, after the realignment of party politics during the late 20th century, most of the African-American population in the city now support Democratic Party candidates.

As of December 2, 2018, there were 112,572 Democrats, 58,083 Republicans, and 44,007 voters who were independent or had other affiliations among the 214,662 voters in Leon County.

Leon County's voter turnout percentage has consistently ranked among the highest of Florida's 67 counties, with a record-setting 86% turnout in the November 2008 general election. The county voted for Barack Obama in the presidential election.

=== Structure of city government ===
Tallahassee has a form of government with an elected mayor of Tallahassee, elected commissioners, and an at-will employed city manager, city departments, and staff.

The city commissioners as of November 9, 2020, were:

- Seat 1 – Jacqueline "Jack" Porter
- Seat 2 – Curtis Richardson
- Seat 3 – Jeremy Matlow
- Seat 4 (Mayor) – John Dailey
- Seat 5 – Dianne Williams-Cox
List of intendants/mayors of Tallahassee, Florida
- 1826 Dr. Charles Haire
- 1827 David Ochiltree
- 1828–1829 John Y. Gary
- 1830 Leslie A. Thompson
- 1831 Charles Austin
- 1832–1833 Leslie A. Thompson
- 1834 Robert J. Hackley
- 1835 William Wilson
- 1836 John Rea
- 1837 William P. Gorman
- 1838 William Hilliard
- 1839 R. F. Ker
- 1840 Leslie A. Thompson
- 1841–1844 Francis W. Eppes
- 1845 James A. Berthelot
- 1846 Simon Towle
- 1847 James Kirksey
- 1848 F. H. Flagg
- 1849 Thomas J. Perkins
- 1850–1851 D. P. Hogue
- 1852 David S. Walker
- 1853 Richard Hayward
- 1854–1855 Thomas Hayward
- 1856–1857 Francis W. Eppes
- 1858–1860 D. P. Hogue
- 1861–1865 P. T. Pearce
- 1866 Francis W. Eppes
- 1867–1868 D. P. Hogue
- 1869–1870 T. P. Tatum
- 1871 C. E. Dyke
- 1872–1874 C. H. Edwards
- 1875 David S. Walker, Jr.
- 1876 Samuel Walker
- 1877 Jesse Bernard
- 1878–1879 David S. Walker, Jr.
- 1880 Henry Bernreuter
- 1881 Edward Lewis
- 1882 John W. Nash
- 1883 Edward Lewis
- 1884–1885 Charles C. Pearce
- 1886 George W. Walker
- 1887 A. J. Fish
- 1888–1889 R. B. Forman
- 1890–1894 R. B. Carpenter
- 1895–1896 Jesse T. Bernard
- 1897 R. A. Shine
- 1898–1902 R. B. Gorman
- 1903–1904 William L. Moor
- 1905 John W. Henderson
- 1906 F. C. Gilmore
- 1907 W. M. McIntosh, Jr.
- 1908 F. C. Gilmore
- 1909 Francis B. Winthrop
- 1910–1917 D. M. Lowry
- 1918 J. R. McDaniel
- 1919–1921 Guyte P. McCord
- 1922–1923 A. P. McCaskill
- 1924–1925 B. A. Meginniss
- 1926 W. Theo Proctor
- 1927 B.A. Meginniss
- 1928–1929 W. Theo Proctor
- 1930 G. E. Lewis
- 1931 Frank D. Moor
- 1932–1933 W. L. Marshall
- 1934 J. L. Fain
- 1935 Leonard A. Wesson
- 1936 H. J. Yaeger
- 1937 L. A. Wesson
- 1938 J. R. Jinks
- 1939 S. A. Wahnish
- 1940 F. C. Moor
- 1941 Charles S. Ausley
- 1942 Jack W. Simmons
- 1943 A. R. Richardson
- 1944 Charles S. Ausley
- 1945 Ralph E. Proctor
- 1946 Fred S. Winterle
- 1947 George I. Martin
- 1948 Fred N. Lowry
- 1949–1950 Robert C. Parker
- 1951 W. H. Cates
- 1952 B. A. Ragsdale
- 1953 William T. Mayo
- 1954 H. G. Esterwood
- 1954 H. C. Summitt
- 1955–1956 J. T. Williams
- 1956 Fred S. Winterle
- 1956–1957 John Y. Humphress
- 1957 J. W. Cordell
- 1958 Davis H. Atkinson
- 1959 Hugh E. Williams, Jr.
- 1960 George S. Taft
- 1961 J. W. Cordell
- 1962 Davis H. Atkinson
- 1963 S. E. Teague, Jr.
- 1964 Hugh E. Williams, Jr.
- 1965 George S. Taft
- 1966 W. H. Cates
- 1967 John A. Rudd, Sr.
- 1968 Gene Berkowitz
- 1969 Spurgeon Camp
- 1970 Lee A. Everhart
- 1971 Gene Berkowitz
- 1972 James R. Ford
- 1973 Joan Heggen
- 1974–1975 John R. Jones
- 1976 James R. Ford
- 1977–1978 Neal D. Sapp
- 1979 Sheldon A. Hilaman
- 1980–1981 Hurley W. Rudd
- 1982 James R. Ford
- 1983 Carol Bellamy
- 1984 Kent Spriggs
- 1985 Hurley W. Rudd
- 1986 Jack McClean
- 1987–1988 Betty Harley
- 1988–1990 Dorothy Inman
- 1990 Steve Meisberg
- 1991–1992 Debbie Lightsey
- 1993–1994 Dorothy Inman-Crews
- 1994–1995 Penny Herman
- 1995–1996 Scott Maddox
- 1996–1997 Ron Weaver
- 1997–2003 Scott Maddox
- 2003–2014 John Marks
- 2014–2018 Andrew Gillum
- 2018–present John Dailey

=== Federal representation and offices ===
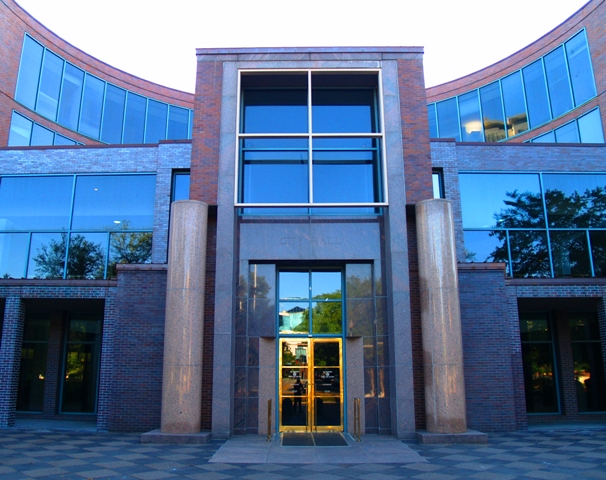
Tallahassee City Hall

Tallahassee is part of Florida's 2nd congressional district.

The United States Postal Service operates post offices in Tallahassee. The Tallahassee Main Post Office is at 2800 South Adams Street. Other post offices in the city limits include Centerville Station, Leon Station, Park Avenue Station, and Westside Station.

The National Oceanic and Atmospheric Administration maintains a National Weather Service in Tallahassee. Their coverage-warning area includes the eastern Florida Panhandle and adjacent Gulf of Mexico waters, the north-central Florida peninsula, and parts of southeastern Alabama and southwestern Georgia.

The 81st Regional Support Command of the United States Army Reserve (USAR) has an Army Reserve Center at 4307 Jackson Bluff Road.

The Naval and Marine Corps Reserve Center (NMCRC) is at 2910 Roberts Avenue host the United States Navy Reserve Navy Operational Support Center Tallahassee (NOSC Tallahassee) and the United States Marine Corps Reserve 2nd Platoon, Company E, Anti-Terrorism Battalion and 3rd Platoon, Company E, Anti-Terrorism Battalion.

=== Consolidation ===
Voters of Leon County have gone to the polls four times to vote on consolidation of Tallahassee and Leon County governments into one jurisdiction combining law enforcement, fire protection and other city services with already shared (consolidated) Leon County Emergency Medical Services. Tallahassee's city limits would increase from 103.1 square miles (267 km^{2}) to 702 square miles (1,820 km^{2}). Roughly 36 percent of Leon County's 265,714 residents live outside the Tallahassee city limits.

Each time, the measure was rejected:

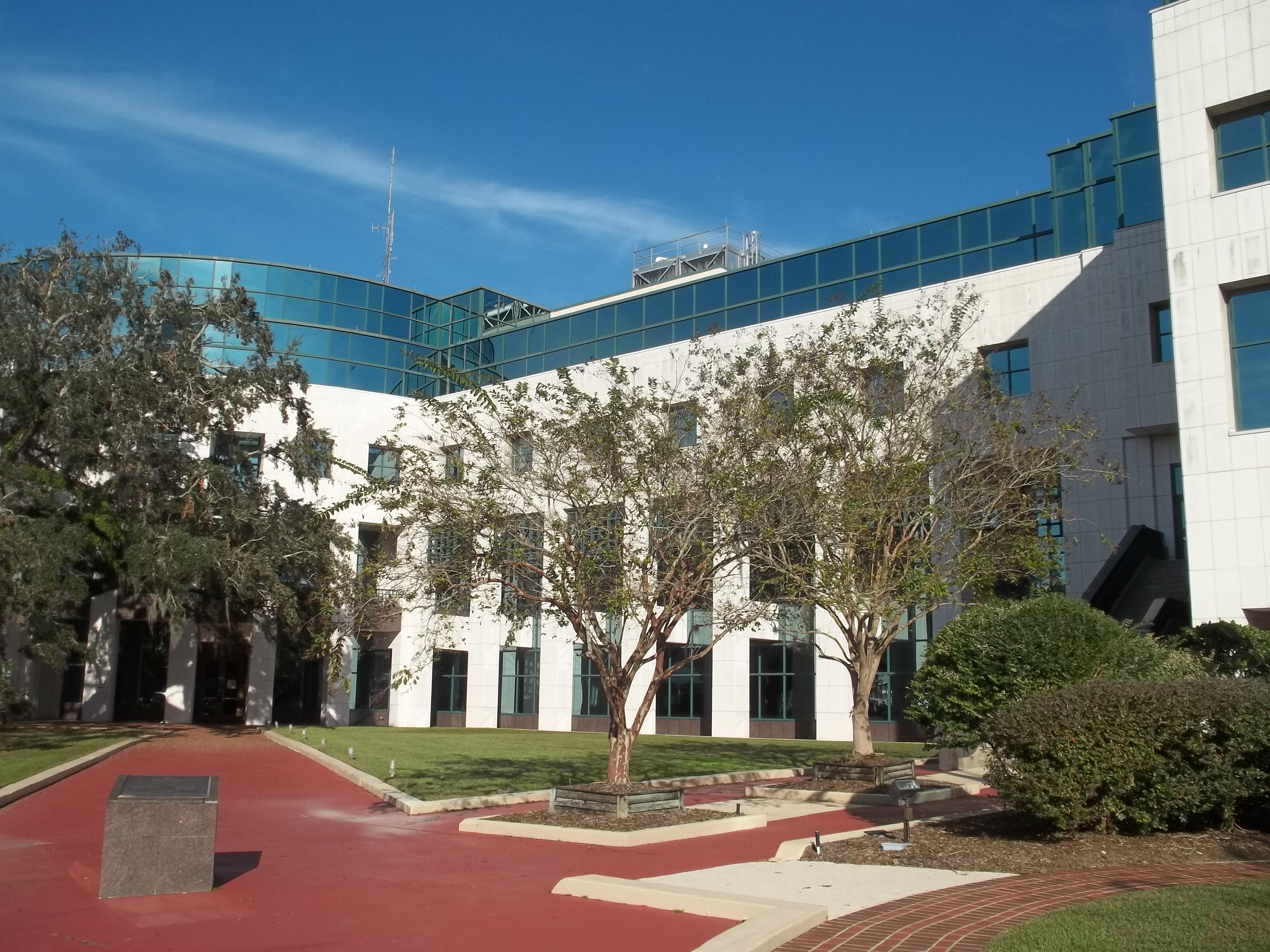
The Leon County Courthouse

Leon County Voting On Consolidation
Year	FOR	AGAINST
1971	10,381 (41.32%)	14,740 (58.68%)
1973	11,056 (46.23%)	12,859 (53.77%)
1976	20,336 (45.01%)	24,855 (54.99%)
1992	37,062 (39.8%)	56,070 (60.2%)

The proponents of consolidation have stated the new jurisdiction would attract business by its size. Merging governments would cut government waste, duplication of services, etc. However, Professor Richard Feiock of the Department of Public Administration of Korea University and the Askew School of Public Administration and Policy of Florida State University states that no discernible relationship exists between consolidation and the local economy.

=== Flag ===
The former flag of Tallahassee was vaguely similar to the flag of Florida, a white saltire on a blue field, with the city's coat of arms, featuring the cupola of the old capitol building, at the center. The flag is an homage to the Scottish and Ulster-Scots Presbyterian heritage of the original founders of the city, most of whom were settlers from North Carolina whose ancestors had either come to America directly from Scotland, or were Presbyterians of Scottish descent from County Down and County Antrim in what has since become Northern Ireland. The current flag incorporates a stylized 5-point star and the city name on a white background.

== Education ==
=== Primary and secondary ===
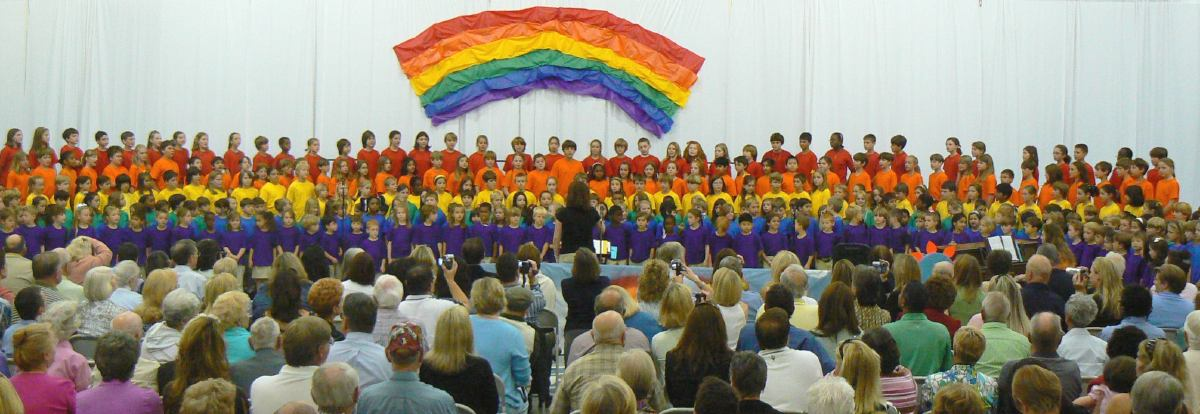
Lower School students at Maclay School celebrating Grandparents Day in 2008

Tallahassee anchors the Leon County School District. As of the 2009 school year Leon County Schools had an estimated 32,796 students, 2209 teachers and 2100 administrative and support personnel. The superintendent of schools is Rocky Hanna. Leon County public school enrollment continues to grow steadily (up approximately 1% per year since the 1990–91 school year). The dropout rate for grades 9–12 improved to 2.2% in the 2007–2008 school year, the third time in the past four years the dropout rate has been below 3%.

To gauge performance the State of Florida rates all public schools according to student achievement on the state-sponsored Florida Comprehensive Assessment Test (FCAT). Seventy-nine percent of Leon County Public Schools received an A or B grade in the 2008–2009 school year. The overall district grade assigned to the Leon County Schools is "A". Students in the Leon County School District continued to score favorably in comparison to Florida and national averages in the SAT and ACT student assessment tests. The Leon County School District has consistently scored at or above the average for districts statewide in total ACT and SAT mean composite scores.

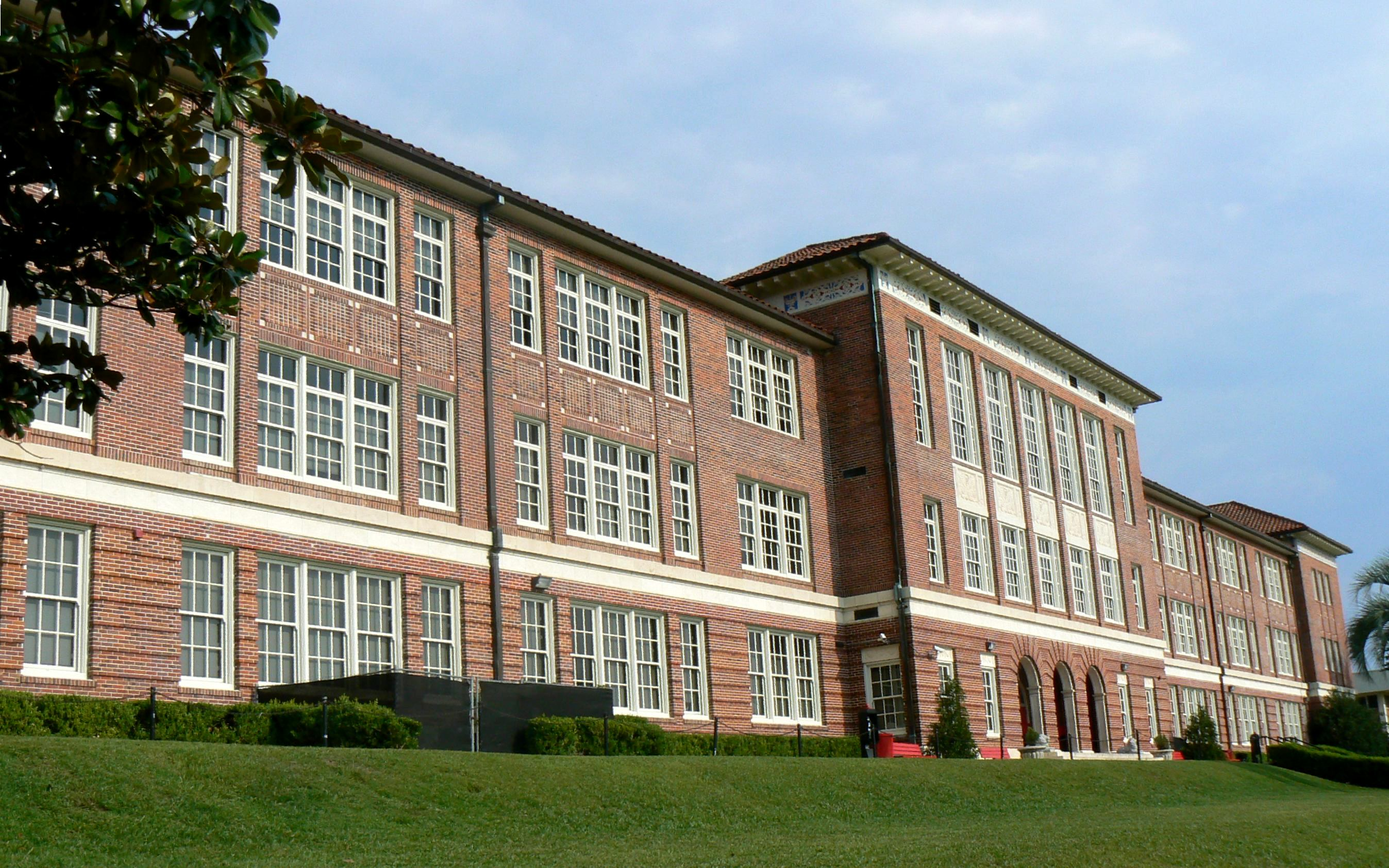
Leon High School

Leon County high schools

- Lawton Chiles High School
- Amos P. Godby High School
- Leon High School
- Lincoln High School
- Lively Technical Center
- James S. Rickards High School
- SAIL High School

Public schools belonging to universities

- Florida State University Schools ("Florida High") (K–12)
- Florida A&M University Developmental Research School (K–12)

Charter schools

- Governor's Charter Academy (GCA) (K–8) – Established in August 2012.
- School of Arts and Sciences (SAS) (K–8) – Established in 1999
- Tallahassee School of Math and Science (TSMS) (K–8) – It was previously known as Stars Middle School and only served middle school. In 2014 it received a new charter, adopted its current name, and expanded to elementary grades.
- Tallahassee Classical School - Established in 2017.

Private schools

- Atlantis Academy (K–12) – Established in 1976.
- Betton Hills Preparatory School (Pre-K2/3, Pre-K4, VPK, K-2)
- Christ Classical Academy (Pre-K–8)
- Community Christian School (K-12)
- Community Leadership Academy (Pre-K–12) - Established in 2009.
- St. John Paul II Catholic High School
- Maclay School (PK3–12)
- North Florida Christian School
- Cornerstone Learning Community (PK3–8)
- Trinity Catholic School (PK–3, K–8).
- Holy Comforter Episcopal School (PK3–8).
- Woodland Hall Academy (K–12) – CLOSED
- The Magnolia School, K–8

Virtual schools

- Franklin Virtual High School

=== Higher education ===
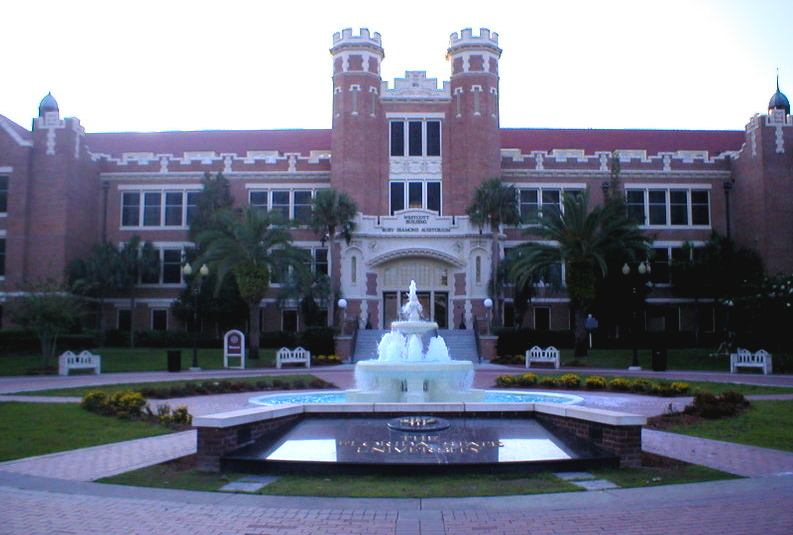
The Westcott Plaza at Florida State University

==== Florida State University ====
Florida State University (commonly referred to as Florida State or FSU) is an American public space-grant and sea-grant research university. Florida State is on a 1,391.54-acre (5.631 km2) campus in the state capital of Tallahassee, Florida, United States. It is a senior member of the State University System of Florida. Founded in 1851, it is on the oldest continuous site of higher education in the state of Florida.

The university is classified as a Research University with Very High Research by the Carnegie Foundation for the Advancement of Teaching. The university comprises 16 separate colleges and more than 110 centers, facilities, labs and institutes that offer more than 360 programs of study, including professional school programs. The university has an annual budget of over $1.7 billion. Florida State is home to Florida's only National Laboratory – the National High Magnetic Field Laboratory and is the birthplace of the commercially viable anti-cancer drug Taxol. Florida State University also operates The John & Mable Ringling Museum of Art, the State Art Museum of Florida and one of the nation's largest museum/university complexes.

The university is accredited by the Southern Association of Colleges and Schools (SACS). Florida State University is home to nationally ranked programs in many academic areas, including law, business, engineering, medicine, social policy, film, music, theater, dance, visual art, political science, psychology, social work, and the sciences.

Florida Governor Rick Scott and the state legislature designated Florida State University as one of two "preeminent" state universities in the spring of 2013 among the twelve universities of the State University System of Florida.

FSU's intercollegiate sports teams, commonly known by their Florida State Seminoles nickname, compete in National Collegiate Athletic Association (NCAA) Division I and the Atlantic Coast Conference (ACC). In their 113-year history, Florida State's varsity sports teams have won 20 national athletic championships and Seminole athletes have won 78 individual NCAA national championships.

==== Florida A&M University ====
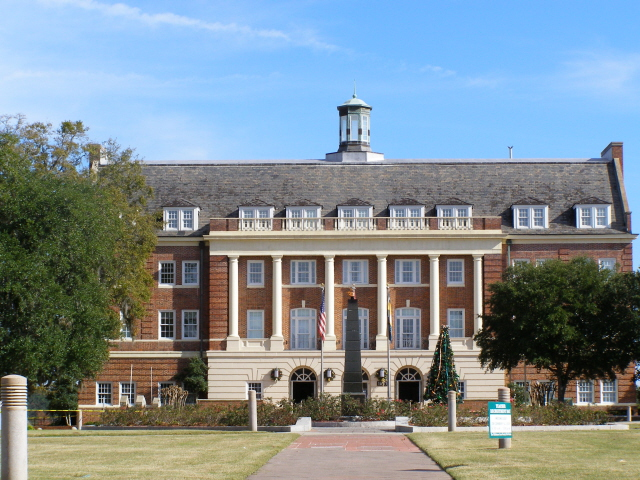
Florida A&M University's Lee Hall Auditorium

Founded on October 3, 1887, Florida A&M University (commonly referred to as FAMU) is a public, historically black university and land-grant university that is part of the State University System of Florida and is accredited by the Southern Association of Colleges and Schools. FAMU's main campus comprises 156 buildings spread over 422 acres (1.7 km^{2}) atop the highest geographic hill in Tallahassee. The university also has several satellite campuses, including a site in Orlando where its College of Law is located and sites in Miami, Jacksonville and Tampa for its pharmacy program. Florida A&M University offers 54 bachelor's degrees and 29 master's degrees. The university has 7 schools, 7 colleges and one institute. The Institute of Public Health is housed within the College of Pharmacy, but there is actually a network of 16 specialized centers and research institutes.

FAMU offers 10 Doctor of Philosophy (Ph.D.) programs: biomedical engineering, chemical engineering, civil engineering, electrical engineering, mechanical engineering, industrial engineering, physics, pharmaceutical sciences, educational leadership, and environmental sciences. Other Doctoral degrees include Doctor of Public Health (DrPH), Doctor of Physical Therapy (DPT), Doctor of Pharmacy (PharmD), Juris Doctor (J.D.) and Doctor of Nursing Practice (DNP). The top undergraduate programs are health science, business, criminal justice, agriculture & food science and education. FAMU's top graduate programs include health sciences, engineering, business, and public health.

==== Tallahassee State College ====
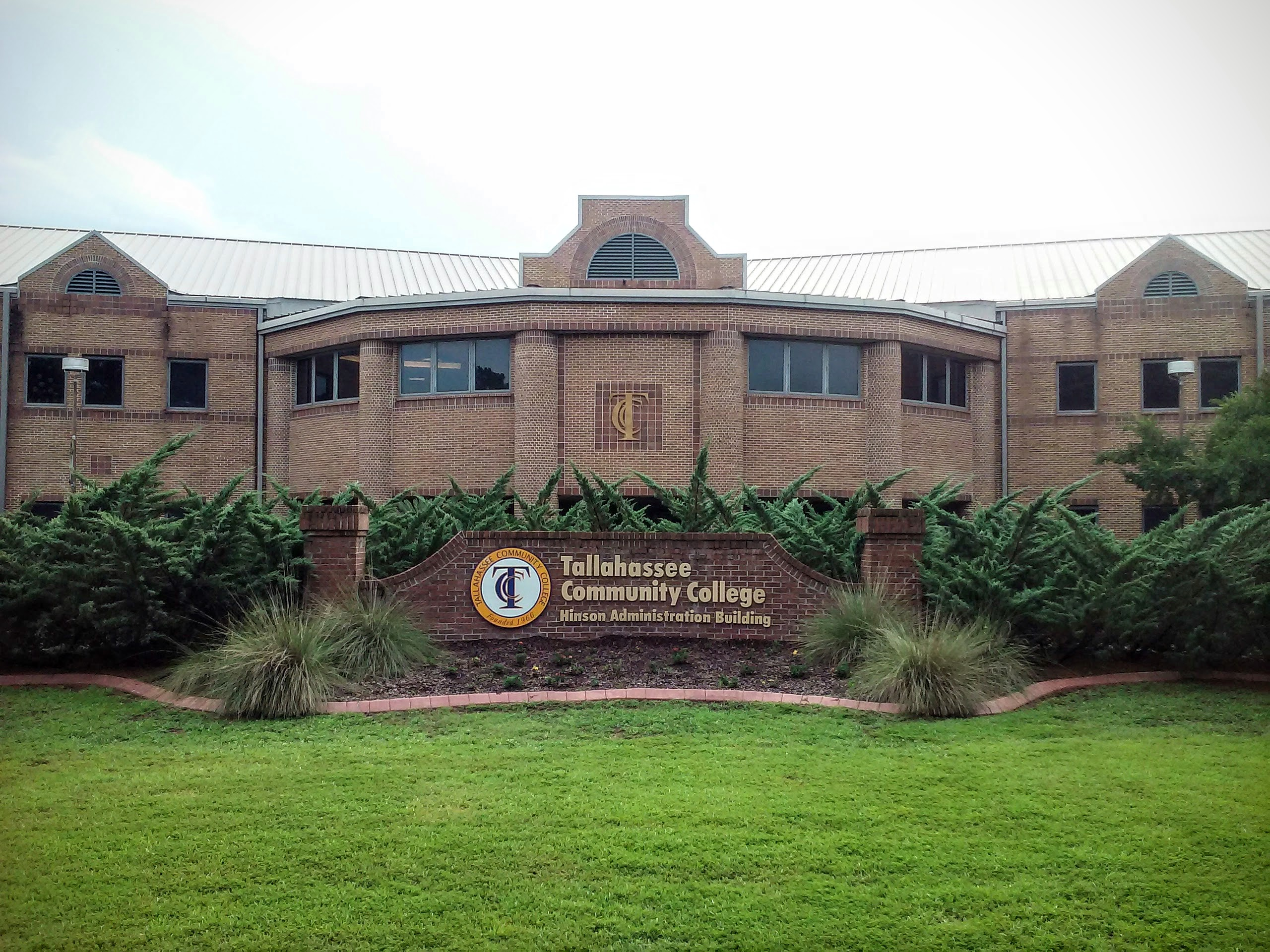
The Hinson Administration Building at Tallahassee State College

Tallahassee State College (TSC) is a member of the Florida College System. Tallahassee State College is accredited by the Florida Department of Education and the Southern Association of Colleges and Schools. Its primary campus is on a 270-acre (1.092 km2) campus in Tallahassee. The institution was founded in 1966 by the Florida Legislature.

TSC offers Bachelor's of Science, Associate of Arts, Associate of Science, and Associate of Applied Sciences degrees. In 2013, the school (then known as Tallahassee Community College) was listed first in the nation in graduating students with A.A. degrees. TSC is also the No. 1 transfer school in the nation to Florida State University and Florida A&M University. As of fall 2015, TSC reported 38,017 students. In 2024, Tallahassee Community College was approved to be renamed Tallahassee State College, and the name change took effect on July 1, 2024.

In partnership with Florida State University, and Florida A&M University Tallahassee State College offers the TSC2FSU, and TSC2FAMU program. This program provides guaranteed admission into Florida State University and Florida A&M University for TSC Associate in Arts degree graduates.

==== Other colleges ====
- Barry University School of Adult and Continuing Education – Tallahassee Campus
- Embry-Riddle Aeronautical University
- Flagler College – Tallahassee Campus
- Keiser University – Tallahassee Campus
- Lewis M. Lively Area Vocational-Technical School
- Saint Leo University – Tallahassee Campus

== Economy ==
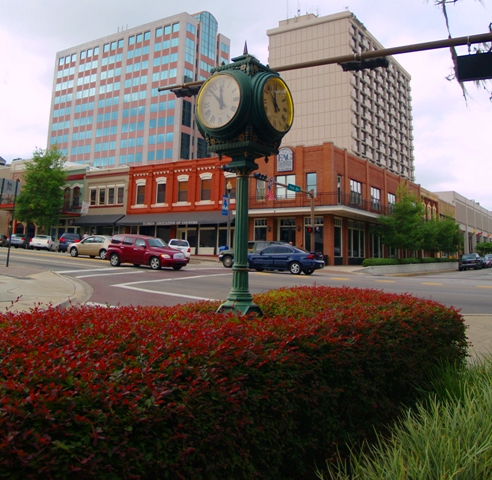
The old clock at the corner of Park Avenue and Monroe Street in Downtown Tallahassee

Companies based in Tallahassee include: Citizens Property Insurance Corporation, the Municipal Code Corporation, the State Board of Administration of Florida (SBA), the Mainline Information Systems, and United Solutions Company.

=== Employment ===
As of 2024, the unemployment rate in Tallahassee was 3.3% and per capita personal income was $55,363; Tallahassee's top employers were:

Rank	Employer	Employees in 2024	Employees in 2015	2024 Share	2015 Share
1	State of Florida	▲27,748	19,442	▲39.85%	35.44%
2	Florida State University	▲15,455	14,378	▼22.19%	26.22%
3	Tallahassee Memorial Hospital	▲6,000	4,583	▲8.61%	8.36%
4	Leon County School Board	▼4,300	5,383	▼6.17%	9.81%
5	City of Tallahassee	▲2,981	2,811	▼4.28%	5.13%
6	Publix	▲2,702	2,200	▼3.88%	4.01%
7	Walmart	▲2,500	1,300	▲3.59%	3,15%
8	Florida A&M University	▲2,429	1,767	▲3.49%	3.22%
9	Amazon	▲2,256	0	▲3.24%	.00%
10	Leon County	▲1,807	1,172	▼2.59%	3.12%

== Arts and culture ==
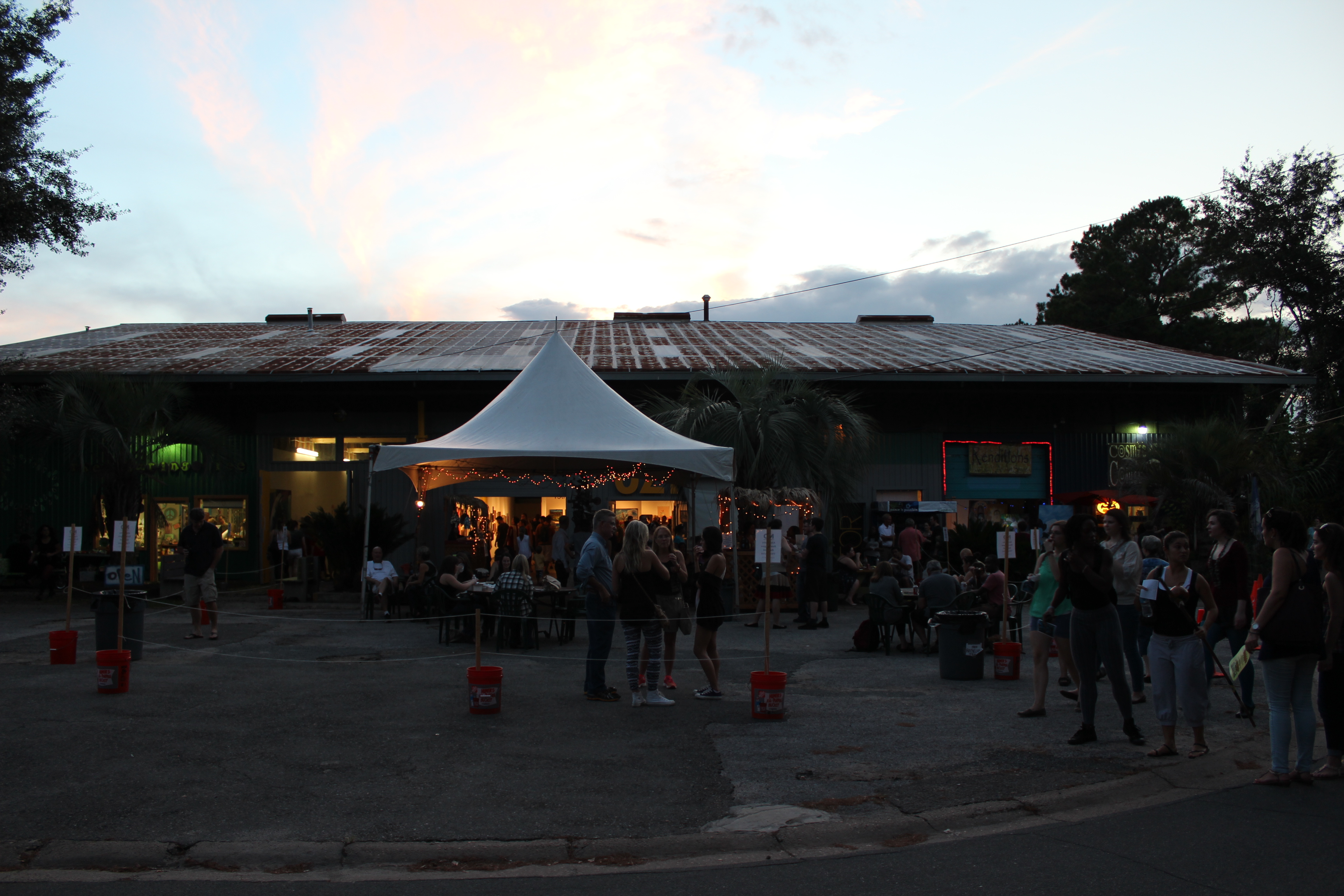
Railroad Square is a popular spot for students and residents of Tallahassee, especially on the first Friday of every month when all the galleries are open to the public.

=== Entertainment and performing arts ===
Tallahassee is home to many entertainment venues, theaters, museums, parks, and performing arts centers, including the Railroad Square Art Park.

=== Museums ===
Tallahassee is known for its many museums. It is home to the Museum of Fine Arts at Florida State University, Tallahassee Museum, Goodward Museum & Gardens, Museum of Florida History, Mission San Luis de Apalachee, Tallahassee Automobile Museum, Old Capitol Museum, Knott House Museum, and The Grove.

=== Music ===
The first notable musician in Tallahassee was Ray Charles, raised in Greenville. Between terms at the Florida School for the Deaf and Blind, he visited family in Tallahassee and performed in Frenchtown.

George Clinton, founder of Parliament-Funkadelic, has lived in Tallahassee since 1994.

Faheem Rashad Najm, better known as T-Pain, was born and raised in Tallahassee. He is known for popularizing the creative use of the Auto-Tune pitch correction effect.

Emo music group Mayday Parade originated in Tallahassee and several members still live there.

Post-grunge band Creed formed in Tallahassee during 1994.

=== Festivals and events ===
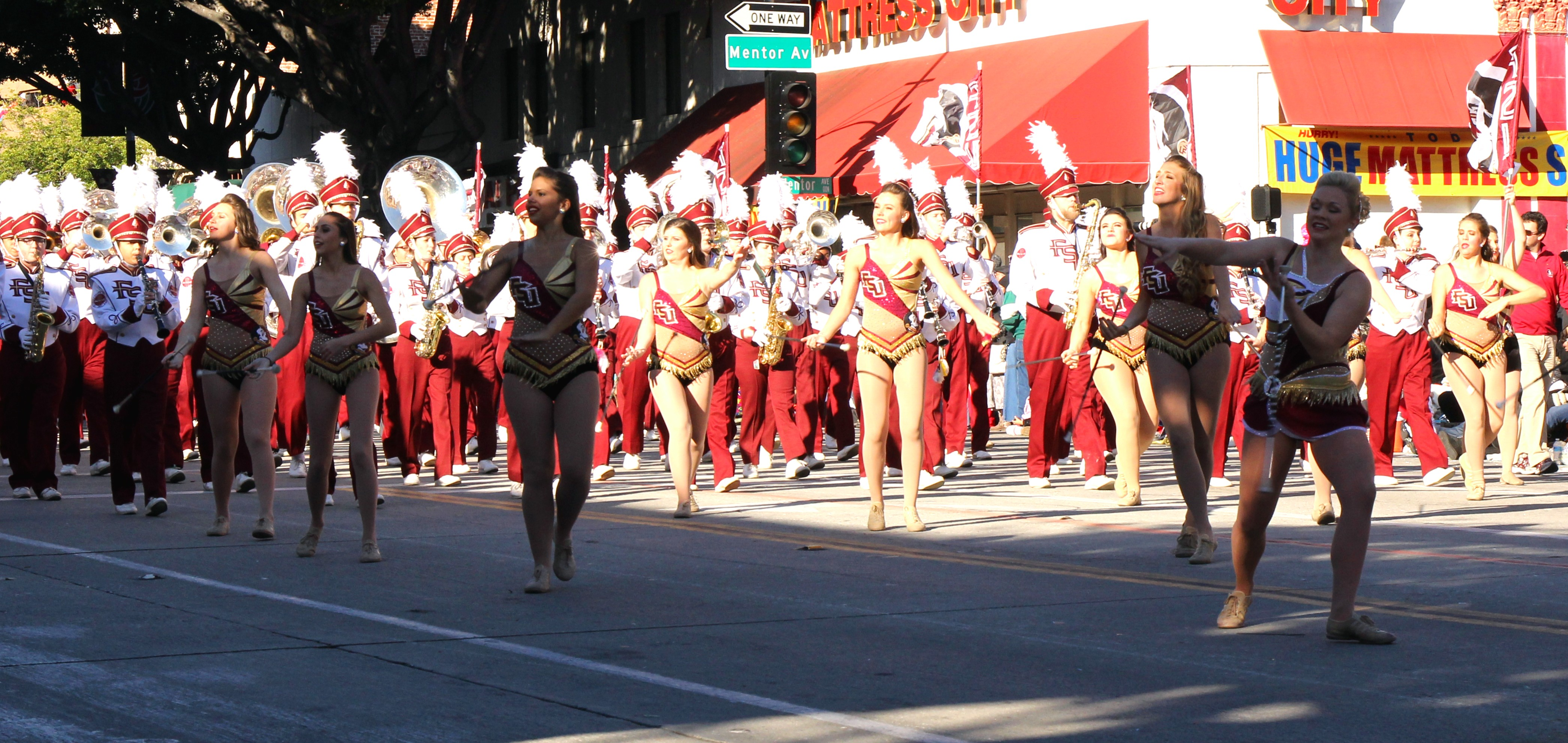
FSU Marching Chiefs and Cheerleaders performing in a parade in Downtown Tallahassee

- Downtown Getdown (Florida State Seminoles Pep Rally)
- First Friday festivals at Railroad Square
- Greek Food Festival
- Springtime Tallahassee
- Tallahassee Wine and Food Festival
- Winter Festival

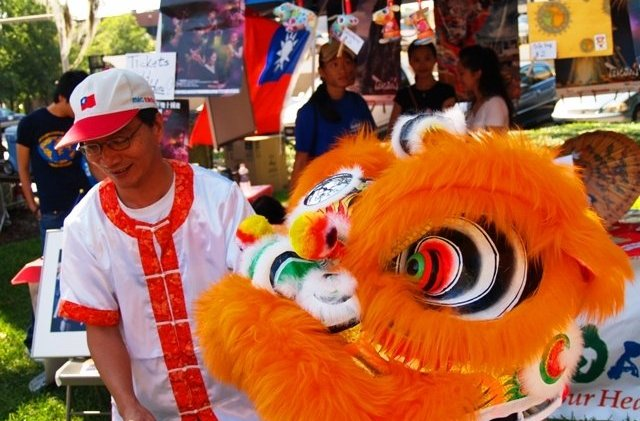
The Tallahassee Asian Festival

== Sports ==
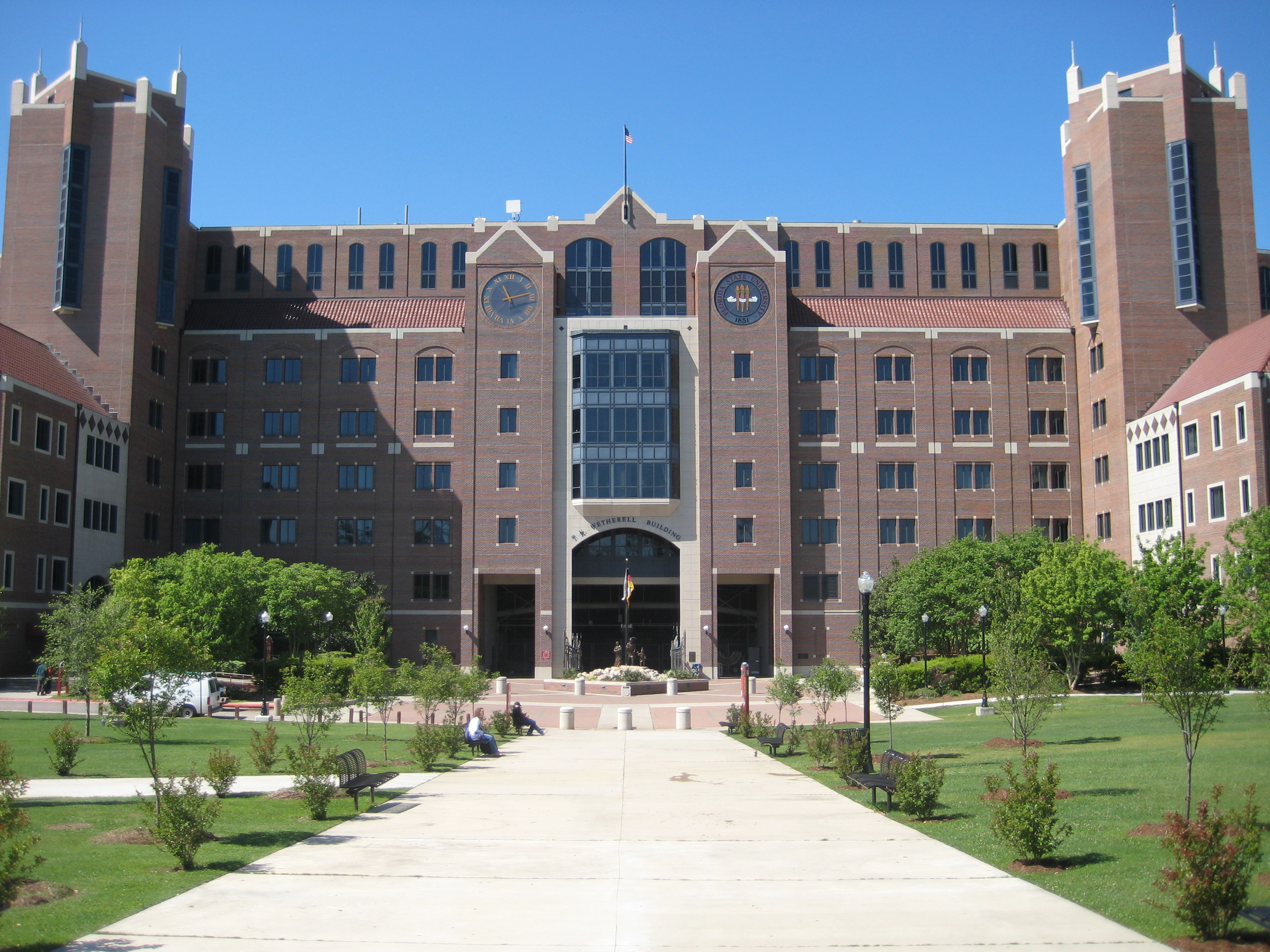
FSU's Doak Campbell Stadium

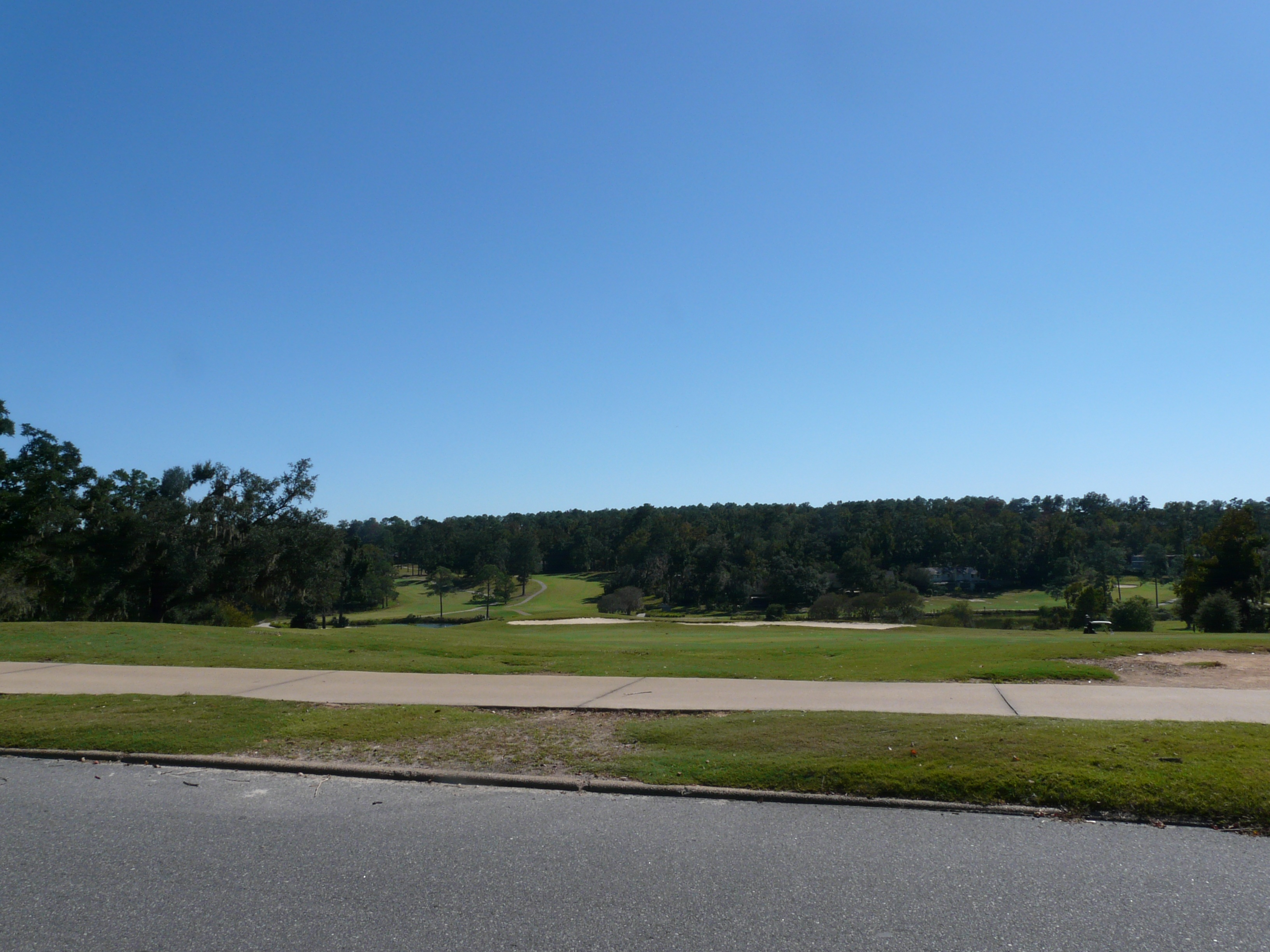
Hilaman Golf Course

=== Florida State Seminoles ===
In 2016- 2017, the Florida State Seminoles of Florida State University generated the thirteenth-most revenue in collegiate athletics with $144,514,413 of total revenue.

Teams	Division	Conference	Venue	Capacity
Florida State Seminoles football	D-1 (FBS)	ACC	Doak Campbell Stadium	79,560
Florida State Seminoles men's basketball	D-I	ACC	Donald L. Tucker Center	12,500
Florida State Seminoles women's basketball	D-I	ACC	Donald L. Tucker Center	12,500
Florida State Seminoles baseball	D-I	ACC	Dick Howser Stadium	6,700
Florida State Seminoles softball	D-I	ACC	JoAnne Graf Field	1,000
Florida State Seminoles women's soccer	D-1	ACC	Seminole Soccer Complex	2,000
Florida A&M Rattlers	D-1	SWAC	Bragg Memorial Stadium	25,500
Florida A&M Rattlers men's basketball	D-I	SWAC	Teaching Arena	8,470

=== Other ===
Club	Sport	League	Years active	Venue
Tallahassee Tiger Sharks	Ice hockey	ECHL	1994–2001	Donald L. Tucker Center
Tallahassee Scorpions	Indoor soccer	EISL	1997–1998	Donald L. Tucker Center
Tallahassee Thunder	American football	Arena football	2000–2002	Donald L. Tucker Center
Tallahassee Titans	American football	AIFL	2007	Donald L. Tucker Center
Tallahassee Tigers	Basketball	ABA	2007	Donald L. Tucker Center
Tallahassee SC	Soccer	NPSL	2018–	Gene Cox Stadium

== Media ==
=== Print ===
- The Tallahassee Democrat, Tallahassee's largest newspaper, published daily
- The FSView & Florida Flambeau, covers Florida State University
- The Talon, covers Tallahassee State College
- The Famuan, covers Florida A&M University

=== Television ===
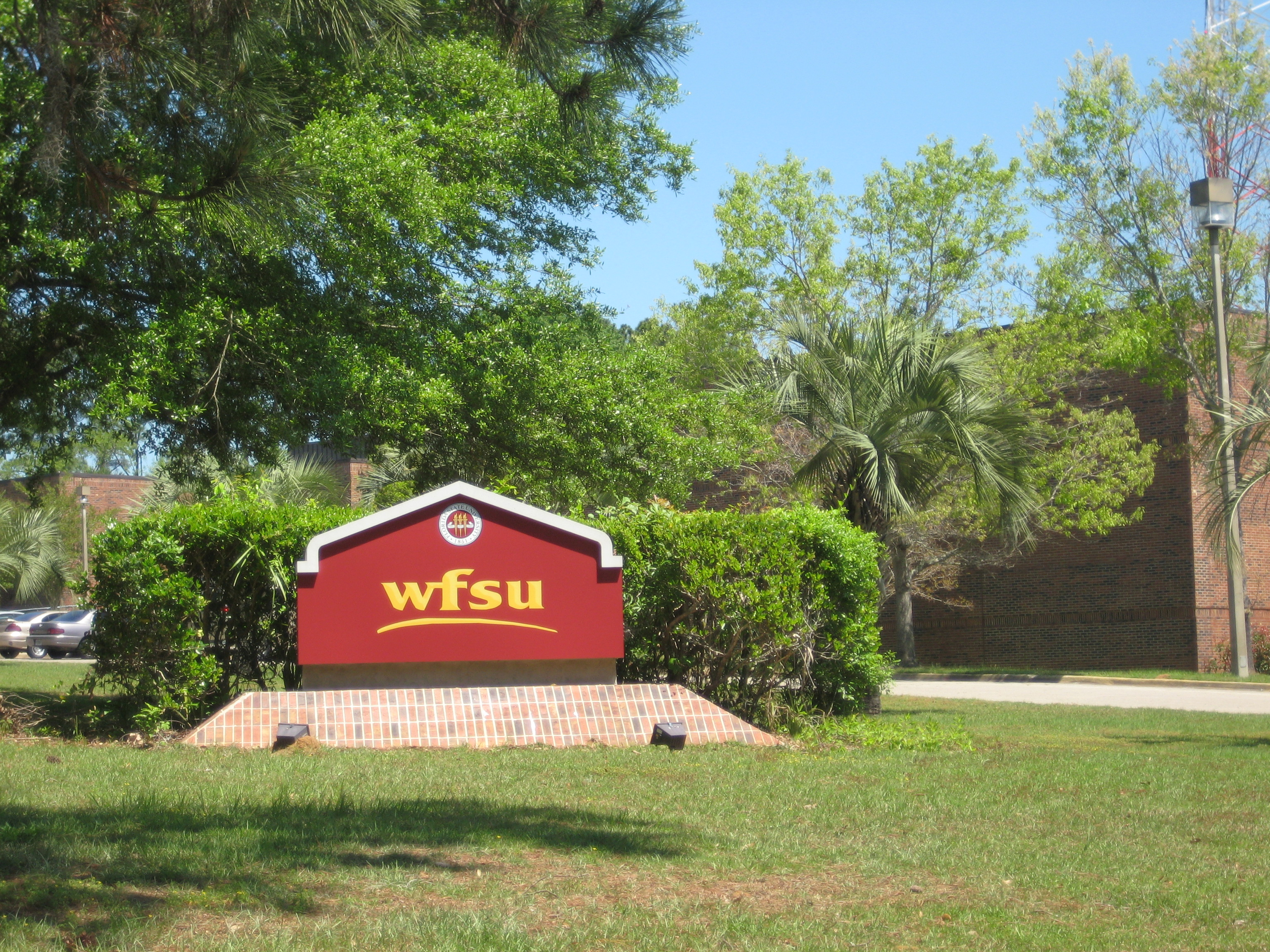
WFSU Building

- WCTV (CBS) channel 6.1, (MeTV) channel 6.2, (The365) channel 6.3, (ION) channel 6.4, (Justice) channel 6.5, (MyTV) channel 6.6, (Shop LC) channel 6.7, licensed to Thomasville, Georgia
- WFSU-TV (PBS) channel 11.1, (Florida Channel) channel 11.2, (Create) channel 11.3, (Kids 360) channel 11.4
- WTFL-LD (Telemundo) channel 15.1, (Start TV) channel 15.2, (Catchy Comedy) channel 15.3
- WTLF (CW) channel 24.1, (Comet) channel 24.2, (Roar) channel 24.3, (Nest) channel 24.4, (Antenna TV) 24.5
- WTXL-TV (ABC) channel 27.1, (Bounce) channel 27.2, (Grit) channel 27.3, (Mystery) channel 27.4, (CourtTV) channel 27.5, (Busted) channel 27.6, (HSN) channel 27.7
- WXTL-LD (Daystar) channel 36.1, (Daystar Espanol) channel 36.2
- WNXG-LD channel 38 (WCTV simulcast channels 6.1 - 6.6 in ATSC 3.0)
- WTWC-TV (NBC) channel 40.1, (Fox) channel 40.2, (Charge) channel 40.3
- WVUP-CD (CTN) channel 45.1, (CTNi) channel 45.3, (Buzzer) channel 45.4, (Biz TV) channel 45.5
- WTLH (H&I) channel 49.1, (CW) channel 49.2, (Comet) channel 49.3, licensed to Bainbridge, Georgia
- WFXU (Independent and My Network TV) channel 57.1, licensed to Live Oak

=== Radio ===
- WANM, Soul/R&B music
- WAYT-FM, contemporary Christian music
- WBZE-FM, adult contemporary music
- WDXD-LP, classic country music
- WFLA-FM, news/talk
- WFSQ-FM, classical music
- WFSU-FM, news/talk
- WGLF-FM, classic rock music
- WGMY-FM, Top 40 music
- WHTF-FM, Top 40 music
- WTLY, adult contemporary music
- WTNT-FM, country music
- WVFS-FM, college/alternative music
- WVFT, news/talk
- WWLD, hip-hop music
- WWOF-FM, country music
- WXSR-FM, rock music

== Public services ==
The Public Safety Complex at 911 Easterwood Drive is a joint venture between Leon County and the City of Tallahassee. The facility serves multiple purposes and was designed to withstand an F4 tornado or a Category 3 hurricane. It was completed in 2013 with a budget of almost $30 million using concrete forms and structural steel with brick masonry exteriors. Most of the 90,000 square feet (8,400 m^{2}) has raised flooring and laminated glass windows.

The site also contains an EMS logistics building and land for a future fire station.

The Consolidated Dispatch Agency (CDA) in the Public Safety Complex acts as a centralized hub for 911 calls, providing faster, more efficient emergency responses by uniting police, fire, and EMS. Key benefits include improved coordination between agencies, quicker processing of emergency calls, enhanced responder safety, and more accurate, faster dispatching of the closest units to crises.

In addition to the CDA, the building contains offices for the city's Regional Transportation Management, EMS, emergency operations and the fire department headquarters.

=== Law enforcement ===
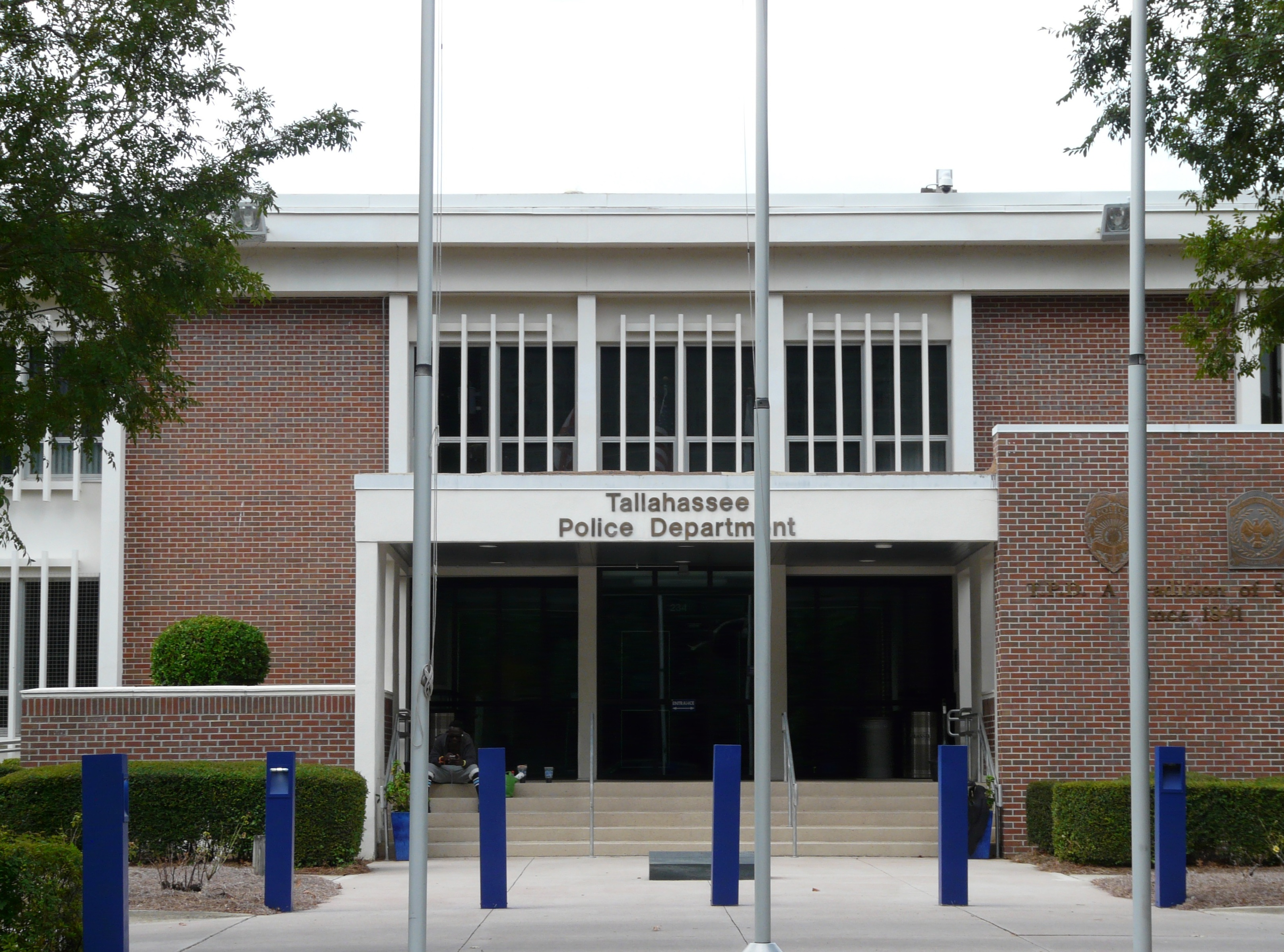
Tallahassee Police Department on Seventh Avenue

Established in 1826, the Tallahassee Police Department once claimed to be the oldest police department in the Southern United States and the second-oldest in the U.S., preceded only by the Philadelphia Police Department (established in 1758). The Boston Police Department was established in 1838 and larger East Coast cities followed with New York City and Baltimore in 1845. However, this is proven incorrect. Pensacola, Florida, for example, had a municipal police force as early as 1821.

There are over 800 sworn law enforcement officers in Tallahassee. Law enforcement services are provided by the Tallahassee Police Department, the Leon County Sheriff's Office, the Florida Department of Law Enforcement, Florida Capitol Police, Florida State University Police Department, Florida A&M University Police Department, the Tallahassee State College Police Department, the Florida Highway Patrol, and the Florida Fish and Wildlife Conservation Commission.

The Tallahassee Growth Management Building Inspection Division is responsible for issuing permits and performing inspections of public and private buildings in the city limits. These duties include the enforcement of the Florida Building Codes and the Florida Fire Protection Codes. These standards are present to protect life and property. The Tallahassee Building Department is one of 13 Accredited Building Departments in the United States.

The Federal Bureau of Investigation, United States Marshals Service, Immigration and Customs Enforcement, Bureau of Alcohol, Tobacco, Firearms and Explosives, Secret Service and Drug Enforcement Administration have offices in Tallahassee. The Federal Correctional Institution, Tallahassee and the United States District Court for the Northern District of Florida are based in Tallahassee.

=== Fire & emergency protection ===
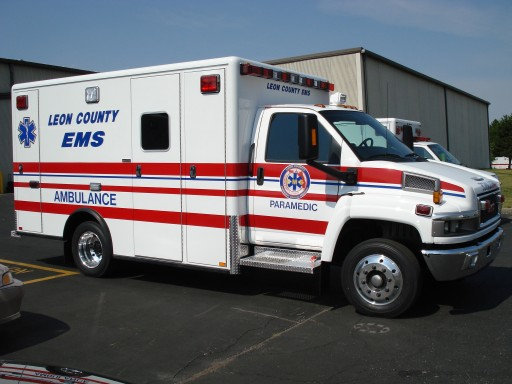
A Leon County EMS vehicle

- The Tallahassee Fire Department provides fire protection and emergency response for Tallahassee, as well as all unincorporated areas of Leon County. Six volunteer fire departments within unincorporated areas of Leon County supplement the response of Leon County EMS and the TFD and exist to provide more timely responses.
- Leon County Emergency Medical Services provides emergency response and transport using Advanced life support for all areas of Leon County including Tallahassee. Their headquarters is located in the Public Safety Complex.

=== Medical care ===
Hospitals in the area include Tallahassee Memorial Healthcare, Capital Regional Medical Center and HealthSouth Rehabilitation Hospital of Tallahassee.

=== Disasters ===
The Leon County Emergency Operations Center is located in the Public Safety Complex. They prepare for and coordinate response to disasters.

=== Public health ===
The Florida Department of Health operates the county health department in Tallahassee and in all Florida counties.

=== Social services ===
The Florida Department of Children and Families provides social services in Tallahassee and in all Florida counties.

=== Water, sewer and stormwater ===
The City of Tallahassee Utilities department is responsible for water delivery, wastewater treatment, and stormwater management within the city limits.

== Places of interest ==
- Alfred B. Maclay Gardens State Park
- Carnegie Library at FAMU
- Challenger Learning Center
- Co-Cathedral of St. Thomas More
- Doak Campbell Stadium
- Elinor Klapp-Phipps Park
- First Presbyterian Church
- Florida Governor's Mansion
- Florida State Capitol
- Florida Supreme Court
- Foster Tanner Fine Arts Gallery at Florida A&M University
- Frenchtown
- Goodwood Museum and Gardens
- Innovation Park
- Riley Museum of African American History & Culture
- Knott House Museum
- Lake Ella
- Lake Jackson Mounds Archaeological State Park
- LeRoy Collins Leon County Public Library
- Lichgate on High Road
- Mission San Luis de Apalachee
- Museum of Florida History
- National High Magnetic Field Laboratory
- Railroad Square
- Southeastern Regional Black Archives Research Center and Museum
- St. John's Episcopal Church
- Tallahassee Automobile Museum
- Tallahassee Museum
- James D. Westcott Building and Ruby Diamond Auditorium at Florida State University

== Transportation ==
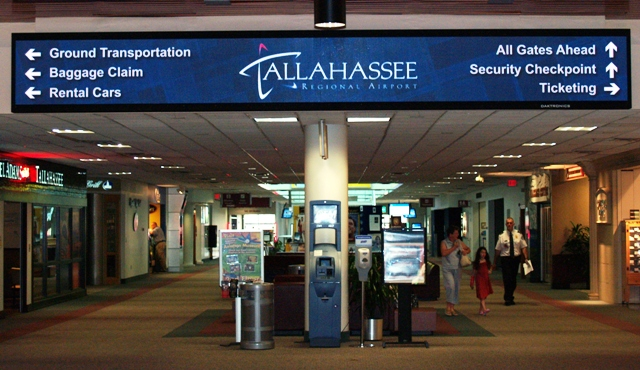
Tallahassee International Airport, seen here as Tallahassee Regional Airport

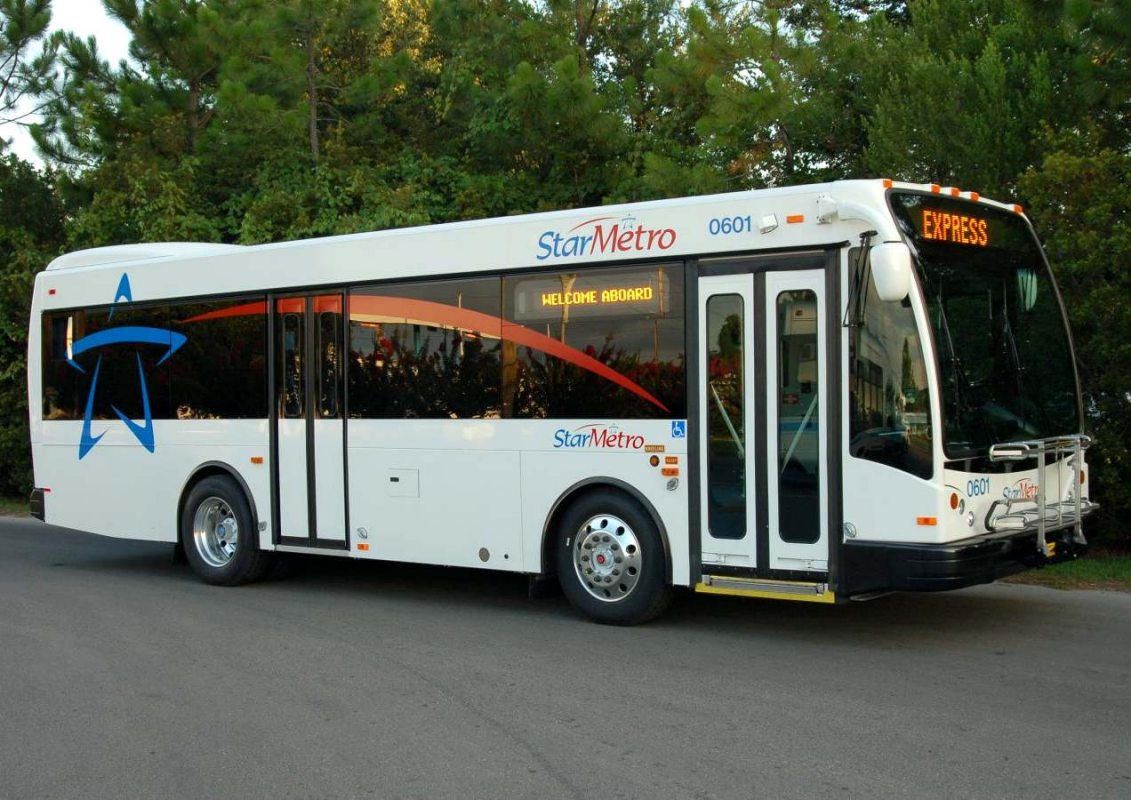
A StarMetro vehicle

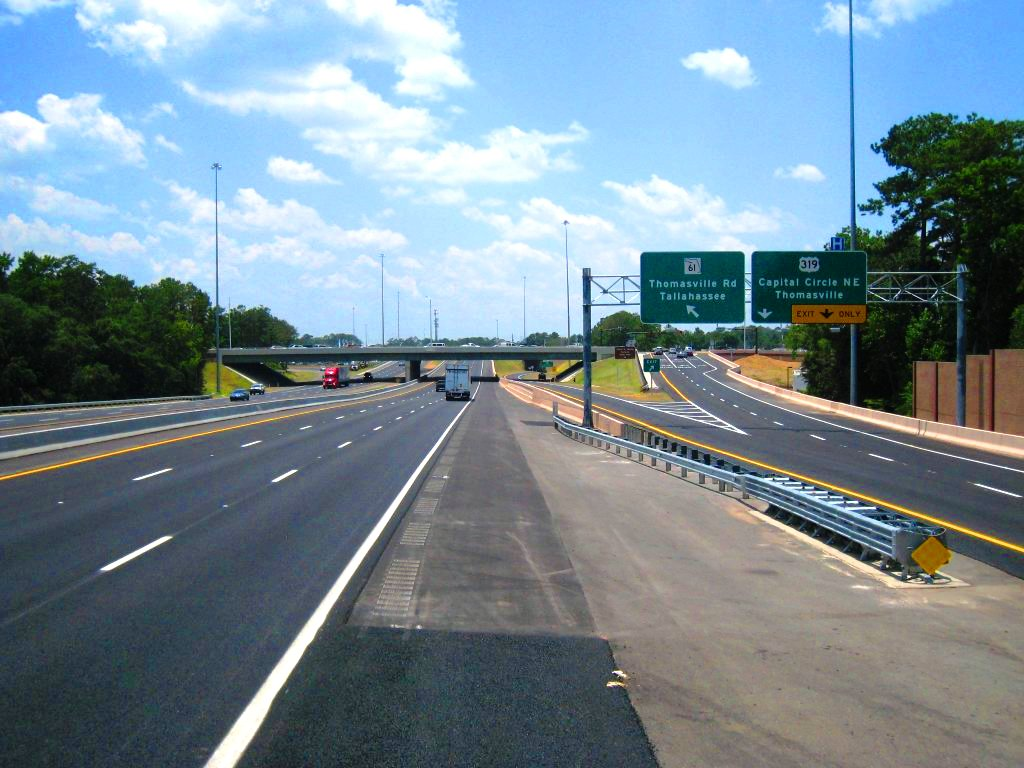
Interstate 10 at Capital Circle Northeast

=== Aviation ===
- Tallahassee International Airport (KTLH)

==== Defunct airports ====
- Dale Mabry Field (closed 1961)
- Tallahassee Commercial Airport (closed 2011)

=== Mass transit ===
- StarMetro provides bus service throughout the city.

=== Intercity bus ===
- Greyhound, Megabus and RedCoach based in downtown Tallahassee.

=== Railroads ===
- Freight service is provided by the Florida Gulf & Atlantic Railroad, which acquired most of the CSX main line from Pensacola to Jacksonville on June 1, 2019. FG&A also purchased the CSX branch from Tallahassee to Attapulgus, Georgia, connecting with the CSX Montgomery-Savannah main line at Bainbridge, Georgia. FG&A's headquarters office is in Tallahassee.

==== Defunct railroads and passenger trains ====
- Tallahassee Railroad, completed in 1837, now the state-owned Tallahassee-St. Marks Historic Railroad State Trail from Tallahassee southward to St. Marks, about 20 miles (32 km).
- Carrabelle, Tallahassee and Georgia Railroad, founded in 1891, merged into the Georgia Florida and Alabama Railway in 1906. The Tallahassee-Carrabelle segment was abandoned in 1948. In 2009, a 2.4-mile (3.9 km) segment of the abandoned railroad was opened as the Tallahassee-Georgia Florida and Alabama (GF&A) Trail in the Apalachicola National Forest.
- The streamlined Gulf Wind coach and Pullman passenger train, operated jointly by the L&N and Seaboard railroads, served Tallahassee from 1949 to 1971, when the newly formed Amtrak cancelled the train.
- Amtrak's Sunset Limited served Tallahassee from April 1993 until service east of New Orleans was suspended in August 2005, following Hurricane Katrina, which caused extensive damage to CSX lines from Louisiana to Florida. The service has never been reinstated, and as of mid-2019 had a "next to zero chance" of being revived by Amtrak. In 2021, Amtrak announced plans restore service as early as 2022 along part of the route from New Orleans to Alabama, but not into Florida. The Tallahassee and Pensacola metropolitan areas are the largest in the state without passenger rail service.

=== Major highways ===
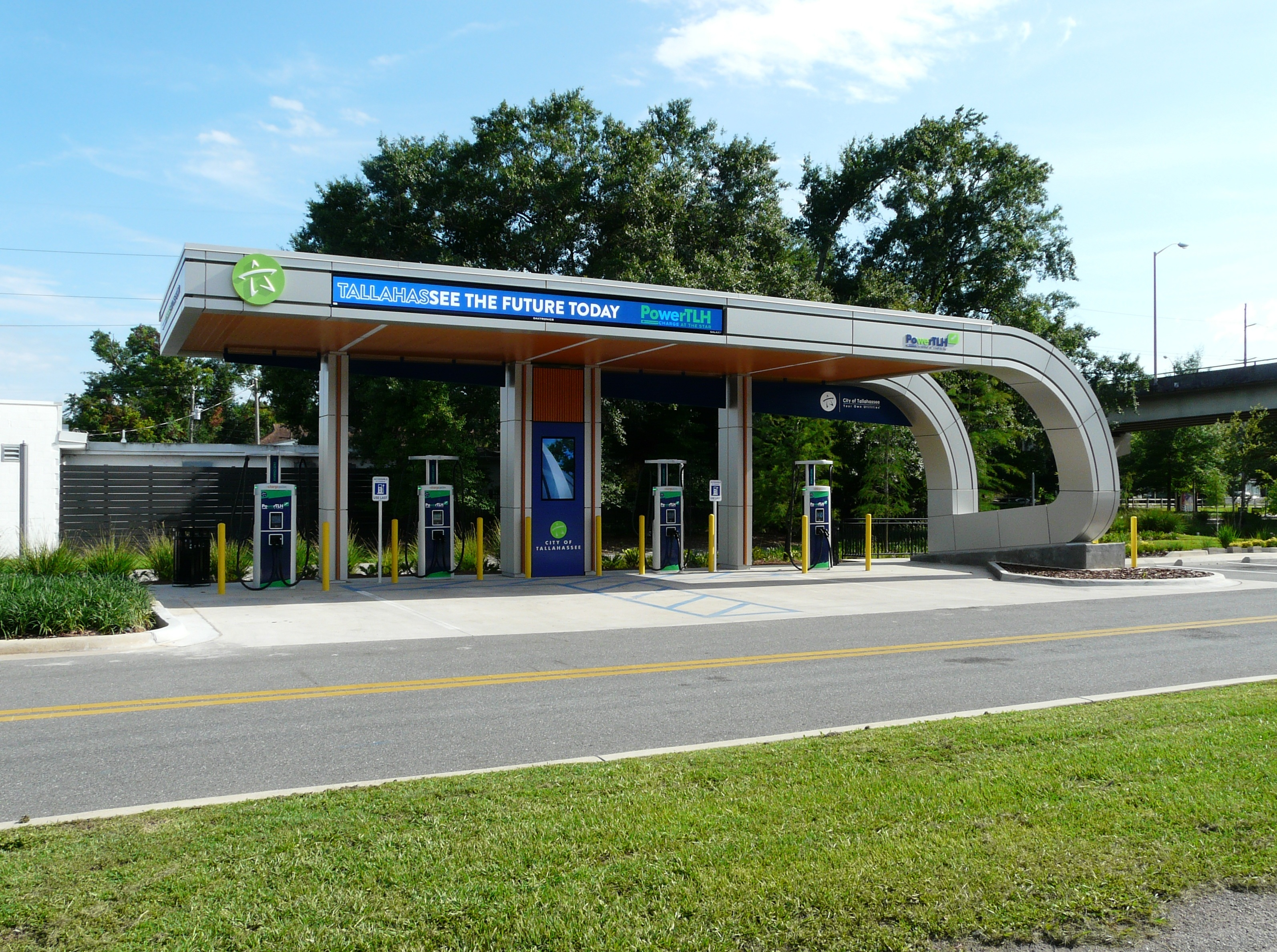
EV charging station downtown

- Interstate 10 runs east–west across the north side of the city. Tallahassee is served by five exits including: Exit 192 (U.S. 90), Exit 196 (Capital Circle NW), Exit 199 (U.S. 27/Monroe St.), Exit 203 (U.S. 319/Thomasville Road and Capital Circle NE), and Exit 209 (U.S. 90/Mahan Dr.)
- U.S. Route 27 enters the city from the northwest before turning south and entering downtown. This portion of U.S. 27 is known locally as Monroe Street. In front of the historic state capitol building, U.S. 27 turns east and follows Apalachee Parkway out of the city.
- U.S. Route 90 runs east–west through Tallahassee. It is known locally as Tennessee Street west of Magnolia Drive and Mahan Drive east of Magnolia.
- U.S. Route 319 runs north–south along the east side of the city using Thomasville Road, Capital Circle NE, Capital Circle SE, and Crawfordville Road.
- State Road 20
- State Road 61
- State Road 363
- Orchard Pond Parkway, the first privately built toll road in Florida.

== Namesakes ==
- CSS Tallahassee, 1864 Confederate cruiser
- USS Tallahassee (BM-9), 1908 US Navy monitor, originally named USS Florida
- USS Tallahassee (CL-61), 1941 US Navy light cruiser, converted to the aircraft carrier USS Princeton
- USS Tallahassee (CL-116), 1944 US Navy light cruiser
- Tallahassee, main character in the movie Zombieland
- Tallahassee, album recorded by The Mountain Goats
- Tallahassee Tight, early-20th-century blues singer
- T-Pain, musician, originally "Tallahassee Pain"
- "Tallahassee Lassie", Freddy Cannon song
- "Tallahassee", Bing Crosby & Andrews Sisters song

== Sister cities ==
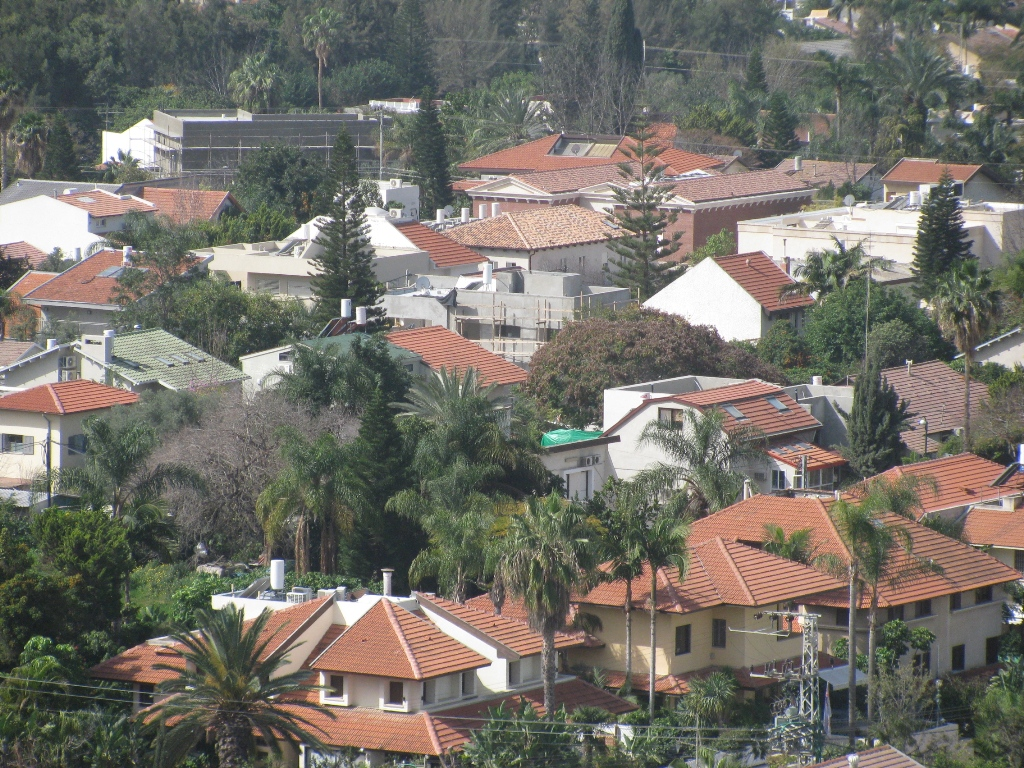
Ramat HaSharon, Israel

Tallahassee has 5 sister cities as follows:

- Konongo-Odumase, Ashanti, Ghana
- St. Maarten, Netherlands Antilles
- Sligo, County Sligo, Ireland
- Rugao, Jiangsu, China
- Ramat HaSharon, Tel Aviv District, Israel

== Tallahassee groups and organizations ==
- Cold Water Army, music group
- Creed, rock band
- Cream Abdul Babar, music group
- The Crüxshadows, music group
- David Canter, medical doctor, folk musician
- Dead Prez, Alternative hip hop duo
- Go Radio, music group
- Her New Knife, music group
- FAMU Marching 100, marching band
- FSU Marching Chiefs, marching band
- Look Mexico, rock band
- Mayday Parade, music group
- Mira, music group
- No Address, music group
- Socialburn, rock band
- Tallahassee Symphony Orchestra, symphony orchestra
- Woman's Club of Tallahassee

== State associations based in Tallahassee ==
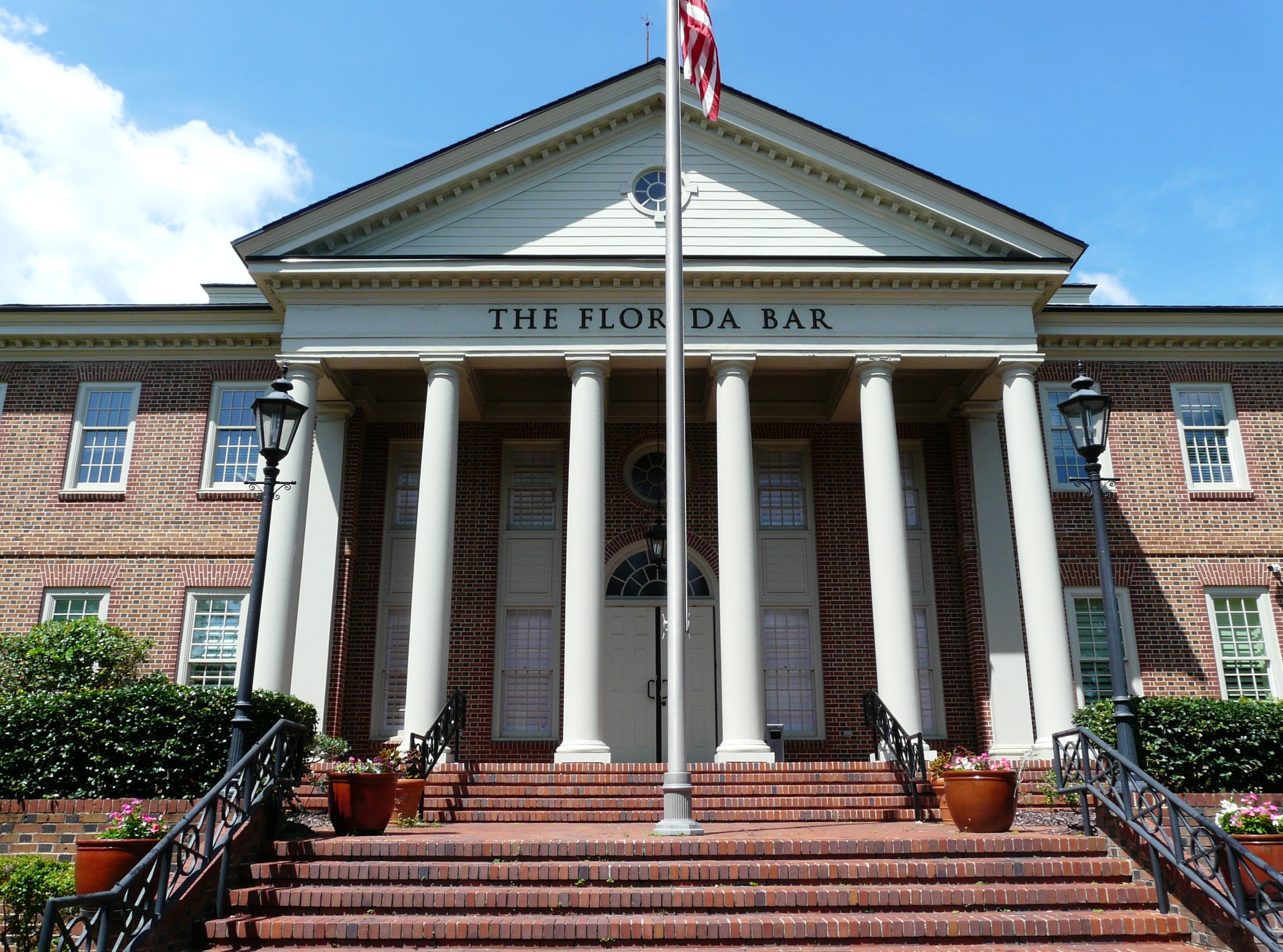
The Florida Bar on Jefferson Street

- The Florida Bar
- Florida Chamber of Commerce
- Florida Dental Association
- Florida Institute of CPAs
- Florida Lottery
- Independent Colleges and Universities of Florida

== See also ==
- Consolidation of Leon County with Tallahassee
- History of Tallahassee, Florida
- Tallahassee meridian
- Park Avenue Historic District
- Tallahassee Historic District Zones I And II
- USS Tallahassee, 3 ships
