= National Register of Historic Places listings in Leon County, Florida =

Location of Leon County in Florida

This is a list of the National Register of Historic Places listings in Leon County, Florida.

This is intended to be a complete list of the properties and districts on the National Register of Historic Places in Leon County, Florida, United States. The locations of National Register properties and districts for which the latitude and longitude coordinates are included below, may be seen in a map.

There are 71 properties and districts listed on the National Register in the county, including 1 National Historic Landmark. Another 3 properties were once listed, but have since been delisted.

This National Park Service list is complete through NPS recent listings posted August 7, 2026.

Contents: Counties in Florida (non-linked contain no National Register listings)
Alachua - Baker - Bay - Bradford - Brevard - Broward - Calhoun - Charlotte - Citrus - Clay - Collier - Columbia - DeSoto - Dixie - Duval - Escambia - Flagler - Franklin - Gadsden - Gilchrist - Glades - Gulf - Hamilton - Hardee - Hendry - Hernando - Highlands - Hillsborough (Tampa) - Holmes - Indian River - Jackson - Jefferson - Lafayette - Lake - Lee - Leon - Levy - Liberty - Madison - Manatee - Marion - Martin - Miami-Dade (Miami) - Monroe - Nassau - Okaloosa - Okeechobee - Orange - Osceola - Palm Beach - Pasco - Pinellas - Polk - Putnam - St. Johns - St. Lucie - Santa Rosa - Sarasota - Seminole - Sumter - Suwannee - Taylor - Union - Volusia - Wakulla - Walton - Washington

== Current listings ==
| | Name on the Register | Image | Date listed | Location | City or town | Description |
|---|---|---|---|---|---|---|
| 1 | Averitt-Winchester House | Averitt-Winchester House | November 15, 1996 (#96001336) | Western side of State Road 59, south of its junction with Moccasin Gap-Cromartie Road; 30°35′33″N 84°02′31″W | Miccosukee | |
| 2 | Bannerman Plantation | Bannerman Plantation | June 6, 2002 (#02000606) | 13426 Meridian Road North; 30°38′42″N 84°16′44″W | Tallahassee | Part of the Rural Resources of Leon County MPS |
| 3 | Bellevue | Bellevue | March 11, 1971 (#71000238) | Southwest of Tallahassee off State Road 371; 30°24′45″N 84°20′41″W | Tallahassee | |
| 4 | Billingsley Farm | Billingsley Farm | September 5, 2007 (#07000897) | 3640 Oakhurst Lane; 30°31′00″N 84°04′29″W | Tallahassee | |
| 5 | Blackwood-Harwood Plantations Cemetery | Blackwood-Harwood Plantations Cemetery | October 6, 1999 (#99000712) | Northeast of the junction of State Road 263 and Interstate 10; 30°29′13″N 84°21′01″W | Tallahassee | |
| 6 | Bradley's Country Store | Bradley's Country Store | April 12, 1984 (#84000902) | Moccasin Gap Road; 30°35′27″N 84°07′31″W | Tallahassee | |
| 7 | Camp House | Camp House | July 22, 2020 (#100005383) | 2307 Ellicott Dr. 30°28′21″N 84°15′15″W | Tallahassee | |
| 8 | Caroline Brevard Grammar School | Caroline Brevard Grammar School | December 17, 1987 (#87002151) | 727 South Calhoun Street; 30°26′09″N 84°16′45″W | Tallahassee | |
| 9 | Brokaw-McDougall House | Brokaw-McDougall House | July 24, 1972 (#72000333) | 329 North Meridian Road; 30°26′44″N 84°16′35″W | Tallahassee | |
| 10 | Calhoun Street Historic District | Calhoun Street Historic District | October 24, 1979 (#79000677) | U.S. Route 90 and State Road 61; 30°26′47″N 84°16′44″W | Tallahassee | |
| 11 | Carnegie Library | Carnegie Library | November 17, 1978 (#78000949) | Florida Agricultural and Mechanical University campus 30°25′39″N 84°17′11″W | Tallahassee | |
| 12 | Cascades Park | Cascades Park | May 12, 1971 (#71000239) | Bounded roughly by the Apalachee Parkway, Bloxham, Suwanee, Munroe, and Meridian Streets, and state property line 30°26′08″N 84°16′38″W | Tallahassee | |
| 13 | Chaires Community Historic District | Chaires Community Historic District | December 13, 2000 (#00001502) | Roughly along Chaires Cross Road, Road to the Lake, and Hancock Street; 30°26′12″N 84°07′09″W | Chaires | |
| 14 | Flavius C. Coles Farmhouse | Flavius C. Coles Farmhouse | January 7, 1992 (#91001911) | 411 Oakland Avenue; 30°25′52″N 84°16′41″W | Tallahassee | |
| 15 | The Columns | The Columns | May 21, 1975 (#75000561) | 100 North Duval Street; 30°26′32″N 84°17′00″W | Tallahassee | |
| 16 | Covington House | Covington House | September 7, 1989 (#89001386) | 328 Cortez Street; 30°27′42″N 84°16′30″W | Tallahassee | |
| 17 | Escambe | Escambe | May 14, 1971 (#71000240) | Address Restricted | Tallahassee | |
| 18 | Exchange Bank Building | Exchange Bank Building | November 29, 1984 (#84000262) | 201 South Monroe Street; 30°26′25″N 84°16′50″W | Tallahassee | |
| 19 | Fire Station No. 2 | Fire Station No. 2 | February 14, 2017 (#100000642) | 224 E. 6th St. 30°27′23″N 84°16′48″W | Tallahassee | |
| 20 | First Presbyterian Church | First Presbyterian Church | September 9, 1974 (#74000649) | 102 North Adams Street; 30°26′32″N 84°16′57″W | Tallahassee | |
| 21 | Florida Agricultural and Mechanical College Historic District | Florida Agricultural and Mechanical College Historic District | May 9, 1996 (#96000530) | Roughly along Martin Luther King Boulevard; 30°25′37″N 84°17′07″W | Tallahassee | |
| 22 | Florida Governor's Mansion | Florida Governor's Mansion | July 20, 2006 (#06000618) | 700 North Adams Street; 30°26′59″N 84°16′57″W | Tallahassee | |
| 23 | Florida State Capitol | Florida State Capitol | May 7, 1973 (#73000584) | South Monroe Street; 30°26′16″N 84°16′53″W | Tallahassee | |
| 24 | Jake Gaither Golf Course | Jake Gaither Golf Course | August 9, 2022 (#100007971) | 801 Bragg Drive; 30°24′16″N 84°17′52″W | Tallahassee | |
| 25 | Gaither House | Gaither House | May 18, 2016 (#16000268) | 212 Young St. 30°25′22″N 84°17′01″W | Tallahassee | |
| 26 | Gallie's Hall and Buildings | Gallie's Hall and Buildings | October 20, 1980 (#80000954) | Off State Road 61; 30°26′23″N 84°16′55″W | Tallahassee | |
| 27 | Goodwood | Goodwood | June 30, 1972 (#72000334) | 1500 Miccosukee Road; 30°27′29″N 84°15′28″W | Tallahassee | |
| 28 | Greene-Lewis House | Greene-Lewis House | June 11, 1998 (#98000677) | 535 West College Avenue; 30°26′N 84°17′W | Tallahassee | |
| 29 | Greenwood Cemetery | Greenwood Cemetery | June 5, 2003 (#03000510) | Old Bainbridge Road; 30°27′37″N 84°17′43″W | Tallahassee | |
| 30 | The Grove | The Grove | June 13, 1972 (#72000335) | Adams Street and 1st Avenue; 30°27′01″N 84°16′55″W | Tallahassee | Boundary increase approved April 25, 2019 |
| 31 | Jacksonville, Pensacola and Mobile Railroad Company Freight Depot | Jacksonville, Pensacola and Mobile Railroad Company Freight Depot | December 30, 1997 (#97001589) | 918 Railroad Avenue; 30°25′59″N 84°17′26″W | Tallahassee | |
| 32 | Killearn Plantation Archeological and Historic District | Killearn Plantation Archeological and Historic District | August 16, 2002 (#02000836) | 3540 Thomasville Road; 30°31′08″N 84°15′04″W | Tallahassee | |
| 33 | Lake Jackson Mounds | Lake Jackson Mounds | May 6, 1971 (#71000241) | Address Restricted; 30°30′00″N 84°18′49″W | Tallahassee | |
| 34 | Leon County Health Unit Building | Leon County Health Unit Building | January 29, 2018 (#100002023) | 325 E Gaines St. 30°26′08″N 84°16′43″W | Tallahassee | |
| 35 | Leon High School | Leon High School | September 21, 1993 (#93000982) | 550 East Tennessee Street; 30°26′41″N 84°16′29″W | Tallahassee | |
| 36 | Lewis House | Lewis House | February 14, 1979 (#79000679) | North of Tallahassee at 3117 Okeeheepkee Road; 30°29′24″N 84°18′46″W | Tallahassee | |
| 37 | Lichgate on High Road | Lichgate on High Road | March 31, 2006 (#06000211) | 1401 High Road; 30°27′39″N 84°18′49″W | Tallahassee | |
| 38 | Los Robles Gate | Los Robles Gate | September 21, 1989 (#89001480) | Thomasville and Meridian Roads; 30°27′30″N 84°16′37″W | Tallahassee | |
| 39 | Los Robles Historic District | Los Robles Historic District | November 12, 2014 (#14000902) | Roughly bounded by Thomasville Rd., North Meridian Rd. and the rear lot lines of properties facing Desoto St. 30°27′41″N 84°16′33″W | Tallahassee | |
| 40 | Magnolia Heights Historic District | Magnolia Heights Historic District | June 29, 1984 (#84000906) | 701-1005 East Park Avenue and Cadiz Street; 30°26′30″N 84°16′06″W | Tallahassee | |
| 41 | Gov. John W. Martin House | Gov. John W. Martin House | January 6, 1986 (#86000024) | 1001 Governor's Drive; 30°26′06″N 84°15′50″W | Tallahassee | |
| 42 | Meridian Road | Meridian Road | March 20, 2013 (#13000081) | Roughly John Hancock Dr. to Georgia State Line; 30°36′13″N 84°17′49″W | Tallahassee | |
| 43 | Miccosukee Methodist Church | Miccosukee Methodist Church | June 28, 1996 (#96000695) | County Road 59, south of junction with State Road 151; 30°35′36″N 84°02′28″W | Miccosukee | |
| 44 | Natural Bridge Battlefield | Natural Bridge Battlefield | September 29, 1970 (#70000188) | East of Woodville off U.S. Route 319; 30°17′02″N 84°09′07″W | Woodville | |
| 45 | Old City Waterworks | Old City Waterworks | January 31, 1979 (#79000680) | East Gaines and South Gadsden Streets; 30°26′08″N 84°16′41″W | Tallahassee | |
| 46 | Old Fort Braden School | Old Fort Braden School | April 14, 1994 (#94000347) | Jackson Bluff Road, 18 miles west of Tallahassee; 30°25′32″N 84°32′05″W | Tallahassee | |
| 47 | Park Avenue Historic District | Park Avenue Historic District | October 24, 1979 (#79000681) | Park Avenue and Call Street; 30°26′34″N 84°16′55″W | Tallahassee | |
| 48 | Pisgah United Methodist Church | Pisgah United Methodist Church | May 3, 1974 (#74000650) | North of Tallahassee, southeast of State Road 151; 30°33′05″N 84°09′49″W | Tallahassee | |
| 49 | John Gilmore Riley House | John Gilmore Riley House | August 1, 1978 (#78000950) | 419 East Jefferson Street; 30°26′21″N 84°16′39″W | Tallahassee | |
| 50 | Roberts Farm Historic and Archeological District | Roberts Farm Historic and Archeological District | November 2, 1995 (#95001186) | Roberts Road, 1 mile east of Centerville Road; 30°32′00″N 84°09′27″W | Tallahassee | Part of the Rural Resources of Leon County MPS |
| 51 | Rollins House | Rollins House | December 31, 2001 (#01001415) | 5456 Rollins Pointe; 30°32′35″N 84°19′41″W | Tallahassee | |
| 52 | Ruge Hall | Ruge Hall | August 1, 1997 (#97000838) | 655 West Jefferson Street; 30°26′21″N 84°17′35″W | Tallahassee | |
| 53 | St. John's Episcopal Church | St. John's Episcopal Church | August 10, 1978 (#78000951) | 211 North Monroe Street; 30°26′37″N 84°16′49″W | Tallahassee | |
| 54 | San Luis de Apalache | San Luis de Apalache | October 15, 1966 (#66000266) | 2 miles west of Tallahassee; 30°27′04″N 84°19′11″W | Tallahassee | |
| 55 | San Pedro y San Pablo de Patale | San Pedro y San Pablo de Patale | June 26, 1972 (#72000336) | 6 miles east of Tallahassee; 30°28′04″N 84°09′00″W | Tallahassee | |
| 56 | Smoky Hollow Historic District | Smoky Hollow Historic District | October 27, 2000 (#00001199) | Roughly bounded by East Lafayette Street, the CSX railroad tracks, Myers Park, and Myers Park Lane; 30°26′11″N 84°16′19″W | Tallahassee | |
| 57 | Sollner-Wall House | Sollner-Wall House | October 9, 2012 (#12000839) | 1759 Chaires Cross Road; 30°28′27″N 84°07′33″W | Tallahassee | |
| 58 | Strickland-Herold House | Strickland-Herold House | January 9, 1997 (#96001523) | Main Street, northwest of the junction of Moccasin Gap Road and State Road 59; 30°35′39″N 84°02′48″W | Miccosukee | |
| 59 | Strickland School | | November 12, 2014 (#14000903) | 14735 Beth Page Rd. 30°40′06″N 84°10′52″W | Tallahassee | |
| 60 | Tall Timbers Plantation | Tall Timbers Plantation | April 7, 1989 (#89000240) | County Road 12, 3 miles west of U.S. Route 319; 30°39′23″N 84°12′32″W | Tallahassee | |
| 61 | Tallahassee Historic District Zones I And II | Tallahassee Historic District Zones I And II | October 26, 1972 (#72000337) | Calhoun Street between Georgia and Tennessee Streets and East Park Avenue between Gadsden and Calhoun Streets; 30°26′46″N 84°16′46″W | Tallahassee | |
| 62 | Taylor House | Taylor House | April 6, 2015 (#15000127) | 442 W. Georgia St. 30°26′53″N 84°17′15″W | Tallahassee | |
| 63 | Tookes House | Tookes House | January 26, 2001 (#01000004) | 412 West Virginia Avenue; 30°26′44″N 84°17′11″W | Tallahassee | |
| 64 | Union Bank | Union Bank | February 24, 1971 (#71000242) | Apalachee Parkway and Calhoun Street; 30°26′15″N 84°16′48″W | Tallahassee | |
| 65 | Van Brunt House | Van Brunt House | February 27, 1997 (#97000162) | State Road 59, north of its junction with Moccasin Gap Road; 30°35′47″N 84°02′29″W | Miccosukee | |
| 66 | Wahnish Cigar Factory and Tobacco Warehouse | Wahnish Cigar Factory and Tobacco Warehouse | August 1, 2018 (#100002725) | 469 St. Francis Street; 30°26′04″N 84°17′18″W | Tallahassee | |
| 67 | David S. Walker Library | David S. Walker Library | June 22, 1976 (#76000600) | 209 East Park Avenue; 30°26′29″N 84°16′49″W | Tallahassee | |
| 68 | Williams House | Williams House | April 4, 1996 (#96000360) | 450 Saint Francis Street; 30°26′04″N 84°17′17″W | Tallahassee | |
| 69 | Winterle House | Winterle House | February 17, 1998 (#98000082) | 1111 Paul Russell Road; 30°24′17″N 84°15′57″W | Tallahassee | |
| 70 | Woman's Club of Tallahassee | Woman's Club of Tallahassee | November 18, 1987 (#87002046) | 1513 Cristobal Drive; 30°27′38″N 84°16′32″W | Tallahassee | |
| 71 | Woman's Working Band House | Woman's Working Band House | October 20, 2010 (#10000848) | 648 W. Brevard St. 30°26′57″N 84°17′34″W | Tallahassee | |

== Former listings ==
| | Name on the Register | Image | Date listed | Date removed | Location | City or town | Description |
|---|---|---|---|---|---|---|---|
| 1 | Hotel Floridan | Hotel Floridan | July 20, 1979 (#84000272) | June 2, 1982 | 204 N. Monroe St. | Tallahassee | Demolished in 1985. |
| 2 | Johnson-Caldwell House | Johnson-Caldwell House | July 20, 1979 (#79000678) | June 12, 1989 | Old Bainbridge Rd. | Tallahassee | Moved to FSU campus in 1986 |
| 3 | Works Progress Administration Building | Works Progress Administration Building | January 29, 2018 (#100002025) | July 24, 2018 | 319 East Gaines Street; 30°26′08″N 84°16′44″W | Tallahassee | Demolished two months after listing for Cascades development project |

== See also ==
- List of National Historic Landmarks in Florida
- National Register of Historic Places listings in Florida
