= Wall House =

Wall House may refer to:
(sorted by state, then city/town)

- Sollner-Wall House, Tallahassee, Florida, listed on the National Register of Historic Places (NRHP) in Leon County
- Wall-Ratzlaff House, Buhler, Kansas, listed on the NRHP in Reno County
- Judge T. B. Wall House, Wichita, Kansas, listed on the NRHP in Sedgwick County
- Wall House (Clinton, Louisiana), listed on the NRHP in East Feliciana Parish
- Comins-Wall House, Southbridge, Massachusetts, NRHP-listed
- Wall-Seppanen House, Iron River, Michigan, NRHP-listed
- Carlton D. Wall House, Plymouth, Michigan, NRHP-listed
- Taylor-Wall-Yancy House, Sardis, Mississippi, listed on the NRHP in Panola County
- George Wall House, Durham, North Carolina
- George W. Wall House, Wallburg, North Carolina, listed on the NRHP in Davidson County
- Wall House (Elkins Park, Pennsylvania), NRHP-listed
- B.C. Wall House, North Augusta, South Carolina, NRHP-listed
- Adam Wall House, Prices Fork, Virginia, NRHP-listed
- Thomas R. Wall Residence, Oshkosh, Wisconsin, listed on the NRHP in Winnebago County
