= Billingsley =

Billingsley may refer to:

== People ==
- Billingsley (surname)

== Places ==
- Billingsley, Alabama, a town in the United States
- Billingsley, Band, rock band of brothers, from Western North Carolina
- Billingsley, Shropshire, a village in England
- Billingsley Farm, a historic place in Wadesboro, Florida, United States
- Billingsley Road, in Charles County, Maryland, United States

== Other ==
- USS Billingsley (DD-293), a destroyer in the United States Navy following World War I
