= Billingsley (surname) =

Billingsley is a surname. Notable people with the surname include:

- Andrew Billingsley (born 1926), American sociologist and university president
- Barbara Billingsley (1915–2010), American actress
- Brent Billingsley (born 1975), American baseball pitcher
- Chad Billingsley (born 1984), American baseball pitcher
- Charles Billingsley (cricketer) (1910–1951), Irish cricketer
- Franny Billingsley (born 1954), American children's fantasy novelist
- Frederic C. Billingsley (1921–2002), American engineer
- Henry Billingsley (died 1606), Lord Mayor of London and the first translator of Euclid into English
- Hobie Billingsley (1926–2022), American diver
- Jace Billingsley (born 1993), American football player
- Jahleel Billingsley (born 2001), American football player
- Jennifer Billingsley (born 1940), American actress
- JoJo Billingsley (1952–2010), American singer and songwriter
- John Billingsley (born 1960), American actor
- John Billingsley (agriculturist) (1747–1811), British agriculturist
- Patrick Billingsley, (1925–2011), American mathematician and actor
- Peter Billingsley (born 1971), American actor, director, and producer
- Ray Billingsley (born 1957), American cartoonist, creator of Curtis
- Ron Billingsley (1945–2017), American football player
- Sherman Billingsley (1900–1966), American nightclub owner and bootlegger
- William Billingsley (aviator) (1887–1913), American aviator
- William Billingsley (artist) (1758–1828), English porcelain painter
