= Charles Billingsley =

Charles Billingsley may refer to:

- Charles Billingsley (cricketer) (1910–1951), Irish cricketer
- Charles Billingsley (musician) (born 1970), Christian singer and worship leader
