= Abraham Crosby =

19th-century American state legislator

Abraham Crosby was an American state legislator in Florida. He served in the Florida Senate representing Bradford County, Florida. His post office was in Zif. Martha Crosby served as a postmaster there.

He served during the American Civil War. He served four terms in the Florida Senate. A Democrat, he served in the Florida Senate in 1889, 1891, 1897, and 1899.

The Florida Archives have a portrait of him. He was also photographed with other state senators on the capitol steps by Alvan S. Harper.
