= Isaac Jenkins =

American politician

Isaac Jenkins (1846–1911) was an American politician who served in the Florida House of Representatives in the 1880s.

Jenkins was born on August 10, 1846, in Leon County, Florida. An African American born into slavery, Leon lived on the farm of his owner, General Robert Butler, until the American Civil War broke out in 1861. He served as a cook in the Confederate Army until the Emancipation Proclamation was issued in 1863.

After being freed, he moved to Tallahassee. He worked as a tinner for two years, then as a store clerk. He married Mary Adkerson in 1860, and worked as a painter, clerk, and sexton of the city cemetery.

Jenkins served as a Tallahassee councilman in 1876. He was elected to the Florida House of Representatives in 1880 and again in 1882, to serve in the 1881 and 1883 sessions representing Leon County. Charles Rollins and Wallace S. Weeks were his fellow Representatives from Leon County.

Jenkins was a Baptist. He died on November 30, 1911, in Leon County, Florida.
