= Greenwood Cemetery (Tallahassee, Florida) =

Historic African-American cemetery in Leon County, Florida

- U.S. National Register of Historic Places
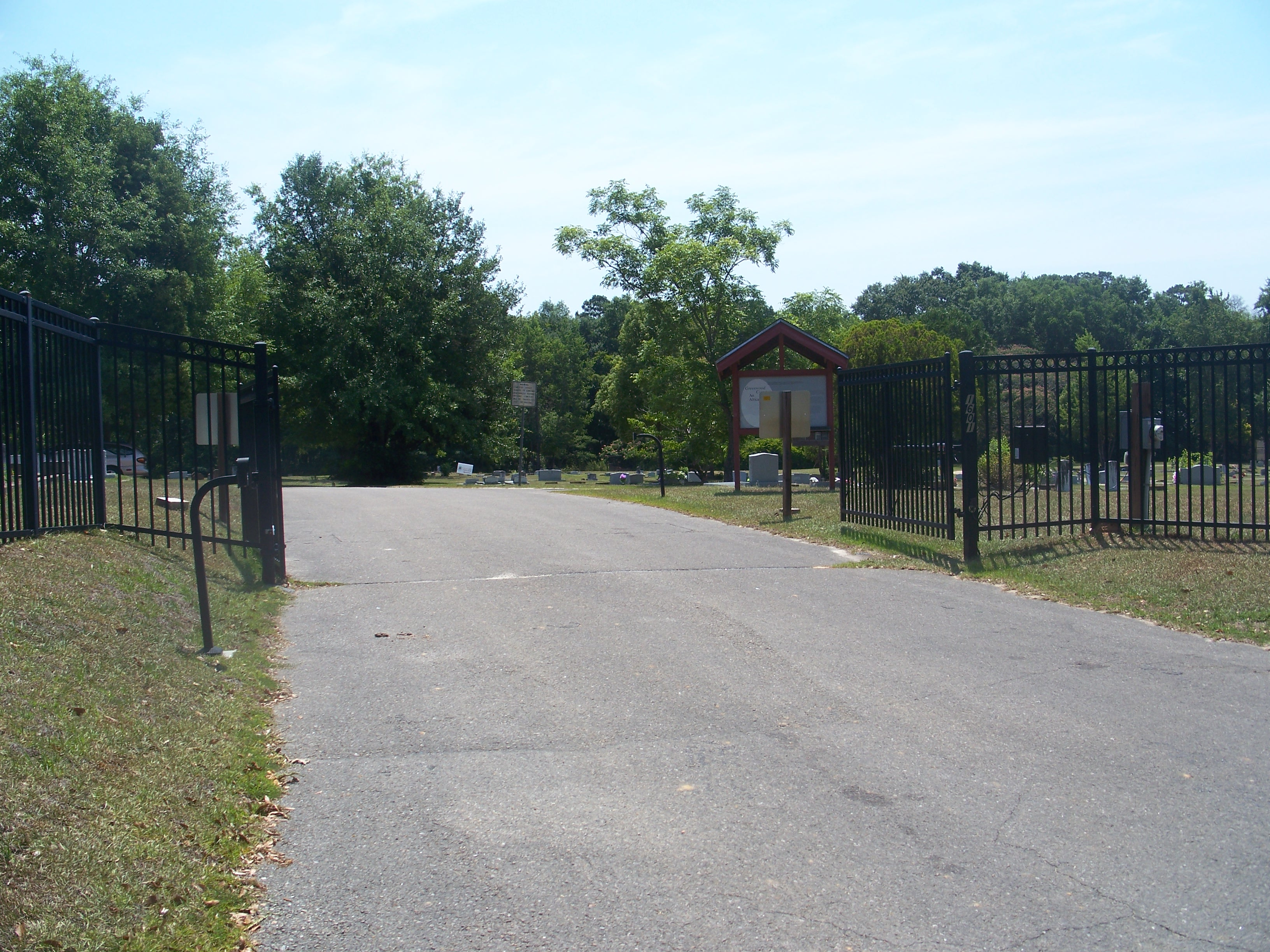

- Location within Florida Location within the United States
- Location: Tallahassee, Florida, US
- Coordinates: 30°27′37″N 84°17′43″W
- NRHP reference No.: 03000510
- Added to NRHP: June 6, 2003

The Greenwood Cemetery (est. 1937) is a historic African American cemetery in Tallahassee, Florida, United States. It is located in Leon County on Old Bainbridge Road, which was originally the main route out of Tallahassee to the northwest. Greenwood was created after city cemeteries were closed to African American burials, making it one of the first cemeteries in the city founded solely for the African American community. The cemetery reflects the history of segregation, as well as the resilience of the local leaders who founded it. In 2003, Greenwood was added to the U.S. National Register of Historic Places for its cultural and historical significance. The cemetery holds more than 1,000 burials, including notable community leaders and athletes.

== History ==
=== Founding ===
Greenwood Cemetery was founded in 1937, after the City of Tallahassee's closure of the African American sections of its public cemeteries, such as the Oakland and Old City cemeteries. Evergreen Cemetery, the first exclusively African American burial ground, was established prior to the Greenwood Cemetery in 1936. However, it received strong opposition from the African American community, who argued the site was unsuitable. In response, local leaders organized the Greenwood Cemetery Company on March 19, 1937, and purchased ten acres of land on Old Bainbridge Road from Erma Jenkins, one of the founders. African Americans were allowed to join the association if they had "good character" and were over the age of twenty-one. The first burials took place soon afterward, and the streets and pathways were officially platted in 1942. Greenwood later expanded in 1950, 1954, and 1964, bringing the cemetery to over sixteen acres, though about twelve acres represent its historic core.

=== Neglect and decline ===
Since its creation, Greenwood Cemetery has relied on families to care for individual plots. Over time, many descendants either moved away or died, leaving large sections of cemetery overgrown and untended. Across the cemetery, wooden markers deteriorated, graves subsided, and vegetation covered many burial sites. Additionally, record-keeping was inconsistent, so details of ownership were often lost. By the early 1980s, the majority of Greenwood appeared neglected and abandoned, and even though burials continued.

=== National Register of Historic Places ===
In 2003, Greenwood Cemetery was added to the U.S. National Register of Historic Places. The Greenwood Cemetery was recognized for its African American heritage, social history, and folk art. The cemetery's handmade concrete markers and cultural burial traditions are important expressions of community identity.

== Preservation and restoration ==
=== 1985–1987 cleanup efforts ===
Concern over Greenwood's condition led to the formation of the Greenwood Foundation in 1985. The group organized volunteers and raised money for lawn services. Working with the Historic Tallahassee Preservation Board, volunteers were trained in surveying gravestones and other preservation methods. In May 1987, nearly 200 volunteers participated in a large cleanup, clearing vegetation and restoring the appearance of the cemetery. Additional community cleanup events were held that summer, restoring Greenwood Cemetery to a safe and maintained condition.

=== City maintenance ===
In April 1987, the city of Tallahassee agreed to take on responsibility for Greenwood's streets and drainage system, while landscaping would remain the responsibility of local groups. In October of that year, the cemetery was formally rededicated in a ceremony attended by city and county officials, as well as community volunteers.

=== Later recognition ===
After the rededication of the Greenwood Cemetery, the John G. Riley House Museum and Center for African American History supported Greenwood's preservation. In 1997, the museum hosted the tenth anniversary of Greenwood's restoration. The community celebrated the occasion, and in 2003, the cemetery was formally recognized on the National Register of Historic Places.

== Cultural and community significance ==
=== African American folk art and burial traditions ===
Greenwood Cemetery contains more than 1,000 burials marked by a variety of gravestones. Many are commercial markers made of marble or granite, including government-issued tablets for veterans, but a large number are handmade concrete markers created by local craftsmen. Inscriptions were often hand-carved or stamped into wet concrete, and some markers incorporated ceramic tiles, mirrors, or painted surfaces. A variety of shapes were used, such as crosses, "T" forms, triangular, and arrow-topped stones. These designs show African American folk art traditions and symbolic practices, including themes such as water, reflection, and eternal life. Planting different trees, like cedar and crepe myrtle, represents the cultural expressions of remembrance and continuity.

=== Notable burials ===
Several individuals significant to the state and the local community are buried at Greenwood Cemetery. These include Maxwell Courtney, the first African American to graduate from Florida State University; Willie Galimore, a professional football player for the Chicago Bears; James M. Abner, the principle of Lincoln High School; and T.M. McKinnis, owner of the Red Bird Café.
