= Alvan S. Harper =

American photographer (1847–1911)

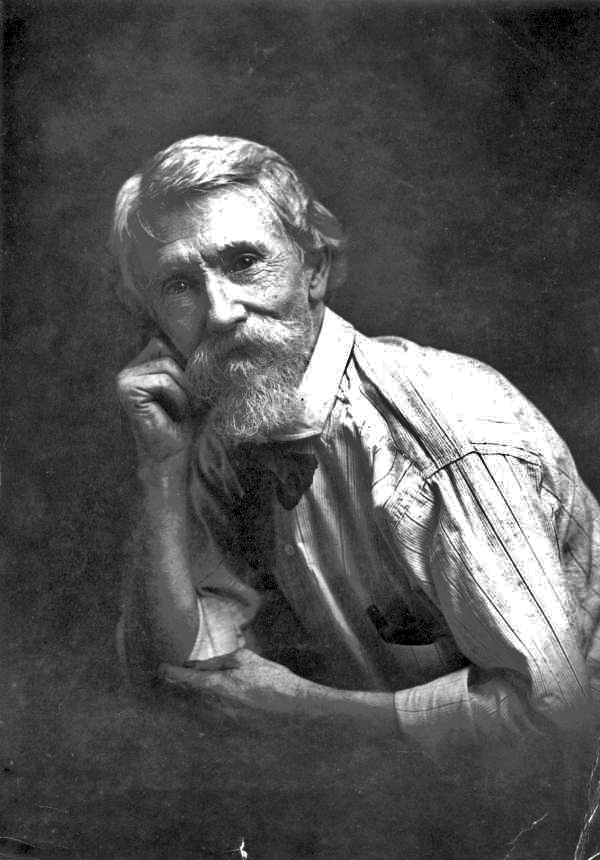
- Born: Norristown, Pennsylvania
- Died: May 19, 1911 (aged 63–64); Tallahassee, Florida
- Other name: A. S. Harper
- Occupation: photographer
- Years active: 1885 - 1910

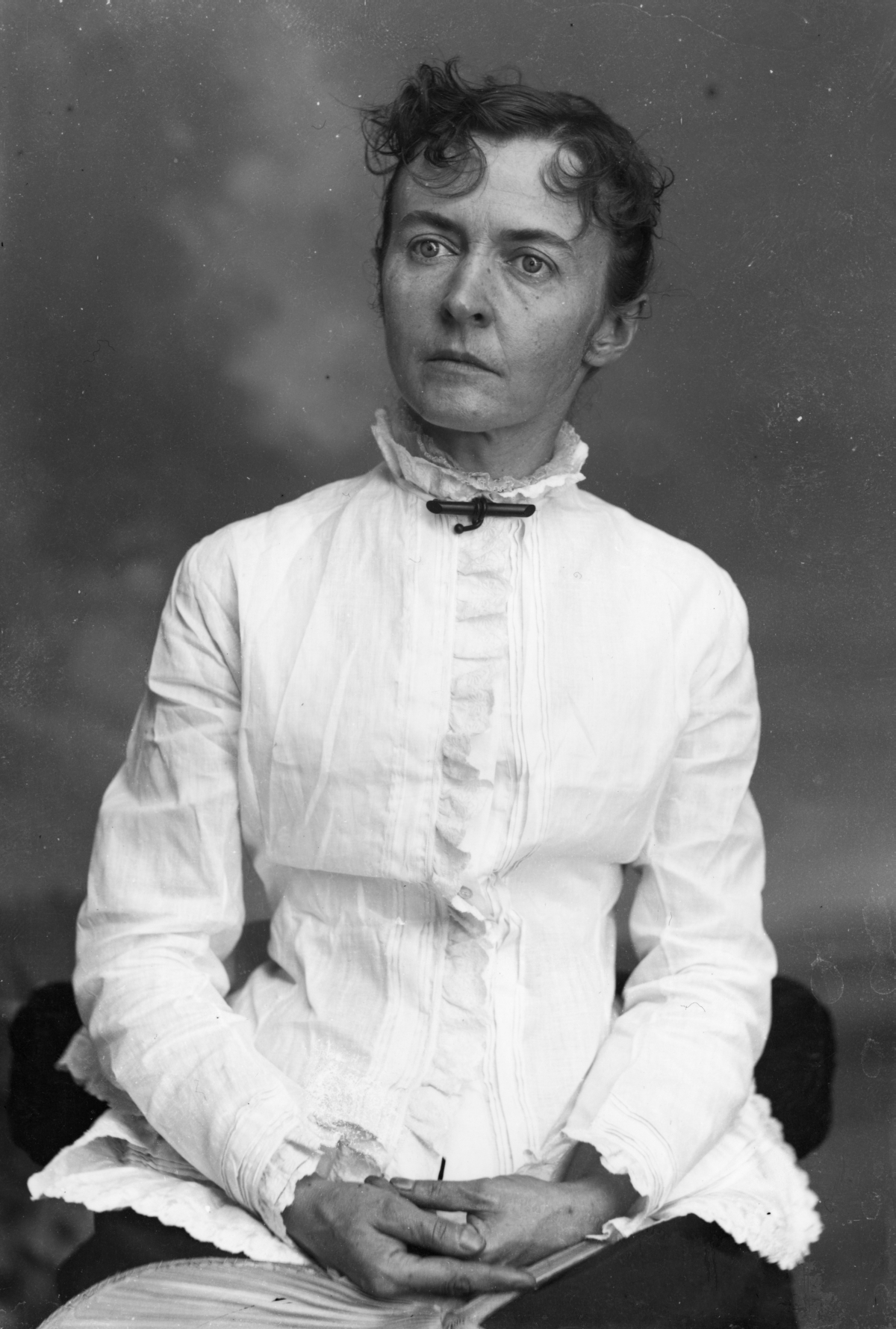
Agnes Walmsley Harper

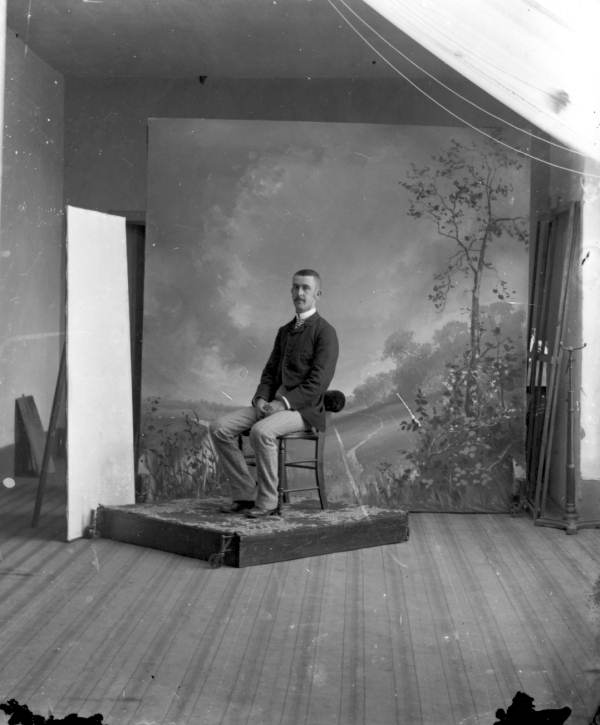
Laurie A. Perkins posed in Harper's studio showing setup and backdrop scenery

Alvan S. Harper (1847– May 19, 1911) was an American photographer who was active in Tallahassee, Florida.

== Biography ==
Harper was born in Norristown, Pennsylvania in 1847 the son of Hannah Pownal Harper and Joseph Harper; he had two sisters. Harper worked as a photographer in Philadelphia before moving to Tallahassee, Florida with his wife Agnes in 1884.

He opened a studio under the name A. S. Harper doing photography and portraits. He posed portraits with backdrops, cabinet photos, and also took photographs of residences, buildings, farming, hunting, railway activity, political leaders, and many local people. Jim Crow segregation was active in Florida when Harper was working. Yet his photos, many of which have middle-class Black people as subjects, show that "African Americans were able to prosper despite the social and legal restrictions they faced.... these images represent the teachers, business owners, and local leaders of Tallahassee's vibrant African American community."

In 1891 he took photographs of the state senators from Florida which were available for viewing at the office of the local newspaper. When fifteen Florida Senators fled to Georgia to try to block the Legislature from deciding a U.S. Senate election, Harper took their photograph and titled it "Fifteen Babes in the Woods - Fugitives from Injustice," and sold large print copies for $3 each.

A book of his photography, Features of the Hill Country, Florida, was published in 1894 by the Commissioners of Leon County with the intent of getting people to move there. His photographs were used to illustrate an article about "the hill country of Florida" in 1896. A review in Picturescope magazine said they reflect "a small rather bucolic state capital." In 1903 he was the photographer for the Florida State College yearbook, The Argo.

In 1905, Harper was commissioned to produce a series of portraits of Florida's early Supreme Court Justices, a total of 33 men. He based them on earlier images, where he could find them, or photographs he took himself. He drew them in crayon and retouched the works with charcoal. The originals were lost. For a week in April 1907 he was offering free sittings for Florida Congressmen (an offer which was hastily withdrawn) and was the staff photographer for the Morning Sun newspaper.

== Rediscovery of work ==
Some of Harper's negatives were lost when his photography studio was demolished in the 1920s. They had been given to a Tallahassee historian who left them outside because they were dirty and they were mistaken for trash and disposed of. Two thousand additional glass negatives were found in 1946 in the attic of a house he had formerly owned. The negatives were turned over to the State Library of Florida and transferred to the Florida Photographic Collection when it was founded in 1952. In 1984, a Supreme Court employee found some photographs in a storage area in the building's sub-basement which turned out to be ten of the original Harper portraits.

The collection includes about 200 portraits of people from his years in Philadelphia, some of whom have been identified. It also contains one hundred views of Tallahassee buildings and street scenes, along with a few from other locations. The collection also holds 1,300 portraits of groups and individuals, mostly unidentified. They include portraits of middle class African Americans that were used for an exhibit sponsored by the Florida State Archives.

== Death and legacy ==
Harper died in Tallahassee in 1911. He and his wife are buried in the Old City Cemetery. The University of Florida published an album of his work including a short biography, an explanation of the rediscovery of a set of his glass plates, notations on the images, as well as media accounts of his history and photos. A book of his photographs was published in 1986, The Photographs of Alvan S. Harper: Tallahassee, 1885-1910, and was reviewed in the Southern Historian. A travelling exhibition of select photographs he took of African Americans has been made into a travelling exhibition by the Museum of Florida.

In 2017 a "Trolley ride through Alvan S. Harper's Tallahassee" was held. An exhibition of a selection of his photographs of African Americans was held at the Wentworth Museum in Pensacola 2016.

== Gallery ==
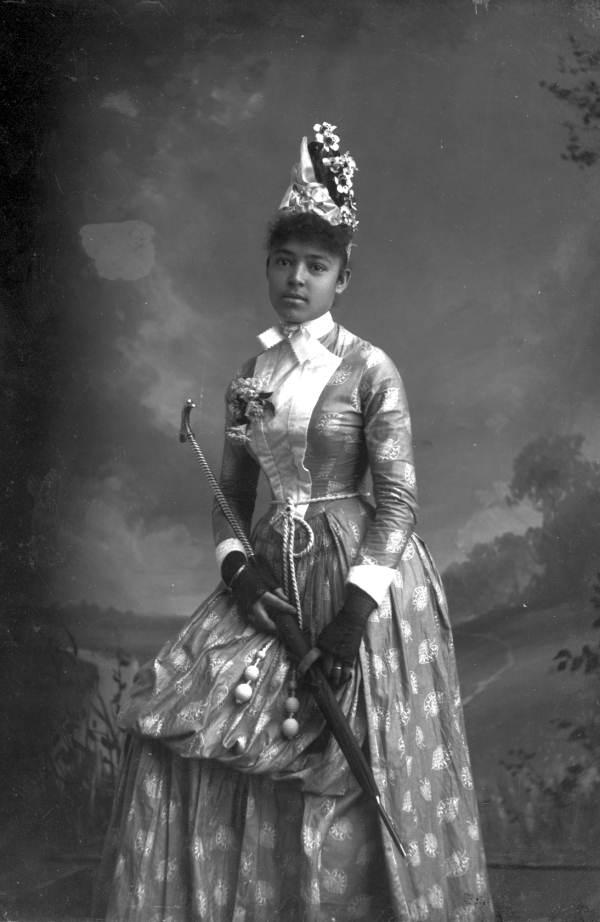
Nellie Franklin holding a parasol

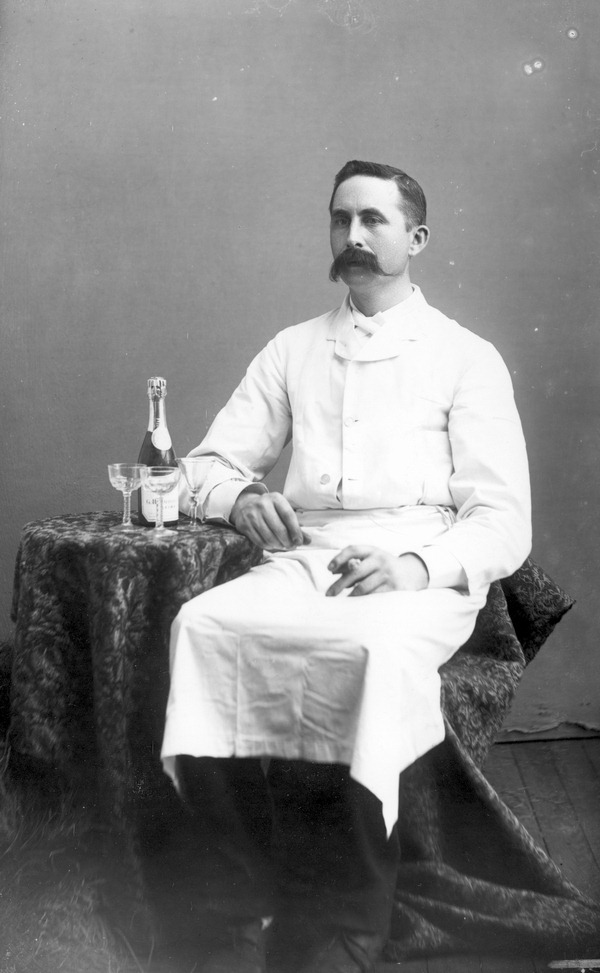
"Hawkins Ball's Bar", server

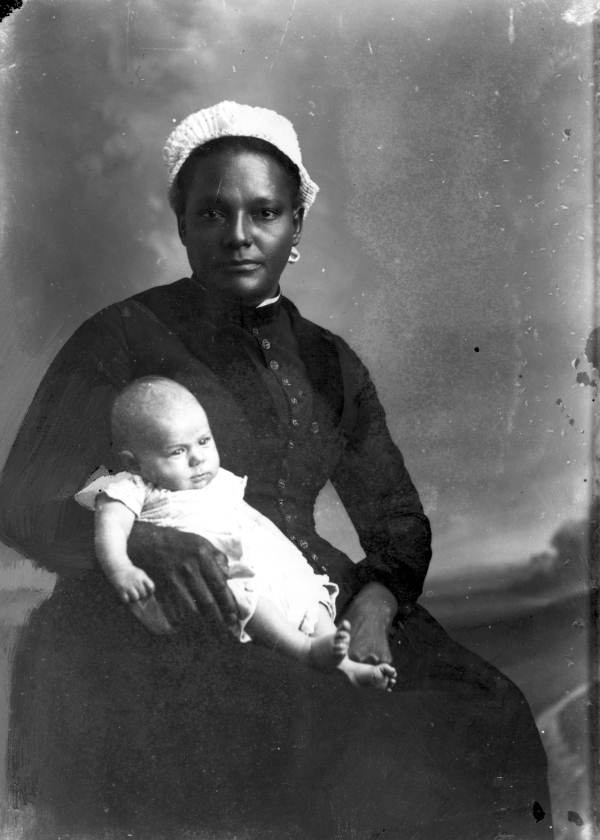
White-capped nurse holding an infant

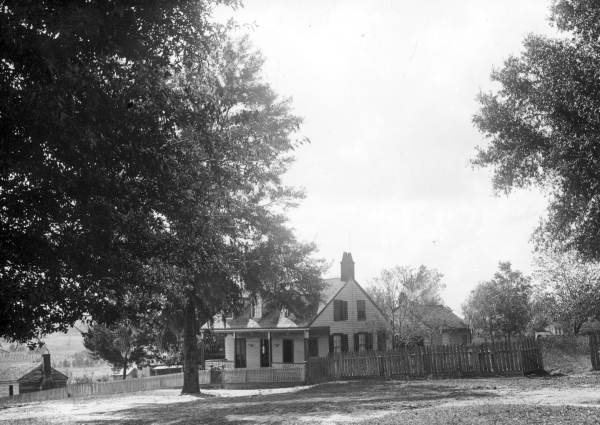
Alvan Harper's House

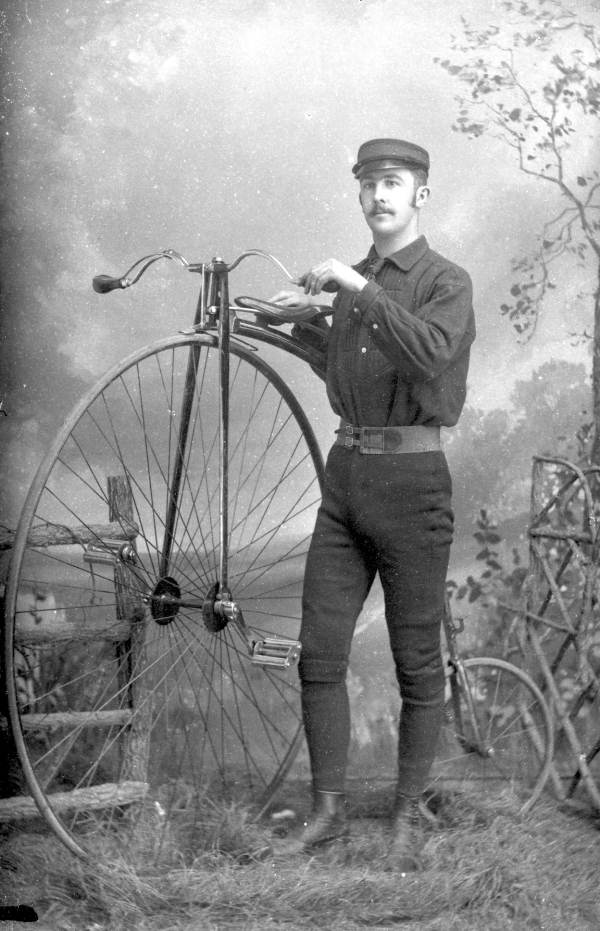
Laurie A. Perkins with a penny-farthing bicycle

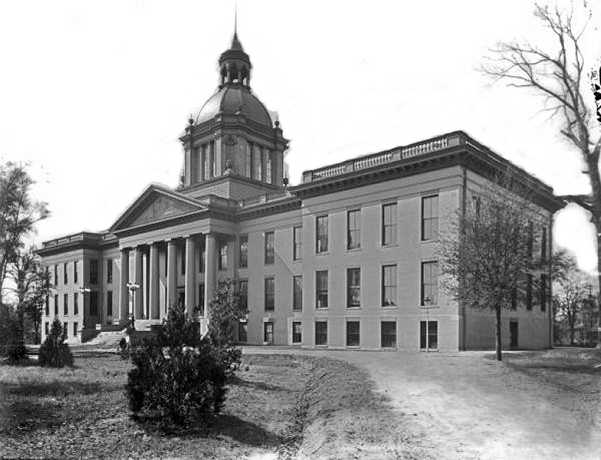
Florida State Capitol

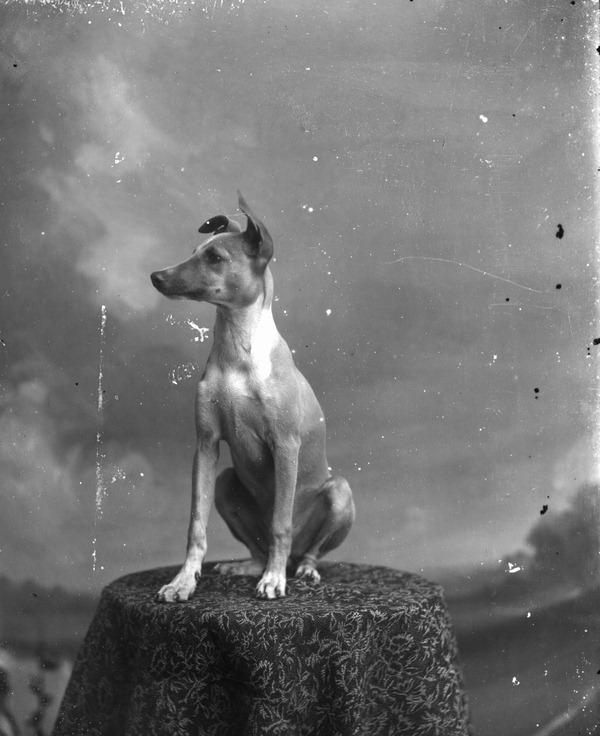
Dog posed on table

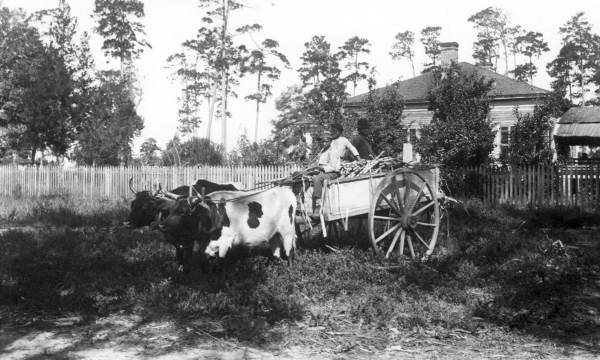
Three boys hauling sugarcane to the mill

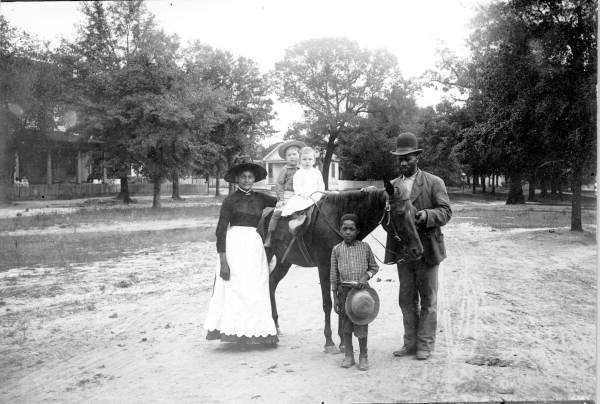
Winthrop children Francis and Guy Winthrop on horseback with attendants

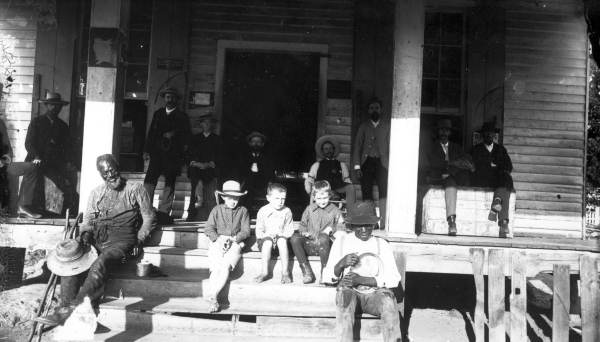
Porch scene

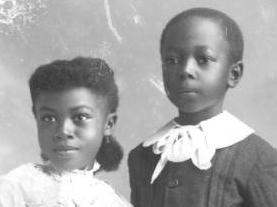
Children

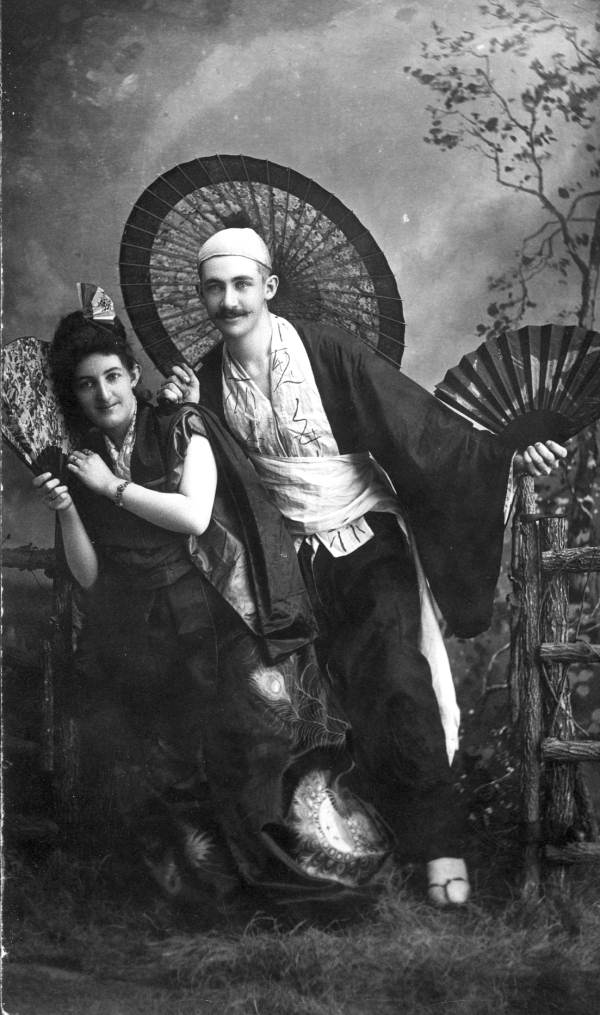
Costumed performers in the show Mikado at Gallie's Hall, April 13, 1887

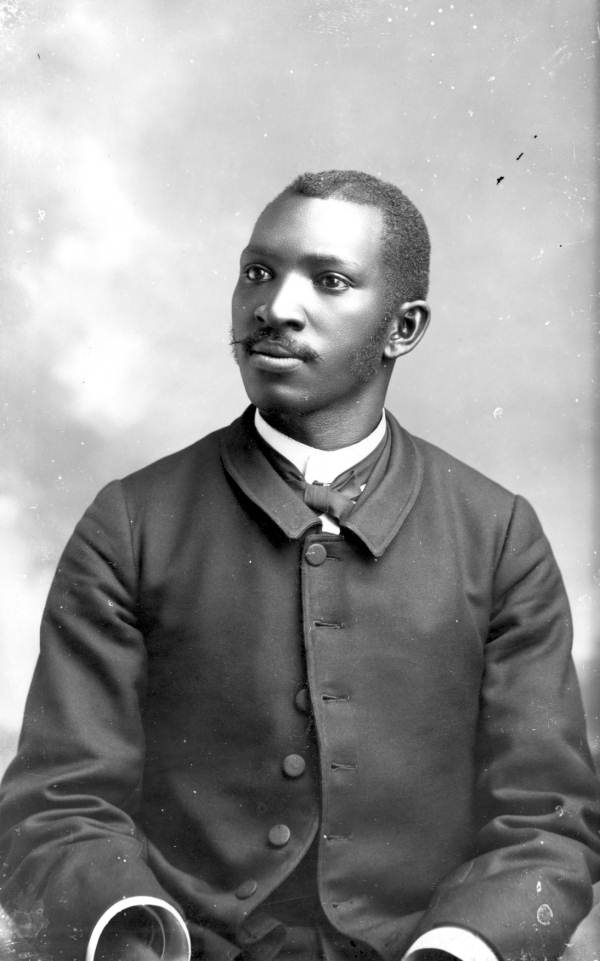
Seated man

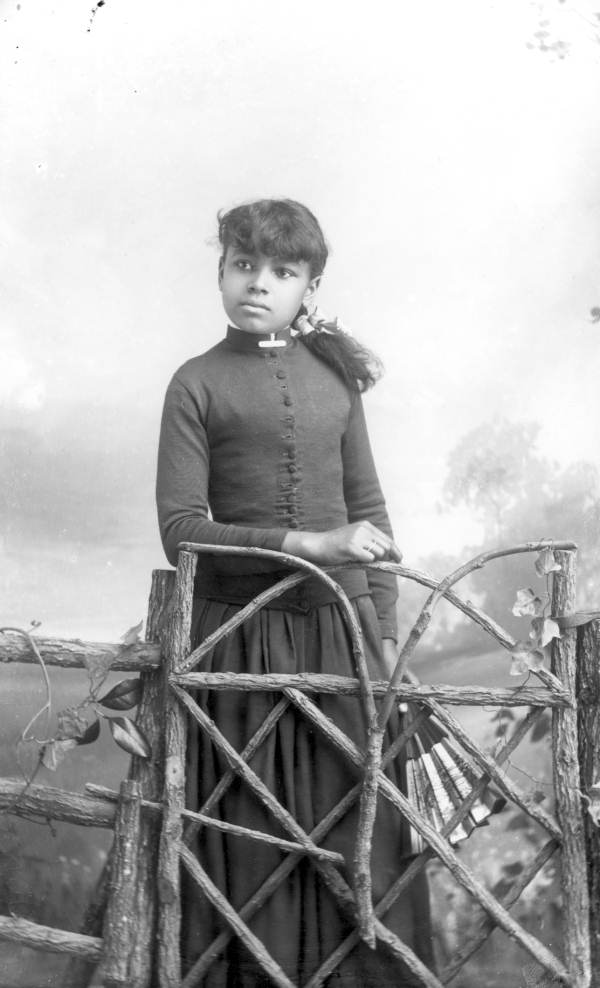
Girl holding a fan behind a wooden gate

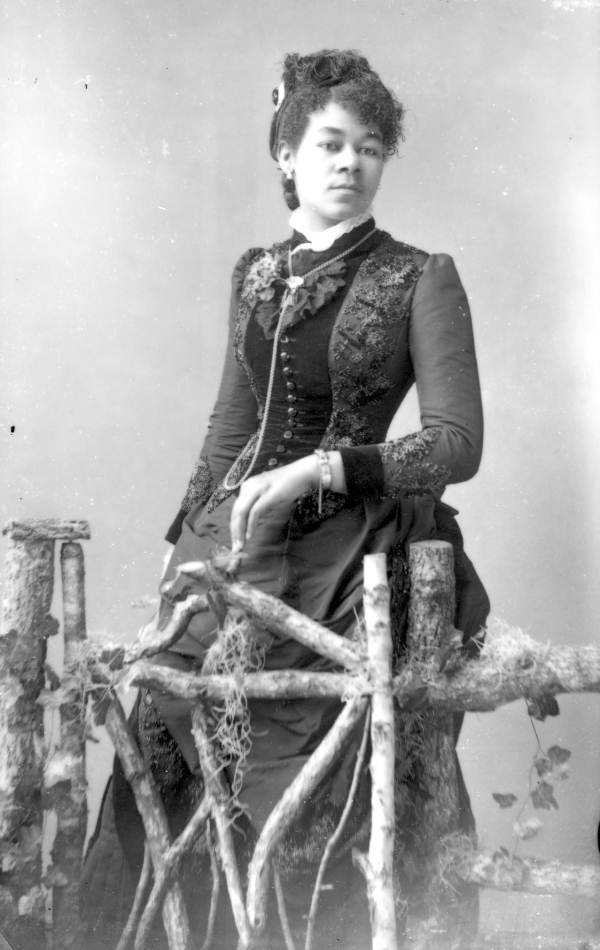
Rosebud Denham in embossed dress

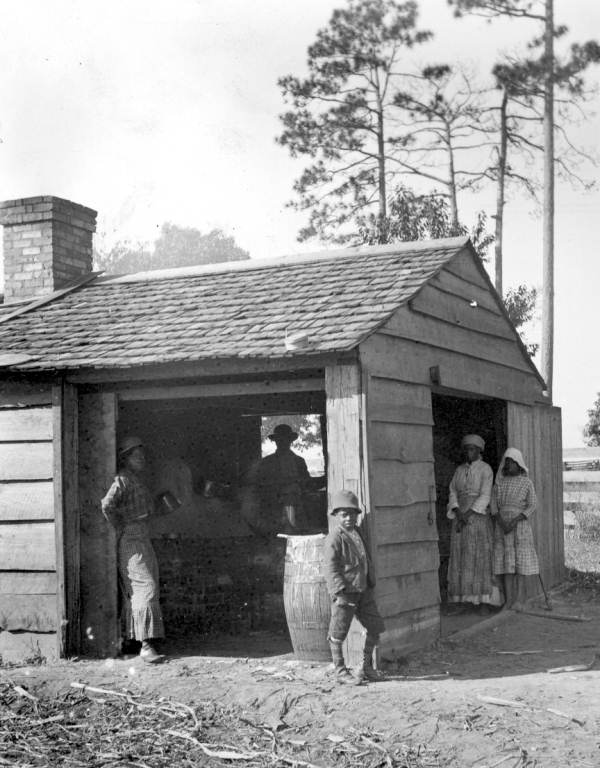
Boiling cane syrup

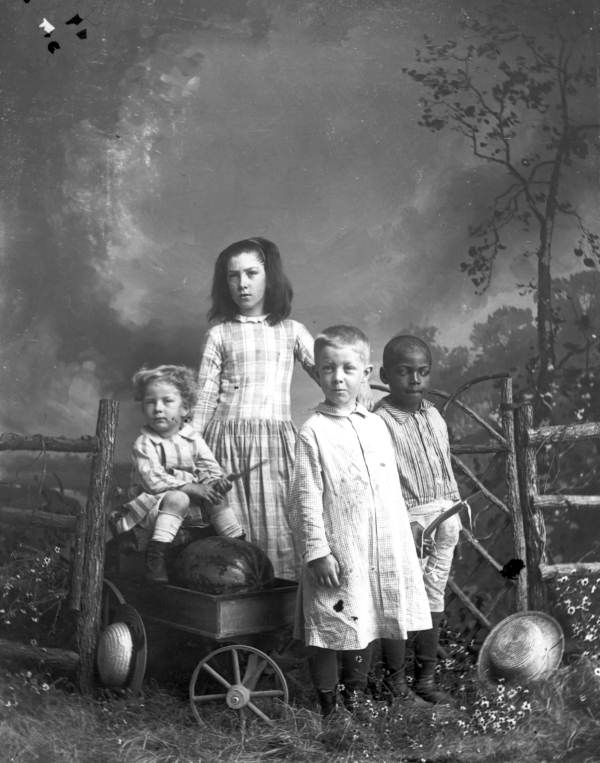
Children in play clothes
