= Charles H. Rollins =

Florida businessman and politician

Charles H. Rollins (December 2, 1832 - August 23, 1919) was a carpenter, shoemaker, and politician in Florida. He served as a Leon County Commissioner from 1874-1877 and in the Florida House of Representatives for Leon County in 1883.

The Rollins House at 5456 Rollins Pointe in Tallahassee is listed on the National Register of Historic Places.

The Florida Archives have a black and white negative of him.

He was buried at the Old City Cemetery in Tallahassee.

== See also ==
- African American officeholders from the end of the Civil War until before 1900
