= Tallahassee Historic District Zones I And II =

Historic districts in Florida, United States

- U.S. National Register of Historic Places
- U.S. Historic district
- Location within Florida Location within the United States
- Location: Tallahassee, Florida
- Coordinates: 30°26′46″N 84°16′46″W
- Area: 11 acres (0.045 km^{2})
- NRHP reference No.: 72000337
- Added to NRHP: October 26, 1972

The Tallahassee Historic District Zones I And II is a U.S. historic district in Tallahassee, Florida. One zone runs along Calhoun Street between Georgia and Tennessee Streets; the other along East Park Avenue between Gadsden and Calhoun Streets. The district encompasses approximately 11 acres (4.5 ha), and contains 17 buildings and 1 structure. On October 26, 1972, it was added to the U.S. National Register of Historic Places.

Parts of them are included in the Calhoun Street Historic District and the Park Avenue Historic District.
