= Jake Gaither Golf Course =

Golf course and community center in Tallahassee, Florida

The Jake Gaither Golf Course is a nine-hole municipal golf course in Tallahassee, Florida, United States. Opened in December 1956, it was originally opened as a course for African Americans during the time of segregation. The course is named after Jake Gaither, the former Florida A&M University football coach. It has served as a space for black golfers, the home course for Florida A&M men's golf team, and a historical marker for civil rights in Tallahassee. The space remains in operation in Tallahassee and has been recognized by the state of Florida with a Florida Historical Marker for its historical and cultural significance.

== Founding and history ==
In 1952, the City of Tallahassee purchased 190 acres of land from the Southern Packing Company. After requests from the Tallahassee Civic League, the city reserved 120 acres for a public park and golf course for Black residents. On May 20, 1953, the park was dedicated and opened as Southwest Park. The day before, local citizens met to form the Capital City Golf Association to support and encourage the development of the golf course.

On Dec 2, 1953, the City Commission announced they would be naming the park and course after the local Florida A&M University football coach Jake Gaither. Jake Gaither had already gained national recognition through his success as a football coach. The course remained under construction throughout 1954 and 1955, with Clifford E. "Sonny" Hay Jr. and William "Crum" Crumbie supervising the design and construction. William Crumbie would eventually become the course's first manager.

The course was founded during the Tallahassee bus boycott (1956–1957) and the privatization of Capital City Country Club, Tallahassee's former municipal course. With the privatization of Capital City, Jake Gaither became the only course where African Americans could play freely.

== Impact and modern use ==
The Jake Gaither Golf Course became a hub for African American golf in Florida. Black golfers such as William "Crum" Crumbie, Leroy Kilpatrick, and Johnny Lee Brown played at Jake Gaither, and the Florida A&M University golf team used Jake Gaither as their home course from the 1950s through the early 1970s.

The course was renovated in 1997 and reopened on August 1, 1998. After reopening, the course featured improvements, including new greens, tees, bunkers, and a new irrigation system. It is a par-36 course spanning between 2,475 and 3,109 yards.

Today, Jake Gaither is open to the public as a city amenity of Tallahassee. In 2020, the par 5 600-yard sixth hole was recognized in the Tallahassee Democrat as one of the city's most memorable holes. The course is commemorated with a Florida Historical Marker, showing its cultural importance and stake in Tallahassee's Black History

== Course layout ==
The course layout is as follows:

Tee	Rating/Slope	1	2	3	4	5	6	7	8	9	Total
Par		4	5	4	4	3	5	4	3	4	36
Blue		393	505	314	372	131	598	269	189	301	3072
