= Old City Waterworks =

- U.S. National Register of Historic Places
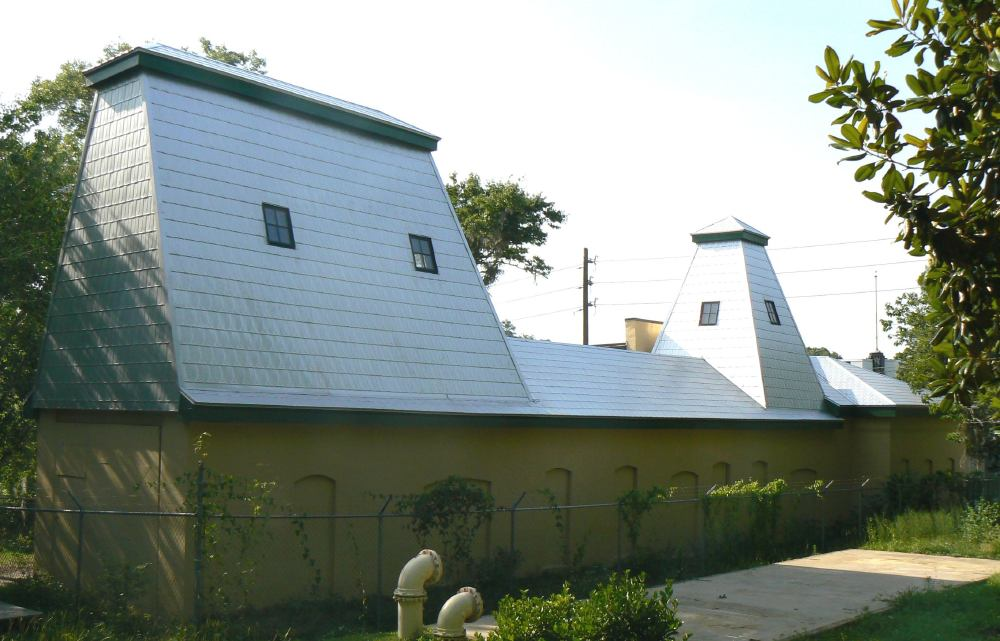
- Old City Waterworks

- Location within Florida Location within the United States
- Location: Tallahassee, Florida
- Coordinates: 30°26′8″N 84°16′41″W
- NRHP reference No.: 79000680
- Added to NRHP: January 31, 1979

The Old City Waterworks is a historic site in Tallahassee, Florida. It is located at East Gaines and South Gadsden Streets. On January 31, 1979, it was added to the US National Register of Historic Places.

Prior to the Old City Waterworks, water was obtained from springs. By 1890 public works for water was needed for firefighting and the health of Tallahassee's citizens and the Old City Waterworks was built in 1904 on Gaines Street. The current building was remodeled in the 1920s to 1930s and closed in 1980.

Currently the building has been adapted for reuse as Amicus Brewing Ventures, an award-winning craft beer brewery and taproom.
