= Flavius C. Coles Farmhouse =

- U.S. National Register of Historic Places
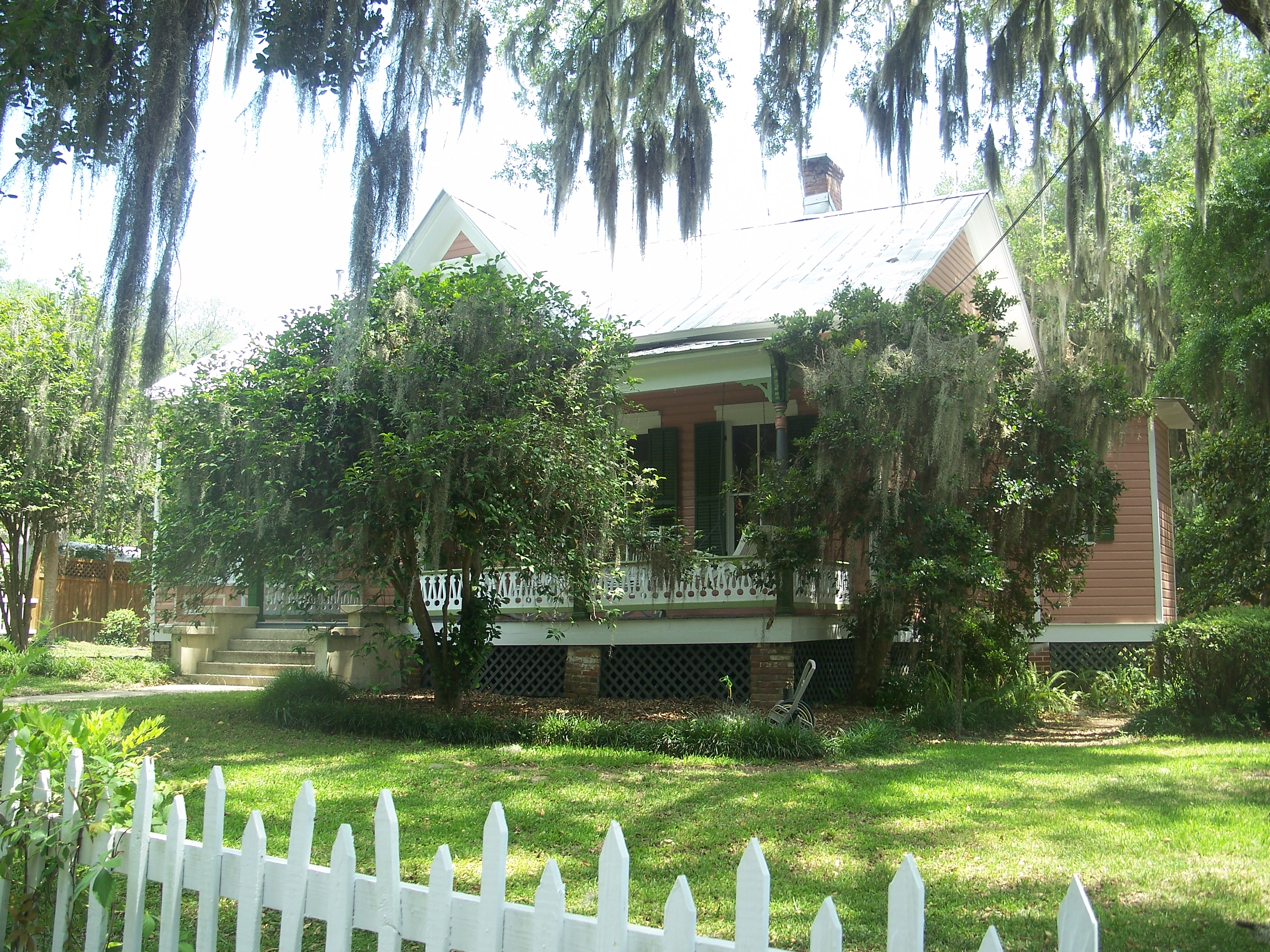

- Location within Florida Location within the United States
- Location: Tallahassee, Florida
- Coordinates: 30°25′52″N 84°16′41″W
- NRHP reference No.: 91001911
- Added to NRHP: January 7, 1992

The Flavius C. Coles Farmhouse is a historic site in Tallahassee, Florida. It is located at 411 Oakland Avenue. On January 7, 1992, it was added to the U.S. National Register of Historic Places.
