= Ruge Hall =

- U.S. National Register of Historic Places
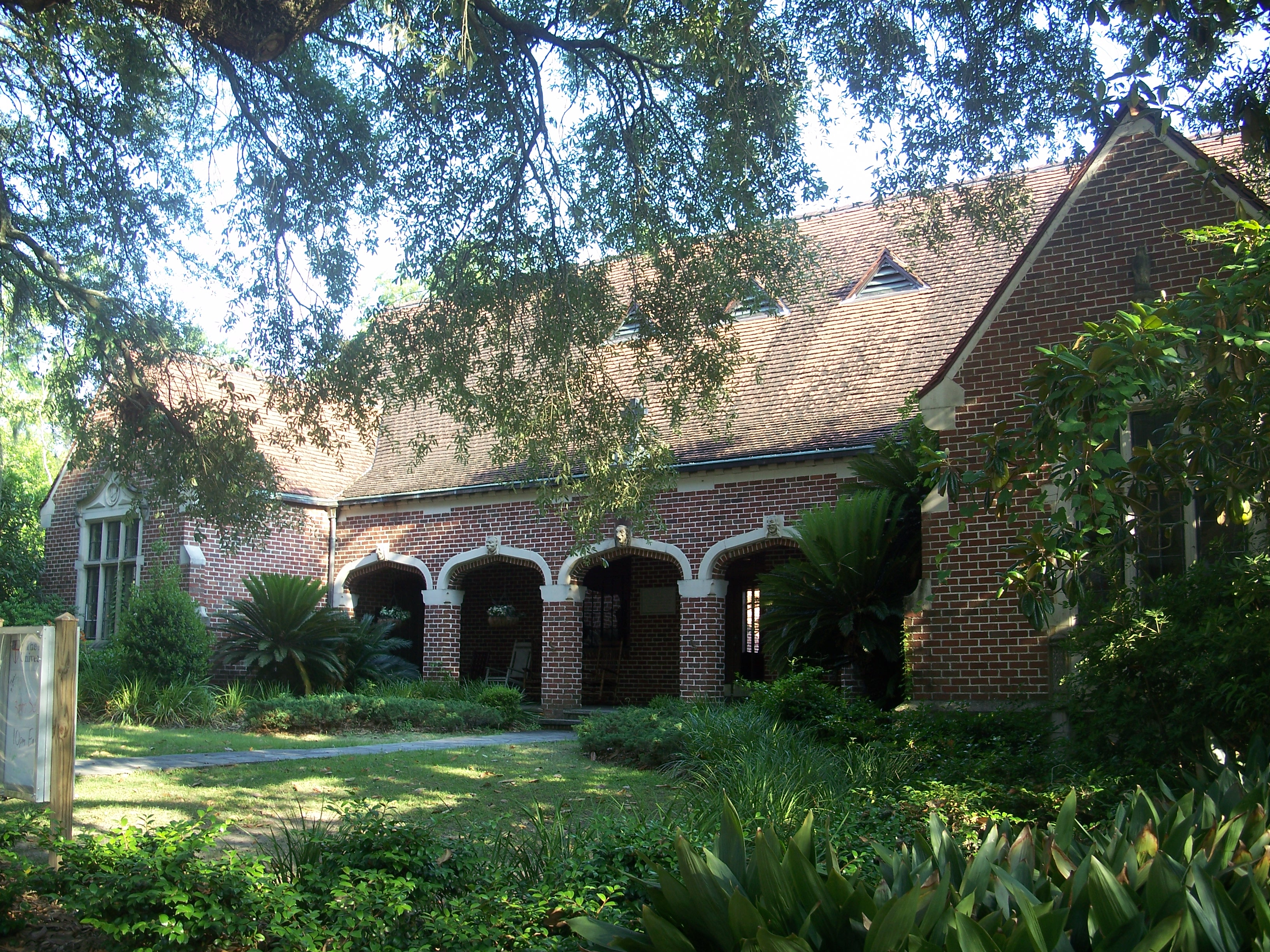

- Location within Florida Location within the United States
- Location: Tallahassee, Florida
- Coordinates: 30°26′21″N 84°17′35″W
- Architect: Edward D. Fitchner
- Architectural style: Late Gothic Revival
- NRHP reference No.: 97000838
- Added to NRHP: August 1, 1997

Ruge Hall is an historic site located at 655 West Jefferson Street in Tallahassee, Florida. It serves as the Episcopal Diocese of Florida's center for ministry to Florida State University. On August 1, 1997, it was added to the U.S. National Register of Historic Places.

== History ==
The Ruge Hall Episcopal Student Center was built by John G. Ruge of Apalachicola as a memorial to his wife, Fannie Ruge, in 1931. It was built to serve as the Episcopal Chapel of the Resurrection on the campus of Florida State College for Women. Ruge Hall served as a place for worship and fellowship, as well as a residence for the Episcopal Chaplain. A new Chapel of the Resurrection was built in the 1950s adjacent to Ruge Hall and the old building became known as Ruge Hall. Ruge Hall then began to be used as a social hall and for offices. Ruge Hall is on the National Register of Historic Places and is one of the last remaining buildings in Tallahassee designed by the architect Edward D. Fitchner. Today Ruge serves students at Florida State University and the wider Tallahassee community.
