= Gallie's Hall and Buildings =

- U.S. National Register of Historic Places
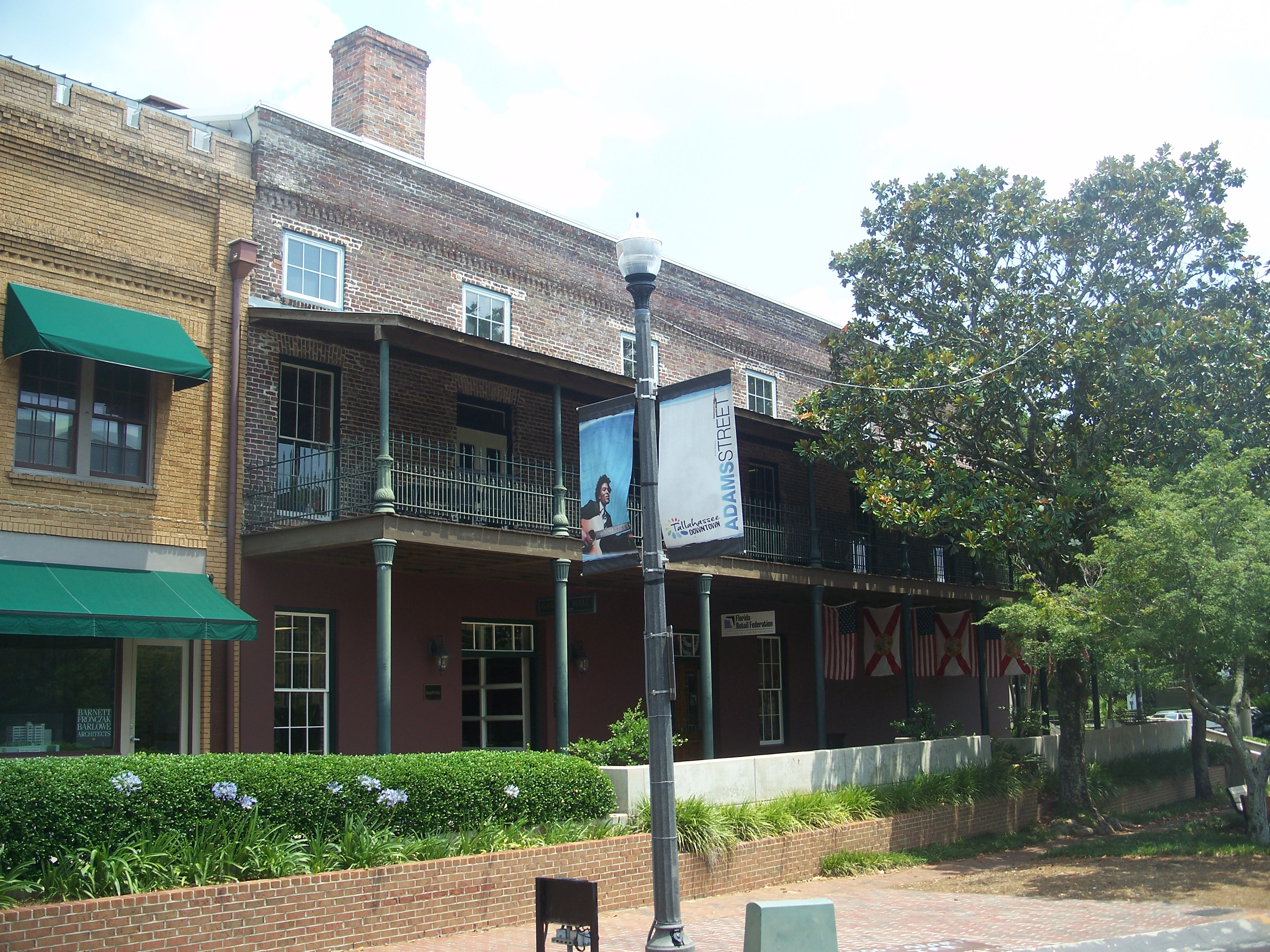

- Location within Florida Location within the United States
- Location: Tallahassee, Florida
- Coordinates: 30°26′23″N 84°16′55″W
- NRHP reference No.: 80000954
- Added to NRHP: October 20, 1980

The Gallie's Hall and Buildings is a historic site in Tallahassee, Florida. It is located on Florida State Road 366, and held the city's first theater and only public hall until 1910. On October 20, 1980, it was added to the U.S. National Register of Historic Places.
