= Frederic C. Billingsley =

American engineer

Fred Billingsley, circa 1964

Frederic Crockett Billingsley (23 July 1921 – 31 May 2002) was an American engineer, who spent most of his career developing techniques for digital image processing in support of American space probes to the moon, to Mars, and to other planets.

Billingsley published two papers in 1965 using the word pixel, and may have been the first to publish that neologism for picture element.

He was born in New Orleans, Louisiana, and died in Great Falls, Montana.

== Image processing contributions ==
Billingsley was one of the pioneers of digital image processing mentioned in "THE BEST OF NASA'S SPINOFFS," which says:

There also was a need for hardware to record both analog video and digital images on film. No suitable commercial hardware existed, so JPL's Fred Billingsley designed a system called the Video Film Converter (VFC). Built for JPL by Link General Precision, the VFC was used in the 1970s for image playback of the striking pictures returned by the planetary missions of the unmanned Mariner spacecraft.

The JPL document "Overview of VICAR" shows that Billingsley did software as well as hardware:

The VICAR image processing language was defined by JPL employees Stan Bressler, Howard Frieden and Fred Billingsley, and implemented in 1966 at the Jet Propulsion Laboratory to process image data produced by the planetary exploration program.
