= Old City Cemetery (Tallahassee, Florida) =

Historic site in Leon County, Florida

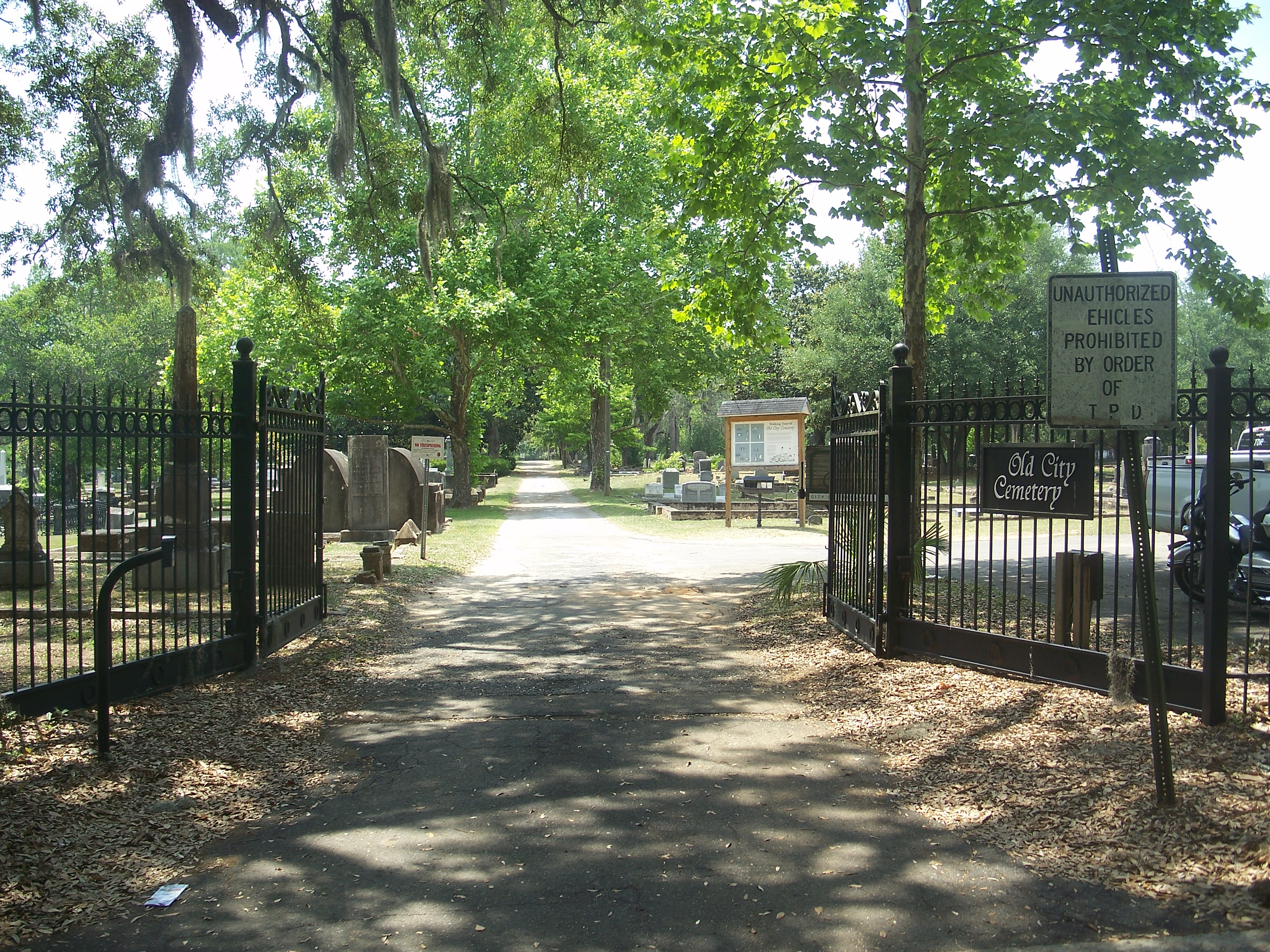
- Interactive map of Old City Cemetery

Details
- Established: 1829
- Location: Tallahassee, Florida
- Coordinates: 30.4427°N 84.2870°W

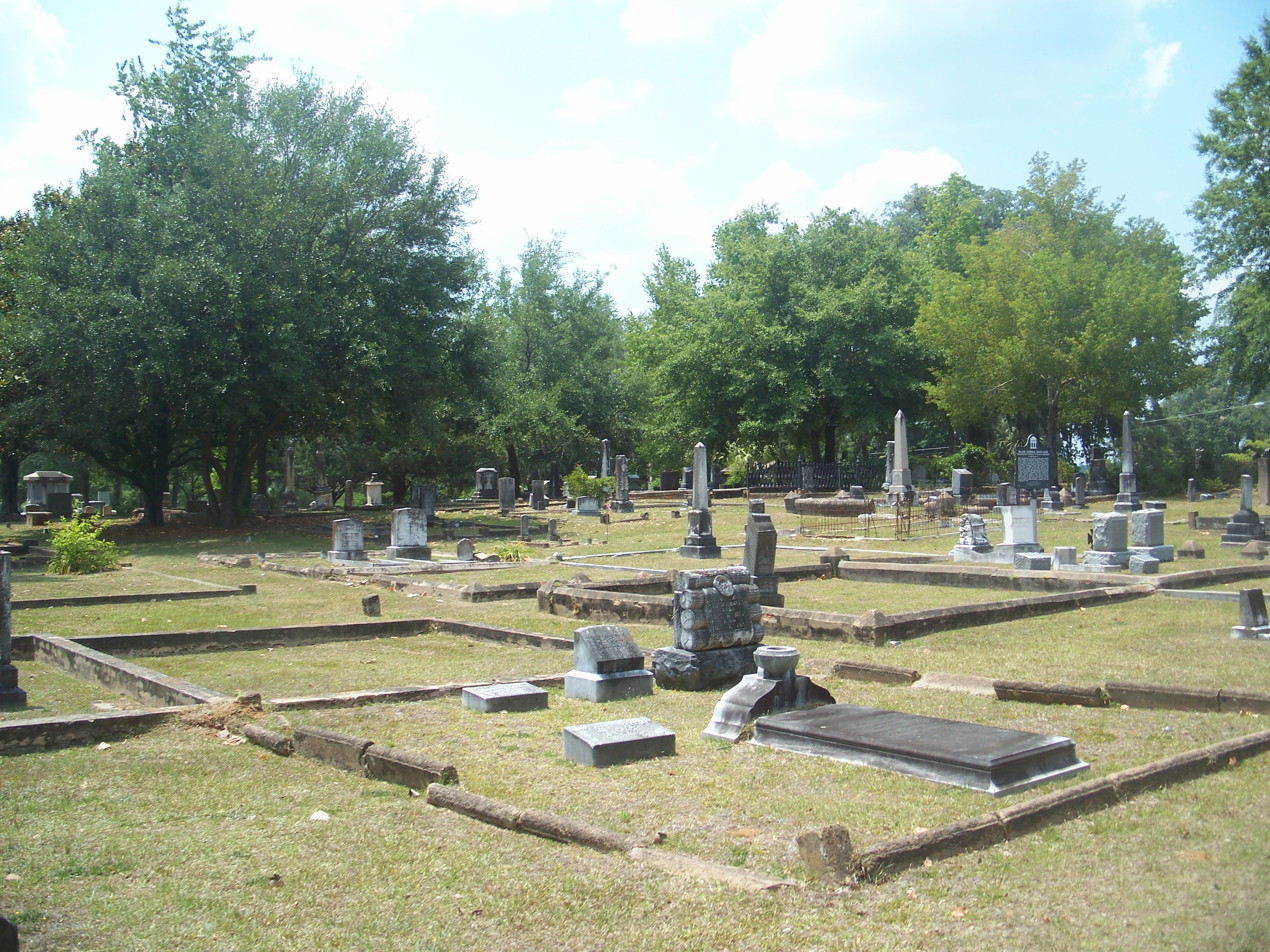

Old City Cemetery is a historic site in Tallahassee, Florida, the state capital. It was established in 1829 by the Territorial Legislative Council, and was acquired by the city in 1840. Burials for white people were segregated with separate areas and books for "colored" people.

Cast iron fences surround the property. A historical marker commemorates its history.

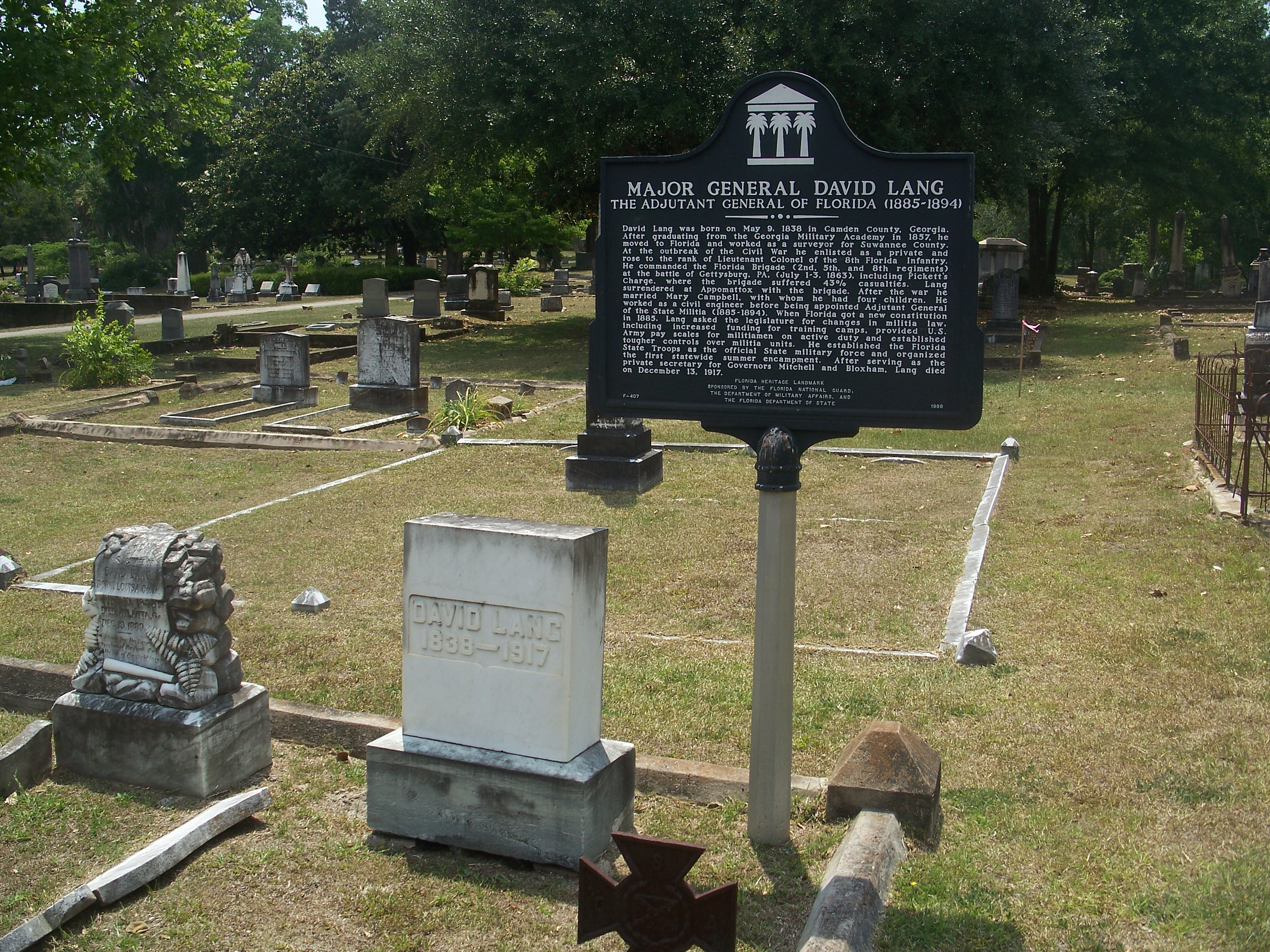
David Lang marker

The Florida Archives have photos of the cemetery. Guided walking tours have been held.

== Burials ==
- Thomas Brown (1785-1867)
- Charles H. Rollins, state legislator
- David Lang
- Reverend James Page
- Judge Alfred LePaire Woodward (1807-1882)
- Ossian Bingley Hart
- James Diament Westcott III (1839-1887), attorney general and justice on the Florida Supreme Court
- Henry Noel Felkel (1850-1897), school principal
- Thomas Van Renssalaer Gibbs
- John G. Collins, founder of Tallahassee Democrat
- Robert Berry Gorman (1837-1919), mayor
- John G. Riley

== See also ==
- Park Avenue Historic District (Tallahassee, Florida)
