= Los Robles Gate =

- U.S. National Register of Historic Places
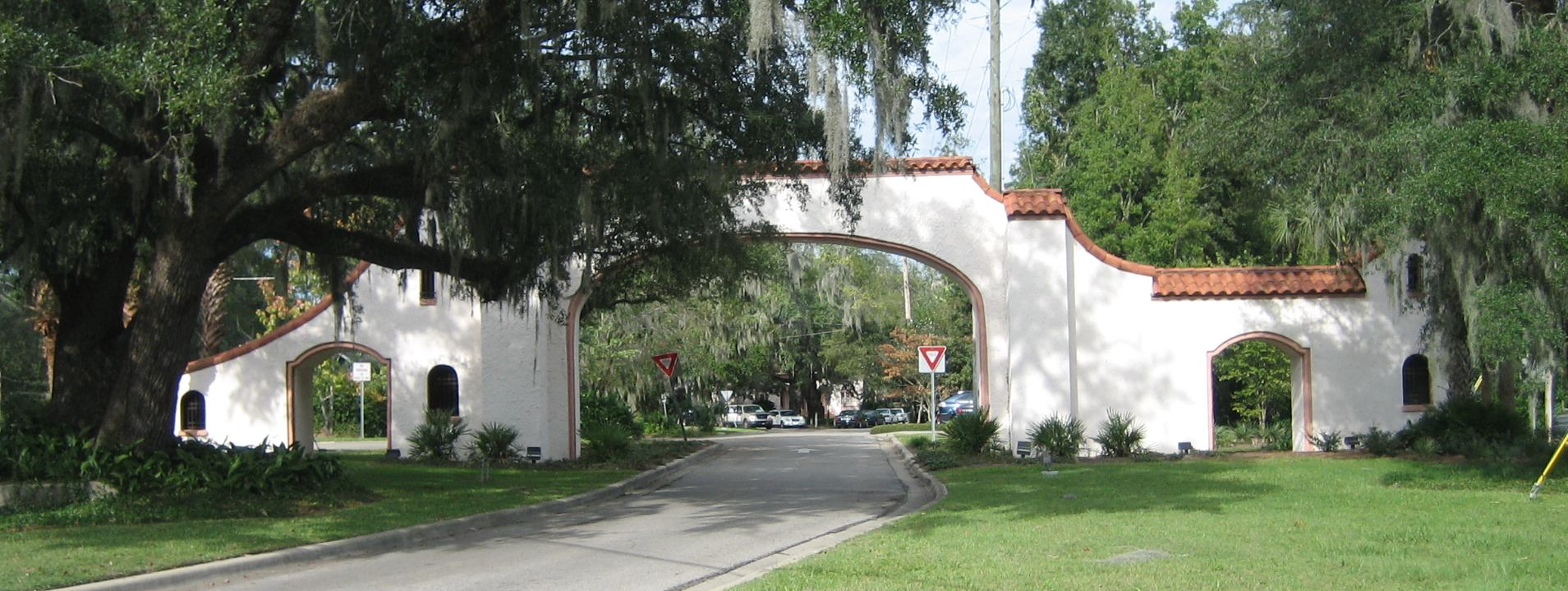

- Location within Florida
- Location: Tallahassee, Florida, USA
- Coordinates: 30°27′27.74″N 84°16′37.79″W
- Built: 1926
- Architect: George Kerr Armes
- Architectural style: Spanish Revival/Colonial Revival
- NRHP reference No.: 89001480
- Added to NRHP: April 16, 1984

The Los Robles Gate is a historic site in Tallahassee, Florida. It is located at the intersection of Thomasville and Meridian Roads. On September 21, 1989, it was added to the U.S. National Register of Historic Places.

The historic Los Robles subdivision, just east of Lake Ella and adjoining midtown, was developed beginning in the 1920s and began a trend of expansion to the north of downtown. The 37-acre parcel is a triangular tract that was an early planned community of approximately 100 homes.

Los Robles is Spanish for "The Oak Trees" named after the centuries-old live oaks throughout the neighborhood. The streets have Spanish names and some of the houses feature Spanish-style architecture including stucco exteriors and ceramic roof tiles.

After decades of neglect the gate underwent a $150,000 restoration in 2006, with a steel structural arch and new Ludowici tiles.
