= Pisgah United Methodist Church =

Historic church in Florida, United States

- U.S. National Register of Historic Places
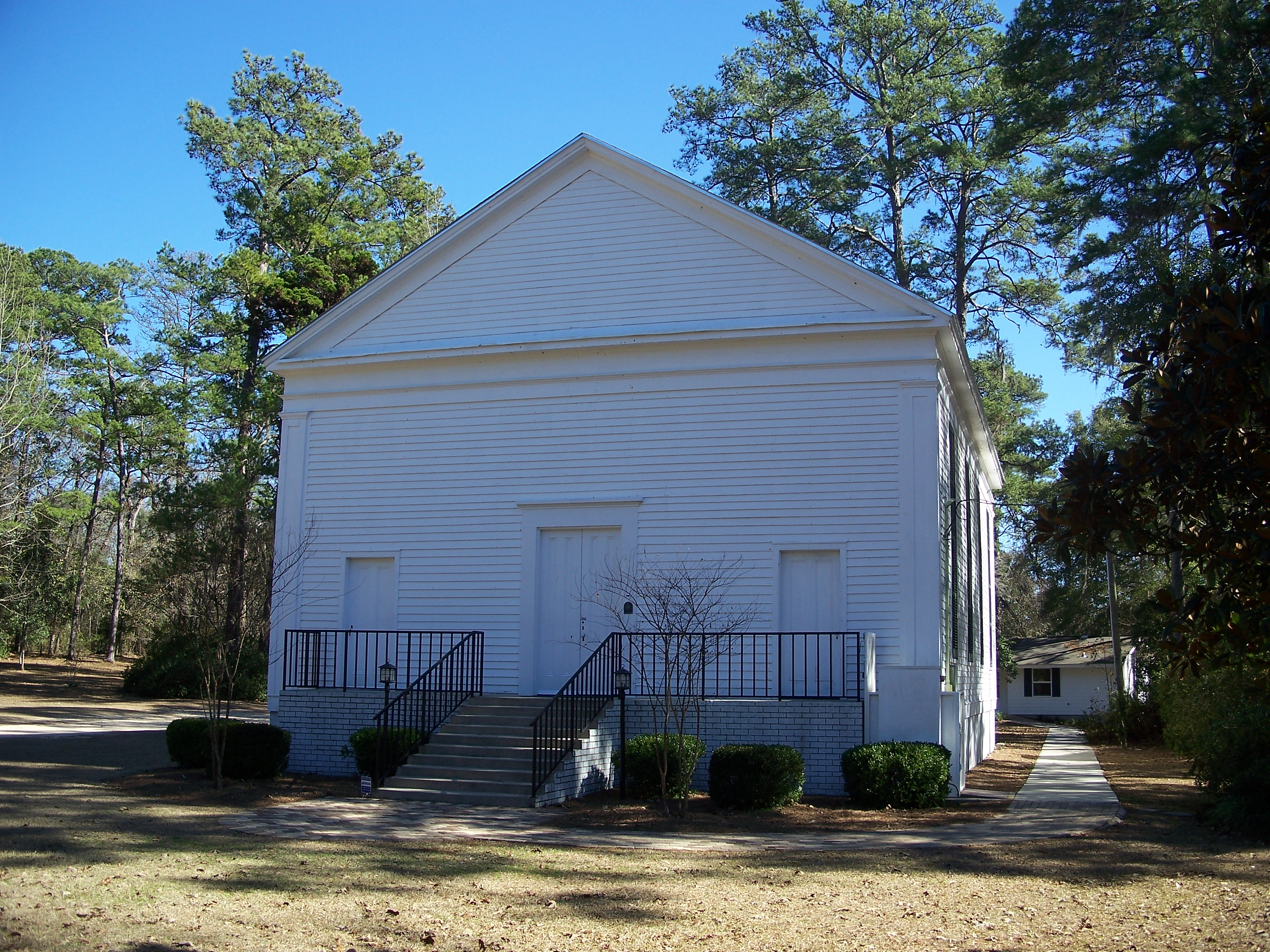

- Location within Florida Location within the United States
- Location: Leon County, Florida
- Nearest city: Tallahassee
- Coordinates: 30°33′6″N 84°9′25″W
- NRHP reference No.: 74000650
- Added to NRHP: May 3, 1974

The Pisgah United Methodist Church (also known as the Old Pisgah Church) is a historic church north of Tallahassee, Leon County, Florida, United States. It is located southeast of State Road 151 at the end of Pisgah Church Road. On May 3, 1974, it was added to the U.S. National Register of Historic Places.

A Greek Revival style building, the Pisgah United Methodist Church is the oldest remaining Methodist church building in Leon County. The current 1858 structure is the third church to be located on that site. It had a broad front porch preceded the three front doors. The east and west sides of the church have 4 elongated windows.

== History ==
In 1824, Tallahassee was the territorial capitol and the Methodists of the area was serviced by traveling Methodist circuit riders. The church or "Society" with 34 members at Pisgah was established on May 3, 1830, by John Slade. Slade is considered as the father of Methodism in Florida.

In 1863, Reverend Richardson was elected Captain of the Centerville Old Guard and served with other Leon County men during the Civil War. Several soldiers are buried at the Pisgah cemetery including members of the Gramling family.

A non-segregated church, white women were required to sit on one side of the church, and white men on the other. Slaves were seated in the galleries. The cemetery at Pisgah holds victims of the 1841 yellow fever epidemic.
