= Williams House (Tallahassee, Florida) =

Historic house in Florida, United States

- White House
- U.S. National Register of Historic Places
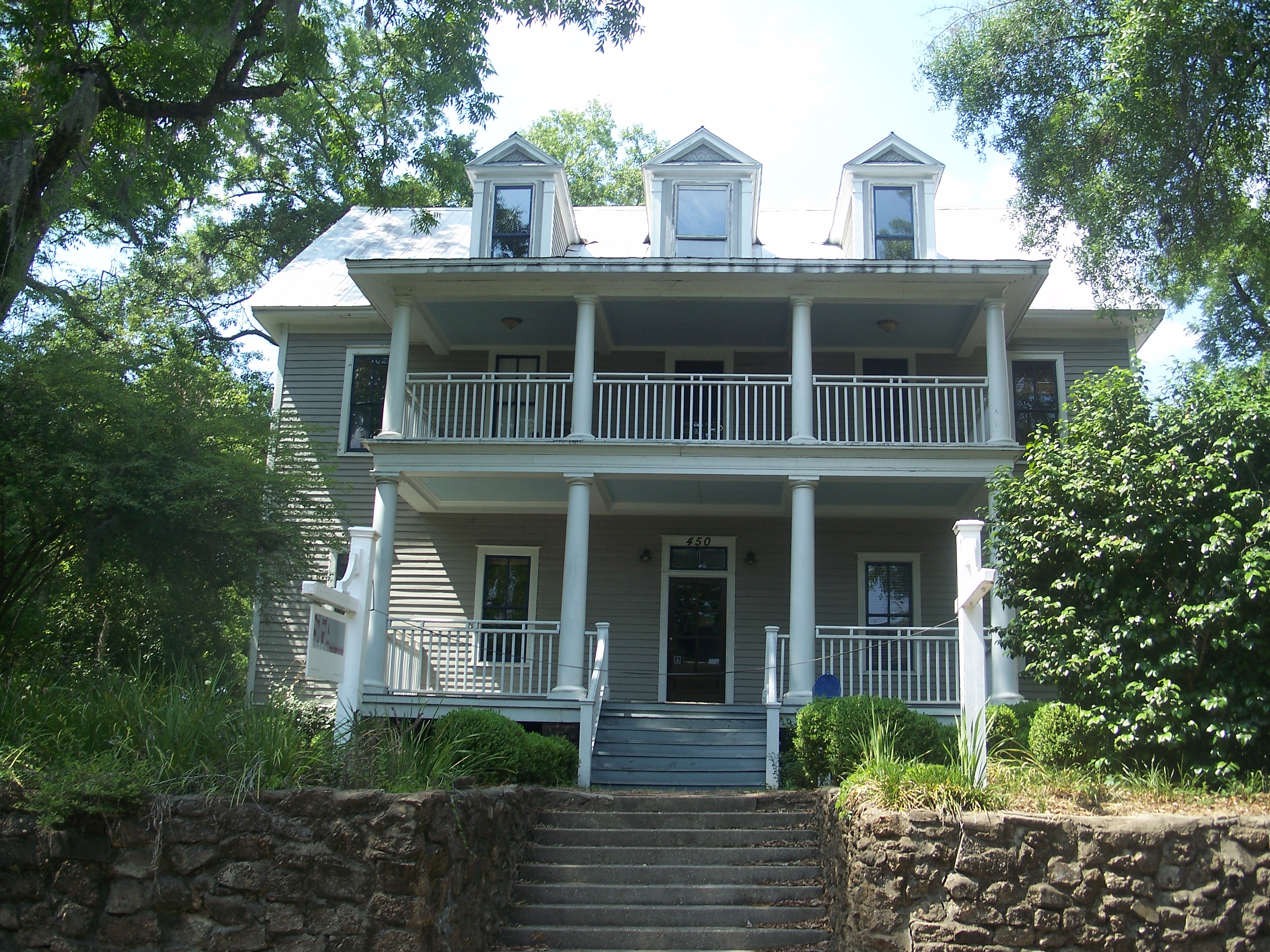

- Location within Florida Location within the United States
- Location: Tallahassee, Florida, USA
- Coordinates: 30°26′4″N 84°17′17″W
- NRHP reference No.: 96000360
- Added to NRHP: April 4, 1996

The Williams House (also known as the Swain House or Langston Apts. or Allen Boarding House or White House or Ween Mansion) was a historic home in Tallahassee, Florida, United States. It was located at 450 Saint Francis Street. On April 4, 1996, it was added to the U.S. National Register of Historic Places. By March 24, 2022 it had been demolished along with 12 other properties in the All Saints neighborhood leaving 9 contributing properties for the historic district.
