= Winterle House =

Historic house in Florida, United States

- U.S. National Register of Historic Places
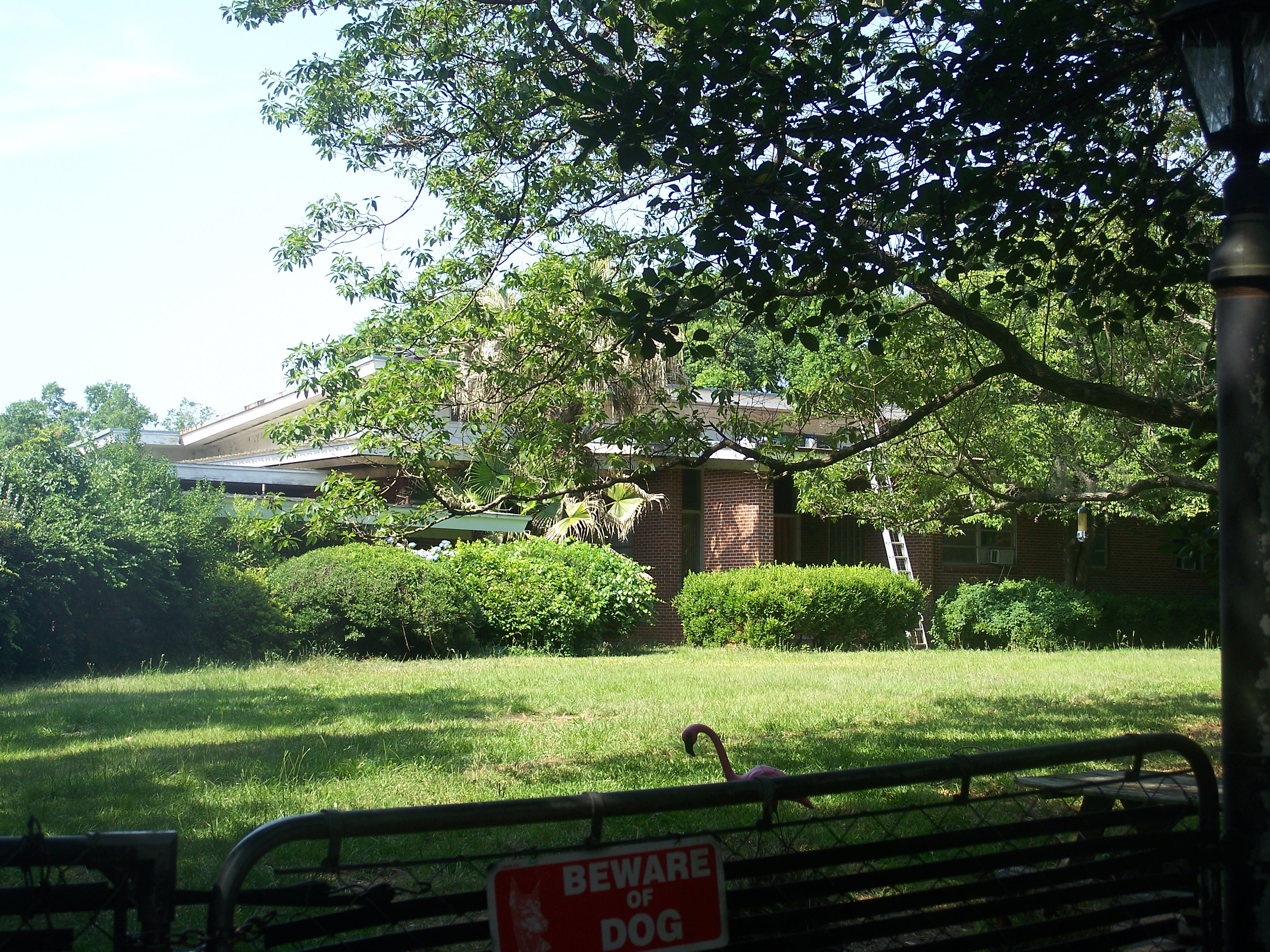

- Location within Florida Location within the United States
- Location: Tallahassee, Florida, USA
- Coordinates: 30°24′17″N 84°15′57″W
- NRHP reference No.: 98000082
- Added to NRHP: February 17, 1998

The Winterle House (also known as Three Stars) is a historic home in Tallahassee, Florida, United States. It is located at 1111 Paul Russell Road. On February 17, 1998, it was added to the U.S. National Register of Historic Places.
