= Meridian Road =

- U.S. National Register of Historic Places
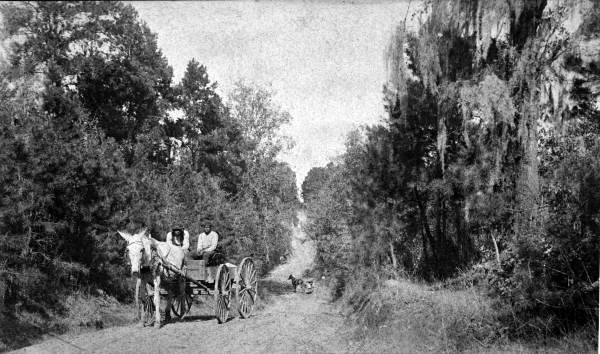

- Location within Florida Location within the United States
- Location: Tallahassee, Florida
- Coordinates: 30°36′13″N 84°17′49″W
- NRHP reference No.: 13000081
- Added to NRHP: March 20, 2013

Meridian Road is a national historic site that runs roughly between John Hancock Dr. in Tallahassee, Florida to Georgia State Line. Its relevance is associated with the development of Leon County, as it was used to move agricultural products from the locals plantations to the capital city.

It was added to the National Register of Historic Places on March 20, 2013.
