= Calhoun Street Historic District =

Historic district in Florida, United States

- U.S. National Register of Historic Places
- U.S. Historic district
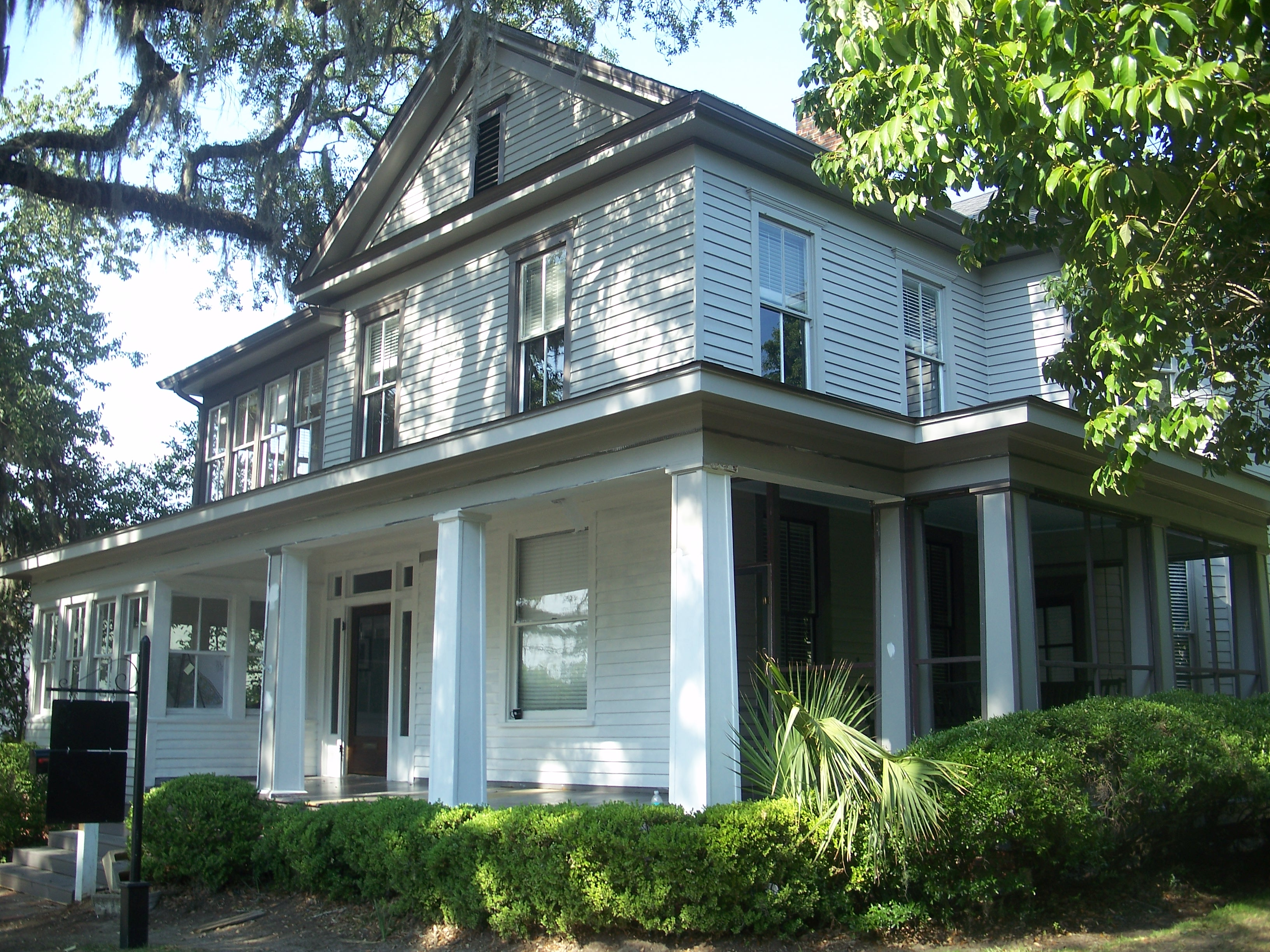

- Location within Florida Location within the United States
- Location: Tallahassee, Florida
- Coordinates: 30°26′47″N 84°16′44″W
- Area: 21 acres (85,000 m^{2})
- NRHP reference No.: 79000677
- Added to NRHP: 24 October 1979

The Calhoun Street Historic District is a U.S. historic district (designated as such on October 24, 1979) located in Tallahassee, Florida. The district is on Calhoun Street between US 90 and SR 61. It contains 16 historic buildings. The district is considered to be one of the oldest standing residential neighborhoods in Tallahassee, dating to the 1840s. Houses on Calhoun Street were primarily built in the periods of 1841-1860 and 1879-1912, at which time the street was nicknamed the "Gold Dust" street for its prosperous residents.
