= Billingsley Farm =

- U.S. National Register of Historic Places
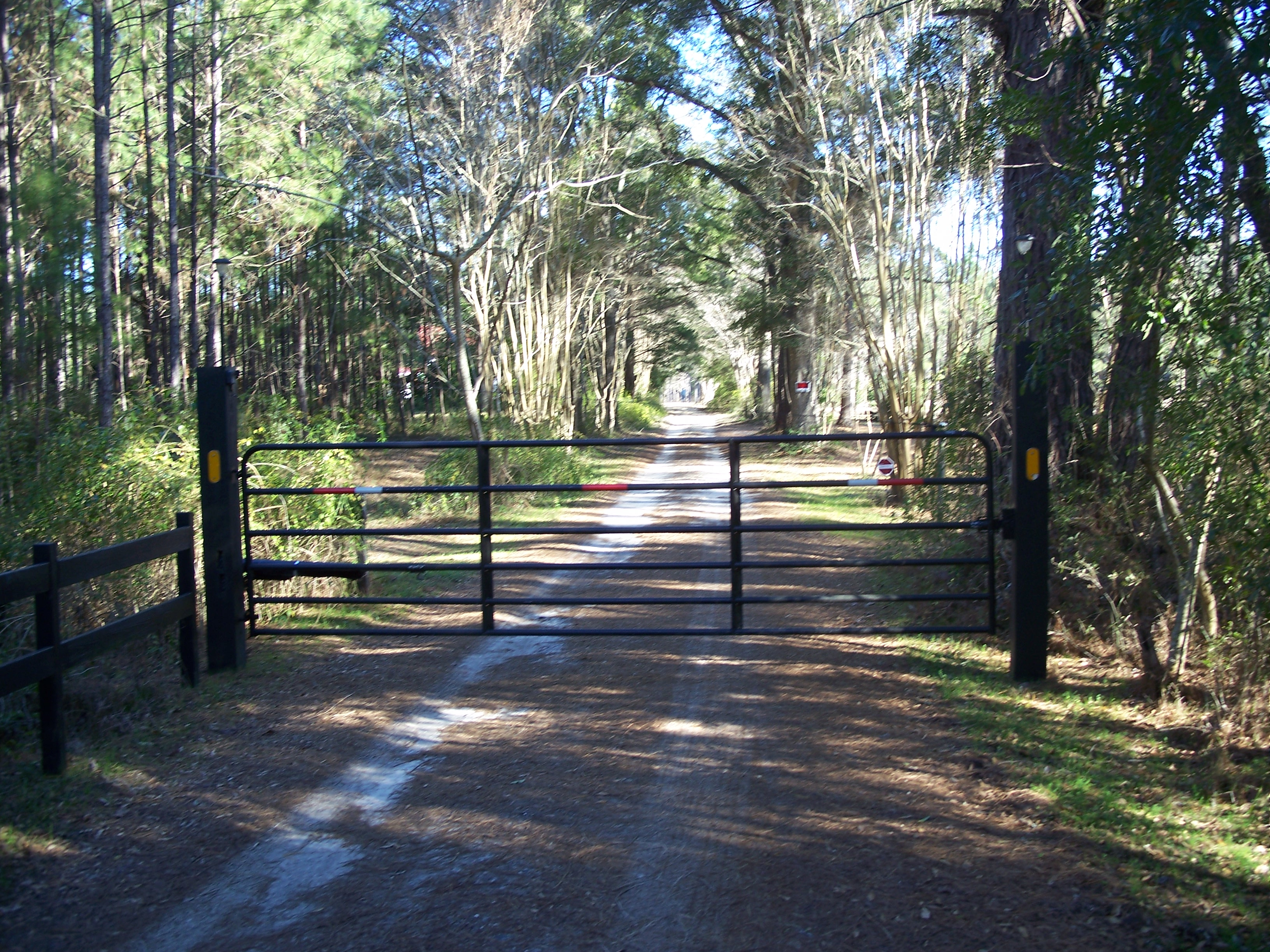

- Location within Florida Location within the United States
- Location: Wadesboro, Florida
- Nearest city: Tallahassee
- Coordinates: 30°30′59.7″N 84°4′29″W
- NRHP reference No.: 07000897
- Added to NRHP: September 5, 2007

The Billingsley Farm is a historic place in Wadesboro, Florida, United States. It is located at 3640 Oakhurst Lane. On September 5, 2007, it was added to the U.S. National Register of Historic Places.
