= John Gilmore Riley House =

Historic house in Florida, United States

- John G Riley House
- U.S. National Register of Historic Places
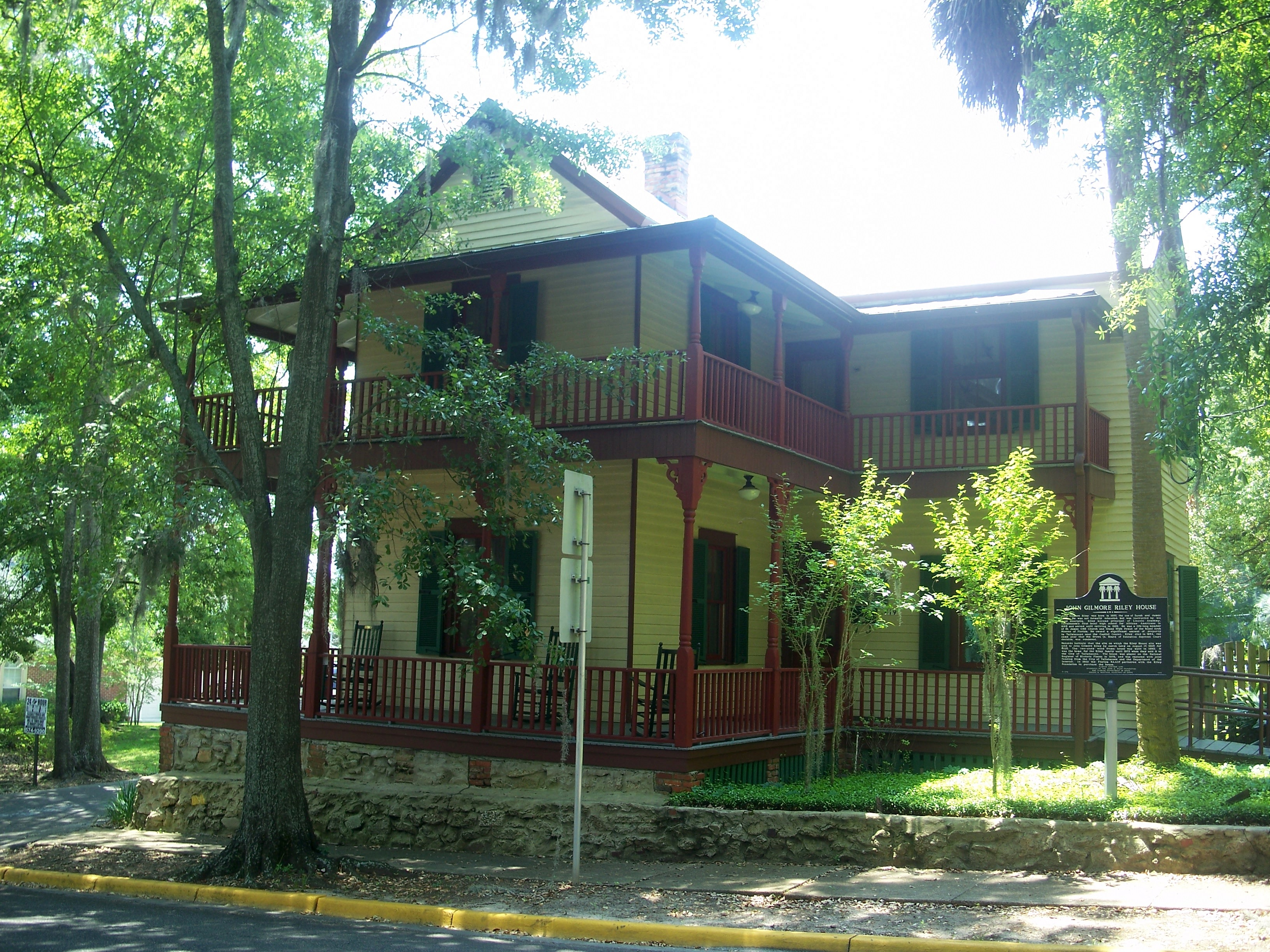

- Location within Florida Location within the United States
- Location: Tallahassee, Florida
- Coordinates: 30°26′21″N 84°16′39″W
- NRHP reference No.: 78000950
- Added to NRHP: August 1, 1978

Built circa 1890, the John Gilmore Riley House is a historic home in Tallahassee, Florida. Located at 419 East Jefferson Street, the house was originally the home of John Gilmore Riley, an African American civic figure, businessman, and educator in Tallahassee during the time period. On August 1, 1978, the house was added to the U.S. National Register of Historic Places for its significance in capturing and sharing the history of African American History, locally, with the Smokey Hollow neighborhood, and throughout the state of Florida. The house has a complex history, and in 1996, it became officially recognized as the John G Riley Center/Museum of African American History and Culture.

== John Gilmore Riley ==
=== Early life ===
Born a slave in Leon County on September 24, 1857, John Gilmore Riley was the son of Sarah and James Riley. According to the National Register of Historic Places inventory, Riley never attended school, but was taught by his Aunt Henrietta ,who had been a school teacher. Riley would proceed to spend the majority of his adult life dedicated to education.

=== Career ===
He began his teaching career in 1877 at a school in Wakulla County. The NRHP states that from the 1880s until 1926, Riley worked for the local Board of Public Instruction. From 1892 to 1926, he was the principal of the Lincoln Academy, which was the first secondary school in Tallahassee open to Black students and one of only three Freedmen schools in the state to offer higher education to formerly enslaved people. This school was later named Lincoln High School.

=== Community ===
John G. Riley was a prominent member of the African-American community in Tallahassee. Along with his career in education, Riley was actively involved in numerous organizations. Riley served on the board of the St. James CME church and as Grand High Priest of the Royal Arch Masons of Florida, a fraternal organization. He also served as the Secretary of the Florida NAACP and was a Member of the Negro Business League.

=== Legacy ===
Riley purchased seven major properties in Tallahassee, on one he built his home and rented several properties to other families. Some of his land ended up being the future sites of the Department of Natural Resources, Bryant Building, and the parking lot of the Florida State University Law School.

John Gilmore Riley died a millionaire at the age of 97. He lived in his house until his death in 1955.

== History ==
Constructed circa 1890, the Riley House is the last physical evidence of a thriving middle-class African-American community that existed in downtown Tallahassee at the turn of the 20th century, known as Smokey Hollow. The house remained in the family until the 1970s.

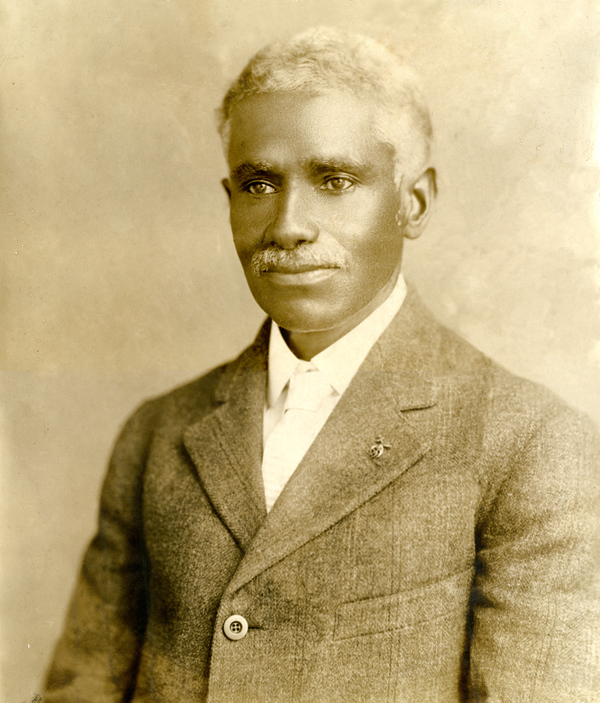
Portrait of John Gilmore Riley - Tallahassee, Florida

More than a historical landmark, the house shows progress and the ability of its owner to succeed despite the odds. Unlike many other historic facilities in Tallahassee, the Riley House has humble beginnings. There was no dramatic transfer by will; neither did it come with a trust account or other means to help sustain operations or address perpetual needs of maintenance and security. According to the NRHP, John G. Riley purchased the land on which the Riley House was built in 1885 for approximately $125.

There was a plan to tear down the Riley House and build an electrical substation on the site; however, the house was saved through the efforts and hard work of local residents and activists. The city bought the house after Riley's family moved out in 1973. With help from the Historic Tallahassee Preservation Board, the site was soon added to the National Register of Historic Places.

The Riley House was restored in 1981, and in 1982, the Florida NAACP partnered with the Riley Foundation to purchase the house. The museum opened in 1996 with Althemese Barnes as the founding director, who retired in 2020. Barnes is responsible for creating the group that developed the commemorative shotgun homes of Smokey Hollow in Cascades Park, across the street from the museum. Barnes also interviewed and recorded hundreds of interviews with former residents of Smokey Hollow.

== Architecture ==
The John Gilmore Riley House is a two-story vernacular wood-framed building. During the 20th-century restoration of the house, several additions were made, including a two-story extension at the back of the building, to ensure the building's preservation while ensuring it could function properly as a museum. The structure was stabilized, deteriorated materials were replaced, and electrical systems were added.

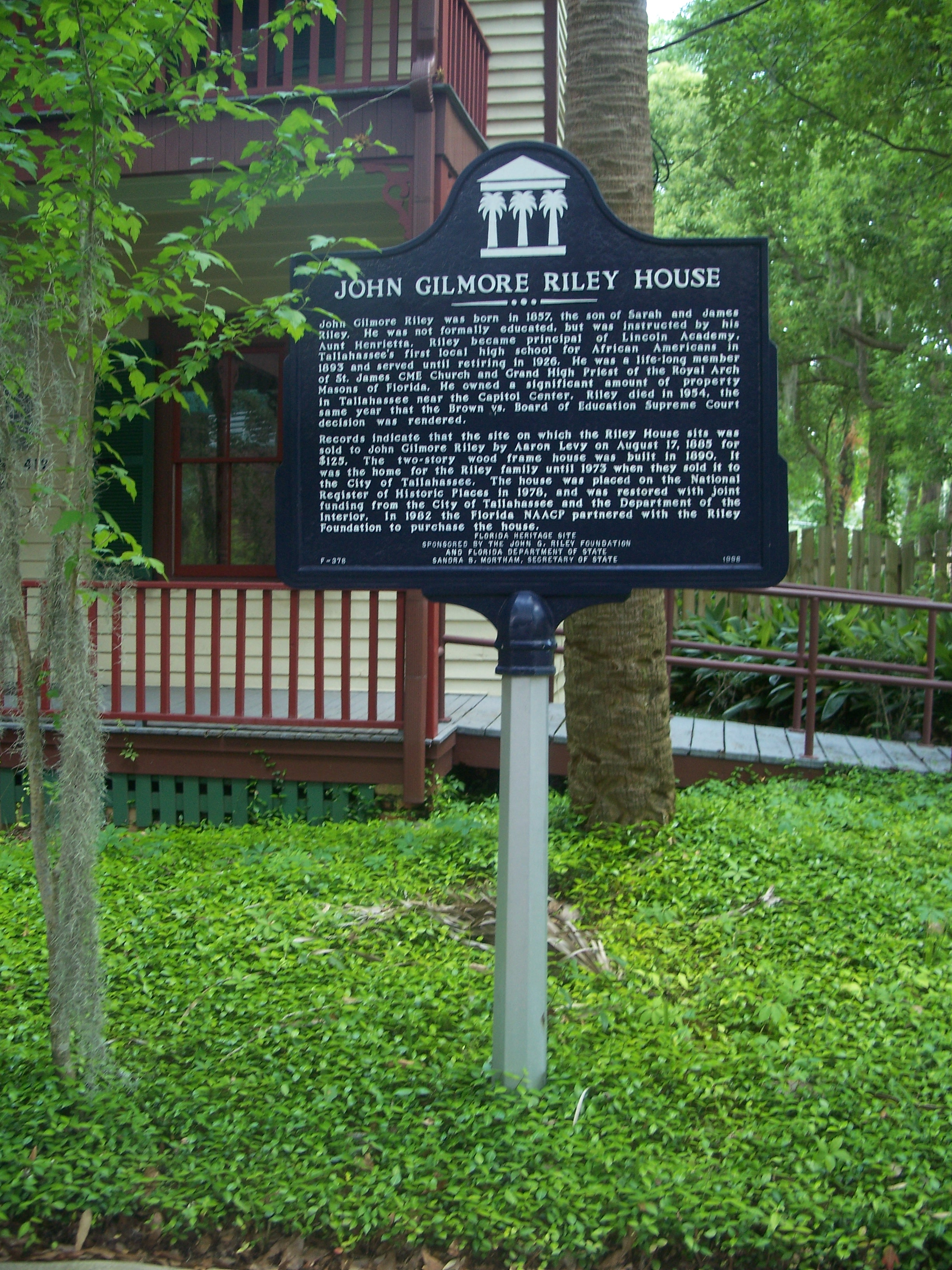
Historical marker

== Museum: collections and programs ==
The John G Riley Center and Museum of African American History and Culture was reopened in the 1990s. The Museum is now known for sharing and preserving the history of John G. Riley, Smokey Hollow, and African American heritage in Florida.

=== Collections ===
The Riley Museum houses an extensive collection of materials and archival culture that documents African American life. The Riley Archives contain manuscripts, maps, rare documents, photographs, and more. The house also has artifacts from the Riley family themselves and the community.

=== Programs and partnerships ===
Florida State University and Tallahassee State College have a partnership with the museum for internships, projects, research, and public programs. TSC even houses the physical Riley House archives.

The Riley Museum oversees the Smokey Hollow Commemorative Park Project, which aims to honor the historic neighborhood through public art, the reconstruction of old structures, and other initiatives.

=== Notable exhibits ===
The museum features an animatronic, speaking figure of Riley, donated by Disney.

In 2021, the museum received a grant from the Institute of Museum and Library Services to digitize "the voluminous archive at FSU and TCC's Riley Museum Archives of photos, documents, rare books, oral histories, and artifacts that document the history of Black Floridians in Leon and Gadsden counties."

== Present ==
The museum is open to the public Tuesday through Thursday and offers guided tours, which include a tour of the Smokey Hollow Commemorative Park. These tours focus on taking visitors through Riley's life and the history of African Americans in Tallahassee.
