= Rollins House =

Historic house in Florida, United States

- U.S. National Register of Historic Places
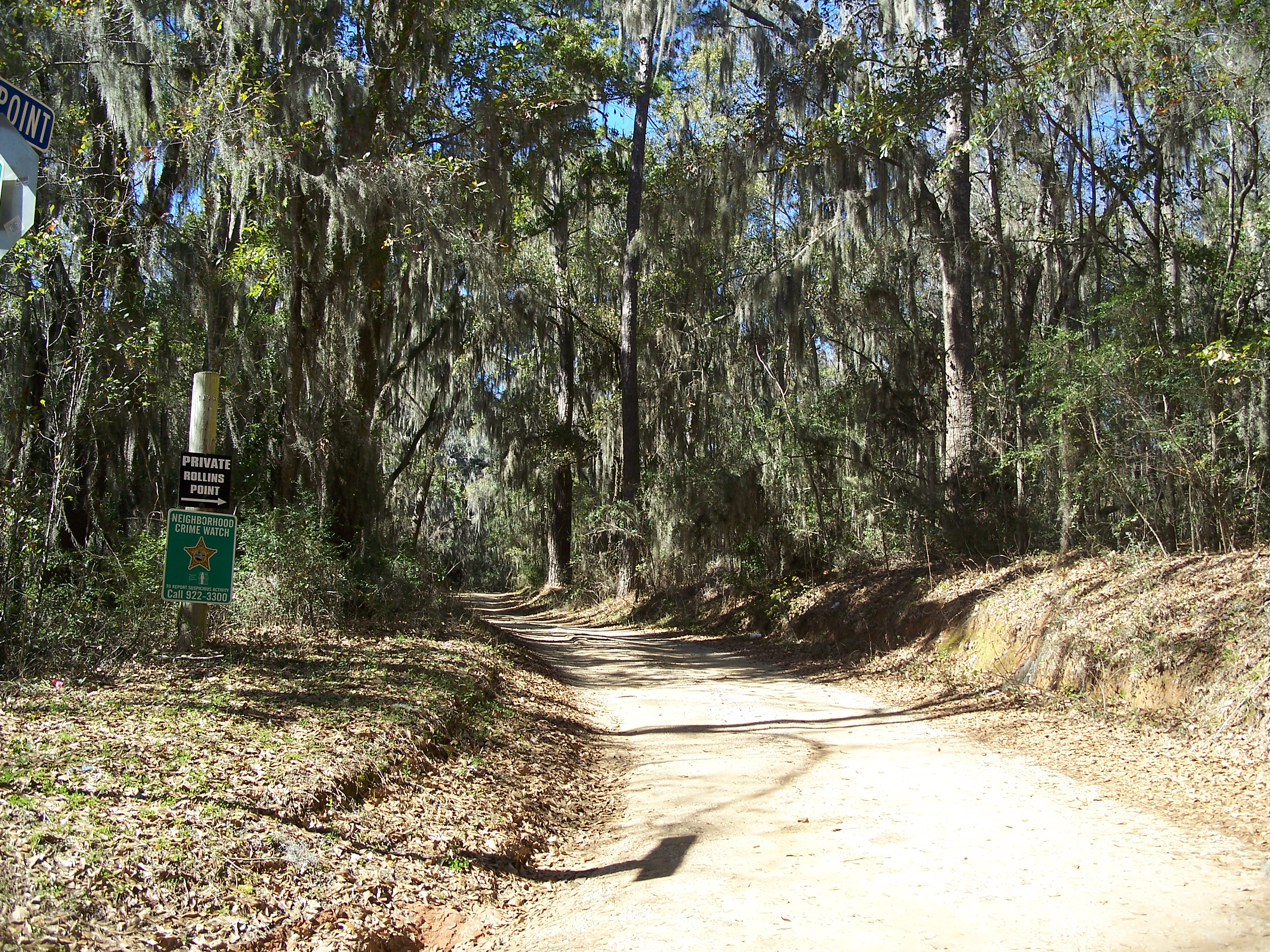

- Location within Florida Location within the United States
- Location: Tallahassee, Florida
- Coordinates: 30°32′35″N 84°19′41″W
- Area: less than one acre
- Built: 1870
- Architect: Charles Rollins
- Architectural style: Frame Vernacular
- NRHP reference No.: 01001415
- Added to NRHP: December 31, 2001

The Rollins House is a historic home in Tallahassee, Florida. It is located at 5456 Rollins Pointe. On December 31, 2001, it was added to the U.S. National Register of Historic Places.
