= Charles Billingsley (cricketer) =

Irish cricketer

Cricket information
- Batting: Right-handed
- Bowling: Right-arm fast-medium

International information
- National side: Ireland

Career statistics
Competition	First-class
Matches	5
Runs scored	19
Batting average	3.80
100s/50s	0/0
Top score	6*
Balls bowled	663
Wickets	18
Bowling average	14.72
5 wickets in innings	0
10 wickets in match	0
Best bowling	4/19
Catches/stumpings	1/–
- Source: CricketArchive, 6 December 2022

Charles William Billingsley (1 January 1910 – 4 November 1951) was an Irish cricketer. A right-handed batsman and right-arm fast-medium bowler, he made his debut for Ireland against the MCC at Lord's in August 1935, taking 5/54 when bowling in the MCC second innings, which were to remain his best bowling figures for Ireland.

He went on to play for Ireland on 13 occasions, his last match coming against Sir Julien Cahn's XI in August 1939. Five of his matches had first-class status.
