= Smoky Hollow Historic District =

Historic district in Florida, United States

- Smokey Hollow Historic District
- U.S. National Register of Historic Places
- U.S. Historic district
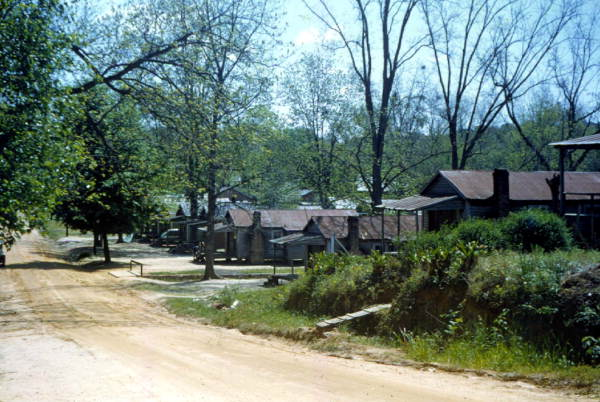

- Location within Florida Location within the United States
- Location: Tallahassee, Florida
- Coordinates: 30°26′11″N 84°16′19″W
- Area: 24 acres (97,000 m^{2})
- Built: c. 1906-1944
- Architectural style: Frame Vernacular, shotgun, and double-shotgun house forms
- NRHP reference No.: 00001199
- Added to NRHP: October 27, 2000; January 14, 2009 (decrease)

The Smokey Hollow Historic District is a U.S. historic district (designated as such on October 27, 2000) located in Tallahassee, Florida. It was one of the first black neighborhoods in the state's capital city, spanning 85 acres before its destruction, and presently containing 14 historic buildings and 3 structures The district is bounded by East Lafayette Street, CSX RR tracks, Myers Park and Myers Park Lane. It contains 14 historic buildings and 3 structures.

== History ==
Named after the area's notably hazy atmosphere, the neighborhood of Smokey Hollow was originally a predominantly African-American community of Tallahassee due to Jim Crow Era practices of racial segregation, containing an array of black owned business and residential properties. It was an active community from the post-Civil War era up until the 1960s, when both the Apalachee Parkway and the State of Florida's Department of Transportation (FDOT) building were constructed and ultimately displaced the community. This urban planning concept was described at the time as an act of 'urban renewal' and was put forth by Taylor Albert Davis in a suggestive proposal for the land surrounding Florida's capital city.

== Architecture ==
A prominent feature of the neighborhood were the residential buildings, known as shotgun houses, which are most common in New Orleans, Louisiana. They were named as such because of their narrow yet open-planned structural design, allowing someone from one side of the house to shoot a gun clear through to the other side of the house.

== Memorial ==
The Smokey Hollow memorial, which commenced planning in the year 2000 by Dan Donovan (a city planner from Blueprint Intergovernmental Agency), comprises 15 acres of land and is constituted of three 'spirit houses' and a memorial barbershop museum. The spirit houses, located in Cascades Park on 501-599 E Pensacola Street, are made up of large metal beams to replicate the structures of the Smokey Hollow shotgun houses. The homes are named "community spirit," "family spirit," and "enduring spirit," respectively, to permanently memorialize the resilience of the dispersed community.

On January 14, 2009, a decrease in the district's boundary was implemented.

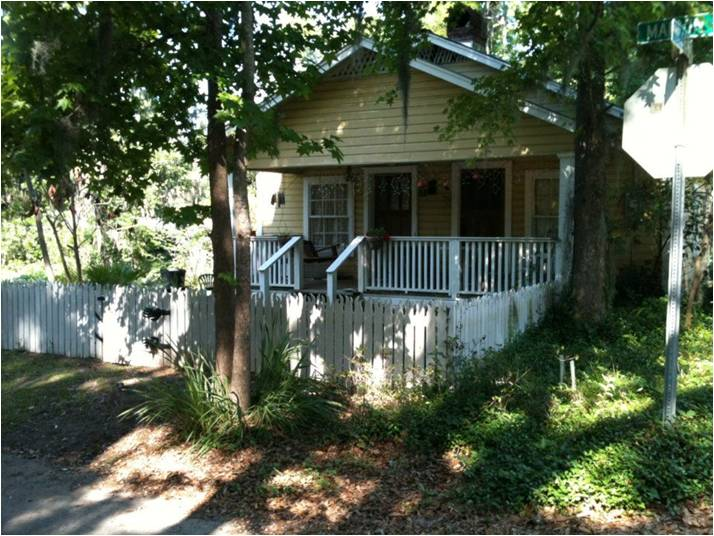
House on Marvin St. built in 1948.
