= Sollner-Wall House =

- U.S. National Register of Historic Places
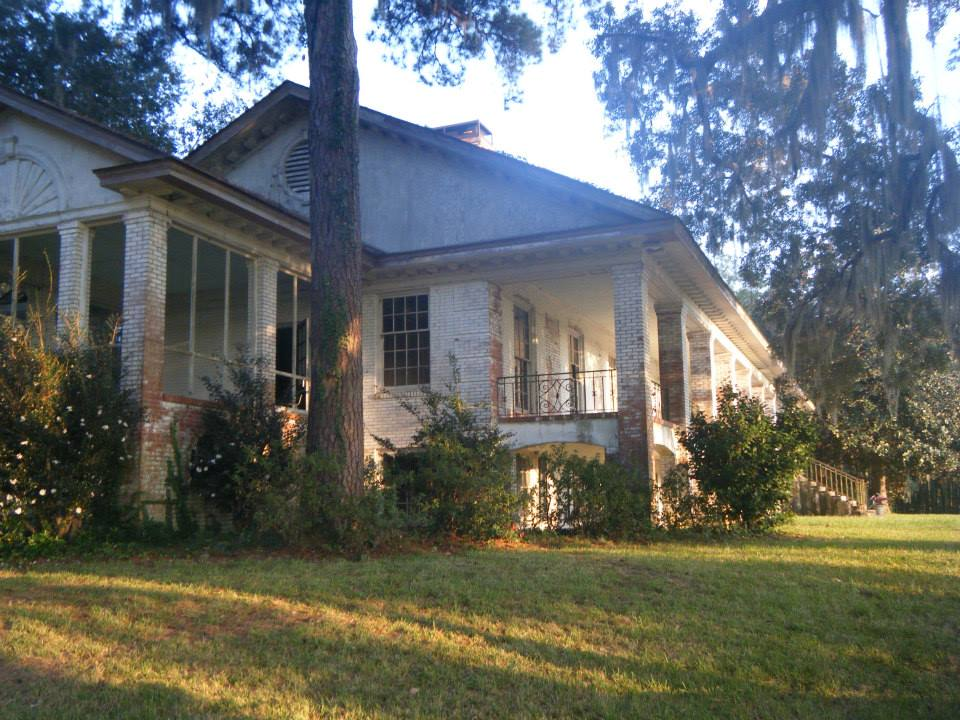

- Location within Florida Location within the United States
- Location: Tallahassee, Florida
- Coordinates: 30°28′27″N 84°07′33″W
- NRHP reference No.: 12000839
- Added to NRHP: October 9, 2012

Sollner-Wall House is a national historic site located at 1759 Chaires Cross Road, Tallahassee, Florida in Leon County.

It was added to the National Register of Historic Places on October 9, 2012.
