= Thomas Perkins =

Thomas Perkins may refer to:

- Thomas Perkins (businessman) (1932–2016), American venture capitalist
- Thomas Perkins (cricketer) (1870–1946), English cricketer and footballer
- Thomas Perkins (politician) (1931–2024), American politician from Maine
- Thomas Clap Perkins (1798–1870), American lawyer and politician from Connecticut
- Thomas Handasyd Perkins (1764–1854), American businessman and philanthropist
- Thomas James Perkins, intendant mayor of Tallahassee, Florida
- Thomas Luff Perkins (1867–1940), British architect, engineer and colonial administrator
- Thomas Nelson Perkins (1870–1937), American lawyer from Massachusetts
- Thomas Philip Perkins (1904–1978), English golfer
- Thomas Wayne Perkins (1940–1971), American singer better known as Thomas Wayne
