= Jack McLean (mayor) =

American politician

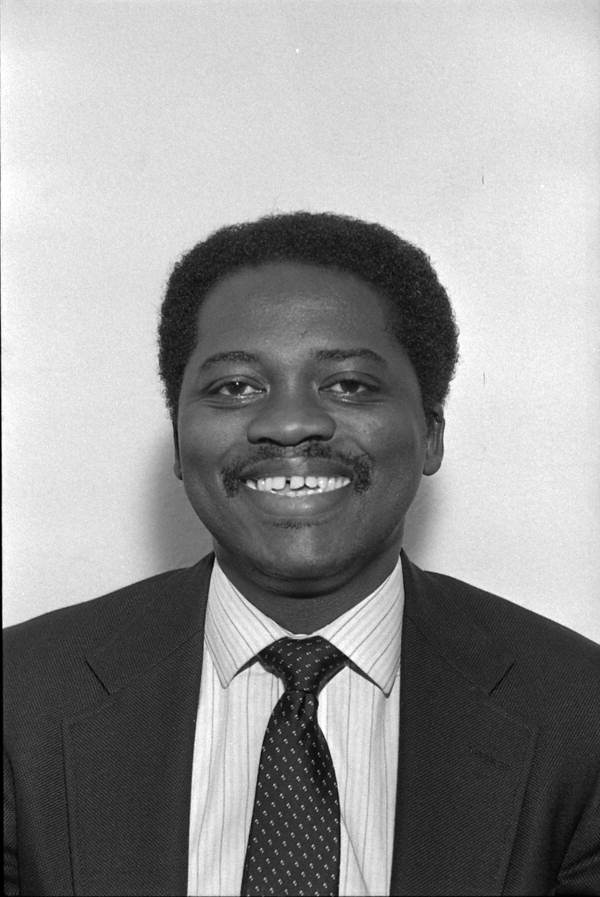
- Photograph of Jack McLean taken May 21, 1985

City Manager of Quincy, Florida
- Incumbent
- Assumed office 2019

City Manager of Quincy, Florida
- In office 2009–2014

City Commissioner of Tallahassee City Council
- Incumbent
- Assumed office 1987

Mayor of Tallahassee
- In office 1986–1986
- Preceded by: Hurley W. Rudd
- Succeeded by: Betty Harley

City Commissioner of Tallahassee City Council
- In office 1984–1986

Personal details
- Born: 1949 or 1950 (age 76–77)
- Education: B.A. University of North Carolina at Chapel Hill; J.D. Florida State University

Jack L. McLean Jr. (born 1949/1950) is an American politician who served as the second African-American mayor since Reconstruction of Tallahassee, the state capitol of Florida. He currently serves as city manager of Quincy, Florida.

== Biography ==
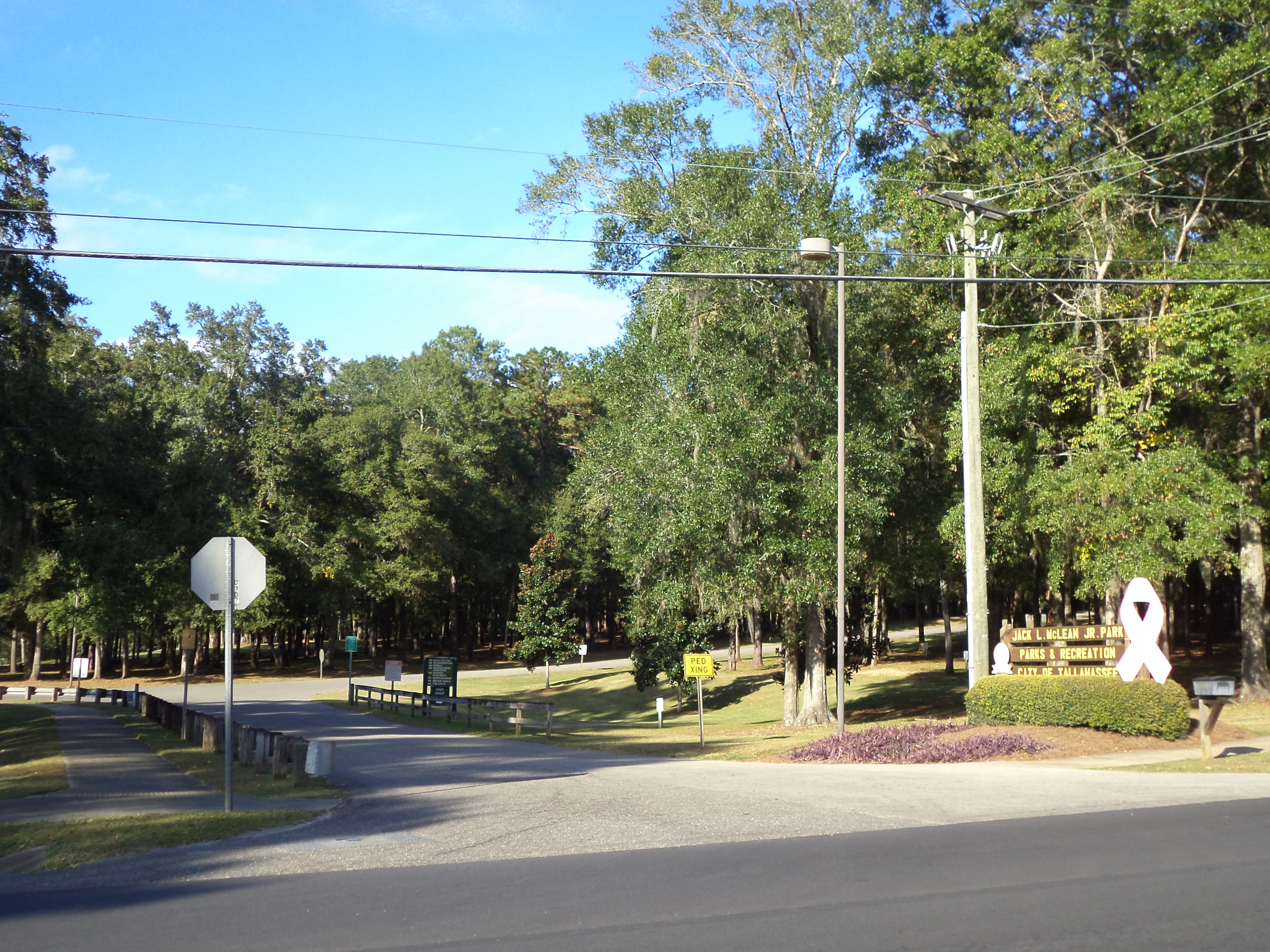
Jack L McLean Jr Park in Tallahassee

Mclean graduated with a B.A. in African Studies from the University of North Carolina at Chapel Hill and received a J.D. from Florida State University. He served as the chairman of Florida Public Employees Relations Commission, the Florida Human Relations Commission, and as executive director of Legal Aid of North Florida.

In 1982, he ran to serve the remaining two years of the term of City Commissioner Shad Hilaman who had died in office. On February 23, 1982, he was defeated for a seat on the City Commission by a white candidate, Judd Chapman, after his 116-vote lead was overcome by absentee ballots. It was alleged that the City Treasurer-Clerk, Herb Seckel, unethically solicited additional ballots to ensure Chapman's victory. McLean filed a lawsuit against Seckel for “gross negligence” with evidence that Seckel delivered absentee ballots to numerous residents who had not requested them which was forbidden under state law. The Courts ruled that no local laws were broken and let Chapman's election stand. The public outrage over the treatment of a Black candidate (Tallahassee which was 1/3rd Black, had previously only elected a single African-American government official since Reconstruction, James R. Ford, who was elected as a City Commissioner in 1971 and mayor in 1972) led to the resignation of Seckel in April and the transfer of election supervision to the Leon County Supervisor of Elections in June 1982. McLean choose not to contest the results and in 1984, he was elected as City Commissioner with 65% of the vote after Chapman choose not to run for reelection defeating a conservative Black candidate who had the support of the business community. The election ensured that a Black would be elected to the position as Tallahassee elected its commissioners on an at-large basis. It also ensured that Tallahassee would have a second Black mayor as City Commissioners rotated into the position with McLean's term coming in 1986, the second African-American mayor in Tallahassee's history. (Tallahassee switched to the direct election of its mayors in 1997). In 2009, McLean served as City Manager in Quincy, Florida in neighboring Gadsden County until he was fired by a 3–2 vote by the City Commission in 2014. He sued the city for his pension and later settled out of court. He returned to private practice of law until in 2018, he was rehired by the city of Quincy as interim City Manager and then City Manager on May 7, 2019.

Other than McLean's public service, he has worked as an attorney with Holland & Knight and McGuireWoods and founded his own law firm, Mack and McLean, which later merged with McGuireWoods. His practice concentrated on government service, employment law, and labor law.
