= 2003 Tallahassee mayoral special election =

- February 4 and February 25, 2003
- Turnout: 32.43% (first round); 33.93% (runoff)
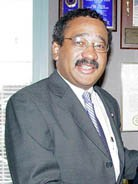

Nominee	John Marks	John Paul Bailey	Steve Meisburg
Party	Nonpartisan	Nonpartisan	Nonpartisan
First-round vote	11,702	7,382	7,039
First-round percentage	43.10%	29.02%	25.93%
Second-round vote	19,119	9,374
Second-round percentage	67.10%	32.90%
Mayor before election
Scott Maddox
Democratic Party
Elected mayor
John Marks
Democratic Party

The 2003 Tallahassee mayoral special election was held February 4 and February 25, 2003 to elect the mayor of Tallahassee, Florida.

Since no candidate obtained a majority of the vote in the first-round, a runoff was held between the top-two finishers.

The election coincided with elections to City Commissioner Seats 1, 2, 3 and 5.

Marks became the second popularly elected mayor of Tallahassee. Marks became Tallahassee's first elected African American mayor, and its fifth-overall African American mayor.

== Background ==
On January 4, 2003, Tallahassee Mayor Scott Maddox was elected Chairman of the Florida Democratic Party. Maddox announced that he would remain Mayor of Tallahassee until late February 2003, when a special mayor election would be held to elect a successor.

== Election results ==
=== First round ===
First-round results
Candidate	Votes	%
John Marks	11,702	43.10
John Paul Bailey	7,382	27.19
Steve Meisburg	7,039	25.93
Anthony "Tony" Davis	603	2.22
Richard Junnier	423	1.56
Total votes	27,149	
Turnout	{{{votes}}}	32.43%

=== Runoff ===
Runoff results
Candidate	Votes	%
John Marks	19,119	67.10
John Paul Bailey	9,374	32.90
Total votes	28,493	
Turnout	{{{votes}}}	33.93%
