= 2022 Tallahassee mayoral election =

- August 23, 2022 (first round); November 8, 2022 (second round)
- Turnout: 30.04% ▼2.72 pp (first round)
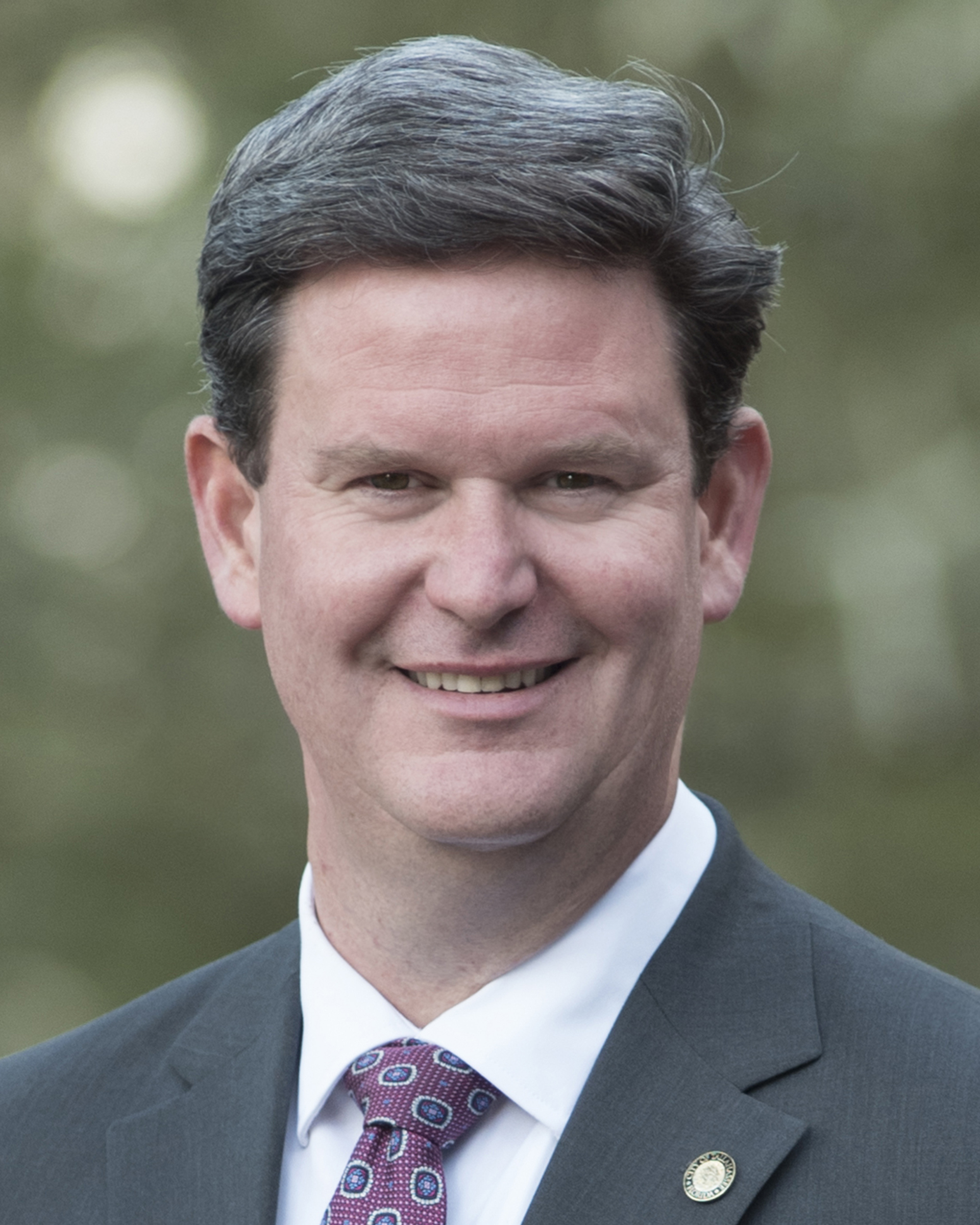

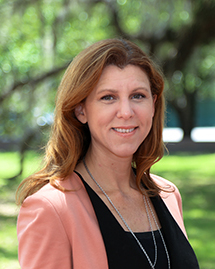

| Candidate | John Dailey | Kristin Dozier | Michael Ibrahim |
| Party | Nonpartisan | Nonpartisan | Nonpartisan |
| First round | 17,449; 45.68% | 17,602; 46.08% | 2,007; 5.25% |
| Runoff | 34,101; 53.16% | 30,044; 46.84% | Eliminated |
- Runoff results by precinct Dailey: 50–60% 60–70% 70-80% Dozier: 50–60% 60–70% 70-80% No votes
Mayor before election
John Dailey
Elected mayor
John Dailey

The 2022 Tallahassee mayoral election was held on Tuesday, November 8, 2022, to elect the Mayor of Tallahassee, Florida. The vote was held subsequently along with the other statewide elections.

As of April 2022, four candidates had filed to run for the mayoral seat including. The candidates were Kristin Dozier, Leon County Commissioner, incumbent Tallahassee mayor John E. Dailey seeking a second term, Whitfield Leland III and Michael Ibrahim.

A first-round primary took place on August 23, 2022, where no candidate received the majority of the vote, thus sparking a second-round runoff between Dailey and Dozier who both garnered most of votes in the August primary to become the main frontrunners in the runoff vote.

Dailey won re-election for a second term.

== Background ==
Following the 2018 mayoral elections, Leon County Commissioner John E. Dailey was elected for the City Commission Seat 4, Mayor post.

== Electoral system ==
All Tallahassee city commissioners, which include the Mayor of Tallahassee, Florida at Seat 4 are elected non-partisan for a four-year term through two-round system. If a candidate winning the most votes at the first round fails to garner enough to have a majority of 50% of the vote share, then a runoff election is held between two candidates who earned the most votes out of all other contestants in the first-round primary.

== Candidates ==
In order to appear on the ballot, candidates were required to file needed papers to the Leon County Supervisor of Elections with a contribution fee of $1,000 per Florida Statute or collect enough petition signatures (1% of registered constituent electorate) as an alternative, with a noon, May 16, 2022, deadline. The qualifying process took place at the Supervisor of Elections Office between noon June 13 and June 17, 2022.

=== Declared ===
| Candidate | | Announced |
|---|---|---|
| John E. Dailey | Incumbent Mayor of Tallahassee since 2018; Leon County Board of Commissioners, District 3 (2006–2018) | March 1, 2021 (Website) |
| Kristin Dozier | Leon County Board of Commissioners, District 5 (2010–present) | March 3, 2022 (Website) |
| Whitfield Leland III | Entrepreneur; Owner of The Community Roundtable of Tallahassee 850 (2020–present) | February 22, 2021 (Website) |
| Michael Ibrahim | Owner of Tallahassee Tireport, Inc (2015–present); Police Officer and Detective in the Ministry of Interior under the Egyptian National Police (1981–2006) | April 4, 2022 |

== Endorsements ==
John Dailey
- Big Bend Police Benevolent Association
- Grow Tallahassee
Kristin Dozier
- Big Bend Chapter AFL CIO
- Climate Cabinet Action
- Democratic Environmental Caucus of Leon County
- Florida Rising
- The Florida Squeeze
- Tallahassee Professional Firefighters

== Polling ==
| Poll source | Date(s) administered | Sample size | John E. Dailey | Kristin Dozier | Michael Ibrahim | Whitfield Leland III | Undecided |
|---|---|---|---|---|---|---|---|
| Network of Entrepreneurs & Business Advocates | May 24, 2022 | 170 | 65.5% | 21% | 13% | 1% | — |

== Debates & candidate forums ==
First round

| No. | Date | Host | Moderator | Link | Nonpartisan | Nonpartisan | Nonpartisan | Nonpartisan |
| Key: P Participant A Absent N Not invited I Invited W Withdrawn | | | | | | | | |
| Key: P Participant A Absent N Not invited I Invited W Withdrawn | | | | | John E. Dailey | Kristin Dozier | Michael Ibrahim | Witfield Leland III |
|---|---|---|---|---|---|---|---|---|
| 1 | May 24, 2022 | Network of Entrepreneurs and Business Advocates | | YouTube | P | P | P | P |
| 2 | Jun. 2, 2022 | | Mutaqee Akbar | YouTube | P | P | P | P |
| 3 | | League of Women Voters of Tallahassee; Tallahassee Democrat; WFSU-TV | Tom Flanigan; William Hatfield; Danielle Irwin | YouTube | P | P | P | P |

Runoff

| No. | Date | Host | Moderator | Link | Nonpartisan | Nonpartisan |
| Key: P Participant A Absent N Not invited I Invited W Withdrawn | | | | | | |
| Key: P Participant A Absent N Not invited I Invited W Withdrawn | | | | | John E. Dailey | Kristin Dozier |
|---|---|---|---|---|---|---|
| 1 | Sep. 16, 2022 | Capital Tiger Bay Club | Gary Fineout | | P | P |
| 2 | Oct. 19, 2022 | League of Women Voters of Tallahassee; Tallahassee Democrat; WFSU-TV | Tom Flanigan; William Hatfield; Danielle Irwin | YouTube | P | P |

== Results ==
=== First round ===
2022 Tallahassee mayoral primary election
| Candidate | Votes | % |
|---|---|---|
| Kristin Dozier | 17,602 | 46.08 |
| John E. Dailey | 17,449 | 45.68 |
| Whitfield Leland III | 2,007 | 5.25 |
| Michael Ibrahim | 1,138 | 2.98 |
| Total votes | 38,196 | 100.00 |
| Turnout | 38,196 | 30.04% |

=== Runoff ===
2022 Tallahassee mayoral runoff election
| Candidate | Votes | % |
|---|---|---|
| John E. Dailey | 34,492 | 53.07% |
| Kristin Dozier | 30,499 | 46.93% |
| Total votes | 64,991 | 100.00 |
| Turnout | | % |
