= 2026 Tallahassee mayoral election =

Local election in Florida, US

- August 18, 2026 (first round); November 3, 2026 (runoff)
- Turnout: 22.64% (first round)
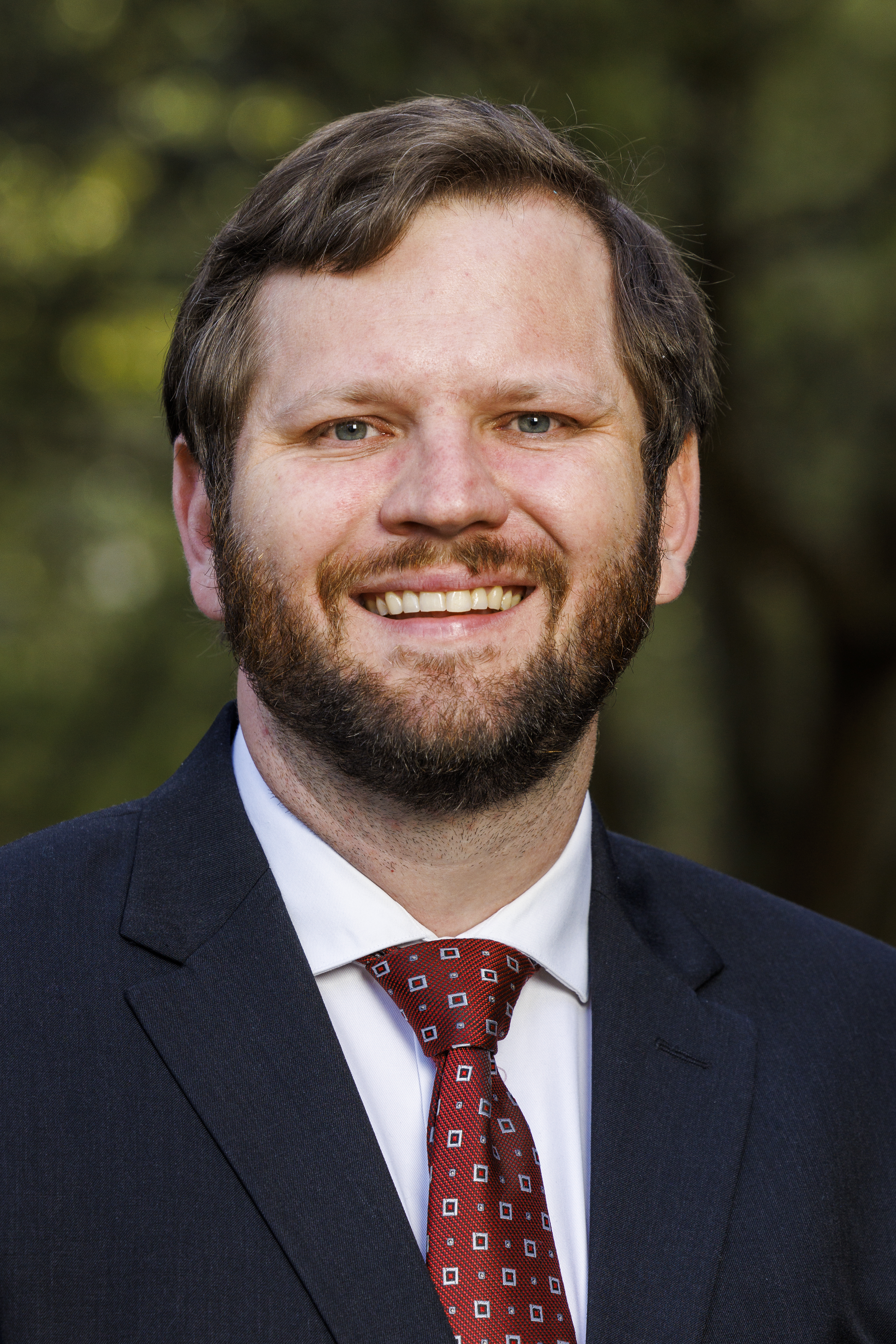

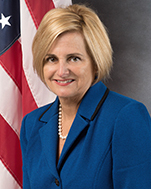

| Candidate | Jeremy Matlow | Loranne Ausley | Daryl Parks |
| First round | 14,908; 36.02% | 13,971; 33.76% | 10,466; 25.29% |
| Runoff | 37,063; 50.94% | 35,698; 49.06% | Eliminated |
Mayor before election
John E. Dailey
Democratic
Elected mayor
Jeremy Matlow
Democratic

The 2026 Tallahassee mayoral election took place on August 18, 2026, to elect the mayor of Tallahassee, Florida. Incumbent mayor John E. Dailey, who was first elected in 2018, announced he would not seek re-election. As no candidate received a majority of the vote, a runoff election took place November 3. City Commissioner Jeremy Matlow defeated former state senator Loranne Ausley in the runoff.

== First round ==
=== Candidates ===
==== Declared ====
- Loranne Ausley, former state senator from the 3rd district (2020–2022) (Democratic)
- Michael Foust, IT entrepreneur (Republican)
- Jeremy Matlow, city commissioner (Democratic)
- Daryl Parks, attorney and nominee for Florida's 3rd Senate district in 2024 (Democratic)

==== Disqualified ====
- Camron Cooper, state employee

==== Declined ====
- Christian Caban, Leon County commissioner (running for re-election)
- John E. Dailey, incumbent mayor
- Rick Minor, Leon County commissioner (running for re-election)

=== Endorsements ===
Loranne Ausley

Labor unions

- Big Bend Police Benevolent Association
Jeremy Matlow

Labor unions

- Big Bend Labor Council AFL-CIO

=== Forums ===
A candidate forum was held by the Tallahassee African American Local Election Review Team on March 6, 2026. Foust, Matlow and Parks attended, with Ausley unable to do so due to other commitments.

Another candidate forum was held on June 23, 2026. The forum was livestreamed on WFSU and was held by the Tallahassee Democrat, the Capital Region News Collaborative, and the League of Women Voters. All candidates attended.

=== Polling ===
| Poll Source | Date(s) Administered | Sample Size (Note: Key: A – all adults RV – registered voters LV – likely voters V – unclear) | Margin of Error | Loranne Ausley | Michael Foust | Jeremy Matlow | Daryl Parks | Undecided |
|---|---|---|---|---|---|---|---|---|
| St. Pete Polls (Note: Poll sponsored by Florida Politics) | July 19–20, 2026 | 345 (LV) | ± 5.3% | 29% | 3% | 24% | 14% | 31% |

=== Results ===
2026 Tallahassee mayoral election (first round)
| Candidate | Votes | % |
|---|---|---|
| Jeremy Matlow | 14,908 | 36.02 |
| Loranne Ausley | 13,971 | 33.76 |
| Daryl D. Parks | 10,466 | 25.29 |
| Michael Shawn Foust | 2,039 | 4.93 |
| Turnout | 41,384 | 22.64% |
| Registered electors | 182,806 | |

== Notes ==
Partisan clients
