= 2014 Tallahassee mayoral election =

- August 26, 2014
- Turnout: 22.91%
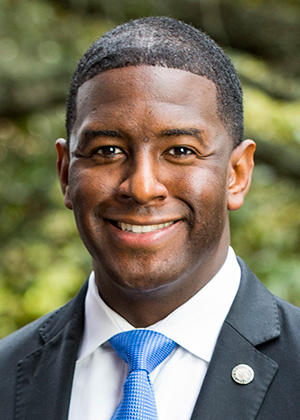

Nominee	Andrew Gillum	Zack Richardson	Larry Hendricks
Party	Nonpartisan	Nonpartisan	Nonpartisan
Popular vote	19,658	3,670	2,642
Percentage	75.69%	14.13%	10.17%
Mayor before election
John Marks
Nonpartisan
Elected mayor
Andrew Gillum
Nonpartisan

The 2014 Tallahassee mayoral election took place on August 26, 2014, in the city of Tallahassee, Florida.

Incumbent Mayor John Marks refused to run a fourth term which resulted in a new seat being open for the candidates. A nonpartisan primary was held between three candidates with Andrew Gillum winning the race by 76 percent.

A run-off election was supposed to be held on November 4 between Gillum and the write-in candidate Evin Matthews. However, Mathews withdrew from the race on August 27, 2014, resulting in Gillum becoming the mayor-elect.

== Election results ==
=== First round ===
2014 Tallahassee mayoral election results
Candidate	Votes	%
Andrew Gillum	19,658	75.69
Zack Richardson	3,670	14.13
Larry Hendricks	2,642	10.17
