= Rocky Comfort Creek =

Rocky Comfort Creek may refer to:

- Rocky Comfort Creek (Florida)
- Rocky Comfort Creek (Georgia)
