= Samuel C. Watkins =

Mayor of Tallahassee, Florida
- In office 1876–1876
- Preceded by: Samuel Walker
- Succeeded by: Jesse Talbot Bernard

Leon County Commission
- In office 1873–1874

Personal details
- Born: circa 1842 Virginia
- Spouse: Mary E. Watkins

Samuel C. Watkins (born circa 1842) was an African American carpenter, politician, and civic leader in post-Civil War Tallahassee, Florida. He is recognized as the first African American to serve as acting mayor of Tallahassee in 1876 (in a brief acting capacity during the Reconstruction era). This occurred when Black political participation in the South was temporarily expanded before the end of Reconstruction led to disenfranchisement through Jim Crow laws.

== Early life and background ==
Samuel C. Watkins was born circa 1842 in Virginia later relocating to Leon County, Florida where he worked as a carpenter, as documented in the 1870 Federal Census. He was married to Mary E. Watkins. In the 1880s, he relocated to Jacksonville, Florida, continuing in the carpentry trade per the 1888 City Directory.

== Political career ==
During Reconstruction, Watkins held multiple public offices in Leon County and Tallahassee. He served as a Leon County Commissioner from March 3, 1873, until September 22, 1874. In 1875, he was elected as the first African American City Council President in Tallahassee.

In 1876, as City Council President, Watkins briefly served as acting mayor under the city's governance rules (where the council president could assume mayoral duties during vacancies or absences). This made him Tallahassee's first African American mayor (in an acting role) and one of the earliest in Florida during Reconstruction. His service is highlighted in local histories as part of broader Reconstruction-era gains for African Americans in Tallahassee, including other firsts like elected council members in 1871.

Watkins' acting mayoral role symbolizes early Black political empowerment in Florida's capital during a transitional period. Official City of Tallahassee and Leon County records, along with historical society publications, commemorate him among African American firsts in local government. The next African American mayor of Tallahassee after Reconstruction was James R. Ford in 1972 (first elected post-Reconstruction), followed by others like Dorothy Inman-Johnson (first Black female commissioner and mayor in the 1980s and 1990s).

== See also ==
- List of first African-American mayors
