= Joan Heggen =

American politician

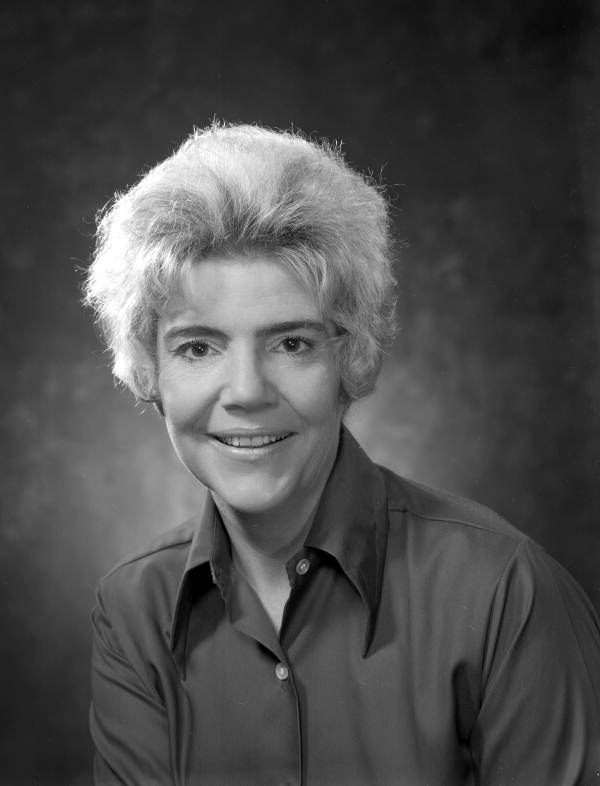

Mayor of Tallahassee
- In office 1973–1973
- Preceded by: James R. Ford
- Succeeded by: Russell R. Bevis

Joan Reidy Heggen was an American politician who served as mayor of Tallahassee, Florida. The first woman to hold the position, Heggen served as mayor from 1973 to 1974. She declined to run for reelection, citing a desire to spend more time with her family. Heggen was born in Wisconsin and graduated from the University of Wisconsin–Eau Claire. She also did graduate work at the University of Alabama.

In addition to her work as mayor, she served as Tallahassee's City Commissioner and was an active member of the National League of Cities. "As a City Commissioner, Joan Heggen was interested in the overall planning to cope with the population explosion in Tallahassee at that time, continually stressing the importance of comprehensive long range planning. She strongly supported the protection of the environment, more affordable housing and lower utility rates. Ms. Heggen initiated the City’s first applications for federal grants. She was active in the National League of Cities and in 1973 was appointed chairperson of a committee, which involved environmental and utility problems facing cities."

Heggen also worked as the Florida Secretary of Community Affairs and as an Assistant County Administrator of Leon County.
