= Samuel Walker (Florida politician) =

American politician (1825–1881)

Mayor of Tallahassee
- In office 1876–1876
- Preceded by: David S. Walker Jr.
- Succeeded by: Samuel C. Watkins

Member of the Florida Legislature
- In office ?-?

Personal details
- Born: June 25, 1825 Londonderry Township, Pennsylvania, U.S.
- Died: June 9, 1881 (aged 55) Downingtown, Pennsylvania, U.S.
- Resting place: Northwood Cemetery
- Party: Republican
- Education: Yale University

Samuel Walker (June 25, 1825 – June 9, 1881) was an American politician from Pennsylvania. He served as mayor of Tallahassee, Florida, in Florida's state legislature, as a Leon County Court judge, and as a U.S. Senator.

== Early life ==
Samuel Walker was born on June 25, 1825, in Londonderry Township, Chester County, Pennsylvania, to Ann (née McNeal) and John Walker. In 1836, the family moved to Downingtown. He graduated from Yale College in 1854. He apprenticed as a wheelwright.

== Career ==
Following graduation, Walker entered the service of the United States Coast Survey. From 1859 to 1866, he was in charge of the Magnetic Observatory at Key West, Florida. Upon completion of a series of magnetic observations, he resigned on May 15, 1866.

Walker then studied law, was admitted to the bar in 1864, and opened a law practice. On June 18, 1866, he was appointed prosecuting attorney in the county criminal court in Key West. In 1867, he relocated to Tallahassee, where he remained for the rest of his life.

Elected as a member of the Florida Legislature and mayor of Tallahassee, he was also later appointed by Florida's governor as judge of the Leon County Court. In 1874, he was selected by Republican members of the Legislature for the position of U.S. Senator.

== Personal life ==
Walker did not marry. During the autumn of 1876, Walker suffered a stroke of paralysis. After retiring, he spent most of his time on a small plantation that he had purchased. In May 1881, he went north to visit his relatives, and spent time in Downingtown. He died at his sister's house in Downingtown on June 9, 1881. He was buried in Northwood Cemetery.
