= John Ward Henderson =

Floridian lawyer and state legislator

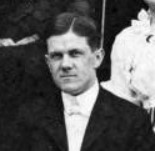

Mayor of Tallahassee
- In office 1905–1905
- Preceded by: William L. Moor
- Succeeded by: Foster Clinton Gilmore

Personal details
- Born: October 28, 1873
- Died: June 17, 1925 (aged 51)
- Parent: John Alexander Henderson (father)

John Ward Henderson (October 28, 1873 – June 17, 1925) was a lawyer and state legislator who also served as mayor of Tallahassee, Florida in 1905. He served as a state senator in 1907 representing Leon County, Florida.

John Alexander Henderson was his father. Alvan S. Harper photographed him while he was a boy in the late 19th century. He studied law at the University of Virginia, graduating in 1896.

He was elected mayor of Tallahassee in 1904. In 1906 he was elected to represent Leon County, Florida in the Florida State Senate. He was photographed in the driver's seat of a Lincoln auto while talking to George Lewis in front of Lewis State Bank.

John Ward Henderson Jr. also served as a legislator in Florida. He and his sister May were photographed as children.

== See also ==
- Mayor of Tallahassee, Florida
