= Ron Weaver (mayor) =

American attorney and politician

Mayor of Tallahassee
- In office 1996 – February 28, 1997
- Preceded by: Scott Maddox
- Succeeded by: Scott Maddox

Member of Tallahassee City Commission
- In office 1994–1998

Ron Weaver is an American attorney and former politician who served as mayor of Tallahassee, Florida.

== Biography ==
Weaver served for 10 years in the U.S. Army and then worked as a personal injury attorney at the firm of Cox & Weaver in Tallahassee. In 1994, running on a pro-business and conservative agenda and amassing a record $80,000 in campaign funds (more than the other six candidates combined), he defeated incumbent City Commissioner and former Mayor Dorothy Inman-Crews in a runoff election for a seat on the Tallahassee City Commission. The campaign drew attention due to controversy surrounding a racial remark made by Inman-Crews's husband. Under Tallahassee's government structure at the time (prior to the 1997 transition to a directly elected mayor), the mayor was selected from among City Commission members and typically was assigned annually. Weaver served as mayor of Tallahassee in 1996.

Weaver is the fifth African American to hold the mayorship in the city's history (and the 4th since the Reconstruction Era). While mayor, he continued to focus on his priorities of streamlining the regulatory and permitting environment and in the construction of affordable housing. His tenure followed Scott Maddox (1995) and preceded Maddox's return. After serving as mayor, he continued to serve as a city commissioner until 1998. In 1996, he was involved in an incident where a city worker activated sprinklers on a city golf course to chase him away as he had started playing before the course had opened. He was accused of abusing his mayoral authority after he had the City Manager sanction the employee.
