= 1997 Tallahassee mayoral election =

- February 4, 1997 (first round); February 25, 1997 (runoff)
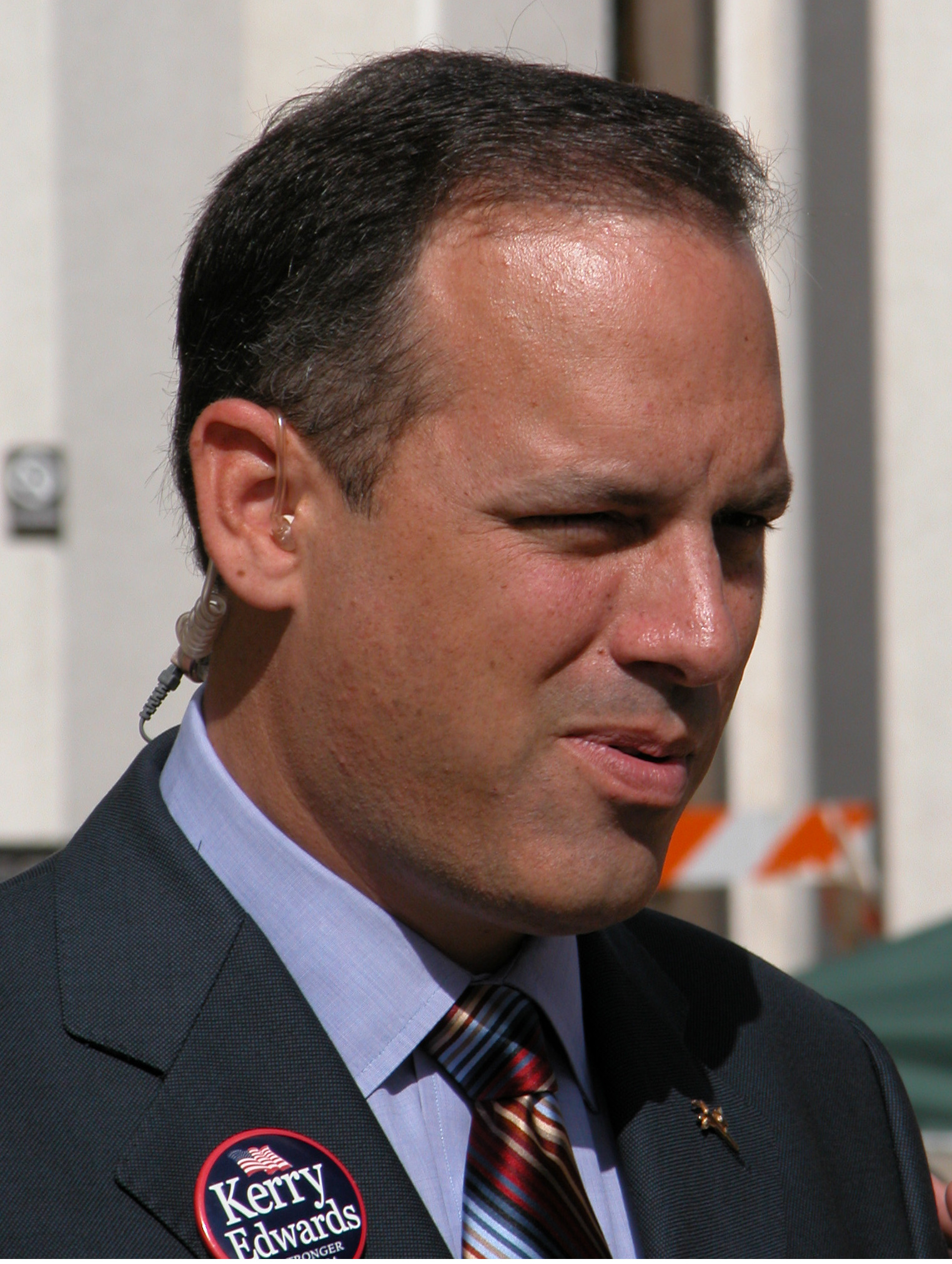

Nominee	Scott Maddox	Charles Billings	Anita L. Davis
Party	Nonpartisan	Nonpartisan	Nonpartisan
First-round vote	10,405	6,258	4,973
First-round percentage	48.07%	38.53%	22.98%
Second-round vote	11,100	10,546
Second-round percentage	51.28%	48.72%
Mayor before election
Scott Maddox
Nonpartisan
Elected mayor
Scott Maddox
Nonpartisan

The 1997 Tallahassee mayoral election was held on February 4 and February 25, 1997, to elect the Mayor of Tallahassee, Florida. It was the first election since 1919 that the post of the mayor was directly elected.

Incumbent mayor Scott Maddox was elected by the City Commission to serve as the mayor of Tallahassee in 1995. Following November 1996 referendum where citizens of Tallahassee approved popular elections for mayors. The first round of voting was held on February 4, 1997, between Maddox, Charles Billings, and Anita L. Davis.

A runoff was held on February 25, 1997, where Maddox gathered over 51% of the vote defeating Billings, thus becoming the direct-mayor elect.

== Results ==
1997 Tallahassee mayoral election (first round)
Party	Candidate	Votes	%	±%
Nonpartisan	Scott Maddox (incumbent)	10,405	48.07	
Nonpartisan	Charles Billings	6,258	38.53	
Nonpartisan	Larry Hendricks	4,973	22.98	

1997 Tallahassee mayoral election (runoff)
Party	Candidate	Votes	%	±%
Nonpartisan	Scott Maddox (incumbent)	11,100	51.28	
Nonpartisan	Charles Billings	10,546	48.72	
