= John E. Dailey =

American politician (born 1972)

John Dailey
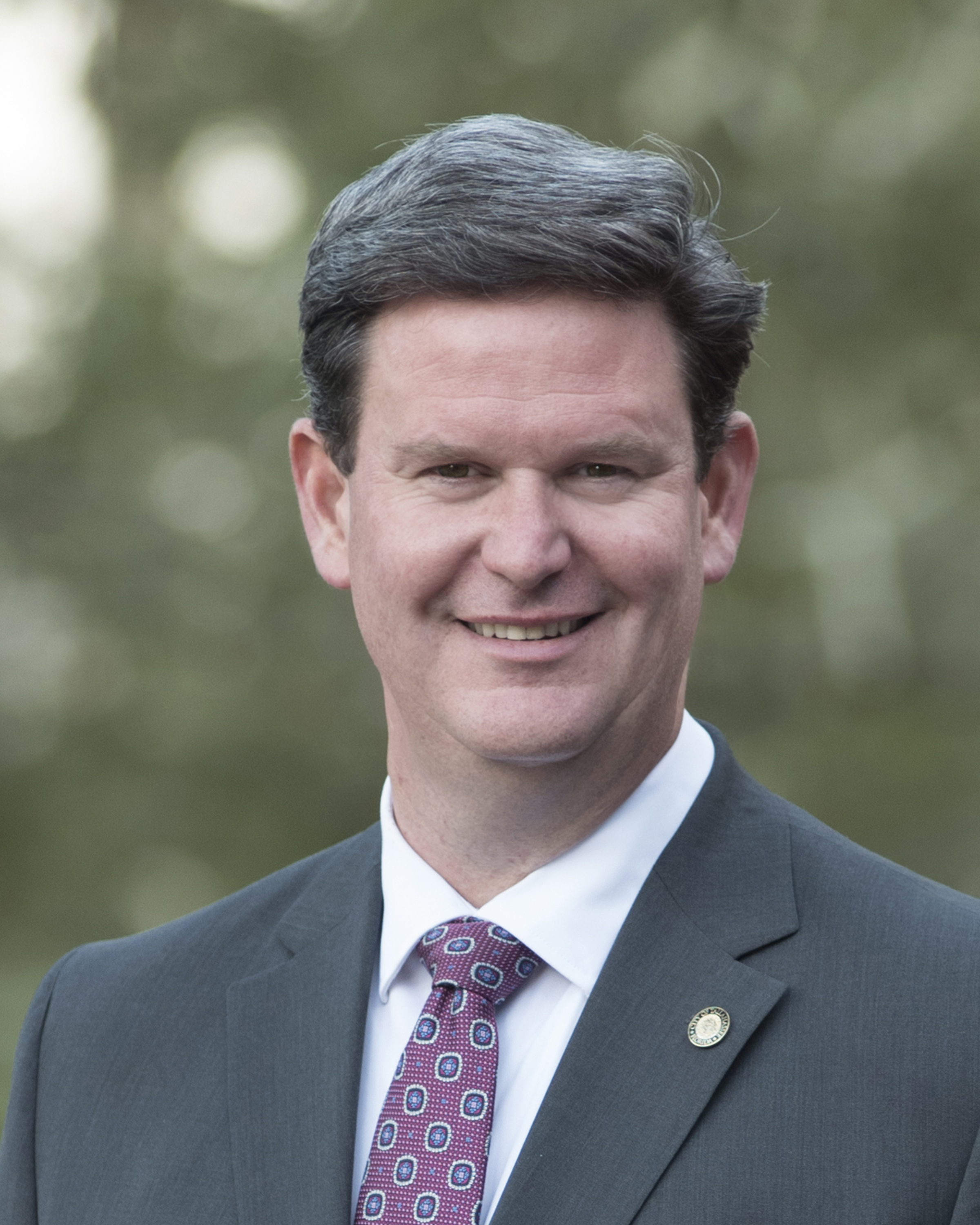
- Dailey in 2018

127th Mayor of Tallahassee
- In office November 19, 2018 – November 16, 2026
- Preceded by: Andrew Gillum
- Succeeded by: Jeremy Matlow

Personal details
- Born: John Evans Dailey; December 7, 1972 (age 53) Miami, Florida, U.S.
- Party: Democratic
- Spouse: Virginia Dailey
- Children: 2
- Education: Florida State University, Tallahassee (BA, MPA); London School of Economics (MA)

John Evans Dailey (born December 7, 1972) is an American politician serving as the 127th mayor of Tallahassee, Florida, since 2018. A member of the Democratic Party, he previously served on the Leon County Commission from 2006 to 2018, representing District 3 and twice serving as its chair.

Born in Miami and raised in Tallahassee, Dailey earned a master’s degree in public administration and began his political career working in state and local government. He was elected mayor in 2018 to succeed Andrew Gillum and won re-election in 2022, defeating Leon County Commissioner Kristin Dozier.

During his tenure as mayor, Dailey has prioritized ethics reform, affordable housing, and public safety. He led the adoption of a sweeping ethics reform package early in his term and supported the expansion of housing initiatives including modular shelters and mixed-income developments. In response to the George Floyd protests, he oversaw the creation of a Citizens Police Review Board (CPRB) and a mental health mobile response unit. The CPRB was later disbanded in 2025 following state legislation restricting civilian oversight.

Dailey also directed Tallahassee's COVID-19 response, launching early remote work protocols, utility and small business relief programs, and local vaccination outreach. He backed major infrastructure improvements, including pedestrian safety and Tallahassee International Airport expansion.

Throughout his mayoralty, Dailey has faced friction with some city commissioners over ethics oversight, lobbying transparency, and budget priorities, with several votes on governance policy dividing the city commission.

== Early life and career ==
Dailey was born in Miami. He earned a Bachelor of Arts degree in political science from Florida State University. During undergrad he was a member of the Sigma Chi fraternity. He earned a Master of Public Administration from the Reubin O'D Askew School of Public Administration and Policy, and a Master of Urban and Regional Planning from the London School of Economics. During his time at LSE, he served as an aide to British politician Roger Casale, a member of Parliament.

== Board of County Commissioners ==
On September 5, 2006, Dailey was elected to the Leon County Board of County Commissioners for the third district. He served on the Leon County Commission for three terms, during which he served as chairman of the board twice (2010–2011 and 2016–2017).

== Mayor of Tallahassee (2018–present) ==
=== Elections ===
==== 2018 ====
Dailey announced his candidacy for mayor of Tallahassee on 30 March 2018, following the decision of then-incumbent Andrew Gillum not to seek re-election. His campaign emphasized ethics reform, restoring trust in city government, and expanding economic opportunities through job training and workforce development programs aimed at young residents.

Dailey led the field in fundraising, reporting over $91,000 in campaign contributions by May 2018, with support from high-profile figures such as former U.S. Representative Gwen Graham. He placed first in the August 28 primary with 39.7% of the vote, advancing to a runoff election against Dustin Daniels. On November 6, 2018, Dailey was elected mayor in the runoff with 51.4% of the vote.

==== 2022 ====
In 2022, Dailey ran for a second term as mayor. He faced a competitive race against Leon County Commissioner Kristin Dozier and two other candidates. During the campaign, Dailey highlighted his progress in enhancing infrastructure, reducing crime, boosting economic growth, and improving public safety. He also defended a controversial $27 million Blueprint allocation to renovate Doak Campbell Stadium, arguing that the funding would generate tourism revenue and economic growth. The campaign became contentious as Dailey filed a complaint with the Florida Elections Commission accusing Dozier of coordinating with unregistered political groups and her campaign being driven by dark money. He also maintained a strong fundraising advantage, collecting over $200,000 in contributions by April 2022, primarily from local business and institutional donors.

Dailey advanced to a runoff election after no candidate received a majority in the August primary. In the November 8, 2022, runoff, he was re-elected with 53.1% of the vote, defeating Dozier by a margin of just over six percentage points.

==== 2026 ====
In August 2025, it was reported that Dailey would not seek a third term as mayor of Tallahassee, confirming earlier speculation that he might retire.

=== Inauguration ===
On November 19, 2018, Dailey succeeded Andrew Gillum as the mayor of Tallahassee after assuming office, where he outlined in writing "a next chapter for the city of Tallahassee."

=== Ethics reform ===
Early in his administration, Dailey prioritized ethics reform to restore public trust in city government. In October 2019, he championed a comprehensive ethics package that banned gifts to officials, strengthened financial disclosure requirements, and authorized fines for violations. These measures were hailed as some of the strongest ethics reforms in Tallahassee's history. Dailey also supported the creation of an Independent Inspector General's Office with whistleblower protections, though he later opposed expanding its jurisdiction to include city commissioners due to legal concerns.

Over time, disagreements developed between Dailey and certain city commissioners regarding transparency and lobbying oversight, with critics accusing Dailey of resisting stronger accountability reforms.

=== COVID-19 response ===
Dailey's administration responded proactively to the COVID-19 pandemic. Even before the city's first confirmed case, over one-third of the municipal workforce shifted to remote work, and safety protocols such as health screenings and PPE distribution were implemented. Dailey suspended utility shutoffs and initiated one of the earliest city-led relief programs, including a 27% reduction in electric bills during May 2020 and $6.3 million in CARES Act-funded utility relief. The city also disbursed more than $2 million in grants to small businesses and nonprofits, supported by over $30 million in federal aid. Additionally, Dailey advocated for early stay-at-home orders, mask mandates, and coordinated vaccine communications, holding public updates with regional health leaders in early 2021.

=== Economic development ===
Dailey's leadership, Tallahassee pursued strategic economic growth initiatives with a focus on enhancing air connectivity. He supported the expansion of Tallahassee International Airport (TLH), which is projected to generate nearly $1 billion in annual economic impact. Following setbacks such as JetBlue's departure from TLH, Dailey and airport officials worked to attract new carriers and stabilize air service. In January 2025, Dailey proposed a $10 million airline incentive program designed to reduce financial risks for airlines through minimum revenue guarantees, in partnership with state agencies aiming to boost passenger volumes.

Dailey partnered with local organizations such as Access Tallahassee to launch a heavy equipment training program aimed at closing workforce gaps in road construction; this program offers three months of training with guaranteed job placement, a first in Florida municipal workforce development. Additionally, Dailey prioritized revitalization efforts in neighborhoods including Bond and Frenchtown, promoting community-driven improvements through collaboration between city agencies and residents.

=== Housing ===
Housing affordability has been a central concern for Dailey. During the 2023 city commission retreat, he encouraged exploring public-private partnerships to share costs for low-income housing infrastructure, challenging the prevailing developer-only financing model. He opposed repurposing Blueprint Intergovernmental Agency funds for housing projects beyond their original voter-approved scope, emphasizing respect for voter mandates despite cross-party support for expansion.

After attending the U.S. Conference of Mayors, Dailey advocated adopting modular "pallet housing" as a rapid sheltering solution for the homeless, drawing on innovative practices from other cities. In May 2025, the Ridge Road Flats, a 250-unit rent-restricted complex for households earning up to 70% of Area Median Income, opened on Tallahassee's south side, developed through collaboration among city, county, and state partners under Dailey's administration.

=== Policing ===
Amid the George Floyd protests, Dailey led the establishment of the Citizens Police Review Board (CPRB) on June 3, 2020, to enhance transparency and community oversight of law enforcement and worked with the Tallahassee Police Department to launch the Tallahassee Bystander mobile app, which allows residents to record and livestream police encounters using voice activation. However, in April 2024, the Florida Legislature passed House Bill 601, which limited the authority of civilian oversight boards by prohibiting them from participating in any aspect of law enforcement misconduct investigations. Although state sponsors later clarified that policy-focused civilian boards could remain, Tallahassee officials interpreted HB 601 as requiring full disbandment of the CPRB, and on January 15, 2025, the Tallahassee City Commission voted 3–2 to repeal its authorizing ordinance with Dailey supporting the repeal of CPRB by citing the law's legal constraints.

The city also launched the Tallahassee Emergency Assessment Mobile Unit (TEAM) in April 2021, a mental health mobile response team that responds to non‑violent 911 calls involving mental health crises.

In March 2021, Dailey opposed the proposed Florida anti-riot legislation that would impose felony charges on demonstrators, calling it an infringement on free speech and local authority.

=== Neighborhood revitalization ===
Dailey supported investments in pedestrian and street safety, including securing a $12 million grant for sidewalk improvements in the Southside neighborhood following advocacy from industry groups and residents. He championed reinvestment in historically significant neighborhoods such as Frenchtown, an African-American community facing development pressures. Efforts were made to strengthen community identity and prevent displacement amid expansions by Florida State University and rising housing demand.

=== Social policies ===
In June 2019, Dailey expanded the city's paid parental leave policy to offer six weeks of paid leave to new parents following birth or adoption.

Dailey proposed making Election Day a paid holiday for Tallahassee city employees to promote voter participation, citing concerns about voter suppression efforts in other states and presenting the initiative as a chance for the city to lead on voting rights; the City Commission approved the measure with a vote on April 7, 2021.

== Electoral history ==
2022 Tallahassee mayoral general election
Party	Candidate	Votes	%
Nonpartisan	John Dailey	34,492	53.07%
Nonpartisan	Kristin Dozier	30,499	46.93%
Total votes		64,991	100.00

2022 Tallahassee mayoral primary election
Party	Candidate	Votes	%
Nonpartisan	Kristin Dozier	17,621	46.08%
Nonpartisan	John Dailey	17,473	45.69%
Nonpartisan	Whitfield "Hubba Bubba" Leland	2,010	5.26%
Nonpartisan	Michael "Mike" Ibrahim	2,010	5.26%
Total votes		38,242	100.00

== Personal life ==
Raised in Tallahassee, Dailey is the son of Sarah Ann Dailey, a schoolteacher, and the late J. Scott Dailey, who was a two-term member of the Leon County School Board.

Dailey lives in Tallahassee, Florida, with his wife, Virginia Dailey. They have two sons named Tommy (14) and Henry (12).

== See also ==
- Mayor of Tallahassee

Political offices
Preceded by Andrew Gillum	Mayor of Tallahassee; 2018–2026	Succeeded by Jeremy Matlow
