= Meredith Bordeaux =

American politician

Meredith (Bud) Bordeaux

Member of the Maine House of Representatives from the 43rd district
- In office January 3, 1979 – December 1, 1982
- Preceded by: Thomas Perkins
- Succeeded by: Stephen M. Zirnkilton

Personal details
- Born: October 4, 1912 Hancock, Maine, U.S.
- Died: March 25, 2014 (aged 101) Hancock, Maine, U.S.
- Party: Republican
- Occupation: Farmer

Meredith Ernest "Bud" Bordeaux (October 4, 1912 – March 25, 2014) was an American politician in the state of Maine.

Bordeaux served in the Maine House of Representatives from 1979 to 1982, as a Republican. He lived in Mount Desert, Maine, and turned 100 in 2012. Bordeaux died in March 2014 at the age of 101. He was predeceased by his wife, Grace Butler, who died in 2011.
