= Dexter Marvin Lowry =

Floridian lawyer and state legislator

Mayor of Tallahassee
- In office 1910–1917
- Preceded by: Francis B. Winthrop
- Succeeded by: J. R. McDaniel

Personal details
- Born: 1876; Valleyhead, Alabama
- Died: 1936

Dexter Marvin Lowry (1876–1936) was an American politician who served as mayor of Tallahassee and as a senator in the legislature of Florida.

Lowry was born in 1876 in Valleyhead, Alabama and moved to Tallahassee in 1900 to work as the general manager of the Florida Cotton Oil Company. In 1904, he was elected to the city commission. In 1910, he was elected mayor. He served an additional seven consecutive terms as mayor through 1917. In 1918, he was elected to the Florida State Senate from the 8th district, where he served two terms. In 1920, he served as president and owner of Capital City Bank.

Ensley died in 1936. His younger brother, Fred Lowry (1909–1985), served on the Tallahassee city commission (1946–1948) and as mayor in 1948.
