= Scott Maddox =

American politician

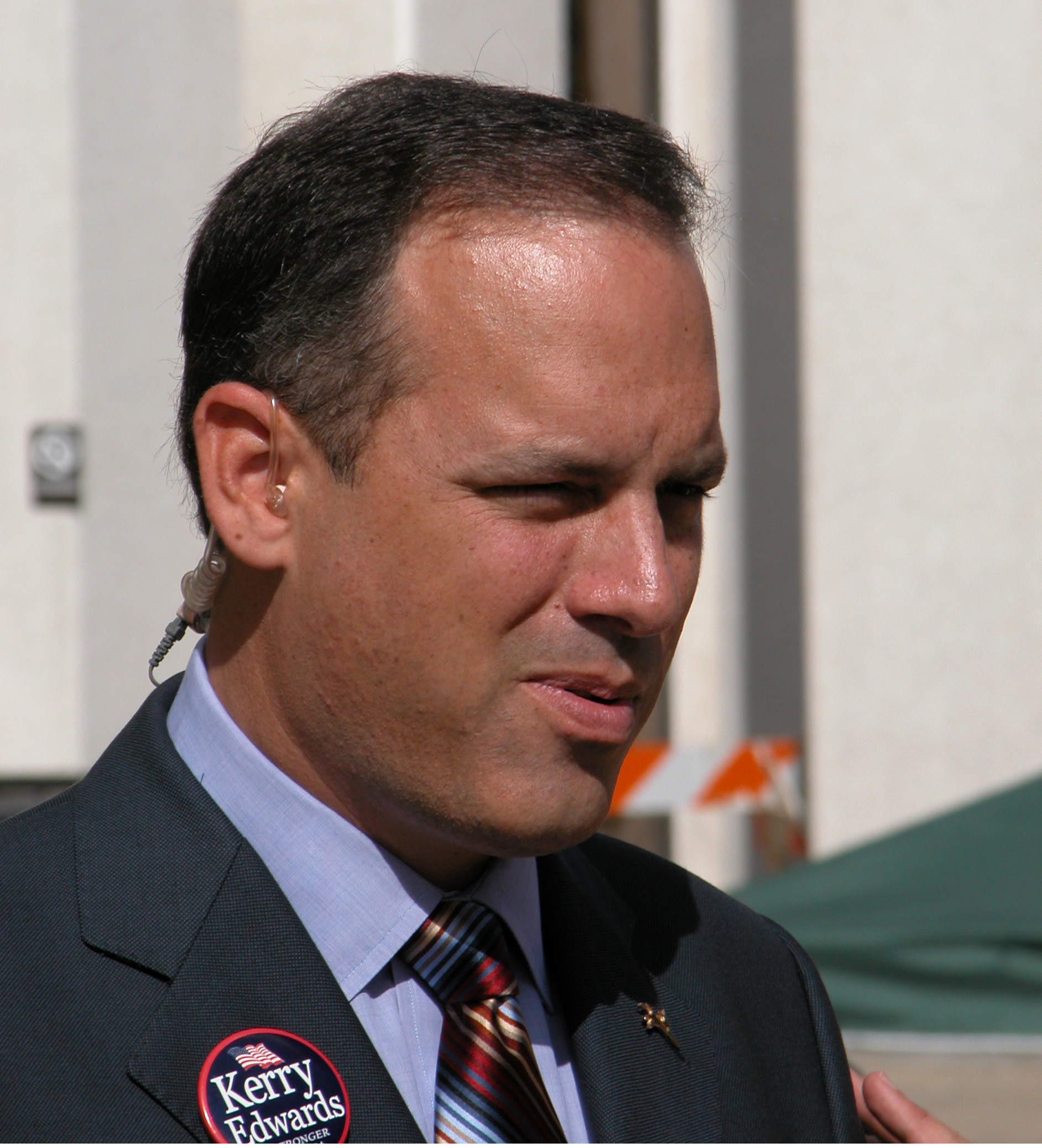

122nd and 124th Mayor of Tallahassee
- In office February 28, 1997 – February 28, 2003
- Preceded by: Ron Weaver
- Succeeded by: John Marks
- In office March 2, 1995 – March 1, 1996
- Preceded by: Penny Herman
- Succeeded by: Ron Weaver

Chair of the Florida Democratic Party
- In office January 4, 2003 – September 13, 2005
- Preceded by: Bob Poe
- Succeeded by: Karen Thurman

Member of the Tallahassee City Commission
- In office November 19, 2012 – December 12, 2018
- Preceded by: Mark Mustian
- Succeeded by: Elaine W. Bryant
- Constituency: Seat 1
- In office February 1993 – March 1995

Personal details
- Born: Scott Charles Maddox; March 13, 1968 (age 58)
- Party: Democratic
- Education: Florida State University (BS, JD)

Scott Charles Maddox (born March 13, 1968) is an American politician. He was the mayor of Tallahassee, Florida, from 1995 to 1996 and from 1997 to 2005. Maddox is the former chair of the Florida Democratic Party and a former Tallahassee City Commissioner, serving from 1993 to 1995, 1996 to 1997 and from 2012 to 2018.

Maddox was indicted on December 12, 2018, on 44 charges, including racketeering, bribery, extortion, bank fraud and wire fraud, in an FBI investigation into corruption that played a key role in Democrat Andrew Gillum’s campaign for Florida governor. Maddox was suspended from the Tallahassee City Commission following the indictment and subsequently replaced after the appointment of Commissioner Elaine W. Bryant, Ph.D. on December 31, 2018. In September 2021, Maddox was sentenced to five years in prison. He was released on May 9, 2023.

== Early life and education ==
Scott Maddox was born in Hialeah, Florida, and raised in the rural area of Homestead, Florida, and later, in Tallahassee, Florida. He graduated from Leon High School and attended Florida State University, where he earned a B.S. in political science and public administration. He went on to earn a J.D. from Florida State University College of Law. Maddox was a member of the Kappa Alpha Order men's fraternity.

== Political career ==
In 1990, at the age of 22, Maddox ran for the Florida House of Representative's 10th district, but lost the Democratic primary by 32%. In 1993, while still in law school, Maddox became the youngest city commissioner in the city of Tallahassee's history, being elected at the age of 24, and a year later selected to become mayor pro-tempore. In 1995, the city commission chose Maddox as the city's mayor, where he worked towards improving race relations and overseeing a large expansion of city parks, greenways, and trails. After the residents of Tallahassee passed a referendum calling for popular elections for the office of mayor, Maddox became Tallahassee's first popularly elected city mayor in 1996. In 1999, he served as president of the Florida League of Cities. Described as a "rising star" by Vice President Al Gore, Maddox spoke at the 2000 Democratic National Convention. Maddox attempted a run for Attorney General of Florida in 2002, but lost to future Orlando mayor Buddy Dyer in the Democratic primary. In 2003, Maddox was elected chairman of the Florida Democratic Party and also served as a member of the Democratic National Committee. Though Maddox announced a run for Governor of Florida in 2006, he ultimately dropped out of the race. In 2010, he served as the Democratic nominee for Florida's Commissioner of Agriculture and Consumer Services, losing to Republican nominee Adam Putnam. Maddox was elected to the Tallahassee City Commission once again in 2012. In 2015, he announced a run for Superintendent of Leon County Schools. After failing to gain traction in the Democratic primary, Maddox dropped out during qualifying week. He was subsequently re-elected to the city commission in August 2016.

== Electoral history ==
Democratic primary, Florida Attorney General election, 2002
Party	Candidate	Votes	%
Democratic	Buddy Dyer	457,704	37.2
Democratic	Scott Maddox	429,651	34.9
Democratic	George H. Sheldon	272,517	22.1
Democratic	Walt Dartland	71,952	5.8
Total votes		1,231,824	100

Agriculture Commissioner of Florida General election, 2010
Party	Candidate	Votes	%
Republican	Adam H. Putnam	2,908,086	55.94
Democratic	Scott Maddox	1,983,277	38.15
Tea Party of Florida	Ira Chester	203,598	3.92
Independent	Thad Hamilton	103,717	2.00
Total votes		5,198,678	100

Party political offices
Preceded by Eric Copeland	Democratic nominee for Florida Commissioner of Agriculture; 2010	Succeeded by Thad Hamilton
