= 2018 Tallahassee mayoral election =

- August 28, 2018 (first round); November 6, 2018 (second round)
- Turnout: 32.76% (first round); 38.19% (second round)
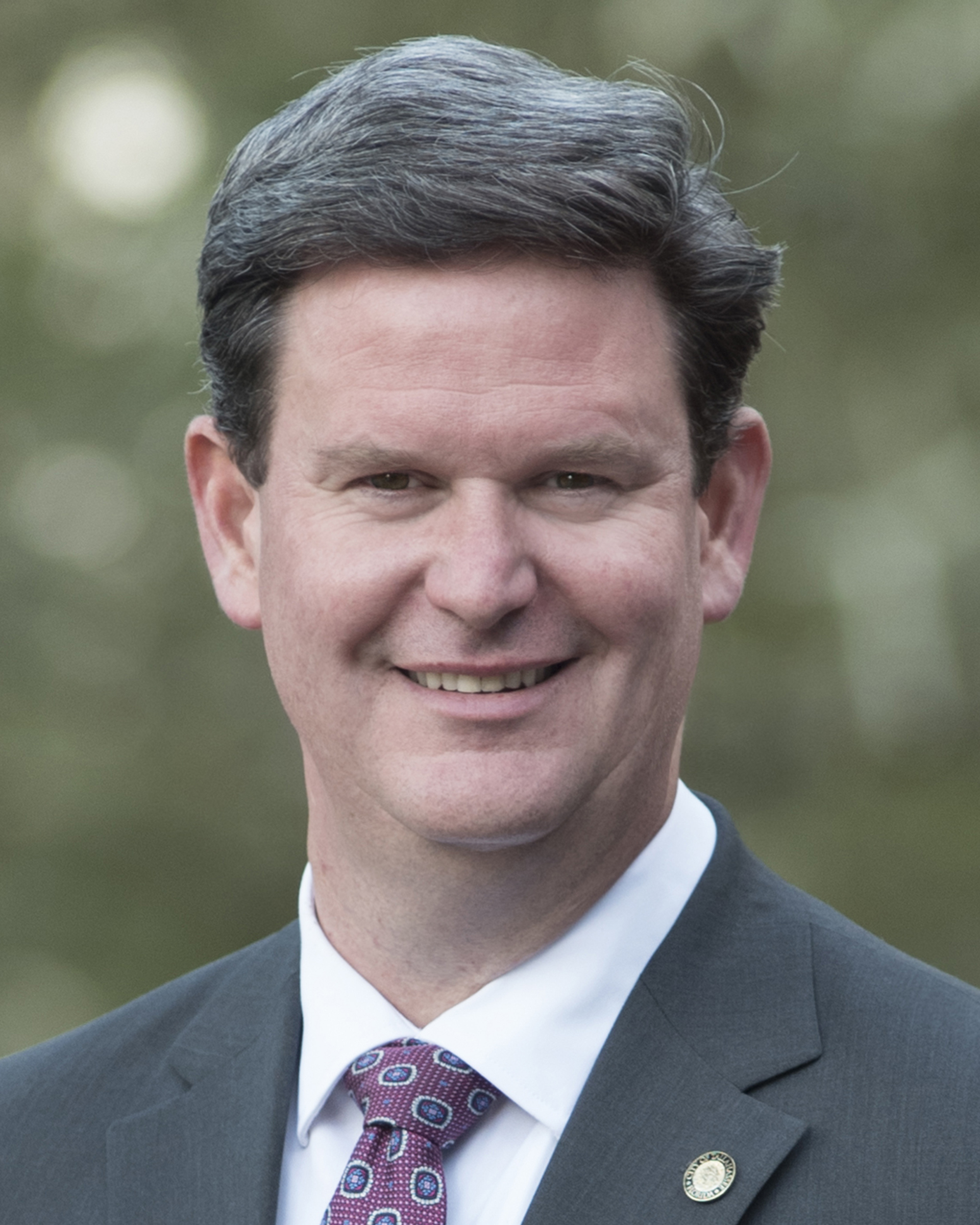

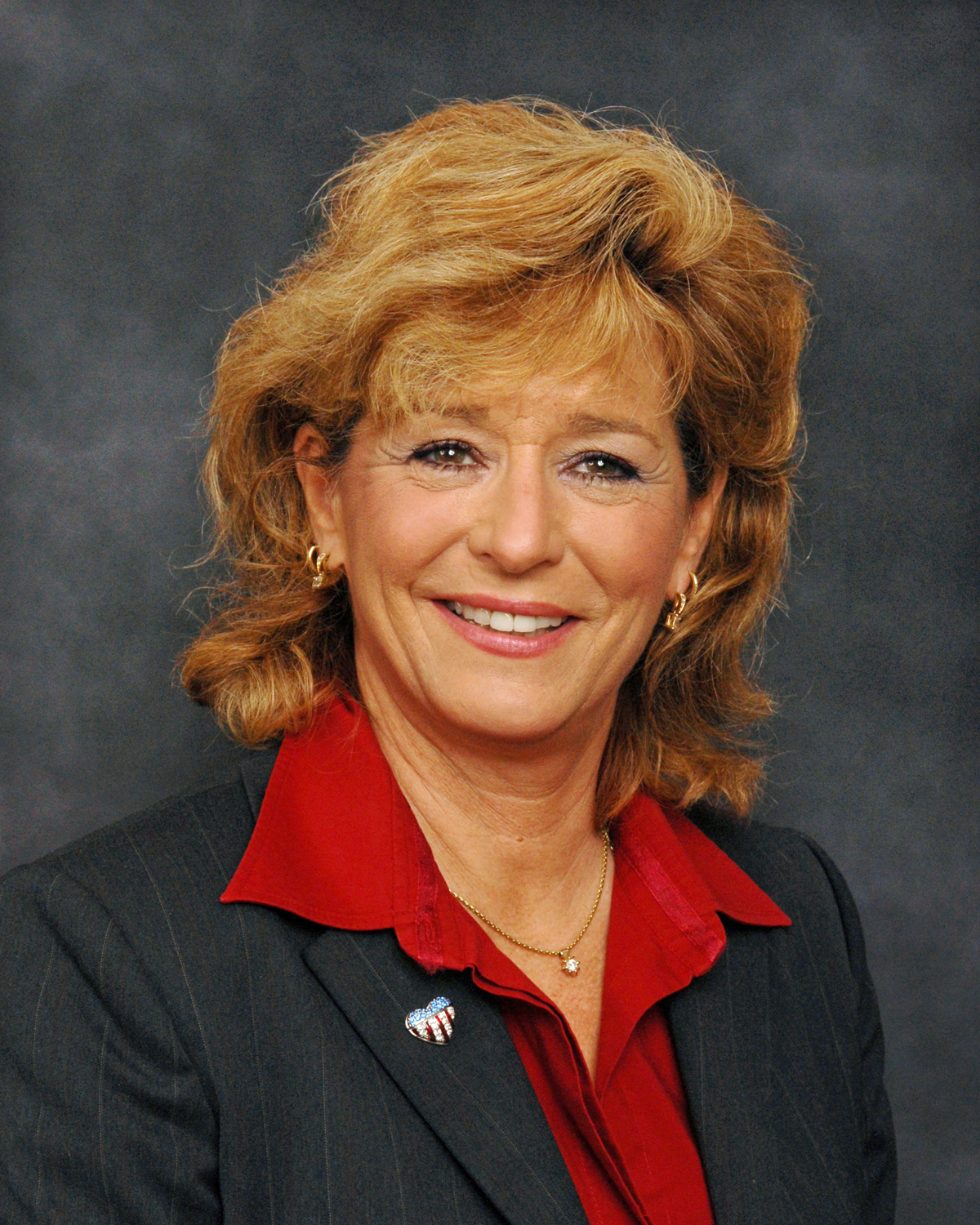
Nominee	John E. Dailey	Dustin R. Daniels
Party	Nonpartisan	Nonpartisan
First-round vote	17,369	11,098
First-round percentage	39.72%	25.38%
Second-round vote	41,316	39,072
Second-round percentage	51.4%	48.6%
Nominee	Michelle Rehwinkel Vasilinda	Carrie Litherland
Party	Nonpartisan	Nonpartisan
First-round vote	9,137	2,789
First-round percentage	20.89%	6.38%
Mayor before election
Andrew Gillum
Nonpartisan
Elected mayor
John E. Dailey
Nonpartisan

The 2018 Tallahassee mayoral election took place on August 28 and November 6, 2018, to elect the mayor of Tallahassee, Florida.

Incumbent mayor Andrew Gillum decided to focus his campaign on the 2018 Florida gubernatorial election instead of seeking re-election which opened up a new seat for the mayor's office. A blanket primary was held on August 28 with both John E. Dailey and Dustin R. Daniels receiving the most votes. Because neither candidate received a majority, a run-off election was held on November 8. From there, Dailey defeated Daniels by a close margin of 51% to 49%.

== Candidates ==
=== Declared ===
- Norris Barr, former employee
- John E. Dailey, chairman of the Leon County Commission
- Dustin R. Daniels, mayor's chief of staff
- Carrie Litherland, advocate
- Michelle Rehwinkel Vasilinda, attorney, professor
- Joe West, veteran

=== Potential ===
- Bill Montford, state senator

=== Withdrawn ===
- Erik David, instructor, veteran
- Bob Lotane, communications executive
- Gil Ziffer, city commissioner

== Results ==
=== First round ===
2018 Tallahassee mayoral election results (first round)
Candidate	Votes	%
John E. Dailey	17,369	39.72
Dustin R. Daniels	11,098	25.38
Michelle Rehwinkel Vasilinda	9,137	20.89
Carrie Litherland	2,789	6.38
Joe West	1,758	4.02
Mike Suarez	2,462	5.06
Norris H. Barr	1,579	3.61
Total votes	43,730	

=== Runoff ===
2018 Tallahassee mayoral election results (runoff)
Candidate	Votes	%
John E. Dailey	41,316	51.4
Dustin R. Daniels	39,072	48.6
Total votes	80,388	
