= John Marks (mayor) =

American politician

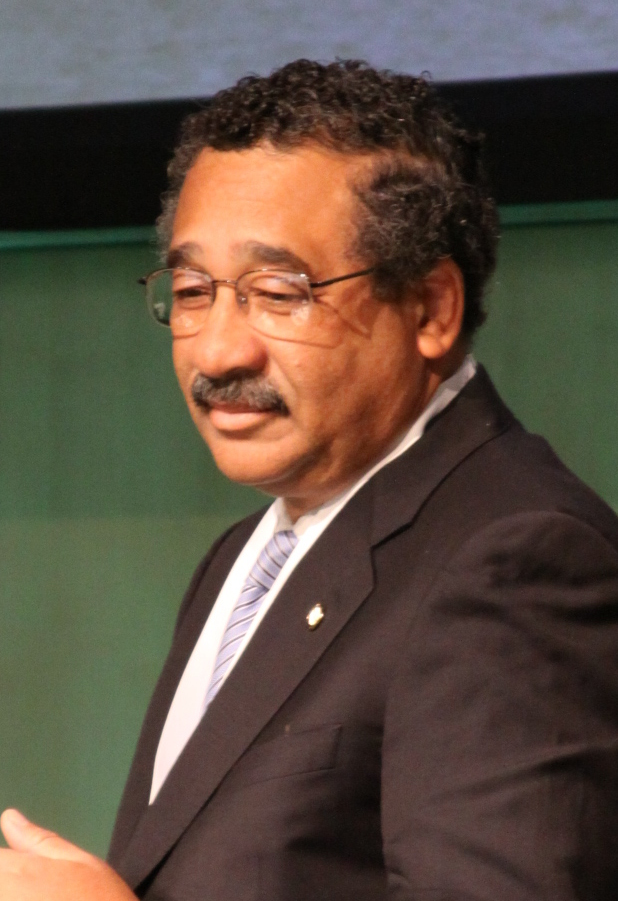
- Marks in 2010

125th Mayor of Tallahassee
- In office February 28, 2003 – November 21, 2014
- Preceded by: Scott Maddox
- Succeeded by: Andrew Gillum

Personal details
- Born: John Robert Marks III; July 25, 1947 (age 79)
- Party: Democratic
- Spouse: Jane A. Marks
- Children: John R. Marks IV
- Profession: Attorney

John Robert Marks III (born July 25, 1947) is an American lawyer, politician, and former Mayor of Tallahassee, Florida from February 2003 until November 2014. Marks is the longest-serving mayor in Tallahassee's history. He was elected to three consecutive terms as the city's Mayor, spanning nearly ten years. He won a third term in 2010, but declined to seek re-election for a fourth term in 2014. He was succeeded by Andrew Gillum on November 21, 2014.

Marks was Tallahassee's fifth African-American mayor but the first to be elected.

== Biography ==
Marks' great-grandfather, Oliver Lewis Coleman, founded Coleman College, a now defunct historically black college in Gibsland, Louisiana, in 1887. Coleman College closed in 1952.

He received his B.S. in 1969 from the Florida State University School of Business and his Juris Doctor in 1972 from the Florida State University College of Law. He and his wife, Jane, have a son, John Marks IV (born c. 1976).

== Career ==
Marks served eight years on the Florida Public Service Commission (FPSC) and spent the last two as its chairman, after being appointed in 1979 by Governor Bob Graham. He served on the FPSC during the divestiture of AT&T and was instrumental in the implementation of the Federal Public Utility Regulatory Policies Act (PURPA). Before being appointed, he served as an Administrative Law Judge on the Commission. He is a partner in the Tallahassee -based Marks & Marks law firm. He has been an adjunct professor at FSU's College of Law, teaching utility regulatory law and a faculty member of the National Association of Regulatory Utility Commissioners' utility rate school.

== Mayor of Tallahassee ==
On January 4, 2003, Marks' predecessor, then-Tallahassee Mayor Scott Maddox, was elected Chairman of the Florida Democratic Party. Marks announced that he would remain Mayor of Tallahassee until late February 2003, when a special mayor election would be held to choose his successor.

Marks, a former state public service commissioner, entered the 2003 race for Mayor to succeed Maddox. On February 4, 2003, Marks placed first in the mayoral election with 43% against three other candidates. His closest opponent, John Paul Bailey, a Republican Tallahassee City Commissioner and former police officer, placed second with 27% of the vote. City Commissioner Steve Meisburg placed third with 26%, while two other candidates, Tony Davis and Richard Junnier, each received 2% of the vote.

Since no candidate garnered more than 50% in the initial election, a runoff election between Marks and Republican John Paul Bailey was held on February 25, 2003. Marks defeated Bailey by a 2-to-1 margin in the runoff. Marks received 19,118 votes (67.10%), while John Paul Bailey garnered 9,374 votes (32.90%).

== See also ==
- List of first African-American mayors
