= Rocky Comfort Creek (Florida) =

Stream in the United States of America

- Location within Florida Location within the United States

Location
- Country: United States
- State: Florida
- County: Gadsden

Physical characteristics
- Source
  - coordinates: 30°36′05″N 84°39′41″W
- Mouth: Lake Talquin
  - coordinates: 30°26′49″N 84°33′22″W
  - elevation: 66 feet (20 m)

Rocky Comfort Creek is a stream near Florida's capital city of Tallahassee. It now feeds into Lake Talquin which was formed by a dam on the Ochlockonee River.

David Ochiltree who served as mayor of Tallahassee in 1827 resided in a home by the creek and died there in 1834. He moved to Florida from Fayetteville, North Carolina. He was also a colonel and was a member elect of the Legislative Council for Gadsden County when he died.

A historical marker commemorates Bryan Croom's Rocky Comfort plantation. He was the brother of Hardy Bryan Croom.

Lake Talquin State Forest has a Rocky Comfort tract.
