= Thomas James Perkins =

Intendant Mayor of Tallahassee, Florida

Thomas James Perkins (May 3, 1817 – August 6, 1896) was a lawyer, railroad employee, intendant Mayor of Tallahassee, Florida, and a partner in a cotton trading business.

He was born to John Day Perkins and Elizabeth Bradshaw Perkins in Queen Anne's County, Maryland. He settled in Tallahassee in 1837, years before statehood, and worked for a railroad company. The Florida Archives have a portrait of him and his wife Amelia Mather Keowin Perkins. They had ten children.
