= Thomas Perkins (politician) =

American politician (1931–2024)

Member of the Maine House of Representatives from the 43rd district
- In office 1975–1979
- Succeeded by: Meredith Bordeaux

Member of the Maine Senate from the 28th district (1979–1985) and 12th district (1985–1991)
- In office 1979–1991
- Preceded by: Cecil H. McNally
- Succeeded by: Ruth S. Foster

Personal details
- Born: February 15, 1931 Patten, Maine, U.S.
- Died: October 13, 2024 (aged 93)
- Party: Republican

Thomas Ralph Perkins (February 15, 1931 – October 13, 2024) was an American politician from the state of Maine. Born in Patten, Maine, he graduated from the Massachusetts College of Pharmacy in 1953 and ran a drug store in Blue Hill, Maine, for thirty years. He served as a Republican member of the Maine House of Representatives from 1975 to 1979, and of the Maine Senate from 1979 to 1991. Perkins died on October 13, 2024, at the age of 93.

== Electoral history ==
=== 1974 ===
Maine House of Representatives, District 43, 1974 election * denotes incumbent Source:
Party	Candidate	Votes	%
Republican	Thomas Perkins	1,870	59.3
Democratic	W. Stanley Reed	1,281	40.6
write-in	Virgil Don Mahoney	1	0.0
Total votes		3,152	100

=== 1976 ===
Maine House of Representatives, District 43, 1976 election * denotes incumbent Source:
Party	Candidate	Votes	%
Republican	Thomas Perkins*	2,698	67.7
Democratic	Ellen Histen	1,290	32.3
Total votes		3,988	100

=== 1978 ===
Maine Senate, District 28, 1978 election * denotes incumbent Source:
Party	Candidate	Votes	%
Republican	Thomas Perkins	10,163	81.5
Independent	Virgil Don Mahoney	2,309	18.5
Total votes		12,472	100

=== 1980 ===
Maine Senate, District 28, 1980 election * denotes incumbent Source:
Party	Candidate	Votes	%
Republican	Thomas Perkins*	15,226	99.9
	scattering	19	0.1
Total votes		15,245	100

=== 1982 ===
Maine Senate, District 28, 1982 election * denotes incumbent Source:
Party	Candidate	Votes	%
Republican	Thomas Perkins*	10,458	69.1
Democratic	Bronson Platner	4,666	30.9
Total votes		15,124	100

=== 1984 ===
Maine Senate, District 12, 1984 election * denotes incumbent Source:
Party	Candidate	Votes	%
Republican	Thomas Perkins*	13,227	76.5
Democratic	Carroll T. Brown	4,059	23.5
Total votes		17,286	100

=== 1986 ===
Maine Senate, District 12, 1986 election * denotes incumbent Source:
Party	Candidate	Votes	%
Republican	Thomas Perkins*	10,206	75.0
Democratic	Carroll T. Brown	3,404	25.0
Total votes		13,610	100

=== 1988 ===
Maine Senate, District 12, 1988 election * denotes incumbent Source:
Party	Candidate	Votes	%
Republican	Thomas Perkins*	13,101	73.9
Democratic	Evans Munroe	4,638	26.1
Total votes		17,739	100
