= James R. Ford =

American politician (1925–2017)

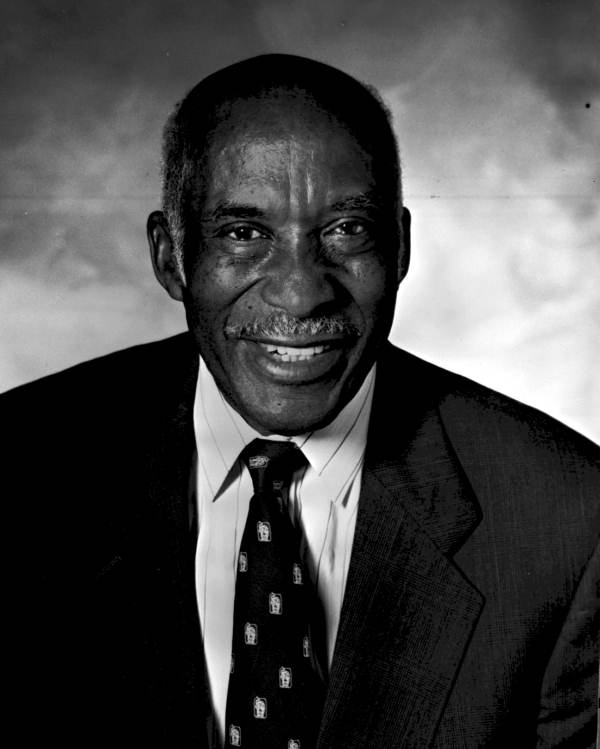
- Ford

Mayor of Tallahassee, Florida
- In office 1972–1972
- Preceded by: Gene Berkowitz
- Succeeded by: Joan Heggen
- In office 1976–1976
- Preceded by: John R. Jones
- Succeeded by: Neal D. Sapp
- In office 1982–1982
- Preceded by: Hurley W. Rudd
- Succeeded by: Carol Bellamy

Personal details
- Born: December 1, 1925 Leon County, Florida
- Died: October 11, 2017 (aged 91)
- Party: Democratic
- Education: Florida A&M University

James R. Ford (December 1, 1925 – October 11, 2017) was an American educator, politician, and businessman. In 1972, Ford became the first African-American mayor of Tallahassee, Florida, and the first Black mayor of a U.S. state capital city. He later served for fourteen years as a city commissioner, being repeatedly re-elected.

== Early life and career ==
Ford was born and raised in Leon County, attending local public schools, which were segregated. He went to college at Florida A&M University, a historically black university, where he earned his B.S. in 1950 and his MEd in 1959. He served in both the U.S. Navy and the U.S. Army.

He worked in the Leon County public school system from 1950 to 1987, starting as a teacher. Later he became the county system's first Black administrator, presiding over Leon County's first integrated school staff.

== Mayor of Tallahassee ==
In 1971, he was elected as a Tallahassee city commissioner. In 1972, Ford was elected as Tallahassee's first African-American mayor and the first African-American mayor of any state capital city. He was elected to subsequent terms as mayor in 1976 and 1982 while serving during the interim periods as a city commissioner (1973–1975 and 1977–1981) as well as after his last term (1983–1985). As mayor and commissioner, he played a key role in establishing the Minority Business Department, the Frenchtown Area Development Authority, and the Affirmative Action Office. He also worked to eliminate segregated practices in the city government and to secure employment opportunities for Blacks.

== Business career ==
Ford was also active in the business community. He built WAMN Radio Station, becoming Tallahassee's first Black manager of a radio station. He owned and managed six businesses and acted as the president of CNJ Associates.

== Civic activities ==
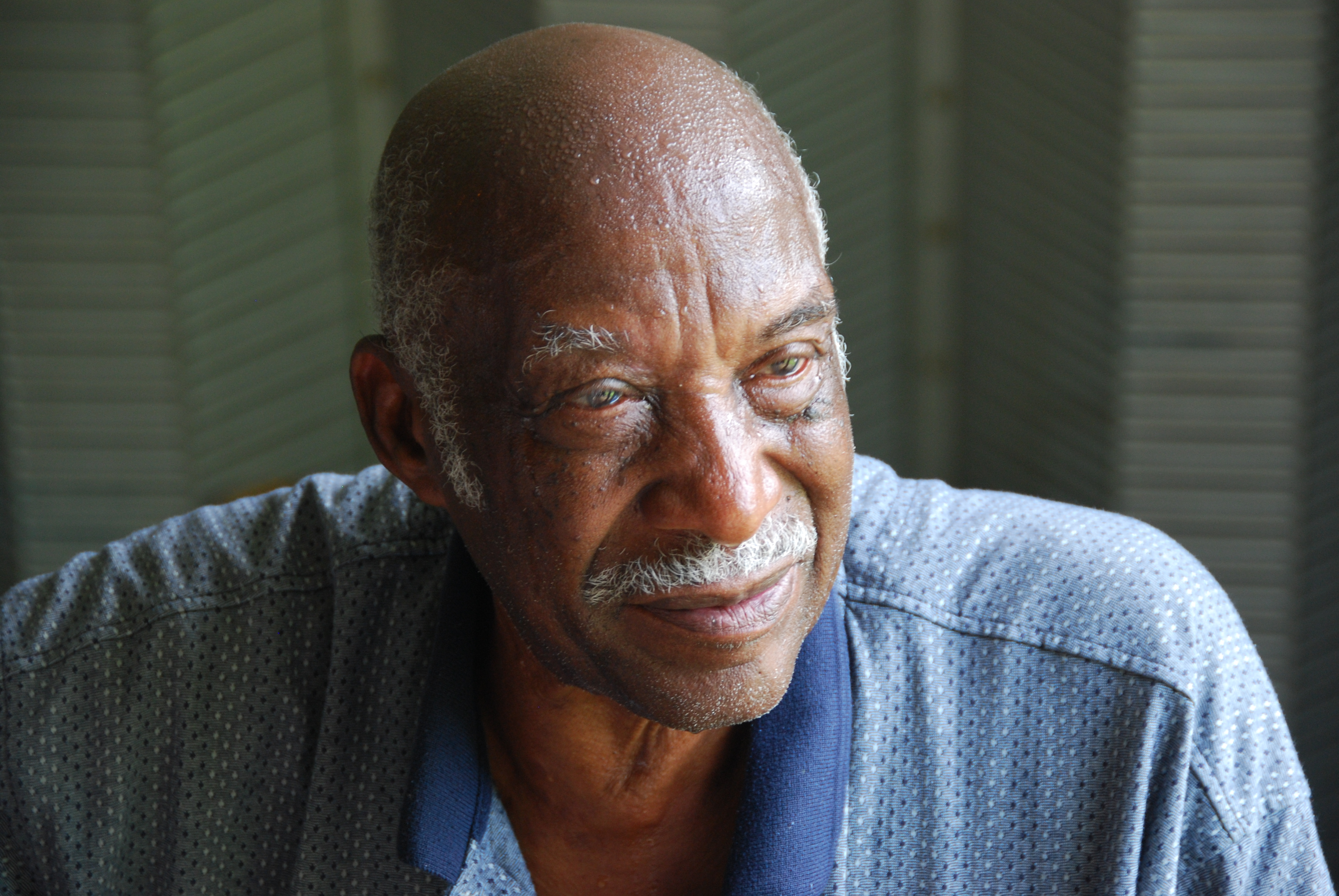
James R. Ford, 2008

Ford served as the president of Sigma Phi Pi and Alpha Phi Alpha fraternities, which he had joined in college. He was president of the Tallahassee Urban League and the Tallahassee chapter of 100 Black Men. He was commander of the Tallahassee Sail and Power Squadron.

He also sat on the boards of the Chamber of Commerce, the United Way, Meals on Wheels, the March of Dimes Big Bend Chapter, the American Red Cross's Tallahassee Chapter, and the Florida League of Cities. He also sat on the boards of the Tallahassee Memorial Regional Medical Center, the Lively Vocational School and Peoples 1st Community Bank.

== Personal life ==
He married Clinita, and they had three children together: a son James R. Ford Jr. and two daughters, Janita and JaKathryn. Ford died on October 11, 2017, at the age of 91.

== See also ==
- List of first African-American mayors
