= Andrew Gillum =

American politician (born 1979)

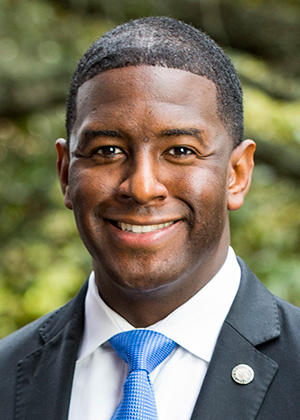
- Gillum in 2014

126th Mayor of Tallahassee
- In office November 21, 2014 – November 19, 2018
- Preceded by: John Marks
- Succeeded by: John E. Dailey

Member of the Tallahassee City Commission for the 2nd seat
- In office February 28, 2003 – November 21, 2014
- Preceded by: John Paul Bailey
- Succeeded by: Curtis Richardson

Personal details
- Born: Andrew Demetric Gillum; July 26, 1979 (age 47) Miami, Florida, U.S.
- Party: Democratic
- Spouse: Jai Howard (m. 2009)
- Children: 3
- Education: Florida A&M University (BA)
- Website: Official website

Andrew Demetric Gillum (born July 26, 1979) is a former American politician who was the 126th mayor of Tallahassee, Florida, from 2014 to 2018. A member of the Democratic Party, he served as a Tallahassee city commissioner from 2003 to 2014.

Gillum was the Democratic nominee in the 2018 Florida gubernatorial election, defeating a crowded Democratic field and narrowly losing to Republican congressman Ron DeSantis in the general election. His margin of defeat – 34,000 votes (0.4% of the vote) – is one of the closest for a gubernatorial race in modern American history.

== Early life and education ==
Gillum was born in Miami and raised in Gainesville, Florida. He is the fifth of seven children born to Charles and Frances Gillum, respectively a construction worker and a school bus driver. Gillum graduated from Gainesville High School in 1998 and was recognized by the Gainesville Sun as one of the city's "persons of the year." He then moved to Tallahassee to attend Florida Agricultural and Mechanical University (FAMU).

Gillum served as president of the FAMU Student Government Association from 2001 to 2002 and was the first student member of the FAMU Board of Trustees. He was recognized by the Congressional Black Caucus Foundation as "emerging leader for 2003." Gillum was also a board member of the Black Youth Vote Coalition, a program of the National Coalition of Black Civic Participation in Washington, D.C. Gillum was elected to the Tallahassee City Commission prior to the completion of his college studies.

In 2003, Gillum graduated from FAMU with a bachelor's degree in political science.

== Political career ==
=== City of Tallahassee commissioner ===
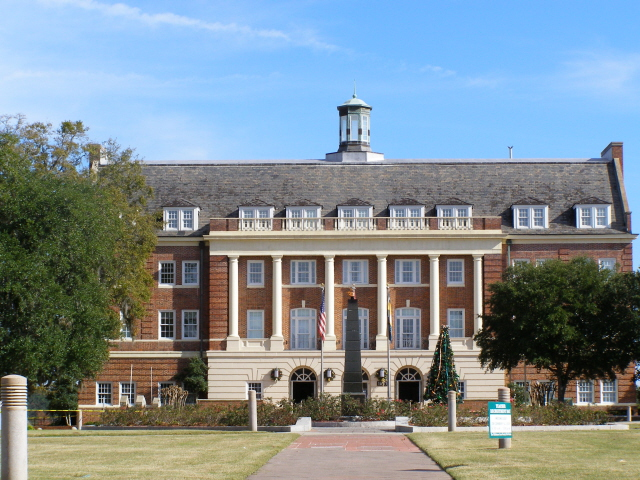
Gillum graduated from Florida A&M University in 2003 with a Bachelor of Arts degree in political science.

Gillum served as a Tallahassee city commissioner from 2003 to 2014.

In 2003, at age 23, Gillum was elected to the Tallahassee City Commission for a one-year term, becoming the youngest person to be elected to the commission. Gillum was a political science student at FAMU when he was elected.

In 2004, he was elected to a full four-year term, garnering 72 percent of the vote, and was reelected in 2008 and again in 2012.

Gillum served a one-year term as Mayor Pro Tem from November 10, 2004, to November 9, 2005. The joint body of city and county commissioners, known as the Capital Region Transportation Planning Agency, elected him to serve as their chairperson for a year, January 2005 to December 2005. Gillum has also served as lead commissioner for the Long Range Community Based Target Issue Committee.

In 2005, Gillum was one of the commissioners who voted to give themselves a new retirement benefit through deferred compensation. The policy was later repealed by the commission after public outrage.

==== City of Tallahassee projects ====
During his 11 years as a city commissioner, Gillum championed a number of community enrichment projects. The Digital Harmony Project is an initiative championed by Gillum with support from the City of Tallahassee, local businesses and technology partnerships. Digital Harmony won the Significant Achievement Award in the Web & e-Government Services category from the Public Technology Institute. For the first two years, it provided every incoming Nims Middle School sixth and seventh-grader with a new desktop computer, free internet access and online academic curriculum training on core subjects. The school holds ongoing training courses for parents and students on basic computer skills and school curriculum. This effort places 200 computers into the homes of Nims Middle School students.

Gillum championed the opening of the first Tallahassee Teen Center, the Palmer Munroe Center, which serves as a safe haven for many area youth and operates a restorative justice program. Restorative justice programs have shown significant success, compared to non-restorative measures, in improving victim and/or offender satisfaction, increasing offender compliance with restitution, and decreasing the recidivism of offenders. Gillum stressed these results as some of the reasons for the great importance of the Palmer Munroe Center.

Gillum supported the city's development project of Cascades Park, located in downtown Tallahassee. The park was built in 2013 and doubles as a storm-water management facility, protecting local neighborhoods from flooding.

=== Mayor of Tallahassee ===
==== Election ====
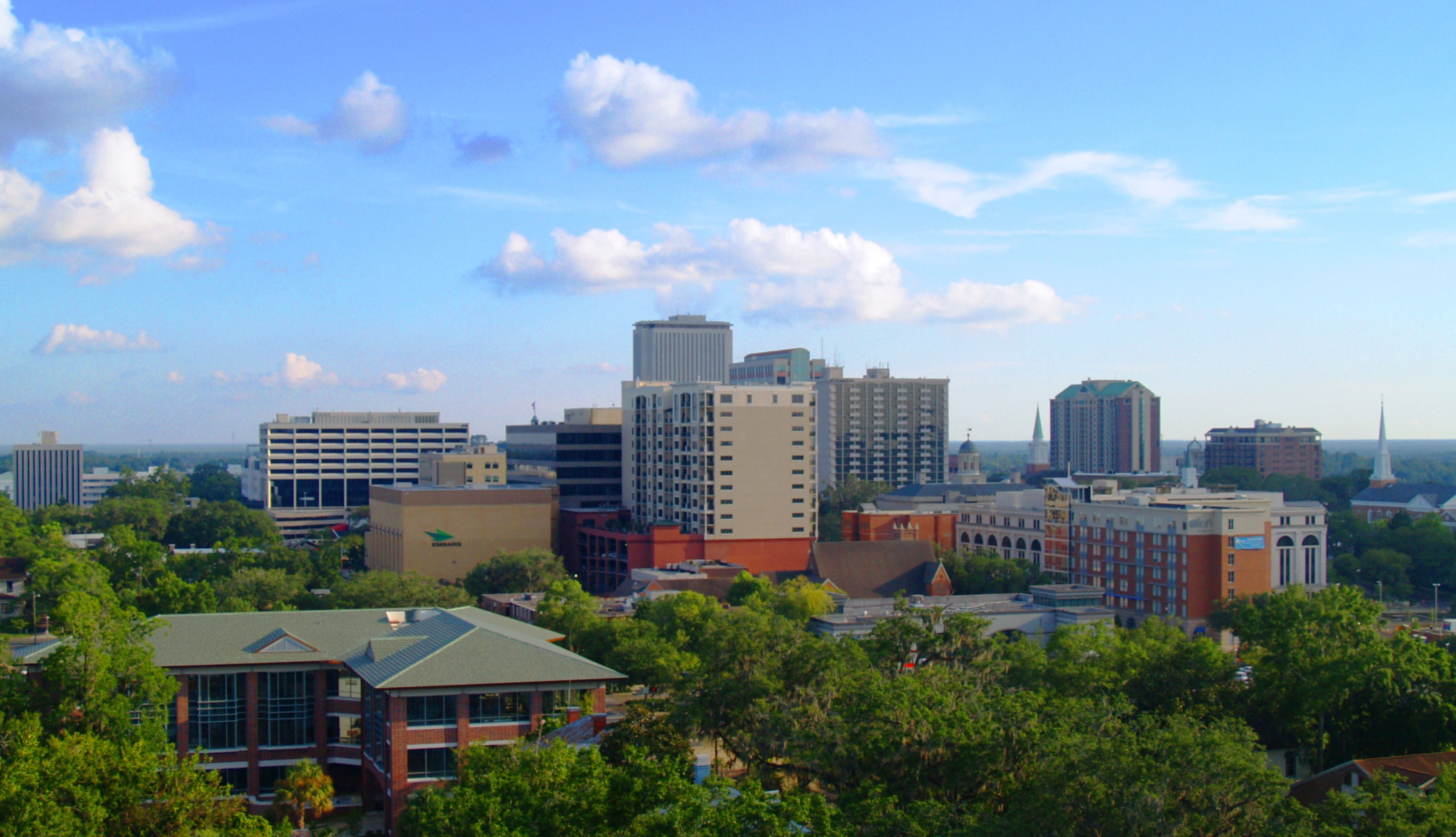
Gillum was elected mayor of Tallahassee in 2014.

In April 2013, Gillum announced his intention to run for mayor of Tallahassee. Gillum ran against three opponents: Larry Hendricks, Zach Richardson, and write-in candidate Evin Matthews. In the August 26, 2014 nonpartisan primary, Gillum defeated Richardson and Hendricks, winning 76 percent of the vote with 19,658 votes. A run-off election was scheduled to be held on November 4 between Gillum and write-in candidate Evin Matthews. Mathews withdrew from the race on August 27, 2014, resulting in Gillum becoming the mayor-elect.

==== Tenure ====
Before taking office, Gillum met with various mayors to learn from their successes. He also launched the Tallahassee Mayoral Fellows Program in partnership with Florida Agricultural And Mechanical University and Florida State University, allowing high-achieving graduate students to gain experience working in City government. Gillum was sworn into Office on November 21, 2014.

In January 2015, Gillum strongly supported the City of Tallahassee joining in the Ban the Box campaign, arguing that the initiative does not stop the city from conducting background checks, but rather gives applicants a fair shot at employment and reduces recidivism. On January 28 the Tallahassee City Commission voted 3–2 to drop the box.

On February 17, 2015, Gillum welcomed United States secretary of transportation Anthony Foxx to Tallahassee to kick off the Grow America Express Tour. Gillum also contributed to the DOT Fastlane Blog, in which he stressed the importance of long-term transportation investments for America's mid-size cities.

In an effort to overhaul how City Advisory Committees, a series of local advisory boards, operate in Tallahassee, Mayor Gillum released a survey in March 2015 to gain feedback into the city's numerous boards and motivate citizens to get involved with local government. Also in March 2015, Gillum participated in a conference call with other Florida mayors and United States deputy secretary of commerce, Bruce Andrews. In the call Gillum stated his support for Congress to pass trade promotion legislation that would bolster international trade, and stressed the importance for local governments of a leveled playing field.

On March 27, 2015, Gillum held the Mayor's Summit on Children, a large conference in which business and community leaders came together to learn about the importance of investments in quality Early Childhood Education (ECE).

On the heels of the Summit on Children, Gillum launched four community-led task forces as part of his Family First Agenda; these task forces, which Gillum introduced at the Summit, examine: Improved Quality and Affordable Child Care, Family Friendly Workplaces and Culture, Greater Community Investments in Children and Families, and Resources and Training for Parents and Families. Gillum stressed that investments in early childhood education have been proven to return six dollars for every one dollar invested. This is due to lowering community costs on those children as they grow older.

In May 2015, Gillum launched a 1,000 Mentors Initiative, which aimed to recruit 1,000 men and women from diverse backgrounds to increase youth mentoring opportunities in Tallahassee, and help youth in need. Also in May 2015, Gillum, in partnership with several local and national organizations, orchestrated the Tallahassee Future Leaders Academy (TFLA), a summer jobs program which employed over 100 youths throughout city government. Gillum summarized the importance of a program like the TFLA in a July Op-ed, in which he highlighted how similar summer jobs programs from around the country have been shown to reduce arrests for violent crime, reduce youth mortality rates, and increase the likelihood of college attendance.

In response to an increase in shootings, Gillum and the Tallahassee Police Department worked with community organizations to implement Operation Safe Neighborhoods in 2015. This initiative called for an increase in law enforcement visibility and capacity; strengthening strategic partnerships and community programs/opportunities; and enhancing community engagement and response, through the implementation of a community watch program called, Neighbors on the Block.

In October 2015, more than 400 strangers gathered around a 350-foot-long table in downtown Tallahassee to participate in the launch of The Longest Table, an annual initiative aiming to use the dinner table as a medium for generating meaningful conversation among people of diverse ethnic, religious, and political backgrounds. Organized by the Office of the Mayor and spearheaded by Community Engagement Director Jamie Van Pelt, the project won a $57,250 grant from the Knight Cities Challenge via the Knight Foundation.

== 2018 gubernatorial campaign ==
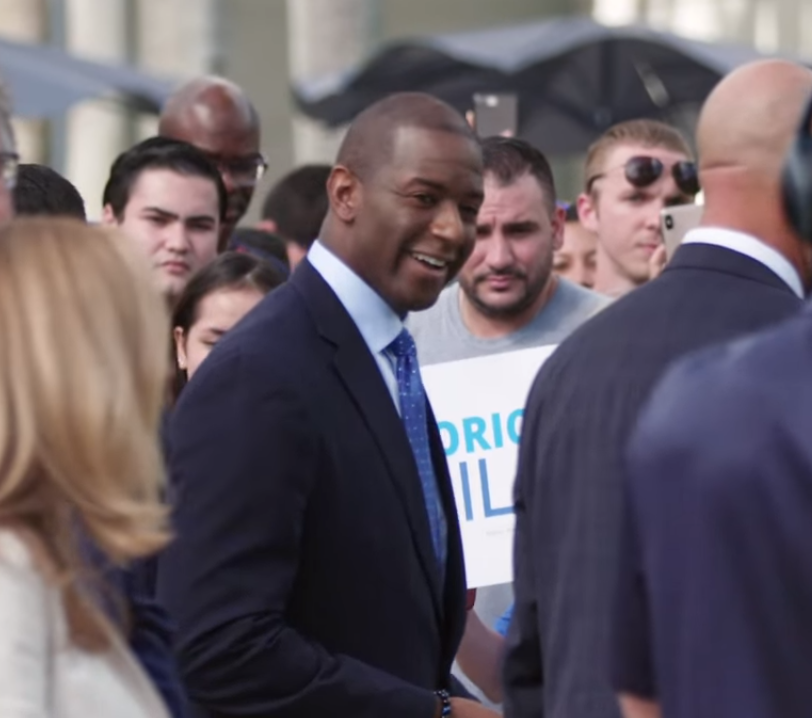
Andrew Gillum campaigning in 2018.

Gillum announced his candidacy for governor in March 2017, and was the first to declare his intention to run as a Democrat. Gillum won the Democratic nomination for governor in an upset victory over the expected winner, former Congresswoman Gwen Graham, by 34% to 31%, with 20% going to Miami Beach Mayor Philip Levine. Gillum was the first black nominee for governor in Florida's history. Gillum conceded to Republican candidate Ron DeSantis on the evening of November 6, 2018.

When the recount began, Gillum withdrew his concession, saying: "I am replacing my words of concession with an uncompromised and unapologetic call that we count every single vote." Gillum conceded again on November 17, after a machine recount was completed. The final tally showed that DeSantis had defeated Gillum by 36,219 votes, equalling about 0.4% of the over 8.2 million total votes cast.

The campaign was marked by racial controversy, as DeSantis was accused of using the verb monkey as a dog whistle when he said, "The last thing we need to do is to monkey this up by trying to embrace a socialist agenda with huge tax increases and bankrupting the state. That is not going to work. That's not going to be good for Florida." This “disastrous gaffe” was discussed by Dexter Filkins in The New Yorker:

DeSantis insisted that there was no racial motive behind the statement—"He uses a lot of dorky phrases like that," one of his former colleagues told me—and the outrage didn't endure. But his tone-deafness created a disadvantage. "We were handling Gillum with kid gloves," the lawyer close to DeSantis told me. "We can't hit the guy, because we're trying to defend the fact that we're not racist."

During the campaign, President Donald Trump claimed that Gillum was a "thief," which was also interpreted as a racial dog whistle.

In May 2019, the FBI subpoenaed Gillum regarding his gubernatorial campaign.

=== Political positions ===
Gillum has been widely described as a progressive, and by some conservatives as a democratic socialist. During the 2018 gubernatorial campaign, DeSantis said that Gillum had a "far left socialist platform"; PolitiFact rated this assertion as false.

Gillum supports the replacement of the U.S. Immigration and Customs Enforcement with the U.S. Department of Justice. He seeks to expand Medicaid to cover "700,000 people, who right now don't have access to health care". He supports the removal of Confederate monuments. Gillum wants to raise the Florida corporate tax rate to 7.75 percent, up from the current 5.5 percent, which he said would be used to fund education. Gillum supports a $15 minimum wage. He was endorsed by Bernie Sanders and received financial support from Tom Steyer and George Soros.

Gillum has called for the impeachment of Donald Trump. Gillum accepts the scientific consensus on climate change, and has warned that climate change causes sea level rise with adverse effects for Florida. He opposed the Trump administration's decision to withdraw from the Paris Agreement, and said that he would as Florida governor work with other states in a state-based climate alliance.

Gillum opposes Florida's stand-your-ground law. Gillum is in favor of a 2018 ballot proposition, Amendment 4, to restore the voting rights of most individuals who have completed felony convictions. Gillum said, "Floridians who have paid their debts deserve a second chance and they should have a voice in our state's future. Our current system for rights restoration is a relic of Jim Crow that we should end for good."

== Legal issues ==
During his mayoral campaign in 2014, Gillum faced allegations of misconduct after hiring private equity investor Adam Corey as his campaign treasurer. Corey is an investor in The Edison, a restaurant that received taxpayer money from the city to help with the Cascades Park development project. During a Federal Bureau of Investigation (FBI) investigation into the matter, city officials stated that Gillum's vote did not constitute a conflict of interest and Gillum cut ties with Corey.

In February 2017, Gillum apologized after the Tallahassee Democrat reported that his government office had been used to send emails through web-based software purchased from NGP VAN, a company that provides technology to Democratic and progressive campaigns. An investigation into the emails started after Paul Henry, a retired state trooper from Monticello, wrote State Attorney Jack Campbell in March to allege Gillum committed grand theft and official misconduct by paying for the software with city funds when he believed they served no public purpose. Gillum reimbursed the city for the $5,082.45 cost of the software on March 2, 2017. In August 2017, a Leon County grand jury declined to indict Gillum personally due to lack of evidence of criminal wrongdoing.

According to text messages uncovered by the Tampa Bay Times, Gillum accepted tickets to the Broadway musical Hamilton from his brother, Marcus Gillum, who got them through an undercover FBI agent conducting a corruption investigation. The agent was posing as a real estate developer. Gillum responded to the Tampa Bay Times story, "These messages only confirm what we have said all along. We did go to see Hamilton. I did get my ticket to Hamilton from my brother. At the time, we believed that they were reserved by friends of Adam's, Mike Miller. And when I got there after work, got my ticket, we went in there and saw it, assumed my brother paid for it, and so far as I know, that was the deal."

In late January 2019, the Florida Commission on Ethics found probable cause that Gillum violated state ethics laws when he accepted gifts during out-of-town excursions with lobbyists and vendors and failed to report them. Ultimately, a $5,000 settlement was agreed to on four out of the five charges.

In 2020, an inebriated Gillum was found by police in a hotel room with a gay male escort. Suspected methamphetamine packets were also found in the room. In March 2020, the Tallahassee Democrat reported that Gillum was one of three men, one of whom was experiencing a drug overdose, who were found by police with "plastic baggies of suspected crystal meth" in a hotel room in Miami Beach. No arrests were made. Initially, Gillum was too inebriated to speak with police. On March 16, Gillum stated that he would enter rehabilitation, citing struggles with alcohol and depression after narrowly losing the 2018 Florida gubernatorial race. Gillum checked himself into drug rehabilitation afterwards and announced a withdrawal from public life "for the foreseeable future."

On June 22, 2022, Gillum was indicted by the U.S. Attorney's Office in the Northern District of Florida on 21 felony counts, including wire fraud, conspiracy, and making false statements for allegedly diverting money raised during the campaign to a company controlled by Sharon Lettman-Hicks, one of his top advisors on his campaign, who then used the money to pay Gillum. In response, Gillum released a statement declaring his innocence and calling the indictment "political" in nature.

U.S. District Judge Allen Winsor refused to dismiss the federal charges levied against Gillum, disagreeing with Gillum's attorney's claim that he was singled out because he was a black gubernatorial candidate. The jury found Gillum not guilty on the charge of making false statements and was hung on the remaining counts. In May 2023, federal prosecutors moved to dismiss the remaining charges against Gillum.

On July 2, 2026, Gillum was arrested in Baldwin County, Alabama. Daphne Police Department officers initiated a traffic stop after he was observed driving erratically. During the stop, police initiated a probable cause search after noticing a glass pipe on the center console. The search found several rolled marijuana cigarettes and three packages of a substance that tested positive for methamphetamine. He was subsequently arrested. Being released the next day, he was charged with possession of dangerous drugs, use or possession of drug paraphernalia, and possession of marijuana. On July 4 he appeared on a panel at the Essence Festival of Culture in New Orleans, Louisiana without notifying organizers of his arrest two days prior. Gillum was arrested again on August 6, 2026, after missing a drug test and subsequently testing positive for methamphetamine.

== Honors and accolades ==
Gillum has received various honors and accolades. While attending FAMU, Gillum was recognized by the National Center for Policy Alternatives in Washington, D.C., as the country's top student leader in 2001. In 2004, he was named to Ebony magazine's "Fast Track 30 Leaders Who Are 30 and Under." Gillum was named as a "2010 Emerging Leader" by Essence Magazine.

As part of Florida A&M University's 2012 125th Anniversary Quasiquicentennial Celebration, Gillum was honored as an Outstanding Alumnus, along with 124 other FAMU alumni. Also in 2012, Gillum was named as one of "50 Young Progressive Activists Who Are Changing America," by The Huffington Post. In 2014, Gillum was named as one of the 40 Under 40 by The Washington Post political blog "The Fix."

== Personal life ==
On May 24, 2009, Gillum married Rashada Jai Howard, a fellow FAMU graduate. The couple has three children.

On September 14, 2020, Gillum came out as bisexual in an interview with Tamron Hall on her nationally syndicated talk show.

== Electoral history ==
=== Tallahassee City Commission ===
2003 Nonpartisan Primary, Tallahassee City Commission Seat 2
Candidate	Votes	%
Mayo Woodward	7,627	29.1
Andrew D. Gillum	6,662	25.4
Bob Henderson	6,439	24.5
Norma Parrish	4,090	15.6
Jack Traylor	1,013	3.9
Joshua Hicks	414	1.6
Total votes	26,245	

2003 Nonpartisan Runoff, Tallahassee City Commission Seat 2
Candidate	Votes	%
Andrew D. Gillum	16,119	56.9
Mayo Woodward	12,206	43.1
Total votes	28,325	

2004 Nonpartisan Primary, Tallahassee City Commission Seat 2
Candidate	Votes	%
Andrew D. Gillum	22,040	72.0
Allen Turnage	4,670	15.3
D.J. Johnson	3,903	12.8
Total votes	30,613	

2008 Election, Tallahassee City Commission Seat 2
Candidate	Votes	%
Andrew D. Gillum	Unopposed	–

2012 Nonpartisan Primary, Tallahassee City Commission Seat 2
Candidate	Votes	%
Andrew D. Gillum	20,329	72.2
Nick Halley	3,321	11.8
David (Bubba) Riddle	2,738	9.7
Jacob S. Eaton	1,769	6.3
Total votes	28,157	

=== Mayor of Tallahassee, 2014 ===
2014 Nonpartisan Primary, Mayor of Tallahassee
Candidate	Votes	%
Andrew D. Gillum	19,805	75.7
Zack Richardson	3,705	14.2
Larry Hendricks	2,661	10.2
Total votes	26,171	

=== Florida gubernatorial election, 2018 ===
2018 Florida Democratic gubernatorial primary results
Party	Candidate	Votes	%
Democratic	Andrew Gillum	517,417	34.3%
Democratic	Gwen Graham	472,735	31.3%
Democratic	Philip Levine	306,450	20.3%
Democratic	Jeff Greene	151,935	10.1%
Democratic	Chris King	37,464	2.5%
Democratic	John Wetherbee	14,355	1.0%
Democratic	Alex "Lundy" Lundmark	8,628	0.6%
Total votes		1,508,984	100.0%

2018 Florida gubernatorial election
Party	Candidate	Votes	%	±%
Republican	Ron DeSantis / Jeanette Núñez	4,076,186	49.59%	+1.45%
Democratic	Andrew Gillum / Chris King	4,043,723	49.19%	+2.12%
Reform	Darcy G. Richardson / Nancy Argenziano	47,140	0.57%	N/A
Independent	Kyle "KC" Gibson / Ellen Wilds	24,310	0.30%	N/A
Independent	Ryan Christopher Foley / John Tutton Jr.	14,630	0.18%	N/A
Independent	Bruce Stanley / Ryan Howard McJury	14,505	0.18%	N/A
n/a	Write-ins	67	0.00%	N/A
Total votes		8,220,561	100.0%	N/A
Republican hold				

Political offices
Preceded by John Marks	Mayor of Tallahassee; 2014–2018	Succeeded by John Dailey
Party political offices
Preceded by Charlie Crist	Democratic nominee for Governor of Florida; 2018	Succeeded by Charlie Crist
