= Mayor of Tallahassee, Florida =

Mayor of Tallahassee
- Seal of the City of Tallahassee

- Flag of the City of Tallahassee

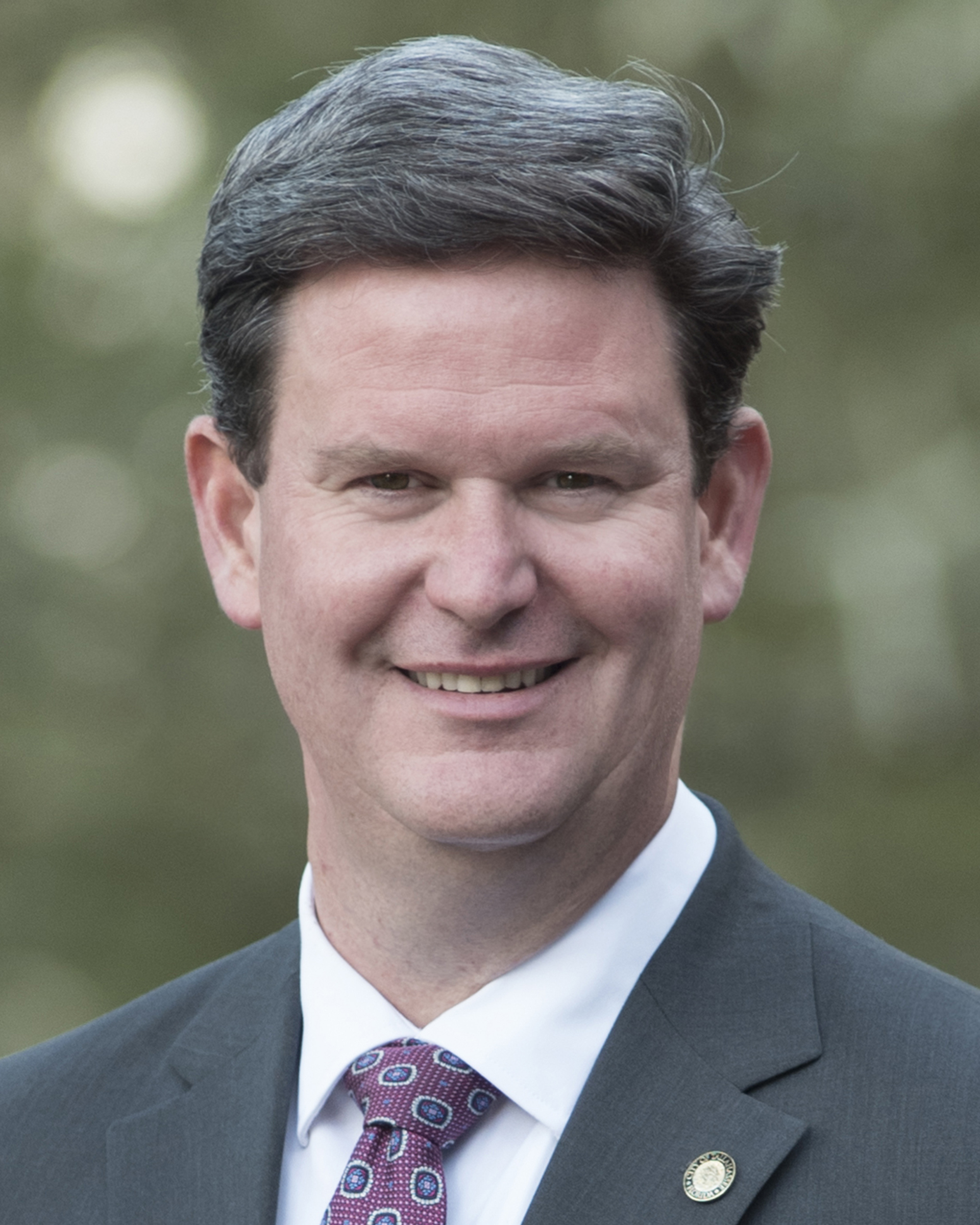
- Incumbent; John E. Dailey since November 19, 2018
- Style: The Honorable
- Term length: 4 years
- Inaugural holder: Charles Haire
- Formation: 1826
- Salary: $80,289

The mayor of Tallahassee is the ceremonial head of the city government of Tallahassee, Florida and the chair of the City Commission. The position was created in 1992 and rotated between members, and eventually became an elected office in 2000 with Scott Maddox as its inaugural holder.

For part of the city's history the office of mayor was a rotating position chosen among city commissioners. Tallahassee switched to the direct election of its mayors in 1997.

== List ==
=== Florida Territory ===
Image	Mayor	Years	Notes
	Charles Haire	1826	was elected Intendant
	David Ochiltree	1827	moved to Florida from Fayetteville, North Carolina. He also served as a justice of the peace. Ochiltree died in 1834 at his residence on Rocky Comfort Creek (Florida). He was a colonel and was a member elect of the Legislative Council of the Territory of Florida for Gadsden County when he died.
	John Y. Garey	1828–1829	He was a justice of the peace and territorial auditor. He was named on the first two issues of treasury notes in 1829 and 1830: "The Territory of Florida promises to pay John Y. Garey or bearer at the Treasury Office..."
	Leslie A. Thompson	1830	
	Charles Austin	1831	
	Leslie A. Thompson (2nd term)	1832–1833	
	Robert J. Hackley	1834	Hackley was a pioneer settler sent by his father to an area by Tampa Bay. He was dispossessed of his land for the establishment of Fort Brooke. A case on behalf of his heirs went to the Supreme Court.
	William Wilson	1835	
	John Rea	1836	
	William P. Gorman	1837	
	William Hilliard	1838	
	R. F. Ker	1839	
	Leslie A. Thompson (3rd term)	1840	
	Francis W. Eppes	1841–1844	

=== Statehood ===
Image	Mayor	Years	Notes
	James A. Berthelot	1845	He also served in the General Assembly and campaigned for another office on a no tax anti bond platform advertised on a poster. He was a mason and part of the Grand Lodge of Florida
	Simon Towle	1846	He was also a state comptroller. Owned the Towle House in Tallahassee, Florida
	James Kirksey	1847	Also delegate to the 1861 Secession Convention of Florida
	F. H. Flagg	1848	
	Thomas James Perkins	1849	
	David Porter Hogue	1850–1851	a lawyer who served as Attorney General in Florida.
	David S. Walker	1852	went on to serve as the eighth Governor of Florida from 1866 to 1868.
	Richard Hayward	1853	
	Thomas Hayward	1854–1855	
	Francis W. Eppes (2nd term)	1856–1857	
	David Porter Hogue (2nd term)	1858–1860	

=== Civil War era and Reconstruction ===
Image	Mayor	Years	Notes
	P. T. Pearce	1861–1865	appointed a trustee of the West Florida Seminary
	Francis W. Eppes (3rd term)	1866	grandson of Thomas Jefferson
	David Porter Hogue (3rd term)	1867–1868	
	Thaddeus Preston Tatum	1869–1870	Tatum was a druggist and served in the Battle of Natural Bridge. Lived September 27, 1835 - July 4, 1873 and is buried in the Old City Cemetery.
	Charles Edgar Dyke	1871	a Conservative newspaper editor of the Floridian & Journal
	C. H. Edwards	1872–1874	
	David S. Walker Jr.	1875	Son of David S. Walker
	Samuel Walker	1876	

=== Post-Reconstruction ===
Image	Mayor	Years	Notes
	Samuel C. Watkins	1876	Council President Watkins served briefly as Acting Mayor making him Tallahassee's first African-American mayor
	Jesse Talbot Bernard	1877	First Democratic mayor after Reconstruction, which ended the year he was elected.
	David S. Walker Jr. (2nd term)	1878–1879	
	Henry Bernreuter	1880	born in Columbus, Georgia to German immigrants, he moved as a child with his family to Florida. He was a Confederate veteran who later served as sheriff and police chief.
	Edward Lewis	1881	
	Charles C. Pearce	1884–1885	
	George W. Walker	1886	
	A. J. Fish	1887	
	Robert B. Gorman	1888–1889	Son of former mayor, William P. Gorman. Served in the Confederate Army and was postmaster in Tallahassee. As mayor, he signed on to a letter from the merchants of Tallahassee to the U.S. Army's Chief of Engineers calling for the St. Marks River to be made navigable to promote trade. In 1889 he reported on negotiations with a Philadelphia, Pennsylvania company for a water works system.
	Richard B. Carpenter	1890–1894	A shopkeeper, he went into bankruptcy and had a legal case for exemption given individuals declaring bankruptcy, even though the firm was established as a separate entity. Decided on appeal in his favor.
	Jesse Talbot Bernard (2nd term)	1895–1896	a teacher and judge who travelled around Florida to hear cases. Served in the Confederate Army.
	R. A. Shine	1897	
	Robert B. Gorman (2nd term)	1898–1902	
	William L. Moor	1903–1904	
	John Ward Henderson	1905	He also served as a legislator.
	Foster Clinton Gilmore	1906	
	William M. McIntosh Jr.	1907	he also served as Chief Clerk of the state's Comptroller Office.
	Foster Clinton Gilmore (2nd term)	1908	
	Francis B. Winthrop	1909	The Florida State Archives have a photo of the family home as well as a photo of Winthrop, age 3. Florida State University has a photo of him in what appears to be a military uniform c. 1918 as well as some of his business documents in a collection of his family's papers. His family owned the Barrow Hill Plantation and a house at 610 North Magnolia, which he lived in with his wife for years.
	Dexter Marvin Lowry	1910–1917	

=== After World War I ===
Image	Mayor	Years	Notes
	J. R. McDaniel	1918	
	Guyte P. McCord	1919–1921	played on the 1904 Florida State College football team and scored a touchdown in the state championship game against Stetson
	A. P. McCaskill	1922–1923	
	Ben A. Meginniss	1924–1925	
	W. Theo Proctor	1926	(b.1892, d.1986)
	Ben A. Meginniss (2nd term)	1927	
	W. Theo Proctor (2nd term)	1928–1929	
	G. E. Lewis	1930	
	Frank D. Moor	1931	
	W. L. Marshall	1932–1933	
	John L. Fain	1934	
	Leonard A. Wesson	1935	
	H. J. Yaeger	1936	(H. Jack Yaeger)
	Leonard A. Wesson (2nd term)	1937	
	J. R. Jinks	1938	
	Samuel A. Wahnish	1939	First Jewish mayor
	Frank D. Moor (2nd term)	1940	
	Charles Saxon Ausley	1941	
	Jack W. Simmons	1942	
	A. R. Richardson	1943	
	Charles Saxon Ausley (2nd term)	1944	
	Ralph E. Proctor	1945	

=== Post-World War II ===
Image	Mayor	Years	Notes
	Fred S. Winterle	1946	He and his son were involved in the oil distribution business.
	George I. Martin	1947	
	Fred N. Lowry	1948	Younger brother of former mayor Dexter Marvin Lowry
	Robert C. Parker	1949–1950	
	William H. Cates	1951	
	B. A. Ragsdale	1952	
	William T. Mayo	1953	
	H. C. Summitt	1954	
	J. T. Williams	1955–1956	Died November 24, 1970
	Fred S. Winterle (2nd term)	1956	
	John Yaeger Humphress	1956–1957	
	J. W. Cordell	1957	
	Davis H. Atkinson	1958	
	Hugh E. Williams Jr.	1959	
	George Stanton Taff	1960	
	J. W. Cordell (2nd term)	1961	
	Davis H. Atkinson	1962	
	Samuel E. Teague Jr.	1963	
	Hugh E. Williams, Jr. (2nd term)	1964	
	George Stanton Taff (2nd term)	1965	
	William Haywood Cates (2nd Term)	1966	Longest-serving city commissioner in history of Tallahassee. In 1971, he was defeated by the first African American elected as commissioner, James R. Ford. His son drowned in a hunting accident. Was a religion professor at Florida State University and helped found religious organizations in Tallahassee.
	John A. Rudd, Sr.	1967	
	Gene Berkowitz	1968	He also served as a City Commissioner in Tallahassee; His wife was a schoolteacher. As a commissioner he voted to reopen the city's pools in the wake of the assassination of Martin Luther King in 1968.
	Spurgeon Camp	1969	
	Lee A. Everhart	1970	founder and president of building company Everhart Construction Company
	Gene Berkowitz (2nd term)	1971	
	James R. Ford	1972	First African-American mayor since Reconstruction when City Council president Samuel C. Watkins briefly served as mayor in 1876
	Joan Heggen	1973	First female mayor
	Russell R. Bevis	1974	
	Earl Yancey	1974	His wife Lucy was the granddaughter of Florida politician Robert Flournoy Hosford.
	Johnny Jones	1975	
	James R. Ford (2nd term)	1976	
	Ben W. Thompson	1977	Was a lawyer and graduate of FSU and Stetson Law School. After leaving Tallahassee, he went to Boulder, CO in 1982 and continued his legal practice. He ran for Boulder County District Attorney in 2000 after the JonBenét Ramsey murder case. He published two books: M'Naghten Rules: A Novel Inspired by True Events About Insanity in The First Degree (2007, ISBN 978-1-4120-7432-2) and Butch Cassidy's Lase Campfire (2017, ISBN 978-1-947247-68-0)
	Neal D. Sapp	1978	He was a paratrooper in the U.S. Army and graduated from Florida State University. He was a software developer and businessman. He died March 26, 2004.
	Sheldon E. Hilaman	1979	Former school principal. Known as "Shad". Hillaman Golf Course is named for him.
	Richard P. Wilson	1980	
	Hurley Rudd	1981	also served as a city commissioner and multiple terms in the Florida legislature
	James R. Ford (3rd term)	1982	
	Carol Bellamy	1983	
	Kent Spriggs	1984	Civil Rights lawyer who also edited a book about Civil Rights leaders in the deep south. Appeared on C-SPAN while mayor discussing his duties.
	Hurley Rudd (2nd term)	1985	
	Jack L. McLean Jr.	1986	Third African-American mayor
	Betty Harley	1987	
	Frank Visconti	1988	
	Dorothy Inman-Crews	1989	First female African-American mayor
	Steve Meisberg	1990	
	Debbie Lightsey	1991	
	Bob Hightower	1992	
	Dorothy Inman-Crews (2nd term)	1993	
	Penny Herman	1994	
	Scott Maddox	1995	
	Ron Weaver	1996	Fifth African American mayor
	Scott Maddox (2nd term)	1997–2003	first directly elected mayor
	John Marks	2003–2014	
	Andrew Gillum	2014–2018	Ran for governor in 2018 but lost narrowly to Ron DeSantis
	John E. Dailey	2018–2026	Served 2 terms. Declined to seek re-election. Prior to City service, he served on the Leon County Commission.
Jeremy Matlow	Jeremy A. Matlow	(Mayor-elect) 2026-present	Previously served 2 terms at City Commissioner (2018-2026)

== See also ==
- Timeline of Tallahassee, Florida
