= History of Tallahassee, Florida =

The history of Tallahassee, Florida, much like the history of Leon County, dates back to the settlement of the Americas. Beginning in the 16th century, the region was colonized by Europeans, becoming part of Spanish Florida. In 1819, the Adams–Onís Treaty ceded Spanish Florida, including modern-day Tallahassee, to the United States. Tallahassee became a city and the state capital of Florida in 1821; the American takeover led to the settlements' rapid expansion as growing numbers of cotton plantations began to spring up nearby, increasing Tallahassees' population significantly.

== Early history ==
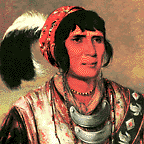
Osceola

Tallahassee is situated within the Apalachee Province, home of the Apalachee, a Mississippian culture of agrarian people who farmed vast tracts of land. Their capital, Anhaica, was located within Tallahassee's city limits.

The name "Tallahassee" is a Muskogean Indian word often translated as "old fields", or "old town." Its also known as "Tally" as a nickname. This may stem from the Creek (later called Seminole) Indians that migrated into this region in the 18th century. The Apalachee's success as agriculturalists did not go unnoticed by the Spanish, who sent missionaries to the area throughout the 17th century. Several mission sites were established with the aim of procuring food and labor for the colony at St. Augustine. One of the most important mission sites, Mission San Luis de Apalachee, has been partially reconstructed as a state historic site in Tallahassee.

== Spanish period (16th century to 1821) ==
The Spanish missionaries were not the first Europeans to visit Tallahassee. The Spanish explorer, Hernando de Soto spent the winter of 1538-1539 encamped at the Apalachee village of Anhaica, which he had taken by force. De Soto's brutal treatment of the natives was fiercely resisted, and by the following spring De Soto was eager to move on. The site of Anhaica, near present-day Myers Park, was located in 1987 by Florida archaeologist B. Calvin Jones.

Anhaica, in the early period of Spanish colonization, was the capital of the Apalachee Province (of Spanish Florida).

It was burned on March 31, 1818, by General Andrew Jackson, at the onset of the First Seminole War.

== 19th century ==
=== Becoming capital ===
The founding of Tallahassee was largely a matter of convenience. In 1821, Florida was ceded by Spain to the United States. A territorial government was established, but the impracticalities of alternately meeting in St. Augustine and Pensacola, the two largest cities in the territory at the time (the Spaniards had built a road), led territorial governor William Pope Duval to appoint two commissioners to establish a more central meeting place.

In October 1823, John Lee Williams of Pensacola and Dr. William Simmons of St. Augustine selected the former Indian settlement of Tallahassee, roughly midway between the two cities, as a suitable place. Their decision was also based on its elevation and location near a beautiful waterfall, now part of Cascades Park, and the old capital of the Apalachee chiefdom, Anhaica, burned by Andrew Jackson in 1818. Neamathla, a Creek chief, was living there in a new town called Cohowofooche.

In March of the following year it was formally proclaimed the capital. Florida did not become a state, however, until 1845.

On November 1, 1823, John Lee Williams wrote to Florida congressional delegate (and later governor) Richard Keith Call about the location of the capital:

Doct. Simmons has agreed that the Site should be fixed near the old fields abandoned by the Indians after Jackson's invasion, but has not yet determined whether between the... old fields, or on a fine high lawn about a mile W. In both spots the water is plenty and good.

=== Founding of Tallahassee ===
In 1824, the City of Tallahassee, the county seat and only incorporated city in Leon County, was established following a decision by the state legislature to locate the capital of the new Florida Territory midway between the population centers of St. Augustine and Pensacola. The city was not formally incorporated until December 1825, with the first municipal elections being held in January 1826.

In 1824, General Marquis de Lafayette was awarded a land grant by the United States Congress. The grant consisted of a 6-mile (9.7 km) by 6-mile (9.7 km) square of land in what is today mostly northeast Tallahassee. Although the Marquis never visited his property in Florida, he sent people to grow limes and olives and to produce silk from moths. However, the colony failed, and most of the residents went to New Orleans or back to France. Those who remained lived in an area of Tallahassee that still is called Frenchtown. Lafayette eventually sold his property.

In 1826, Achille Murat, nephew of Napoleon Bonaparte, moved to the Tallahassee area, most likely in response to the July 4, 1825 Lafayette Land Grant, which also attracted many other French settlers. He purchased land in Jefferson County, Florida and named it Lipona Plantation. "Lipona" is an anagram for Napoli, the Italian spelling of Naples, Italy, where he was to rule.

The following outline represents a brief historical sketch of the area:

In 1827, Ralph Waldo Emerson, after a visit, called Tallahassee "A grotesque place of land speculators and desperados." Emerson would become a great friend and confidant of the aforementioned Achille Murat for years.

=== 1830s ===
==== First bank ====
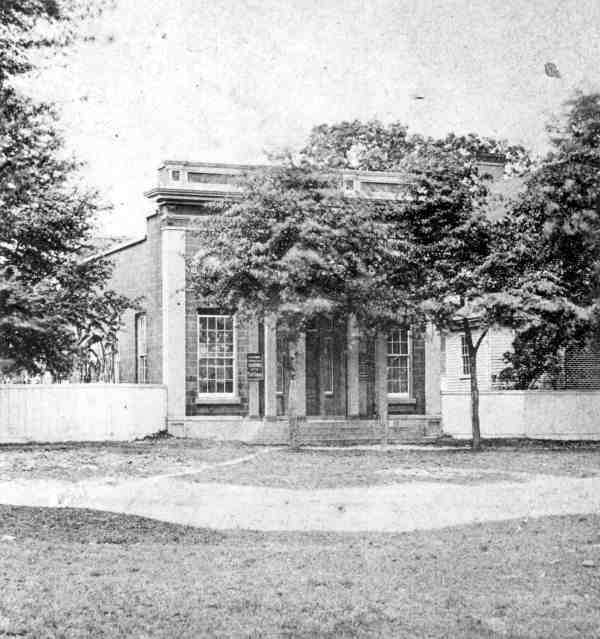
Union Bank of Tallahassee

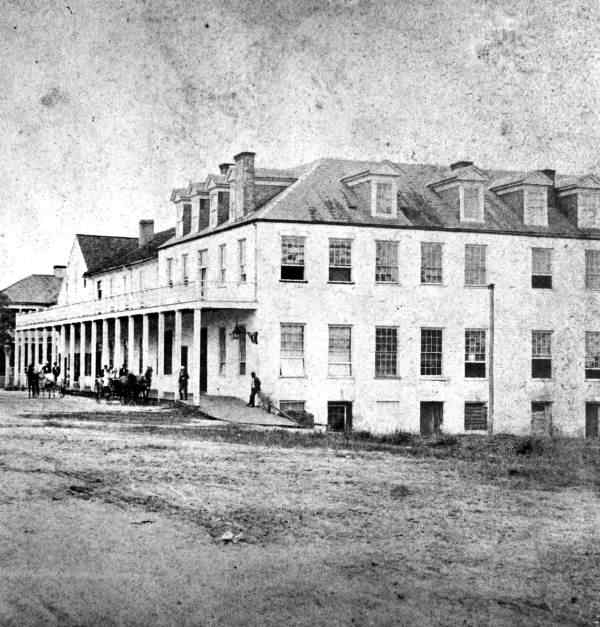
Brown's Inn in 1834.

Around 1830, the Union Bank, Tallahassee's first bank, was established by William Williams. The Seminole Wars, unsound banking practices, and the Panic of 1837 caused the closing of the bank in 1843. In 1847, the bank was purchased by cotton plantation owners William Bailey and Issac Mitchell. It later became a Freedman (negro) bank from after the Civil War until 1879. The building has been used as a church, feed store, art house, coffee house, dance studio, locksmith's shop, beauty shop, and shoe factory. In 1971 the bank was moved from the original site on the west side of Adams Street, between College Avenue and Park Avenue, to just east of the Capitol on Apalachee Parkway and Calhoun Avenue.

==== Capitol building ====
The rough hewn frontier capital gradually grew into a town during Florida's territorial period. In anticipation of becoming a state, the territorial government erected a Greek Revival masonry structure that would befit a state capitol. The structure opened in 1845 in time for statehood and eventually become known as the "old Capitol" which stands in front of the current new capitol high rise today.

==== Tallahassee-St. Marks Railroad ====
In 1834, the Tallahassee Railroad was constructed, connecting St. Marks with Tallahassee to facilitate shipping of cotton to northeastern ports. It is reported to be the third oldest railroad in the United States. Three years later, it was extended to Port Leon, briefly the county seat of Wakulla County until it was destroyed by hurricane. In 1856 the mule-drawn line, with wooden rails, was replaced with steel rails and steam locomotives. The route has been paved and is today the Tallahassee-St. Marks Historic Railroad State Trail.

Also in 1834, Thomas Brown, who would later serve as Florida's governor, built an inn called Brown's Inn, located on the west side of Adams Street between Pensacola and Lafayette streets.

=== 1840s ===
The Floridian newspaper reported in 1840 that the Great Florida Mail route ("previously sent by the Alligator Route") connected Tallahassee (Port Leon), via steamboats and stagecoaches, with Apalachcola, Pensacola, and Mobile, Alabama to the west, and St. Augustine, Brunswick, Georgia, and Charleston, South Carolina on the east. The trip from Mobile was 3 1/2 days "in favorable weather", and the fare $26.50.

==== Reform mayor ====
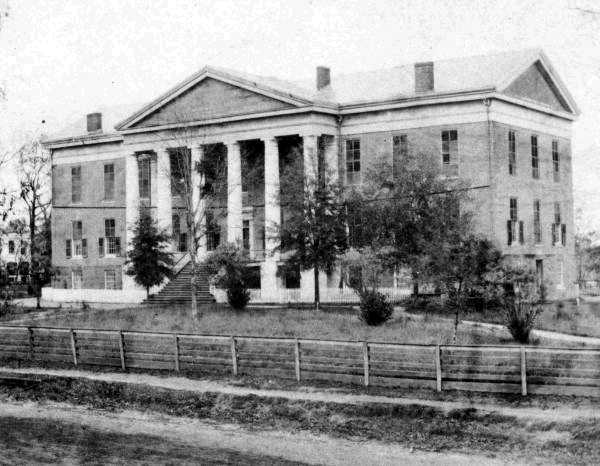
Florida Capitol Building 1845

In 1841, Francis W. Eppes, grandson of Thomas Jefferson and a successful cotton plantation owner became Intendant mayor of Tallahassee. Eppes served as mayor until 1844. Eppes described the town's Marion Race Course "A hotbed of vice, intemperance, gambling and profanity." He held that the rest of the town was little better. Eppes would again serve from 1856 to 1857.

=== 1850s ===
During the antebellum period, Tallahassee was at the center of the fast-growing "middle counties" of Florida, which held the bulk of the antebellum state population. For several decades before the Civil War, nearby Gadsden County was the most populous in the state. Cotton and tobacco plantations and smaller farms were the main draw for population growth as well as economic and political power. Many cotton plantations such as the William Bailey Plantation, Barrow Hill, Francis Eppes Plantation, La Grange Plantation were built within what is now Tallahassee.

=== 1860s ===
==== Civil War ====
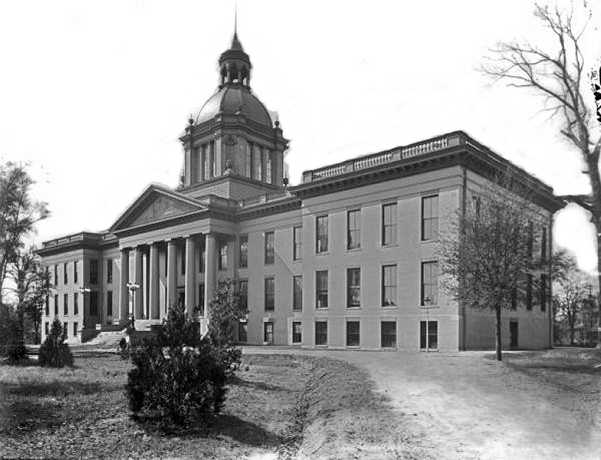
Florida Capitol Building c. 1902

Tallahassee was the only Confederate state capital east of the Mississippi not captured by Union forces during the Civil War, and the only one not burned. The Battle of Natural Bridge was fought outside Tallahassee. The FSU ROTC has the rare privilege of displaying a Civil War battle streamer, due to participation in that battle by volunteers that included teenagers from the nearby Florida Military and Collegiate Institute (that would later become Florida State University).

Leon County produced two companies who fought as part of the 1st Florida Infantry Regiment. One of the companies, dubbed the "Leon Artillery," was reportedly made up of "Tallahassee boys, young, healthy, and many of them wealthy."

=== Reconstruction ===
Following the Civil War, much of Florida's industry shifted to the south and east, a trend that continues to this day. After the abolition of slavery, regional industries which previously relied on forced labor, like cotton and tobacco, began to decline. Consequently, the state's primary industries transitioned to citrus, naval stores, cattle ranching, and tourism, mainly to the south and east due to favorable climate and geography. This growth was particularly evident around the Jacksonville area and along the St. Johns River.

At the same time, newly liberated African Americans established Frenchtown, the oldest historically black neighborhood in the state.

=== 1880s ===
==== First university ====
In January 1883 Reverend John Kost, A.M., M.D., LL.D of Michigan proposed to carry out the mandate of the 1868 Constitution requiring a state university. Kost selected Tallahassee and the West Florida Seminary for the location of the university. The university was called the Florida State College for Women and later called the Florida State University.

On October 3, 1887, the State Normal College for Colored Students began classes, and became a land grant university four years later when it received $7,500 under the Second Morrill Act, and its name was changed to State Normal and Industrial College for Colored Students. However, it was not an official institution of higher learning until the 1905 Buckman Act, which transferred control from the Department of Education to the Board of Control, creating what was the foundation for the modern Florida A&M University.

==== Capital City Bank ====
Dry goods store owner George W. Saxon began making loans to farmers during the 1880s which led him to filing for a bank charter in 1895. The bank grew and by 1975, Saxon's great-grandson and bank director, DuBose Ausley, began formation of several banks into one group. Capital City Bank now has 70 banking offices and serves people as far north as Valley, Alabama and Macon, Georgia to Port Richey, Florida in the south.

==== Carrabelle, Tallahassee and Georgia Railroad ====
During the 1880s and 1890s Tallahassee was served by the Carrabelle, Tallahassee and Georgia Railroad, which ran from Georgia to Tallahassee and on to Carrabelle in Franklin County.

==== St. James and Leon Hotels ====
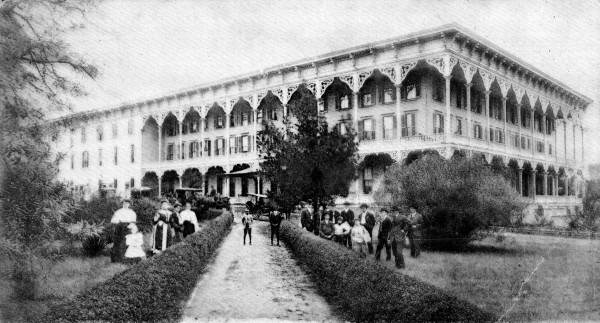
Leon Hotel, 1910

The St. James Hotel was constructed sometime during the 1870—1883 period. It was a 3-story hotel with a porch wrapping two sides, located on the corner Monroe Street and Jefferson Street. The St. James became the Bloxham House from 1909 to 1913. Moved to 410 N. Calhoun Street, this building possesses both local and statewide significance, having served as the residence for Governors William D. Bloxham and Madison S. Perry from 1881 to 1901. It is also Tallahassee's finest remaining example of Federal residential architecture. In 1980 the Florida Heritage Foundation oversaw the restoration of this building.

In 1881, the Leon Hotel was constructed at 110 East Park Avenue. A Victorian style 2-story building, it had ornate porches on both first and second floors with sprawling grounds. The Leon was destroyed by fire in 1925.

== 20th century ==
Throughout much of the 20th century, Tallahassee remained a sleepy government and college town, where politicians would meet to discuss spending money on grand public improvement projects to accommodate growth in places such as Miami and Tampa, hundreds of miles away from the capital. By 1901, the infrastructure development continued to trend growth to the south, first by the Plant System Railroads to the fledgling port of Tampa and then the Flagler railroad to the remote outpost of Miami. However, Tallahassee was firmly entrenched as capital and in that year the 1845 capitol building was expanded with two new wings, and a small dome.

=== 1900 to 1930 ===
In 1905, Florida State College became a women's school called the Florida Female College and, in 1909, the name of the college was changed to Florida State College for Women.

In 1919, The Florida Legislature passed a new city charter for Tallahassee, authorizing a Commission-Manager form of government. The position of directly elected mayor ended and a system of rotation among city commissioners for mayor began.

The Floridan Hotel was constructed opened May 2, 1927, on the corner of Monroe Street and Call Street. It became the home of state legislators during legislative sessions and it has been said that more of Florida's business took place in the Floridan than in the Florida Capitol. The Tallahassee Rotary Club met in the Floridan during this decade. The Floridan was demolished in 1985. The 4-story Cherokee Hotel was constructed in 1922 at Park Ave and Calhoun St.

In 1928, the City of Tallahassee purchased a 200-acre (0.81 km^{2}) tract of land for $7,028 for its first municipal airport. It was named Dale Mabry Field in honor of Tallahassee native Army Captain Dale Mabry. The airport was dedicated on November 11, 1929, with its first manager being Ivan Munroe.

=== 1930 to 1950 ===
In 1931, the Lively Vocational Technical School was established and is still in existence on Appleyard Drive.

In 1947, the legislature returned Florida State College for Women to coeducational status, founding the Florida State University.

Musician and entertainer Ray Charles made Tallahassee his part-time home. Charles began sitting in with the Florida A&M University student band and playing with jazz brothers Nat Adderley and Cannonball Adderley.

=== 1950s ===
==== Tallahassee bus boycott ====
Reverend C. K. Steele and Edwin Norwood

On May 26, 1956, two Florida A&M University students were arrested by the Tallahassee Police Department because they refused to give up their seats next to a white passenger. They were charged with "inciting a riot", though the white woman they sat next to made no objection. The next night a cross was burned outside their rooming house. Carrie Patterson, a FAMU junior, was a 21-year-old wife and mother from the small town of Lakeland, Florida. She was able to return home just twice a year. Wilhemina Jakes, a FAMU senior, was a 26-year-old born in Hardeeville, South Carolina and was from West Palm Beach, Florida. Both young women were studying elementary education at FAMU.

Rev. C. K. Steele and Robert Saunders representing the NAACP began talks while blacks started boycotting the city's buses. This boycott was similar to that in the Montgomery bus boycott with Rosa Parks. Former bus patrons began a car pool lasting through May 26, 1957, several other events took place which would change segregation in Tallahassee. The Inter-Civic Council ended the boycott on December 3, 1956.

On January 7, 1957, the City Commission repealed the bus-franchise segregation clause because of a recent federal ruling that outlaws segregated buses in Florida. Tallahassee's bus terminal would later be named after Steele.

In 1959, Betty Jean Owens, an African-American woman, was brutally raped by four white men in Tallahassee. The trial of Owens' rapists was significant in Florida, and the South as a whole, because the white men were given life sentences for their crimes. This severe of a sentencing had not occurred for white men in the South accused of raping black women previous to Owens' case.

=== 1960s ===
==== Civil Rights Protests ====
On March 16, 1960, the Tallahassee Police Department used tear gas to break up a student protest demonstration in the city. Protesters also attempted a boycott of The Mecca, a popular eatery across from the gate of Florida State University. In 1963, orchestra leader Count Basie was refused service at the restaurant after performing at Florida State, which precipitated a protest in which Basie participated. Similar protests were launched against McCrory's, Woolworth's, Walgreens, and Sears. (For more information, see below, History of Tallahassee, Florida#Black history.)

=== The new capitol building ===
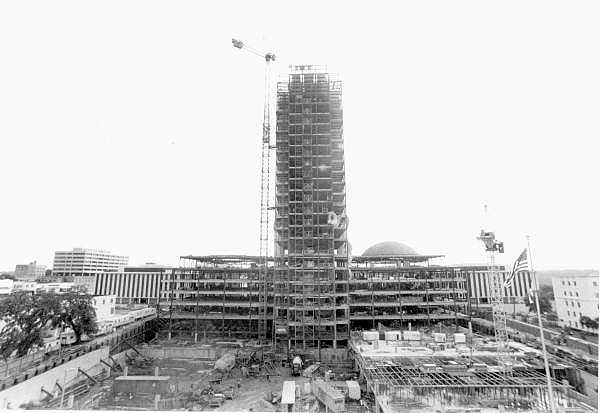
Florida Capitol Building under construction

By the 1960s, there was a movement to move the capital to Orlando closer geographically to the growing population centers of the state. That motion was defeated however, and the 1970s saw a long-term commitment by the state to the capital city with construction of the new capitol complex and preservation of the old capitol building. In 1961, Tallahassee Regional Airport is opened.

=== First subdivision ===
In 1964, Killearn Estates became Tallahassee's first planned community. Formed from land owned by the Coble family and known as Velda Farms, it was unusual in that it had underground utilities preserving a natural appearance.

=== Tallahassee Community College ===
In 1966, The Tallahassee Community College was established just west of what was Dale Mabry Field. TCC would grow and educate over 14,000 students per semester.

=== 1970s ===
==== Ted Bundy ====
On January 9, 1978, serial killer Ted Bundy arrived in Tallahassee from Atlanta by bus. While in Tallahassee, Bundy rented a room at a boarding house under the alias of "Chris Hagen". Bundy went on a spree committing numerous petty crimes including shoplifting, purse snatching, and auto theft. In the early hours of Super Bowl Sunday on January 15, 1978, he bludgeoned to death two sleeping women, Lisa Levy and Margaret Bowman, and seriously wounded Karen Chandler and Kathry Kleiner inside their Florida State University Chi Omega sorority house. He then clubbed and severely injured another young woman, Cheryl Thomas, in her home a few blocks away.

On February 15, Bundy stole an orange VW Bug belonging to Rick Garzaniti of Tallahassee. Bundy was stopped shortly after 1 a.m. by Pensacola police officer David Lee. When the officer called in a check of Bundy's license plate it was proven to be stolen. Bundy scuffled with Lee before finally being subdued.

Bundy was found guilty of these and other murders and was executed January 24, 1989.

== Recent history ==
Tallahassee has seen an uptick in growth in recent years, mainly in government and research services associated with the state and Florida State University. However, a growing number of retirees are finding Tallahassee an attractive alternative to South Florida's high housing prices and urban sprawl.

=== 1990s ===
In 1993, the Leon County Public Library was renamed the LeRoy Collins Leon County Public Library in honor of Florida's 33rd Governor, LeRoy Collins. In 1997, Tallahassee citizens selected Scott Maddox as their first directly elected mayor since 1919.

=== 2000s ===
The U.S. presidential election of 2000 between Al Gore and George W. Bush would play out to a great degree in Tallahassee. Bush won the election night vote count in Florida by a little over 1000 votes. Florida state law provided for an automatic recount due to the small margins.

The closeness of the election was clear and both the Bush and Gore campaigns organized themselves for the ensuing legal process. The Bush campaign hired George H. W. Bush's former Secretary of State James Baker to oversee their legal team, and the Gore campaign hired Bill Clinton's former Secretary of State Warren Christopher and Tallahassee attorneys W. Dexter Douglass and John Newton.

The Gore campaign, as allowed by Florida statute, requested that disputed ballots in four counties be counted by hand. Florida statutes also required that all counties certify and report their returns, including any recounts, by 5 p.m. on November 14.

At 4:00 p.m. EST on December 8, the Florida Supreme Court, by a 4 to 3 vote, ordered a manual recount, under the supervision of the Leon County Circuit Court, of disputed ballots in all Florida counties and the portion of Miami-Dade county in which such a recount was not already complete. That decision was announced on live worldwide television by the Florida Supreme Court's spokesman Craig Waters, the Court's public information officer. The Court further ordered that only undervotes be considered. The results of this tally were to be added to the November 14 tally. This count was in progress on December 9 at the LeRoy Collins Leon County Public Library, when the United States Supreme Court 5-4 (Justices Stevens, Souter, Ginsburg and Breyer dissenting) granted Bush's emergency plea for a stay of the Florida Supreme Court recount ruling, stopping the incomplete recount.

=== 2010s ===
In 2016, Hurricane Hermine swept through the city, knocking out power to 80% of the city, including Florida State University, and bringing down trees. This was the first hurricane to make a direct hit on the city since Hurricane Kate in 1985.

== Black history ==
=== Segregation followed as one of the results of Slavery ===
Tallahassee has a strong black history. Before the Civil War Leon County led the state in cotton production, and had the greatest cluster of plantations in the state. (See Plantations of Leon County.) Centrally located Tallahassee—only north Florida had any significant population—was the center of Florida's slave trade. In 1860, Leon County's population was 73% black, almost all of them slaves; there were more slaves in Leon County than in any other county in Florida. (Adjacent Gadsden County is according to the 2010 census the only county in Florida with a majority African-American population.) In addition, and the two facts are loosely linked, it is the site of the state's largest and only public historically black institution of higher education, Florida A&M University, founded in 1877 as the State Normal (four years later, Normal and Industrial) College for Colored Students. (Legislation leading to its creation was introduced by former abolitionist and Superintendent of Public Instruction Jonathan C. Gibbs, who was elected a Tallahassee city councilman in 1872.) According to the 2010 Census, Tallahassee's population was 34% black, whereas Florida as a whole is 17% black. A commemoration of the Emancipation Proclamation is celebrated on May 20 of each year, at the Knott House (run by the Museum of Florida History), where the proclamation was read on May 20, 1865.

Tallahassee is the location of the John G. Riley Center/Museum of African American History & Culture (John Gilmore Riley House), and the Carrie Meek and James N. Eaton Sr., Southeastern Regional Black Archives Research Center and Museum.

Like other Southern cities, Tallahassee was segregated from the end of Reconstruction until the early 1970s; the closing of the underfunded Florida A&M Hospital in 1971 is a good marking point for the end of segregation in Tallahassee. Tallahassee's rigid segregation led to its nickname of "Little Mississippi", and racism in pre-integration Tallahassee has been described as "virulent". Real estate deeds in white neighborhoods were typically accompanied by covenants prohibiting sale to blacks (see Shelley v. Kraemer). Tallahassee turned down Andrew Carnegie's offer of a grant to build a library, because under Carnegie's rules it would have to serve black patrons. (Carnegie, faced with this, instead built in 1907 the Carnegie Library on the campus of what is now Florida A&M University. Tallahassee's former whites-only public library is today the David S. Walker Library.)

Schools, buses, churches, stores, movie theaters, hospitals, parks, even cemeteries were also segregated. (Greenwood was the negro cemetery.) There was a Colored Hook and Ladder Company (fire department); the city fire department, because of "insufficient hoses", did not respond to the fire that destroyed the Lincoln Academy in 1872. The local newspaper, the Tallahassee Democrat, had a regular black section in the paper. White subscribers received in its place the business section.

=== Frenchtown ===
After the Civil War, many newly free blacks settled in the area that came to be known as Frenchtown (because it was on part of the Lafayette Land Grant). It occupied relatively undesirable, low-lying land to the northwest of the Capitol, the downtown, and the Governor's Mansion; the latter is only two blocks from Macomb Street, Frenchtown's commercial center. Although today the southern border of Frenchtown is Tennessee Street, it previously extended to Park Avenue, including land currently occupied by the LeRoy Collins Leon County Public Library. Frenchtown is the oldest historically black neighborhood in the state.

By the twentieth century Frenchtown had its own stores, doctors, pharmacy, schools, restaurants, nightclubs, and (on Tennessee Street) a movie theater. When James Baldwin visited to read some of his work at FAMU, he stayed at (and could only stay at) the Tookes Hotel. Frenchtown was a stop on the Chitlin' Circuit, and famous black musicians like Louis Armstrong, B. B. King, Ray Charles, Cab Calloway, Little Richard, Little Milton, Al Green, Lou Rawls, and Nat and Cannonball Adderley performed there; in the 1940s Ray Charles and the Adderley brothers lived there. All the businesses and night clubs on the western side of Macomb Street were torn down when it was widened around 1990. Macomb Street, together with Old Bainbridge Road, which starts where Macomb ends, was until 1949, when U.S. 90 was built from Tallahassee to Quincy, the main route out of Tallahassee to the west.

The community was served by the Lincoln Academy, then Lincoln High School (see Old Lincoln High School), the first school to serve blacks in Leon County and one of three in the state providing secondary education to African Americans. (President Abraham Lincoln was a hero for blacks, but was hated by segregationist whites.) Its first principal was John G. Riley (see John Gilmore Riley House), who had been born a slave, and who was head of the local chapter of the National Association for the Advancement of Colored People. Its final building (the fourth; two destroyed by fire) was located on Brevard Street, but facing the length of Macomb Street. It closed in 1969, when black students were admitted to previously all-white Leon High School. As often happened during desegregation, and as also happened with the Florida A&M University College of Law and the Florida A&M Hospital, desegregation meant that the black facility was closed and most of the black teachers, principals, and coaches lost their jobs. The building, today called the Lincoln Center, is used for delivering social services. There is no connection with the current, distant Lincoln High School.

A bus line ran south from Frenchtown to Florida A&M University, where, along South Adams Street, there was a second, smaller group of black businesses. Though enlarged at the north end, this survives as the Moss route.

Until the extension of Colorado St. about 1990, Frenchtown had no direct link to the white neighborhoods to its north.

=== Desegregation ===
A bus boycott in 1956, inspired by and the first to follow that of Montgomery, Alabama, led (after cross burnings and violence) to integrated seating in 1957. This successful boycott informed the desegregation of the Miami Transit Company in 1957.

The bus boycott was a shock to Tallahassee whites, who believed the city "had been blessed with two staples of Southern mythology, contented blacks and 'good race relations'". It marks the beginning of the Civil Rights Movement and desegregation in Florida.

Fifty years later, the Tallahassee Democrat apologized for the segregationist perspective with which it covered the boycott.

In 1960, in imitation of the nationally famous Greensboro sit-ins at a Woolworth's lunch counter in Greensboro, North Carolina, black students and sympathizers held a series of sit-ins at the lunch counter of the Tallahassee Woolworth's. At least one white student from FSU was expelled for participating. The sit-ins were unsuccessful (Woolworth's desegregated nationally in 1962), and helped segregationist governor Farris Bryant win election later in 1960.

As a result of picketing and sit-ins organised by the local chapter of CORE, by 1963 lunch counters at Sears, Neisner's, Walgreens, McCrory's, and Woolworth's agreed to serve all patrons, the two bus stations were desegregated, as was the municipal courtroom, and the airport restaurant became open to everyone.

On May 30, 1963, 220 pro-integration demonstrators, mostly FAMU students, were arrested for demonstrating in front of Tallahassee's Florida and State Theatres. Later the same day, 100 students marching in sympathy for the first group were met by city, county, and state policemen with tear gas, and 37 were arrested. Charges were later dismissed. At some of the demonstrations there were white segregationist counter-demonstrators, carrying signs saying "Darkies Back to Africa" and "The South Will Rise Again".

Under pressure from Medicare, which refused to fund segregated hospitals, Tallahassee Memorial Hospital in the late 1960s started accepting black patients, and the Florida A&M Hospital, with lesser facilities and with no white patients to replace the black patients it lost, closed. The building is today (2020) the administration building at Florida A&M University.

As elsewhere, the hardest part of the struggle for integration in Tallahassee concerned the school system. Despite the unanimous Supreme Court ruling in Brown v. Board of Education (1954) that racially segregated schools were unconstitutional, and a court statement in 1955 that compliance with the decision should take place "with all deliberate speed" (Brown II), no schools in Florida were desegregated until 1959 (and only one school, in Miami, was integrated that year). Many Floridians viewed Brown v. Board of Education as "a day of catastrophe — a Black Monday — a day something like Pearl Harbor". Although the desegregation process in Florida brought less violence and upheaval than in other Southern states, Florida counties resisted integration "by every means", and local lawsuits in federal courts, on a county by county basis, were necessary for integration to take place. Leon County "fought school integration as tenaciously as any community in Florida". Florida schools were not fully desegregated until the late 1960s, and in Tallahassee, only after the "dyed-in-the-wool segregationists", as school Superintendent Freeman Ashmore called them, had decamped for three newly founded segregation academies: Maclay School, North Florida Christian High School, and Maranatha Christian Academy (closed). Governor LeRoy Collins (1955–1961) supported (gradual) school desegregation—the first Southern official to do so—but the legislature passed a resolution declaring Brown v. Board of Education "null and void", as a federal imposition on states' rights. "By the time Collins left office in 1961, Tallahassee, like most of Florida, remained committed to preserving a segregated school system."

The Florida legislature, in an apparent response to the pressures for integration and to FAMU students' activism, in 1965 defunded the Florida A&M University College of Law, which soon closed, and set up a new one at FSU the following year.

Governor Bob Graham (1979–1987) spoke repeatedly in favor of the merging of Florida A&M University with the formerly all-white Florida State University, which admitted its first African-American student in 1962. Merger was discussed in the Education Committee of several legislative sessions. Loud and anguished voices from the black community led to this proposal being scrapped. The Florida Board of Regents tried another approach to achieving integration by deciding (1985) to locate a new pharmacy school at FAMU rather than FSU. As a step toward integration this also failed, as the school remained a primarily white enclave on the otherwise black campus. The Florida A&M University – Florida State University College of Engineering was founded as a joint venture of the two universities (and located, roughly, between them.)

=== After integration ===
Tallahassee has achieved a remarkable attitudinal change. It has gone from arguably the most racist city in the state—and Florida from 1900 to 1930 led the country in lynchings per capita—to one of the most tolerant.

Primarily this has been driven by the expansion of Florida State University, founded in 1947, to serve World War II veterans studying under the G.I. Bill. Its predecessor, Florida State College for Women, was politically liberal and pro-integration, but it was small and its faculty and graduates had little political power. Secondarily, Tallahassee's change has been due to Florida A&M University, and to the changing demographics of the state itself. Florida's population growth has been due to in-migration. An African American, James R. Ford, was elected mayor in 1972 and was twice re-elected, serving until 1986. He was previously head of the Leon County School System. In 1982, Tallahassee elected Alfred Lawson Jr. to the Florida House of Representatives, where he served until 2000. A resident writing in 1986, who mentions these two facts, described racial tensions as "mild". Subsequently, Alan B. Williams was elected to the House, and Lawson to the Florida Senate.

== See also ==
- Timeline of Tallahassee, Florida
- Florida State Capitol
- History of Leon County, Florida
- Nene (trail)
- Plantations of Leon County
