= History of Leon County, Florida =

The history of Leon County, Florida, much like the History of Tallahassee, dates back to the settlement of the Americas. Beginning in the 16th century, the region was colonized by Europeans, becoming part of Spanish Florida. In 1819, the Adams–Onís Treaty ceded Spanish Florida, including modern-day Leon County, to the United States. Named for Spanish explorer Juan Ponce de León, Leon County became an official U.S. county in 1824; the American takeover led to the county's rapid expansion as growing numbers of cotton plantations began to spring up nearby, increasing Leon County's population significantly.

== Prehistoric ==
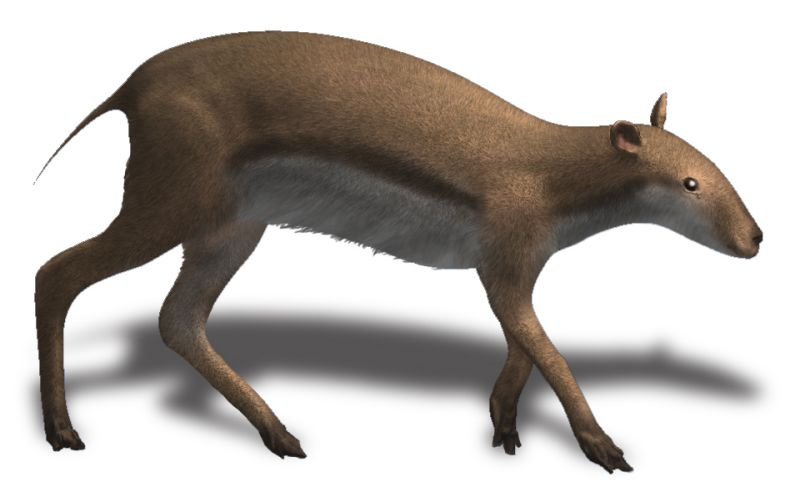
Leptomeryx lived in Florida 23—15 Ma

Leon County, like most of North America, supported a variety of ancient and now extinct animals as far back as 33 million years ago. There are no fossils of dinosaurs in Florida. Prior to the Miocene, Florida was a submerged carbonate platform essentially cut off from the continent by the Gulf Trough. When this trough filled with sediments during the Eocene—Miocene, the carbonate Florida Platform collected sediments and became exposed allowing flora and fauna to take hold. Proto dogs and bear-dogs, along with large cats and other carnivores migrated to the peninsula following their prey of ancient ruminants and deer-like mammals.

- See: Leon County, Florida paleontological sites.

=== Early human habitation ===
Florida's human occupation, as with that of America, are divided into Paleoindian, Archaic, Woodland, Mississippian, and Protohistoric periods. Exceptions are the Protohistoric period, the others are often divided into Early, Middle and Late subperiods and further divided by the term "culture" within the subperiods.

What is now Leon County was occupied by Paleoindians or Clovis culture 12,000 years ago (Upper Paleolithic period). These hunter-gatherer tribes lived in what is now Leon County near water sources where water was shared with animals which outlived many of the aforementioned predators. Animals such as Ancient bison, Mastodon, Ice Age camel, Giant ground sloth, Saber-toothed Tiger, Columbian Mammoth, Equus, Short-faced bear, and American lion would frequent these areas.

=== Archaic period ===
The Archaic cultures (10,000-2500 BCE), are divided into Early, Middle, and Late for the southeastern North America and can be described as having a more humid climate. Sea level rose rapidly and water tables and ecosystems looked much like that of today. Population increased and people began settling in smaller territorial areas. People began using forms of triangular-shaped projectile points and it is thought that Indians switched from hand held spears to spear throwers to more easily bring down game, which for the most part, were the same species as contemporary animals. The cumulative effects of these changes led to increased regionalization as native peoples began adapting to specific local resources. In the Apalachee region this period is also known as the Norwood culture.

=== Woodland period ===
The Woodland period (2500 BCE-900 CE) is divided up fundamentally into the Deptford culture (2500 BCE-100 CE), Swift Creek culture (100-300 CE), Santa Rosa-Swift Creek culture (100-300 CE), and Weeden Island culture (300-900 CE) cultures. It is characterized by and widespread use of pottery (and tempering agents) which began in the late Archaic period. Also, the increasing sophistication of pottery forms and decoration began. The increasing use of agriculture also meant that the nomadic nature of many of the tribes was supplanted by permanently occupied villages, although agricultural development did not really advance until the Mississippian period. Burial of the deceased in mounds with elaborate grave goods also began.

- Also see: Woodland period

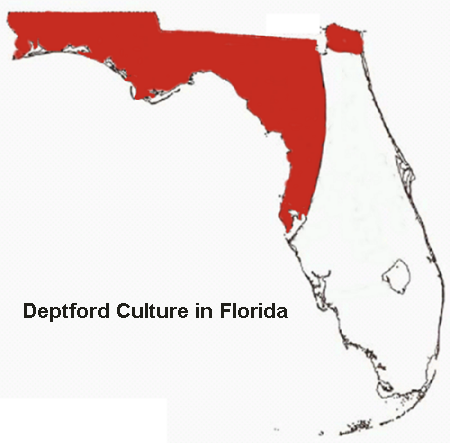
Deptford Culture in Florida

==== Deptford culture ====
The Deptford culture (2500—1900 BCE) was the first existence of the Woodland tradition in Florida. Mainly a coastal occupation though some people located inland. Ceramics were decorated and stamped. Pottery no longer tempered with plant fibers is used in favor of clay or sand pastes. East of the Aucilla River, the Deptford culture people transition directly into the Fort Walton Culture. The 2001 Letchworth Auger Survey shows no activity at the Letchworth site in Jefferson County, Florida. Sites along the coastal areas are low in numbers where many more recent sites are inland which may be in part related to the rise in sea level that probably inundated many sites. It is estimated that sea level on the Gulf of Mexico coast of northern Florida had risen 2 m (6.5 ft) over the last 2000 years.

==== Swift Creek culture ====
The Swift Creek culture first appeared in south Georgia about 100 BCE where it developed out of the Deptford culture and flourished at 200-400 CE. Villages were first established in significant numbers in the interior forest and river valleys of the eastern Panhandle, although Swift Creek sites can also be found along the coast. Ceramics were characterized by complicated stamped pottery and are commonly found in the Red Hills Region, as delineated by Cooke. These sites are especially prevalent in the river valley forest and other fertile locales. Gardening probably played a role in the Swift Creek economic system, although evidence supporting cultivation remains sparse. Bone and stone tools appear in greater numbers in their tool kits than during the previous Deptford period.

==== Weeden Island culture ====
The Weeden Island culture 400–1000. The Weeden Island culture is believed to have emerged from the Hopewell culture-based Swift Creek cultural tradition of northwest Florida during the Middle Woodland Period (c. 200 - 500) in the lower Chattahoochee-Apalachicola river drainage, persisting in some areas until the end of the Woodland period c. 1200 CE. Weeden Island sites have been found from Mobile Bay to south of Tampa Bay, extending as far north as lower-central Georgia. Concentrated around lakes Lake Miccosukee and Lake Iamonia. Adoption of maize agriculture. Pottery was Weeden Island plain ware and Swift Creek Complicated Stamped.

=== Mississippian ===
From 1100 to 1500, the Mississippian culture thrived. The Lake Jackson Mounds site, a Mississippian mound-building complex, was extremely active. It is more accurately a site of the Leon-Jefferson Culture, an advanced society of the Fort Walton Culture. Lake Jackson Mounds are located on the southwest edge of Lake Jackson in Tallahassee now the Lake Jackson Mounds Archaeological State Park and had a large village and plaza. This site was one of the most magnificent ceremonial centers in the southeastern United States. The region's red hills with extremely fertile red clay soils enabled these inhabitants to grow bountiful crops.

== 16th and 17th centuries ==
=== First period of Spanish rule ===
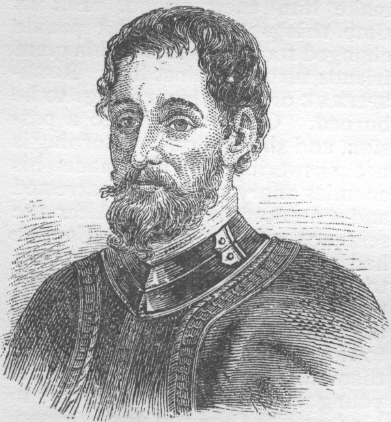
Hernando de Soto

Pánfilo de Narváez and his followers first passed south of Leon County in 1528. In 1539, Hernando de Soto stayed 5 months at the Apalachee Indian capitol of Anhaica bringing priests with him. The first Christmas in the New World was celebrated in the woods near the present capitol building. As more Spanish colonists arrived, they brought disease and fighting. This reduced the population of the Apalachee tribe who left the area for points west.

In February 1647, the Apalachee revolted against the Spanish near a mission named San Antonio de Bacuqua in present-day Leon County. The revolt changed the relationship between Spanish authorities and the Apalachee. Following the revolt, Apalachee men were forced to work on public projects in St. Augustine or on Spanish-owned ranches.

In 1656, a Spanish deputy governor and his crew settled in the Apalachee town that they called Mission San Luis de Apalachee, in the west of modern Tallahassee. With a population of more than 1,400, the Spanish established one of several Franciscan missions in the vicinity. While there, the Spaniards lived off the generosity of the Apalachee. At the same time, they tried to convert the Apalachee to the Catholic faith.

Beginning in the late 17th century, English colonists in the neighboring Province of Carolina began to formulate plans to raid Spanish Florida. During Queen Anne's War (1702–1713), Governor James Moore launched several raids into Florida, including the territory of modern-day Leon County, against Spanish missions in the region in conjunction with Indian allies. However, an attempt by Moore to capture St. Augustine ended in disgrace, forcing him to resign his post in 1703.

== 18th and 19th centuries ==
=== Second period of Spanish rule ===
In 1795 what is now Leon County along with the rest of Florida fell back under the rule of Spain. Over the years there were attacks on Indian towns in Florida by settlers in Georgia and in return Indians attacked settlers in Georgia prompting the 1817-1818 campaign by the United States Army and Andrew Jackson known as the First Seminole War. In 1818, Jackson burned Tallahassee, then invaded the small village of Miccosukee in what is now northeastern Leon County.

=== Territorial Florida ===
See also History of Tallahassee, Florida

In 1821, Florida became a territory of the United States. Both St. Augustine and Pensacola competed to become the capital city. Legislators alternated sessions. Travel was hazardous and took almost twenty days.

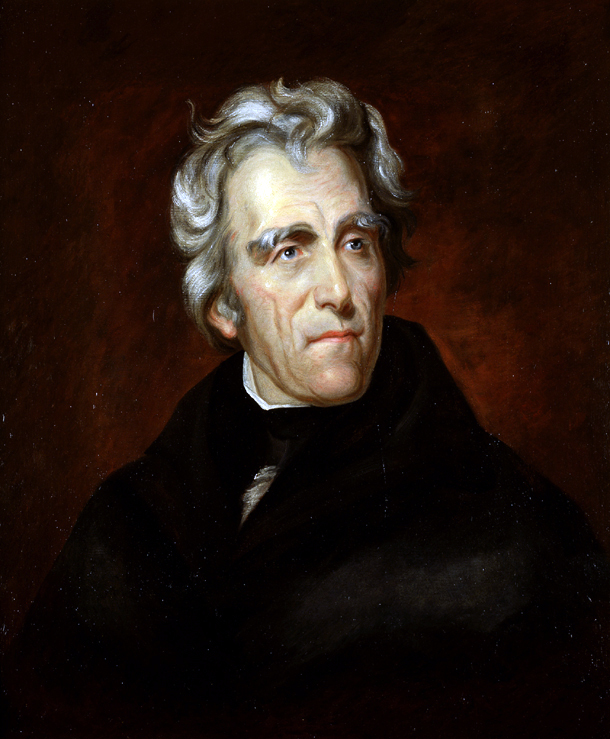
Andrew Jackson

General Andrew Jackson served as military governor of the newly acquired territory and appointed two commissioners to find a suitable new location for the state capitol. One rode on horseback from St. Augustine and the other sailed by boat from Pensacola. They met at the port of St. Marks, Florida, about 20 miles (32 km) south of present-day Tallahassee, halfway between St. Augustine and Pensacola. They discovered a place north of St. Marks. They reported,

“A more beautiful country can scarcely be managed;^{Imagined?} it is high, rolling, and well watered, the richness of the soil renders it perfectly adapted to farming."

On March 30, 1822, the United States merged East Florida and part of West Florida into the Florida Territory. Originally part of Escambia and later Gadsden County, Leon County was created in 1824. It was named for the Juan Ponce de León, Spanish explorer who was the first European to reach Florida.

=== Territorial Governors from Leon County ===
- Richard Keith Call served from 1836 to 1839 and 1841 to 1844. Though not a native, Call came to Florida in 1814 and was a land owner in Leon County as early as the 1820s. He established Orchard Pond Plantation and The Grove Plantation.
- John Branch served from 1844 to 1845. Also not a native, Branch moved to Leon County in the 1830s purchasing land on which he would establish Live Oak Plantation.

See also List of governors of Florida

=== The Plantations of Leon County ===
Leon County in the 1820s and 1830s was the destination of a number of northern planters. Besides the aforementioned R.K. Call and John Branch, names such as Francis W. Eppes, William Bailey, the Chaires brothers, the Bradford brothers, George Taliaferro Ward, and many others began large cotton plantations in Leon County. At the center of what was then called Middle Florida, there was much less population than in East Florida and West Florida, and no problem with the memories of the more lenient treatment of slaves under Spain. Building a plantation, slave-based economy in Middle Florida was much easier.

=== Second Seminole War ===
The Second Seminole War of 1835-1842 touched Leon County as it would most of Florida when family members and slaves of Green A. Chaires were massacred on his first plantation on Lake Lafayette.

In 1837, the Tallahassee Railroad was completed linking Tallahassee to the Gulf port of St. Marks to the south.

==== Forts of Leon County ====
During the Seminole Wars, 5 forts were constructed for the protection of settlers.

- 1839-1842 - Ft. Braden was named after the commander's wife who died of yellow fever. Fort Braden was located on the Ochlockonee River.
- 1840 - Fort Harriet near the head of the Sopchoppy River, 17 miles (27 km) northwest of St. Marks.
- 1839-1842 - Fort Macomb or Fort Number One M was located 10 miles (16 km) north of St. Marks.
- 1839 - Fort Number Two (M) was located on the St. Marks River just south of the unincorporated area of Rose, Florida.
- 1839 - Fort St. Augustine was located 9 miles (14 km) northeast of Fort Macomb.

=== Early Statehood ===
On March 3, 1845, Florida joined the Union as the 27th state and Leon County became the capital county of Florida.

=== Antebellum ===
From 1850 to 1865, Leon County was the wealthiest county in Florida, a "cotton kingdom"; it ranked 5th out of all of Florida and Georgia counties in the production of cotton from the 20 major plantations growing 200 bales or more. Another source states that Leon County led the state in cotton production. In the 1840, 1850, and 1860 censuses, Leon County had the highest population in Florida, followed by adjacent Gadsden, Jefferson, and Madison counties; this was documented slightly earlier, in the Florida Constitution of 1838, which gave Leon County 6 electors, more than any other county. (Adjacent Gadsden County was second, with 4.)

Leon County's population in 1860 was 73% African American, almost all of them slaves. (Starting in 1861, all free blacks had to register with the county and pay $1 for a permit; each required a local white sponsor, who could be sued for actions of the negro, as negroes could not be sued.) As was true elsewhere in the South, the value of those slaves far exceeded the value of all the land in the county. Leon County had more slaves than any other county in Florida, and therefore it was the wealthiest county in Florida. Leon County was the center of the slave trade in Florida.

=== 1860s ===
==== The Civil War ====
Florida seceded from the Union January 10, 1861, and sided with the Confederacy. A vast number of men from Leon County served as officers and enlisted men in companies that served as far north as Gettysburg. Officers included George Taliaferro Ward, George Washington Scott, Patrick Houston, and Frederick L. Villepigue. Houston and Villepigue headed the Kilcrease Light Artillery.

The only battle of the Civil War within Leon County took place on March 6, 1865, at the Battle of Natural Bridge with the small Confederate forces of around 1,000 men, including students from the West Florida Seminary, under Sam Jones going up against John Newton and his 2nd and 99th U.S. Colored Infantry units. Leon County supported the effort with three military encampments. These were Camp Leon, Camp Lay, and Camp Mary Davis, all established around 1861.

=== Reconstruction ===
The Southern Homestead Act of 1866 allowed the opening of government lands in Arkansas, Mississippi, Alabama, Louisiana, and Florida for homesteading and with help from the Freedmen's Bureau, freedmen could secure land. Thus they flocked to Florida, mainly from Georgia and the Carolinas, to take advantage of the offer of farmland in Leon County.

=== The 1880s and 1890s ===
Leon County resident and cotton plantation owner William D. Bloxham served as governor from 1881 to 1885 and took office again from 1897 to 1901.

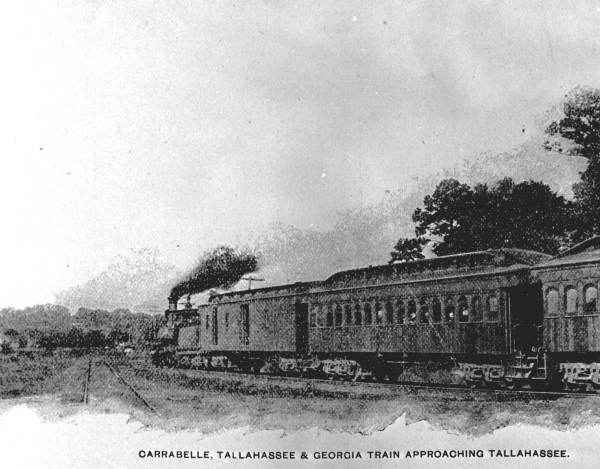
C.T. & G. Train approaching Tallahassee (1895)

==== The Carrabelle, Tallahassee and Georgia Railroad ====
The Carrabelle, Tallahassee and Georgia Railroad began service during the 1880s with service from the Gulf coast to southern Georgia.

== 20th century ==
=== 1900 through 1920 ===
==== Cattle & dairy ====
Around 1900, dairying had developed from a sideline way of making money in the previous 35–40 years to a large business concern making Leon County the leading county and first in milk production by 1900. Butter was a primary product while the skim milk was fed to hogs. By 1916, Jacksonville was receiving milk for ice cream via the Seaboard Railway and by 1918 approximately 1000 gallons of milk left Leon County for production plants in Jacksonville. The dairy industry became a $100,000 a year agribusiness. The Leon County Dairy Association was organized in 1918. The 1920 census showed Leon County as having 7885 dairy cows with milk production at 589,350 gallons. Tallahassee's first milk plant was opened by 1923 and there were 25 operational dairies in Leon. Just prior to World War II, milk production was 745,901 gallons a day. By 1964, dairies had decreased to 11 with only 1 dairy in production and home delivery of dairy products. Production of milk was now worth $1,284,536.

In the 1880s, Robert F. Bradford, grandson of Richard Bradford of Water Oak Plantation, had given up on cotton and had 2,000 acres (8.1 km^{2}) devoted to livestock and dairying. By 1911 Robert F. Bradford, Jr. joined the business with 100 Jersey cattle which fed along the shores of Lake Iamonia. The farm was one of the first in the county to have silos. Dairying halted in 1935 when the farm was sold to Lloyd Griscom of Luna Plantation. Bradford continued with 75 cows and continued milk operations west of Tallahassee as the Leon County Milk Company.

== 1940 through 1960 ==
=== Beef cattle ===
The 1940s through 1960s saw an increase in the raising of beef cattle in Leon County. Some of the increase can be attributed to St. Joe Paper Company as well as some game plantation owners. Among some of Leon County's beef producers were Payne H. Midyette, Sr. and Payne H. Midyette, Jr. who had 775 acres (3.14 km^{2}) on Miccosukee Road. In 1939, Payne Sr. introduced the first purebred Hereford herd into the county. Tallahassee City Manager Arvah Hopkins and brother William Hopkins, a State Attorney, had 300 to 500 head on 2,000 acres (8.1 km^{2}). Both were grandsons of Goodwood Plantation owner Arvah Hopkins. Bull Headley of Bull Run Plantation ran 500 head of cattle.

== See also ==
- History of Tallahassee, Florida
