= Frenchtown (Tallahassee) =

African-American neighborhood in Tallahassee, Florida

Coordinates: 30.450°N 84.292°W

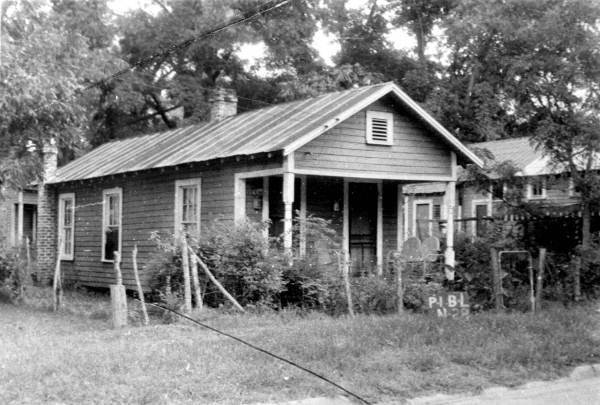
A duplex in Frenchtown, 1950s

Frenchtown is a historic African-American neighborhood in Florida, located in the state's capital of Tallahassee. Recognized as the oldest surviving community of its kind in the state, it was established in the aftermath of the Emancipation Proclamation of 1863, as freed slaves founded settlements during the Reconstruction era.

== Origin ==
Frenchtown originated from 19th century settlers who moved to the area from France. Their relocation was prompted by the July 4, 1825, Lafayette Land Grant which gave Gilbert du Motier, Marquis de Lafayette a township in the U.S. of his choice. Many of his acquaintances came over and began to carry on with their lives.

== History ==
The Frenchtown area was initially home to French settlers who did not move west to New Orleans or back to France. After the Civil War, newly freed African-Americans moved to the Frenchtown area; it occupied low-lying, relatively undesirable land, and therefore was available. Beginning in the early 20th century, the area became a hub of activity with growing businesses. From 1940 to 1945, Ray Charles lived in this community. Nat Adderley and brother Cannonball Adderley were known to have played here in their younger days. Cab Calloway and Al Green would frequently play in Frenchtown on their way to New Orleans. The Red Bird Club and Cafe DeLuxe in Frenchtown provided a wealth of musical talent, with "Lawyer Smith and his Band" has been there for 30 years. During the civil rights movement, organizations such as the NAACP and the Urban League emerged in the Frenchtown area, organizing protests and advocacy efforts at the state's capital.

Following the end of segregation, local schools, healthcare facilities, and public services were either relocated or suffered major cuts to funding, which proved detrimental to Frenchtown's economic growth. The area also saw an increase in drug-related activity and crime during the 1980s, contributing to the community's growing socioeconomic challenges. According to Patrick Mason, an economics professor at University of Massachusetts Amherst, the neighborhood experienced economic stagnation and a decline in local commerce between 1974 and 1995. “Local businesses found it hard to compete with national chains in the grocery and the fast-food industries,” Mason noted in an interview.

== Revitalization efforts ==
In April 2005, the city's revitalization efforts began with the completion of the Frenchtown Renaissance Center. In 2008, the B Sharps Jazz Club opened in the newly restored Woman's Working Band House of 1921; international jazz talent often performs there. The house is listed on the National Register of Historic Places.

In April 2016, "Frenchtown Better Block", a community engagement project funded by the Knight Foundation was announced. The initiative was led by the City of Tallahassee in collaboration with graduate students from the Department of Urban and Regional Planning at Florida State University.

Frenchtown has experienced increased development activity in recent years. Its proximity to Florida State University, with some areas located less than a quarter-mile away, has contributed to the growing demand for housing and commercial space. This has raised concerns among residents and community advocates about potential gentrification and displacement.

== Demographics ==
As of 2019 data from the City of Tallahassee, Frenchtown has a population of approximately 5,716 residents and contains over 2,000 households. The neighborhood's median annual income is around $24,000, with an estimated 24.8% of residents living below the poverty line compared to an overall poverty rate of 12% in Tallahassee. Demographically, more than two-thirds of Frenchtown's population identifies as African American, in contrast to the citywide proportion of less than 35%.

== Location ==
Frenchtown is located northwest of downtown Tallahassee. The City of Tallahassee Planning Department defined the neighborhood's boundaries as Seventh Avenue and Alabama Street to the north, Bronough Street to the east, Tennessee Street to the south and Woodward Avenue to the west. However, until the 1970s it extended south of Tennessee Street to Park Avenue, including land currently occupied by the LeRoy Collins Leon County Public Library.

Frenchtown is located in the poorest zip code in the state, according to a 2018 study by the Florida Chamber of Commerce.

== Education ==
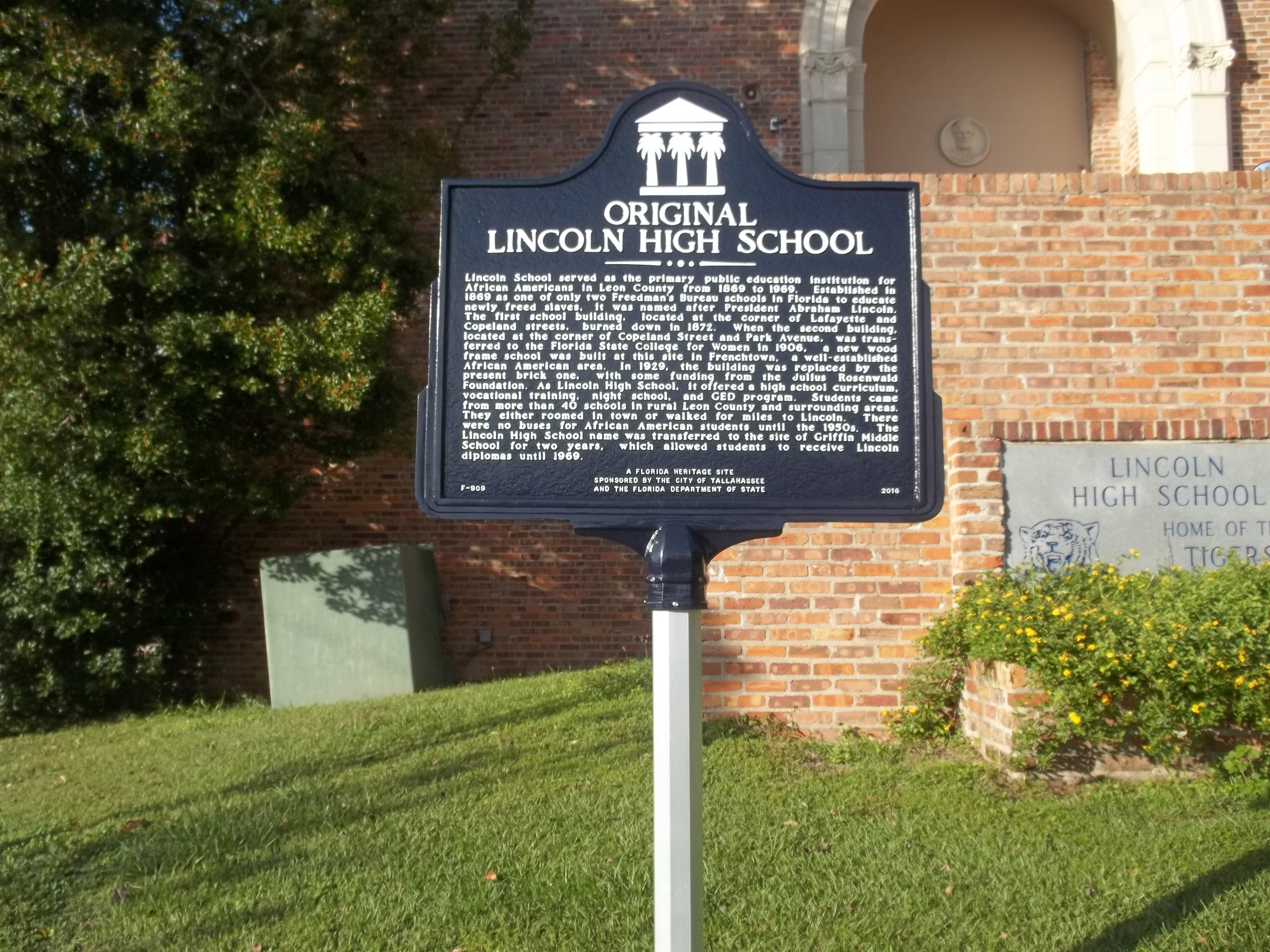
Old Lincoln High School, located in Frenchtown

Residents are served by Leon County Schools. Most residents are zoned to either Riley Elementary School or Bond Elementary School, while some are zoned to Ruediger Elementary School. Residents are divided between Griffin Middle School and Raa Middle School, and between Leon High School and Godby High School.

At the north end of Macomb Street is the Old Lincoln High School, today a neighborhood service center. It closed as a school in 1969, when blacks were admitted to the previously all-white Leon High School.

== See also ==
- History of Tallahassee § Black history
