= David S. Walker Library =

- U.S. National Register of Historic Places
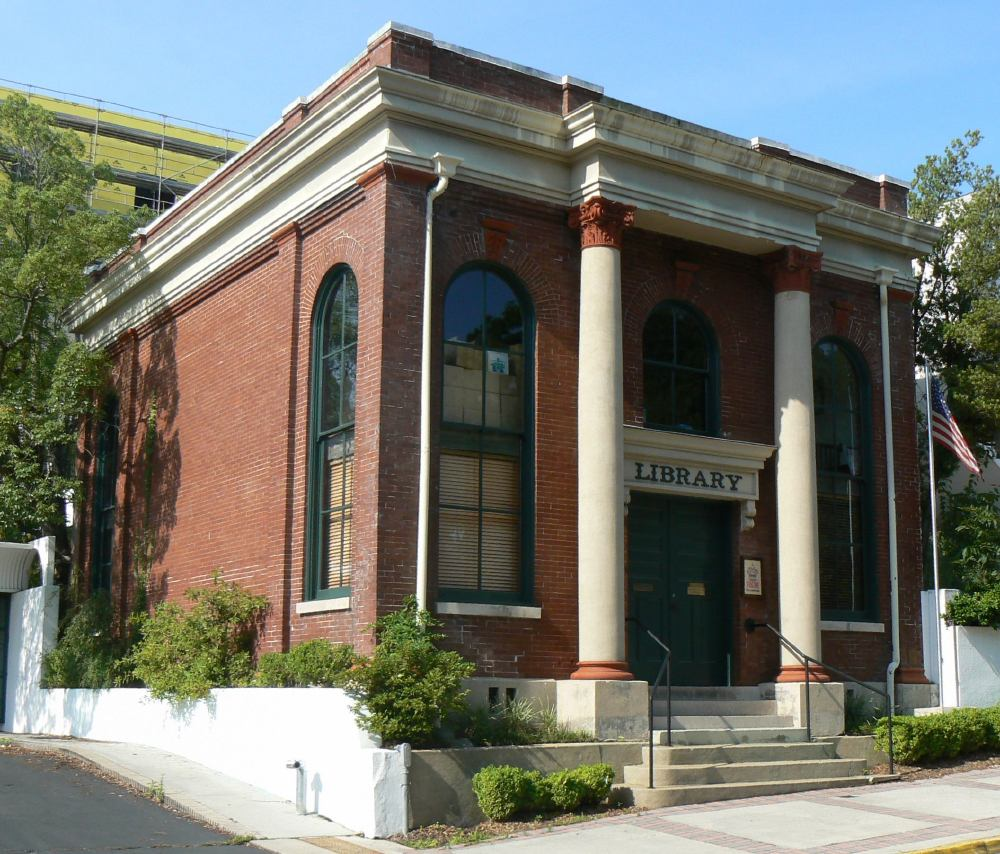
- David S. Walker Library

- Location within Florida Location within the United States
- Location: Tallahassee, Florida
- Coordinates: 30°26′29″N 84°16′49″W
- Architectural style: Classical Revival
- NRHP reference No.: 76000600
- Added to NRHP: June 22, 1976

The David S. Walker Library was a private subscription library in Tallahassee, Florida. It was organized as the University Library in 1883. It was Tallahassee's first library. It is now a historic library building named for Governor David S. Walker, the eighth governor of Florida, who served from 1865 through 1868. It is located 209 East Park Avenue. It was added to the National Register of Historic Places in 1976. The library building is one of 65 Leon County properties listed on the National Register of Historic Places.

The Walker Library continued to function as a private library at least through October 1975. As of that date, it offered library memberships for $6.00 per year. In 1956, a free public library, The LeRoy Collins Leon County Public Library, was opened in downtown Tallahassee, in an historic antebellum home called The Columns. The two libraries were a few blocks apart.

In 2018, it has no book collection nor has for many years.

The library building has served as the meeting place for the board of Springtime Tallahassee since 1977.

Throughout the 1980s and 90s the Library building served as a rentable space. The top level was a large open room with wooden floors, and served as a space for dance teams and instructors providing lessons and scheduling rehearsals in ballroom, tap, and other dance disciplines for many years.

== History ==
David Shelby Walker was a native of Kentucky when he moved to Tallahassee, Florida in 1837. He served as the eighth governor of Florida. Walker was elected governor of Florida after the Civil War ended. The country was recovering from the aftermath of the Civil War and so it was a tough time in office. Despite the turmoil, Walker's efforts to establish public education in Florida were a great achievement. While Walker was in office, in 1884, he offered two rooms for a library in a building he owned. Donations were raised by the community to buy books and create a reading room that was open to the public. After Walker's death, the building was sold and Walker's wife donated the lot to the library association and the building was named in honor of Walker and his support for education and libraries. The Walker Library served as a library from 1903 to 1956, after which the library moved to the Columns.

Following a four-month restoration, the Walker library was converted into an upscale bar and restaurant, Bar 1903, by local restaurateurs Seven Hills Hospitality Group, which opened its doors in February 2020. The building's internal restoration was mainly cosmetic, introducing a new bar, wood flooring rejuvenation and new paint throughout, preserving a majority of the library's original design and structural elements. Due to the age and historic nature of the library building, Bar 1903 can seat roughly 36 customers at a time.

== See also ==
- Carnegie Library at FAMU
- LeRoy Collins Leon County Public Library
