= Woman's Working Band House =

- U.S. National Register of Historic Places
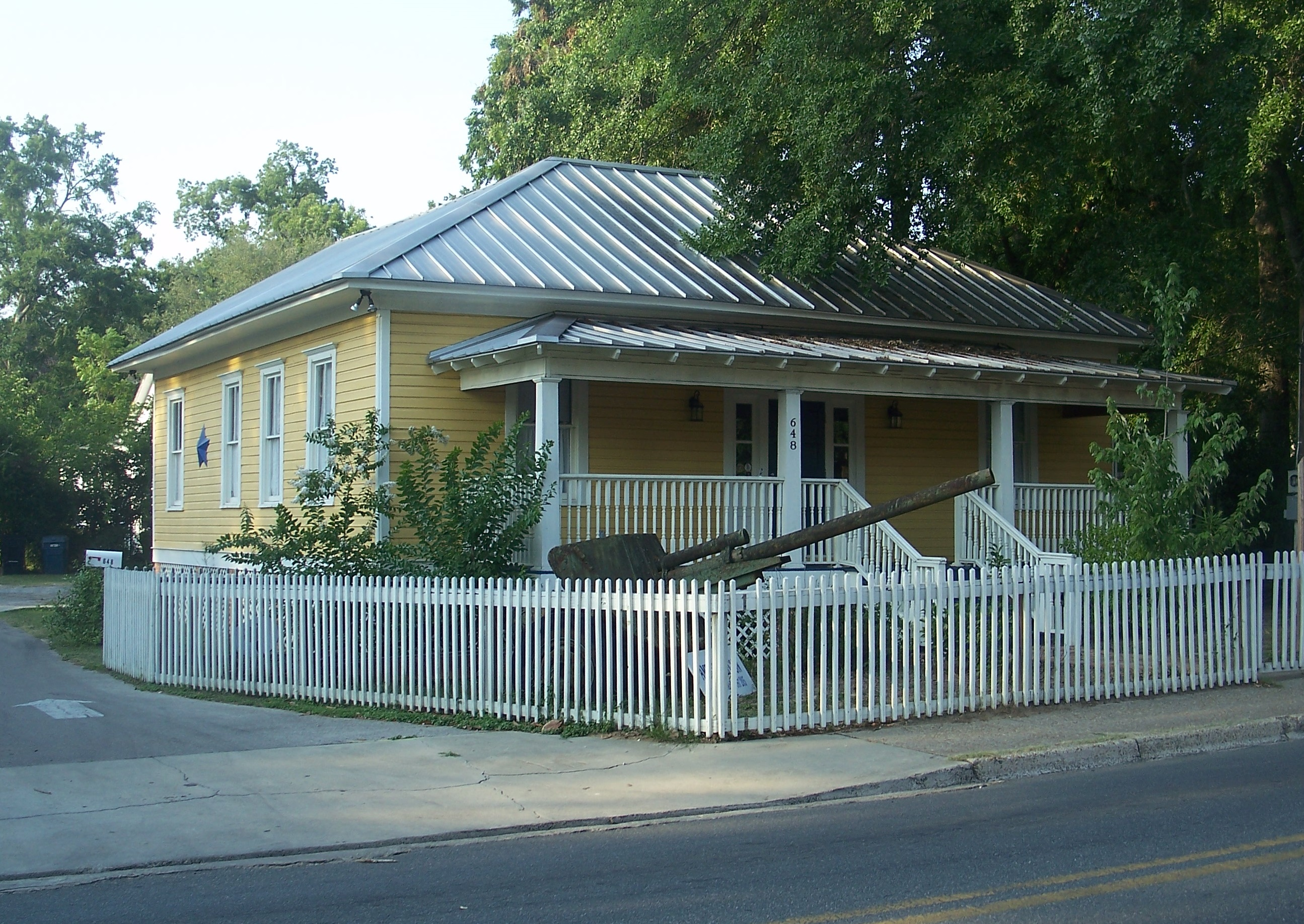

- Location within Florida Location within the United States
- Location: Tallahassee, Florida
- Coordinates: 30°26′57″N 84°17′34″W
- NRHP reference No.: 10000848
- Added to NRHP: October 20, 2010

Woman's Working Band House is a historic house in Tallahassee, Leon County, Florida. It is located at 648 W. Brevard St. in Frenchtown, the oldest surviving African-American community in Florida.

It was added to the National Register of Historic Places on October 20, 2010.

This completely restored National Register Property currently (2018) houses the B Sharps Jazz Club. This house is one of the few recognized, extant properties financed jointly by rank and file and upper class African-American women. Its cornerstone was laid in 1921 by the Woman's [sic] Working Band and it was built to serve as an Old Folks Home.
