= Payne Midyette =

American politician (b. 1898, d. 1983)

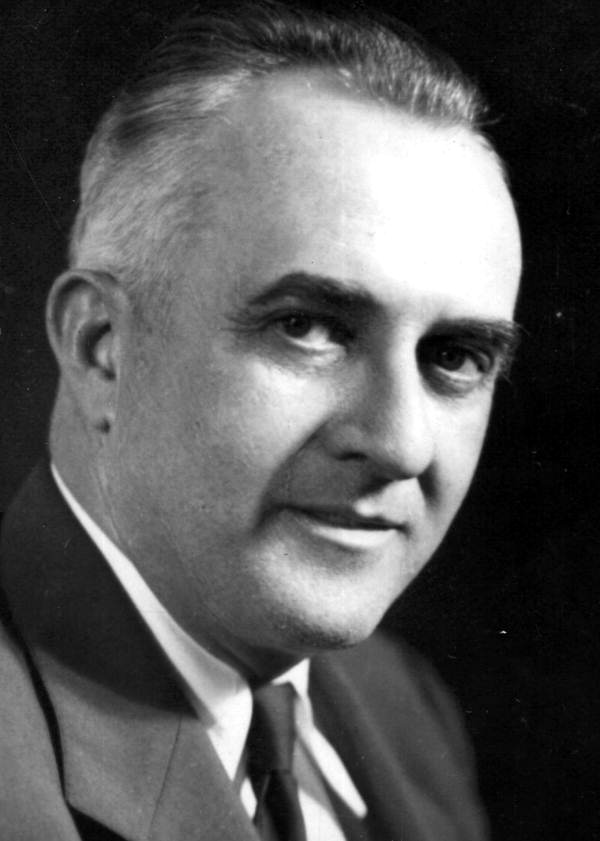
- Midyette in 1947

Member of the Florida House of Representatives
- In office 1945–1947

Personal details
- Born: 1898
- Died: 1983 (aged 84–85)
- Party: Democratic

Payne H. Midyette Sr. (1898–1983) was an American insurance broker, politician and rancher in Tallahassee, Florida. He served one term in the Florida House of Representatives (1945–1947) and established an insurance agency in the tallest building in Tallahassee. Midyette Road in Tallahassee is named for him. With Frank D. Moor as partner, they established in 1931 the insurance firm Midyette-Moor Inc.

Midyette served in Europe with 32nd Infantry Division during World War I.
