= LeRoy Collins Leon County Public Library =

Public library system in Florida

LeRoy Collins Leon County Public Library System
- Location: 200 West Park Avenue; Tallahassee, Florida 32301
- Established: 1955
- Branches: 6

Collection
- Size: 518,376

Access and use
- Population served: About 193,551 Leon County Residents

Other information
- Director: Pamela Monroe
- Employees: Approx. 100
- Website: http://cms.leoncountyfl.gov/Library

The LeRoy Collins Leon County Public Library is a system of public libraries in Leon County, Florida.

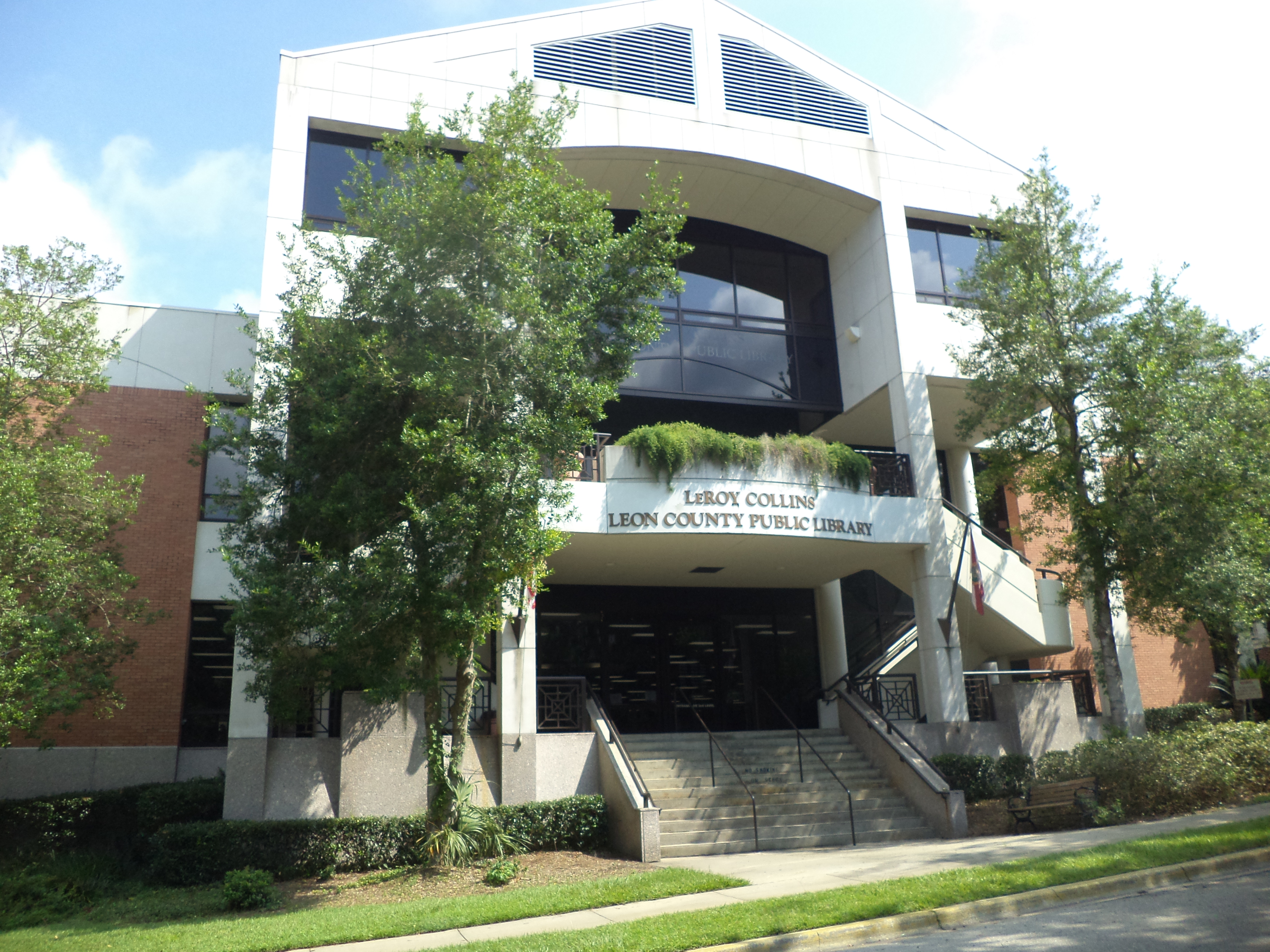
Leroy Collins Leon County Library

== History ==
In 1954, the American Association of University Women established a Friends of the Library group for Leon County to generate public support for a library in Tallahassee, Florida. Prior to that, the only public library in Tallahassee was the David S. Walker Library, which served white patrons only.

The Leon County Public Library was established in May 1955 and the first Leon County free public library opened its doors on March 21, 1956, in 5,000 square feet of The Columns, one of the oldest remaining antebellum homes in the Leon County area, and located at Park and Adams. Close to 5,000 volumes were on its shelves.

The Library moved to the old Elks Club building at 127 North Monroe Street in 1962, more than doubling its space to 12,000 square feet as opposed to the original library's size of 5,000 square feet.

The Leon County Public Library became the Leon, Jefferson, and Wakulla County Public Library System after Jefferson County joined in 1970 and Wakulla County joined in 1971. The original name returned when Wakulla County left the library system in 1975 and Jefferson County left in 1980.

A small branch library called Page One opened in the Bond Community in September 1975 and the main library moved again to a 44,000-square-foot space in the lower level of the Northwood Mall on North Monroe St. The idea to create a new building for the main library began in 1986. The proposed building would be 88,000 square feet and cost $8.5 million to build. The ground breaking was held on March 4, 1989 for the main library facility. The site was next door to the library's original home, The Columns, which had been moved in 1971. The new library building officially opened in January 1991.

Sandra Wilson, who was to oversee the development of the library's new home, was the library director from 1988 until 1991. Helen Moeller took over for her in 1992.

The Leon County Public Library was renamed the LeRoy Collins Leon County Public Library on September 17, 1993 in honor of LeRoy Collins, the 33rd Governor of Florida.

== Locations ==
The library system has seven locations in Tallahassee, Florida.

=== LeRoy Collins Leon County Main Library ===
The first Leon County library opened in 1956 in The Columns before moving to the old Elks Club building on North Monroe Street in May 1962. The in 1978 it was transferred again as the Leon County Main Library to the Northwood Mall and was increased from 12,000 to 44,000 square feet. It moved locations yet again in 1989 (then officially opened in 1991) when the new main library facility was opened on West Park Avenue. The library was renamed to LeRoy Collins Leon County Public Library in 1993 after the late Governor LeRoy Collins.

=== Dr. B.L. Perry, Jr. Branch Library ===
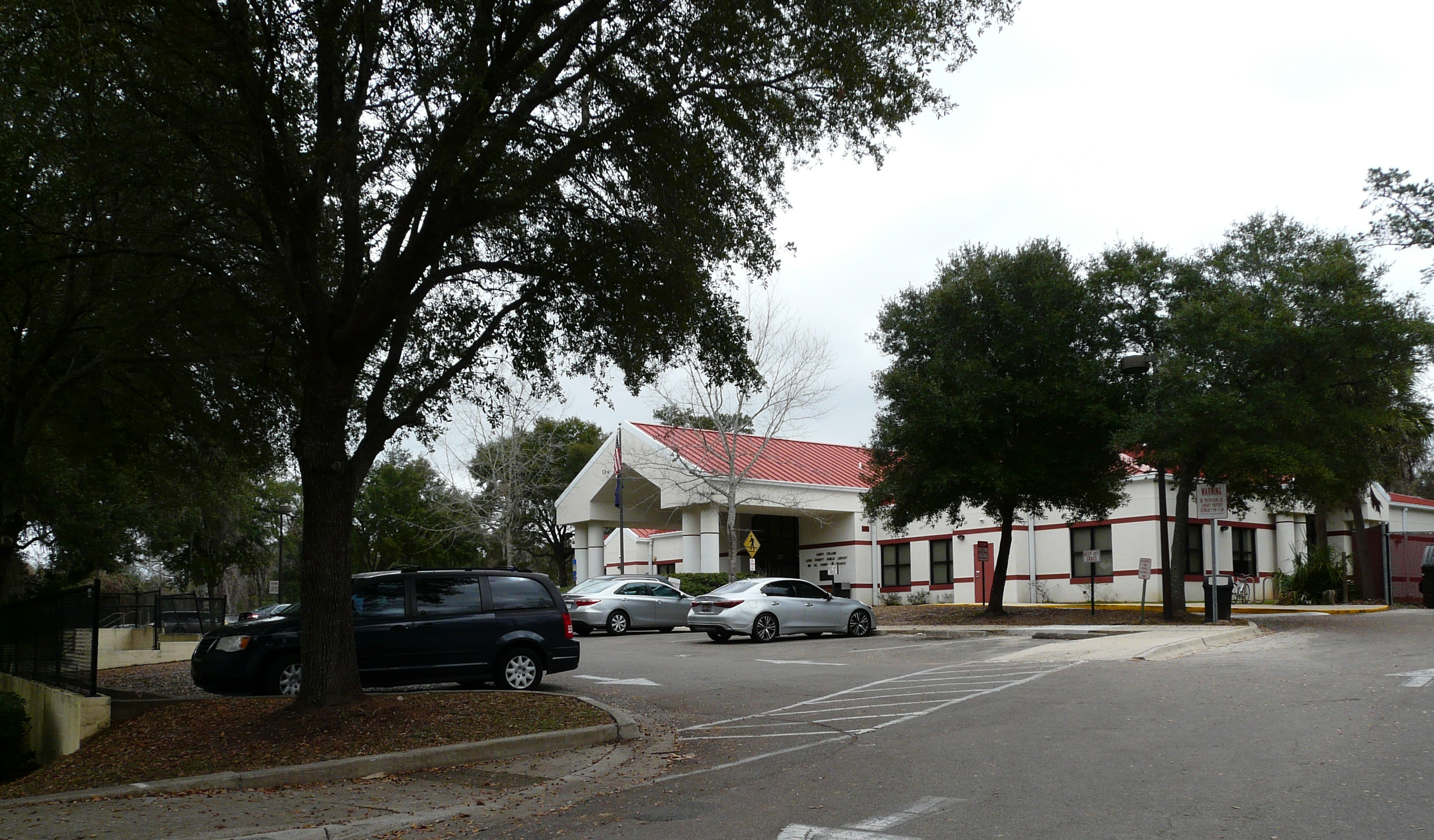
B.L. Perry Jr. Branch

In September 1975 a small branch opened in Bond Community. It was later renamed as the Dr. B.L. Perry Jr. Branch Library, after the former Florida A&M University president. The library was moved to a new 10,000-square-foot building on South Adams Street in 2001, then a 3,000 square foot expansion was added onto that building in November 2010 with a ribbon cutting ceremony reveal.

=== Eastside Branch Library ===
Under the Leon County Library System's care were a few bookmobiles. One of the retired ones were used as a location for the Parkway Branch Library that was moved into the Cross Creek Square Shopping Center in 1997. In 2011 that 2,000-square-foot location was then closed and transferred to a new 12.000-square-foot LEED-certified building on Pedrick Road and renamed to Eastside Branch Library in November of that year. Six years later, a Silver LEED (Leadership in Energy and Environment Design) certification was granted to the Eastside branch and in 2018 the main library and Eastside organized free electric car charging stations.

=== Jane G. Sauls Fort Braden Branch Library ===
A unique 5,600-square-foot building on Blountstown Highway was opened in 2004 for the Fort Braden Library. In 2016 it was renamed the Jane G. Sauls Fort Braden Branch Library after the retired commissioner Jane G. Sauls.

=== Lake Jackson Branch Library ===
In 1991 this branch originally opened in a storefront in Huntington Oaks Shopping Center, then in 2012 was transferred to a 12,000-square-foot, specially designed, space in the same center. It adjoined the Leon County northwestern community center.

=== Bruce J. Host Northeast Branch Library ===
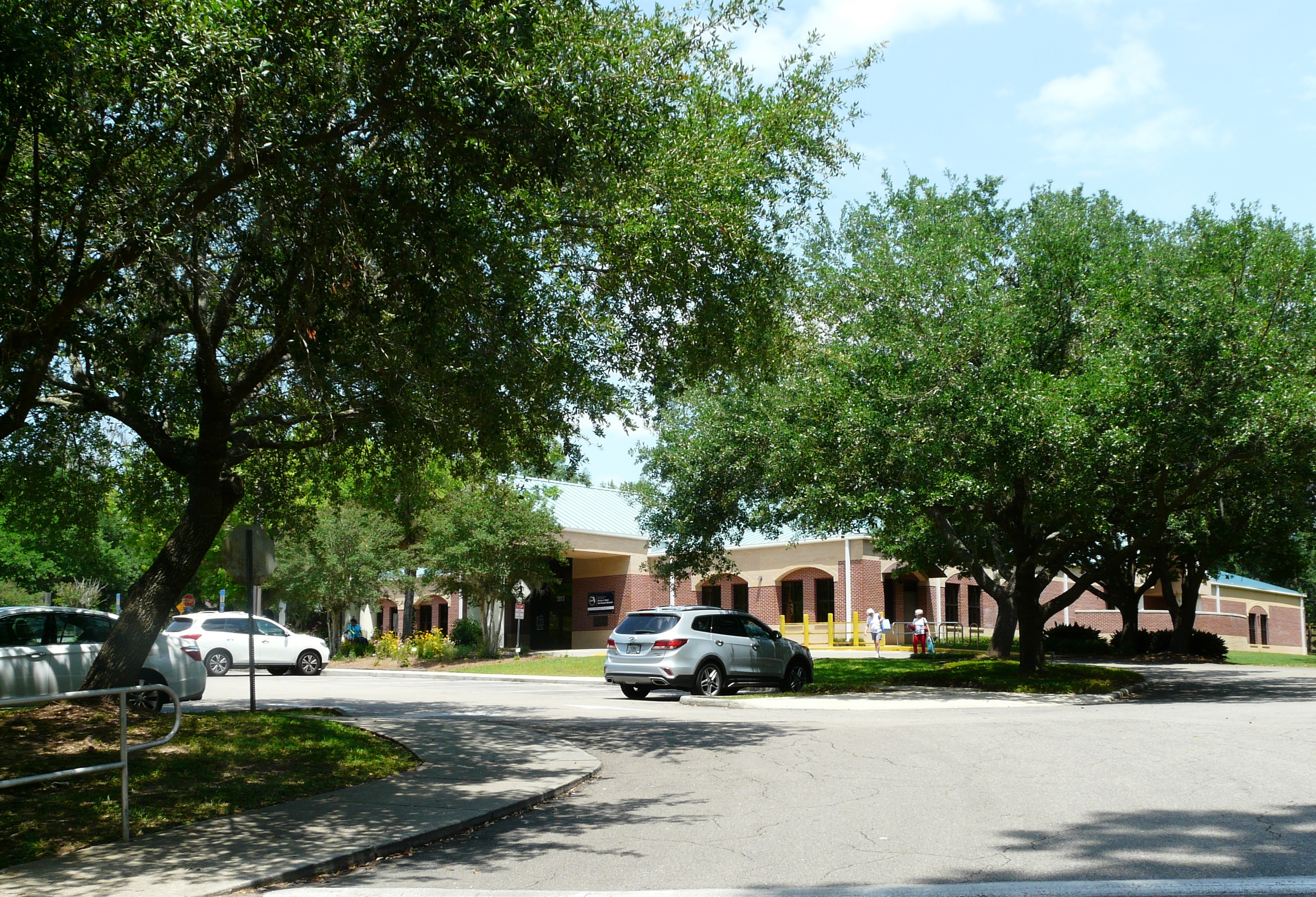
Northeast Branch

Originally situated in the Northampton Shopping center in 1994, the Northeast branch moved to a building on Thomasville Road in June 2000. Four years later it was dedicated to Bruce J, Host, a former Leon County Commissioner. A new expansion was added in 2010, turning the 14,000-square-foot to a 19,000-square-foot building. Solar panels were added in 2019 to the branch.

=== Woodville Branch Library ===
As the newest library of Leon County, this library was added to the Woodville Community Center in October 2011, with 2,000-square-foot of space. The library addition led to the creation of the Woodville Founders' Festival when Verna Brock became the director of the branch.

== Resources and services ==
Materials: The LCLCPL system offers books, DVDs, audio books, CDs, telescopes, hotspots, and seasonal seeds. Aside from physical items, the library also offers Flipster, Hoopla, and Libby by Overdrive, applications where patrons can download electronic books, electronic audio books, and e-magazines. Through the Friends of the Library, LCLCPL also offers Kanopy, a video streaming service. All materials are free to check out with a library card. In addition to these materials, in 2021, Leon County library leaders announced they had received a $15,000 grant to expand their Library of Things, allowing patrons to save money by borrowing larger, more expensive limited-use items such as power tools, telescopes and kayaks.

Services: LCLCPL offers adult and youth services programming. Past events have included Music in the Stacks, Candyland, Booked for Lunch author events, Coffee and Cards, Science Night, Teen Movie Mob Night, Archaeology Story Time, and many seasonal events put on by the Friends of the Library such as the Title Wave Used Book Sale. Another service offered is Tech Help 1 on 1 in which a patron can book a library staff for a one-hour session to learn basic computer skills, help with their mobile devices, learn on the library's desktop PC and basic internet skills. Ask a Librarian is also available through LCLCPL. In 2024, Leon County launched a new website, including a refurbished website for the library system to provide improved access to library services and materials.

== Grants, awards, and recognition ==
In 2018, the library was awarded a grant by the Florida Humanities Council to offer activities that went along with The Great American Read. January 2017, the Eastside Branch Library was awarded Silver LEED (Leadership in Energy and Environmental Design). In 2014, two Information Professionals won awards for their participation in Florida's cooperative Ask a Librarian; the “SuperStar” award and the “Brief Exemplary Chat” award. In 2011 and 2019, the library received grants from the National Endowment for the Arts Big Read Program. The library used the 2019 grant to fund a slate of public activities related to local author Jeff Vandermeer's book Borne, including book discussions, an outdoor reading by Vandermeer, and an installment in the Library Lecture Series, also presided over by Vandermeer, about Leon County's biodiversity as it related to the novel.

== Library Lecture Series ==
The Library Lecture Series are events hosted by the Leon County Government in conjunction with the LeRoy Collins Leon County Public Library. This Series brings experts to talk about an array of engaging topics. The first series happened in April 2017, in which the Director of the National High Magnetic Field Laboratory, Dr. George Boebinger, spoke about the research being conducted at the Mag Lab in Tallahassee, FL. The Library Lecture Series has partnered with other entities in the community such as Florida State University and Florida A&M University. The events are hosted at the library branches and occasionally are hosted at places such as the Meek Eaton Black Archives or venues such as the Fifth and Thomas.

== See also ==
- Carnegie Library at FAMU
