= Camp Lay =

Former Confederate army encampment in Florida

Confederate States of America

Camp Lay was a Confederate army encampment during the American Civil War located near Tallahassee in Leon County, Florida, United States. Its exact location is not currently known.

Camp Lay is known to have had these individuals:

- Private Joseph White Campbell, who enlisted April 20, 1864, Company B, 8th Florida Infantry. Campbell was from Gadsden County.
- Private Jonah Beale Davis, who enlisted September 24, 1864, Company B, 8th Florida Infantry. Davis was from Decatur County, Georgia.

== See also ==
- Camp Leon
- Camp Mary Davis
