= Camp Mary Davis =

Confederate States of America

Camp Mary Davis was a Confederate army cavalry encampment established in 1861 to serve the Confederacy during the American Civil War. It was located near Tallahassee and most likely in Leon County, Florida, United States. Camp Mary Davis' former location is reportedly at a cemetery at Tharpe and Old Bainbridge roads.

Camp Mary Davis is known to have had these individuals:

- Captain William M. Footman, 1st Florida Cavalry.
- James W. Faulkner who enlisted November 25, 1861 born in Jasper County, Georgia
- Private Thomas Nathaniel Bell who enlisted April 25, 1862 into Company E, 1st Florida Cavalry.
- Thomas J. Shine of Tallahassee re-enlisted on November 25, 1861, in Company F, 1st Florida Cavalry. Shine married Martha Virginia Eppes, daughter of Francis Eppes, Tallahassee's first mayor and grandson of Thomas Jefferson.
- John William Crichton, Company K, 1st Florida Cavalry, who mustered in at age 15. He was the son of the former Mayor of Tampa, Dr. John Pritchard Crichton.

== See also ==
- Camp Leon
- Camp Lay
