= Camp Leon =

US Civil War Confederate army encampment in Florida

Confederate States of America

Camp Leon was a Confederate army encampment during the American Civil War located south of Tallahassee in southern Leon County, Florida, United States near the unincorporated community of Belair. It is the best known of the three camps located in the county.

Camp Leon was the initial mustering point for the Kilcrease Light Artillery, also known as Villepigue's Light Battery, by September 1863. It was organized a Florida company, Confederate Army, Department of South Carolina, Georgia and Florida. The company was named for its captain, Fred L. Villepigue, Florida Secretary of State from 1853 to 1863.

Camp Leon had individuals from the following infantry units:

- Company D, 5th Florida Infantry
- Company I, 5th Florida Infantry
- Company K, 5th Florida Infantry
- Company A, 8th Florida Infantry
- Company E, 10th Florida Infantry

The Kilcrease Light Artillery returned to Florida in March 1864 to support the Confederate defenses at Camp Milton, west of Jacksonville, Florida. In August 1864 at Brandy Branch, the unit skirmished with Union forces. In March 1865 at Battle of Natural Bridge, it assisted in repelling a Union thrust against Tallahassee. It remained stationed in north Florida until the end of the war. In May, 1865, the Kilcrease Light Artillery disbanded and its men were paroled.

== See also ==
- Camp Lay
- Camp Mary Davis
