= Union Bank (Tallahassee, Florida) =

- U.S. National Register of Historic Places
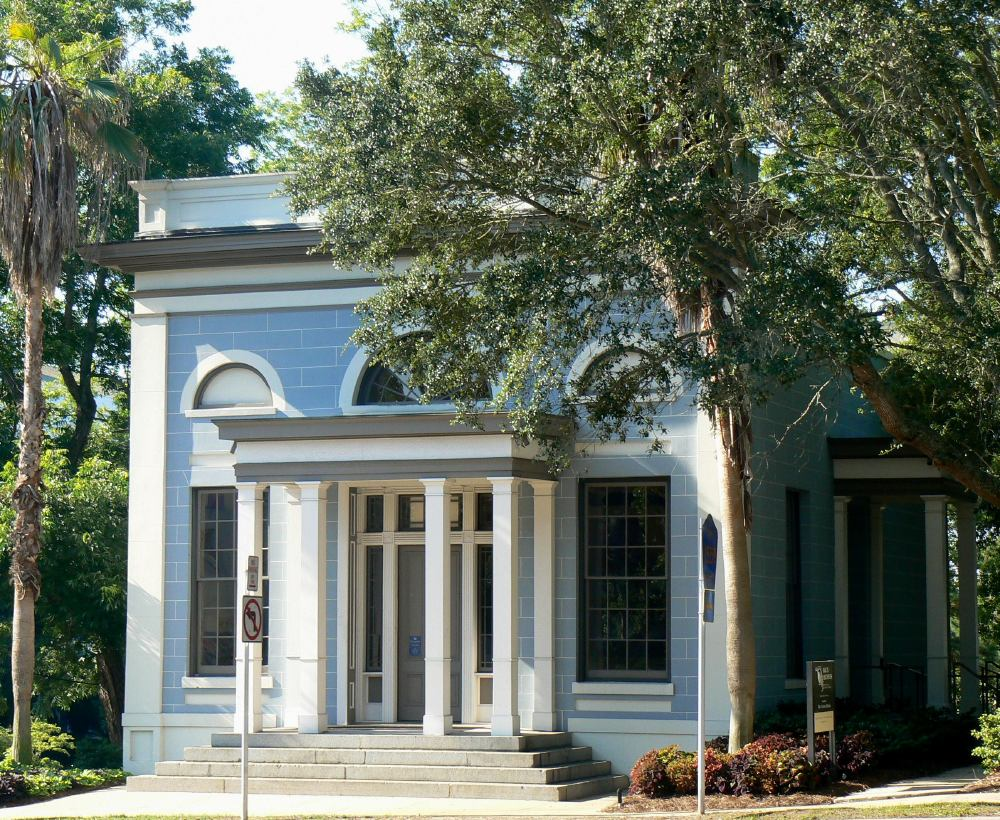
- Union Bank

- Location within Florida Location within the United States
- Location: Tallahassee, Florida
- Coordinates: 30°26′15″N 84°16′48″W
- NRHP reference No.: 71000242
- Added to NRHP: February 24, 1971

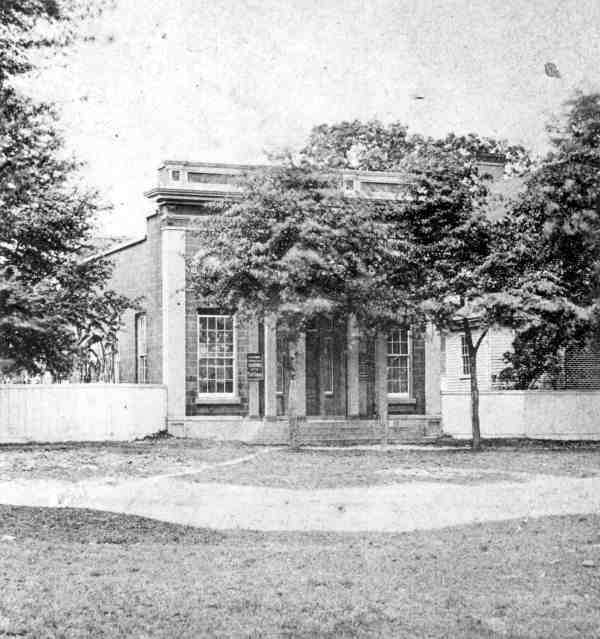
Old photograph of Union Bank of Tallahassee

The Union Bank of Tallahassee, Florida was established around 1830 and the bank building constructed for it in 1841. It is Florida's oldest surviving bank building. It is located at Apalachee Parkway and Calhoun Street and is now a museum and archive and research center for African American history. On February 24, 1971, it was added to the U.S. National Register of Historic Places.

== History ==
The Union Bank building was completed in 1841 as Tallahassee's first bank by William Williams when Florida was still a territory (Florida Territory). It was chartered to help finance local cotton plantations. It closed in 1843 due to the Seminole Wars, unsound banking practices, and the long recession following the Panic of 1837.

In 1847, the bank was purchased by cotton plantation owners William Bailey and Isaac Mitchell.

After the Civil War, the bank building reopened as the Freedman's Savings and Trust Company in 1868 for emancipated slaves. It later served as a church, feed store, art house, coffee house, dance studio, locksmith's shop, beauty shop, and shoe factory.

== Willis Jiles ==
Willis Jiles, originally Giles, (1874 - 1963) owned a cobbler shop in the building in the 1920s. Jiles was a graduate of the Tuskegee Institute. His children with wife Sadie graduated from Florida A & M and Xavier University.

== Relocation ==
In 1971, the bank building was moved from its original site on the west side of Adams Street between College Avenue and Park Avenue, to just east of the Capitol on Apalachee Parkway and Calhoun Avenue where it underwent restoration and was opened as a museum in 1984.

== Southeastern Regional Black Archives Research Center and Museum ==
The Union Bank building now serves as an extension of the Florida A&M University Southeastern Regional Black Archives, Research Center and Museum. The site is also known as the Capitol Complex Extension Branch of the Southeastern Regional Black Archives.

The museum is open to the public and school groups only on weekdays. Artifacts and documents reflecting black history and culture in Florida are on display, and public programs are provided by Black Archives staff.

The main location for the Southeastern Regional Black Archives, Research Center and Museum is located at the Carnegie Library at FAMU.
