= Nene (trail) =

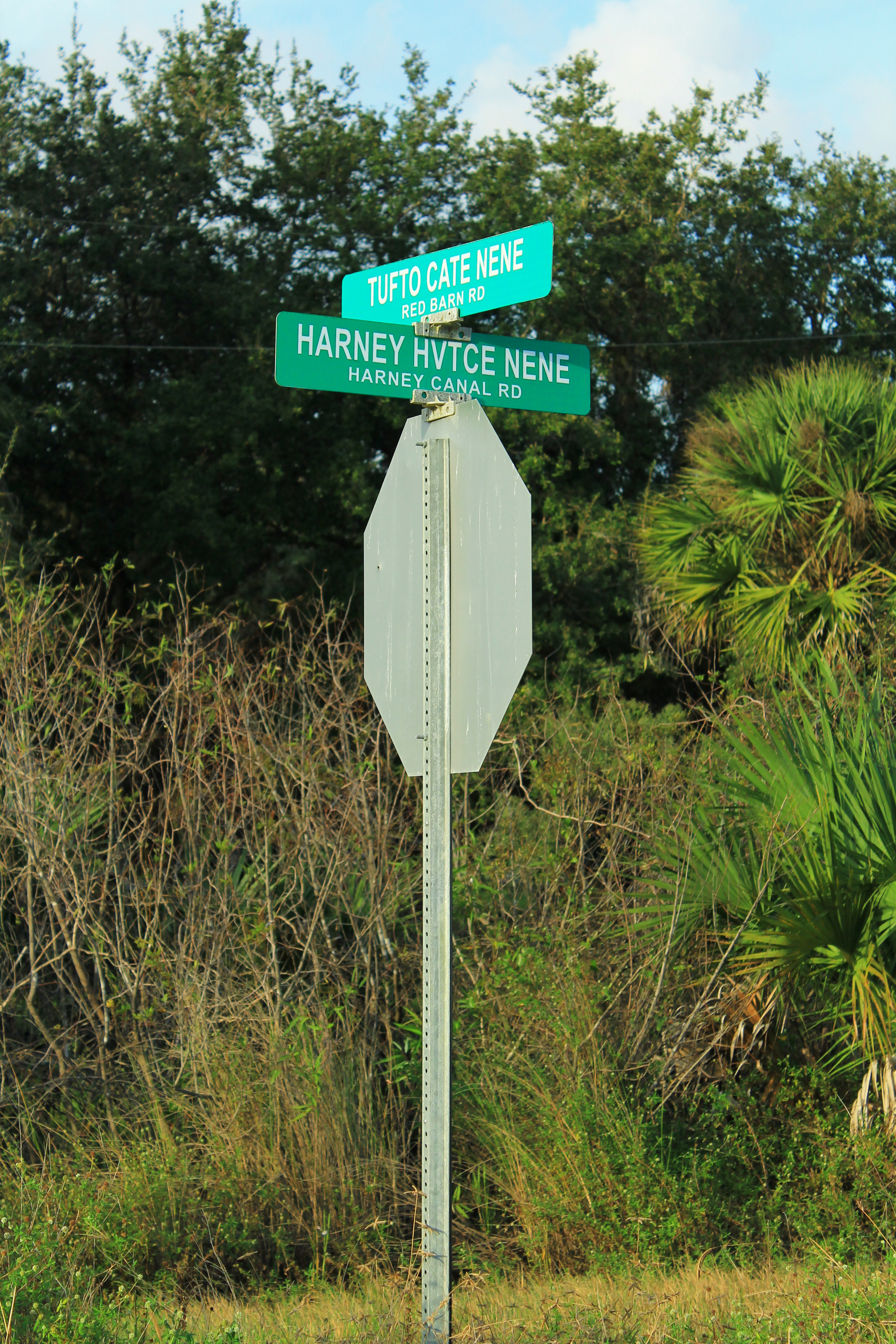
Roadsign at junction of Harney Hvtce Nene (Harvey Canal Trail) and Tufto Cate Nene in Brighton Reservation

Nene (pronounced nin-nee) is a word in the Muscogee language of the Seminole Indians meaning "path" or "trail."

In the city of Tallahassee, Florida, United States, it is often used as the name of streets and roads. In the Indianhead Acres area it is the norm.

Street names in Tallahassee
Street name	Meaning
Atapha Nene	Dogwood Trail
Atchena Nene	Cedar Trail
Chuli Nene	Pine Trail
Chocksaka Nene	Bridle Trail
Ohbah Nene	Owl Trail
Heechee Nene	Tobacco Trail
Hasosaw Nene	East Trail
Wahalaw Nene	North-South Trail
Humpin Nene	First Trail
Hokolin Nene	Second Trail
Toochin Nene	Third Trail
Ostin Nene	Fourth Trail
Chowkeebin Nene	Fifth Trail
Apakin Nene	Sixth Trail
Kolpakin Nene	Seventh Trail
Chinnapakin Nene	Eighth Trail
Wekewa Nene	Spring Trail

Road names of this style are found in other parts of Florida, such as in and around the Brighton Indian Reservation of the Seminole and related Miccosukee tribe.
