= Carnegie Library at FAMU =

Historic place in Florida, United States

- Carnegie Library
- U.S. National Register of Historic Places
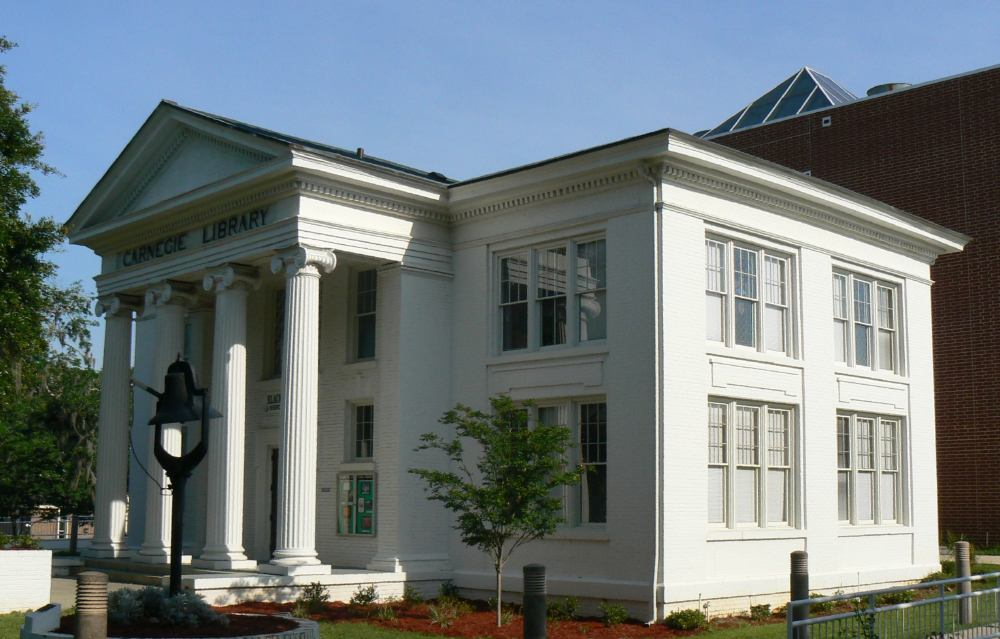
- FAMU's Carnegie Library

- Location within Florida Location within the United States
- Location: Tallahassee, Florida
- Coordinates: 30°25′39″N 84°17′11″W
- Built: 1908
- Architect: William Augustus Edwards
- Architectural style: Classical Revival
- NRHP reference No.: 78000949
- Added to NRHP: 17 November 1978

The Carnegie Library at FAMU is a historic building on the campus of Florida A&M University in Tallahassee, Florida. Built in 1908, the two-story, white-columned building was added to the National Register of Historic Places in 1996. "It was part of a national building program by philanthropist Andrew Carnegie." The Black Archives was established by the Florida Legislature in 1971 and opened in 1975. It was one of many public and college libraries funded by Andrew Carnegie, which were named Carnegie Library after him. It is the oldest brick building on the campus and the first Carnegie Library to be built on a black land-grant college campus.

Carnegie's library was built at what is today FAMU because the city of Tallahassee refused it, since under Carnegie's rules it would have had to serve black patrons (see History of Tallahassee, Florida#Black history). At the time, FAMU's predecessor, the State Normal and Industrial College for Colored Students, was in need of a new library. Its library had been located in the mansion of Florida Governor William Pope Duval, which burned in 1905. The Carnegie Library was built on the site of that mansion.

It was designed by architect William Augustus Edwards and was built in 1908. On November 17, 1978, it was added to the U.S. National Register of Historic Places.

== Carrie Meek-James N. Eaton, Sr. Southeastern Regional Black Archives Research Center and Museum ==
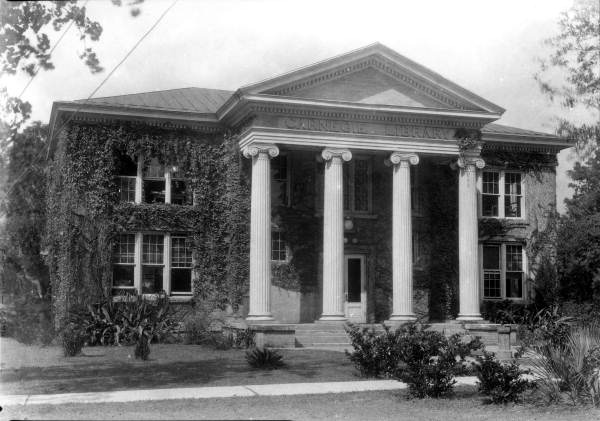
The library during the 1930s

In 1976, the Southeastern Regional Black Archives Research Center and Museum, formally known as the Florida Black Archives, was founded and occupied the library at Florida A&M. The archives expanded to the nearby Union Bank building in 1996 and a new building in 2006. The museum's exhibits focus on African American history in Florida, including the contributions of the African-American church, educational and social life at Florida A&M University, important figures in politics, science, medicine, and inventors, military experience and more.

The archives were "originally the Carnegie Library", and history professor and lecturer James N. Eaton "had the vision of not only collecting memorabilia but presenting it to the students and the public" in the early ‘ 1970s. By the fall of 1976, assembled the collection and arranged its exhibition.

In 2007, the archives was officially named in honor of veteran Florida legislator, retired U.S. Congresswoman and FAMU graduate Carrie P. Meek, who appropriated funds through Congress for the expansion of the facility, and Dr. James N. Eaton, D.H.L., Professor of History/Founder and first Director.

== See also ==
- National Register of Historic Places listings in Leon County, Florida
