= Lafayette Land Grant =

The Lafayette Land Grant was a gift by the government of the United States of just over 23,000 acres (93 km^{2}) of real estate in central Leon County, Florida, United States.

== Origins ==
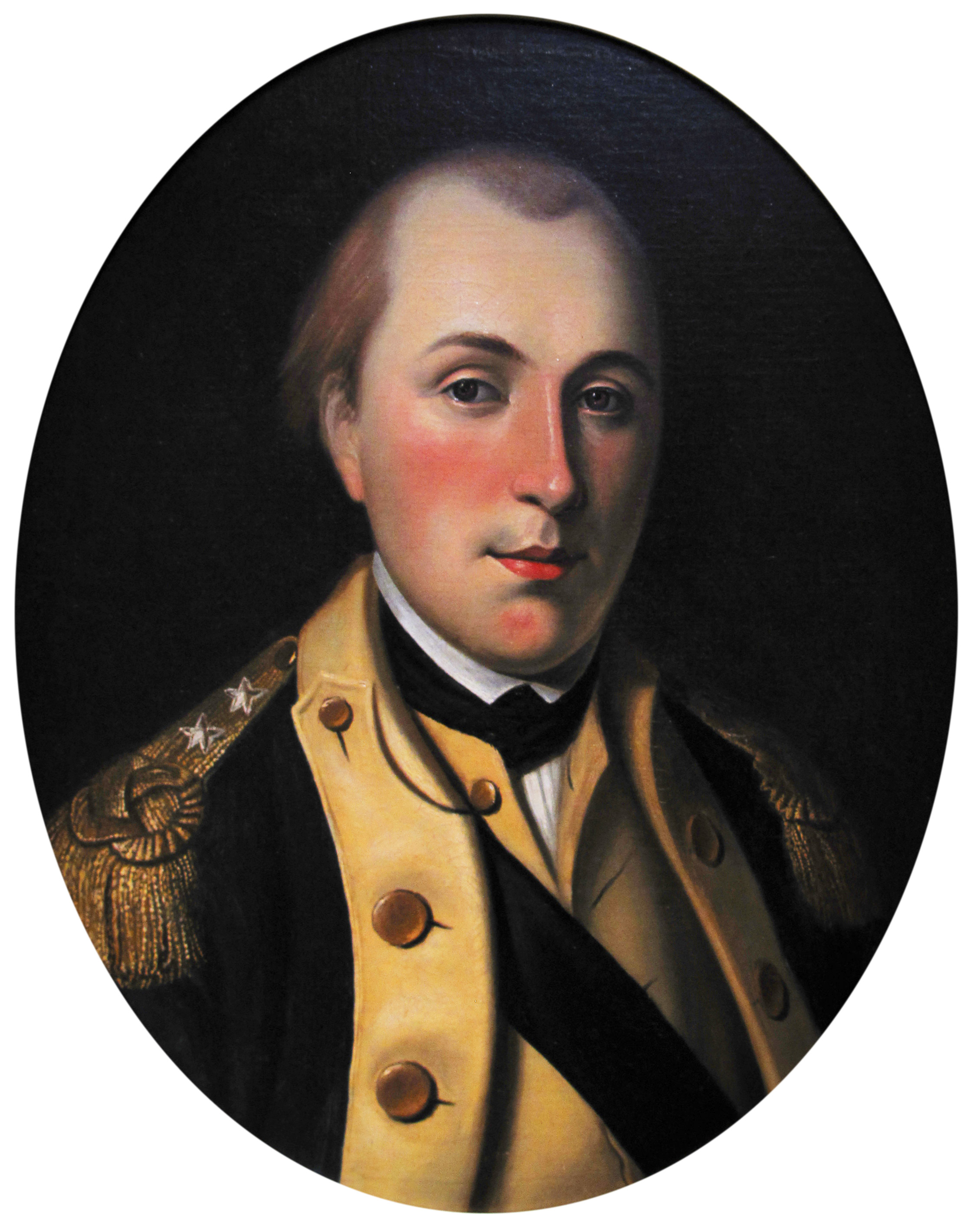
Marquis de Lafayette

During the American Revolution, Gilbert du Motier, Marquis de Lafayette loaned money to the government of the United States. To help Lafayette after the French Revolution, the United States gave the marquis $24,000 followed by land in what is now Louisiana in 1803. In 1824, another $200,000 and his choice of a township worth of land was given around the time of his visit to the United States in 1824-25.

== Settlement ==
Lafayette chose land near his friend Richard Keith Call. Col. John McKee of Alabama was given the task of traveling to Florida and selecting Lafayette's piece of land. The warrant officially giving Lafayette the land was signed by President John Quincy Adams on July 4, 1825. The land included what is now Lake Lafayette within that tract. The Southwest corner of the Lafayette grant is marked by a monument in Tallahassee, Florida, which also serves as a survey marker for the Tallahassee Meridian. Two additional markers also lay along the boundary -- one on Gadsden Street in the city's LaFayette Park and a second one between Apalachee Parkway and LaFayette St, at the intersection of E. Indianhead Drive.

Lafayette never visited his land in Florida. However, by the 1830s, several Frenchmen who knew Lafayette, including Prince Achille Murat, nephew of Napoleon Bonaparte, had moved to the area. They found north Florida's subtropical climate far too warm. Some of these settlers returned to France and others moved to the historically French city of New Orleans. By 1855, all the land included in the Lafayette Township (over 23,000 acres) had been sold to individual buyers. Today it is home to a number of neighborhoods, including Lafayette Oaks.
