= Florida State Road 363 =

Highway in Florida

State Road 363

Route information
- Maintained by FDOT
- Length: 20.198 mi (32.506 km)

Major junctions
- South end: Riverside Drive in St. Marks
- US 98 near St. Marks; SR 267 in Wakulla; US 319 near Woodville
- North end: SR 371 in Tallahassee

Location
- Country: United States
- State: Florida
- Counties: Wakulla, Leon

Highway system
- Florida State Highway System; Interstate; US; State; Former; Pre‑1945; Toll; Scenic
← SR 359A	→ SR 366

State Road 363 (SR 363) is a north–south route in the Big Bend region of Florida.

== Route description ==
The road begins in St. Marks at Riverside Drive. From there, the road progresses north, intersecting US 98 and State Road 267 before leaving Wakulla County. In Leon County and approaching Tallahassee, the road intersects US 319 and CR 259. Just north of CR 259, SR 363 shares a brief concurrency with State Road 61 before veering west one block of SR 61 and continuing north in Tallahassee, parraeeling SR 61 one block to the west. It crosses the CSX Railroad tracks in downtown Tallahassee on the M. S. Thomas Bridge. For the last four blocks of the highway, SR 363 becomes a one way pair, ending at State Road 371 near the state capitol.

== Major intersections ==
County	Location	mi	km	Destinations	Notes
Wakulla	St. Marks	0.000	0.000	Riverside Drive	
Wakulla		2.582	4.155	US 98 (SR 30) – Medart, Newport, Shell Point, Spring Creek, Live Oak Island, St. Marks National Wildlife Refuge	
Wakulla	Wakulla	5.596	9.006	SR 267 – Crawfordville, Newport, Edward Ball Wakulla Springs State Park, St. Marks National Wildlife Refuge	
Leon	Woodville	11.237	18.084	CR 2192 east (Natural Bridge Road) – Natural Bridge Battlefield Historic State Park	
Leon	Woodville	11.830	19.039	CR 2204 west (Oak Ridge Road)	
Leon	Tallahassee	15.800	25.428	US 319 (Capital Circle / SR 261 north / SR 263 north) to I-10 – Tallahassee Regional Airport, Thomasville, Crawfordville	
Leon	Tallahassee	17.448	28.080	Gaile Avenue (SR 61A west)	
Leon	Tallahassee	17.733	28.538	CR 259 east (Tram Road)	
Leon	Tallahassee	17.940	28.872	SR 61 north (South Monroe Street)	South end of SR 61 overlap
Leon	Tallahassee	18.124	29.168	SR 61 south (Adams Street)	North end of SR 61 overlap
Leon	Tallahassee	18.636	29.992	SR 373 (West Orange Avenue) – Airport, Tallahassee Museum of History and Natural Science	
Leon	Tallahassee	20.198	32.506	SR 371 (Gaines Street)	
1.000 mi = 1.609 km; 1.000 km = 0.621 mi
