= List of county roads in Wakulla County, Florida =

List of country roads in Wakulla County, Florida

- County road shields used in Florida

Highway names
- Interstates: Interstate X (I-X)
- US Highways: U.S. Highway X (US X)
- State: State Road X (SR X)
- County: County Road X (CR-X)

System links
- County roads in Florida; County roads in Wakulla County

The following is a list of county roads in Wakulla County, Florida. All county roads are maintained by the county in which they reside.

== County routes in Wakulla County ==
Route	Road Name(s)	From	To	Notes
CR 22	Rose Street	CR 375 in Sopchoppy	West of Sopchoppy	Former SR 22
CR 59	Lighthouse Road	St. Marks Light	US 98 at Newport	Former SR 59
CR 61	Shadeville Highway, Wakulla Springs Road	US 319 in Crawfordville	Wakulla-Leon County Line	Former SR 61
CR 299	Curtis Mill Road	US 319 in Curtis Mill	CR 375 west of Sopchoppy	Former SR 299
CR 365	Spring Creek Highway Shadeville Highway	Spring Creek Marina at Spring Creek CR 61 west of Wakulla	SR 267 in Bethel SR 267 in Wakulla	Former SR 365
CR 367	Shell Point Road	Beaty Taff Drive in Shell Point	County Road 365	Former SR 367
CR 367A	Live Oak Island Road	Live Oak Island	County Road 367	Former SR 367A
CR 368	Forest Highway 13, Arran Road	Wakulla-Liberty County Line	US 319 in Crawfordville	Former SR 368
CR 372	Surf Road, Mashes Sands Road	US 319 in Sopchoppy	Gulf of Mexico at Mashes Sands	Former SR 372
CR 372A	Otter Lake Road, Bottoms Road	Otter Lake west of Panacea	Dickerson Bay east of Panacea	Former SR 372A. Discontinuous; not on 2019 map.
CR 372B	Levy Bay Road	US 98 in Panacea	Levy Bay south of Panacea	Former SR 372B. Not on 2019 map.
CR 373	Springhill Road	SR 267 in Hilliardville	Wakulla-Leon County Line	Former SR 373
CR 373A	New Light Church Road	CR 373 north of Hilliardville	US 319	Former SR 373A. Unsigned.
CR 374	Harvey Mill Road	Forest Road 356 at Lawhons Mill	US 319 south of Crawfordville	Former SR 374
CR 375	Jack Crum Road Smith Creek Road, Rose Street	CR 365 north of Spring Creek US 319 in Medart	US 98 / US 319 Wakulla–Leon County Line	Former SR 375
