= Florida State Road 61 =

State highway in Florida, United States

State Road 61

Route information
- Maintained by FDOT
- Length: 57.477 mi (92.500 km) including CR 61
- Existed: 1945–present

Major junctions
- South end: US 98 near Ochlockonee Bay
- US 319 in Crawfordville; US 27 / US 90 in Tallahassee; I-10 in Tallahassee
- North end: US 319 / SR 35 towards Thomasville, GA

Location
- Country: United States
- State: Florida
- Counties: Wakulla, Leon

Highway system
- Florida State Highway System; Interstate; US; State; Former; Pre‑1945; Toll; Scenic
← SR 60	→ SR 61A

State Road 61 (SR 61) is located in the Big Bend area of Florida, running through the state capital of Florida, Tallahassee. Throughout most of its length, SR 61 is the unsigned state route assigned to U.S. Route 319. The route's southern terminus is at US 98, and its northern terminus is at the Georgia state line, where it continues north as Georgia State Route 35.

== Route description ==
SR 61 begins at US 98 as an unsigned route, heading north on US 319, until it splits off with the highway in Crawfordville and becomes County Road 61. It turns east towards Shadeville Highway (former State Road 365), where afterwards, it runs north as Wakulla Springs Road.

The main, signed portion of SR 61 begins at the Leon County line, where it continues north and eventually rejoins US 319 just south of Capital Circle. Heading north towards the capitol building, it meets State Road 363 and swaps roads, with SR 61 crossing over to Crawfordville Road and continuing north as Adams Street. The swapping ends at Paul Russell Road and then joins with US 27 as Monroe Street. SR 61 leaves downtown Tallahassee as Thomasville Road and just north of its intersection with I-10 at exit 203, it reunites with US 319 and heads north. US 319 and SR 61 stay concurrent from there until the road ends at the Georgia state line and continues there as State Route 35.

== Major intersections ==
County	Location	mi	km	Destinations	Notes
Wakulla	Ochlockonee Bay	0.000	0.000	base of Ochlockonee Bay Bridge	
Wakulla	see US 98 (mile 221.013-230.350), US 319 (mile 48.654-55.429)				
Wakulla	Crawfordville	14.553	23.421	US 319 north (SR 369) – Tallahassee	north end of US 319 overlap; north end of state maintenance
Wakulla	Shadeville	26.4	42.5	CR 365 south (Spring Creek Highway) – Shell Point, Spring Creek, Live Oak Island	
Wakulla		21.188	34.099	CR 365 north	
Wakulla		32.3	52.0	SR 267 – Edward Ball Wakulla Springs State Park	
Wakulla–Leon county line		28.773	46.306	south end of state maintenance	
Leon		30.249	48.681	CR 2204 (Oak Ridge Road)	
Leon		32.055	51.588	US 319 south (SR 369) – Crawfordville	south end of US 319 overlap; no left turn northbound
Leon	Tallahassee	34.052	54.801	US 319 north / SR 263 west (Capital Circle) to I-10 – Tallahassee Regional Airport, Thomasville	north end of US 319 overlap
Leon	Tallahassee	35.693	57.442	Gaile Avenue (SR 61A east)	
Leon	Tallahassee	36.256	58.348	SR 363 north (Adams Street)	south end of SR 363 overlap
Leon	Tallahassee	36.440	58.644	SR 363 south (South Monroe Street)	north end of SR 363 overlap
Leon	Tallahassee	36.939	59.448	SR 373 west / CR 373 east (East Orange Avenue) – Airport, Tallahassee Museum of History and Natural Science	
Leon	Tallahassee	37.450	60.270	CR 265 north (East Magnolia Drive)	
Leon	Tallahassee	38.523	61.997	SR 371 west / CR 1555 north (Gaines Street)	
Leon	Tallahassee	38.706	62.291	US 27 south (Apalachee Parkway)	south end of US 27 overlap
Leon	Tallahassee	38.807	62.454	SR 366 west (Jefferson Street)	
Leon	Tallahassee	39.159	63.020	US 90 (Tennessee Street / SR 10 / SR 20 west) – Florida State University, Quincy, Monticello	north end of SR 20 overlap
Leon	Tallahassee	39.545	63.642	US 27 north (Monroe Street / SR 63) – Havana	north end of US 27 overlap
Leon	Tallahassee	39.638	63.791	CR 1559 south (Calhoun Street)	
Leon	Tallahassee	40.101	64.536	SR 155 north (Meridian Road)	southbound access only
Leon	Tallahassee	43.510	70.023	To I-10 east / US 319 south / Raymond Diehl Road (SR 162 east) – Lake City	
Leon	Tallahassee	43.56	70.10	I-10 west (SR 8) – Regional Airport, Pensacola	I-10 exit 203
Leon	Tallahassee	43.778	70.454	CR 0352 west (Timberlane Road) / Killearn Center Boulevard (SR 160 east)	
Leon	Tallahassee	43.922	70.686	US 319 south (Capital Circle Northeast / SR 261) to I-10 east	south end of US 319 overlap
Leon	see US 319 (mile 83.236-96.791)				
Leon		57.477	92.500	US 319 north / SR 35 north – Thomasville	Georgia state line
1.000 mi = 1.609 km; 1.000 km = 0.621 mi: Concurrency terminus; Route transition

== Florida State Road 61A ==
State Road 61A
- Gaile Avenue
- Location: Tallahassee
- Length: 0.103 mi (166 m)

State Road 61A (SR 61A) is a 0.103-mile-long (0.166 km) state highway in Tallahassee, Leon County, Florida that connects Florida State Road 61 and Florida State Road 363 in southern Tallahassee. SR 61A is unsigned throughout.

=== Major intersections ===
The entire route is in Tallahassee, Leon County.

mi	km	Destinations	Notes
0.000	0.000	SR 61 (Crawfordville Road) / Ridge Road	Western terminus; continues beyond SR 61 as Ridge Road
0.103	0.166	SR 363 (Woodville Highway)	Eastern terminus; continues beyond FL 363 as Gaile Avenue
1.000 mi = 1.609 km; 1.000 km = 0.621 mi
