= U.S. Route 319 =

Highway in the United States

U.S. Route 319
- US 319 highlighted in red

Route information
- Auxiliary route of US 19
- Length: 303.052 mi (487.715 km)
- Existed: 1933–present

Major junctions
- South end: US 98 in Apalachicola, FL
- US 27 / US 90 in Tallahassee, FL; I-10 in Tallahassee, FL; US 19 / US 84 in Thomasville, GA; I-75 in Tifton, GA; US 41 / US 82 in Tifton, GA; US 23 / US 280 / US 341 in McRae-Helena, GA; I-16 near Dublin, GA; US 80 / US 441 in Dublin, GA
- North end: US 1 / SR 4 / SR 78 in Wadley, GA

Location
- Country: United States
- States: Florida, Georgia
- Counties: FL: Franklin, Wakulla, Leon; GA: Grady, Thomas, Colquitt, Tift, Irwin, Ben Hill, Coffee, Telfair, Wheeler, Dodge, Laurens, Johnson, Jefferson

Highway system
- United States Numbered Highway System; List; Special; Divided
← SR 312	FL	→ SR 320
← SR 318	GA	→ SR 319
← SR 253	SR 261	→ SR 262
← SR 368	SR 369	→ SR 371
← I-375	SR 375; SR 377	→ SR 384
← SR 34	SR 35	→ SR 36

U.S. Route 319 (US 319) is a spur of US 19. It runs for 303 miles (488 km) from US 98 at the foot of the John Gorrie Memorial Bridge across from downtown Apalachicola, Florida to US 1/SR 4 in Wadley, Georgia, through the Panhandle of Florida and the southern portion of Georgia.

== Route description ==
A US 319 shield used in Florida prior to 1993

=== Florida ===
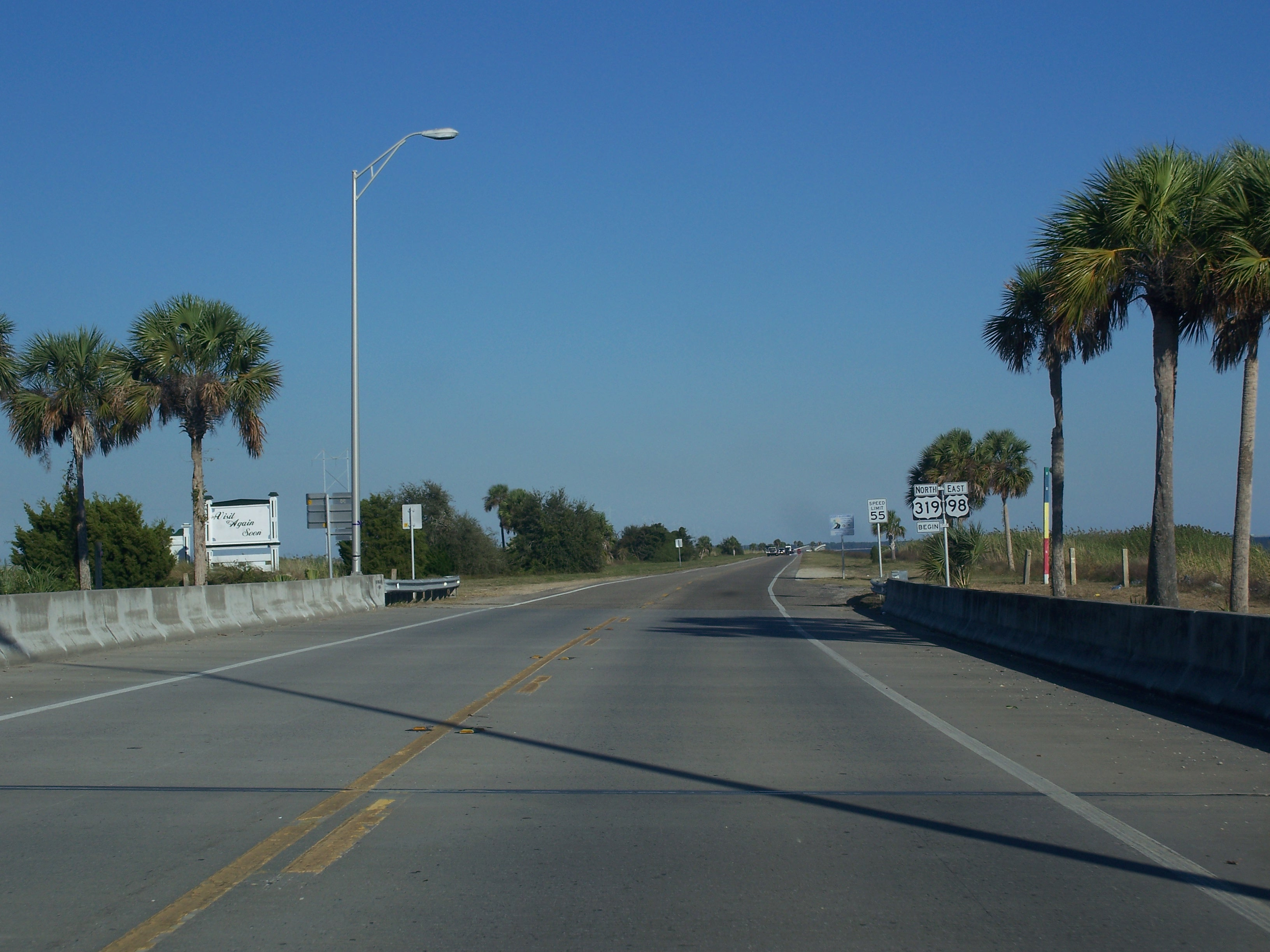
Beginning of US 319 north at the John Gorrie Bridge in Apalachicola, FL

The route starts as a two-lane highway at the eastern end of US 98's bridge over the Apalachicola River near the John Gorrie Bridge in Apalachicola, Florida, and is concurrent with US 98 from its starting point. After crossing the East Bay portion of Apalachicola Bay via the John Gorrie Bridge, US 319 runs along the Gulf coast of Florida's Panhandle to Carabelle in Franklin County, and departs the coast, and its concurrency with US 98, about halfway between Carrabelle and Bald Point State Park, in a north direction through Sopchoppy in Wakulla County.

In Sopchoppy, the route angles east, briefly meets up with US 98 once more, before parting ways again and running north through Crawfordville, where it receives the FDOT maintenance designation of State Road 369, into Tallahassee in Leon County. US 319 meets SR 61 just south of Tallahassee, marking the northern end of SR 369, where it becomes a 4-lane divided highway, which turns into 6 lanes as the route meets SR 263 and forms part of the southern and eastern portion of the Capital Circle around Tallahassee. US 319 has the unsigned SR 261 designation between State Road 363/Woodville Highway and Capital Circle's eastern terminus at State Road 61/Thomasville Road. US 319/SR 61 has a complex interchange with I-10 at exit 203 before heading northeast out of the Tallahassee area. US 319 again becomes a 4-lane divided highway at its intersection with County Road 0342 about 9 miles (14 km) from I-10, and runs to the state line with Georgia.

=== Georgia ===
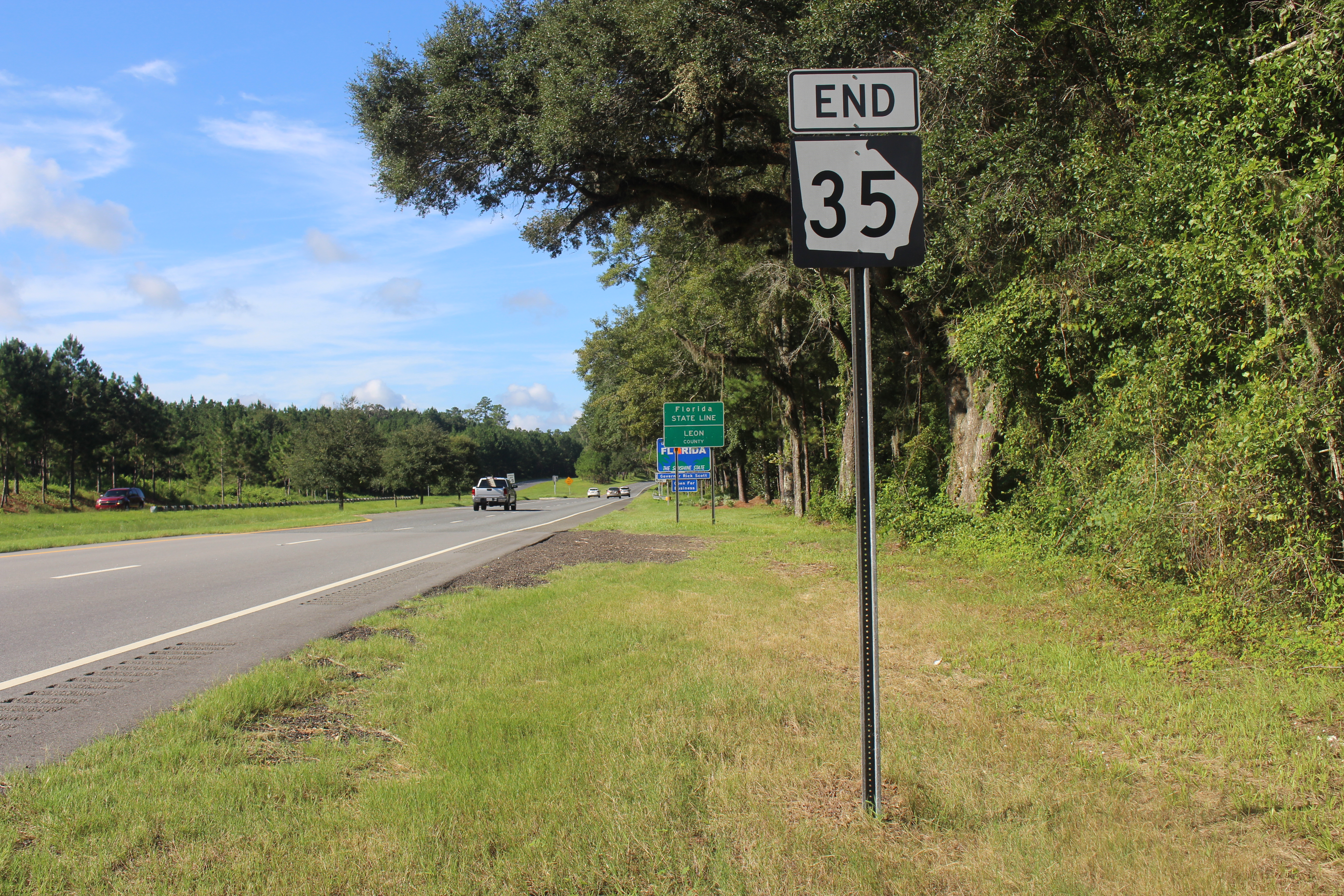
US 319 entering Tallahassee, Florida at the southern terminus of Georgia SR 35 From Thomasville, Georgia.

The route bypasses Grady County and enters Thomas County co-signed with SR 35 at the intersection of SR 93 and travels northeast in the direction of Thomasville in Thomas County, where the route forms the western and northern perimeter around Thomasville. US 319 then continues northeast, passes through Coolidge, and crosses into Colquitt County, running as a bypass around the east of Moultrie. The route crosses into Tift County and intersects with I-75 just before running through Tifton.

In Ocilla, US 319/SR 35 is concurrent with SR 32, Half a mile later, US 319 turns north and is concurrent with US 129 while SR 35 reach its terminus. US 319 And US 129 head into Ben Hill County and through Fitzgerald, where it splits from US 129 and first heads east, and then north through the northwestern corner of Coffee County, where it meets up and is co-signed with US 441, and crosses the Ocmulgee River into Telfair County, Georgia at Jacksonville, Georgia and on into McRae-Helena. After briefly traversing the western corner of Wheeler County and eastern corner of Dodge County, US 319 continues north through Laurens County, crossing I-16 just before heading into and through Dublin and East Dublin, where US 441 splits off.

Continuing northeast, the route heads into Johnson County, runs through Wrightsville, and heads into southern Jefferson County, where it turns east in Bartow, before meeting its northern terminus at US 1 and SR 4 in Wadley.

US 319 from Tifton to the Florida State Line is a GRIP corridor.

=== National Highway System ===
The following portions of US 319 and SR 35 are part of the National Highway System, a system of routes determined to be the most important for the nation's economy, mobility, and defense:

- US 319/SR 35:
  - From its southern terminus in Apalachicola to just north of the concurrency with US 82/SR 520 just east of Tifton
- US 319 only:
  - From the southern end of the SR 32 concurrency in Ocilla to about Fitzgerald
  - The entire length of the US 441 concurrency, from south of Jacksonville to Dublin.

== History ==
Florida

The entire length of US 319 in Franklin County was designated as "Blue Star Memorial Highway" by the Florida State Legislature in 1957.

The section of US 319 that is co-signed with US 98 and SR 30 in Medart in Wakulla County was designated as "Agnes Morrison Memorial Highway" by the Florida State Legislature in 1961.

From Kinhega Drive, about 9 miles (14 km) north of its intersection with I-10 in Leon County, to the Georgia state line, US 319 and SR 61 were designated as "Kate Ireland Parkway" by the Florida State Legislature in 1992.

Georgia

US 319 does not make an appearance on Georgia road maps until October 1937, when the spur from the Florida state line to Thomasville is shown, co-signed with SR 3. Prior to October 1937, US 19 appears as the designation of this section of the route.

In July 1941, US 319 was extended from Thomasville, and ran through Moultrie, following what was signed as SR 35 at the time, to Cordele, co-signed with the current route taken by SR 33 from Moultrie. Since late in 1946, US 319 follows its current route.

The section of US 319 that forms the Thomasville Bypass was designated as "Will Watt Parkway" in 1996 after a prominent resident of Thomasville.

The section of US 319 that forms the east bypass around Moultrie in Colquitt County was designated as "Veterans Parkway" in 2002.

== Major intersections ==
State	County	Location	mi	km	Destinations	Notes
Florida	Franklin	Apalachicola	0.000	0.000	US 98 west (SR 30) – Panama City	Southern terminus; base of John Gorrie Memorial Bridge over Apalachicola River
Florida	Franklin	see US 98 (mile 177.980-209.555)				
Florida	Franklin		31.575	50.815	US 98 east (SR 30) – Panacea	Northern end of US 98/SR 30 concurrency; southern end of SR 377 concurrency
Florida	Franklin		36.811	59.242	CR 370 east (Rio Vista Drive)	Western terminus of CR 370
Florida	Wakulla		38.029	61.202	CR 299 north (Curtis Mill Road)	Southern terminus of CR 299
Florida	Wakulla	Sopchoppy	42.204	67.921	Rose Street (CR 375 north) – Downtown Sopchoppy, Sanborn	Northern end of SR 377 concurrency; southern end of SR 375 concurrency
Florida	Wakulla	Sopchoppy	42.908	69.054	CR 372 east (Surf Road)	Western terminus of CR 372
Florida	Wakulla	Medart	48.654	78.301	US 98 west (SR 30 west / SR 61 south) – Panacea, Alligator Point, Mashes Sands Beach	Southern end of US 98/SR 30 and SR 61 concurrencies; northern end of SR 375 concurrency
Florida	Wakulla	Tully	50.119	80.659	CR 375 south (Jack Crum Road)	Northern terminus of CR 375
Florida	Wakulla	Tully	50.213	80.810	US 98 east (Coastal Highway / SR 30) – Shell Point, Spring Creek, Newport	Northern end of US 98/SR 30 concurrency
Florida	Wakulla		54.659	87.965	Harvey Mill Road (CR 374 west)	
Florida	Wakulla	Crawfordville	55.394	89.148	Arran Road (CR 368 west)	
Florida	Wakulla	Crawfordville	55.429	89.204	CR 61 north (Shadeville Highway) – Wakulla	Northern end of SR 61 concurrency; southern end of SR 369 concurrency; southern terminus of CR 61
Florida	Wakulla		61.516	99.000	SR 267 to SR 20 – Wakulla	
Florida	Leon		66.187	106.518	CR 2204 east (Oak Ridge Road)	Western terminus of CR 2204
Florida	Leon		68.469	110.190	SR 61 south (Wakulla Springs Road) – Wakulla Springs	Northern end of SR 369 concurrency; southern end of SR 61 concurrency
Florida	Leon	Tallahassee	70.466	113.404	SR 61 north (Crawfordville Highway) / SR 263 west (Capital Circle) to I-10 west – Tallahassee, Tallahassee Regional Airport	Northern end of SR 61 concurrency; southern end of SR 263 concurrency
Florida	Leon	Tallahassee	71.796	115.544	SR 363 (Woodville Highway) – Woodville, Tallahassee	Northern end of SR 263 concurrency; southern end of SR 261 concurrency
Florida	Leon	Tallahassee	74.014	119.114	CR 259 (Tram Road Southeast)	
Florida	Leon	Tallahassee	76.895	123.751	Old St. Augustine Road (CR 2196)	
Florida	Leon	Tallahassee	77.404	124.570	US 27 (Apalachee Parkway / SR 20) – Tallahassee, Perry, Civic Center	
Florida	Leon	Tallahassee	79.668	128.213	US 90 (Mahan Drive / SR 10) to I-10 east – Downtown Tallahassee, Monticello	
Florida	Leon	Tallahassee	80.370	129.343	CR 146 west / CR 0347 east (Miccosukee Road) – Goodwood Gardens and Museum	Eastern terminus of CR 146; western terminus of CR 0347
Florida	Leon	Tallahassee	81.066	130.463	CR 151 (Centerville Road)	
Florida	Leon	Tallahassee	82.781	133.223	To I-10 east / Raymond Diehl Road (SR 162 west) – Lake City	
Florida	Leon	Tallahassee	82.89	133.40	I-10 west (SR 8) – Pensacola	I-10 exit 203
Florida	Leon	Tallahassee	83.125	133.777	To I-10 / Killearn Center Boulevard (SR 160 west)	Interchange southbound; intersection northbound
Florida	Leon	Tallahassee	83.236	133.955	SR 61 south (Thomasville Road) to I-10 – Downtown Tallahassee	Northern end of SR 261 concurrency; southern end of SR 61 concurrency; interchange southbound on Veterans Memorial Bridge; intersection northbound
Florida	Leon	Tallahassee	85.636	137.818	CR 0346 west (Ox Bottom Road)	Eastern terminus of CR 0346
Florida	Leon	Bradfordville	87.465	140.761	CR 0342 (Bannerman Road / Bradfordville Road)	
Florida	Leon	Iamonia	95.740	154.079	CR 12 west – Tall Timbers Research Station & Land Conservancy	Eastern terminus of CR 12
Florida	Leon		96.107	154.669	CR 0338 east (Sunnyhill Road)	Western terminus of CR 0338
			96.791 0.000	155.770 0.000	Florida–Georgia state line; northern end of FL SR 61 concurrency; southern end of GA SR 35 concurrency	
Georgia	Grady	Beachton	2.592	4.171	SR 93 north – Cairo	Southern terminus of SR 93
Georgia	Thomas	Thomasville	13.162	21.182	Metcalf Road – Metcalf	Former SR 122 west
Georgia	Thomas		17.345	27.914	US 84 west (North Thomasville Bypass) / SR 38 west / Dixie Highway north – Cairo	Southern end of US 84/SR 38 concurrency; southern terminus of Dixie Highway Scenic Byway
Georgia	Thomas		17.714	28.508	US 84 Bus. east / SR 38 Bus. east / SR 3 Alt. north / Dixie Highway – Ochlocknee, Thomasville	Southern end of SR 3 Alt. concurrency; western terminus of US 84 Bus./SR 38 Bus.
Georgia	Thomas		20.386	32.808	US 19 / US 84 east / SR 3 / SR 38 east / SR 300 (Georgia-Florida Parkway) / SR 3 Alt. ends – Albany, Valdosta, Thomasville	Northern end of US 84/SR 38 and SR 3 Alt. concurrencies; southern terminus of SR 3 Alt.
Georgia	Thomas	Thomasville	21.471	34.554	SR 35 Conn. south (East Jackson Street) – Downtown Thomasville	Northern terminus of SR 35 Conn.
Georgia	Thomas	Coolidge	32.116	51.686	SR 188 (Japonica Avenue) – Cairo, Pavo	
Georgia	Colquitt	Moultrie	40.885	65.798	US 319 Bus. north / SR 33 (Thomasville Road north / Pavo Road south) – Moultrie, Pavo	Southern terminus of US 319 Bus.
Georgia	Colquitt	Moultrie	45.443	73.133	SR 37 west / SR 133 south (1st Avenue Southeast) – Quitman, Moultrie, Camilla, Shorterville	Southern end of SR 37 and SR 133 concurrencies
Georgia	Colquitt	Moultrie	46.192	74.339	SR 37 east – Adel, Reed Bingham State Park	Northern end of SR 37 concurrency
Georgia	Colquitt	Moultrie	47.995	77.240	US 319 Bus. south / SR 33 / SR 133 north (Tifton Highway / East Bypass) – Sylvester, Albany, Moultrie	Northern end of SR 133 concurrency; northern terminus of US 319 Bus.
Georgia	Colquitt	Norman Park	55.762	89.740	SR 256 north – Sylvester	Southern terminus of SR 256
Georgia	Tift		70.969	114.214	SR 35 Conn. east (Old Omega Road) to I-75 – Valdosta, Macon	Western terminus of SR 35 Conn.
Georgia	Tift	Tifton	71.695	115.382	US 82 west / SR 520 west to I-75 – Albany, Sylvester, Macon, Valdosta	Southern end of US 82/SR 520 concurrency
Georgia	Tift	Tifton	72.846	117.234	US 41 / SR 7 / SR 125 (Main Street) – Adel, Nashville, Ashburn, Fitzgerald	
Georgia	Tift		74.250	119.494	US 82 east / SR 520 east – Brookfield, Alapaha, Waycross	Northern end of US 82/SR 520 concurrency
Georgia	Irwin	Ocilla	91.696	147.570	SR 32 west to I-75 – Ashburn, Leesburg, Jefferson Davis State Historic Site	Southern end of SR 32 concurrency
Georgia	Irwin	Ocilla	92.314	148.565	US 129 south / SR 11 south / SR 32 east / SR 90 south / SR 35 ends – Douglas, Alapaha, South Georgia College	Northern terminus of SR 35; northern end of SR 32 and SR 35 concurrencies; southern end of US 129/SR 11/SR 90 concurrency
Georgia	Ben Hill	Fitzgerald	99.426	160.011	US 129 north / SR 11 north / SR 90 north / SR 107 west to I-75 – Ashburn, Fitzgerald	Northern end of US 129/SR 11/SR 90 concurrency; southern end of SR 107 concurrency
Georgia	Ben Hill		103.750	166.969	SR 206 east – Douglas	Western terminus of SR 206
Georgia	Ben Hill		111.726	179.806	SR 182 west – Bowens Mill	Eastern terminus of SR 182
Georgia	Coffee		118.913	191.372	US 441 south / SR 31 south / SR 107 east – Broxton, Douglas	Northern end of SR 107 concurrency; southern end of US 441/SR 31 concurrency
Georgia	Telfair	Jacksonville	121.459	195.469	SR 117 – Rhine, Lumber City	
Georgia	Telfair	McRae-Helena	137.817	221.795	SR 149 Conn. south	Northern terminus of SR 149 Conn.
Georgia	Telfair	McRae-Helena	138.426	222.775	SR 132 south	Northern terminus of SR 132
Georgia	Telfair	McRae-Helena	138.723	223.253	US 280 west / SR 30 west – Milan	Southern end of US 280/SR 30 concurrency
Georgia	Telfair	McRae-Helena	140.154	225.556	US 23 south / US 341 south / SR 27 south (Oak Street) – Lumber City, Hazlehurst	Southbound lanes of US 23/US 341/SR 27 on one-way pair
Georgia	Telfair	McRae-Helena	140.211	225.648	US 23 north / US 341 north / SR 27 north (MLK Jr Boulevard) – Eastman	Northbound lanes of US 23/US 341/SR 27 on one-way pair
Georgia	Wheeler		141.802	228.208	US 280 east / SR 30 east – Alamo	Northern end of US 280/SR 30 concurrency
Georgia	Dodge	No major junctions				
Georgia	Laurens		153.799	247.515	SR 46 / SR 126 – Eastman, Soperton	
Georgia	Laurens		166.095	267.304	SR 117 south – Rentz	Southern end of SR 117 concurrency
Georgia	Laurens	Dublin	170.412	274.252	I-16 (SR 404) – Macon, Savannah	I-16 exit 51
Georgia	Laurens	Dublin	171.358	275.774	US 441 Byp. north / SR 117 north	Northern end of SR 117 concurrency; southern terminus of US 441 Byp.
Georgia	Laurens	Dublin	173.591	279.368	SR 257 south (Joiner Street) – Dexter	Northern terminus of SR 257
Georgia	Laurens	Dublin	174.440	280.734	US 441 north / SR 19 (Jefferson Street)	Northern end of US 441 concurrency
Georgia	Laurens	Dublin	174.794	281.304	US 80 west / SR 26 west – Dudley	Southern end of US 80/SR 26 concurrency
Georgia	Laurens	East Dublin	176.675	284.331	US 80 east / SR 26 east – Adrian	Northern end of US 80/SR 26 concurrency
Georgia	Johnson	Wrightsville	192.839	310.344	SR 15 / SR 31 ends / SR 57 / SR 78 south	Northern end of SR 31 concurrency; northern terminus of SR 31; southern end of SR 78 concurrency
Georgia	Jefferson		208.168	335.014	US 221 south / SR 171 south	Southern end of US 221/SR 171 concurrency
Georgia	Jefferson	Bartow	211.404	340.222	SR 242 west – Riddleville	Eastern terminus of SR 242
Georgia	Jefferson	Bartow	211.760	340.795	US 221 north / SR 171 north	Northern end of US 221/SR 171 concurrency
Georgia	Jefferson	Wadley	215.932	347.509	US 1 Bus. / SR 4 Bus. (Main Street) – Swainsboro, Louisville	
Georgia	Jefferson	Wadley	216.486	348.400	US 1 / SR 4 / SR 78 north – Swainsboro, Louisville, Midville, Millen	Northern terminus; northern end of SR 78 concurrency
1.000 mi = 1.609 km; 1.000 km = 0.621 mi: Concurrency terminus

== Special route ==
=== Moultrie business loop ===
U.S. Highway 319 Business
- Location: Moultrie
- Length: 6.8 mi (10.9 km)

U.S. Route 319 Business (US 319 Bus.) is a 6.8-mile-long (10.9 km) business route for US 319 that travels through the central portion of Moultrie. It is concurrent with SR 33 for its entire length.

US 319 Bus. begins at an intersection with US 319/SR 35 (Veterans Parkway) and SR 33 (Pavo Road) in the south-central part of Moultrie. US 319 Bus. and SR 33 travel concurrently as South Main Street to the north-northwest and immediately curve to the north-northeast. An intersection with 32nd Avenue SE leads to Colquitt Regional Medical Center. One block later, an intersection with 31st Avenue leads to the hospital, as well. Just past an intersection with the eastern terminus of Hugh Bannister Drive, they begin a curve back to the north-northwest. Just south of an intersection with the northern terminus of Lower Meigs Road, the highways curve back to the north-northeast. An intersection with 11th Avenue leads to the Jim Buck Goff Recreation Complex. At 4th Avenue, the northbound lanes of US 319 and SR 33 turn right and travel to the east, while the southbound lanes stay on South Main Street. South Main Street remains a two-way street until 2nd Avenue SE. One block later, they turn left onto 1st Street SE and continue their northern direction. On the southeastern corner of the intersection with 2nd Avenue SE lies the main office for Southwest Georgia Bank.

One block later, at 1st Avenue SE, they intersect the eastbound lanes of SR 37. Just north of this intersection, they pass the Colquitt County Courthouse. One block later, they intersect the westbound lanes of SR 37 (East Central Avenue). On the northeastern corner of this intersection lies the annex for the county courthouse. Here, 1st Street SE changes to 1st Street NE. At this same point, South Main Street changes back to a two-way street. At an intersection with 1st Avenue NE, 1st Street NE becomes a two-way street. On the southwestern corner of an intersection with 2nd Avenue NE lies the municipal building. On the northeaster corner lies the annex for the municipal building. Just north of 9th Avenue NE, they travel on a bridge over some railroad tracks of Norfolk Southern Railway (NS). North of Sylvester Drive, they have a roundabout with Sylvester Highway and the southbound lanes of US 319 Bus./SR 33. Just south of this roundabout is a sign for SR 33 south, even though it is actually still on Main Street. In fact, there is a directional sign in the roundabout that says that 1st Street NE is SR 33 south. The reunited lanes travel to the northeast. They cross over Okapilco Creek before they meet their northern terminus, an intersection with US 319/SR 35/SR 133 (Veterans Parkway/Tifton Highway). Here, SR 33 turns left onto East Bypass, concurrent with SR 133.

Between 2nd Avenue NE and 4th Avenue NW, they pass the U.S. post office for the city. Whereas the northbound lanes travel on a bridge over the NS line, the southbound lanes actually meet them at a railroad crossing. Just south of Sylvester Drive, the southbound lanes have an intersection with SR 111 (West Bypass NW). SR 111 does not meet the northbound lanes, or vice versa. Just north of Sylvester Drive, northbound Main Street has signage that indicates that it is northbound US 319 Bus./SR 33, although they are actually on 1st Street NE.

The entire length of US 319 Bus., and the portion of SR 33 concurrent with it, is part of the National Highway System, a system of routes determined to be the most important for the nation's economy, mobility, and defense.

The entire route is in Moultrie, Colquitt County.

mi	km	Destinations	Notes
0.0	0.0	US 319 / SR 35 (Veterans Parkway) / SR 33 south (Pavo Road) – Moultrie, Thomasville, Tifton, Pavo, Coolidge, Moultrie Tech College	Southern end of SR 33 concurrency; southern terminus; roadway continues as SR 33 south (Pavo Road).
4.6	7.4	SR 37 east (1st Avenue SE) – Quitman	One-way pair
4.6	7.4	SR 37 west (East Central Avenue)	One-way pair
5.8	9.3	SR 111 south (West Bypass NW) – Meigs, Camilla, Cairo	No access from US 319 Bus. north/SR 33 north to SR 111 or vice versa; northern terminus of SR 111
6.8	10.9	US 319 (SR 35 / Veterans Parkway / Tifton Highway) / SR 33 north / SR 133 (East Bypass) to I-75 – Sylvester, Sylvester, Albany, Quitman, Thomasville, Tifton, Sunbelt Expo Spence Field	Northern end of SR 33 concurrency; northern terminus; roadway continues as US 319 north/SR 35 north (Tifton Highway); US 319 south/SR 35 south/SR 133 south provides access to Colquitt Regional Medical Center.
1.000 mi = 1.609 km; 1.000 km = 0.621 mi: Concurrency terminus

== Gallery ==
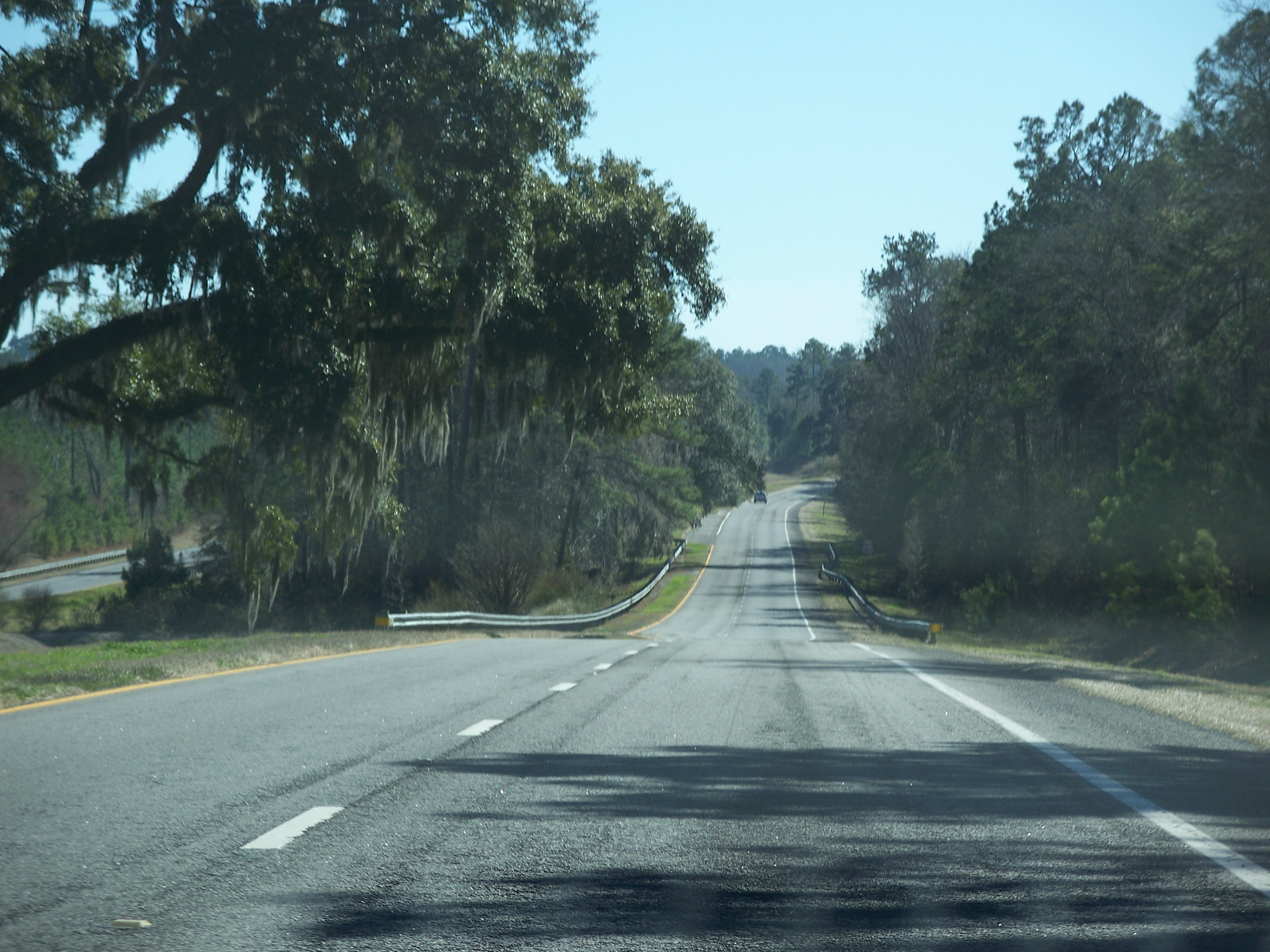
US 319/SR 61 concurrency near the Georgia state line

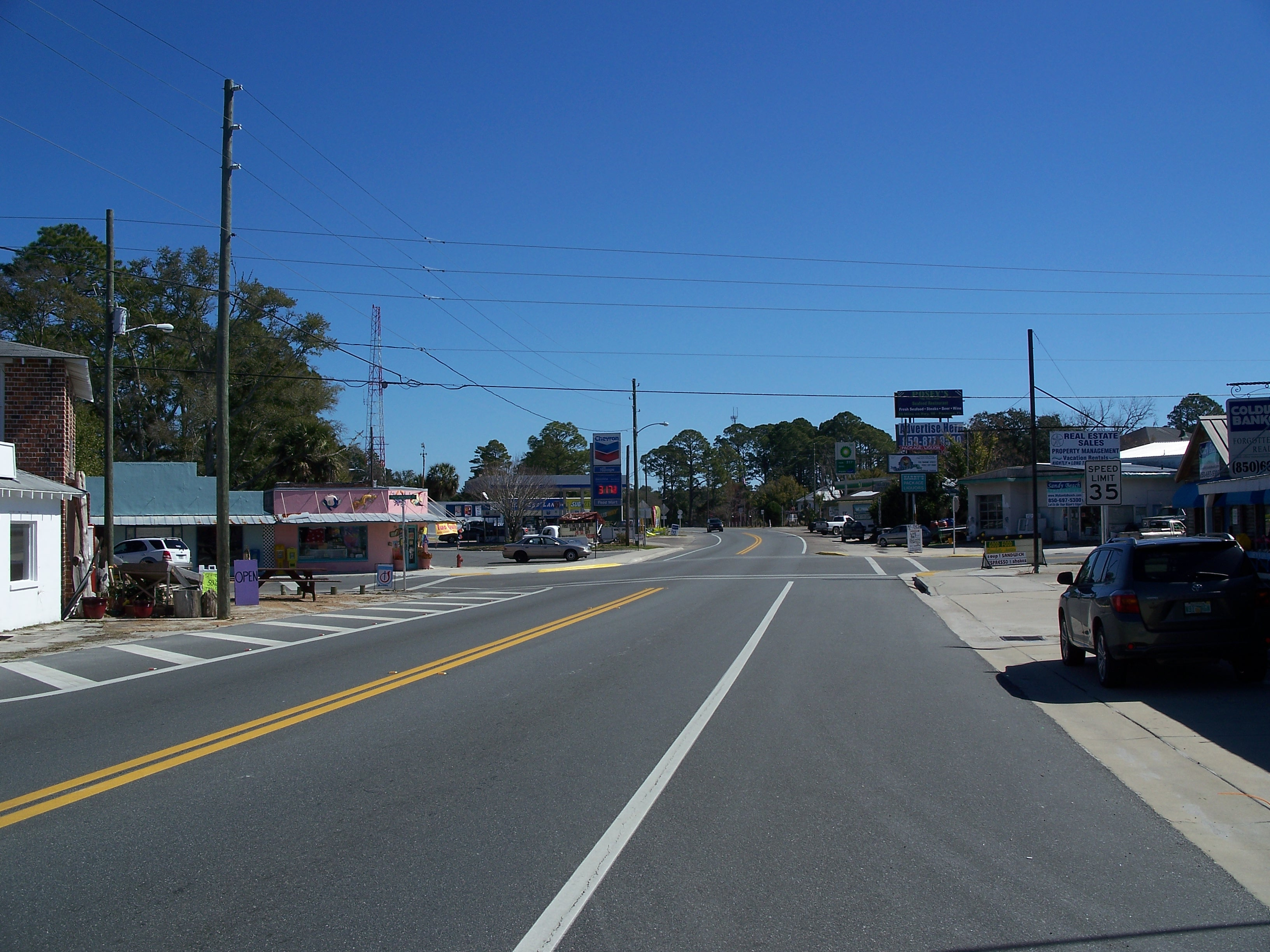
US 98/US 319 concurrency in Carrabelle

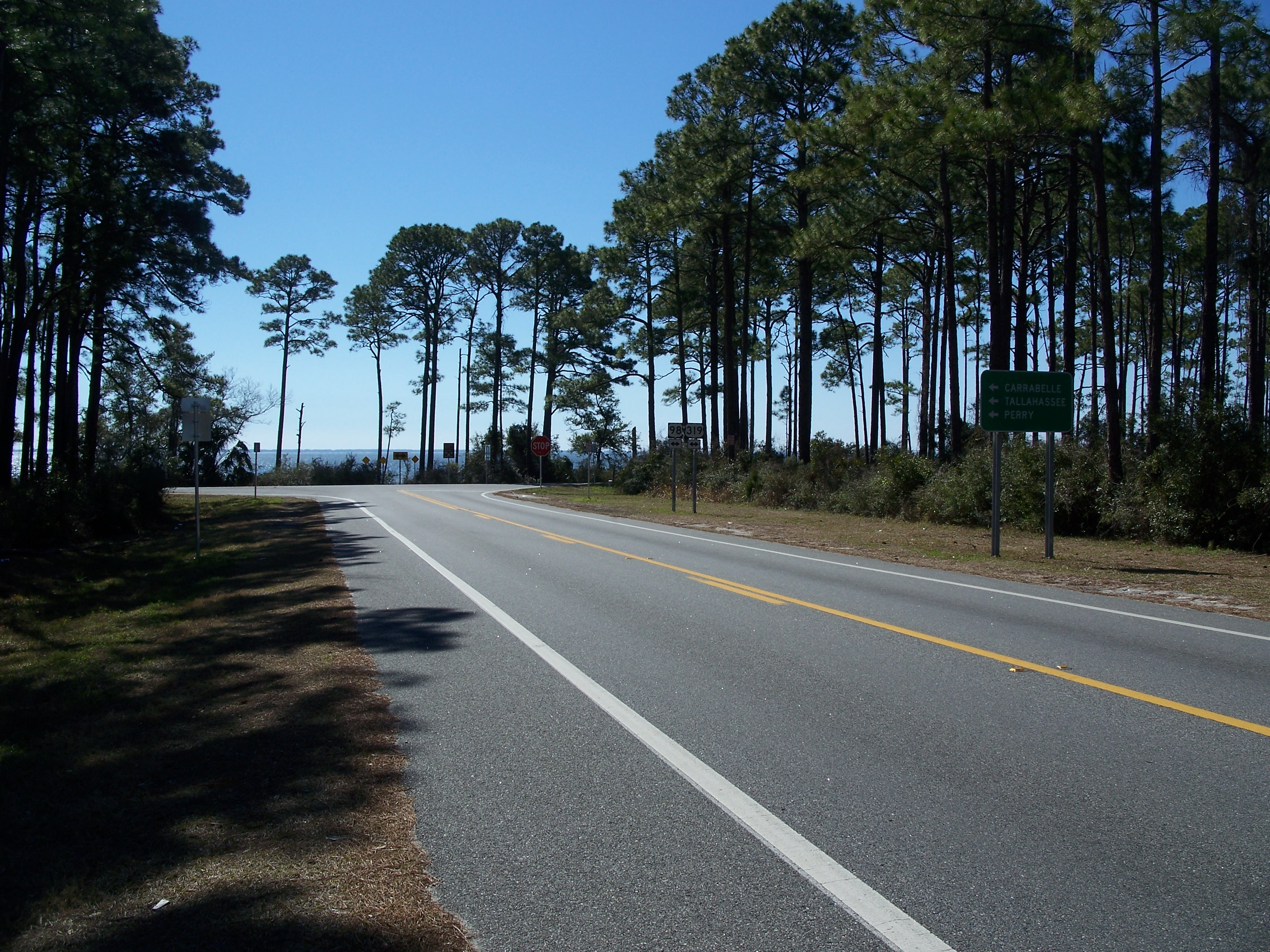
Intersection of SR 65 with US 98/319

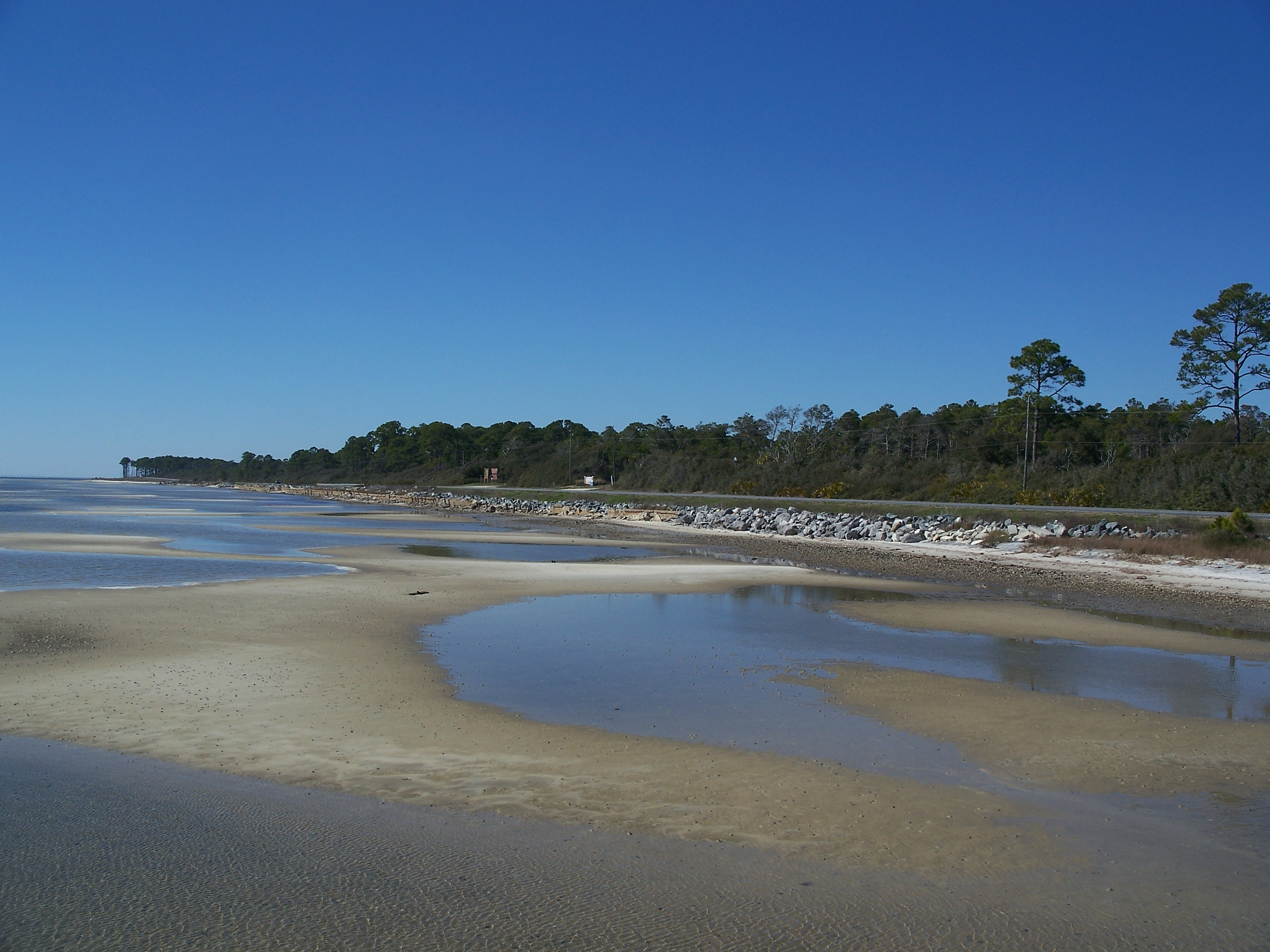
US 98/319 concurrency in Franklin County, Florida
