= Florida State Road 263 =

State highway in Florida, United States

State Road 263
- Capital Circle
- SR 263 highlighted in red

Route information
- Maintained by FDOT
- Length: 15.044 mi (24.211 km)

Major junctions
- South end: US 319 / SR 363 in Tallahassee
- US 90 in Tallahassee; I-10 in Tallahassee
- North end: US 27 in Lake Jackson

Location
- Country: United States
- State: Florida
- Counties: Leon

Highway system
- Florida State Highway System; Interstate; US; State; Former; Pre‑1945; Toll; Scenic
← SR 262	→ SR 265

State Road 263 (SR 263) is a north–south route that forms the western portion of Capital Circle, Tallahassee's "beltway".

The route runs from State Road 363 (Woodville Highway), taking over from the hidden State Road 261 to its east. it then runs west, separating from US 319 at State Road 61/Crawfordville Highway, where SR 263 is signed from here to the northern terminus. It runs west, where after an intersection with County Road 2203, it passes by the northern end of Tallahassee Regional Airport, where the road then turns north, leaving airport grounds at the intersection of SR 371. It continues north, towards US 90 and I-10 before ending at US 27 in Tallahassee. It starts at SR 61, continues west, turns north, ending at SR 63 and US 27 In Tallahassee.

== Major intersections ==
The entire route is in Leon County.

Location	mi	km	Destinations	Notes
Tallahassee	0.000	0.000	SR 363 (Woodville Highway) / US 319 north (Capital Circle / SR 261)	south end of US 319 overlap
Tallahassee	1.330	2.140	US 319 south (Crawfordville Highway / SR 61 south) / SR 61 north – Tallahassee, Crawfordville	north end of US 319 overlap
Tallahassee	3.524	5.671	CR 2203 (Springhill Road) – Florida State University, Florida A&M University, Downtown Tallahassee	
	4.557	7.334	CR 2205 north (Lake Bradford Road)	
Tallahassee	6.895	11.096	SR 371 north (Orange Avenue) – FAMU/FSU College of Engineering, National Magnet Lab, Tallahassee Museum of History and Natural Science	
Tallahassee	8.037	12.934	SR 20 (Blountstown Highway) – Hosford, Tallahassee	
Tallahassee	9.797	15.767	US 90 (Tennessee Street / SR 10) – Tallahassee, Quincy, Mission San Luis	
Tallahassee	10.102	16.258	CR 158 east (Tharpe Street)	
Tallahassee	11.26	18.12	I-10 (SR 8) – Pensacola, Lake City	I-10 exit 196
	12.173	19.591	CR 0356 east (Fred George Road)	
Lake Jackson	14.543	23.405	CR 0361 south (Old Bainbridge Road)	south end of CR 0361 overlap
Lake Jackson	15.044	24.211	US 27 (SR 63) / CR 0361 north (Old Bainbridge Road) – Havana, Tallahassee	north end of CR 0361 overlap
1.000 mi = 1.609 km; 1.000 km = 0.621 mi: Concurrency terminus

== Related route ==
State Road 263A
- Location: Tallahassee

Former State Road 263A, now County Road 0356, also known as Fred George Road, is an east–west route in northwestern Tallahassee, Florida, United States, connecting US 27 (Monroe Street) with State Road 263 (Capital Circle).

The Fred George Basin Greenway is located adjacent to the road, between Capital Circle and the CSX railroad.
