= Riversprings middle school =

Location
- Crawfordville, Wakulla County, Florida; United States
- 30.2182°N 84.3179°W

Information
- Type: Public school
- Principal: Joshua Sandgren
- Grades: 6-8
- Enrollment: 530
- Website: rms.wakullaschooldistrict.org

Riversprings Middle School (RMS) is a public middle school, teaching 6th to 8th grade, in Crawfordville, Wakulla County, Florida.

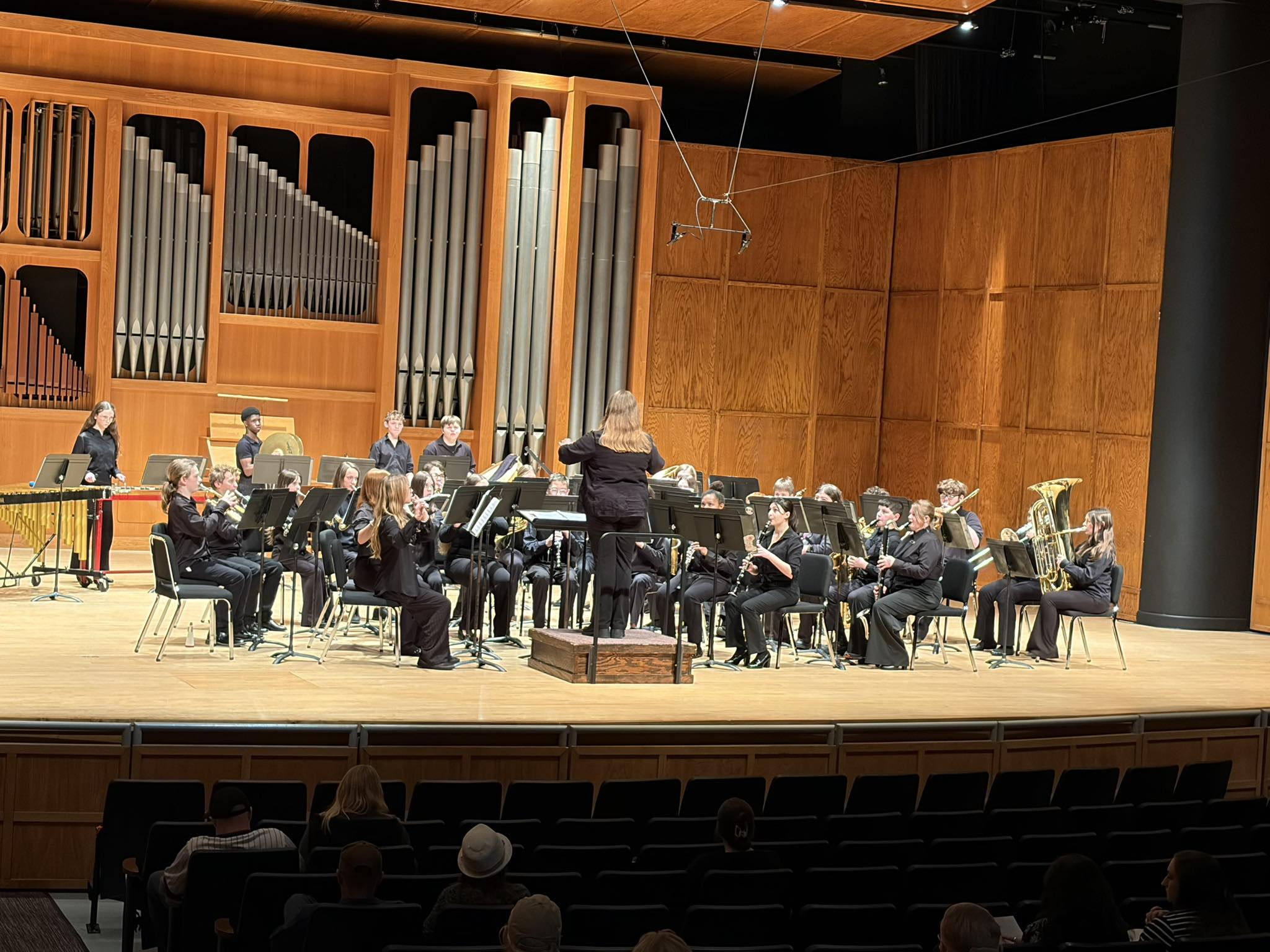

== Sports ==
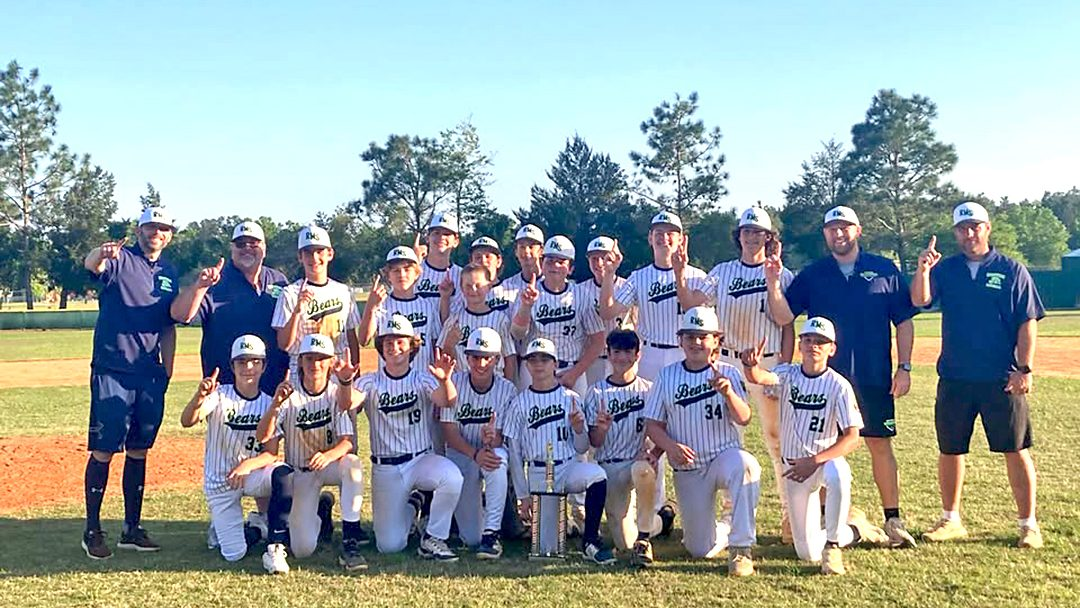
Riversprings baseball team winning 1st place in a tournament.

Riversprings Middle School competes in sports as the Riversprings Bears. The school offers baseball, basketball, cheerleading, cross-country, football, soccer, softball, track and field, volleyball, and wrestling.

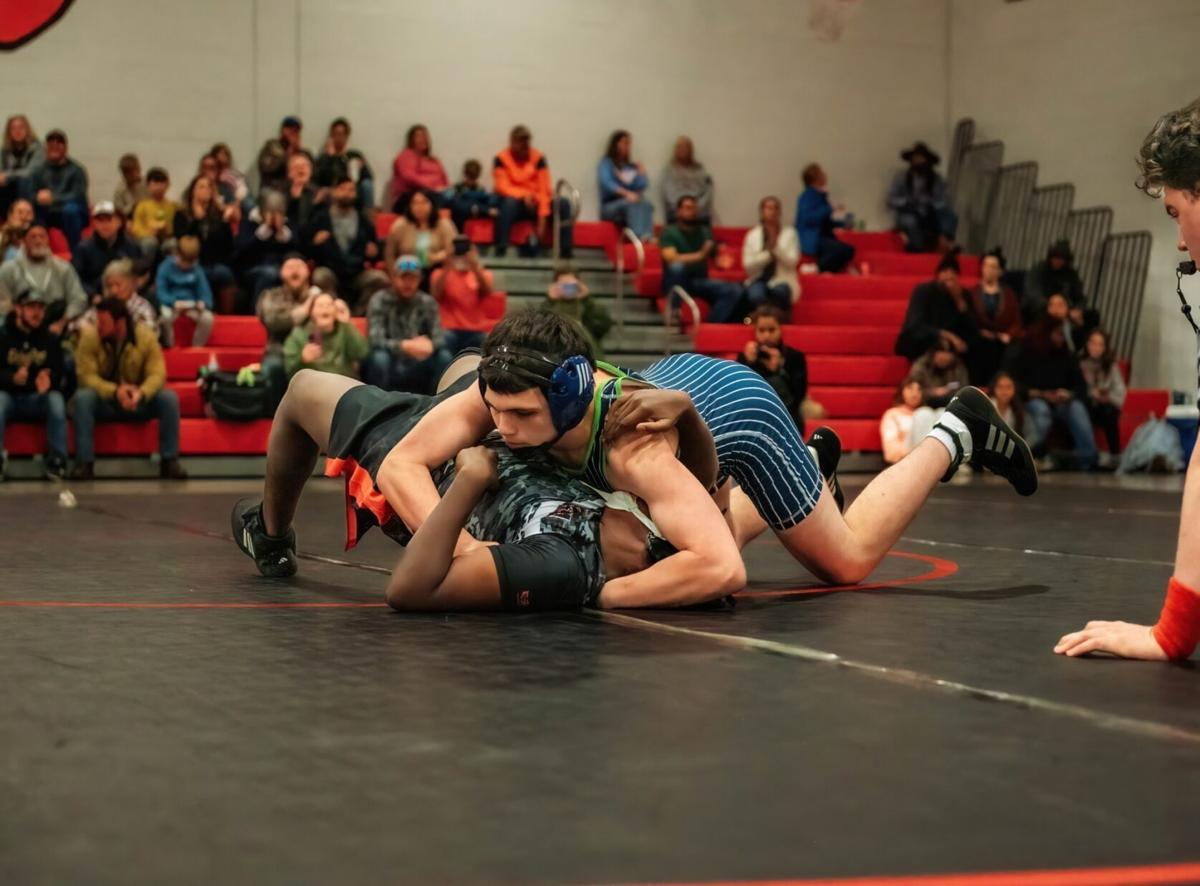
A wrestler from Riversprings pinning a kid from the Wakulla team in their rivalry matches

== Clubs ==
Clubs at RMS include Odyssey of the Mind, Academic Team, and Art Club.

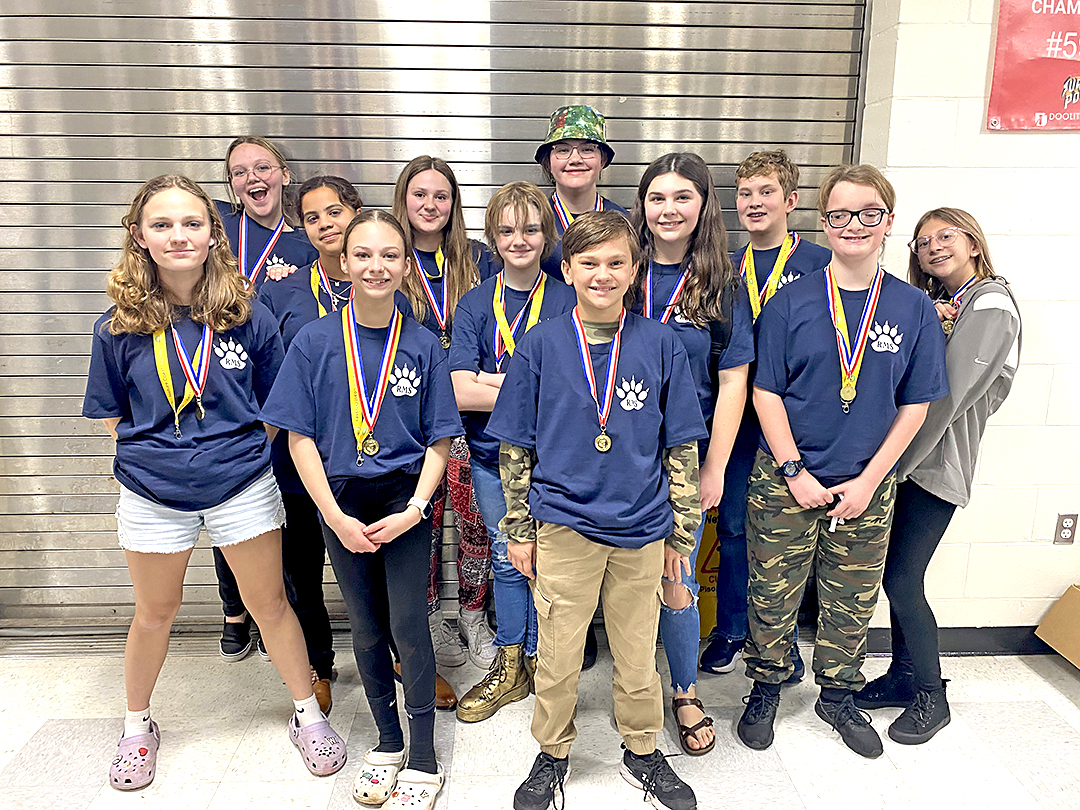
The Riversprings Middle School Odyssey of the Mind team participated in the Regional Competition at Bucklake Elementary School

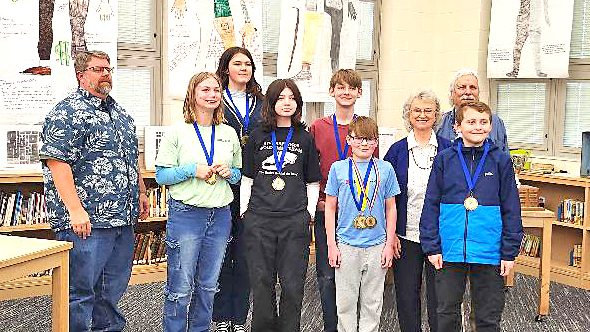
The Riversprings Academic team winning 1st place in their rivalry against Wakulla Middle
