= Mashes Sands =

Beach in Wakulla County, Florida

Coordinates: 29°58′N 84°20′W

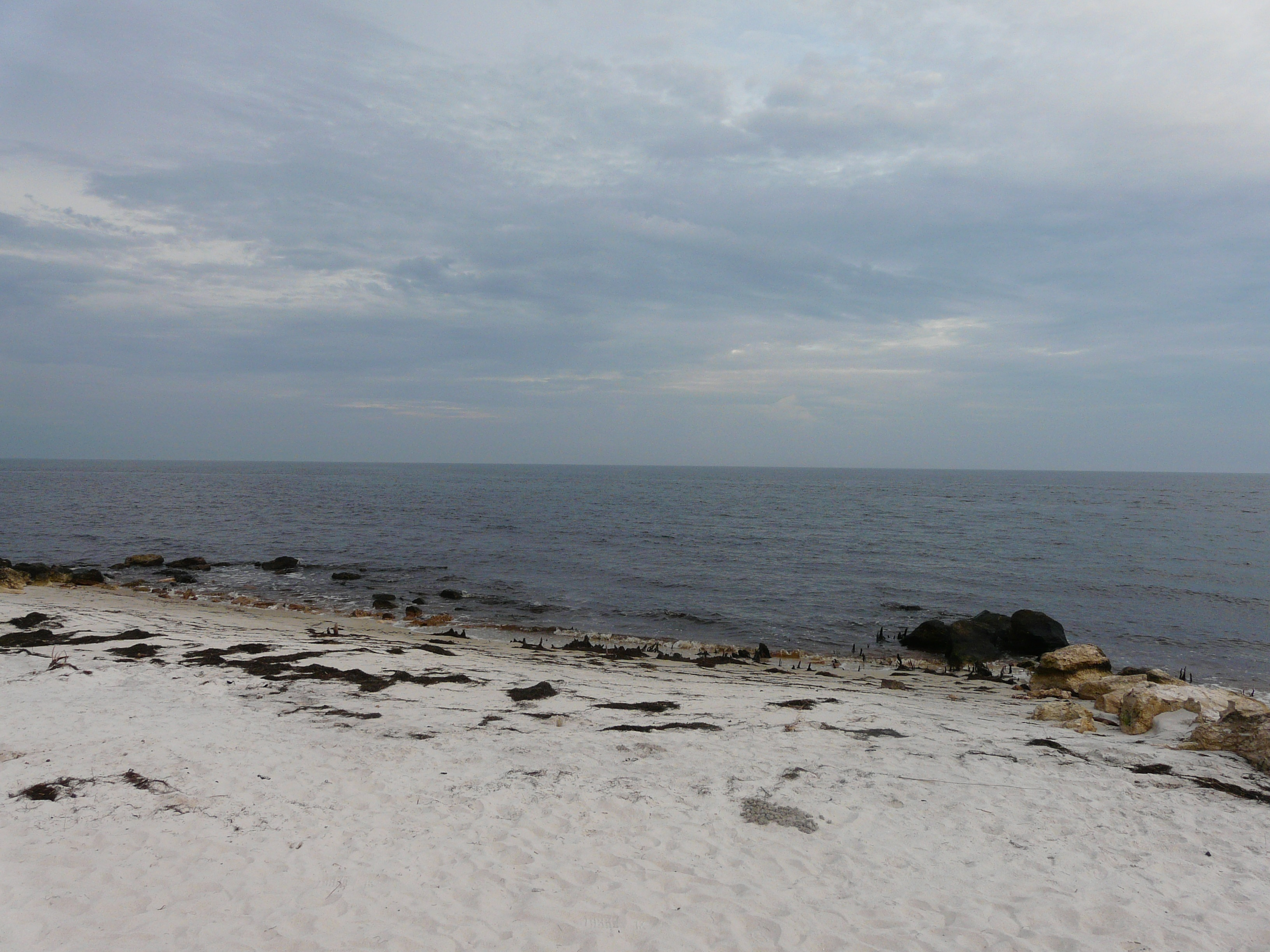
The beach at Mashes Sands County Park

Mashes Sands is a beach front in Wakulla County, Florida, United States.

Mashes Sands is located 6 miles south-southeast of Panacea at the terminus of Mashes Sands Road (County Road 372). The beach overlooks the Gulf of Mexico from a small peninsula bordered by Ochlockonee Bay on the west and the greater Apalachee Bay to the east.

Mashes Sands saw action during the Civil War. On 15 July 1863, the screw steamer gunboat USS Stars and Stripes and wooden side-wheel steam ferryboat USS Somerset attacked the salt works here.

"The Sands" is serviced and accessed by Wakulla County Airport, located approximately 3 miles south of Panacea. It is the only airport in Wakulla County.

In June 2007, Mashes Sands was used as a filming location of the student film Apotheosis.
