= Hilliardville, Florida =

- Unincorporated community
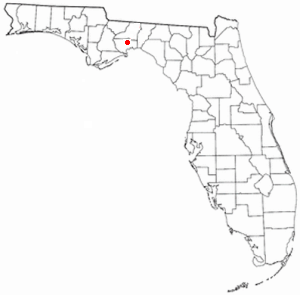
- Location of Hilliardville, Florida
- Coordinates: 30°17′16″N 84°23′58″W
- Country: United States
- State: Florida
- County: Wakulla
- Elevation: 59 ft (18 m)
- Time zone: UTC-5 (Eastern (EST))
  - Summer (DST): UTC-4 (EDT)
- Area code: 850
- GNIS feature ID: 305812

Hilliardville is an unincorporated community in northern Wakulla County, Florida, United States.

== Location ==
Hilliardville is located at the junction of Bloxham Cutoff Road and Springhill Road. The elevation at Hilliardville is 62 feet (18.8m).

== History ==
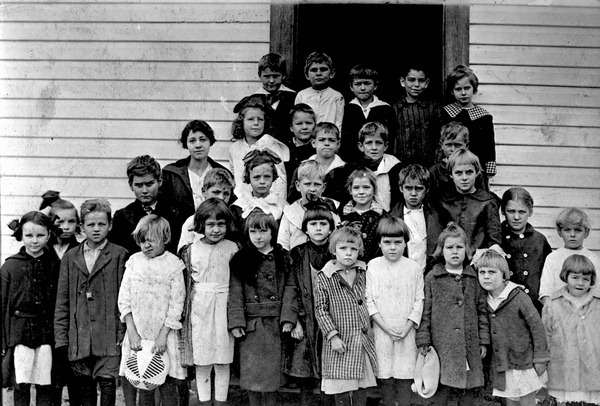
Old Hilliardville Elementary School

Hilliardville has been a community since the late 1800s and was a stop on the Carrabelle, Tallahassee and Georgia Railroad. The train arrived at Hilliardville at 1:55 in the afternoon from Tallahassee, picked up passengers and goods, and departed arriving in Lanark at 3:00 in the afternoon.
