= Florida State Road 373 =

State highway in Florida, United States

State Road 373
- SR 373 in red, CR 373 in blue

Route information
- Maintained by FDOT
- Length: 1.708 mi (2.749 km)

Major junctions
- West end: SR 371 in Tallahassee
- East end: SR 61 / CR 373 in Tallahassee

Location
- Country: United States
- State: Florida
- Counties: Leon

Highway system
- Florida State Highway System; Interstate; US; State; Former; Pre‑1945; Toll; Scenic
← SR 371	→ I-375

State Road 373 (SR 373) or C.K. Steele Memorial Highway is a 1.708-mile-long (2.749 km) east–west state highway in Tallahassee, in the northern part of the U.S. state or Florida. It travels along Orange Avenue between SR 371 and SR 61. In 2018, the Florida Legislature designated the roadway as C.K. Steele Memorial Highway in honor of late civil rights leader Charles Kenzie Steele.

The highway continues eastward along Orange Avenue as County Road 373 (CR 373) until it reaches Blair Stone Road, onto which it turns and travels until reaching U.S. Route 27 (US 27; Apalachee Parkway).

A spur route, SR 373A, formerly traveled south along Springhill Road (CR 2203) to SR 267 in Wakulla County.

== Major intersections ==
The entire route is in Tallahassee, Leon County.

mi	km	Destinations	Notes
0.000	0.000	SR 371 (Lake Bradford Road / Orange Avenue West)	
0.347	0.558	CR 2203 (Springhill Road)	
1.565	2.519	SR 363 (South Adams Street)	
1.708	2.749	SR 61 (South Monroe Street) / CR 373 east (East Orange Avenue)	
1.000 mi = 1.609 km; 1.000 km = 0.621 mi
