= Florida State Road 157 =

State highway in Florida, United States

State Road 157
- SR 157 highlighted in red

Route information
- Maintained by FDOT
- Length: 0.3 mi (480 m)

Major junctions
- South end: SR 371 in Tallahassee
- SR 366 in Tallahassee
- North end: Jefferson Street in Tallahassee

Location
- Country: United States
- State: Florida
- Counties: Leon

Highway system
- Florida State Highway System; Interstate; US; State; Former; Pre‑1945; Toll; Scenic
| ← SR 155 | → SR 159 |

State Road 157 (SR 157) is a north–south unsigned state highway in Tallahassee, Florida. It follows Woodward Avenue just south of the Florida State University campus, between Gaines Street (SR 371) and Jefferson Street.

== Route description ==
SR 157 is a short two-lane road and maintains a 25 miles per hour (40 km/h) speed limit. North of its terminus at Jefferson Street, Woodward Avenue continues north for two more blocks before becoming a pedestrian pathway through the FSU campus. North of campus, Woodward Avenue resumes its course without a state designation.

== Major intersections ==
The entire route is in Tallahassee, Leon County.

| mi | km | Destinations | Notes |
|---|---|---|---|
| 0.00 | 0.00 | SR 371 (Gaines Street) | Traffic circle, former traffic signal at intersection |
| 0.10 | 0.16 | SR 366 east (Saint Augustine Street) | One-way eastbound |
| 0.20 | 0.32 | SR 366 west (Pensacola Street) | One-way westbound |
| 0.30 | 0.48 | Jefferson Street / Woodland Avenue north | End of state maintenance |
1.000 mi = 1.609 km; 1.000 km = 0.621 mi
