= Florida State Road 366 =

State highway in Florida, United States

State Road 366
- SR 366 in red, Former SR 366 in blue

Route information
- Maintained by FDOT
- Length: 4.5 mi (7.2 km)

Major junctions
- West end: SR 20 west of Tallahassee
- East end: US 27 / SR 61 in Tallahassee

Location
- Country: United States
- State: Florida
- Counties: Leon

Highway system
- Florida State Highway System; Interstate; US; State; Former; Pre‑1945; Toll; Scenic
← SR 363	→ SR 368

State Road 366 (SR 366) is a short east–west route in Tallahassee between U.S. Route 27 (US 27) and SR 20. It is primarily known as Pensacola Street throughout its path, due to its generally westward course toward the Florida city of Pensacola, although an eastbound section is known as St. Augustine Road, heading toward St. Augustine.

== Route description ==
Turning onto westbound West Jefferson Street from S Monroe St/US 27, the route cuts southwest around the Florida State Capitol. Route 366 then transfers to W Pensacola St, heading one-way westbound. It passes by the Donald L. Tucker Center and the southern edge of Florida State University's main campus. This segment is dominated by fraternity and sorority houses, campus ministries, and several other houses and apartments. Along the same stretch, W St. Augustine Rd serves as the one-way eastbound carrier of Route 366, two blocks to the south of Pensacola St. The land use is nearly identical to that of Pensacola St, and after being routed slightly to the southeast onto W Madison St, 366 passes the south side of the Tucker Center and the main offices of the Seminoles' basketball program. After passing several blocks of parking lots and government buildings, SR 366 ends at SR 61/S Monroe St.

To the west, Pensacola Street's path is cut off by Florida State's Doak Campbell Stadium, so SR 366 bypasses the stadium to the south via Stadium Dr, crossing W Gaines St/Lake Bradford Rd/SR 371 before turning to the north and again becoming Pensacola Street after a left hand turn on the west side of the stadium.

Restaurants and other businesses dominate this stretch of Pensacola Street, as well as apartment complexes and other housing. Further to the west, there are several municipal services, including the Leon County School Board and a fire department training center, as well as a homeless shelter. SR 366 forms the southern boundary of Tallahassee Community College's main campus. It then passes over the Florida Gulf & Atlantic railroad line on an overpass before meeting its western terminus at SR 20 In Tallahassee.

== Major intersections ==
The entire route is in Leon County.

Location	mi	km	Destinations	Notes
	0.000	0.000	SR 20 (Blountstown Highway) / Nina Road – Naval and Marine Corps Reserve Center	
Tallahassee	2.638	4.245	To US 90 / Stadium Drive	
Tallahassee	3.161	5.087	SR 371 (Gaines Street / Lake Bradford Road)	east end of state maintenance; eastbound exit and westbound entrance
Tallahassee	3.5	5.6	SR 157 (Woodward Avenue)	
Tallahassee	4.3	6.9	South Bronough Street	to SR 363 south
Tallahassee	4.5	7.2	US 27 / SR 61 (Monroe Street / SR 20)	
1.000 mi = 1.609 km; 1.000 km = 0.621 mi
