= Florida State Road 267 =

State highway in Florida, United States

State Road 267
- SR 267 in red, CR 267A in blue

Route information
- Maintained by FDOT
- Length: 59.478 mi (95.721 km)

Major junctions
- South end: US 98 in Newport
- SR 20 in Bloxham; I-10 near Quincy; US 90 in Quincy
- North end: SR 302 towards Bainbridge, GA

Location
- Country: United States
- State: Florida
- Counties: Wakulla, Leon, Liberty, Gadsden

Highway system
- Florida State Highway System; Interstate; US; State; Former; Pre‑1945; Toll; Scenic
| ← SR 265 | → SR 273 |

State Road 267 (SR 267) is a road in the U.S. state of Florida. It has a north–south state route in the eastern Florida panhandle, west of Tallahassee.

The route begins at U.S. Route 98 (US 98) in Newport and heads northwest as it crosses SR 363, passes Wakulla Springs, crosses US 319, and continues through the Apalachicola National Forest. It briefly joins with SR 20 to cross the Ochlockonee River, then splits to continue northward to Interstate 10 (I-10), US 90 in Quincy, and the Georgia state line, where it continues as State Route 302.

== Major intersections ==
| County | Location | mi | km | Destinations | Notes |
|---|---|---|---|---|---|
| Wakulla | Newport | 0.000 | 0.000 | US 98 (SR 30) | |
| Wakulla | Wakulla | 3.765 | 6.059 | SR 363 – St. Marks, Woodville, Natural Bridge Battlefield Historic State Park, Wakulla Correctional Institution | |
| Wakulla | Wakulla | 3.880 | 6.244 | CR 365 south – Crawfordville | |
| Wakulla | | 8.820 | 14.194 | CR 61 – Tallahassee | |
| Wakulla | | 12.204 | 19.640 | US 319 (SR 369) – Crawfordville, Tallahassee | |
| Wakulla | Hilliardville | 14.865 | 23.923 | CR 373 north | |
| Leon | | 16.690 | 26.860 | Helen Guard Station Road | former SR 267A east |
| Leon | Bloxham | 30.790 | 49.552 | SR 20 east – Tallahassee | south end of SR 20 overlap |
| Leon | | 31.193 | 50.200 | CR 375 south (Smith Creek Road) – Ochlockonee River State Park | |
| Ochlockonee River | | 32.38 | 52.11 | Bridge | |
| Liberty | | 32.680 | 52.593 | CR 0120 east | |
| Liberty | | 34.334 | 55.255 | SR 20 west – Hosford | north end of SR 20 overlap |
| Gadsden | | 41.602 | 66.952 | CR 65C south (McCall Bridge Road) – Wallwood Scout Reservation | |
| Gadsden | Wetumpka | 42.342 | 68.143 | CR 65B (Old Federal Road) | |
| Gadsden | | 46.425 | 74.714 | CR 267A south (Spooner Road) | |
| Gadsden | | 46.69 | 75.14 | I-10 (SR 8) – Pensacola, Tallahassee | Exit 181 (I-10) |
| Gadsden | Quincy | 49.446 | 79.576 | CR 274 (Martin Luther King Jr. Boulevard) – Gadsden Technical Institute | |
| Gadsden | Quincy | 50.147 | 80.704 | US 90 west (Jefferson Street / SR 10) / Pat Thomas Parkway (CR 268 west) – Chattahoochee | south end of US 90 / SR 10 overlap |
| Gadsden | Quincy | 50.990 | 82.060 | US 90 east (Jefferson Street / SR 10) / CR 268 east (Adams Street) – Gadsden Technical Institute | north end of US 90 / SR 10 overlap |
| Gadsden | | 52.423 | 84.367 | CR 270A east (Salter Road) | |
| Gadsden | | 55.246 | 88.910 | CR 272 east (Old Philadelphia Church Road) | |
| Gadsden | | 55.625 | 89.520 | CR 483 west (Shade Farm Road) | |
| Gadsden | | 56.463 | 90.868 | CR 272 west (Hutchinson Ferry Road) | |
| Gadsden | | 59.478 | 95.721 | SR 302 north | Georgia state line |
1.000 mi = 1.609 km; 1.000 km = 0.621 mi

== County Road 267A ==
County Road 267A
- Location: Gadsden County

County Road 267A is the only suffixed alternate of SR 267. The road is named Spooner Road and can be found south of Quincy. It begins south of the interchange with I-10 and runs southeast to County Road 65B (Old Federal Highway).
