= Ochlockonee Bay, Florida =

Unincorporated community in Florida, U.S.

- Unincorporated community
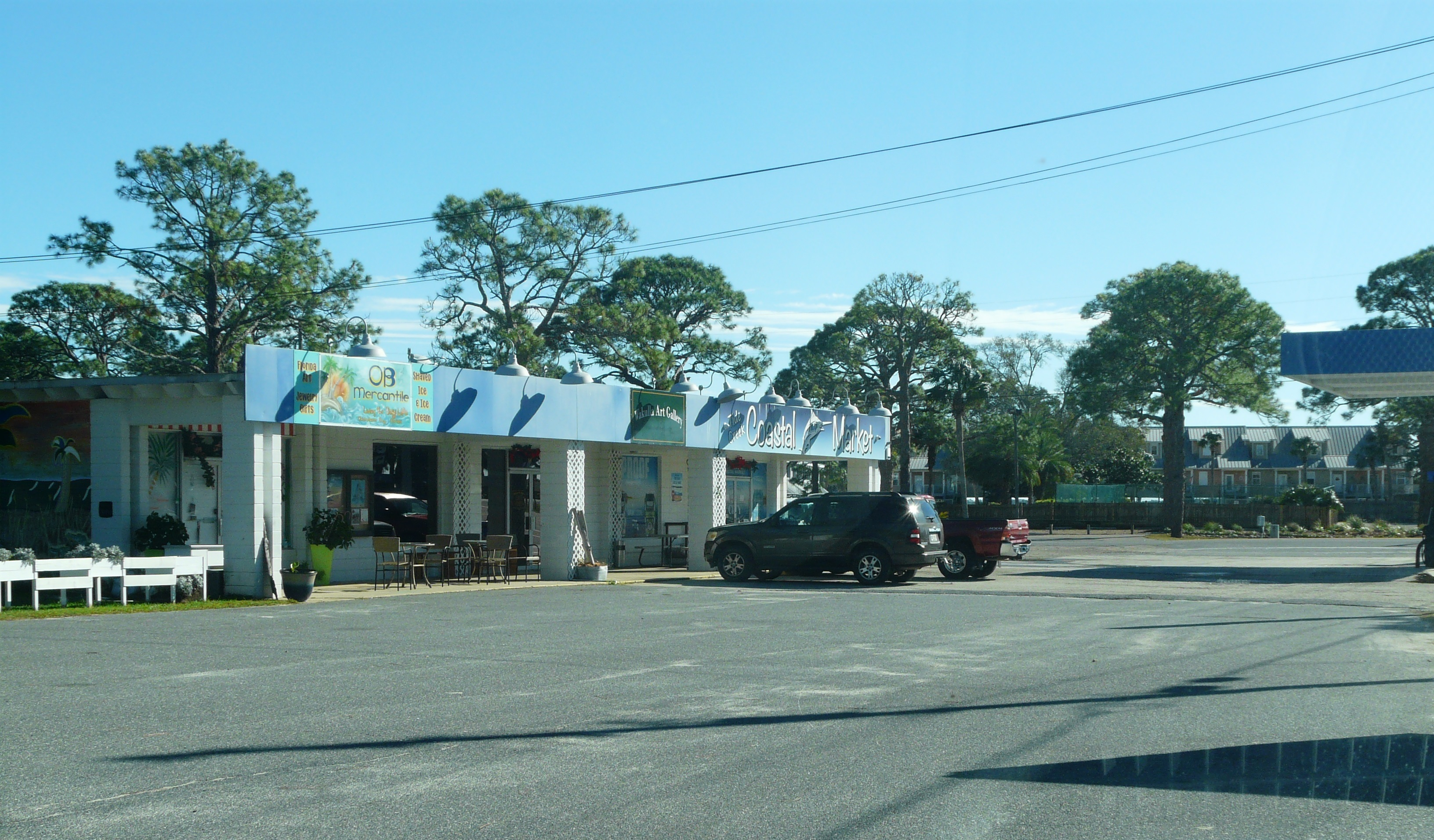

- Location within Florida
- Coordinates: 29.979°N 84.383°W
- Country: United States
- State: Florida
- County: Wakulla
- Time zone: UTC-5 (Eastern (EST))
  - Summer (DST): UTC-4 (EDT)
- Area code: 850

Ochlockonee Bay is an unincorporated community in Wakulla County, Florida, United States, located at the intersection of U.S. Highway 98 and County Road 372, south of Panacea. Situated on the north shore of Ochlockonee Bay, it is also recognized by the U.S. Postal Service as Ochlockonee.
