= Bethel, Florida =

- Unincorporated community
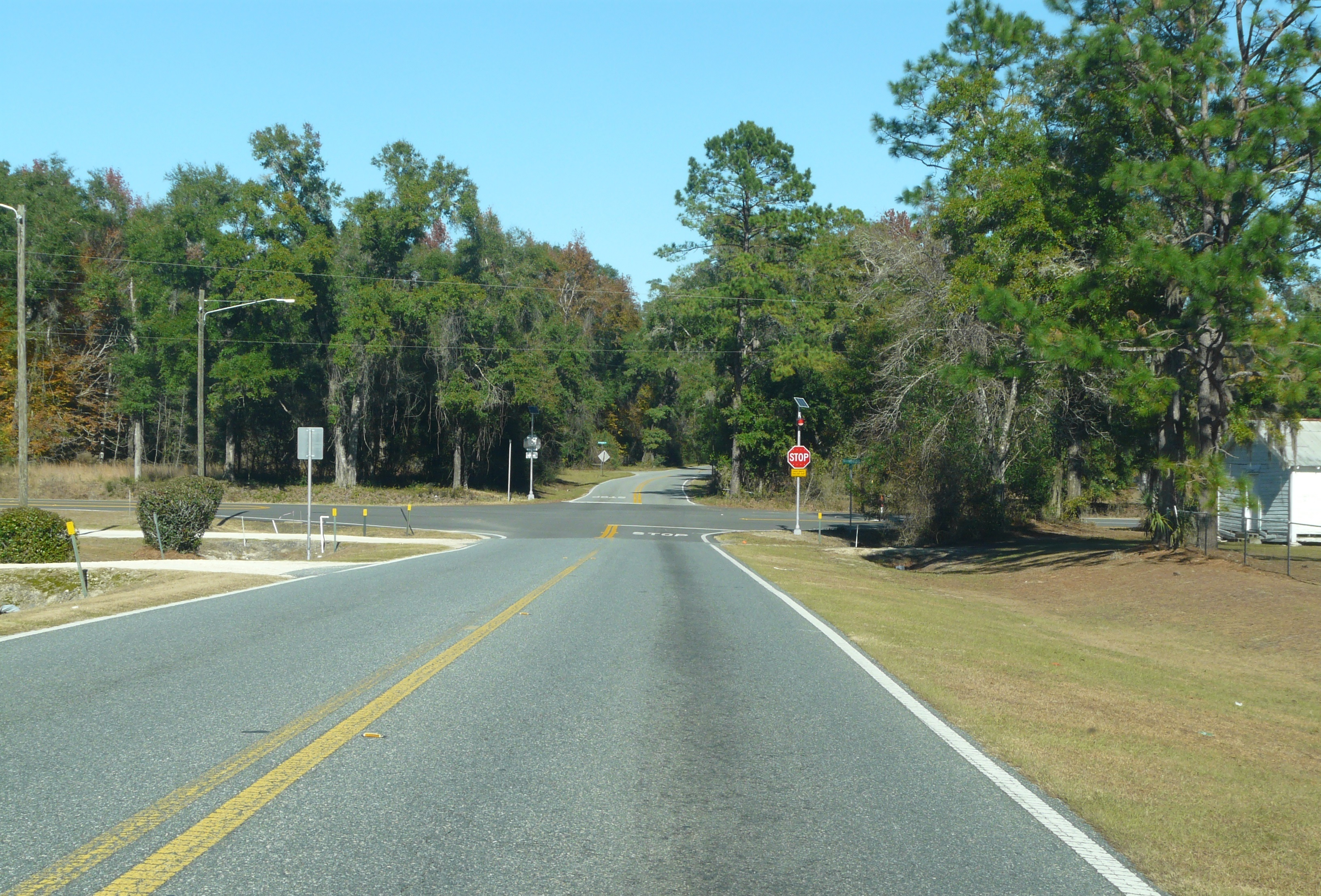
- Intersection of CR-365 and FL-267 in Bethel

- Location within Florida
- Coordinates: 30°15′08″N 84°19′27″W
- Country: United States
- State: Florida
- County: Wakulla
- Elevation: 20 ft (6.1 m)
- Time zone: UTC-5 (Eastern (EST))
  - Summer (DST): UTC-4 (EDT)
- Area code: 850
- GNIS feature ID: 305277

Bethel is an unincorporated community in Wakulla County, Florida, United States.
