= Florida State Road 160 =

State highway in Florida, United States

State Road 160
- Florida State Road 160 highlighted in red

Route information
- Maintained by FDOT
- Length: 0.114 mi (183 m)

Major junctions
- West end: SR 61 / CR 0352 in Tallahassee
- East end: US 319 north / Killearn Center Boulevard in Tallahassee

Location
- Country: United States
- State: Florida
- Counties: Leon

Highway system
- Florida State Highway System; Interstate; US; State; Former; Pre‑1945; Toll; Scenic
← SR 159	→ SR 162

State Road 160 (FL 160) is a 0.114-mile-long (0.183 km) state highway in Tallahassee, Leon County, Florida, that connects Florida State Road 61 and County Road 0352 and U.S. Route 319 north of Interstate 10 in northern Tallahassee.

== Major intersections ==
The entire route is in Tallahassee, Leon County.

mi	km	Destinations	Notes
0.000	0.000	SR 61 (Thomasville Road) / CR 0352 west (Timberlane Road)	Western terminus of SR 160; eastern terminus of CR 0352
0.114	0.183	US 319 (SR 261) / Killearn Center Boulevard east	Eastern terminus of SR 160; western terminus of Killearn Center Road
1.000 mi = 1.609 km; 1.000 km = 0.621 mi
