= Wakulla Volcano =

Smoke of unknown provenance observed in northwest Florida until the late 19th century

The Wakulla Volcano was the name given to a prominent column of smoke, sometimes accompanied by bright light, seen coming from deep in the swamps of Wakulla County, Florida, from at least the Spanish occupation of Florida through 1886. The scientific assumption today is that the smoke came from a peat fire.

The first accounts of the smoke come from Seminoles living nearby, and by the 1830s, white settlers attributed the sight to campfires from white or Indian settlements, pirates, renegades, or a volcano. Over the years a number of folkloric explanations were given, along with plausibly naturalistic ones such as deep-burning peat fires. Several teams of investigators set out to solve the mystery during the late 19th century; the Smithsonian Institution holds correspondence from A. W. Barber between 1890 and 1894 concerning his experience there. Sightings occurred as far away as 20 miles, and were reported throughout much of the 19th century, but the phenomenon may have been visible much earlier; it has even been suggested that Wakulla, which may mean "mist" or "misting", received its name from the strange smoke. A number of explanations have been given, most famously that an active volcano stood out in the swamplands, but no one was able to locate the smoke's source before it disappeared forever on August 31, 1886, the day of the Charleston earthquake. Although a number of people have claimed to have found the crater of origin, modern geologists are quite certain no volcano could exist in Florida.
