= Florida State Road 162 =

Highway in Florida

State Road 162
- Raymond Diehl Road
- Florida State Road 162 highlighted in red

Route information
- Maintained by FDOT
- Length: 0.292 mi (470 m)

Major junctions
- West end: SR 61 in Tallahassee
- I-10 east in Tallahassee
- East end: US 319 / Raymond Diehl Road in Tallahassee

Location
- Country: United States
- State: Florida
- Counties: Leon

Highway system
- Florida State Highway System; Interstate; US; State; Former; Pre‑1945; Toll; Scenic
← SR 160	→ SR 166

State Road 162 (FL 162) is an unsigned 0.292-mile-long (0.470 km) state highway in Tallahassee, Leon County, Florida, that connects Florida State Road 61 and U.S. Route 319 south of Interstate 10 in northern Tallahassee.

== Major intersections ==
The entire route is in Tallahassee, Leon County.

mi	km	Destinations	Notes
0.000	0.000	SR 61 (Thomasville Road)	Western terminus; continues as CR 0352 beyond SR 61
0.120	0.193	I-10 east – Lake City	Access only from SR 162 to eastbound I-10
0.292	0.470	US 319 (Capital Circle Northeast / SR 261) / Raymond Diehl Road	Eastern terminus; continues as Raymond Diehl Road beyond US 319
1.000 mi = 1.609 km; 1.000 km = 0.621 mi: Incomplete access
