= Fred George Basin Greenway =

Park in Tallahassee, Florida

- Interactive map of Fred George Basin Greenway
- Type: Greenway park
- Location: Tallahassee, Florida
- Coordinates: 30.493°N 84.356°W
- Area: 175 acres (0.71 km^{2})
- Operator: Leon County Parks & Recreation
- Status: Under development

The Fred George Basin Greenway is a Greenway park project in northwestern Tallahassee, Florida, covering 175 acres (71 ha), including Fred George Sink that runs alongside Fred George Road near Capital Circle.

Under development as a public park, it is planned to have hiking trails and other low-impact recreation opportunities.

On 28 December 2015, the Tallahassee Democrat reported that the park would open on 17 February 2016.
