= Wakulla County Airport =

Airport in Florida, U.S.

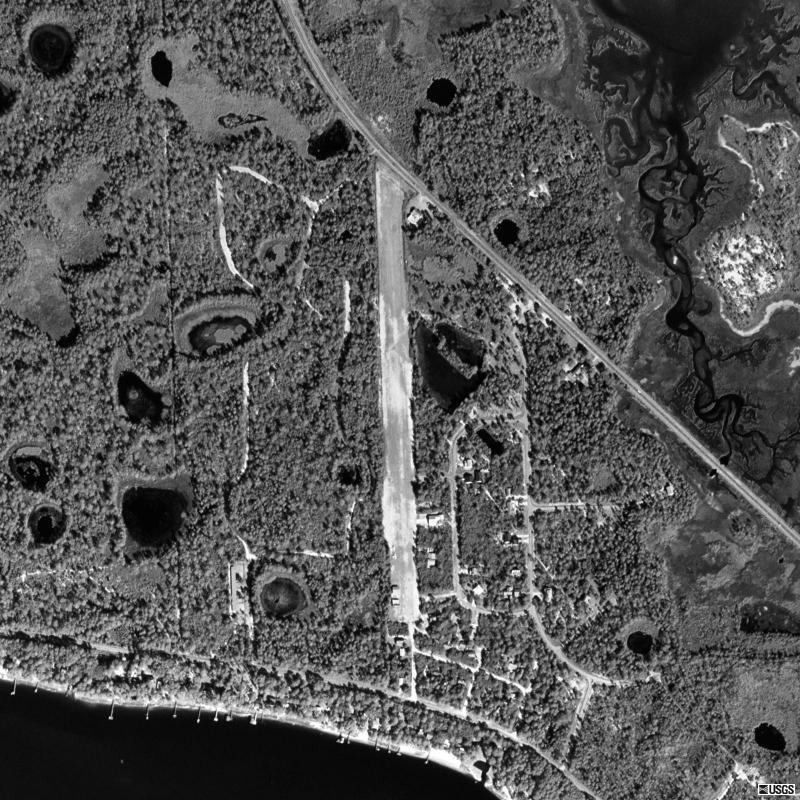
- USGS 1999 orthophoto

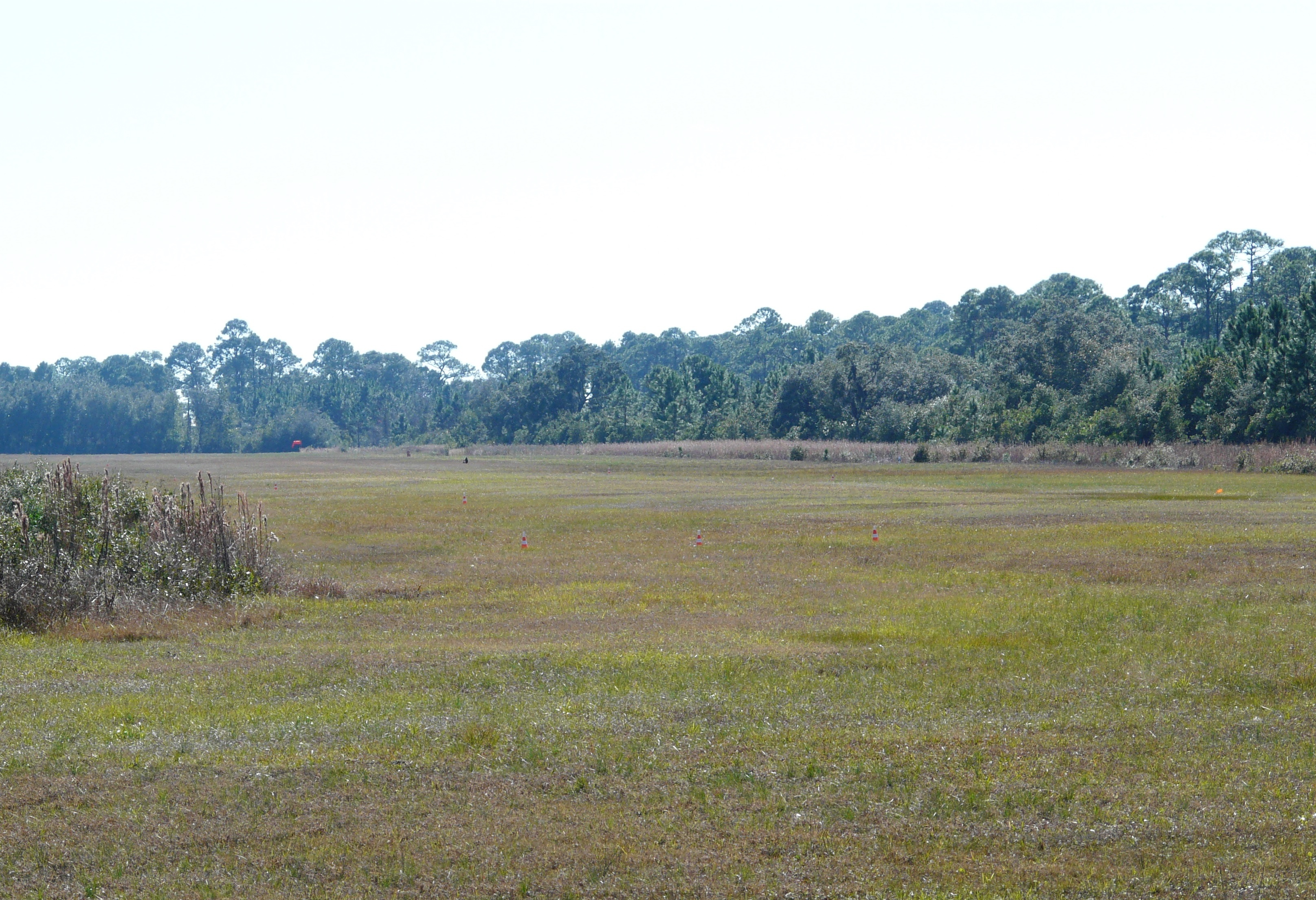
- Airport runway
- IATA: none; ICAO: none; FAA LID: 2J0

Summary
- Airport type: Public
- Owner: Wakulla County
- Serves: Panacea, Florida
- Opened: 1963
- Elevation AMSL: 11 ft / 3 m
- Coordinates: 29°59′22″N 084°23′43″W
- Interactive map of Wakulla County Airport

Runways
Direction	Length		Surface
Direction	ft	m	Surface
18/36	2,590	789	Turf

Statistics (2010)
- Aircraft operations: 5,475
- Based aircraft: 10
- Source: Federal Aviation Administration

Wakulla County Airport (FAA LID: 2J0) is a county-owned, public-use airport in Wakulla County, Florida, United States. It is located three nautical miles (6 km) south of the central business district of Panacea, Florida.

This general aviation airport is open to the public, although pilots are required to call ahead to be allowed ground access.

== Facilities and aircraft ==
Wakulla County Airport covers an area of 15 acres (6 ha) at an elevation of 11 feet (3 m) above mean sea level. It has one runway designated 18/36 with a turf surface measuring 2,590 by 70 feet (789 x 21 m).

For the 12-month period ending March 26, 2010, the airport had 5,475 general aviation aircraft operations, an average of 15 per day. At that time there were 10 aircraft based at this airport: 90% single-engine and 10% ultralight.

In January 2021 the Wakulla County Board of County Commissioners voted to support the establishment of an airport authority to operate the airport; an earlier attempt to establish an airport authority in 2020 failed.

== See also ==
- List of airports in Florida
