= Florida State Road 371 =

State highway in Florida, United States

State Road 371
- SR 371 in red, Former SR 371 in grey

Route information
- Maintained by FDOT
- Length: 5.689 mi (9.156 km)

Major junctions
- West end: SR 263 in Tallahassee
- East end: SR 366 in Tallahassee

Location
- Country: United States
- State: Florida

Highway system
- Florida State Highway System; Interstate; US; State; Former; Pre‑1945; Toll; Scenic
← SR 369	→ SR 373

State Road 371 (SR 371) runs through Tallahassee as a primarily east west route. In 2018, the Florida Legislature designated the Orange Avenue section of the roadway as C.K. Steele Memorial Highway.

Its western terminus is at State Road 263/Capital Circle; it runs eastwards along Orange Avenue to Lake Bradford Road. Leaving Orange to continue eastwards as State Road 373, it turns north on Lake Bradford Road until reaching Gaines Street.

State Road 371 is an important route through Florida State University, as it passes next to Doak Campbell Stadium.

== Major intersections ==
The entire route is in Tallahassee, Leon County.

mi	km	Destinations	Notes
0.000	0.000	SR 263 (Capital Circle) – Airport	
1.573	2.531	CR 2205 south (Lake Bradford Road)	
2.640	4.249	SR 373 east (Orange Avenue West)	
3.216	5.176	CR 373A south (Springhill Road)	
4.430	7.129	SR 366 west (Stadium Drive)	north end of state maintenance
1.000 mi = 1.609 km; 1.000 km = 0.621 mi
