= Capital Circle (Tallahassee, Florida) =

Coordinates: 30.4806127°N 84.2351242°W

Capital Circle is a three-quarter, non-limited-access beltway around the western, southern and eastern sides of Tallahassee, Florida in the United States.

- For the western half, see State Road 263
- For the eastern half, see U.S. Route 319/State Road 261
