= Medart, Florida =

- Unincorporated community
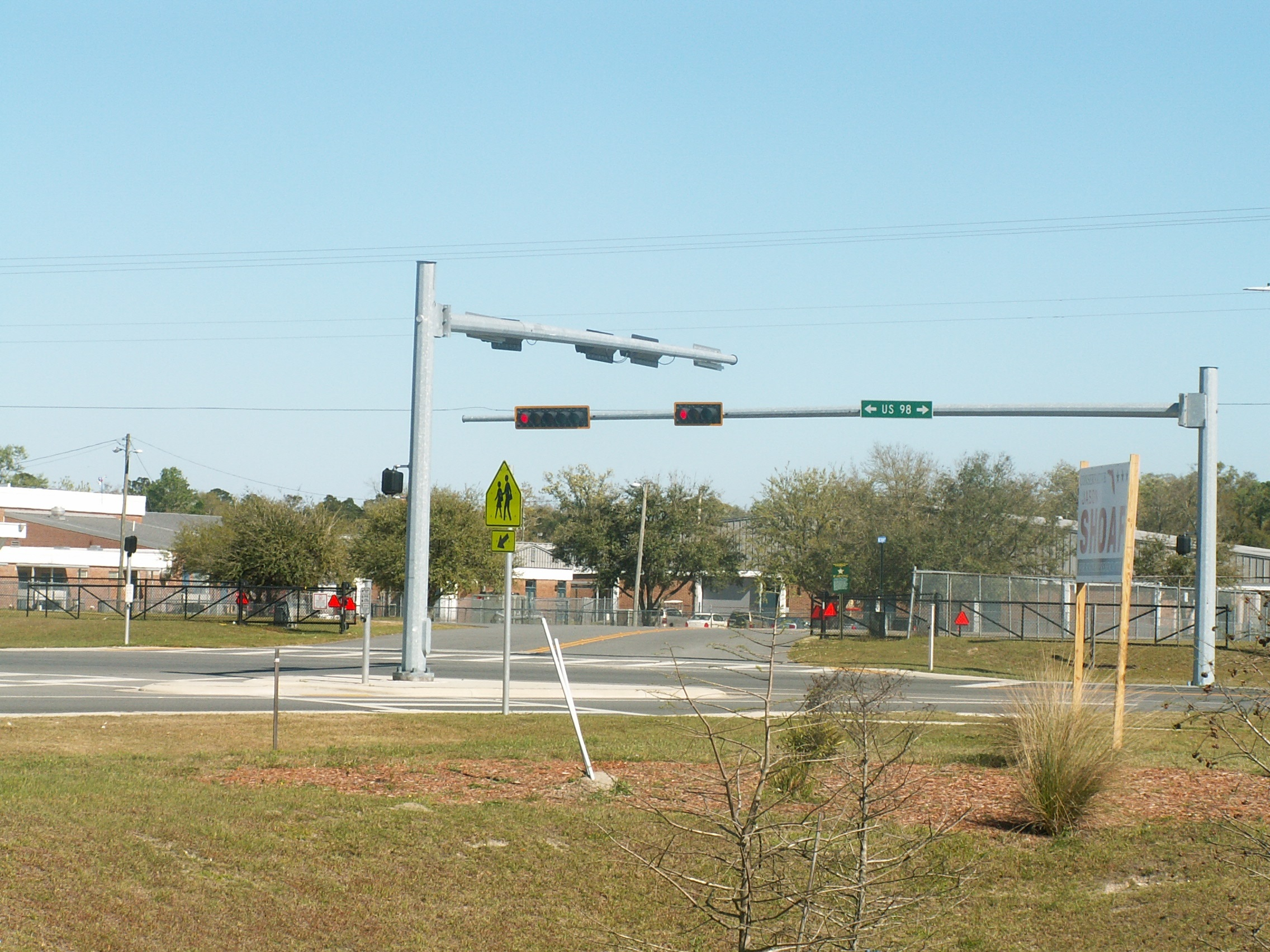
- Intersection of US-98 and US-319 in Medart

- Location within Florida
- Coordinates: 30°06′25″N 84°22′44″W
- Country: United States
- State: Florida
- County: Wakulla
- First settled: 1848
- Elevation: 33 ft (10 m)
- Time zone: UTC-5 (Eastern (EST))
  - Summer (DST): UTC-4 (EDT)
- Area code: 850
- GNIS feature ID: 306026

Medart is an unincorporated community in Wakulla County, Florida, United States.

== History ==
James Wolf Smith, born in Pawtucket, in 1813, was the first recorded settler of the area, moving in the area of Medart in 1848. His plantation, initially called Pawtuxet, later became the community of Medart.

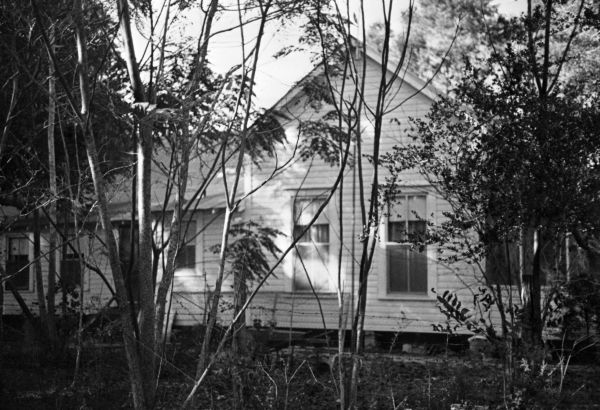
The house of founder James Wolf Smith, first known building in the current community's area

== Demographics ==
These are the ethnic datas according to local census, as of July 2025.

White	93.1%
Hispanic	2.9%
Black	2.3%
Asian	0.0%
Native American	1.7%

== Schools in Medart ==
- Medart Elementary School
- Wakulla Middle School
- Wakulla High School
