= Crawfordville, Florida =

- Census-Designated Place
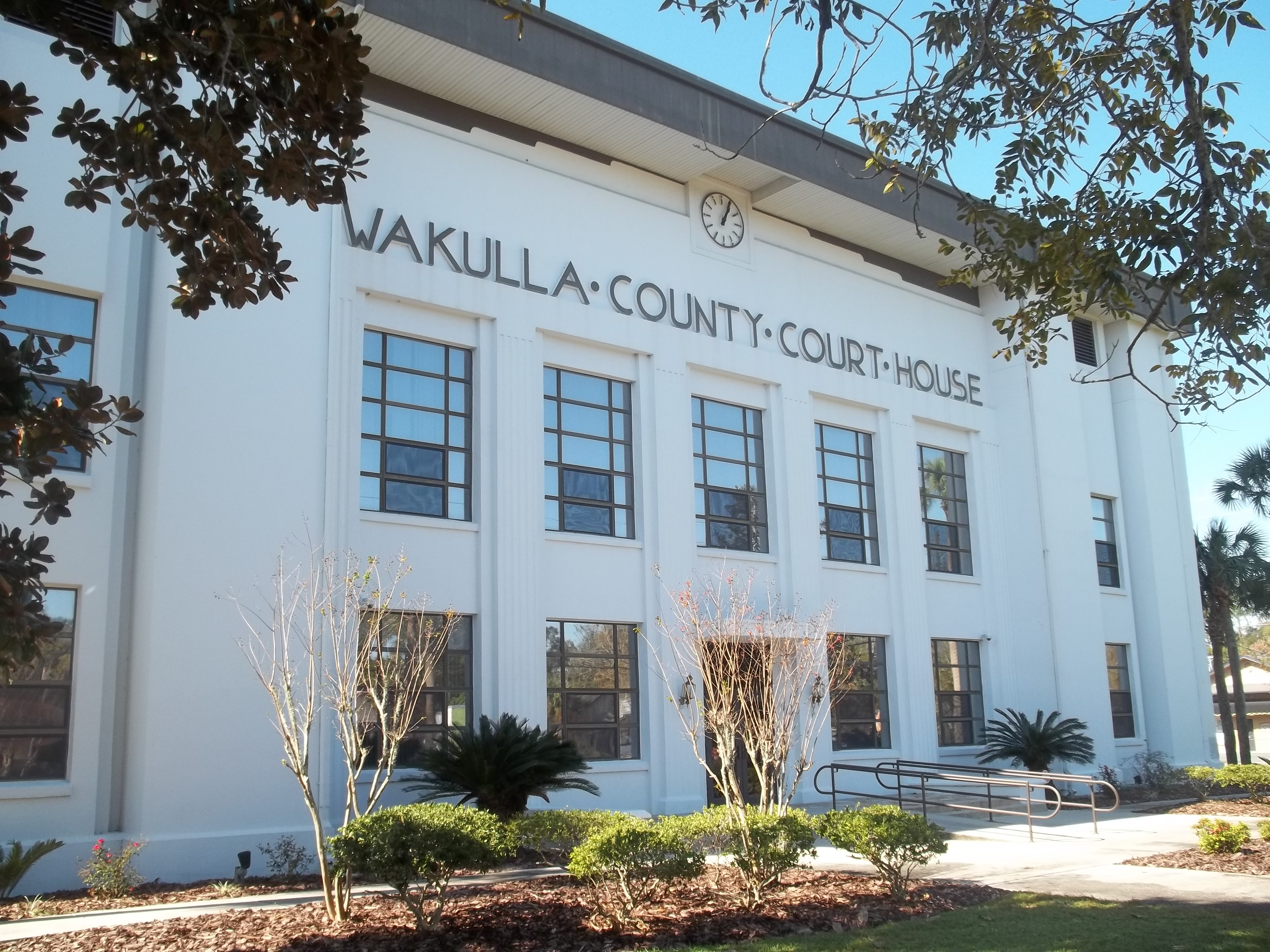
- Wakulla County Courthouse

- Location in Wakulla County and the state of Florida
- Coordinates: 30°11′46″N 84°22′18″W
- Country: United States
- State: Florida
- County: Wakulla

Government

Area
  - Census-Designated Place: 4.57 sq mi (11.83 km^{2})
  - Land: 4.57 sq mi (11.83 km^{2})
  - Water: 0 sq mi (0.00 km^{2})
  - Urban: 9.72 sq mi (25.17 km^{2})
- Elevation: 16 ft (4.9 m)

Population (2020)
  - Census-Designated Place: 4,853
  - Density: 1,062.3/sq mi (410.14/km^{2})
  - Urban: 10,124
  - Urban density: 1,041.7/sq mi (402.22/km^{2})
- Time zone: UTC-5 (Eastern (EST))
  - Summer (DST): UTC-4 (EDT)
- ZIP code: 32327
- Area code: 850
- FIPS code: 12-15300
- GNIS feature ID: 2583338

Crawfordville is an unincorporated community, census-designated place (CDP), and county seat of Wakulla County, Florida, United States. The population at the 2020 census was 4,853, up from 3,702 at the 2010 census. It is part of the Tallahassee metropolitan area.

== Demographics ==
Crawfordville first appeared as a census designated place in the 2010 U.S. census.

=== 2020 census ===
As of the 2020 census, Crawfordville had a population of 4,853. The median age was 38.8 years. 24.1% of residents were under the age of 18 and 14.0% of residents were 65 years of age or older. For every 100 females there were 98.4 males, and for every 100 females age 18 and over there were 101.1 males age 18 and over.

99.5% of residents lived in urban areas, while 0.5% lived in rural areas.

There were 1,759 households in Crawfordville, of which 36.2% had children under the age of 18 living in them. Of all households, 51.4% were married-couple households, 13.8% were households with a male householder and no spouse or partner present, and 29.3% were households with a female householder and no spouse or partner present. About 23.9% of all households were made up of individuals and 11.6% had someone living alone who was 65 years of age or older.

There were 1,856 housing units, of which 5.2% were vacant. The homeowner vacancy rate was 1.8% and the rental vacancy rate was 7.1%.

Racial composition as of the 2020 census
| Race | Number | Percent |
|---|---|---|
| White | 3,695 | 76.1% |
| Black or African American | 626 | 12.9% |
| American Indian and Alaska Native | 19 | 0.4% |
| Asian | 58 | 1.2% |
| Native Hawaiian and Other Pacific Islander | 13 | 0.3% |
| Some other race | 150 | 3.1% |
| Two or more races | 292 | 6.0% |
| Hispanic or Latino (of any race) | 323 | 6.7% |

=== Demographic estimates ===
Census Bureau profile data reported 1,234 families, 4.6% of the population under age 5, and females comprising 50.2% of the population.

=== Income and poverty ===
The median household income was $92,813. 1.9% of the population lived below the poverty threshold, including 3.0% of those under 18 and 5.3% of those over 65. 94.8% of the population 25 years and older had a high school degree or equivalent or higher and 20.3% of that same population had a bachelor's degree or higher. 13.5% of the population were veterans.

== Transportation ==
=== Aviation ===
- Tallahassee International Airport (TLH) – 18.0 mi. to north
- Wakulla County Airport (2J0) – 14.8 mi. south

=== Major highways ===
- U.S. Route 319 runs north and south through town as Crawfordville Highway.
- State Road 61 enters town from the south as Crawfordville Highway (concurrent with U.S. 319), turns northeast at the southern edge of town following Shadeville Road.

== Notable people ==
- Cecil H. Bolton, Medal of Honor recipient, was born in Crawfordville.
- Nigel Bradham, Philadelphia Eagles linebacker
- Feleipe Franks, quarterback and tight end for the Atlanta Falcons
- Alvin Hall, Financial advisor and media personality
