= Shell Point, Florida =

Unincorporated community in Florida, U.S.

- Unincorporated community
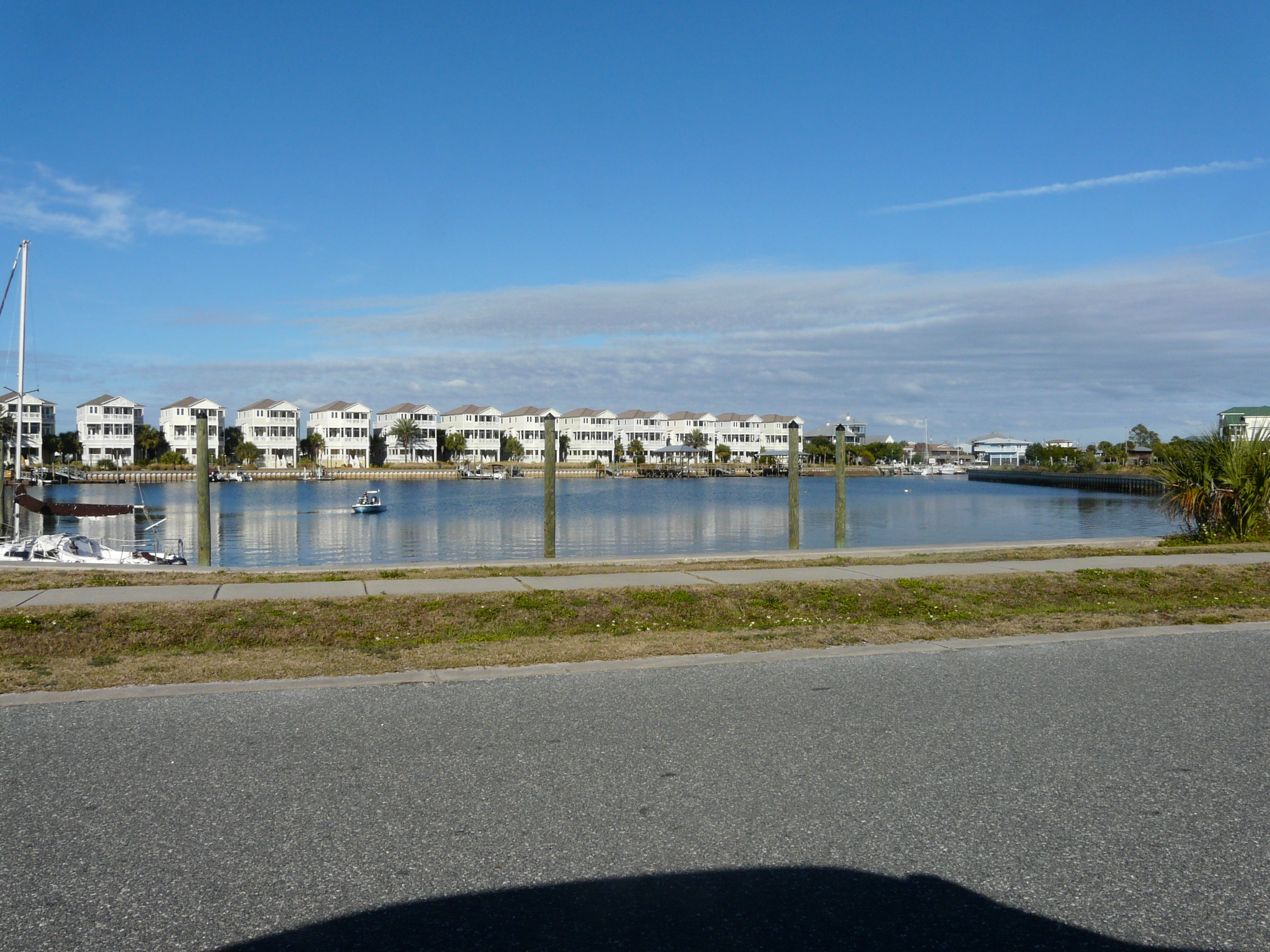
- Boat basin and homes in Shell Point

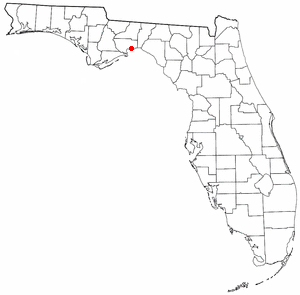
- Location in Wakulla County and the state of Florida
- Coordinates: 30.0575°N 84.2912°W
- Country: United States
- State: Florida
- County: Wakulla

Shell Point is an unincorporated community in Wakulla County, Florida, United States. Shell Point is located on the northern edge of Apalachee Bay, approximately 30 miles south of Tallahassee. Most notable for its family-oriented beach, Shell Point Beach was previously privately owned. After a petition by local groups to the state of Florida in 1995, the beach is funded by grants from the state and managed by the Wakulla County Department of Parks and Recreation services. Shell Point Beach is located in an Opportunity Zone, which is a federal tax incentive for investment in such designated areas.
