= Wakulla County, Florida =

County in Florida, United States

- County
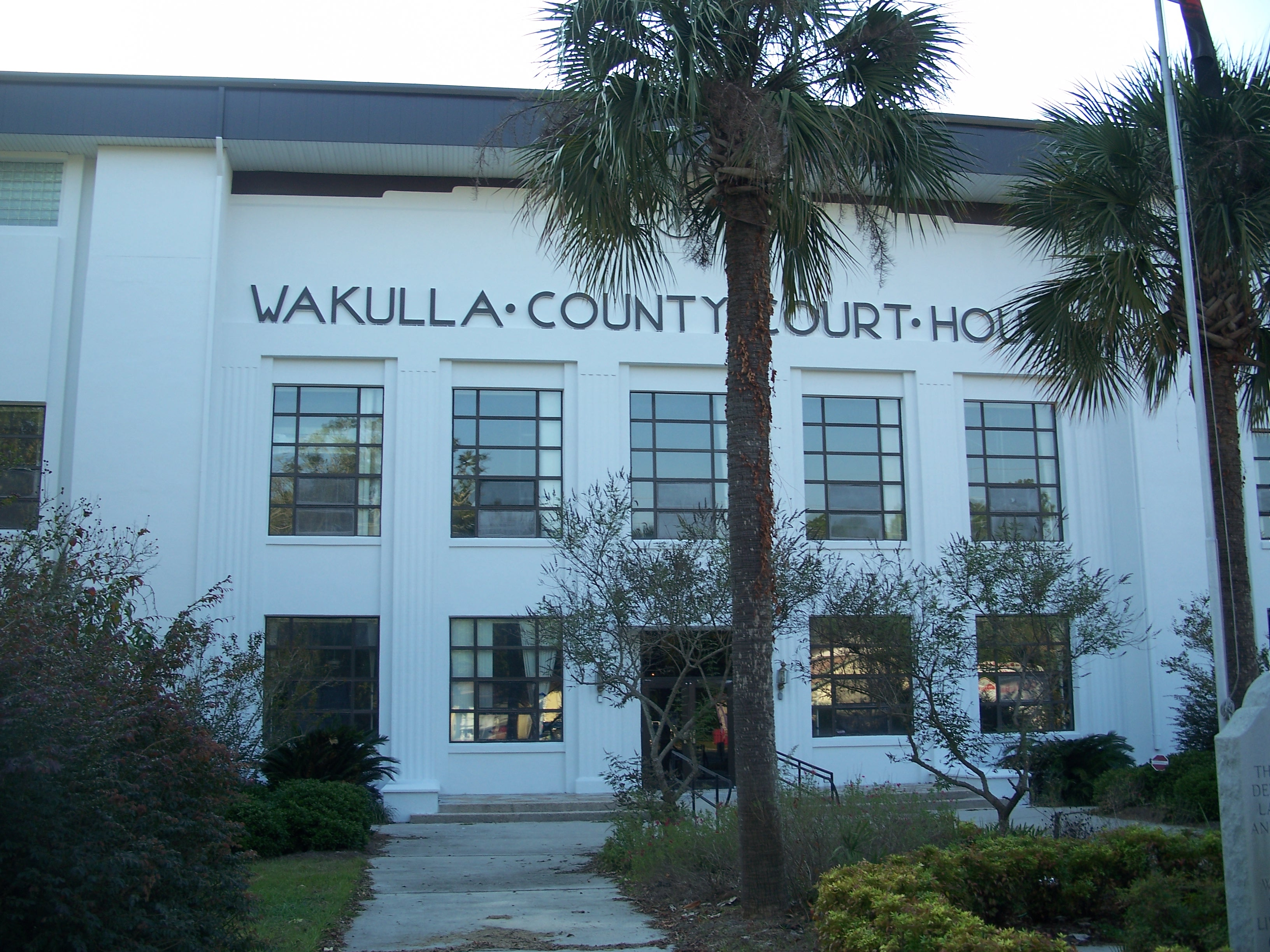
- Wakulla County Courthouse

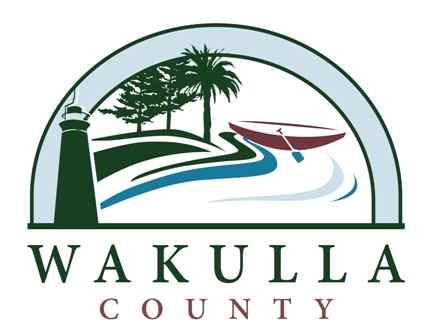
- Seal

- Location within the U.S. state of Florida
- Coordinates: 30°09′N 84°23′W
- Country: United States
- State: Florida
- Founded: March 11, 1843
- Named for: Wakulla River
- Seat: Crawfordville
- Largest city: Sopchoppy

Area
  - Total: 736 sq mi (1,910 km^{2})
  - Land: 606 sq mi (1,570 km^{2})
  - Water: 129 sq mi (330 km^{2}) 17.6%

Population (2020)
  - Total: 33,764
  - Estimate (2025): 38,089 ▲
  - Density: 55.7/sq mi (21.5/km^{2})
- Time zone: UTC−5 (Eastern)
  - Summer (DST): UTC−4 (EDT)
- Congressional district: 2nd
- Website: www.mywakulla.com

Wakulla County is a county located in the Big Bend region in the northern portion of the U.S. state of Florida. As of the 2020 census, the population was 33,764. Its county seat is Crawfordville. Wakulla County is part of the Tallahassee, Florida Metropolitan Statistical Area. Wakulla County has a near-absence of any municipal population, with two small municipalities holding about 3% of the population. Crawfordville is one of only two unincorporated county seats among Florida's 67 counties, the other being East Naples of Collier County.

== History ==
=== First Spanish period ===
In 1528, Pánfilo de Narváez found his way to what would be Wakulla County from the future Pinellas County, Florida, camping at the confluence of the Wakulla and St. Marks rivers. Narváez determined this was a very suitable spot for a fort. In 1539, Hernando de Soto's expedition passed through La Florida with a similar route.

The Fort San Marcos de Apalache began with a wooden fort in the late 1600s. The vicinity around the fort was not settled until 1733. Spanish colonial officials began constructing a stone fort, which was unfinished in the mid-1760s when Great Britain took over.

=== British period ===
The British divided Florida into East Florida, which included present-day Wakulla County, and West Florida. The boundary was the Apalachicola River; at that time, West Florida extended all the way to the Mississippi River. Twenty years later when the Spanish returned, they kept the East and West divisions, with the administrative capitals remaining at St. Augustine and Pensacola, respectively.

=== Second Spanish period ===
The area to become Wakulla County was an active place in the early 19th century. A former British officer named William Augustus Bowles attempted to unify and lead 400 Creek Indians against the Spanish outpost of San Marcos, capturing it. This provoked Spain, and a Spanish flotilla arrived some five weeks later to restore control.

In 1818, General Andrew Jackson invaded the area, capturing Fort San Marcos. Two captive British citizens, Robert Ambrister and Alexander Arbuthnot, were tried, found guilty of inciting Indian raids, and executed under Jackson's authority – causing a diplomatic nightmare between the U.S. and Britain. The U.S. Army garrison of 200 infantry and artillery men occupied the fort for the better part of a year (1818–1819).

In 1821, Florida was ceded to the United States and Fort St. Marks, as the Americans called it, was again garrisoned by U.S. troops.

=== Florida's territorial period ===
In 1824, the fort was abandoned and turned over to the Territory of Florida.

By 1839, the fort was returned to the Federal government and a merchant marine hospital was built. The hospital provided care for seamen and area yellow fever victims.

==== American forts in Wakulla County ====
- 1840 - Camp Lawson, northwest of Wakulla and northeast of Ivan, on the St. Marks River. A log stockade also known as Fort Lawson (2).
- 1841-1842 - Fort Many located near Wakulla Springs.
- 1839 - Fort Number Five (M) located near Sopchoppy.
- 1839-1843 - Fort Stansbury was located on the Wakulla River 9 miles (14 km) from St. Marks.
- 1841-1843 - Fort Port Leon. Abandoned after a hurricane destroyed it. Site was later used for a CSA Army artillery battery.
- 1839 - James Island Post located on James Island.

=== Antebellum Wakulla ===
Wakulla County was created from Leon County in 1843. It may (although this is disputed) be named for the Timucuan Indian word for "spring of water" or "mysterious water". This is in reference to Wakulla County's greatest natural attraction, Wakulla Springs, which is one of the world's largest freshwater springs, both in terms of depth and water flow. In 1974, the water flow was measured at 1.23 billion US gallons (4,700,000 m^{3}) per day—the greatest recorded flow ever for a single spring.

In an 1856 book, adventurer Charles Lanman wrote of the springs:

An adequate idea of this mammoth spring could never be given by pen or pencil; but when once seen, on a bright calm day, it must ever after be a thing to dream about and love. It is the fountain-head of a river... and is of sufficient volume to float a steamboat, if such an affair had yet dared to penetrate this solemn wilderness... It wells up in the very heart of a dense cypress swamp, is nearly round in shape, measures some four hundred feet in diameter, and is in depth about one hundred and fifty feet, having at its bottom an immense horizontal chasm, with a dark portal, from one side of which looms up a limestone cliff, the summit of which is itself nearly fifty feet beneath the spectator, who gazes upon it from the sides of a tiny boat. The water is so astonishlingly clear that even a pin can be seen on the bottom in the deepest places, and of course every animate and inanimate object which it contains is fully exposed to view. The apparent color of the water from the shore is greenish, but as you look perpendicularly into it, it is colorless as air, and the sensation of floating upon it is that of being suspended in a balloon; and the water is so refractive, that when the sun shines brilliantly every object you see is enveloped in the most fascinating prismatic hues.

Another possible origin for the name Wakulla, not as widely accepted, is that it means "mist" or "misting", perhaps in reference to the Wakulla Volcano, a 19th-century phenomenon in which a column of smoke could be seen emerging from the swamp for miles.

The town of Port Leon was once a thriving cotton-shipping hub, with a railroad from Tallahassee that carried over 50,000 tons of cotton a year to be put on ships, usually for shipment direct to Europe. Port Leon was the sixth-largest town in Florida, with 1,500 residents. However, a hurricane and the accompanying storm surge wiped out the entire town. New Port (today known as Newport, Florida) was built two miles (3 km) upstream but never quite achieved the prosperity of Port Leon.

=== Civil War ===
During the Civil War, Wakulla County was blockaded from 1861 to 1865 by a Union Navy squadron at the mouth of the St. Marks River. Confederates took the old Spanish fort known as San Marcos de Apalache, or Fort St. Marks, and renamed it Fort Ward.

The Battle of Natural Bridge eventually stopped the Union force that intended to take Fort Ward and nearby Tallahassee, the only Confederate state capital other than Austin, Texas which had not been captured. The Union was not able to land all of its forces, but they still outnumbered the Confederates, who chose to make their stand at a place where the St. Marks River goes underground: the "Natural Bridge" referred to. However, the Confederate Army had over a day to prepare its defenses, and the Union Army retreated. Most of the dead were African-American Union soldiers.

=== 20th century and beyond ===
In Gloria Jahoda's book The Other Florida, she writes movingly of the extreme poverty of Wakulla County from the early 1900s to 1966 when Wakulla still had no doctor and no dentist, few stores, and a county newspaper produced just once a month on a mimeograph machine.

Today, Wakulla has several doctors and dentists, several supermarkets and chain retailers, a golf resort, and multiple seafood markets and companies.

== Etymology ==
The name Wakulla is corrupted from Guacara. Guacara is a Spanish phonetic spelling of an original Indian name, and Wakulla is a Muskhogean pronunciation of Guacara. The Spanish "Gua" is the equivalent of the Creek "wa", and as the Creek alphabet does not exhibit an "R" sound, the second element "cara" would have been pronounced "kala" by the Creeks. The Creek voiceless "L" is always substituted for the Spanish "R". Thus the word Guacara was pronounced Wakala by the Seminoles who are Muskhogean in their origin and language.

Because Wakulla was probably a Timucuan word, it is unlikely that its meaning will ever be known. It may contain the word kala, which signified a "spring of water" in some Indian dialects.. It may refer to the Whip-poor-will, known as waxkula in Creek.

== Geography ==
According to the U.S. Census Bureau, the county has a total area of 736 square miles (1,910 km^{2}), of which 606 square miles (1,570 km^{2}) is land and 129 square miles (330 km^{2}) (17.6%) is water.

Wakulla County was added to the Tallahassee, Florida Metropolitan Statistical Area (MSA) in 1973. The county was removed from the Tallahassee MSA in 1983. It was re-added to the MSA (for the second time) in 2003.

=== Adjacent counties ===
- Leon County - north
- Liberty County - west
- Franklin County - southwest
- Jefferson County - east

=== National protected areas ===
- Apalachicola National Forest (part)
- St. Marks National Wildlife Refuge (part)

=== State and local protected areas ===
- Ochlockonee River State Park
- San Marcos de Apalache Historic State Park
- Wakulla Springs State Park

== Demographics ==
Historical population
Census	Pop.	Note	%±
1850	1,955		—
1860	2,839		45.2%
1870	2,506		−11.7%
1880	2,723		8.7%
1890	3,117		14.5%
1900	5,149		65.2%
1910	4,802		−6.7%
1920	5,129		6.8%
1930	5,468		6.6%
1940	5,463		−0.1%
1950	5,258		−3.8%
1960	5,257		0.0%
1970	6,308		20.0%
1980	10,887		72.6%
1990	14,202		30.4%
2000	22,863		61.0%
2010	30,776		34.6%
2020	33,764		9.7%
2025 (est.)	38,089	▲	12.8%
U.S. Decennial Census; 1790-1960 1900-1990; 1990-2000 2010-2015 2019

=== 2020 census ===
As of the 2020 census, the county had a population of 33,764 and 8,362 families residing in the county. The median age was 42.7 years, with 20.5% of residents under the age of 18 and 17.3% aged 65 or older. For every 100 females there were 117.2 males, and for every 100 females age 18 and over there were 120.8 males age 18 and over.

There were 11,970 households in the county, of which 32.0% had children under the age of 18 living in them. Of all households, 53.0% were married-couple households, 16.4% were households with a male householder and no spouse or partner present, and 23.6% were households with a female householder and no spouse or partner present. About 23.9% of all households were made up of individuals and 11.5% had someone living alone who was 65 years of age or older.

There were 13,633 housing units, of which 12.2% were vacant. Among occupied housing units, 81.2% were owner-occupied and 18.8% were renter-occupied. The homeowner vacancy rate was 1.4% and the rental vacancy rate was 7.5%.

30.0% of residents lived in urban areas, while 70.0% lived in rural areas.

=== Racial and ethnic composition ===
Wakulla County, Florida – Racial and ethnic composition Note: the US Census treats Hispanic/Latino as an ethnic category. This table excludes Latinos from the racial categories and assigns them to a separate category. Hispanics/Latinos may be of any race.
Race / Ethnicity (NH = Non-Hispanic)	Pop 1980	Pop 1990	Pop 2000	Pop 2010	Pop 2020	% 1980	% 1990	% 2000	% 2010	% 2020
White alone (NH)	8,948	12,162	19,393	24,472	25,987	82.19%	85.64%	84.82%	79.52%	76.97%
Black or African American alone (NH)	1,785	1,830	2,586	4,406	4,202	16.40%	12.89%	11.31%	14.32%	12.45%
Native American or Alaska Native alone (NH)	35	94	124	174	154	0.32%	0.66%	0.54%	0.57%	0.46%
Asian alone (NH)	11	30	56	166	198	0.10%	0.21%	0.24%	0.54%	0.59%
Native Hawaiian or Pacific Islander alone (NH)	x	x	7	17	19	x	x	0.03%	0.06%	0.06%
Other race alone (NH)	5	3	20	29	126	0.05%	0.02%	0.09%	0.09%	0.37%
Mixed race or Multiracial (NH)	x	x	234	496	1,501	x	x	1.02%	1.61%	4.45%
Hispanic or Latino (any race)	103	83	443	1,016	1,577	0.95%	0.58%	1.94%	3.30%	4.67%
Total	10,887	14,202	22,863	30,776	33,764	100.00%	100.00%	100.00%	100.00%	100.00%

=== 2000 census ===
As of the census of 2000, there were 22,863 people, 8,450 households, and 6,236 families residing in the county. The population density was 38 inhabitants per square mile (15/km^{2}). There were 9,820 housing units at an average density of 16 per square mile (6/km^{2}). The racial makeup of the county was 86.10% White, 11.51% Black or African American, 0.59% Native American, 0.25% Asian, 0.03% Pacific Islander, 0.29% from other races, and 1.23% from two or more races. 1.94% of the population were Hispanic or Latino of any race.

There were 8,450 households, out of which 35.60% had children under the age of 18 living with them, 57.10% were married couples living together, 12.40% had a female householder with no husband present, and 26.20% were non-families. 22.00% of all households were made up of individuals, and 7.00% had someone living alone who was 65 years of age or older. The average household size was 2.57 and the average family size was 2.99. In the county, the population was spread out, with 25.60% under the age of 18, 7.60% from 18 to 24, 31.70% from 25 to 44, 24.70% from 45 to 64, and 10.30% who were 65 years of age or older. The median age was 37 years. For every 100 females, there were 107.30 males. For every 100 females age 18 and over, there were 106.80 males.

The median income for a household in the county was $37,149, and the median income for a family was $42,222. Males had a median income of $29,845 versus $24,330 for females. The per capita income for the county was $17,678. About 9.30% of families and 11.30% of the population were below the poverty line, including 15.40% of those under age 18 and 15.10% of those age 65 or over.

== Politics ==
United States presidential election results for Wakulla County, Florida
Year	Republican		Democratic		Third party(ies)	
Year	No.	%	No.	%	No.	%
1904	39	13.78%	233	82.33%	11	3.89%
1908	56	16.28%	239	69.48%	49	14.24%
1912	25	8.96%	215	77.06%	39	13.98%
1916	121	21.49%	387	68.74%	55	9.77%
1920	119	17.81%	530	79.34%	19	2.84%
1924	34	8.74%	332	85.35%	23	5.91%
1928	66	12.18%	470	86.72%	6	1.11%
1932	20	1.89%	1,036	98.11%	0	0.00%
1936	45	3.08%	1,417	96.92%	0	0.00%
1940	70	4.98%	1,336	95.02%	0	0.00%
1944	73	6.69%	1,018	93.31%	0	0.00%
1948	72	5.22%	997	72.30%	310	22.48%
1952	375	24.24%	1,172	75.76%	0	0.00%
1956	393	26.79%	1,074	73.21%	0	0.00%
1960	379	24.85%	1,146	75.15%	0	0.00%
1964	1,270	62.78%	753	37.22%	0	0.00%
1968	247	10.49%	440	18.68%	1,668	70.83%
1972	2,466	82.01%	539	17.92%	2	0.07%
1976	1,580	38.80%	2,353	57.78%	139	3.41%
1980	2,021	47.26%	2,082	48.69%	173	4.05%
1984	3,088	67.75%	1,470	32.25%	0	0.00%
1988	3,158	65.72%	1,605	33.40%	42	0.87%
1992	2,586	38.52%	2,320	34.55%	1,808	26.93%
1996	2,933	40.91%	3,056	42.63%	1,180	16.46%
2000	4,512	52.54%	3,838	44.70%	237	2.76%
2004	6,777	57.61%	4,896	41.62%	90	0.77%
2008	8,877	61.75%	5,311	36.94%	188	1.31%
2012	9,290	63.21%	5,175	35.21%	232	1.58%
2016	10,512	68.07%	4,348	28.15%	584	3.78%
2020	12,874	69.79%	5,351	29.01%	223	1.21%
2024	14,246	71.51%	5,441	27.31%	236	1.18%

=== County representation ===
Wakulla County Government
Position	Name	Party
Commissioner	Ralph Thomas	Republican
Commissioner	Fred Nichols II	Republican
Commissioner	Valerie Russell	Republican
Commissioner	Quincee MesserSmith	Republican
Commissioner	Josh Lawhon	Republican
Sheriff	Jared Miller	Republican
County Judge	Brian Miller	Republican
Clerk of the Court	Greg James	Republican
Property Appraiser	Ed Brimner	Republican
School Superintendent	Bobby Pearce	Republican
Elections Supervisor	Joe Morgan	Republican
Tax Collector	Liza Craze	Republican

== Transportation ==
=== Roads ===
- US 98
- US 319
- SR 61
- SR 267
- SR 363

=== Railroads ===
No railroads currently operate within Wakulla County, but it was formerly served by two different railroads.

The Georgia, Florida and Alabama Railroad, completed in 1893, passed through Sopchoppy on its route between Tallahassee and Carrabelle until its abandonment in 1948. South of Sopchoppy, the line followed H.T. Smith Road. The railroad bridge crossing the Ochlocknee River at MacIntyre still exists as pilings blocking all but a portion of the river on the south side.

The Tallahassee Railroad, the first railroad in Florida, was completed in 1836 and was abandoned by its successor, the Seaboard Coast Line Railroad, in 1983. Sixteen miles (26 km) of that right-of-way became the Tallahassee-St. Marks Historic Railroad State Trail in 1988.

=== Airports ===
The Wakulla County Airport (2J0), located south of Panacea, is a small public-use airport with a single 2,600-foot (790 m), north–south turf runway. This airfield was originally constructed during World War II, as an emergency landing strip for Army Air Corps aircraft which trained and patrolled along the Gulf Coast, most of which belonged to the 3rd Army Air Corps out of Dale Mabry Field Army Air Base in Tallahassee. After the war, the air strip was turned over to the county for civilian uses.

=== Seaports ===
St. Marks is a small commercial seaport. Panacea and Ochlockonee Bay also support small fishing fleets.

== Education ==
Wakulla County is served by the Wakulla school district with the following schools:

- Crawfordville Elementary School
- C.O.A.S.T. Charter School
- Medart Elementary School
- Shadeville Elementary School
- Riversink Elementary School
- Riversprings Middle School
- Wakulla Middle School
- Wakulla High School
- Wakulla Christian School

The former Sopchoppy Elementary School now serves as the Sopchoppy Education Center, a Pre-K, adult, and second chance school.

The former Shadeville High School served African-American students from 1931 to 1967.

=== Library ===
The Wakulla County Public Library is the main library of Wakulla County and is a part of the Wilderness Coast Public Libraries.

== Communities ==
=== Cities ===
- Sopchoppy
- St. Marks

=== Census-designated places ===
- Crawfordville (county seat)
- Panacea

=== Other unincorporated communities ===
- Arran
- Buckhorn
- Curtis Mills
- Hyde Park
- Ivan
- Magnolia
- Medart
- Newport
- Port Leon
- Sanborn
- Shadeville
- Shell Point
- Smith Creek
- Spring Creek
- Wakulla
- Wakulla Beach

== See also ==
- National Register of Historic Places listings in Wakulla County, Florida
- Andrew Hargrett
