= Apalachee Bay =

Gulf of Mexico bay in Florida, US

Coordinates: 30°02′14″N 84°10′15″W

Apalachee Bay is a bay in the northeastern Gulf of Mexico occupying an indentation of the Florida coast to the west of where the Florida peninsula joins the United States mainland. It is bordered by Taylor, Jefferson, Wakulla, and Franklin counties.

The Aucilla, Econfina, St. Marks, and Ochlockonee rivers drain into the bay. Most of the bay's coast is the St. Marks National Wildlife Refuge. The mouth of the Bay stretches from Lighthouse Point on Saint Marks Island, in Wakulla County south of Bald Point State Park, to Rock Island in Taylor County.

== Name ==
Apalachee Bay is named for the Apalachee people which lived between the Aucilla and Ochlockonee rivers until early in the 18th century. The St. Marks River below where the Wakulla River joins it was at one time known as the Apalachee River. The meaning of "Apalachee" was not recorded, but in the Choctaw language, which is believed to be closely related to the Apalachee language, Apelachi means 'help' or 'helper', and Apelichi means 'the place in which to rule, preside, or govern in'.

== Geology ==
Most of the shoreline of Apalachee Bay is part of the Big Bend Coast, a drowned karst region, covered with salt marsh and mangrove forests. The western end of the bay, south of the mouth of the Ochlockonee River, is bordered by a sand beach at the eastern end of St. James Island, site of Bald Point State Park. There are barrier islands west of the Ochlockonee River, but there are no barrier islands elsewhere around the bay. The bay includes freshwater springs, and oyster reefs. The coast of Apalachee Bay has little or no sand or mud. The karst topography has produced an irregular, frequently exposed, bedrock surface. The lack of sand has been a feature of the Apalachee Bay coast since at least the Pleistocene. Sediment of Holocene origin is generally limited to salt marshes and the nearshore zone, and is redistributed by tidal action and storm events. The coast of Apalachee Bay is on the Gulf Coastal Lowlands of Florida, which has recently exposed ocean-smoothed terraces with Tertiary limestone at or just below the surface. The presence of a high water table has produced a karst landscape. The limestone hosts the Florida aquifer, which reaches the surface near the coast. Steady discharge from the aquifer supports the discharge of the many springs feeding rivers and streams along the coast and maintains a high water table near the coast.

== Rivers and other freshwater sources ==
The Aucilla, Econfina, St. Marks, and Ochlockonee rivers drain into the bay. All of the rivers that reach the Gulf of Mexico along the coast of Apalachee Bay are partly spring-fed. The rivers and smaller streams flowing into Apalachee Bay lower the salinity of the nearshore water. The seasonality of rainfall produces seasonal variations in the salinity of the waters in Apalachee Bay. Rainfall from tropical cyclones may also lower the salinity of nearshore waters. The shallowness of nearshore waters also mean that the water temperature is strongly affected by the air temperature. Tropical species may be killed by cold weather, or may migrate southward or to deeper water less subject to cooling in winter.

Besides rivers and streams, hundreds of springs (including submarine springs), fractures and seeps along the coast of Apalachee Bay contribute to the flow of freshwater into the Gulf of Mexico. The close proximity of the Florida aquifer to the surface with only a shallow soil layer over the porous limestone bedrock means that groundwater can emerge in many locations. A survey found hundreds of places along the coast which flows into the Gulf, including many under water in the Gulf. The authors of that study estimated that the discharge from the identified inland sources is equivalent to that of one 1st-magnitude spring for every 2 miles (3.2 km) of coast.

== History ==
=== Underwater archaeological sites ===
Beginning in the 1980s submerged archaeological sites have been identified and examined on the seabed of Apalachee Bay. During the height of the last glacial period, global sea levels were at least 100 metres (330 ft) lower than in the 20th Century. All of the Florida Platform would have been above sea level, with the west coast of the Florida peninsula being about 150 miles (240 km) west of the current coast. Sea levels were rising when the first people reached Florida late in the Pleistocene epoch. Sea level at the end of the Pleistocene epoch was about 40 metres (130 ft) lower than at present. By about 8,000 years Before Present (BP) sea level had risen to about 20 metres (66 ft) lower than at present. Because of the very gentle slope of the Florida platform, the ancient coastline was far to the west of the 20th Century coastline.

The lower sea levels of the late Pleistocene and early Holocene epochs resulted in a drier climate, a lower water table, and little surface water in Florida. Often in landscapes dominated by karst systems, such as the land adjacent to Apalachee Bay, including the formerly dry land currently submerged under the bay, the only available fresh water was in sinkholes along dried-up riverbeds.

Many sites where people were present in the late Pleistocene and early Holocene epochs have been found in the Big Bend region adjacent to Apalachee Bay, and particularly in sinkholes in the bed of the Aucilla River. Some of these sites show evidence of the presence of people in the late Pleistocene, even before the appearance of the Clovis culture (see Page-Ladson). The broad, shallow continental shelf under Apalachee Bay adjacent to a region with abundant archaeological sites led to the prediction that archaeological sites could be found on the formerly dry land that has since been submerged beneath the bay. Fifteen archaeological sites had been found on the seabed of Apalachee Bay by 1993.

The sea floor under Apalachee Bay was surveyed to identify now submerged river courses. Parts of the course of the Paleoaucilla, as well as fragments of possible ancient courses of other rivers were found, and sites with evidence of human activity have been found along them. Sites identified along the Paleoaucilla include the J&J Hunt Submerged Archaeological Site (8JE740), the Ontolo site (8JE1577) and Area 91-B (8JE781). Based on tools found and Radiocarbon dating, the J&J Hunt, Ontolo and Area 91-B sites were occupied from late in the Paleoindian period until the middle of the Archaic period.

West of the sites along the Paleoaucilla is the Fitch site (8JE739), on a channel that may be the Paleopinhook. (The Pinhook River is a short stream just to the west of the mouth of the Aucilla River.) The Fitch site is 10 kilometres (6.2 mi) from the mouth of the Aucilla River and 17 feet (5.2 m) under water. The Fitch site may have been used as a chert quarry early in the Archaic period, before 7500 years BP.

The Econfina Channel site (8TA139) is an archaeological site on what may be the ancient channel of the Econfina River. It is 5 kilometres (3.1 mi) offshore and under 2 to 5 metres (6.6 to 16.4 ft) of water. The site includes an area where stone tools were found and a shell midden, with a spring nearby. Radiocarbon dating of shells from the midden yielded dates of 4510 years BP +/- 461 years, and 2621 years BP +/- 423 years. The larger shell midden is on the south side of the paleochannel. It is about 30 metres (98 ft) long parallel to the paleochannel and about 20 metres (66 ft) across from the edge of the paleochannel into adjacent eelgrass beds, and is 0.5 to 1 metre (1.6 to 3.3 ft) thick. Additional shell middens up to 27 metres (89 ft) long have been found on the north side of the paleochannel. Putnam and Newnan points, which were used from 7000 to 5000 calibrated BP, have been recovered from the site. Radiocarbon dates for oyster shells in the middens range from 5500 to 3000 calibrated BP. The rising sea level submerged the site sometime after 4500 calibrated BP.

Ray Hole Spring (8TA171) is a site 19 miles (31 km) south of the Aucilla River in 35 feet (11 m) of water. The site was described as a sinkhole with a flowing spring in 1976. The hole appears to have been partially filled with debris since then, possibly as a result of turbulence from hurricanes that passed over Apalachee Bay. The site is associated with the “Ray Hole Trough”, part of the Paleoaucilla channel. A piece of southern live oak wood was found on the margin of the sinkhole at the bottom of a crevice under a lens of oyster shells. The wood was free of teredo worm damage, which indicates it was deposited in fresh water, likely in a hammock, and later covered by an oyster bed as the sea level rose. That sequence is supported by a radiocarbon date of 8220 BP for the wood, and 7440 BP for the oyster shells. Chert flakes that may be deteriorated debitage from tool manufacture were recovered from the margins of the sinkhole. Two debitage flakes that are clearly the result of human work have also been found at the site.

=== Aboriginal occupation ===
Paleo-Indians entered the vicinity of Apalachee Bay at least 12,000 years ago. Evidence of Paleo-Indian occupation near the present-day coast of Apalachee Bay has been found at Wakulla Springs and the Page-Ladson site. As the sea level were still much lower than at present, other sites are presumed to now be underwater. The sea level rose rapidly during the early part of the Archaic period, but by about 5,000 years ago the sea level was approaching present-day levels. Late in the Archaic period the Norwood culture developed in the Apalachee Region. It was one of the earlier cultures in North America to produce ceramics. The people of the Norwood culture created many shell mounds, including some that are now underwater. About 2,500 years ago the Deptford culture replace the Norwood culture along the coast of Apalachee Bay. The Deptford culture was oriented primarily towards the sea, living in coastal hammocks. The later Swift Creek and Weedon Island cultures were more oriented to inland resources, but the Bird Hammock site, close to the coast, was occupied during both of the Swift Creek and Weedon Island cultures.

=== Spanish period ===
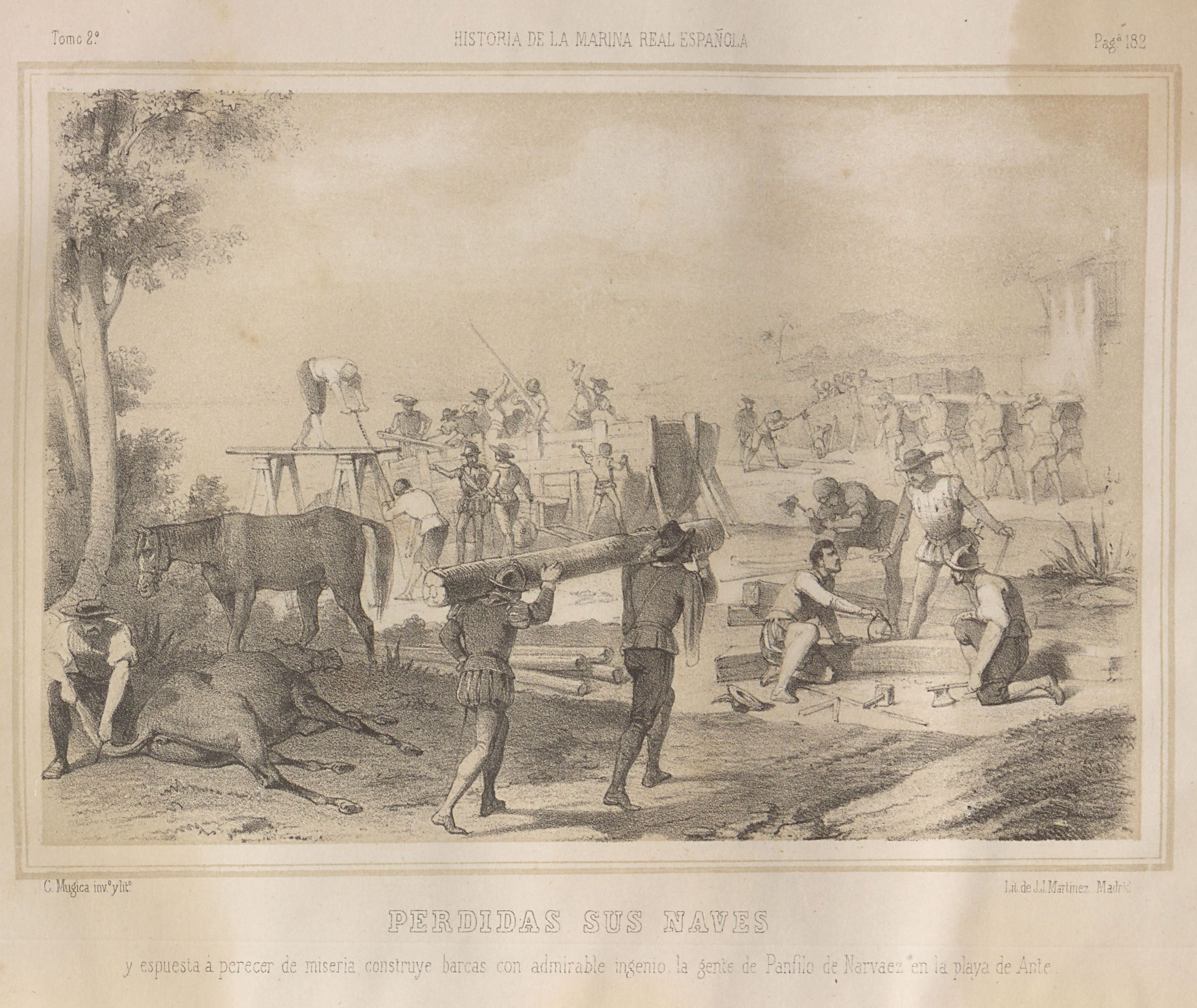
Narváez expedition in 1528, Apalachee Bay.

In July 1528, the Narváez expedition reached Apalachee Province. While there, the Spanish were attacked several times by Apalachees. Their own scouting and reports from natives convinced the Spanish that the land to the east and north of Apalachee was sparsely occupied and the few people who lived there were poor. The Spanish were told that a village to the south called Aute had a lot of corn, beans, squash, and, because it was near the sea, fish, and would be friendly. The Spanish moved to Aute, a trip of nine days. On reaching Aute the Spanish found it deserted and all the buildings burned, but crops in the fields were ready to be harvested. Scouts found a river nearby, but reported that the sea was still far away. The expedition then moved from Aute to the river.

The expedition had lost men to attacks, many of the men were sick, and there were not enough horses to carry the sick. Despairing of being able to continue by land, the men of the expedition decided to build ships and sail to New Spain. Lacking both the needed materials and the knowledge of how to build ships, the expedition improvised, forging woodworking tools from such iron objects as they had. They used palmetto fronds for caulking and made ropes from palmetto fronds and horsehair, sails from shirts, and water bags from horsehide. After six weeks they had built five rafts, but had lost another 50 men to illness or killed in attacks. They named the place where they had built the rafts the "Bay of Horses", after all the horses they had killed there. The five rafts carrying 242 men sailed downriver for seven days before reaching the open water of Apalachee Bay. The rafts then sailed west seeking New Spain. Only four men from the expedition eventually reached New Spain.

After the Hernando de Soto expedition reached Apalachee in 1539, a scouting party sent to the south identified the Narváez camp on a large bay off of Apalachee Bay. The Narvaez camp may have been at the Marsh Island Mound (archaeological site 8WA1) on the Wakulla River, or the St. Marks Wildlife Refuge Cemetery site (8WA15) on the St. Marks River.

By 1637, Spanish ships were calling in Apalachee Bay to supply the missions in Apalachee Province. Amacano people were living near the mouth of the Apalachicola River in 1637 when they guided Spanish ships to Apalachee Bay.

The port of San Marcos was established near the mouth of the St. Marks River sometime in the 17th century. Ships sailed between there and St. Augustine, Havana, and a port called San Martin that was established in the early 1670s on the Suwannee River. Produce from Apalachee Province going to St. Augustine and provisions and funds from St. Augustine going to Apalachee were sent on a route that used canoes to cross Apalachee Bay and traverse the Suwannee River and its tributary the Santa Fe River.

A mission was established in the town of Chaccabi near Apalachee Bay in 1674. The town was identified as Chine, with Amacano and Pacara people living there as well. Chaccabi was on a small stream identified as "Rio Chachave" on Spanish maps, flowing into western Apalachee Bay, and probably was what is today known as Spring Creek. The town was not mentioned after 1675. After an enemy ship appeared off San Marcos in 1677, villages near Apalachee Bay were ordered to move inland.

In 1718, the Spanish established the Presidio San Marcos de Apalachee at the existing port of San Marcos near the mouth of the St. Marks River.

== Storm surges ==
Due to the width of the adjacent continental shelf (over 150 kilometres (81 nmi)), low gradient slope of the coast (1:5000), and shelter from the usual wind direction of storms, the Big Bend Coast, including Apalachee Bay, is generally subject to low wave energy, but is subject to storm surges from hurricanes and other storms. Because of the great width and low slope of the continental shelf south of Apalachee Bay, storm surges are greater in height than those that occur on narrower and steeper continental shelves.

Storm surges that are known to have occurred in Apalachee Bay include:

- 1837 – A hurricane produced a 6-foot (1.8 m) storm surge at St. Marks on August 7.
- 1842 – The Gulf to Bermuda Hurricane of 1842 struck St. Marks as a major hurricane on October 5, producing a reported 20-foot (6.1 m) storm surge at Cedar Key.
- 1843 – The Port Leon Florida Hurricane of 1843 produced a storm surge at Port Leon on September 14 that killed 14 people and destroyed the town, which was then abandoned.
- 1851 – The Great Middle-Florida Hurricane made landfall at Cape San Blas on August 23, producing a reported 12-foot (3.7 m) storm surge at St. Marks.
- 1852 – A hurricane made landfall east of Apalachicola on October 9, producing a reported 7-foot (2.1 m) storm surge at Newport.
- 1863 – Hurricane "Amanda" made landfall west of Apalachicola on May 28, producing a storm surge at St. Marks that destroyed a saltworks, damaged the railroad line several miles inland, and killed a reported 40 people and 48 mules and oxen.
- 1966 – Hurricane Alma made landfall at the west end of Apalachee Bay on June 9, producing a storm surge of 4 to 10 feet (1.2 to 3.0 m) along the Big Bend Coast.

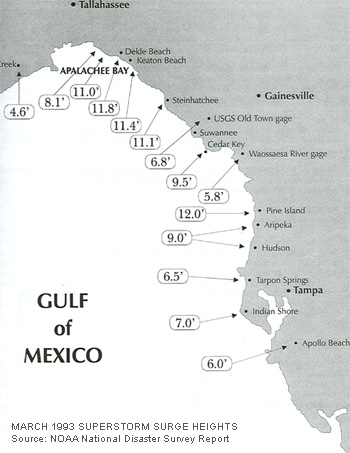
Storm surge heights for the No Name Storm of 1993

- 1993 – The No Name Storm of 1993 produced storm surges of 6 to 12 feet (1.8 to 3.7 m) along all of the Big Bend Coast.
- 1995 – Hurricane Allison made landfall near Alligator Point on June 5, producing storm surges of 6 to 8 feet (1.8 to 2.4 m) along the coasts of Wakulla and Dixie counties.
- 1998 – Hurricane Earl made landfall near Panama City, Florida on September 3. Surges caused by the storm were highest along the Big Bend Coast, up to 8 feet (2.4 m) on the coasts of Wakulla, Jefferson, and Taylor counties.
- 2016 – Hurricane Hermine made landfall east of St. Marks on September 2, producing a 5.8 feet (1.8 m) storm surge at Cedar Key.

== Sources ==
- Anuskiewicz, Richard J.; Dunbar, James S. (1993), "Evidence of Prehistoric Man at Ray Hole Springs: A Drowned Sinkhole Located 32 KM Offshore on the Continental Shelf in 12 M Seawater" (PDF), American Academy of Underwater Sciences Thirteenth Annual Scientific Diving Symposium, American Academy of Underwater Sciences
- Barnes, Jay (1998). Florida's Hurricane History. Chapel Hill, North Carolina: The University of North Carolina Press. ISBN 978-0-8078-4748-0.
- Cabeza de Vaca, Álvar Núñez (2003). Adorno, Rolena; Pautz, Patrick Charles (eds.). The Narrative of Cabeza de Vaca. Translated by Adorno, Rolena; Pautz, Patrick Charles. Lincoln, Nebraska: University of Nebraska Press. ISBN 9780803264168.
- Bushnell, Amy Turner (1991). "Thomas Menéndez Márquez: Criolla, Cattleman, and Contador/Tomás Menéndez Márquez: Criolla, Ganadero y Contador Real". In Ann L. Henderson and Gary L. Mormino (ed.). Spanish Pathways in Florida/Caminos Españoles en La Florida. Sarasota, Florida: Pineapple Press. pp. 118–139. ISBN 1-56164-003-4.
- Cook Hale, Jessica W.; Hale, Nathan L.; Garrison, Ervan G. (2018). "What is past is prologue: excavations at the Econfina Channel site, Apalachee Bay, Florida, USA". Southeastern Archaeology – via ResearchGate.
- Cook Hale, Jessica; Benjamin, Jonathan; Woo, Katherine; Astrup, Peter Moe; McCarthy, John; Hale, Nathan; Stankiewicz, Francis; Wiseman, Chelsea; Striver, Claus; Garrison, Ervan; Ulm, Sean; Bailey, Geoff (2021). "Submerged landscapes, marine transgressions and underwater shell middens: Comparative analysis of site formation and taphonomy in Europe and North America" (PDF). Quaternary Science Reviews. 258 (106867): 1–20. Bibcode:2021QSRv..25806867H. doi:10.1016/j.quascirev.2021.106867.
- Davis, Richard A. Jr. (1997). "Geology of the Florida Coast". In Randazzo, Anthony F.; Jones, Douglas S. (eds.). The Geology of Florida. Gainesville, Florida: University Press of Florida. ISBN 0-8130-1496-4.
- Faught, Michael K.; Donoghue, Joseph F. (1997). "Marine Inundated Archaeological Sites Paleofluvial Systems: Examples from a Karst-Controlled Continental Shelf Setting in Apalachee Bay, Northeastern Gulf of Mexico". Geoarchaeology. 12 (5): 418. Bibcode:1997Gearc..12..417F. doi:10.1002/(SICI)1520-6548(199708)12:5<417::AID-GEA1>3.0.CO;2-2. S2CID 13999347.
- Faught, Michael K. (April 2004). "The Underwater Archaeology of Paleolandscapes, Apalachee Bay, Florida" (PDF). American Antiquity. 69 (2): 275–289. doi:10.2307/4128420. JSTOR 4128420.
- Hann, John H. (April 1990). "Summary Guide to Spanish Florida Missions and Visitas with Churches in the Sixteenth and Seventeenth Centuries". The Americas. 46 (4): 417–513. doi:10.2307/1006866. JSTOR 1006866.
- Hann, John H. (2006). The Native American World Beyond Apalachee. University Press of Florida. ISBN 9-780-8130-2982-5.
- Hann, John H.; McEwan, Bonnie G. (1998). The Apalachee Indians and Mission San Luis. University Press of Florida. ISBN 0-8130-1564-2.
- Hernnkind, William F. (March 2013). Sea Life of the Wilderness Coast (PDF) (Report). Tallahassee, Florida: The Florida State University Coastal & Marine Laboratory.
- Mattson, Robert A.; Frazer, Thomas K.; Hale, Jason; Blitch, Seth; Ahijevych, Lisa (2007). "Florida Big Bend" (PDF). In Handley, L.; Altsman, D.; DeMay, R. (eds.). Seagrass Status and Trends in the Northern Gulf of Mexico: 1940–2002. United States Geological Survey. Archived from the original (PDF) on July 9, 2023.
- Milanich, Jerald T. (1994). Archaeology of Precolumbian Florida. Gainesville, Florida: University Press of Florida. ISBN 978-0-8130-1273-5.
- Milanich, Jerald T.; Hudson, Charles (1993). Hernando de Soto and the Indians of Florida. Gainesville, Florida: University Press of Florida. ISBN 9780813011707.
- Raabe, Ellen; Stonehouse, David; Ebersol, Kristin; Holland, Kathryn (September 2011). "Detection of Coastal and Submarine Discharge on the Florida Gulf Coast with an Airborne Thermal-Infrared Mapping System". The Professional Geologist. 48: 42–49 – via ResearchGate.
- Raabe, Ellen; Stumpf, Richard P. (5 May 2015). "Expansion of Tidal Marsh in Response to Sea-Level Rise: Gulf Coast of Florida, USA". Estuaries and Coasts. 39: 145–157. doi:10.1007/s12237-015-9974-y.
- Simpson, J. Clarence (1956). Boyd, Mark F. (ed.). A Provisional Gazetteer of Florida Place-Names of Indian Derivation. Special Publication No. 1. Tallahassee, Florida: Florida Geological Survey.
- Vince, Susan W.; Humphrey, Stephen R.; Simons, Robert W. (September 1989). "The ecology of hydric hammocks: a community profile" (PDF). U.S. Geological Service. Biological Report: 85(7.26). United States Fish and Wildlife Service. Archived from the original (PDF) on December 15, 2018.
