= St. Marks Light =

Lighthouse in Florida, United States

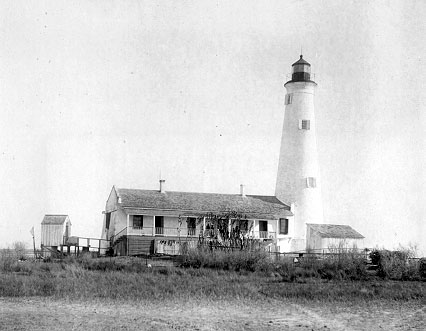
- The St. Marks Light at an unknown date.
- Location: mouth of St. Marks River, on Apalachee Bay, St. Marks, Florida
- Coordinates: 30°04′19″N 84°10′48″W

Tower
- Constructed: 1831
- Foundation: stone
- Construction: brick
- Automated: 1960
- Height: originally 65 feet (20 m), extended to 73 feet (22 m) in 1867, light is 82 feet (25 m) above sea level
- Shape: conical tower
- Heritage: National Register of Historic Places listed place

Light
- First lit: first tower, 1831; second tower, 1842
- Focal height: 25 m (82 ft)
- Lens: fourth order Fresnel lens, replaced by 9.8-inch (250 mm) lens
- Range: 8 nmi (15 km; 9.2 mi)
- Characteristic: white light occulting every 4 s.
- St. Marks Lighthouse
- U.S. National Register of Historic Places
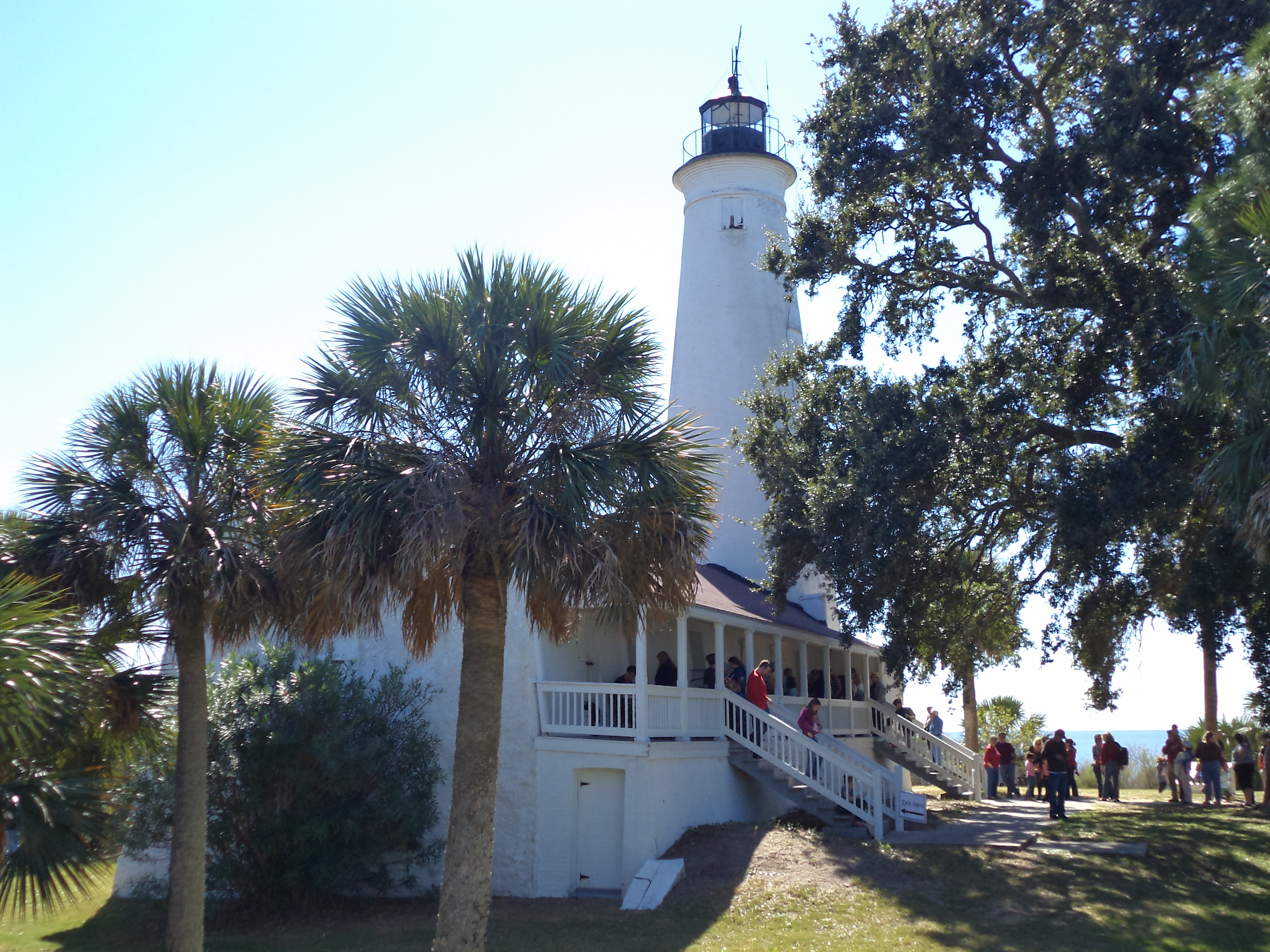
- The lighthouse as it appeared in 2013
- NRHP reference No.: 72000356
- Added to NRHP: July 31, 1972

The St. Marks Light is the second-oldest light station in Florida, United States. It is located on the east side of the mouth of the St. Marks River, on Apalachee Bay.

== Historic background ==
In the 1820s, the town of St. Marks, Florida was considered an important port of entry. The town served as a port for the prosperous planting region of Middle Florida and some counties of South Georgia. Growers hauled their agricultural products down to the port town in wagons by way of an early road which connected the then territorial capital of Tallahassee to the town of St. Marks. Later, this road would be widened and improved upon by the Tallahassee Railroad and would become one of the state's first two railroads.

Once the agricultural products reached the new port town, they were loaded aboard boats for shipment to New Orleans and/or St. Augustine. There were, however, problems in navigating both the Apalachee Bay and the St. Marks River. In many places both bay and river were shallow, and it was not too uncommon for boats to run aground and/or get mired in the muddy shallows. /

== Lighthouse commission ==
In 1828, Florida's territorial Governor William Pope Duval wrote a letter to Joseph M. White, a territorial delegate in which he stressed a great need for a lighthouse at the St. Marks location. White, in turn, wrote a letter to New Hampshire Senator Levi Woodbury, who chaired the Senate Committee on Commerce, reiterating the importance of establishing a light at St. Marks. Eleven days later, the committee issued a report which recognized the town of St. Marks as an official port of entry and recommended the building of a lighthouse in the area. On May 23, 1828, the U.S. House of Representatives passed an act which authorized the construction of a lighthouse at St. Marks and appropriated $6,000 for its construction.

== Construction ==
After a survey was completed of the St. Marks area by Robert Mitchell, the Collector of Customs at Pensacola, and a site chosen for the lighthouse, it was discovered that the initial construction sum of $6,000 would be insufficient. The appropriation was increased to $14,000, and by mid-1829 a contract was signed with Winslow Lewis of Boston for the construction of a tower in the St. Marks area for $11,765. The finished product was not accepted by the Collector of Customs for St. Marks, Mr. Jesse H. Williams, because it had been constructed with hollow walls. Williams felt that the tower should be constructed with solid walls and, therefore, refused to accept the work.

Calvin Knowlton was brought in to rebuild the tower. He oversaw its completion, and in 1831, Williams, satisfied that the light was built according to the contract, accepted the work. That same year saw the tower's whale-oil lamps lit for the first time by Samuel Crosby, who had been appointed the first Keeper of the St. Marks Lighthouse the previous year.

== Threats to the lighthouse ==
=== Second Seminole Indian War ===
Samuel Crosby was still Keeper of the St. Marks Lighthouse in 1835, when the Second Seminole War broke out, and soon learned of the Indian attacks on both the Cape Florida and Mosquito Inlet lighthouses. Fearing for the safety of his family, Crosby wrote authorities and requested that a small detachment of troops be quartered near his lighthouse in order to protect both it and his family against hostile attack. His request was refused. Crosby, still not satisfied with his situation, again wrote authorities and this time requested that a small boat be provided, which he could use to evacuate his family in the event of an emergency. This request was also refused. Fortunately, the Seminole Indians chose not to attack the St. Marks Lighthouse and Crosby continued in his duties as head keeper for another four years.

=== Natural disasters ===
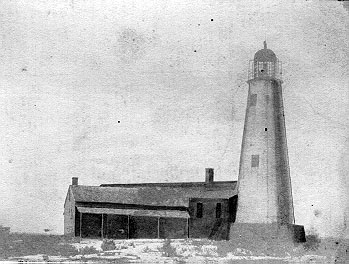
1840 St. Marks Lighthouse U.S. Coast Guard Archive

In 1842, erosion threatened the lighthouse and Winslow Lewis was again called in. He was given a contract to move the tower to a safer location. Lewis's contractors dismantled and removed the lantern and illuminating apparatus, then tore down the original 1829–1831 brick tower. Another site was selected farther inland, away from the water, and a new tower was constructed, then the original lantern and illuminating apparatus were reinstalled.

The new tower survived the destructive hurricanes of the 1840s and 1850s, including the disastrous hurricane of September 1843, which destroyed most of the town of Port Leon and caused major damage to the town of St. Marks.

=== Civil War ===
By the 1860s, however, a new threat to the lighthouse arose: The Civil War. In 1865, Confederate troops were stationed near the lighthouse to defend the area against a Union attack. The tower's lighting apparatus had been removed earlier in order to prevent the lighthouse from aiding ships of the Union blockade, which were patrolling the Apalachee Bay. In March of that year, a Federal fleet of 16 ships appeared off the coast and began to shell the vicinity of the lighthouse in preparation for landing a force. Confederate forces removed the lens and set fire to the interior of the tower and lantern to prevent aiding Union forces.

Though they were unsuccessful in destroying the tower, nevertheless, the damaged inflicted was substantial, necessitating a complete rebuild of the tower immediately following the war. During this subsequent rebuild, the tower was heightened to its present focal plane of 82 feet (25 m) above sea level, and the original lighting apparatus was restored.

== Automation and deactivation ==
The lighthouse was automated by the United States Coast Guard in 1960, and in 2000 the Coast Guard spent $150,000 to stabilize the lighthouse. In 2001 the lighthouse's fourth-order Fresnel lens was deactivated and a modern solar-powered beacon was placed outside the lantern room. The historic Fresnel lens remained in place in the tower for over a decade.

In October 2013 the Coast Guard transferred ownership of the lighthouse to the United States Fish and Wildlife Service, which operates the St. Marks National Wildlife Refuge. The lighthouse was deactivated in 2016 and the Coast Guard's solar beacon was removed. Financial grants from the Florida Department of State and Duke Energy in 2016, plus crowdfunded donations, were put towards repairs and restoration. On October 31, 2019, a replica of the original fourth-order Fresnel lens was lit in the tower. The light is now maintained as a private aid to navigation and is lit seasonally.

== In popular culture ==
The St. Marks Light and the St. Marks National Wildlife Refuge are the settings of Jeff VanderMeer's 2014 horror novel Annihilation and the 2018 horror film of the same name based on the novel. Some exterior shooting was done of the actual lighthouse and the national wildlife refuge for the film, but ultimately the film was not shot there.
