= CSS Spray =

Tugboat

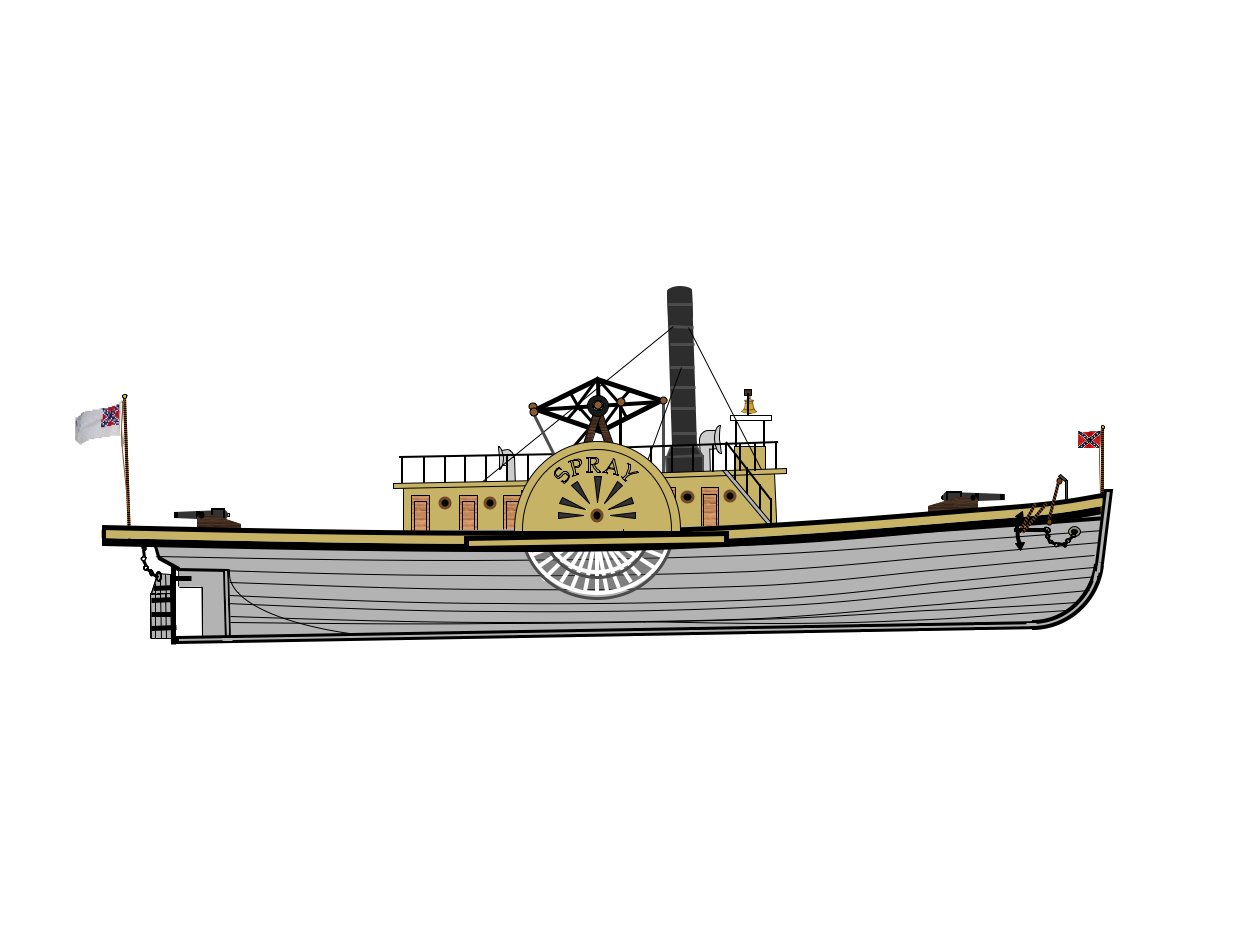
- CSS Spray

History

Confederate States
- Name: Spray
- Laid down: New Albany, Indiana
- Maiden voyage: 1850
- In service: 1863-1865
- Captured: May 12, 1865

General characteristics
- Class & type: Steam gunboat
- Type: Tugboat
- Tonnage: 118
- Draft: 6.5 ft (2.0 m)
- Installed power: 70 h.p.
- Propulsion: 1 high pressure steam boiler, side paddle wheels
- Speed: 12 knots (22 km/h; 14 mph) (cruising)
- Armament: 2 or 3 light cannons

The CSS Spray was a steam-powered, side-paddle wheel tugboat built in New Albany, Indiana originally fitted as a mercantile ship before becoming a gunboat in the Confederate States Navy and used in the St. Marks, Newport, Florida area.

== History ==
=== As the civilian Spray ===
In 1850, Daniel Ladd, a Newport, Florida cotton and general mercantile businessman, purchased the Spray for $15,000. The Spray operated as far south as Cedar Key, Florida, up the Apalachicola River to Columbus, Georgia, up the Suwannee River and west to New Orleans transporting cotton, naval stores, hides, tobacco, beeswax. It first sailed into St. Marks, Florida in 1850.

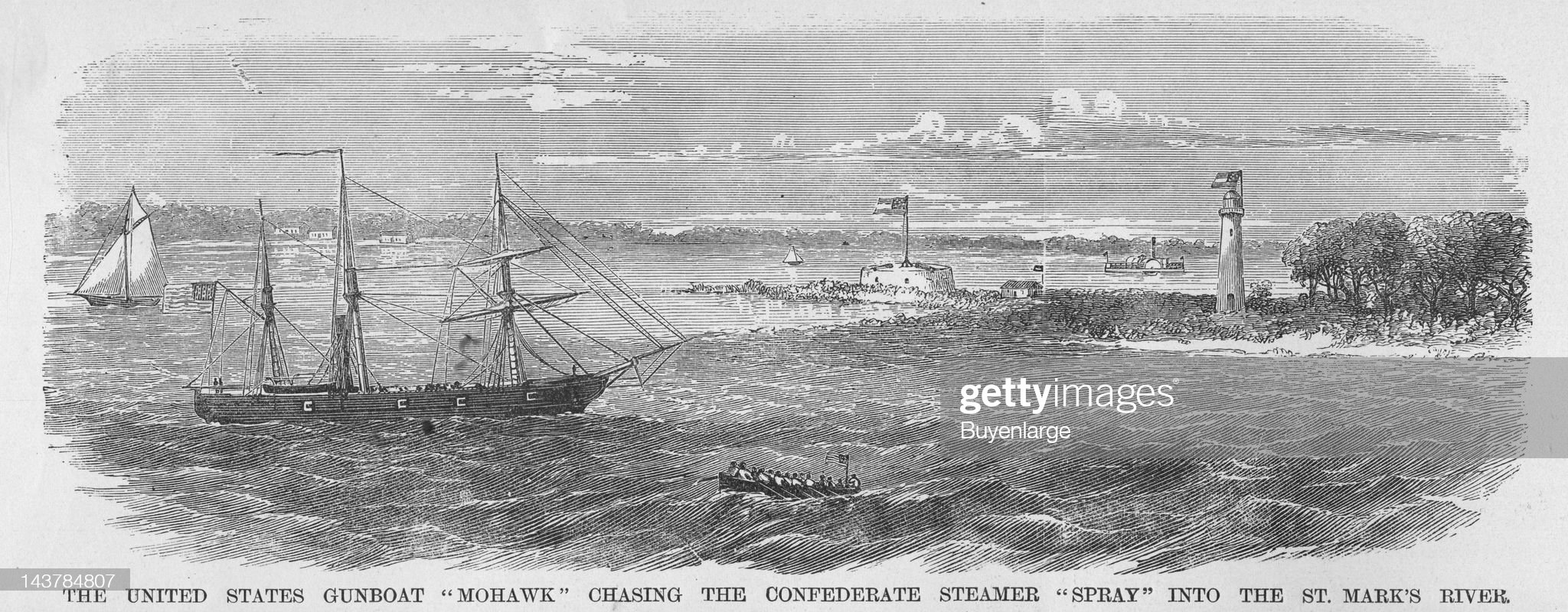
USS Mohawk in chase of CSS Spray into Mark's river.

=== As CSS Spray ===
As a confederate vessel and refitted, the Spray operated in the vicinity of the naval station at St. Marks during 1863–1865, and was the object of much attention by the Federal forces in that vicinity. On September 12, 1863, the captain of the USS Stars and Stripes reported an unsuccessful attack on the Spray up river on the St. Marks River. The CSS Spray was said to be the only Confederate States Navy vessel to operate exclusively in Florida waters.

In February 1864, Federal troops in two naval expeditions of 14 ships landed at St. Marks. Their mission was to capture Tallahassee, Florida, Fort Ward, Port Leon, and burn the nuisance gunboat CSS Spray. The mission failed.

March 6, 1865, the crew of Spray participated in the Battle of Natural Bridge with a complement of 25 men.

The Spray's fate is specious in that it was reported as burned/scuttled by Confederates on St. Marks River in a few accounts and yet survived into the early 20th century by the accounts of the Ladd family.

=== Commanders ===
- Lt. Charles W. Hays, CSN (1863)
- Lt. Henry. L. Lewis, CSN (1864).

Henry Lewis was born in Virginia and appointed to the CSN from Virginia. He was formerly a lieutenant with the U.S. Navy. Lewis also commanded the CSS Rappahannock from 1862 to 1863 before taking command of the Spray in 1864.

== Sources ==
- Gaines, W. Craig, Encyclopedia of Civil War shipwrecks, LSU Press, April 2008, ISBN 978-0-8071-3274-6
