= Daniel Ladd =

Daniel Ladd (March 21, 1817 – October 22, 1872) was born in Augusta, Maine and was an exporter, cotton broker and merchant in early Florida and active as a member of the Secession Convention of Florida.

== Antebellum ==
Ladd came to Florida in 1833 and settled in Magnolia, Florida in what would be Wakulla County, Florida where he worked in his uncle's store. He would later take on the responsibilities of running his uncle's store in Port Leon, Florida. Ladd moved to Newport after the 1843 hurricane.

As Newport grew, Ladd's business grew as well with him adding a large sawmill, foundry, two hotels and turpentine works to the town. He was a major proponent and President of the Georgia-Florida Plank Road Company.

Having a growing business, Ladd purchased a side-paddle wheel steamer in 1850 which was named the Spray. The Spray operated as far south as Cedar Key, Florida, up the Apalachicola River to Columbus, Georgia, up the Suwannee River and west to New Orleans transporting cotton, naval stores, hides, tobacco, beeswax. With his location as well as businesses and transport, Ladd became a mercantile power handling almost all of the merchants and planters for the Red Hills Region and nearby.

== Civil war ==
Upon the outbreak of the American Civil War, Ladd was offered an officer's position in the Confederate Army. He turned down the offer due to his familial connections with Maine. During the war, his Spray became the CSS Spray and was put into duty as a gunboat. The war cost him an estimated loss of $500,000 and after the war, Ladd continued business and did rebuild some of his stores at Newport but not to the degree they had been pre-war.

== Sources ==
- Florida State Univ., Ghost Towns of Selected Florida Gulf Coast Communities
