= Tallahassee Railroad =

Historic railroad in Florida

Overview
- Locale: Northern Florida
- Dates of operation: 1836–1983
- Successor: Seaboard Air Line Railroad; Seaboard Coast Line Railroad

Technical
- Previous gauge: 5 ft (1,524 mm)

The Tallahassee Railroad, headquartered in Tallahassee, Florida, was one of the first two railroads in Florida, starting operations in 1836 or 1837. It did not successfully use steam locomotives until 1855, with trains being pulled by mules for more than 20 years. The principal source of traffic on the railroad for many years was carrying cotton bales from Tallahassee to seaports on the St. Marks River.

== Origin ==
The Red Hills Region of Florida and Georgia and Woodville Karst Plain to the south

Tallahassee sat in "Middle Florida", the part of the Territory of Florida between the Appalachicola and Suwannee rivers. In the 1830s Middle Florida was the most populous and prosperous part of Florida. The heart of Middle Florida and the adjacent part of Georgia formed the "Red Hills Region", which held many plantations producing cotton and tobacco. Export of cotton from the region was difficult. Cotton bales were brought into Tallahassee, from which they were carried in wagons across the deep sand of the Woodville Karst Plain to ports on the St. Marks River. The Legislative Council of the Territory of Florida authorized the Leon Rail-Way Company (Note: Tallahassee is located in Leon County.) in 1831 to build a railroad from Tallahassee to the St. Marks River. When that company failed to organize, the Legislative Council then authorized the Leon Railroad Company, which forfeited its charter after it was unable to raise the required capital.

The Tallahassee Railroad Company was incorporated in 1834 as authorized by an act of the Legislative Council. Richard Keith Call, who owned two plantations in Leon County, became president and chief stockholder of the company. The Territorial government granted 500,000 acres (200,000 ha) of land to the railroad company. As part of the proposed route crossed land still held by the Federal government, Call petitioned the U.S. Congress to grant the railroad a 200-foot (61 m) wide right-of-way, and 100 acres (40 ha) in St. Marks. Congress granted a 60-foot (18 m) wide right of way, and just 20 acres (8.1 ha) at the junction of the St. Marks and Wakulla rivers.

== Construction ==
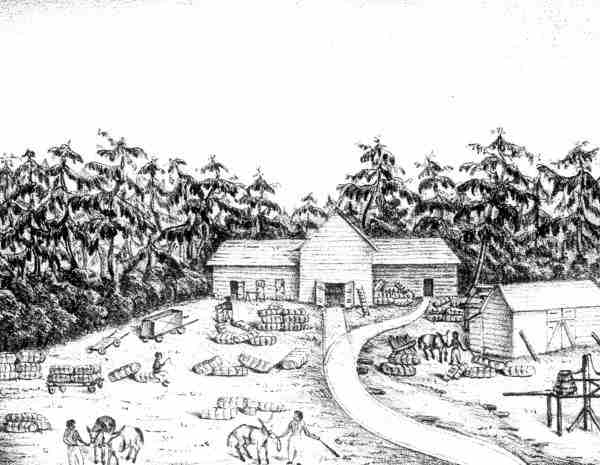
Drawing of the Tallahassee Railroad depot in 1838 by Francis, Comte de Castelnau

Much of what is now known about the construction of the Tallahassee Railroad was recorded by the German Bohemian railroad expert, Franz Anton von Gerstner. Gerstner had been commissioned by the Russian government to write a comprehensive report on railroads in the United States. He visited Middle Florida in 1839.

Construction of the railroad began in 1834 from Tallahassee, and had reached St. Marks, a distance of 22 miles (35 km), by 1836 or 1837 (sources differ on the year operations began). (Note: Some sources state that the Tallahassee Railroad was the first operational railroad in Florida. The Lake Wimico and St. Joseph Railroad began operations in March, 1836.) By 1839, the railroad was extended two miles (3.2 km) south to Port Leon by means of a drawbridge across the St. Marks River. The line was constructed using strap rail (eight-foot (2.4 m) long timbers with a one-half-inch (13 mm) thick strap of iron on top), using a track gauge (distance between rails) of five feet (1,524 mm) laid on ties spaced at intervals of six to seven feet (1.8 to 2.1 m). Most of the route was over very flat, forested land. Drainage was poor, and rain often washed the sand from under the tracks, throwing them out of alignment. This left the track in poor condition, with high maintenance costs. (A traveler on the railroad in 1855 reported being told that the rails had initially been laid directly on the sand without ties to hold the rails in alignment.)

The French naturalist, Francis de Laporte de Castelnau, visited Middle Florida from November 1837 until March 1838. While admitting that the railroad was "very useful" because of the near impossibility of transporting cotton by horse-drawn wagon across the sandy soil from Tallahassee to the St. Marks River, he called the railroad "the very worst that has yet been built in the entire world", with such poor construction that it had proven impossible to operate locomotives on the track.

== Port Leon ==
The initial terminal for the railroad was St. Marks. The Federal government had only granted 20 acres (8.1 ha) at St. Marks to the railroad, instead of the 100 acres (40 ha) it had requested. The land grant from the Territory of Florida included a larger area across (to the east of) the St. Marks River and a little nearer to the mouth of the river. Siting the terminal of the railroad on the territorial grant land gave the company more room for its terminal facilities, and full control of the transfer of goods between the railroad and ships. Starting in 1838, the railroad company laid out and sold lots in Port Leon. The residents of Magnolia, a port town up the St. Marks River from the port of St. Marks, which had been bypassed by the railroad, moved en masse to Port Leon. The railroad reached Port Leon in 1839. The town had quickly grown to a population of about 450, and was incorporated in 1841. Yellow fever struck the town in 1841, killing 139 residents. About 200 residents were still in Port Leon in early 1843 when it was made the county seat of Wakulla County, which was newly created out of Leon County.

When it began selling lots at Port Leon, the railroad company had claimed that site was the highest on Apalachee Bay, above the highest tides. The Apalachee Bay Storm of 1837 apparently had not seriously flooded the site. The Port Leon, Florida Hurricane of 1843 struck Port Leon in September of that year. The hurricane was accompanied by a storm surge of 7 to 10 feet (2.1 to 3.0 m). While only one person was killed, every structure in the town was destroyed or severely damaged. The bridge across the St. Marks River was carried upstream past the town of St. Marks. The town of St. Marks also suffered damage from the storm. Many residents of Port Leon moved to a new town north of St. Marks, Newport. The railroad company quickly repaired its line into St. Marks, and made it the new shipping terminal for the line. Port Leon then faded away.

== Operations ==
Trains on the railroad were pulled by horses or mules for many years. The company had purchased two locomotives (the Tallahassee Floridan reported the purchase of one locomotive in December, 1837), but could not use them because of the poor condition of the track. As of 1839, besides the two unused locomotives, the railroad owned three passenger cars (the first of which could hold only eight passengers), 45 freight cars, 35 horses and mules, and 23 slaves. The railroad also owned a sawmill, 4,000 acres (1,600 ha) of woodlands, a 1,000-acre (400 ha) plantation for raising fodder for the horses and mules, and the town of Port Leon. Slaves performed most of the work on the railroad and the plantation.

Daily passenger service in each direction was provided with a single car pulled by two horses. The horses were changed at the half-way mark, and the one-way trip took two-and-a-half hours at a speed of about 9 miles per hour (14 km/h). Passenger fare was $1.50 per passenger, and some 4,000 passengers were carried in 1838. Freight trains of five to eight cars also ran in each direction once a day. The freight trains were pulled by six horses or mules at a speed of 2.5 miles per hour (4.0 km/h). Most of the freight carried from Tallahassee to the seaports was cotton, about 14,000 bales of cotton (a bale weighed 400 to 500 pounds (180 to 230 kg)) out of 8,000 short tons (7,300 t) carried in 1838. About 5,000 short tons (4,500 t) of goods were carried from the seaports to Tallahassee that year. The freight charge for a bale of cotton was 75 cents.

The condition of the railroad remained poor throughout the almost 20 years that the original owners of the Tallahassee Railroad operated the line. A traveler who was a passenger on the railroad in 1855 was unhappy with his journey. He noted that rails and ties were sometimes missing, and that the iron straps on the rails were sometimes fastened only in the middle, so that both ends of the strap curled up. At one point a forest fire had set the ties on fire for a distance of two miles (3.2 km), which the train nevertheless proceeded across. When the slave driving the train was asked why he did not try to fight the fire, he replied that he was not a fireman. The passenger train was delayed because a freight train had derailed, and the passengers had to help place the freight cars on the track again. As there was no way for the passenger train to pass the freight train, it was further delayed by the slow speed at which the freight train moved. The traveler noted that delays of this sort occurred almost every day.

== New owners ==
In 1855, Richard Keith Call sold his majority interest in the Tallahassee Railroad to the Pensacola and Georgia Railroad. The following year, the line was completely rebuilt, with iron rails replacing the wood rails, and the introduction of two Baldwin 4-4-0 steam locomotives. In 1857, the president of the Pensacola and Georgia Railroad declared that the Tallahassee Railroad was "one of the best paying roads in the country".

== Battle of Natural Bridge ==
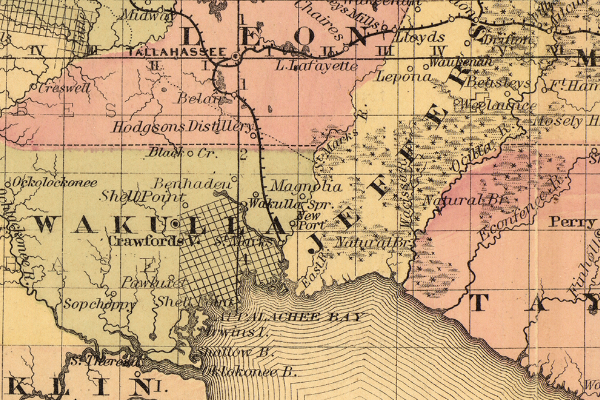
Map of the Tallahassee Railroad in 1868

The Union Army and Navy mounted a raid on the area around St. Marks in March 1865 as part of an attempt to cut off peninsular Florida from the rest of the Confederacy. Seamen and soldiers were landed at various points on Apalachee Bay in an attempt to capture or burn bridges over the Aucilla ("Ocilla" on the map), East, Ochlockonee ("Okloknee" on the map), and St. Marks rivers, to seize the towns of Newport and St. Marks, and to destroy the Tallahassee Railroad. The main force under Brigadier General John Newton arrived at Newport to find that the bridge across the St. Marks River had been burned. General Newton decided to cross the St. Marks on the natural bridge (where the river went briefly underground) a few miles upstream from Newport. News of the Federal landings at St. Marks had reached Tallahassee the night of March 4. Various Confederate troops were dispatched to bolster the defence of the area. Confederate reinforcements, including elements of the Second Florida Cavalry, militia from Leon and Gadsden counties, and cadets from the West Florida Seminary, traveled down the Tallahassee Railroad the night of March 5 and into March 6, detraining at Hodgsons (turpentine) distillery, in the vicinity of what is now Woodville, as that was closer to the natural bridge than Newport. Newton's forces reached the natural bridge on March 6, only to find it defended by Confederate troops. Confederate forces held the crossing in the Battle of Natural Bridge, and the Federal troops withdrew.

== Mergers ==
In March, 1867, George William Swepson, in a fraudulent transaction, purchased the Pensacola and Georgia Railroad for $1,220,000, and the Tallahassee Railroad for $195,000. The two railroads were then merged into a new company, called the Tallahassee Railroad. That company was in turn incorporated into the Jacksonville, Pensacola and Mobile Railroad, which was created in 1869. Edward Reed purchased the Jacksonville, Pensacola and Mobile Railroad and, in 1882, merged it into the Florida Central and Western Railroad. The Florida Central and Western Railroad was in turned merged into the Florida Railway and Navigation Company in 1884, which was re-incorporated as the Florida Central and Peninsular Railroad in 1888, and again, in 1893, as the Florida Central and Peninsular Railway. The Seaboard Air Line Railway leased the Florida Central and Peninsular Railway in 1900, and purchased it in 1903. The Tallahassee to St. Marks line would be known as the Wakulla Subdivision under the Seaboard Air Line and its successors.

== Abandonment ==
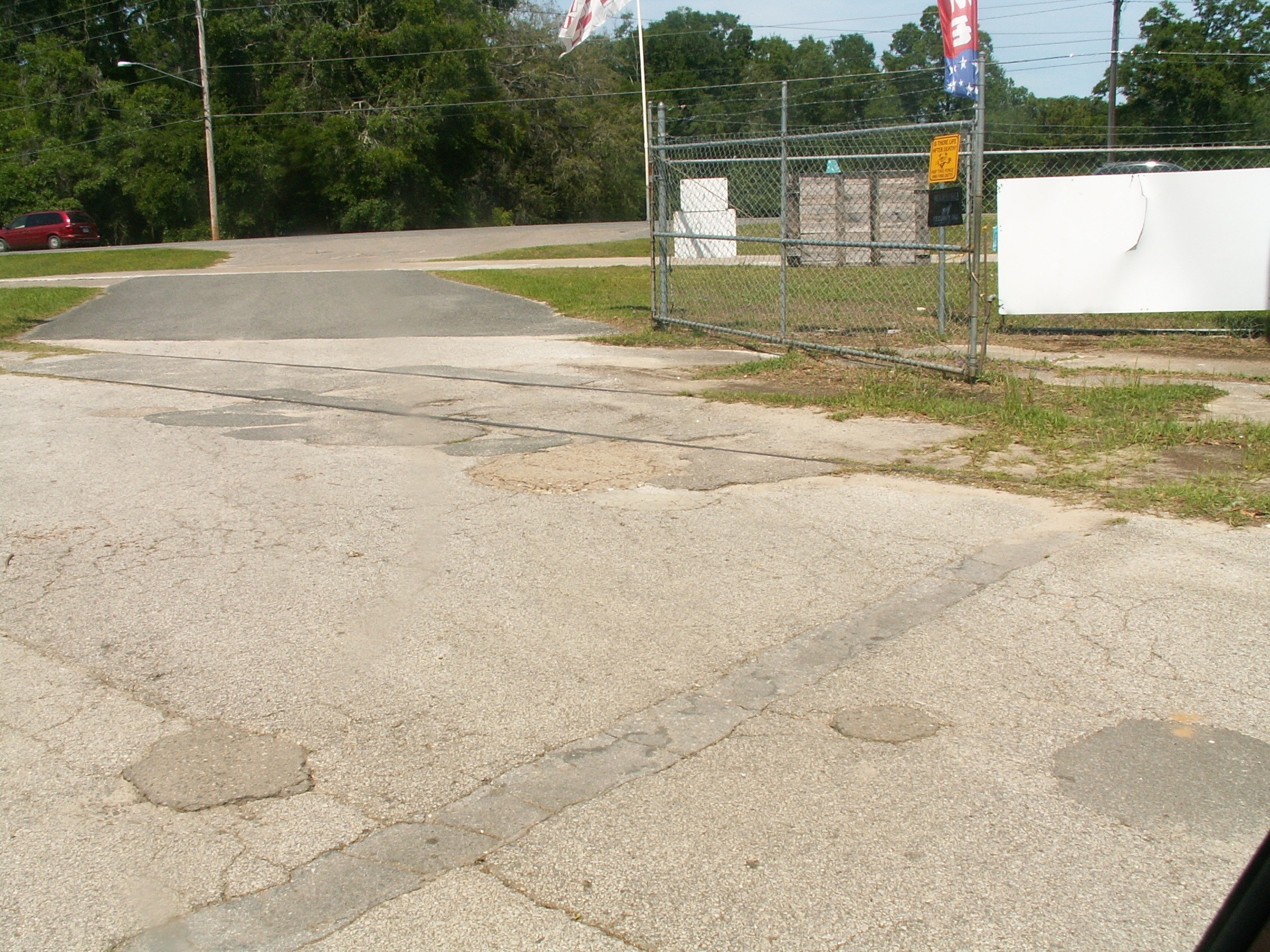
The last remaining rails of the Tallahassee Railroad in a parking lot in southern Tallahassee

The Seaboard Air Line Railway (SAL) had ceased operating over the last two miles (3.2 km) of the St. Marks branch (the old Tallahassee Railroad) leading into St. Marks in 1932. A petition by the SAL to resume service to those two miles (3.2 km) to the end of the line in St. Marks was approved by the Interstate Commerce Commission in 1939. The St. Marks branch remained in use through the 1960s. The line was officially abandoned by the Seaboard Coast Line Railroad (SAL's successor) in 1983, and the State of Florida purchased the abandoned right-of-way in 1984. Sixteen miles (26 km) of that right-of-way has since become the Tallahassee-St. Marks Historic Railroad State Trail

== Historic Stations ==
Milepost	City/Location	Station	Connections and notes
SPA 799.3	Tallahassee	Tallahassee	junction with: Pensacola and Georgia Railroad (FC&P/SAL); Carrabelle, Tallahassee & Georgia Railroad (GF&A/SAL)
SPA 802.2	Tallahassee	St. Marks Junction	
SPA 803.3		Belair	
SPA 805.6		Lutterloh	
SPA 808.2		Rhodes	
SPA 808.8	Woodville	Woodville	
SPA 809.4		Moody	
SPA 811.3		Burnt Mill	
SPA 812.1		Vereen	
SPA 814.5		Wakulla	
SPA 815.7		Burns	
SPA 817.5	Newport	Newport	
SPA 820.2	St. Marks	St. Marks	

== Sources ==
- Fenlon, Paul E. (April 1954). "The Notorious Swepson-Littlefield Fraud: Railroad Financing in Florida, 1868–1871". The Florida Historical Quarterly. 32 (4): 231–261. JSTOR 30139716.
- Pettengill, George W. Jr. (1998) [1952]. "The Story of the Florida Railroads: 1834–1903". The Railway and Locomotive Historical Society Bulletin. Bulletin. 86 (86) (Reprint ed.). Boston: The Railway and Locomotive Historical Society. JSTOR 43517668.
- Turner, Gregg M. (2008). A Journey into Florida Railroad History. Gainesville, Florida: University Press of Florida. ISBN 978-0-8130-4194-0.
