= Walkatomica =

Steam boat in St.Marks, Florida from (1885-1898)

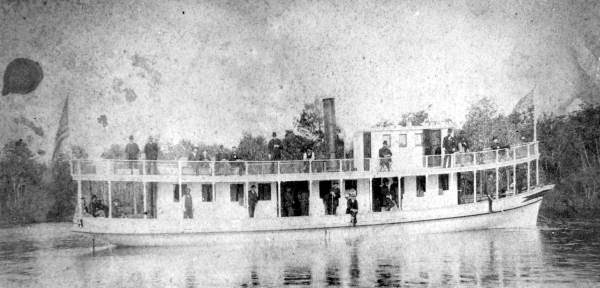
Walkatomica loaded with passengers running on the waterway

Walkatomica was a steam boat that operated from 1885-1898 around St. Marks, Florida.

The steam boat was built in Tallahassee by Capt. William P. Slusser. Its construction commenced in late January and February 1885. It was inspected on June 13, 1885 and put on flat cars of the Florida Railway & Navigation Co. for the 3½ hour trip to the coast. It was then launched on June 18, 1885.

The steam boat met the train from Tallahassee to St. Marks and made regular runs to Newport, Wakulla County, Carrabelle and St. Teresa. Cost for a round trip ticket for train and steamer was $2.25.

It burned during a fire on October 4, 1898.
