= Tallahassee–St. Marks Historic Railroad State Trail =

State park in Florida, United States

- Tallahassee-St. Marks Trail sign

- Location within Florida Location within the United States
- Interactive map of Tallahassee–St. Marks Historic Railroad State Trail
- Location: Leon County, Florida, United States
- Nearest city: Tallahassee, Florida
- Coordinates: 30°24′00″N 84°16′52″W
- Governing body: Florida Department of Environmental Protection

The Tallahassee–St. Marks Historic Railroad State Trail is a rail trail and Florida State Park located on 16 miles (26 km) of the historic railbed of the Tallahassee Railroad, which ran between Tallahassee and St. Marks, Florida. The trail ends near the confluence of the St. Marks and Wakulla Rivers. The portion of the trail south of US 98 is designated as a portion of the Florida National Scenic Trail. A paved extension of the trail extends north for approximately 4 miles (6.4 km) into the City of Tallahassee.

== Recreational activities ==
Activities include bicycling, skating, walking, jogging, and horseback riding. Amenities include a paved surface for those on foot or wheels and an unpaved trail for those on horseback. Parking is available at the trail head on SR 363/Woodville Hwy., just south of Tallahassee, as well as at the J. Lewis Hall Park in Woodville, the Wakulla Station Trailhead in Wakulla County, and the city park at the end of the trail in St. Marks.

Parks and recreational areas adjacent to the trail include the Munson Hills Off-Road Bicycle Trail system, which is accessible from the Tallahassee-St. Marks Historic Railroad State Trail parking area via the Paper Cup Trail spur, as well as from the Trail Access spur 1.25 miles (2.01 km) south of the main trail head off SR 363. J. Lewis Hall Park in Woodville, accessible 2.5 miles (4.0 km) south of the main trail head off SR 363; the Wakulla Station Trailhead, accessible 9 miles (14 km) south of the main trail head (and 6.5 miles (10.5 km) north of St. Marks) off SR 363; and the San Marcos de Apalache Historic State Park, located at the end of the trail in St. Marks. The Munson Hills Trails are popular with off-road bicyclists and have recently been expanded to 21 miles (34 km) in length between two main (Munson Hills and Twilight) trails. J. Lewis Hall Park hosts numerous youth baseball games, among other events. An "adaptable playground" designed for special needs children has recently been installed at the Wakulla Station Trailhead.

Starting in late 2009, according to Florida Greenways and Trails, the trail was completely resurfaced and widened to 12' in width. The portion of the trail south of the Wakulla Trailhead was reconstructed first, while the portion north of the Wakulla Trailhead was reconstructed after work was completed on the southern end of the trail. In conjunction with the trail construction, a new trailhead was built in the city of St. Marks near the current trail terminus. Construction was completed in early 2011.

== Special events ==
The annual Tallahassee Marathon utilizes all of the City of Tallahassee portion and the northern six miles (10 km) of the State of Florida portion of the St. Marks Trail.

== Hours ==
Florida state parks are open between 8 a.m. and sundown every day of the year (including holidays).

== References and external links ==
- Tallahassee-St. Marks Historic Railroad State Trail at Florida Department of Environmental Protection
- Tallahassee-St. Marks Historic Railroad State Trail at Absolutely Florida
- Tallahassee-St. Marks Historic Railroad State Trail at Wildernet
- Tallahassee-St. Marks Historic Railroad State Trail at 100 Florida Trails
