= St. Marks National Wildlife Refuge =

United States National Wildlife Refuge in Florida

- IUCN category IV (habitat/species management area)
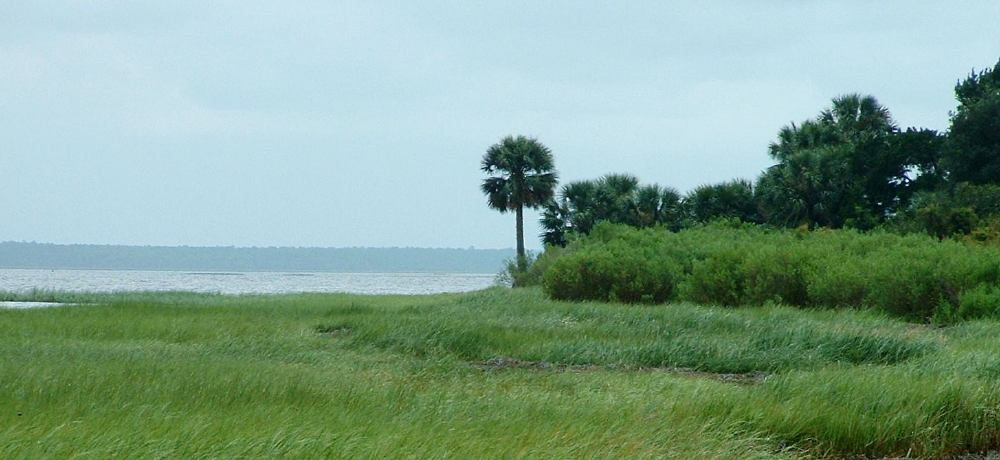
- St. Marks National Wildlife Refuge shoreline near Lighthouse

- Location within the United States
- Location: Wakulla County, Jefferson County, Taylor County, Florida, United States
- Nearest city: St. Marks, Florida
- Coordinates: 30°09′03″N 84°08′50″W
- Area: 83,000 acres (340 km^{2})
- Established: 1931
- Governing body: U.S. Fish and Wildlife Service

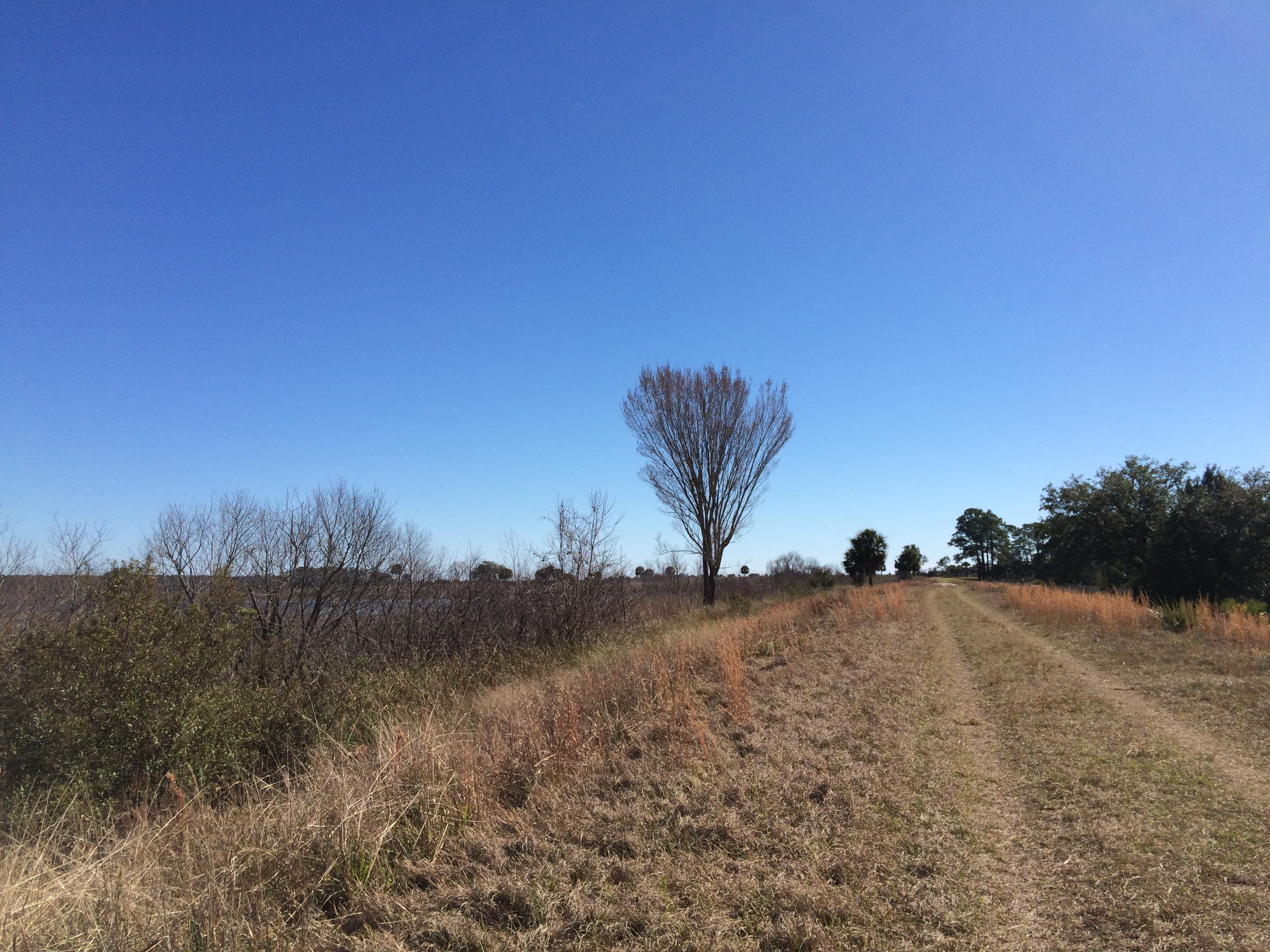
Biking/cycling trail

St. Marks National Wildlife Refuge is a wintering ground for migratory birds in Florida. Established in 1931, it encompasses more than 83,000 acres (340 km^{2}) spread between Wakulla, Jefferson, and Taylor Counties in the state of Florida.

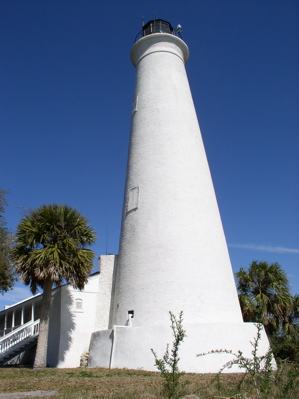
St. Marks Lighthouse

The refuge includes several Gulf of Mexico coastal habitats, such as saltwater marshes, islands, tidal creeks, and the estuaries of several north Florida rivers. It is home to a diverse range of plants, animal life and structures such as the St. Marks Lighthouse.

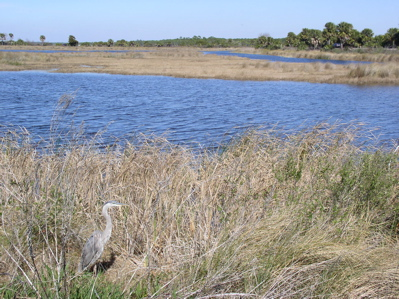
Heron at St. Marks National Wildlife Refuge

The refuge is inhabited by black bears, bobcats, otters, raccoons, foxes, coyotes, amphibians, alligators, snakes, freshwater and saltwater fish, as well as many different species of birds, including wading birds, waterfowl, and raptors.

The St. Marks Refuge Association's friends' group and the photography club supply the majority of volunteers for the St. Marks National Wildlife Refuge.

From 2009-2016, St. Marks NWR served as a winter home for young, endangered whooping cranes. These captive-hatched cranes were taught to follow an ultra light aircraft piloted by costumed Operation Migration pilots on a journey of more than 1,200 miles (1,900 km) from central Wisconsin to Florida. The refuge is also a stopping point for the yearly monarch butterfly migration. The festival is hosted annually to educate people on the practice of tagging monarch butterflies as they continue through their migration.

== Wilderness ==
Designated in 1975 by the U.S. Congress as part of the National Wilderness Preservation System, the St. Marks Wilderness makes up 17,350 acres of the refuge. The Florida National Scenic Trail traverses the refuge for 41 miles (66 km), including a portion of the wilderness area.

== Access ==
Public access points to the refuge are located at:

- Panacea Unit

Otter Lake, in Panacea
Bottoms Road, in Panacea
Skipper Bay Road, south of Medart
Purify Bay Road, in Medart

- Wakulla Unit

Shell Point Highway, north of Shell Point
Wakulla Beach Road, east of Shell Point

- Newport Unit and St. Marks Unit

Lighthouse Road, the main entrance, in Newport

- Aucilla Unit

Mandalay Bay Road, just east of the Aucilla River in Taylor County.

There is no paved public access to the refuge in Jefferson County.

== In popular culture ==
The St. Marks National Wildlife Refuge and the St. Marks Light lighthouse are the settings of Jeff VanderMeer's 2014 horror novel Annihilation and the 2018 horror film of the same name based on the novel. Some exterior shooting was done of the national wildlife refuge and the lighthouse for the film, but ultimately the film was not shot there.

== Gallery ==
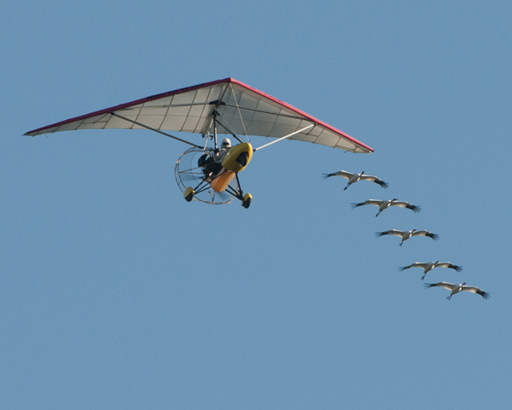
Endangered whooping cranes fly over, December 2010

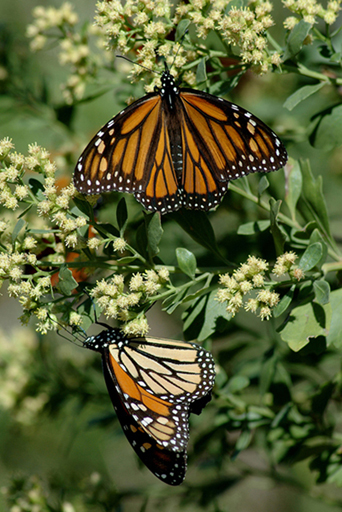
Monarch butterflies resting during migration

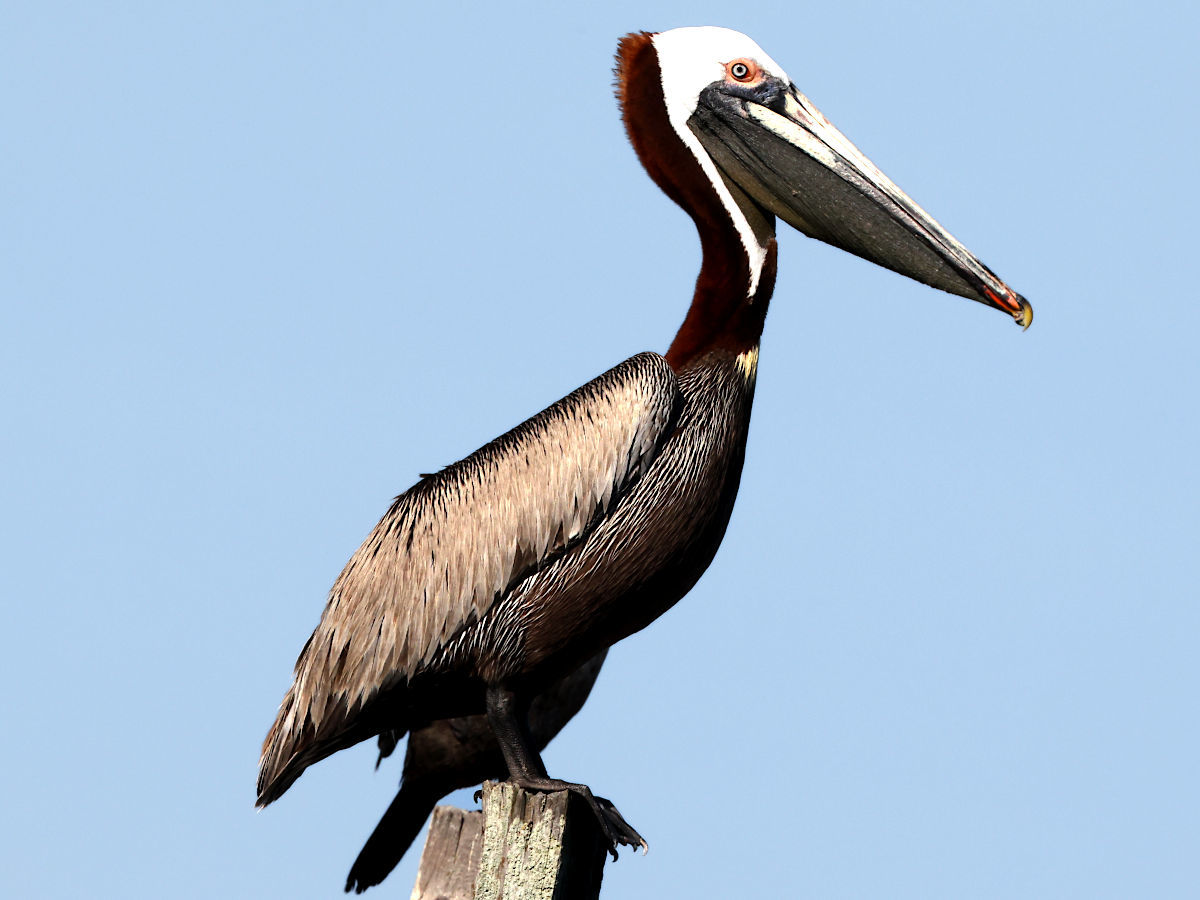
Brown pelican near the lighthouse

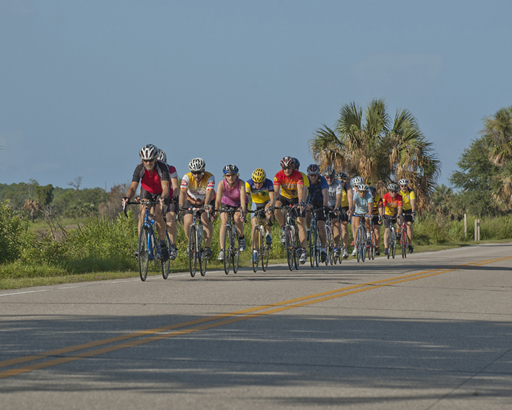
Large biking group on Lighthouse Road

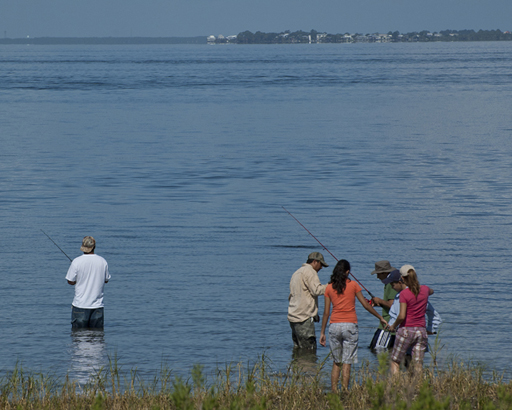
Six wading fishers
