= Magnolia, Florida =

Magnolia
- Former town
- Location within Florida
- Coordinates: 30°13′15″N 84°10′30″W
- Country: United States
- State: Florida
- County: Wakulla County
- Established: 1820s

Magnolia, Florida was a thriving river port town in southern Wakulla County, Florida (until 1843, Leon County, Florida), established in the 1820s and is classified as an "extinct city" by the State Library and Archives of Florida. All that remains of the city is the cemetery; the last known burial was in 1883 James French a C.S.A. private that was born in Magnolia town in 1843. The cemetery is on land now owned by the St. Joe Paper Company. The town was located near the small city of St. Marks, Florida.

== History ==
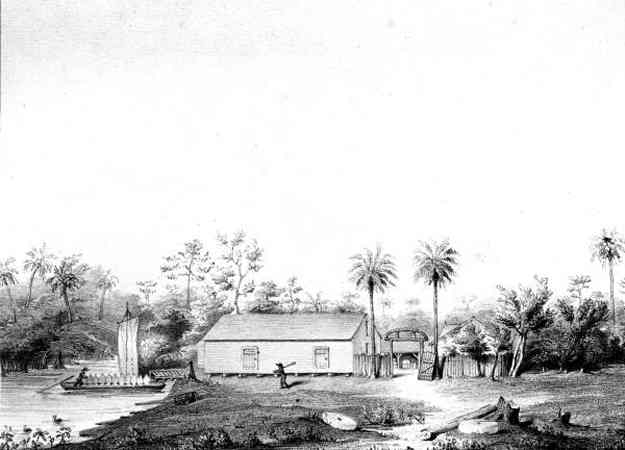
Drawing of Magnolia, Florida (1842)

=== Establishment ===
In June 1827, only 6 years after Spain ceded Florida to the United States, four brothers from Maine, John, George, Nathaniel and Weld Hamlin founded the town of Magnolia on the St. Marks river just north of the existing town of St. Marks. The Ladd family also married into the Hamlin family and helped settle the new town of Magnolia. Their primary purpose was to establish a profitable shipping port for the export of cotton that would be delivered to the port from points north, primarily from the rail terminus in Tallahassee about 20 miles north. The Hamlins had relatives in Maine who owned and operated a large textile mill.

=== Growth and business ===
The town experienced initial growth as lots were platted and sold. Several stores, warehouses and a hotel that billed itself as the "best on the gulf" were established.

Imports also came through the port to supply the growing Florida panhandle area. Such items of record include brown and loaf sugar, Canary, Málaga and Bordeaux wine (known then as Claret wine), bleached osnaburg, powder, shot, lead, cordage, leans soup, foolscap sealing wax and Scotch snuff.

Although a crude road made of dirt and wooden boards was constructed to run from this area to Tallahassee, a railroad was needed (In the early 1850s an upgraded plank road was constructed). By 1835 a rail connection was launched from Tallahassee to the town of St. Marks situated a little farther south on the St. Marks river. The rail effectively by-passed Magnolia. Although the rail line was crude and initially relied on mules to pull open cars along loosely anchored rails, this connection gave St. Marks a transportation advantage over Magnolia.

By the late 1830s, the fate of Magnolia was sealed and most of the inhabitants picked up and moved either to St. Marks or to the new town of Port Leon south of St. Marks. Some of the buildings were moved along with the people. Port Leon later suffered a devastating hurricane that destroyed the town and caused its inhabitants to move back up closer to the original town of Magnolia and settle the town of Newport.

In 1829 a US customs house was established at Magnolia. Magnolia, St. Marks, and sister river port town Port Leon, thrived from the commerce from Tallahassee merchants and cotton plantations of the Red Hills Region of north Florida and south Georgia when their products were hauled south to Tallahassee and beyond. These products were shipped to the port via wagon trains and the 24-mile-long Tallahassee Railroad. From that point, steamboats and sailing schooners then picked up these items at the port and transported them to other ports. As Magnolia waned and St. Marks thrived, the US Customs House was transferred to St. Marks in the 1830s.

Maps show six named streets running northeast to southwest and five named streets running northwest to southeast with 34 blocks containing lots, homes, or businesses.

On September 13, 1843, a dangerous hurricane hit the area with a 10-foot storm surge, severely damaging what was left of Magnolia as well as destroying nearby Port Leon and damaging St. Marks.

There was another town named Magnolia that existed around the time of the American Civil War in Clay County, Florida, on the west bank of the St. Johns River. Period maps place this town just north of present-day Green Cove Springs, Florida. (Some maps (Atlas To Accompany The Official records of the Union and Confederate Armies) name the location as "Magnolia Hotel & Steam Mill," but it appears in dispatches as Magnolia.)

=== Mayors, Councilmen, & Officials ===
[unknown]

=== U.S. Postmasters of Magnolia ===
1831 - Edward Sexias (see Floridian, 24-Oct-1831, p2)

== Photo gallery ==
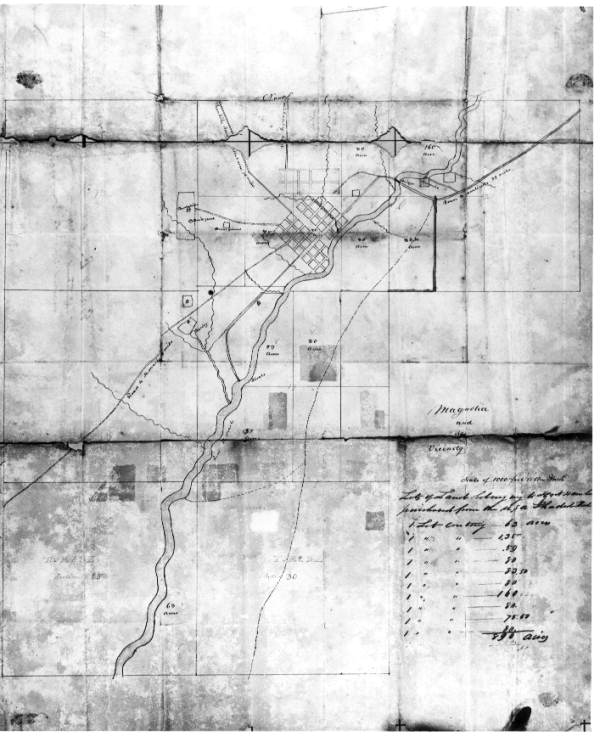
Old map shows location of Magnolia

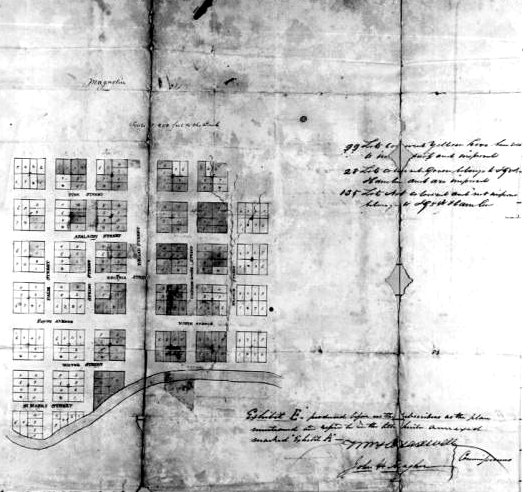
Old map with close view of Magnolia's streets

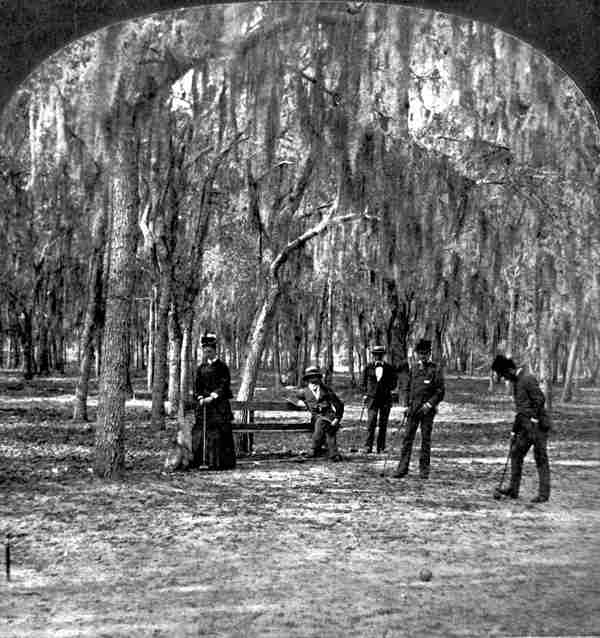
People enjoying croquet in an oak grove in Magnolia

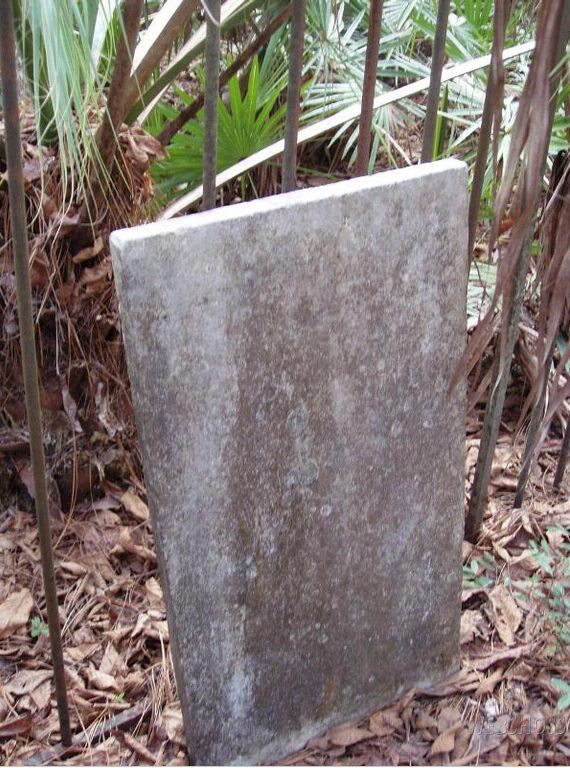
Cemetery headstone worn by age

Magnolia was large enough that the US Government permitted the Bank at Magnolia to issue its own Currency from 1832 through 1838.

== See also ==
- List of ghost towns in Florida

== Sources ==
- St. Marks River History

== Other reading ==
- The Ladd Family History
