= Florida and Georgia Plank Road Company =

The Florida and Georgia Plank Road Company was one of five such plank road companies incorporated by the Florida legislature in 1850, but was the only one built. (The Jacksonville and Alligator Plank Road Company, incorporated 1851, only constructed part of its route, now Old Plank Road near Jacksonville.) Joseph and Green Chaires, cotton plantation owners, were granted a charter for the company. The original plan was for the road to start near Newport, Florida and run to near Thomasville, Georgia with spurs to Tallahassee, Monticello and Quincy.

By 1852, the plank road was completed to Old St. Augustine Road and the spur to Tallahassee was completed by 1855. The Plank Road intersected Old St. Augustine Road and it was near that intersection that during the Civil War, Captain Patrick Houston's father, Edward Houston, built the small "Old Fort" with earthworks still to be seen in a small city park in the Woodland Hills subdivision.

The Plank Road was used into the 1890s, but eventually became disused. Although the "Old Fort" or Fort Houston was built during the Civil War and is associated with the Battle of Natural Bridge, Captain Houston and his Kilcrease Light Artillery were nowhere near there during that battle. Rather his artillery was positioned near the center of the Confederate line at the Battle of Natural Bridge.
