= Port Leon, Florida =

Former human settlement in Florida, USA

Coordinates: 30°07′52″N 84°11′42″W

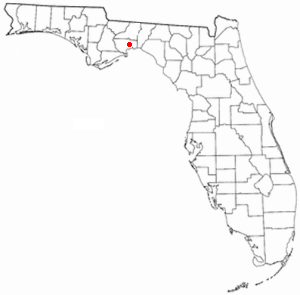
Location of Port Leon

Government docks at Port Leon

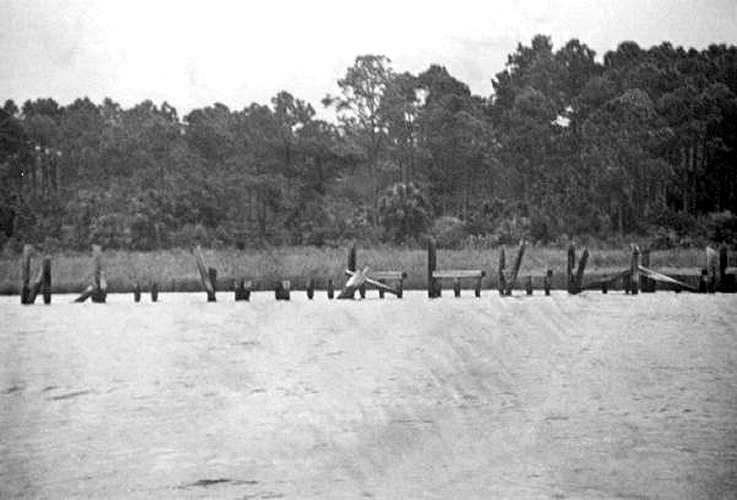
Government docks at Port Leon

Port Leon, Florida, was a river port town located in what is now Wakulla County, Florida (at the time, it was part of Leon County, Florida). The town existed for only about six years in the first half of the 19th century. Port Leon is classified as an "extinct city" by the State Library and Archives of Florida, and only remnants can be found today.

Port Leon was established in 1837, largely by former inhabitants of Magnolia. It was located approximately 3 miles (4.8 km) south of St. Marks on the east bank of the St. Marks River. Similar to its neighboring towns of St. Marks and Magnolia, Port Leon served as an important port for the cotton plantations in the Red Hills Region of Florida and Georgia.

The Tallahassee Railroad reached Port Leon in 1839. By that time, both freight wagons and the railroad were transporting approximately 30,000 to 40,000 bales of cotton annually to the area ports. A bridge across the St. Marks River connected the port to the railroad, facilitating the loading of cotton onto ships bound for the east coast of the United States.

Port Leon received a post office in 1840, and was incorporated in 1841. In the same year Port Leon, along with the other communities in the area, endured a severe yellow fever epidemic. On March 11, 1843, it was chosen as the seat of newly created Wakulla County. On September 13, 1843, a strong hurricane with a 10-foot (3 m) storm surge hit the area and destroyed Port Leon as well as heavily damaging nearby Magnolia and St. Marks. Port Leon was abandoned and many of its residents moved inland to the new town of Newport.

Port Leon had several hundred citizens at its peak with 8 to 10 businesses, some wharves, warehouses, a hotel, two taverns, a newspaper and an annual fair. One of the successful citizens was Daniel Ladd who had married into the Hamlin family from Maine that established the town of Magnolia.

== See also ==
- List of ghost towns in Florida

== Sources ==
- Port Leon - Ghost Town – accessed February 9, 2008
