= 1840s Atlantic hurricane seasons =

This article encompasses the 1840–1849 Atlantic hurricane seasons. While data is not available for every storm that occurred, some parts of the coastline were populated enough to give data of hurricane occurrences. Each season was an ongoing event in the annual cycle of tropical cyclone formation in the Atlantic basin. Most tropical cyclone formation occurs between June 1 and November 30.

== 1840 Atlantic hurricane season ==
=== Tropical Storm One ===
June 19–23. In the middle of June, a tropical storm passed west of Lake Charles, Louisiana, accompanied by several days of heavy rain. Strong winds on June 21 damaged corn crops.

=== Tropical Storm Two ===
September 17–18 A tropical storm struck Galveston, Texas.

=== Tropical Storm Three ===
On an unspecified date in 1840, a hurricane reportedly caused severe flooding that destroyed entire villages at the mouth of the Rio Grande. Unclear whether these events are related to prior storm that struck Galveston.

== 1841 Atlantic hurricane season ==
=== Tropical Storm One ===
August 23–24. A tropical storm was reported off the southern U.S. Atlantic coast.

=== Hurricane Two ===
The Late Gale at St. Joseph. September 7–16. A strong tropical storm hit Barbados in early September, then traveled to the Florida Panhandle on September 14 and 15, and continued on to South Carolina.

=== Hurricane Three ===
September 25–27. A hurricane was reported off the Cape Hatteras coast that later traveled to Nova Scotia.

=== Hurricane Four ===
The October Gale of 1841. September 25-October 4. The hurricane was first reported near Barbados and later became an intense hurricane that remained offshore of the Carolinas in early October. It moved northeastward, entraining cold air into its circulation. It became an extratropical storm, and hit New England on October 3. It led to a storm of snow and sleet in Connecticut, bringing drifts of up to 18 feet (5.5 m) of snow in some areas. The storm wrecked the Georges Bank fishing fleet which drowned 81 fishermen and knocked down trees, tore roofs off houses and forced boats to go up on shore. The storm also destroyed a saltworks factory along Cape Cod, sending the economy to a slump. In 1842, a monument was erected to remember the sailors and fishermen lost at sea to the "October Gale" of 1841.

=== Hurricane Five ===
The Key West Hurricane of 1841. October 18–21. In October, a hurricane hit Cuba, crossing near Havana. After crossing the island, it passed by the Florida Keys on October 18 and 19. The hurricane eroded part of Key West, destroyed the keeper's house at Sand Key Light, and damaged the seawall and later headed towards Bermuda. Wrecked many ships in Lower Keys.

== 1842 Atlantic hurricane season ==
The 1842 Atlantic hurricane season featured several maritime catastrophes in the Gulf of Mexico and along the U.S. East Coast, and produced one of the only known tropical cyclones to directly affect the Iberian Peninsula. As the season falls outside the scope of the Atlantic hurricane database, records of most storms in 1842 are scarce, and only approximate tracks are known.

=== Hurricane One ===
The First North Carolina Hurricane of 1842. July 10–14. A major hurricane hit near Portsmouth, North Carolina, near Ocracoke on July 12. Two ships were capsized, killing their entire crews. It continued across Virginia, dissipating over Maryland. A second hurricane hit the same area in North Carolina just six weeks later.

=== Tropical Storm Two ===
July 31-August 2. A tropical storm affected Northeastern Florida near Cedar Keys on August 2 and continued on to Jacksonville.

=== Hurricane Three ===
The Second North Carolina Hurricane of 1842. August 24. A second North Carolina hurricane hit Ocracoke, North Carolina, on August 24, drowning livestock and washing away homes. In addition, it sank three ships, causing at least 8 deaths.

=== Hurricane Four ===
Antje's / Florida Keys Hurricane. August 24-September 8. A westward moving hurricane originating near the Leeward Islands, nicknamed Antje's hurricane after a schooner of the same name that was dismasted by the storm. The cyclone moved across the Florida Keys on September 4. Damaged Sand Key lighthouse. It continued westward across the Gulf of Mexico, landing between Matamoros and Tampico, Mexico. Its unusual westward movement, also seen by a hurricane in 1932 and Hurricane Anita in 1977, was due to a strong high pressure system to its north.

=== Hurricane Five ===
The Galveston Hurricane of 1842. September 9–30. A strong tropical storm started near Tobago and traveled into the Gulf of Mexico and hit Galveston on September 17. It caused $10,000 in damage, and killed 40 cattle.

=== Tropical Storm Six ===
September 22-23. The Florida Panhandle experienced the effects of a tropical storm, marked by gale-force winds at Pensacola on September 22 and 23. No appreciable damage was reported. Ludlum considered that this may have been a continuation of the Galveston storm, but judged it to be a separate system.

=== Hurricane Seven ===
The Gulf to Bermuda Hurricane of 1842. September 30-October 9. A hurricane passed by Galveston on October 5, causing flooding and the sinking of one ship. It continued eastward, becoming a major hurricane before hitting near St. Marks, Florida. It caused $500,000 in damage before moving out to sea near Bermuda on the 10th. A 20-foot storm surge was reported at Cedar Key, Florida.

=== Hurricane Eight ===
October 24-October 27. A cyclone, first detected southwest of Madeira on October 24, passed the island on October 26, moving northeast towards the Iberian Peninsula. It struck southern Spain on October 29, and moved inland as far as Madrid. It peaked at 965 mbar (28.5 inHg) as a Category 2 hurricane near Madeira on October 26. The storm can be considered a historical precedent for Hurricane Vince of the 2005 Atlantic hurricane season.

=== Tropical Storm Nine ===
October 24-November 1. This cyclone was first detected east of Miami on October 26. It paralleled the coastlines of Florida, Georgia, and South Carolina before dissipating on the 30th south of North Carolina.

== 1843 Atlantic hurricane season ==
=== Tropical Storm One ===
July 11–14. A Tropical storm hit near Jamaica then traveled near the Florida Keys.

=== Hurricane Two ===
August 15–20. September 30-October 9. Hurricane originated north of the Leeward Islands and traveled northward out to sea near Nova Scotia.

=== Hurricane Three ===
The Port Leon Florida Hurricane of 1843. September 13–15. September 30-October 9. A major hurricane moved northward through the Gulf of Mexico. It hit Port Leon, Florida, on September 13, destroying the town from the flooding and storm surge. Fourteen people were killed. The town residents moved the town three miles (5 km) northward to New Port, now called Newport, Florida. The storm continued on up to Maryland.

== 1844 Atlantic hurricane season ==
=== Tropical Storm One ===
June 11-June 15. A tropical storm hit near Lake Charles, Louisiana, on June 11. It moved slowly northward to the west of the town, dissipating on the 15th.

=== Hurricane Two ===
The Matamoros Hurricane of 1844 August 4–5. A major hurricane moving through the Gulf of Mexico hit the Rio Grande valley on August 4. It slowly moved through the area, causing 70 deaths. It did not leave a house standing at the mouth of the river or the Brazos Santiago on the north end of the barrier island. The Mexican customs house was removed after this storm to the mainland.

=== Hurricane Three ===
September 8–16. On September 8, a hurricane moved into Florida south of St. Augustine. It moved across the state, emerging into the Gulf of Mexico before turning northeastward and hitting Florida again on the 9th. This hurricane destroyed most of what was left of the deserted town of St. Joseph, Gulf County, Florida.

=== Tropical Storm Four ===
September 25-October 2. Storm originated near the southern Leeward Islands and headed past Jamaica to Key West.

=== Hurricane Five ===
The Cuban Hurricane of 1844 September 30-October 7. A hurricane originating near Barbados hit Cuba on October 4, causing 101 deaths. It moved northeastward, bringing rain and strong winds to the United States coastline but remaining offshore. The schooner revenue cutter Vigilant, USRC Vigilant, was lost off Key West during this hurricane on the 4th and 5th. Many of the structures built by the Navy on Indian Key and all wharves were washed away.

== 1845 Atlantic hurricane season ==
=== Hurricane One ===
October 27–29. Hurricane reported near Bermuda out in the Atlantic Ocean.

== 1846 Atlantic hurricane season ==
=== Hurricane One ===
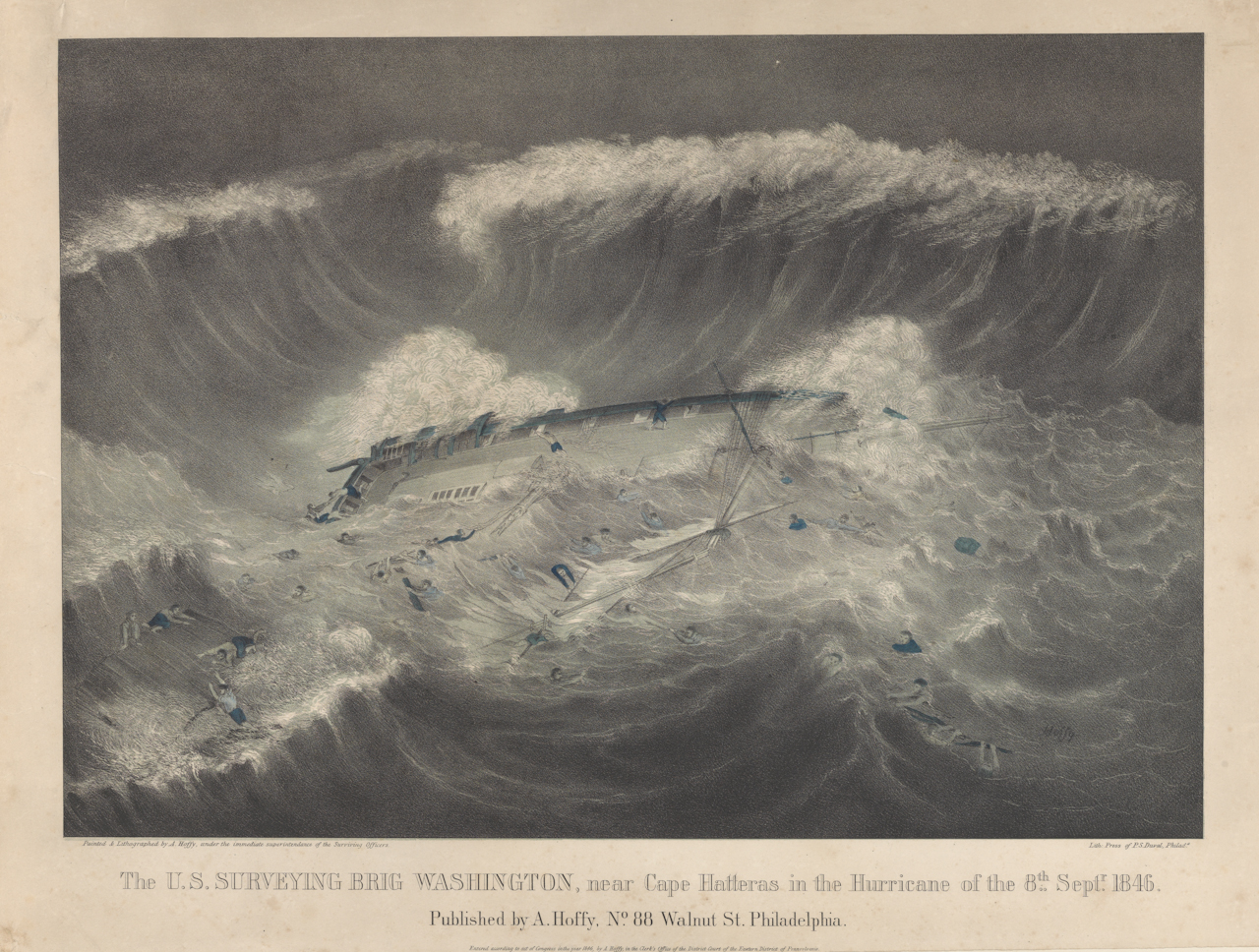
The U.S. Surveying Brig Washington near Cape Hatteras in the Hurricane of 8 September 1846

The Hatteras Inlets Hurricane of 1846. September 5–11. A slow-moving hurricane remained offshore of Cape Hatteras on September 6. It pushed water into the Pamlico Sound. When the hurricane moved far enough north, the northerly winds pushed the water back out, creating two major inlets on the Outer Banks, the Hatteras Inlet and the Oregon Inlet. The latter bearing the name of the first large ship that passed through it.

=== Hurricane Two ===
September 10–24. Hurricane originated near the Leeward Islands. On September 19, a gale, possibly a tropical cyclone, destroyed 11 schooners from Marblehead, Massachusetts, and took 65 lives. After this event, Gloucester, Massachusetts, took over as the center of New England fishing.

=== Tropical Storm Three ===
September 14. A tropical storm hit South Carolina.

=== Hurricane Four ===
The Great Havana Hurricane of 1846. October 5–15.

In October, a major hurricane, likely of Category 5 intensity, moved through the Caribbean Sea. This Great Havana Hurricane struck western Cuba on October 10. Atmospheric pressure readings in Cuba reached as low as 916 mbar. Although no reliable wind measurements were available at the time, a separate study also estimated that it produced Category 5-strength winds. In Cuba, the storm caused hundreds of deaths, capsized dozens of ships, obliterated buildings, uprooted trees, and ruined crops. Many towns were wholly destroyed or flattened and never recovered, while others disappeared entirely.

It hit the Florida Keys on October 11, destroying the old Key West Lighthouse, the Sand Key Light, and Fort Zachary Taylor. In Key West, widespread destruction was noted, with 40 deaths, many vessels rendered unfit, and widespread structural damage, with all but eight of the 600 houses in Key West damaged or destroyed. Water rose to about 8 feet in lower streets. Few supplies arrived in the following days and relief efforts were gradual, with few resources within the town's vicinity. The hurricane was so destructive that years afterward, greenery on the key was sparse, and little native vegetation existed. Signs of ecological damage remained even in the early 1880s. The hurricane then headed northward, and on October 13 and hit Southwest Florida as a major hurricane. As it approached, it sucked the water out of the bay, causing the Manatee River to be so low that people walked horses across it. The hurricane moved across Florida, and remained inland over Georgia, South Carolina, North Carolina. It moved up the Chesapeake Bay, causing extensive damage through Virginia, Maryland, Washington, D.C., and Pennsylvania. Some disputed reports say that at least 600 were killed; however, the official death report from Cuba says 163 deaths and damage throughout the areas it affected.

== 1847 Atlantic hurricane season ==
=== Hurricane One ===
October 10–13. A hurricane hit Tobago on October 11, resulting in 27 casualties.

=== Tropical Storm Two ===
A severe tropical cyclone visited Galveston, Texas. This may represent a continuation of the previous storm.

== 1848 Atlantic hurricane season ==
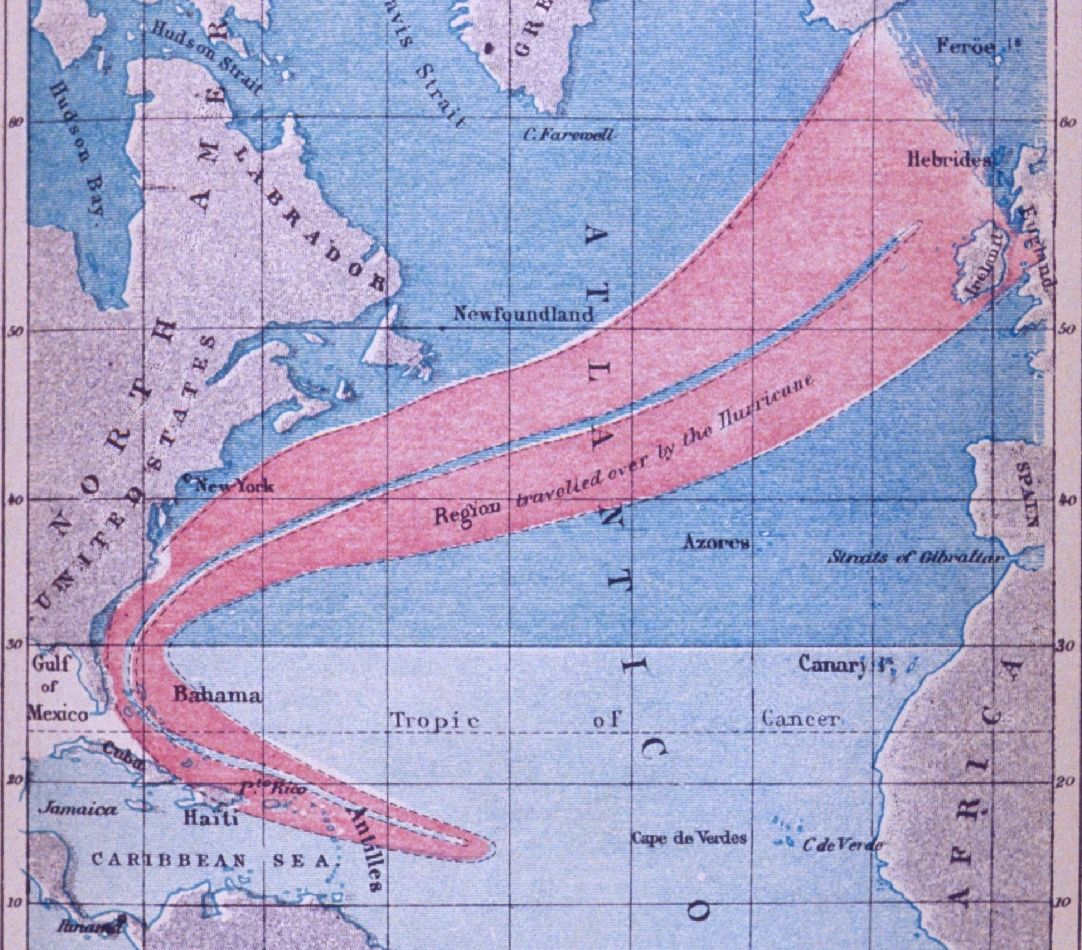
Track of Hurricane II of 1848

=== Tropical Storm One ===
On August 18, a tropical storm hit south central Louisiana, causing damage to cotton crops.

=== Hurricane Two ===
August 18-September 2. A hurricane tracked northeast of the Caribbean Sea through the Bahamas and recurved through the North Atlantic shipping lanes towards Europe between August 19 and September 2. This storm was one of the earliest tropical cyclones to have a track created.

=== Hurricane Three ===
The Tampa Bay Hurricane of 1848

September 23–28. It first made landfall in Tampa Bay, near Fort Brooke and Tampa nearly destroying the city. It reshaped parts of the coast and destroyed much of what few human works and habitation were then in the Tampa Bay Area. Although available records of its wind speed are unavailable, its barometric pressure and storm surge were consistent with at least a Category 4 hurricane. It was the most severe hurricane to affect Tampa Bay in the U.S. state of Florida and is one of only two major hurricanes to make landfall in the area, the other having occurred in 1921. Tides rose 15 feet (4.6 m) and the barometric pressure dipped to 28.18 inHg (954 millibars). It crossed to the east coast where it damaged houses, caused flooding and interfered with shipping. It then hit near present-day Sarasota, Florida, on September 25, creating a new waterway now called New Pass, named by William Whitaker as the first person to see this new waterway.

=== Hurricane Four ===
September 17–24. Hurricane passed north of Leeward Islands to out in the Atlantic Ocean.

=== Tropical Storm Five ===
September 28–29. Tropical storm formed near west of Cape Verde.

=== Hurricane Six ===
The Second Tampa Bay Hurricane of 1848. October 5–15. An eastward moving major hurricane passing Cuba hit Tampa Bay again for the second time in less than a month on October 11 before heading northward into the Florida Panhandle.

=== Hurricane Seven ===
On October 17, a minimal hurricane hit the southeast coast of Texas, causing flooding and high tides.

== 1849 Atlantic hurricane season ==
=== Tropical Storm One ===
August. A tropical cyclone may have moved into the Arklatex, as there was excessive flooding in northern sections of Louisiana that August.

=== Hurricane Two ===
Gale at Brazos Santiago of 1849. September 4–15. One of the severest hurricanes and longest duration up to that time moved into the Rio Grande area on September 13 and 14. There were sixteen vessels in harbor at Brezos when the hurricane hit. Many broke anchor and were dragged out to sea, others capsized and sunk.

=== Hurricane Three ===
September 10-22. A hurricane was first detected east of the Bahamas. Traveling west, it then struck Nassau in the Bahamas. It then curved and went to Bermuda.

=== Hurricane Four ===
The New England Hurricane of 1849. October 5-7. A hurricane was first detected off the coast of North Carolina in early October. It moved northeastward, passing close but remaining offshore of Long Island. On October 6, it made landfall in Massachusetts, causing 143 deaths.

== See also ==
- Atlantic hurricane season
- Lists of Atlantic hurricanes
