= Newport, Florida =

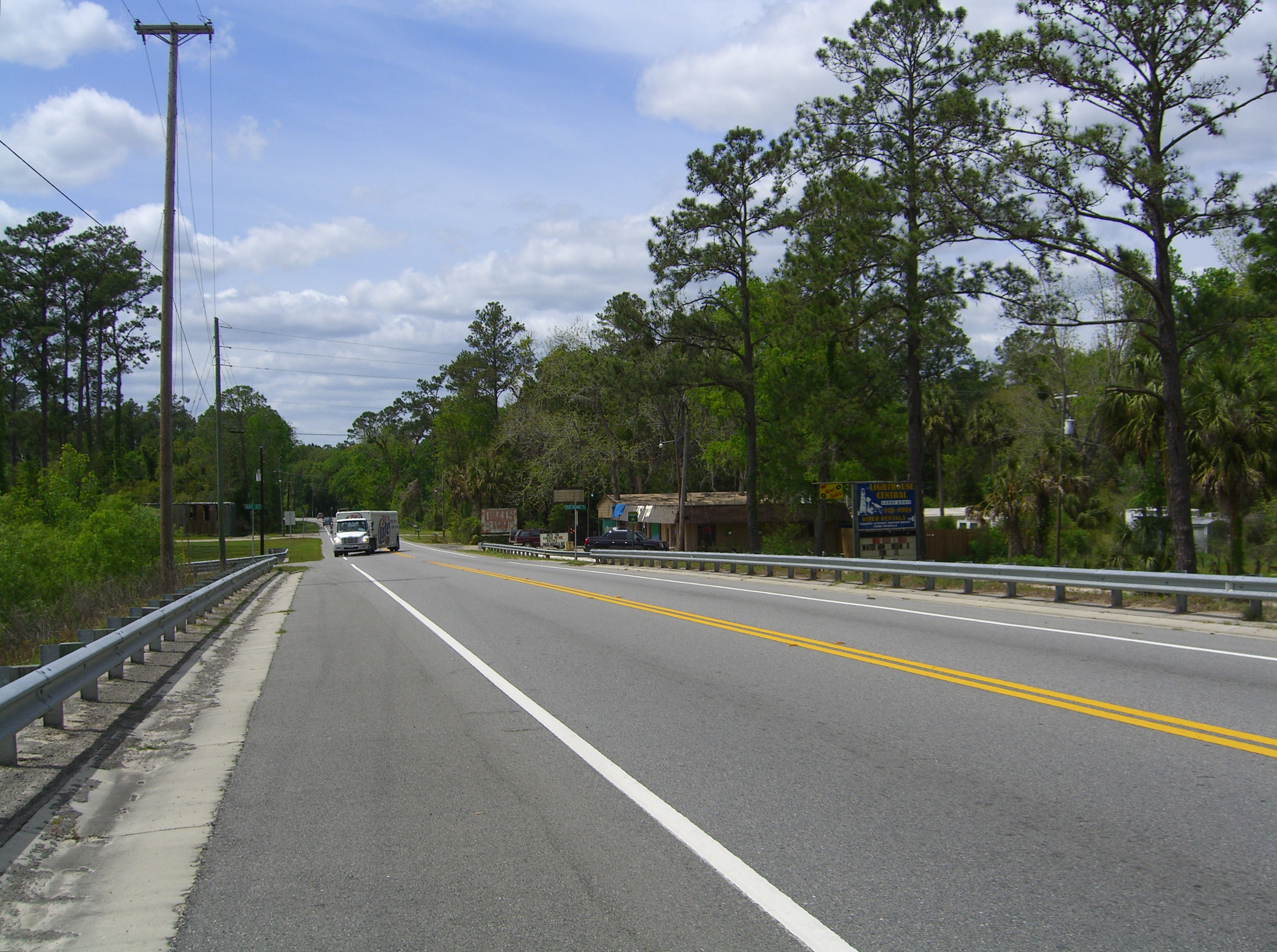
- Westbound US 98 as it enters Newport from the George Nesmith Bridge.
- Interactive map of Newport, Florida
- Coordinates: 30°12′N 84°11′W
- Country: United States
- State: Florida
- Counties: Wakulla
- Time zone: UTC-5 (EST)
  - Summer (DST): UTC-4 (EDT)

Newport is a small unincorporated community in Wakulla County, Florida, United States of America, situated where U.S. Highway 98 meets State Road 267.

== History ==
=== 1840s ===
In 1841, the current Newport area and the community of Port Leon, just south, endured a severe yellow fever epidemic. In 1843 Port Leon, located on the St. Marks River, was devastated by a hurricane that produced a 10-foot storm surge. The area still struggles against the same recurring hurricane surges that move up the St. Marks River entrance.

After the hurricane of September 13, 1843, washed away all of the homes, buildings and railroad tracks in Port Leon promoters Nathaniel Hamlin, James Ormond, Peter H. Swain and several others met a week later and made plans to establish another town.

They spent several days searching for a site safe from the sea, then selected a piece of land on the west side of the St. Marks River, about two miles below the old town of Magnolia, Florida. This location offered high ground, fewer swamps, and springs. It was owned by the Apalachicola Land Co. The organization permitted citizens who had suffered from the storm to draw lots at a cost of $25 and up.

The promoters named this new town Newport and platted it with four streets running east and west. The streets were New, Washington, Market and Adams. Those that extended north and south bore the names Bay, Pine, Elm and West. These street names were remarkably similar to those in St. Joseph, Florida territorial Florida's largest town, about 80 miles to the west down the coast.

==== A seat of government ====
Since most of Port Leon was destroyed by the storm, Newport became the seat of government in Wakulla County on Feb. 1, 1844. One of the priorities became removing the debris from the St. Marks River, a project discussed and attempted almost 20 years earlier. Dredging was undertaken, but it failed to really deepen or remove many of the rocks from the river. Daniel Ladd, Newport's leading cotton merchant, solved the situation by ordering a 100-foot steam tugboat named Spray, later the CSS Spray. Ladd used this craft to tow vessels into and out of Newport.

Although those involved in the cotton brokerage businesses built several warehouses at Newport, the town shared its shipping with St. Marks further down the river. By that time, the Tallahassee Railroad had rebuilt its tracks that had been destroyed in the storm of 1843, and 40 mules were back pulling cars. A stage coach transported passengers from the terminal near St. Marks to Newport. Exporting cotton, tobacco and animal hides and importing items such as flour, coffee, whiskey, gunpowder, quinine and other medicines by rail proved expensive.

==== A plank road ====
Newport competed as a port with nearby St. Marks that offered a rail connection to Tallahassee that, in the beginning, featured mule-pulled train cars. Inland cotton growers and shippers through the rail terminus at Tallahassee would carry their cargo to these river ports on the St. Marks River from which they would be carried to other ports and processing points along the gulf coast and eastern seaboard.

Although several roads led to Newport, the idea of a "plank road" became popular in the mid-19th century as an alternative to high railway charges and road-building problems. This type of road was introduced by the Spanish centuries earlier when they created routes of travel by laying logs across low places. Ladd, Ormond, John Denham, William McNaught and several others in Newport backed a plan to build a plank road proposed by Green and Joseph Chaires, wealthy Leon County planters.

The Florida Legislature incorporated the Georgia and Georgia-Florida Plank Road Company in 1851. The road was to run from Newport to Thomasville, Georgia, but it was completed to only the Tallahassee vicinity. Wagons used this road at a cost of about $1, and it brought competition to the Tallahassee Railroad.

Eventually, the rail connection from St. Marks was upgraded to accommodate locomotive-pulled trains and the St. Marks port became dominant over Newport with their wood plank road to Tallahassee. Newport dwindled but remains intact with a handful of residents.

=== 1850s ===
In 1856, the Pensacola and Georgia Railroad obtained controlling interest in the Tallahassee-St. Marks Railroad. The new company improved the tracks and replaced the mules with a steam locomotive that cut travel time from five hours to two hours.

== Attractions ==
Newport has Newport Springs, a sulfur spring said to have healing properties. The spring empties into the St. Marks River. Below the springs there are a series of caves. Wakulla County has taken over maintenance of Newport Springs.

== Photo gallery ==
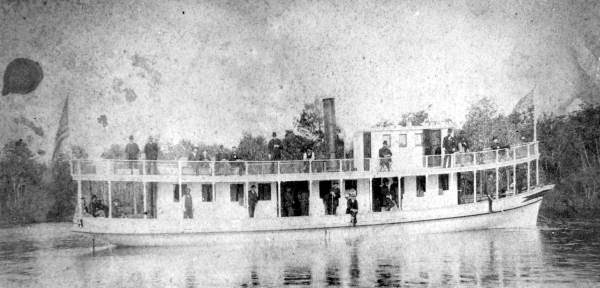
Steamboat Walkatomica loaded with passengers running on the waterway (1885)

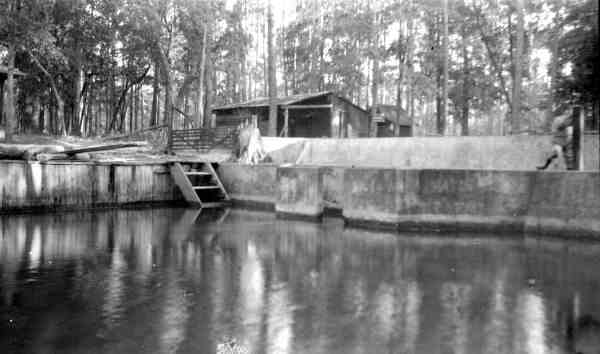
Newport springs and swimming pool (1921)

Houses at sulphur springs (1920s)

Florida State College for Women "F Club" (1920)

== Nearby attractions ==
- St. Marks Lighthouse
