= Thomas K. Frazer =

American marine scientist

Thomas K. Frazer is the dean of marine science at the University of South Florida (USF). He served as Florida's first chief science officer, a position created by Florida Governor Ron DeSantis who appointed Frazer.

He received his B.S. in Marine Fisheries from Humboldt State University, an M.S. in Fisheries and Aquatic Sciences from University of Florida, and his Ph.D. in Biological Sciences from University of California Santa Barbara.

Frazer previously at the University of Florida directed its School of Natural Resources and Environment. The creation of his state position and of a chief resilience officer was championed by environmentalists. He was involved in task force and legislative discussions about water pollution issues during his tenure. Frazer was succeeded in the office by Mark Rains.
