= St. Marks, Florida =

St. Marks, Florida San Marcos de Apalache
- City
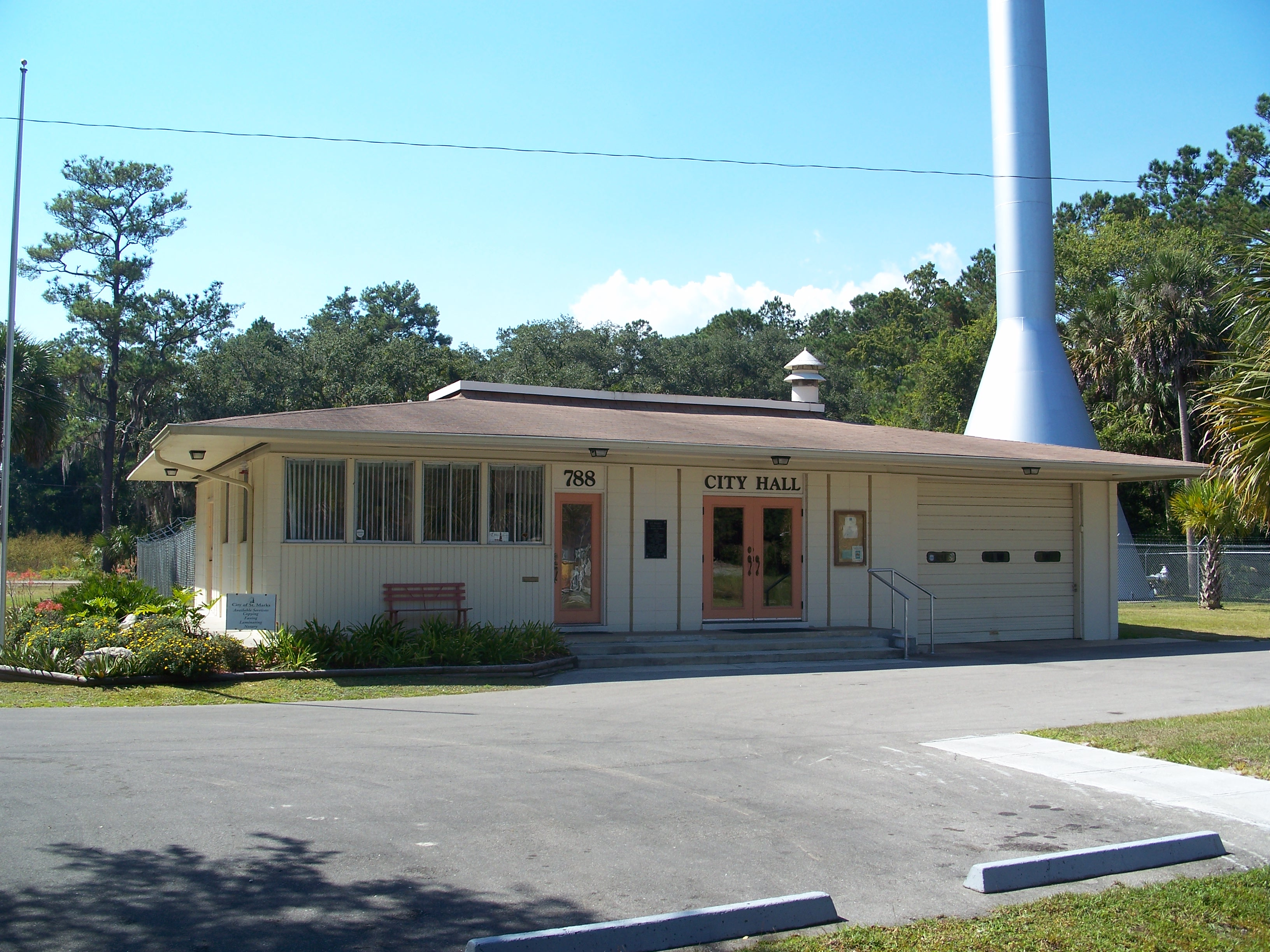
- St. Marks City Hall

- Logo

- Location in Wakulla County and the state of Florida
- Coordinates: 30°09′56″N 84°12′28″W
- Country: United States
- State: Florida
- County: Wakulla
- Settled by Spanish West Florida in Spanish Florida (San Marcos de Apalache): 1679–1783
- Settled by the US (Fort St. Marks): 1818–1821
- Incorporated (City of St. Marks): 1963

Government
  - Type: Commission-Manager
  - Mayor: Tim Lawrence
  - Commissioners: John Gunter, Sharon Rudd, Jeremy Alday, and Crystal Wonsch
  - City Manager: Katherine Gatewood
  - City Clerk: Paula Bell
  - City Attorney: Ronald A. Mowrey

Area
  - Total: 1.97 sq mi (5.09 km^{2})
  - Land: 1.96 sq mi (5.07 km^{2})
  - Water: 0.0077 sq mi (0.02 km^{2})
- Elevation: 13 ft (4.0 m)

Population (2020)
  - Total: 274
  - Density: 139.9/sq mi (54.01/km^{2})
- Time zone: UTC-5 (Eastern (EST))
  - Summer (DST): UTC-4 (EDT)
- ZIP code: 32355
- Area code(s): 850, 448
- FIPS code: 12-62825
- GNIS feature ID: 2405396
- Website: www.cityofstmarks.com

St. Marks or Saint Marks (Spanish: San Marcos), officially the City of St. Marks, is a city in Wakulla County, Florida, United States. Located in the eastern Florida panhandle along the Gulf of Mexico, it is part of the Tallahassee metropolitan area. The population at the 2020 census was 274, down from 293 at the 2010 census.

== Geography ==
According to the United States Census Bureau, the city has a total area of 1.9 square miles (4.9 km^{2}), of which 1.9 square miles (4.9 km^{2}) is land and 0.52% is water.

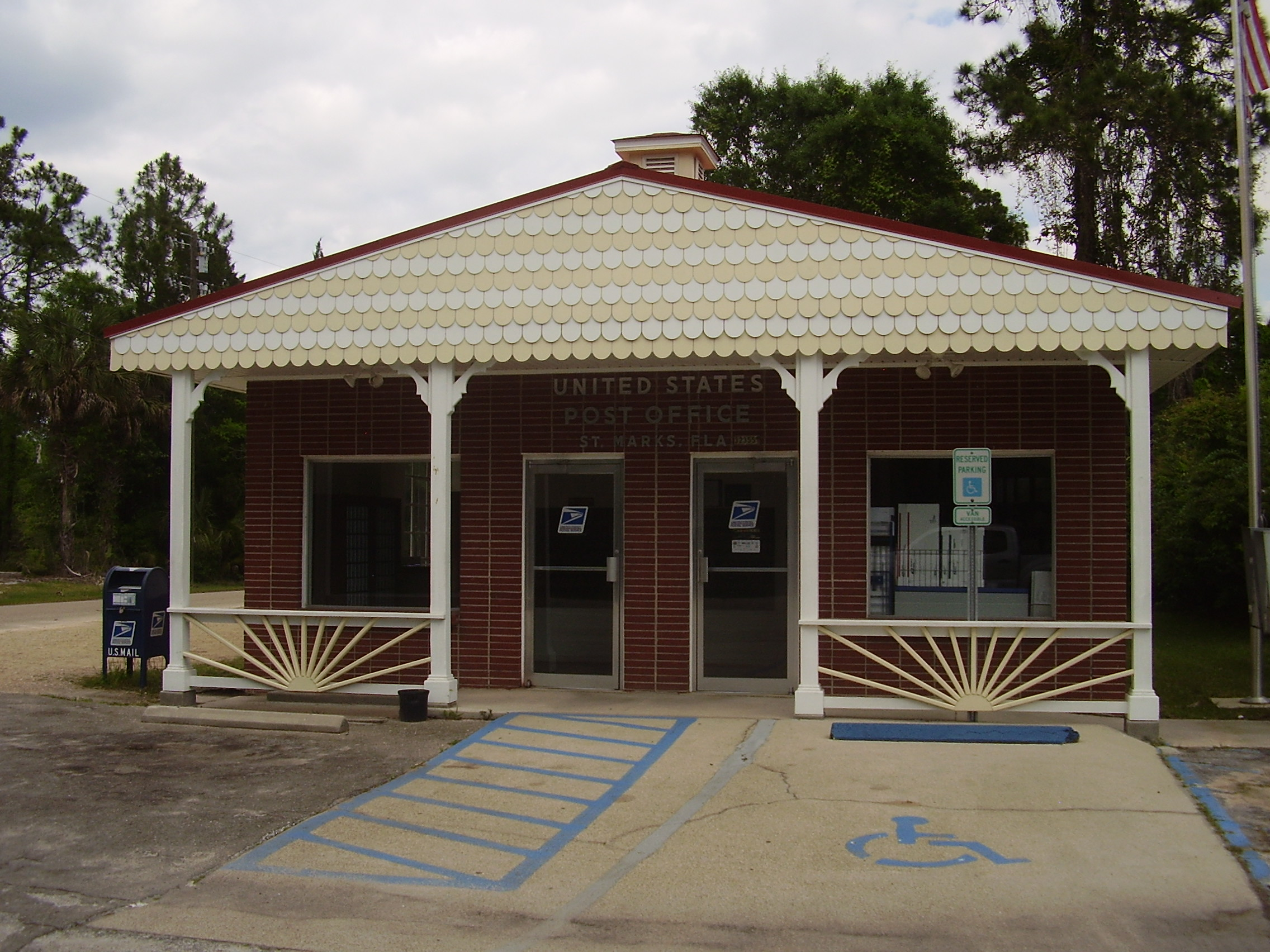
St. Marks United States Post Office

St. Marks is located on the Florida panhandle in North Florida, along the Gulf of Mexico.

=== Climate ===
The climate in this area is characterized by hot, humid summers and generally mild winters. According to the Köppen climate classification, St. Marks has a humid subtropical climate zone (Cfa).

== History ==
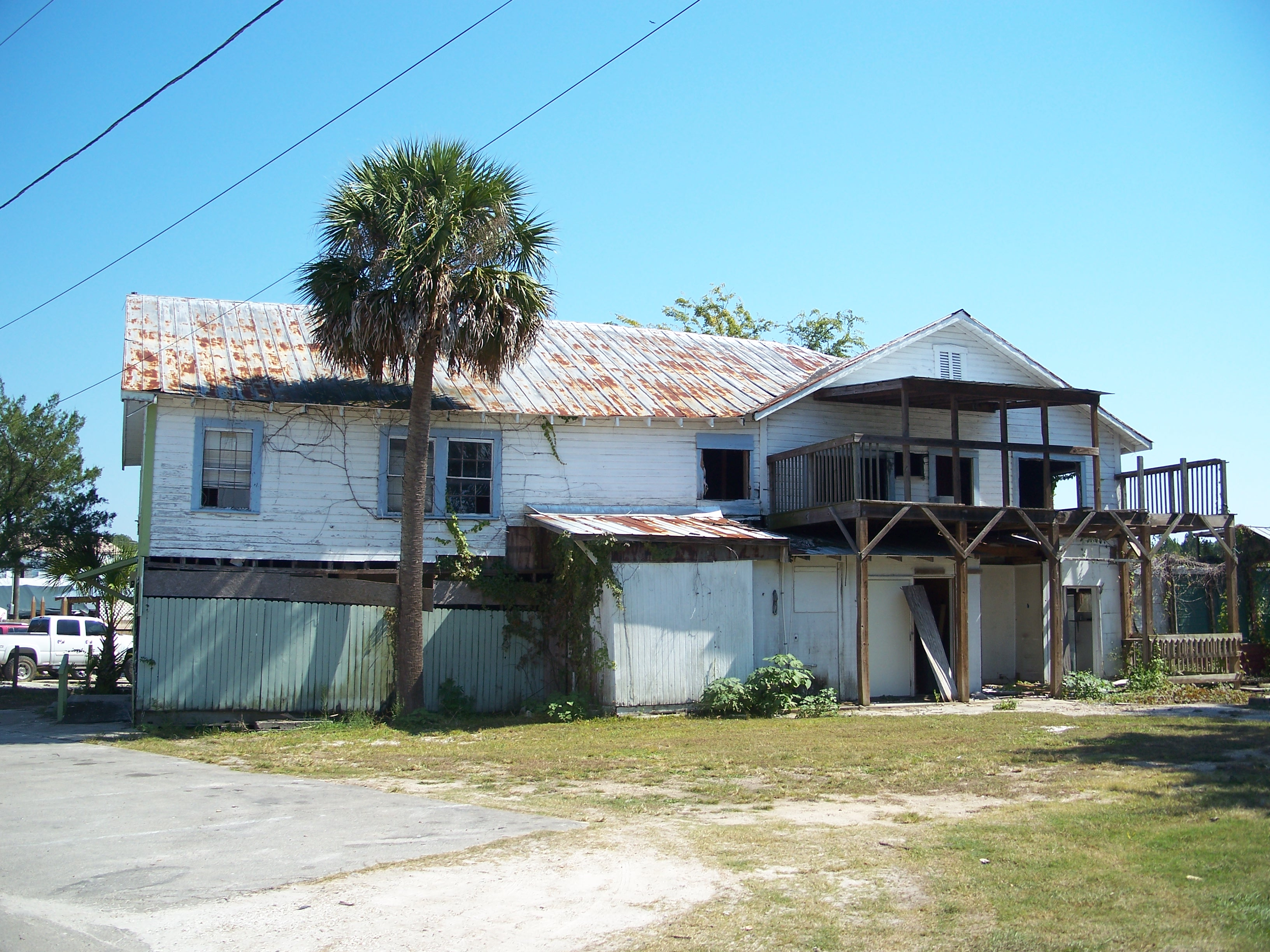
Posey's Bar, before it was torn down in 2010.

Originally known as San Marcos de Apalache and centered on a Spanish fort, this town was founded by the Spanish in the 17th century in what was then Spanish Florida (specifically Spanish West Florida). There was a trading post of Panton, Leslie & Company in the late 18th century. A long time has passed since St. Marks last had appreciable importance, but this place on Apalachee Bay in Florida's Big Bend is a very old and historic Gulf port. Fortifications built here by the Spanish in the 17th century, and rebuilt several times, provided the venue for force of arms repeatedly up through the American Civil War.

In the best-known incident, Andrew Jackson, in his incursion into Spanish West Florida in 1818, executed British nationals Robert Chrystie Ambrister and Alexander George Arbuthnot at the old fort, as well as the Muscogee ("Creek") religious leader called Francis the Prophet. This nearly embroiled the United States in international strife. San Marcos de Apalache Historic State Park interprets the site of the old fort.

Today's St. Marks evidently has its roots in American commercial activity that took hold beneath the walls of the fort upon acquisition of Spanish Florida by the U.S. in 1821—before the settlement moved slightly up the St. Marks River to the present position. Various articles in publications like Florida Historical Quarterly relate how the fort site later held a government "naval" hospital to meet yellow fever emergencies in the merchant marine. And just afterward Confederate artillery batteries were established on the site in the Civil War. Their earthworks remain and are interpreted in the historic state park. But the site also exhibits old Spanish stonework, and not far away (though inaccessible), just down St. Marks River are shallow Spanish quarries where this limestone was evidently obtained in the 1730s.

Limestone quarried here by the Spanish helped to make the St. Marks Light lighthouse, constructed about 1830 by the U.S. government. The lighthouse stands, after a couple of reconstructions, at the mouth of the river six miles from town and accessible by road. The lighthouse is, like San Marcos de Apalache, on the National Register of Historic Places.

St. Marks was a seaport for all of Middle Florida and lower Georgia during this early period. Ellen Call Long, on her way to Tallahassee, described the port about 1830 as "a quaint little village, amphibious-like, consisting of a few dwelling houses, stores, etc., mostly built on stilts or piles, as if ready to launch when wind or tide prevailed."

A railroad often cited as Florida's first connected the port of St. Marks with the territorial capital, Tallahassee, some 20 miles inland. The line, the Tallahassee Railroad, was constructed about 1836, and until the American Civil War, it served in the export of Central Florida's cotton through St. Marks.

The capacity of the St. Marks port was limited, and it was surpassed in the 19th century by the larger port of Apalachicola, served by the Thomasville, Tallahassee and Gulf Railroad via Carrabelle, Florida.

The City of St. Marks was officially incorporated as a municipality in 1963.

The now-abandoned rail line serves as Tallahassee-St. Marks Historic Railroad State Trail, a paved 16 miles (26 km) bicycle and equestrian trail terminating at the St. Marks waterfront.

On July 10, 2005, the section of the coast was damaged by storm surge associated with Hurricane Dennis, severely flooding the town and causing major damage to local businesses and homes. As on other occasions in its history, St. Marks was flooded badly with saltwater.

== Demographics ==
Historical population
Census	Pop.	Note	%±
1850	189		—
1930	217		—
1970	366		—
1980	286		−21.9%
1990	307		7.3%
2000	272		−11.4%
2010	293		7.7%
2020	274		−6.5%
U.S. Decennial Census

St. Marks first appeared in the 1850 U.S. census with a total population of 189.

=== 2010 and 2020 census ===
St. Marks racial composition (Hispanics excluded from racial categories) (NH = Non-Hispanic)
Race	Pop 2010	Pop 2020	% 2010	% 2020
White (NH)	284	242	96.93%	88.32%
Black or African American (NH)	5	4	1.71%	1.46%
Native American or Alaska Native (NH)	1	0	0.34%	0.00%
Asian (NH)	1	3	0.34%	1.09%
Pacific Islander or Native Hawaiian (NH)	0	0	0.00%	0.00%
Some other race (NH)	0	1	0.00%	0.36%
Two or more races/Multiracial (NH)	2	17	0.68%	6.20%
Hispanic or Latino (any race)	0	7	0.00%	2.55%
Total	293	274		

As of the 2020 United States census, there were 274 people, 167 households, and 140 families residing in the city.

As of the 2010 United States census, there were 293 people, 124 households, and 66 families residing in the city.

=== 2000 census ===
As of the census of 2000, there were 272 people, 137 households, and 79 families residing in the city. The population density was 141.0 inhabitants per square mile (54.4/km^{2}). There were 168 housing units at an average density of 87.1 units per square mile (33.6 units/km^{2}). The racial makeup of the city was 93.75% White, 2.57% African American, 0.74% Native American, 0.37% Asian, 1.10% from other races, and 1.47% from two or more races. Hispanic or Latino of any race were 0.37% of the population.

In 2000, there were 137 households, out of which 16.1% had children under the age of 18 living with them, 43.1% were married couples living together, 9.5% had a female householder with no husband present, and 42.3% were non-families. 36.5% of all households were made up of individuals, and 8.8% had someone living alone who was 65 years of age or older. The average household size was 1.99 and the average family size was 2.56.

In 2000, in the city, the population was spread out, with 15.8% under the age of 18, 7.4% from 18 to 24, 27.6% from 25 to 44, 31.6% from 45 to 64, and 17.6% who were 65 years of age or older. The median age was 44 years. For every 100 females, there were 104.5 males. For every 100 females age 18 and over, there were 110.1 males.

The median income for a household in the city was $25,156, and the median income for a family was $36,250. Males had a median income of $25,234 versus $21,458 for females. The per capita income for the city was $14,994. About 19.1% of families and 19.5% of the population were below the poverty line, including 27.3% of those under the age of eighteen and 6.7% of those 65 or over.

== See also ==
- Apalachee Bay
- San Marcos de Apalache Historic State Park
- St. Marks Light
- St. Marks River
- St. Marks National Wildlife Refuge
- Tallahassee-St. Marks Historic Railroad State Trail
- Edward Ball Wakulla Springs State Park
- Wakulla River
