= Tropical Storm Alberto (2006) =

Atlantic tropical storm

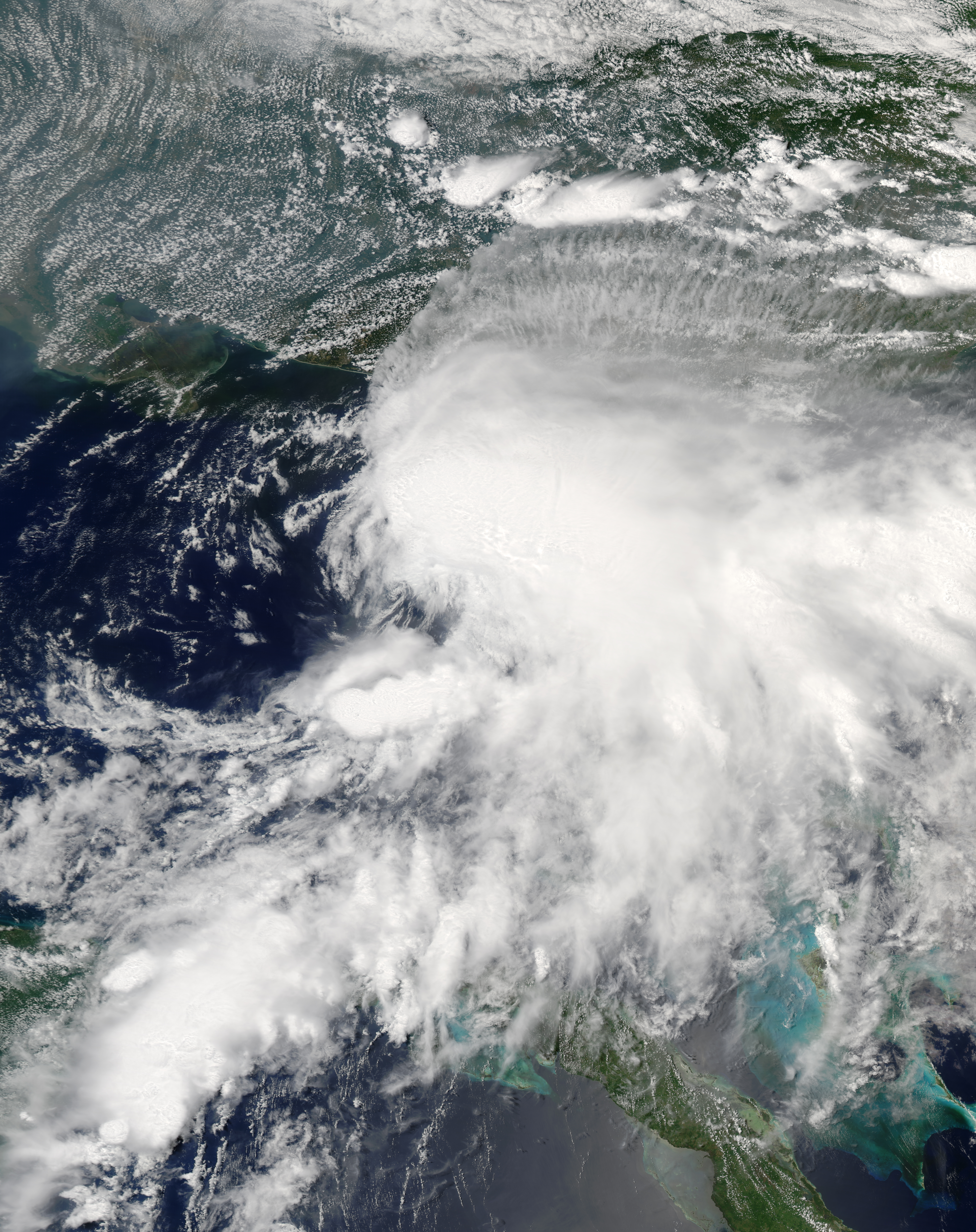
- Tropical Storm Alberto at peak intensity on June 12

Meteorological history
- Formed: June 10, 2006
- Extratropical: June 14, 2006
- Dissipated: June 19, 2006

Tropical storm
- 1-minute sustained (SSHWS/NWS)
- Highest winds: 70 mph (110 km/h)
- Lowest pressure: 995 mbar (hPa); 29.38 inHg

Overall effects
- Fatalities: 3 indirect
- Missing: 4
- Damage: $420,000 (2006 USD)
- Areas affected: Northwest Caribbean, Southeastern United States, Atlantic Canada
- IBTrACS
- Part of the 2006 Atlantic hurricane season

Tropical Storm Alberto was the first tropical storm of the 2006 Atlantic hurricane season. Forming on June 10 in the northwestern Caribbean, the storm moved generally to the north, reaching a maximum intensity of 70 mph (110 km/h) before weakening and moving ashore in the Big Bend area of Florida on June 13. Alberto then moved through eastern Georgia, North Carolina, and Virginia as a tropical depression before becoming extratropical on June 14.

Across the Western Caribbean, the storm produced heavy rainfall, causing some minor damage. In Florida, a moderate storm tide caused coastal damage and flooding, while Alberto's outer rainbands produced several tornadoes. The storm was indirectly responsible for two drownings off the coast of Tampa Bay. In North Carolina, heavy rainfall caused locally severe flooding, and one child drowned in a flooded storm drain near Raleigh. The remnants of Alberto produced strong winds and left four people missing in Atlantic Canada. Overall, damage was minor along Alberto's path.

== Meteorological history ==
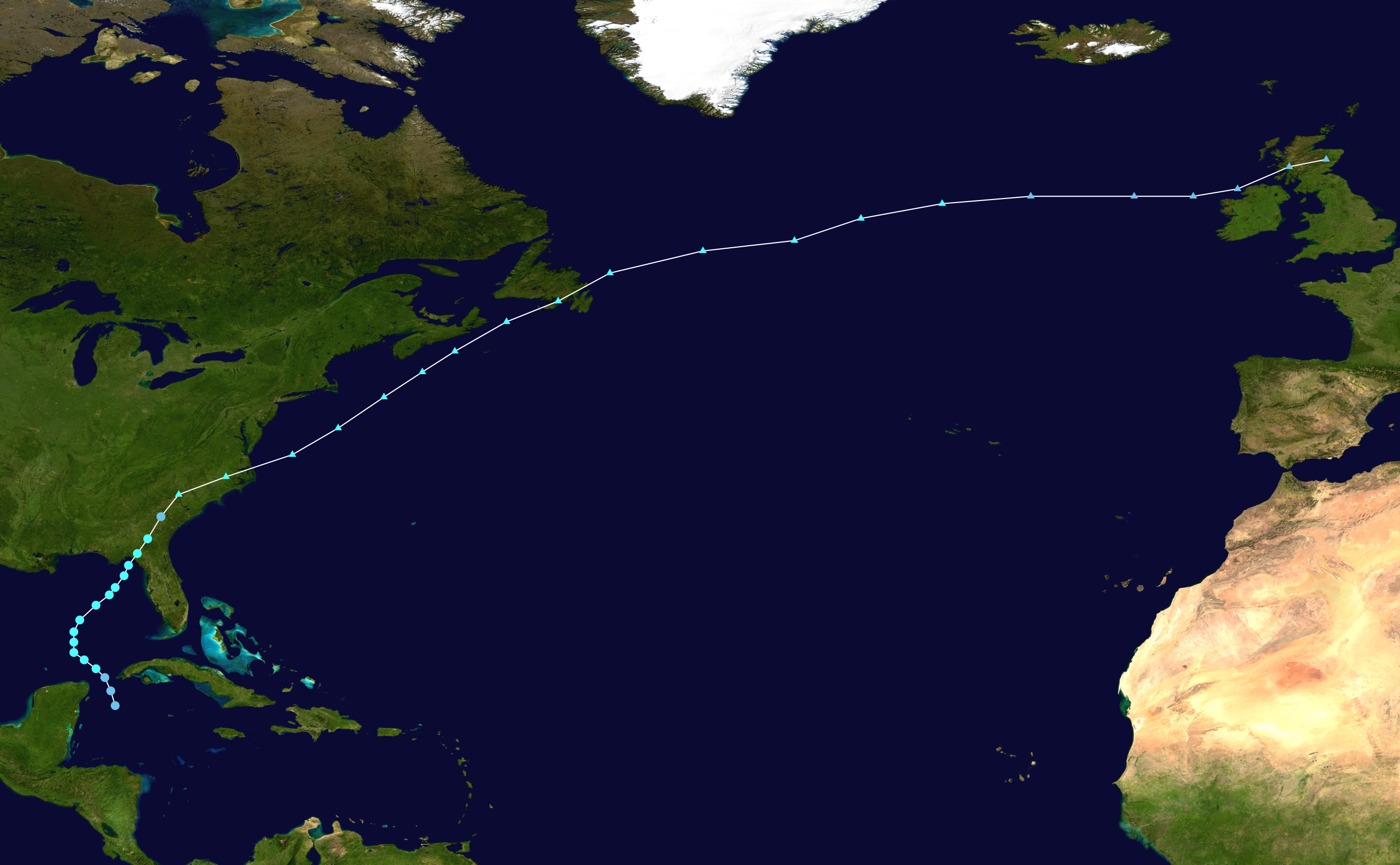
Map plotting the storm's track and intensity, according to the Saffir–Simpson scale Map key Saffir–Simpson scale Tropical depression (≤38 mph, ≤62 km/h) Tropical storm (39–73 mph, 63–118 km/h) Category 1 (74–95 mph, 119–153 km/h) Category 2 (96–110 mph, 154–177 km/h) Category 3 (111–129 mph, 178–208 km/h) Category 4 (130–156 mph, 209–251 km/h) Category 5 (≥157 mph, ≥252 km/h) Unknown Storm type Tropical cyclone Subtropical cyclone Extratropical cyclone, remnant low, tropical disturbance, or monsoon depression

In early June 2006, an area of convection persisted across Central America and the western Caribbean in association with a broad, nearly stationary trough of low pressure. Thunderstorms increased and became more concentrated on June 8 after a tropical wave moved into the western Caribbean, and an upper-level low to its west increased outflow over the system. The disturbance moved slowly north-northwestward, and development was initially inhibited by marginally favorable upper-level winds and land interaction. The system gradually organized, and by June 10 a circulation formed with sufficiently organized convection for the National Hurricane Center to classify it Tropical Depression One. At this point the storm was located about 140 miles (230 km) south of the western tip of Cuba.

The depression tracked to the northwest through the Yucatán Channel into an area of increased wind shear, which left the center exposed and elongated. Despite its poor structure, the system maintained strong winds in its eastern semicircle. The depression intensified into Tropical Storm Alberto early on June 11 about 260 miles (420 km) southwest of the Dry Tortugas, based on Hurricane Hunters' reports of flight level winds of 50 mph (80 km/h) in a few convective bands. Upon becoming a tropical storm, the low-level circulation had become better defined, though forecasts predicted the wind shear would increase, preventing significant strengthening of the storm. One forecaster at the National Hurricane Center remarked the system resembled a subtropical cyclone. However, deep convection developed and built westward against the wind shear as the overall organization improved. At the same time Alberto turned northeastward under the influence of an approaching trough. On June 12, the circulation abruptly reformed under the area of deepest convection, which coincided with the storm's passage over the loop current; consequentially, Alberto quickly strengthened to reach peak winds of 70 mph (110 km/h) about 220 miles (350 km) west-northwest of Tampa, Florida.

Though it was projected to track over cooler waters and stay in an area of increased shear, forecasters at the National Hurricane Center predicted Alberto would attain hurricane status and make landfall at that intensity. The storm maintained peak intensity for about 18 hours, and while accelerating northeastward, Alberto's convection diminished as the cloud pattern became elongated. On June 13, dry air became entrained in the circulation, leaving the center exposed from the convection and the wind field greatly broadened. A partial eyewall developed in the western semicircle of the center; however, winds were well below hurricane force. Alberto continued to weaken, and made landfall at about 1630 UTC on June 13 with 45 mph (72 km/h) winds in Taylor County, Florida, about 50 miles (80 km) southeast of Tallahassee.

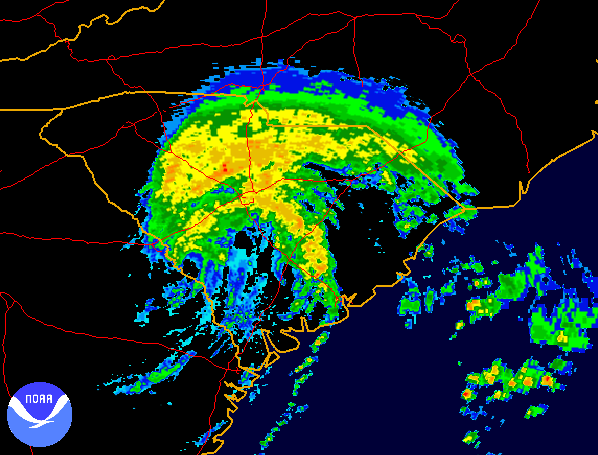
Tropical Storm Alberto over South Carolina

The storm maintained a well-organized structure and banding features over land, while continuing to produce winds of tropical storm force as it moved into Georgia. Early on June 14, the storm weakened to tropical depression status while located near the city of Millen, Georgia. Alberto began to lose tropical characteristics soon thereafter, and about six hours after weakening to a tropical depression it transitioned into an extratropical cyclone. Late on June 14 it accelerated northeastward to emerge into the Atlantic Ocean, and on June 15, it entered the area of responsibility of the Canadian Hurricane Centre. While over open waters, Alberto's remnants began to re-intensify; later that day, the extratropical remnant low attained winds of 65 mph (105 km/h) and a pressure of 969 mbar while a short distance south of Nova Scotia. At this time, the low presented a well-defined comma structure. After passing near Sable Island, the remnants of Alberto crossed the Avalon Peninsula of Newfoundland on June 16. The extratropical storm turned to the east-northeast and later to the east as it continued its rapid forward motion, and on June 19 the remnants of Alberto merged with an approaching cold front near the British Isles.

== Preparations ==
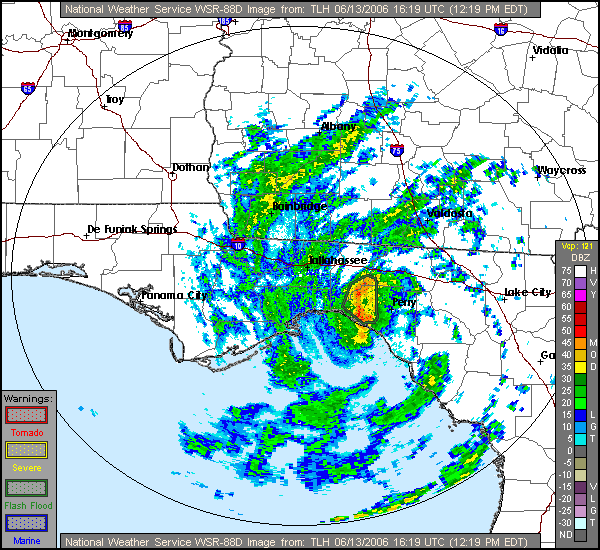
Radar image of Tropical Storm Alberto at landfall

By June 12, the Cuban government had evacuated over 25,000 people in the western portion of the country due to the threat of flooding. The National Hurricane Center recommended tropical storm warnings for the Isle of Youth and the Pinar del Río Province early on June 10, but they were not issued by the Cuban government.

In northwestern Florida, officials issued a mandatory evacuation order a day before the storm moved ashore for about 21,000 citizens in Levy County, Citrus County, and Taylor County. Several schools were closed as well, and converted into shelters. In all, about 350 coastal residents took refuge in emergency shelters. Prior to the arrival of the storm, Florida governor Jeb Bush declared a state of emergency for the state. A tropical storm watch was first issued for portions of the Florida Panhandle about 43 hours prior to landfall. As Alberto was predicted to continue intensifying, the National Hurricane Center issued a hurricane warning from Longboat Key to the mouth of the Ochlockonee River approximately 25 hours before landfall. A tropical storm warning extended southward to Englewood and westward to Indian Pass. A tropical storm warning was also issued from Flagler Beach, Florida to the mouth of the Santee River in South Carolina. As the storm moved inland, local National Weather Service offices issued flood watches for portions of North Carolina, Virginia, and the Delmarva Peninsula. Additionally, flood and flash flood warnings were issued for some portions of the country from South Carolina through Virginia.

While Alberto was becoming extratropical over land, the Canadian Hurricane Centre issued gale warnings for offshore waters of Nova Scotia, and later for Newfoundland. In addition, the Atlantic Storm Prediction Center issued inland wind warnings for coastal regions of Nova Scotia. Due to the prediction for precipitation, the Atlantic Storm Prediction Center posted rainfall warnings for all Atlantic coastal regions of Nova Scotia.

== Impact ==
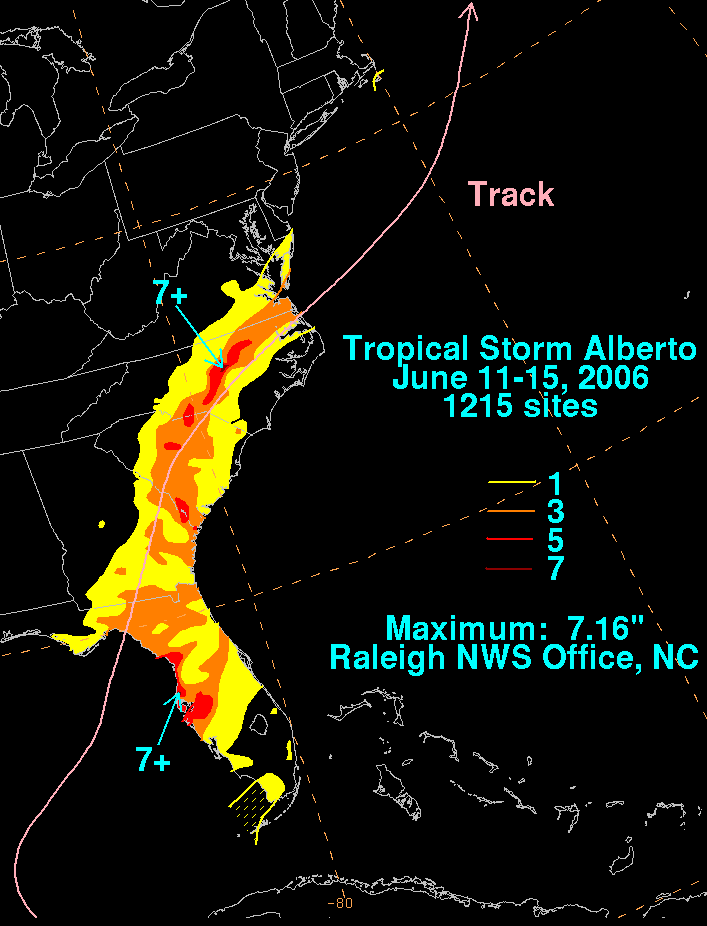
Storm rainfall in the United States

=== Caribbean ===
In its early stages of development, the tropical depression which later became Alberto produced heavy rainfall across the western Caribbean. A station on Grand Cayman reported 22.72 inches (577 mm) of rain in one 24-hour period. In Cuba, rainfall amounted to 17.52 inches (445 mm) in Pinar del Río province, where one station recorded 4.06 inches (103 mm) in one hour. On the Isle of Youth, precipitation accrued to 15.67 inches (398 mm) in Sumidero. Air and marine travel was disrupted between the Cuban mainland and the Isle of Youth. In Havana Province rainfall totaled 8.46 inches (215 mm) at Playa Baracoa. Much of the precipitation fell over a fairly short period of time, and was beneficial, as the area had been suffering from severe drought conditions. In Pinar del Río province, the precipitation flooded 50 mi^{2} (130 km^{2}) of crop land. The storm damaged about 50 houses across the country, about half of which in Havana.

Alberto dropped light amounts of rainfall across Mexico, with a 24-hour total peaking at 4 inches (100 mm) in Peto, Yucatán. Light rain was also reported throughout Quintana Roo and in eastern Campeche.

=== Florida ===
The large area of convection associated with Alberto dropped rainfall across Florida for several days. The statewide precipitation maximum reached 7.08 inches (180 mm) at a station 5 miles (8.0 km) east of Tarpon Springs. The highest sustained winds from the storm were officially clocked at 40 mph (64 km/h) in St. Petersburg, which also saw reports of wind gusts of up to 56 mph (90 km/h). Upon making landfall on the Florida Panhandle, the storm produced a storm tide which unofficially peaked at 7.3 feet (2.2 m) at the Crystal River Power Plant. The combination of high surf and the storm tide caused surge flooding along the Florida Panhandle. Six tornadoes were spawned in the state from the outer rainbands of Alberto, none of which caused serious damage.

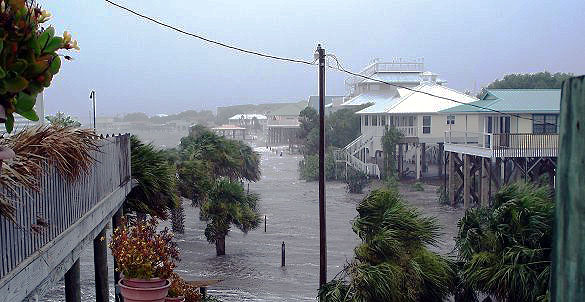
Storm surge flooding from Tropical Storm Alberto at Horseshoe Beach, Florida

Across coastal areas, the storm surge flooding caused minor damage to dozens of homes and closed several roads. Near Homosassa, two people who did not evacuate required water rescue. At Egmont Key State Park, a woman fell off of a boat when a band of showers and surging currents made navigation difficult; her husband and a friend drowned after jumping in to save her without life jackets, though the woman returned safely to the boat. The rainfall caused some temporary road flooding, though precipitation was mostly beneficial in alleviating drought conditions. Moderate wind gusts caused scattered power outages and downed some trees across the northeast portion of the state. Overall, property damage in the state rose to about $390,000 (2006 USD) in total.

=== Southeast United States ===
While the storm moved through the state of Georgia, moderate winds of up to 45 mph (72 km/h) occurred along the coastline. Rainfall ranged from 3–5 inches (76–127 millimetres) across the southeast portion of the state, with isolated higher maxima of up to 7.05 inches (179 mm) in Rincon. Alberto produced a storm tide of 8.53 feet (2.60 m) at Fort Pulaski National Monument, causing some beach erosion along the coastline.

Alberto produced winds of tropical storm force along the South Carolina coastline; the highest official wind gust was 51 mph (82 km/h) at Edisto Beach. The storm dropped precipitation across much of the state, including a state maximum of 4.42 inches (112 mm) at Pritchardville. Storm tides reached 7.81 feet (2.38 m) above the mean low-level water mark along Fripp Island, leading to some beach erosion along portions of the coastline. While in the process of becoming extratropical, the rainbands of Alberto spawned seven confirmed tornadoes in the state, most of which rated F0; a National Weather Service report indicated additional tornadoes may have occurred in the state. The tornadoes caused some minor damage, though overall damage in the state was minimal.

The remnants of Alberto dropped heavy precipitation across North Carolina, including a nationwide high of 7.16 inches (182 mm) at the Raleigh National Weather Service Office. Some totals broke previous rainfall records, including the station at Raleigh-Durham International Airport which broke the all-time daily precipitation record for that station. The rainfall led to flooding across the central portion of the state, with 45 flash flood warnings issued by the Raleigh National Weather Service. Police and firefighters in Wake County performed 47 water rescues. Additionally, the Raleigh-Wake 9-1-1 center received more than 1,076 calls for help. Flash flooding occurred throughout the area, which caused the Crabtree Creek in Raleigh to crest at 23.77 feet (7.25 m); this was the second highest flood stage on record for the creek. The overflown creek flooded a few cars to their rooftops, and resulted in the closure of the Crabtree Valley Mall. Major flooding was reported elsewhere throughout the region, which closed several roads and damaged some houses. In Franklin County, an eight-year-old boy drowned after getting sucked into a flooded drainage system; the death is considered indirect because the boy was chasing a ball into the drainage system. Near the coast, the storm produced several waterspouts, some of which moved ashore in Dare and Carteret counties. Isolated reports of 60 mph (97 km/h) wind gusts resulted in downed trees and minor damage.

Rainfall from the storm extended into Virginia, the Eastern Shore of Maryland, and extreme southeastern Delaware. Precipitation totaled 5.8 inches (150 mm) in Virginia Beach, which caused flash flooding in the Hampton Roads area. The flooding closed several roads, though no major damage was reported.

=== Canada ===
The extratropical remnant of Alberto produced strong winds across the Canadian Maritimes, including gusts of 74 mph (119 km/h) in the Municipality of the District of Barrington of Nova Scotia. Sustained winds reached 51 mph (82 km/h). Rainfall from the storm was moderate, with some locations reporting 0.4 inches (10 mm) per hour; totals exceeded 2 inches (51 mm) in numerous areas. Due to wet grounds, the winds knocked down some trees and several tree limbs, and also downed some power lines, causing localized power outages. Moderate winds and rainfall affected Newfoundland, as well. According to a press report, the storm left four sailors missing about 230 miles (370 km) south of Nova Scotia.

== See also ==
- Other storms of the same name
- Timeline of the 2006 Atlantic hurricane season
- List of Florida hurricanes (2000–present)
- List of North Carolina hurricanes (2000–present)
- Tropical Storm Barry (2007)
- Tropical Storm Andrea (2013)
- Tropical Storm Colin (2016)
- Tropical Storm Alex (2022)
