= Timeline of the 2006 Atlantic hurricane season =

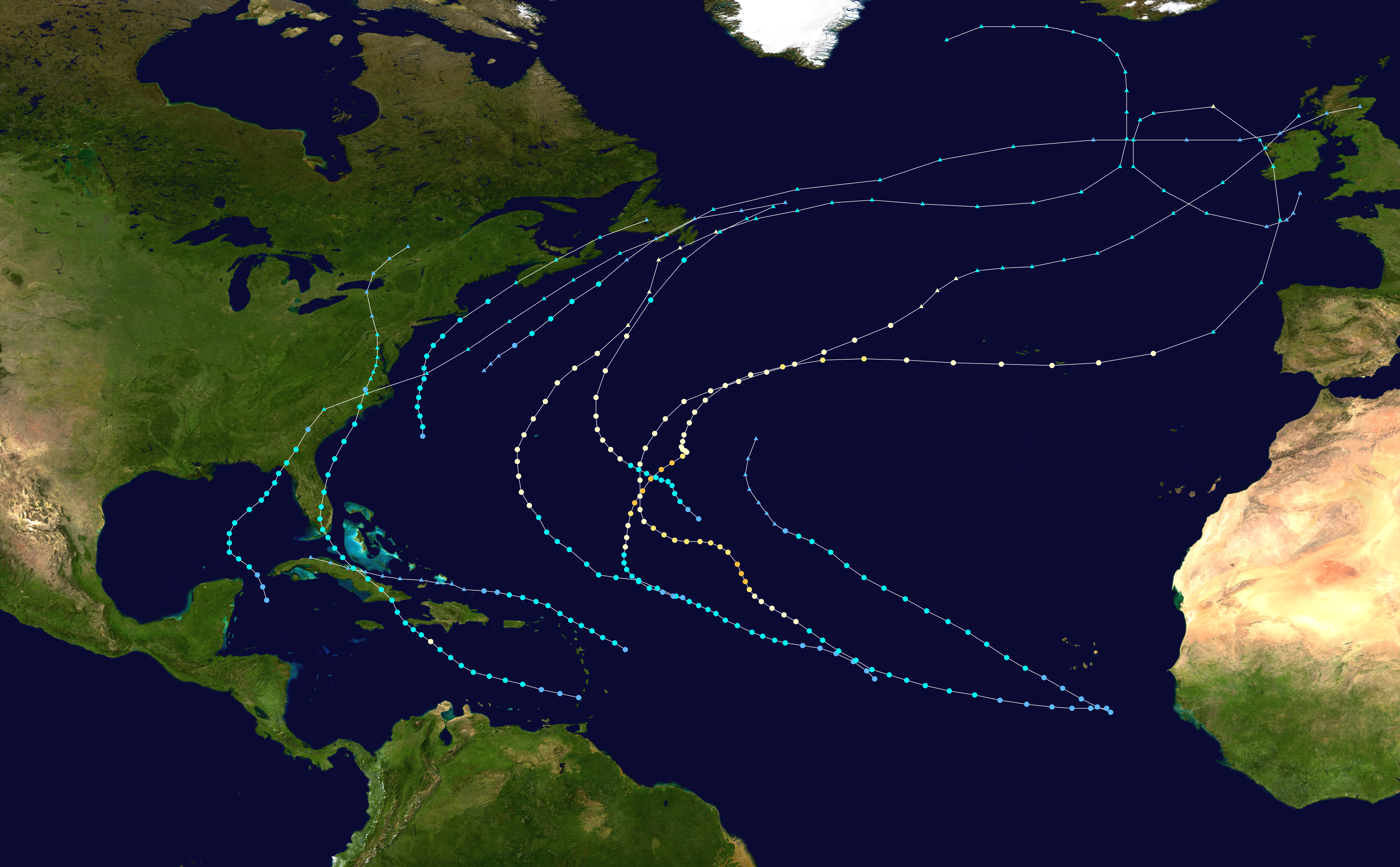
- Season summary map

Season boundaries
- First system formed: June 10, 2006
- Last system dissipated: October 2, 2006

Strongest system
- Name: Gordon and Helene
- Maximum winds: 120 mph (195 km/h) (1-minute sustained)
- Lowest pressure: 955 mbar (hPa; 28.2 inHg)

Longest lasting system
- Name: Florence
- Duration: 9 days
Storm articles
- Tropical Storm Alberto (2006)
- Tropical Storm Chris (2006)
- Hurricane Ernesto (2006)
- Hurricane Florence (2006)
- Hurricane Gordon (2006)

The 2006 Atlantic hurricane season was a cycle of the annual tropical cyclone season in the Atlantic Ocean in the Northern Hemisphere. The season officially began on June 1, 2006, and ended on November 30, 2006. These dates, adopted by convention, historically describe the period in each year when most subtropical or tropical cyclogenesis occurs in the Atlantic Ocean. The first storm to form in 2006 was Tropical Storm Alberto on June 10; (Note: The 2006 calendar year began with an off-season system active in the basin, as the 28th and final storm of the 2005 season, Tropical Storm Zeta, persisted until early January 2006.) the last, Hurricane Isaac, dissipated on October 2.

The season saw near average activity in terms of the overall number of cyclones. (Note: An average Atlantic hurricane season, as defined by the National Oceanic and Atmospheric Administration, has fourteen tropical storms, seven hurricanes and three major hurricanes.) There were ten named storms in the Atlantic basin in 2006, of which five became hurricanes with two intensifying further into major hurricanes. (Note: Hurricanes reaching Category 3 (wind speeds of 111 miles per hour (179 km/h)) or higher on the 5-level Saffir–Simpson wind speed scale are considered major hurricanes.) It was the first season since the 2001 season in which no hurricanes made landfall in the United States, and the first since the 1994 season that no tropical cyclones formed during October; activity was slowed by a rapidly forming El Niño event in 2006, the presence of the Saharan Air Layer over the tropical Atlantic, and the steady presence of a robust secondary high-pressure area to the Azores High centered on Bermuda.

This timeline documents tropical cyclone formations, strengthening, weakening, landfalls, extratropical transitions, and dissipations during the season. It includes information that was not released throughout the season, meaning that data from post-storm reviews by the National Hurricane Center, such as a storm that was not initially warned upon, has been included.

The time stamp for each event is first stated using Coordinated Universal Time (UTC), the 24-hour clock where 00:00 = midnight UTC. The NHC uses both UTC and the time zone where the center of the tropical cyclone is currently located. The time zones utilized (east to west) prior to 2020 were: Atlantic, Eastern, and Central. In this timeline, the respective area time is included in parentheses. Additionally, figures for maximum sustained winds and position estimates are rounded to the nearest 5 units (miles, or kilometers), following National Hurricane Center practice. Direct wind observations are rounded to the nearest whole number. Atmospheric pressures are listed to the nearest millibar and nearest hundredth of an inch of mercury.

== Timeline of storms ==
=== June ===
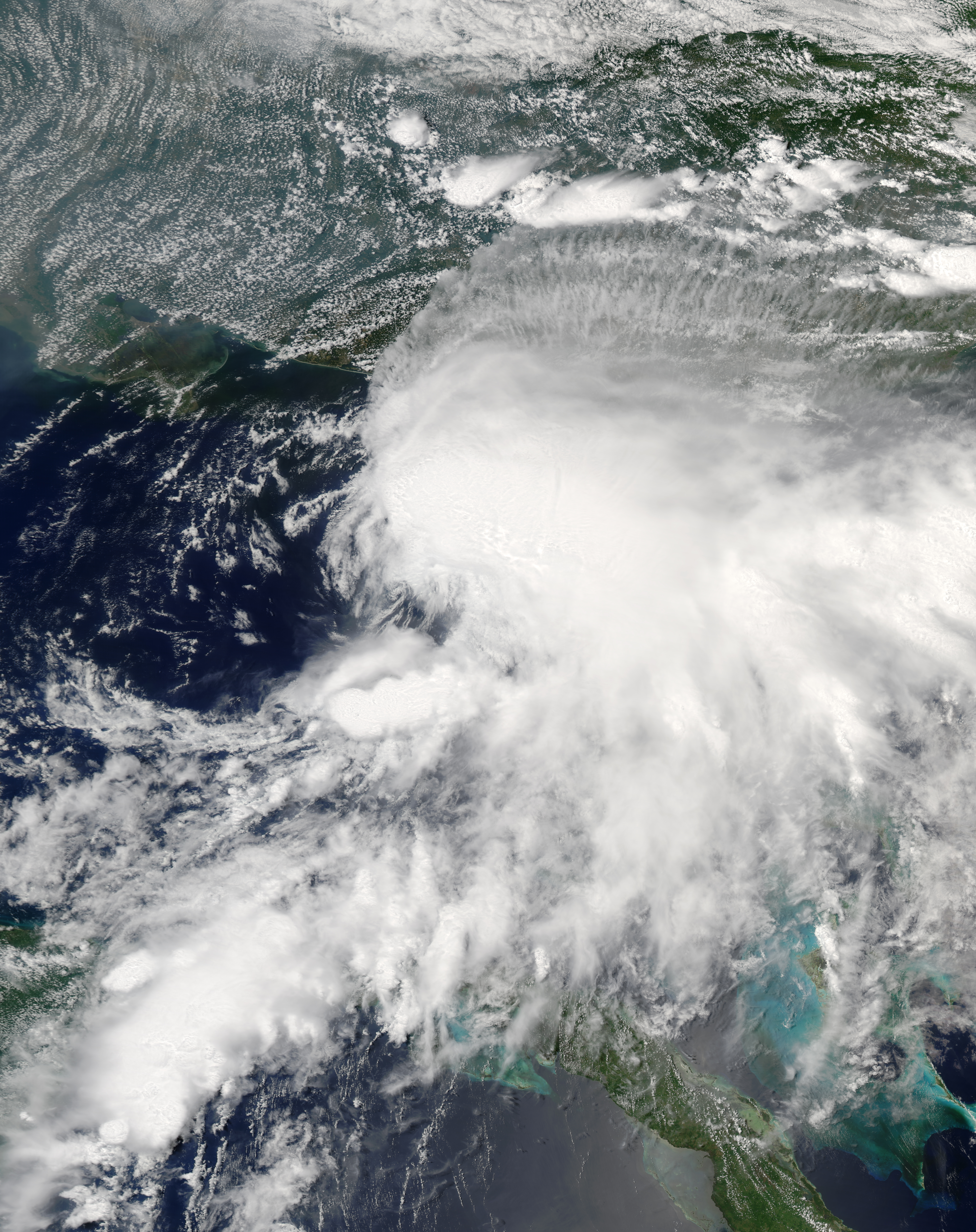
Tropical Storm Alberto

June 1

- The 2006 Atlantic hurricane season officially begins.

June 10

- 1 a.m. CDT (0600 UTC) – Tropical Depression One forms 120 nautical miles (140 mi; 220 km) south of the western tip of Cuba.
- 7 p.m. CDT (0000 UTC June 11) – Tropical Depression One strengthens into Tropical Storm Alberto.

June 13

- 12:30 p.m. EDT (1630 UTC) – Tropical Storm Alberto makes landfall near Adams Beach, Florida, with 45 mph (72 km/h) winds. (Note: The figures for maximum sustained winds and position estimates are rounded to the nearest 5 units (knots, miles, or kilometers), following the convention used in the National Hurricane Center's operational products for each storm. All other units are rounded to the nearest digit.)

June 14

- 2 a.m. EDT (0600 UTC) – Tropical Storm Alberto weakens into a tropical depression.
- 8 a.m. EDT (1200 UTC) – The remnants of Alberto become extratropical.

=== July ===
July 17

- 0600 UTC – A previously extratropical low-pressure area becomes a tropical depression about 210 nautical miles (240 mi; 390 km) southeast of Nantucket, Massachusetts. However, this depression is not assigned a number operationally, or warned on, by the National Hurricane Center.
- 1200 UTC – The tropical depression near Nantucket strengthens into a tropical storm, but is not operationally named.

July 18

- 8 a.m. EDT (1200 UTC) – Tropical Depression Two forms 250 nautical miles (290 mi; 460 km) east-southeast of Wilmington, North Carolina.
- 1200 UTC – The unnamed tropical storm degenerates into a remnant low.
- 2 p.m. EDT (1800 UTC) – Tropical Depression Two strengthens into Tropical Storm Beryl.

July 21

- 2:45 a.m. EDT (0645 UTC) – Tropical Storm Beryl makes landfall on the island of Nantucket, Massachusetts, with 50 mph (80 km/h) winds.
- 2 p.m. EDT (1800 UTC) – Tropical Storm Beryl becomes extratropical.

July 31

- 8 p.m. EDT (0000 UTC August 1) – Tropical Depression Three forms 205 nautical miles (236 mi; 380 km) east-southeast of Barbuda.

=== August ===
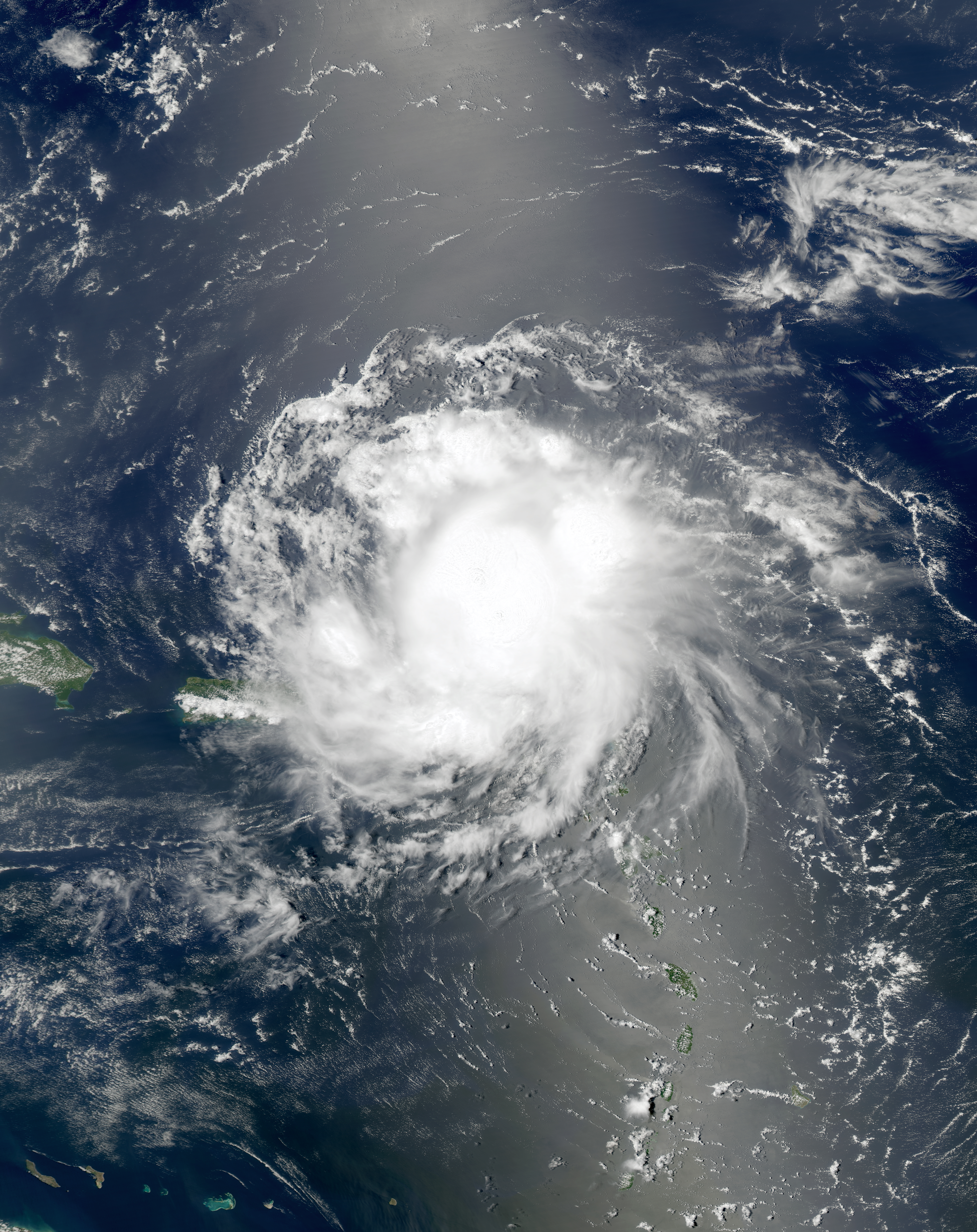
Tropical Storm Chris

August 1

- 2 a.m. AST (0600 UTC) – Tropical Depression Three strengthens into Tropical Storm Chris.

August 3

- 2 p.m. AST (1800 UTC) – Tropical Storm Chris weakens to a tropical depression.

August 4

- 2 a.m. AST (0600 UTC) – Tropical Depression Chris weakens into a remnant low.

August 21

- 2 p.m. AST (1800 UTC) – Tropical Depression Four forms 225 nautical miles (259 mi; 417 km) south-southeast of Praia, Cape Verde.

August 22

- 8 p.m. AST (0000 UTC August 23) – Tropical Depression Four strengthens into Tropical Storm Debby.

August 24

- 2 p.m. AST (1800 UTC) – Tropical Depression Five forms in the Caribbean about 40 nautical miles (46 mi; 74 km) north-northwest of Grenada.

August 25

- 8 a.m. AST (1200 UTC) – Tropical Depression Five strengthens into Tropical Storm Ernesto.

August 26

- 2 a.m. AST (0600 UTC) – Tropical Storm Debby weakens to a tropical depression.
- 8 a.m. AST (1200 UTC) – Tropical Depression Debby weakens into a low.

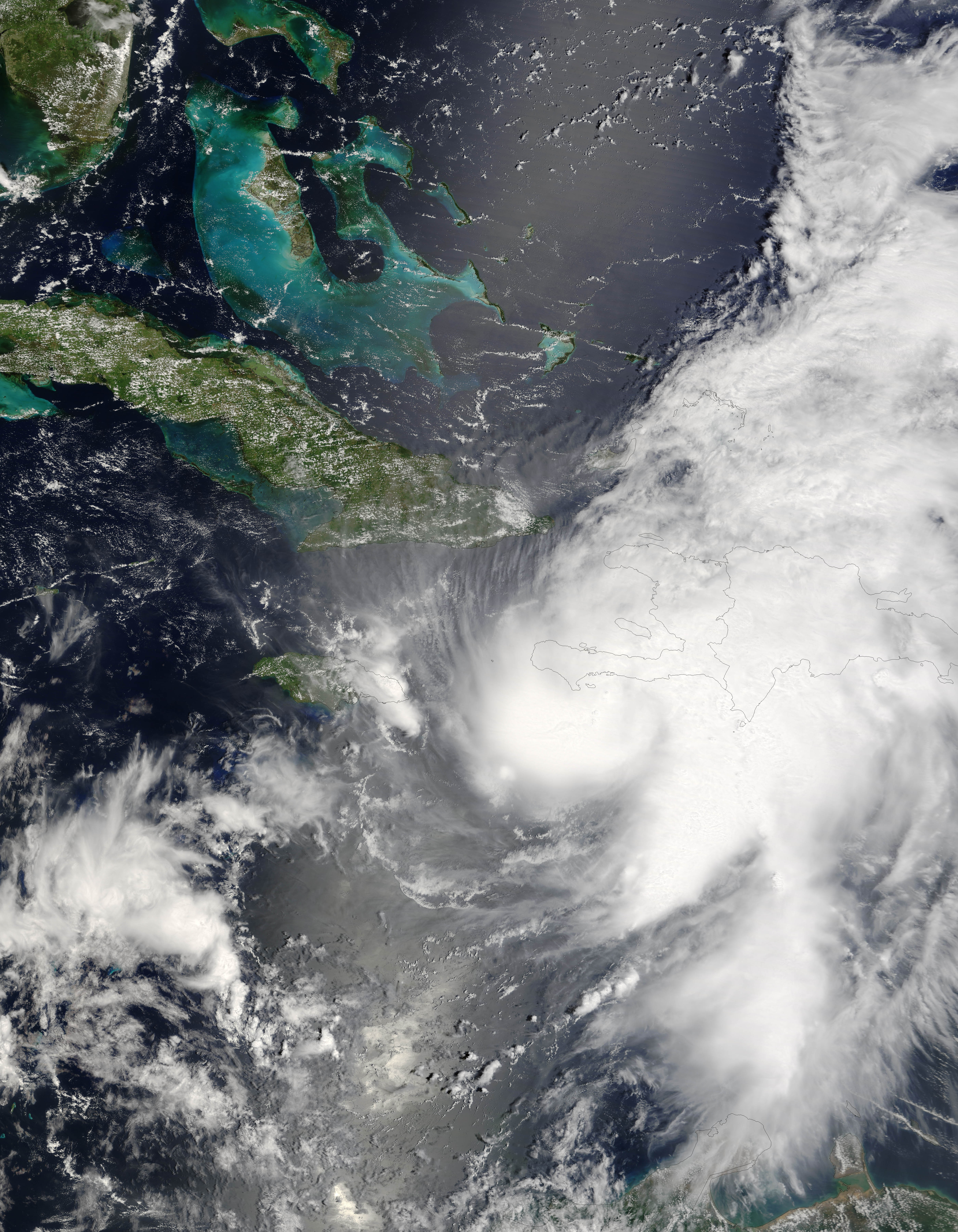
Hurricane Ernesto

August 27

- 2 a.m EDT (0600 UTC) – Tropical Storm Ernesto strengthens into Hurricane Ernesto.
- 8 a.m. EDT (1200 UTC) – Hurricane Ernesto weakens to a tropical storm.

August 28

- 7:15 a.m. EDT (1115 UTC) – Tropical Storm Ernesto makes a first landfall in Cuba at Playa Cazonal with 40 mph (64 km/h) winds.

August 29

- 11 p.m. EDT (0300 UTC) – Tropical Storm Ernesto makes a second landfall at Plantation Key, Florida, with 45 mph (72 km/h) winds.

August 30

- 1 a.m. EDT (0500 UTC) – Tropical Storm Ernesto makes a third landfall in southwestern Miami-Dade County, Florida with 45 mph (72 km/h).

August 31

- 11:40 p.m. EDT (0340 UTC September 1) – Tropical Storm Ernesto makes a fourth landfall at Oak Island, North Carolina, with 70 mph (110 km/h).

=== September ===
September 1

- 8 a.m. EDT (1200 UTC) – Tropical Storm Ernesto weakens to a tropical depression.
- 2 p.m. EDT (1800 UTC) – Tropical Depression Ernesto becomes extratropical.

September 3

- 2 p.m. AST (1800 UTC) – Tropical Depression Six forms 855 nautical miles (984 mi; 1,583 km) west of the Cape Verde Islands.

September 5

- 2 a.m. AST (0600 UTC) – Tropical Depression Six strengthens into Tropical Storm Florence.

September 10

- 2 a.m. AST (0600 UTC) – Tropical Storm Florence strengthens into Hurricane Florence.
- 2 p.m. EDT (1800 UTC) – Tropical Depression Seven forms 470 nautical miles (540 mi; 870 km) east-northeast of the Leeward Islands.

September 11

- 8 a.m. EDT (1200 UTC) – Tropical Depression Seven strengthens into Tropical Storm Gordon.

September 12

- 8 a.m. EDT (1200 UTC) – Tropical Depression Eight forms 200 nautical miles (230 mi; 370 km) south-southeast of the Cape Verde Islands.
- 8 p.m. AST (0000 UTC September 13) – Hurricane Florence becomes extratropical.
- 8 p.m. EDT (0000 UTC September 13) – Tropical Storm Gordon strengthens into Hurricane Gordon.

September 13

- 2 p.m. EDT (1800 UTC) – Hurricane Gordon reaches Category 2 intensity.
- 8 p.m. AST (0000 UTC September 14) – Hurricane Gordon reaches Category 3 intensity, becoming the first major hurricane of the season.
- 8 p.m. AST (0000 UTC September 14) – Tropical Depression Eight strengthens into Tropical Storm Helene.

September 16

- 8 a.m. AST (1200 UTC) – Tropical Storm Helene strengthens into Hurricane Helene.

Hurricane Helene

September 17

- 2 p.m. AST (1800 UTC) – Hurricane Helene reaches Category 2 intensity.
- 8 p.m. AST (0000 UTC September 18) – Hurricane Helene reaches to Category 3 intensity, becoming the second major hurricane of the season.

September 20

- 8 p.m. AST (0000 UTC September 21) – Hurricane Gordon becomes extratropical.

September 24

- 2 p.m. AST (1800 UTC) – Hurricane Helene becomes extratropical.

September 27

- 2 p.m. EDT (1800 UTC) – Tropical Depression Nine forms 810 nautical miles (930 mi; 1,500 km) east-southeast of Bermuda.

September 28

- 2 a.m. EDT (0600 UTC) – Tropical Depression Nine strengthens into Tropical Storm Isaac.

September 30

- 8 a.m. AST (1200 UTC) – Tropical Storm Isaac strengthens into Hurricane Isaac.

=== October ===
October 2

- 8 a.m. AST (1200 UTC) – Hurricane Isaac weakens to a tropical storm.
- 8 p.m. AST (0000 UTC October 3) – Tropical Storm Isaac becomes extratropical.

=== November ===
November 30

- The 2006 Atlantic hurricane season officially ends.

== See also ==
- Timeline of the 2006 Pacific hurricane season
- 2006 Pacific typhoon season
