= Hurricane Florence (2006) =

Category 1 Atlantic hurricane in 2006

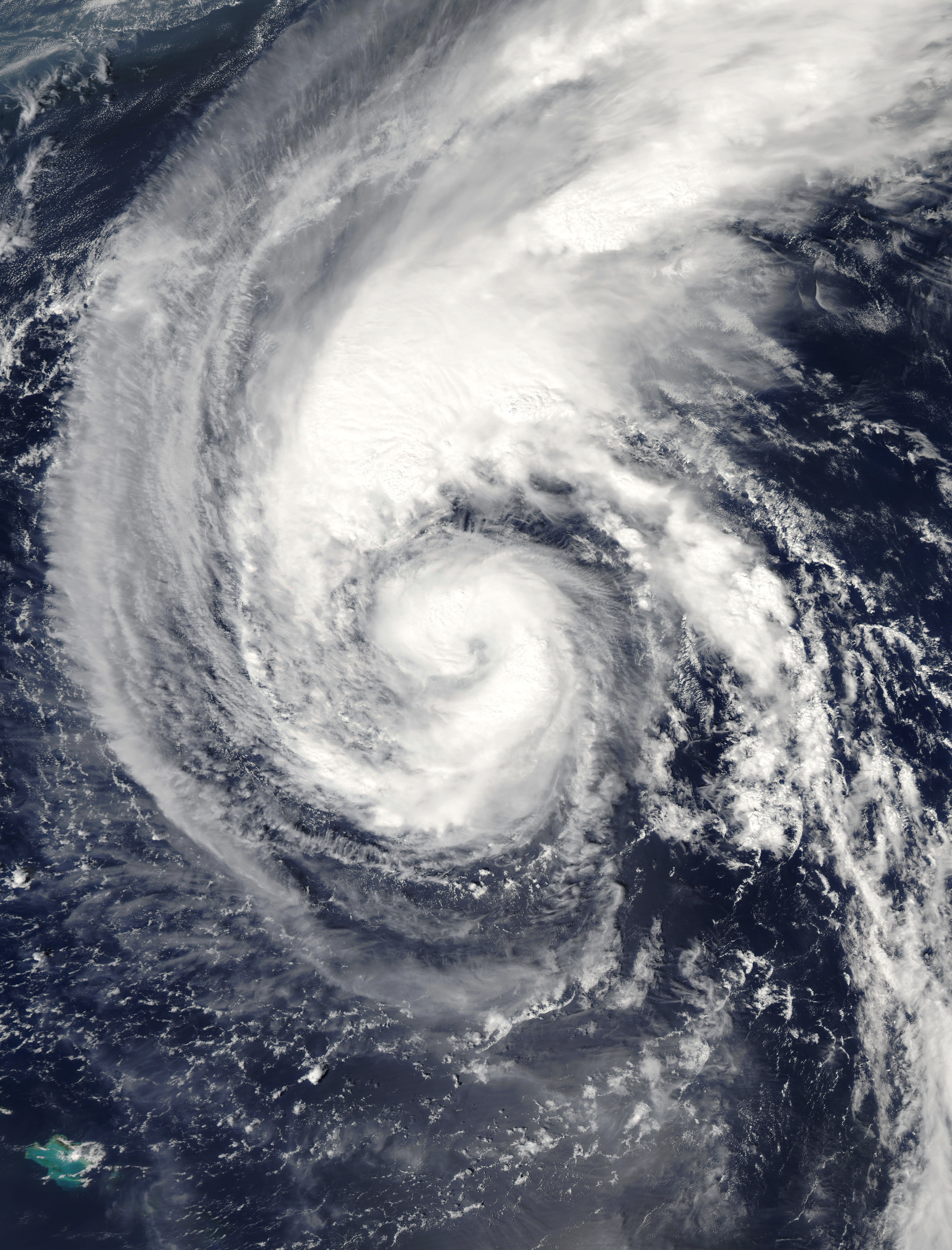
- Florence approaching Bermuda on September 10

Meteorological history
- Formed: September 3, 2006
- Extratropical: September 13, 2006
- Dissipated: September 19, 2006

Category 1 hurricane
- 1-minute sustained (SSHWS/NWS)
- Highest winds: 90 mph (150 km/h)
- Lowest pressure: 974 mbar (hPa); 28.76 inHg

Overall effects
- Fatalities: None
- Damage: $200,000 (2006 USD)
- Areas affected: Bermuda, Newfoundland, East Coast of the United States, Atlantic Canada, Iceland, Greenland
- IBTrACS
- Part of the 2006 Atlantic hurricane season

Hurricane Florence was the first North Atlantic hurricane to produce hurricane-force winds on the island of Bermuda since Hurricane Fabian in September 2003. The seventh tropical storm and second hurricane of the 2006 Atlantic hurricane season, Florence developed from a tropical wave in the eastern Atlantic Ocean on September 3. Due to unfavorable conditions, the system failed to organize initially, and as a result, the storm grew to an unusually large size. After several days, Florence encountered an area of lesser wind shear and intensified into a hurricane on September 10. It passed just west of Bermuda while recurving northeastward, and on September 13 it transitioned into an extratropical cyclone.

Florence produced wind gusts of up to 115 mph (185 km/h) on Bermuda, which caused several power outages and minor damage. Florence then brought heavy rains across Newfoundland as an extratropical storm, destroying one house and causing minor damage to several others. There were no fatalities as a result of the hurricane.

== Meteorological History ==
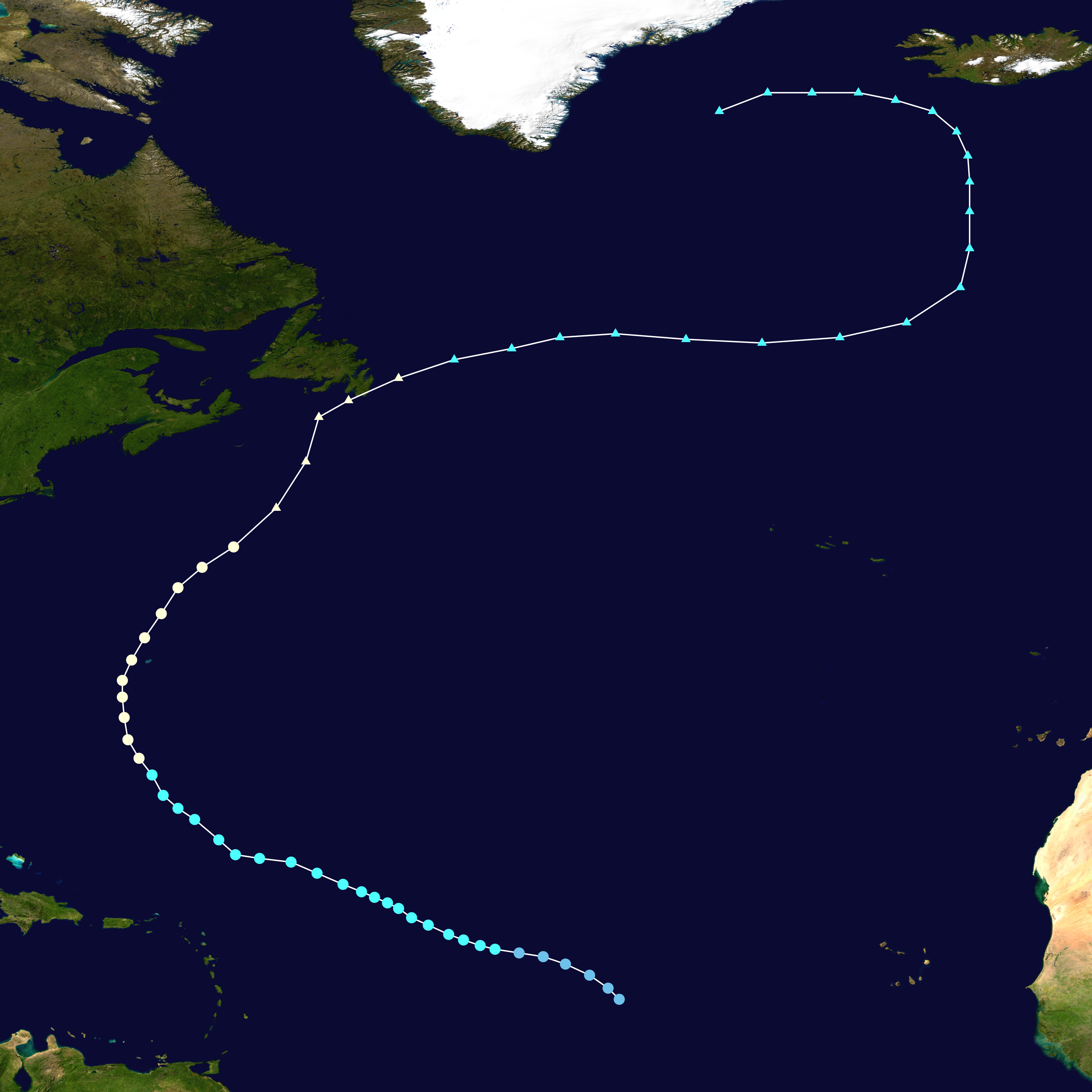
Map plotting the storm's track and intensity, according to the Saffir–Simpson scale Map key Saffir–Simpson scale Tropical depression (≤38 mph, ≤62 km/h) Tropical storm (39–73 mph, 63–118 km/h) Category 1 (74–95 mph, 119–153 km/h) Category 2 (96–110 mph, 154–177 km/h) Category 3 (111–129 mph, 178–208 km/h) Category 4 (130–156 mph, 209–251 km/h) Category 5 (≥157 mph, ≥252 km/h) Unknown Storm type Tropical cyclone Subtropical cyclone Extratropical cyclone, remnant low, tropical disturbance, or monsoon depression

A tropical wave moved off the coast of Africa on August 29. It tracked slowly westward, and first showed signs of development two days later. On August 31, a second tropical wave exited the coast of Africa at a faster speed than its predecessor. The two waves interacted, and by September 2 combined to form a large area of disturbed weather across the eastern Atlantic Ocean. Convection increased within the system, and it developed a concentrated area of convection in conjunction with a well-defined low pressure area. By late on September 3, the system maintained a broad closed circulation and enough convective organization to be classified Tropical Depression Six while located about midway between the Lesser Antilles and Africa.

Upon becoming a tropical cyclone, the depression maintained multiple cloud swirls within a common center. Banding features increased, though southwesterly wind shear and the lack of a well-defined circulation prevented initial strengthening. Dry air encountered the depression, and as such it developed very slowly; forecasters maintained considerable difficulty in determining a center of circulation. It continued its motion to the west-northwest while tracking around the southern periphery of a deep-layer subtropical ridge to its north. Though convection remained focused near the outer periphery of the system, the overall organized continued to steadily increase, and it is estimated the depression intensified into Tropical Storm Florence on September 5 while located about 1,120 miles (1,800 km) east-northeast of Anguilla.

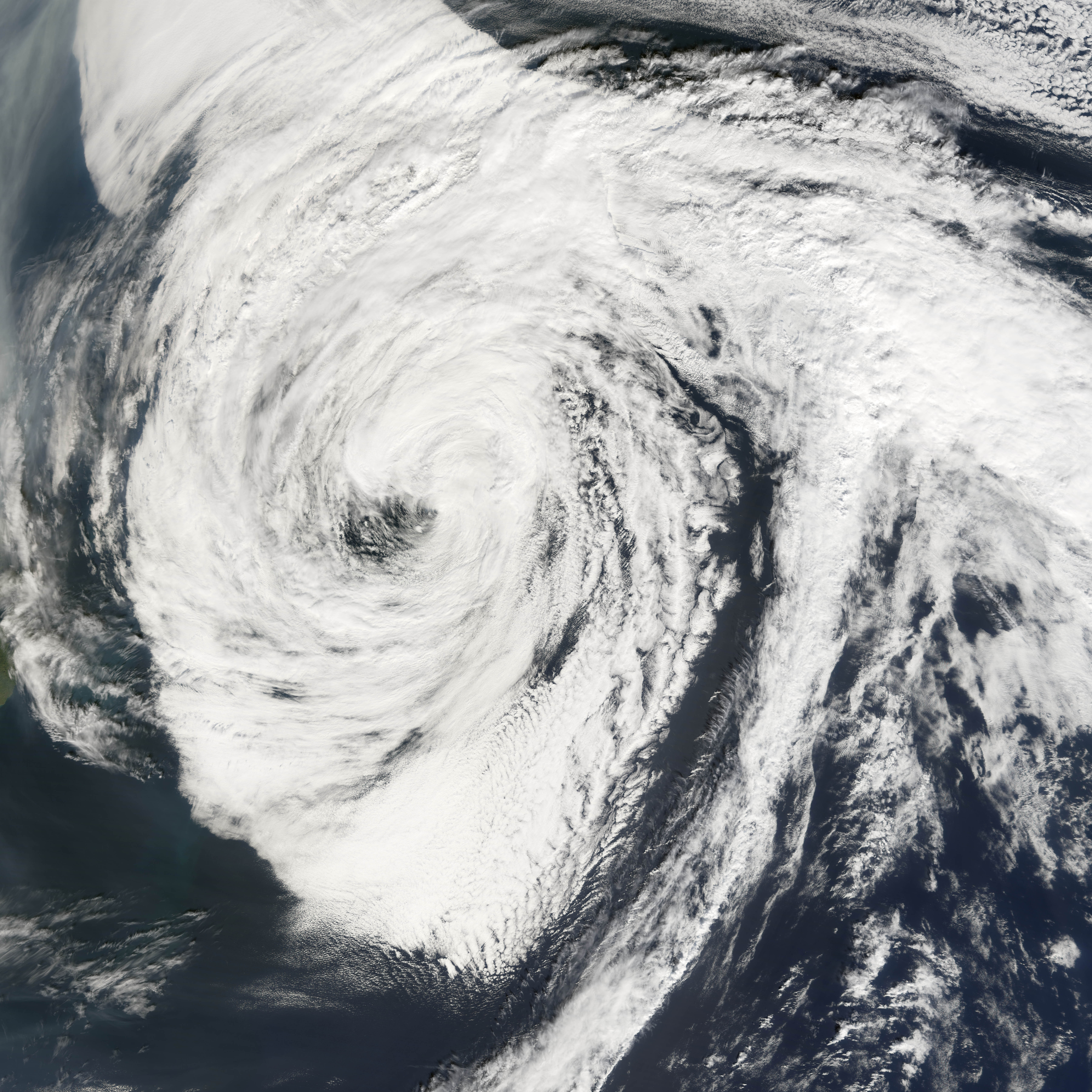
Florence after becoming an extratropical storm over the north Atlantic on September 14

After attaining tropical storm status, the maximum sustained winds fluctuated for three days between 40 and 50 mph (64 and 80 km/h). This was due to the large size of Florence; the overall wind field reached a diameter of 460 miles (740 km), and the radius of maximum winds reached about 110 miles (180 km). By September 6, a well-defined cloud swirl became evident, with thin rainbands developing in the southeast and northwest quadrants. As a result, hurricane forecasters anticipated Florence would develop significantly and attain major hurricane status. Though convection gradually migrated closer to the center of the storm, forecasters could not detect a well-defined center of circulation by late on September 6. On September 7, convection developed over and to the west of the center for the first time in its duration. However, Florence failed to intensify further, as its wind field had increased to more than 1,035 miles (1,666 km) in diameter. This led to difficulties in forecasting, as its environment favored further strengthening; the storm tracked through an area of 84° F (29° C) water temperatures and light shear, and the system maintained a large low-level cyclonic envelop with abundant convection. By early on September 8, the storm consisted of an elongated, shapeless cloud pattern atypical of a tropical cyclone. Later that day, as an anticyclone developed over Florence, the storm began to consolidate around a vorticity center on the western side of the large cyclonic envelope. It began to strengthen more steadily as it turned to the northwest. Early on September 10, an eye began developing within a round central dense overcast over the center, and shortly thereafter Florence attained hurricane status while located about 390 miles (630 km) south of Bermuda.

Hurricane Florence turned to the north and north-northeast through a break in the subtropical ridge. Though its eyewall was open on the north side, favorable conditions led forecasters to predict Florence passing near Bermuda as a strong Category 2 hurricane. The inner core of convection became ragged-looking on satellite imagery, and based on reports from Hurricane Hunters it is estimated the hurricane attained peak winds of 90 mph (140 km/h) late on September 10. Subsequent to further erosion of the eyewall, the hurricane weakened, and on September 11 passed about 60 miles (97 km) west of Bermuda with winds of 85 mph (137 km/h). The overall cloud pattern became slightly better organized, and Florence briefly re-strengthened before encountering increased upper-level winds and cooler waters. Dry air wrapping around the southern periphery of the cyclone eroded most of the deep convection by early on September 12. The cloud shield became asymmetrically displaced to the north of the center, and frontal-like features began to form. It continued to lose tropical characteristics, and on September 13 Florence transitioned into an extratropical cyclone about 485 miles (781 km) south-southwest of Cape Race, Newfoundland. Initially maintaining hurricane-force winds, the extratropical remnant passed near Cape Race before turning to the east-northeast, and on September 14 the winds weakened to gale force. The storm executed a broad cyclonic half-loop to the southwest of Iceland over the subsequent days, and after turning to the west the extratropical remnants of Florence were absorbed to the east of Greenland by a developing extratropical cyclone to its south.

== Preparations ==
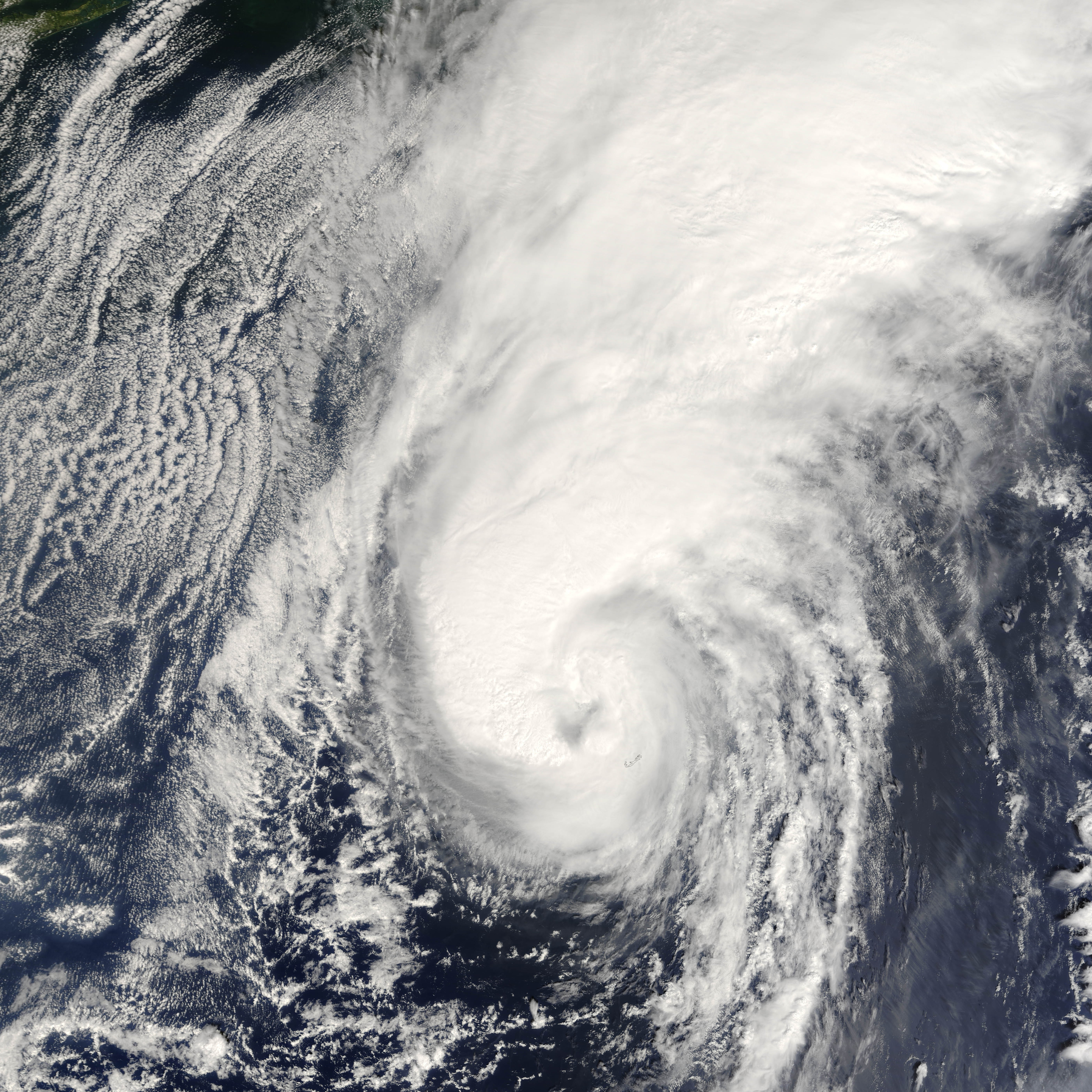
Hurricane Florence over Bermuda on September 11

The government of Bermuda issued a hurricane watch for the island on September 8, which was followed by a tropical storm warning on September 9. These were replaced by a hurricane warning on September 10, coinciding with the storm's strengthening to hurricane intensity. The government urged the potentially impacted citizens to take preparations for the storm, many of whom bought supplies at local hardware stores. Residents installed storm shutters, while boat owners moved their yachts to safer locations. An emergency shelter was prepared on the island. Prior to the arrival of the storm, officials canceled bus and ferry service, and also closed all schools and government offices on the day of impact. The Bermuda International Airport was also closed.

== Impact ==
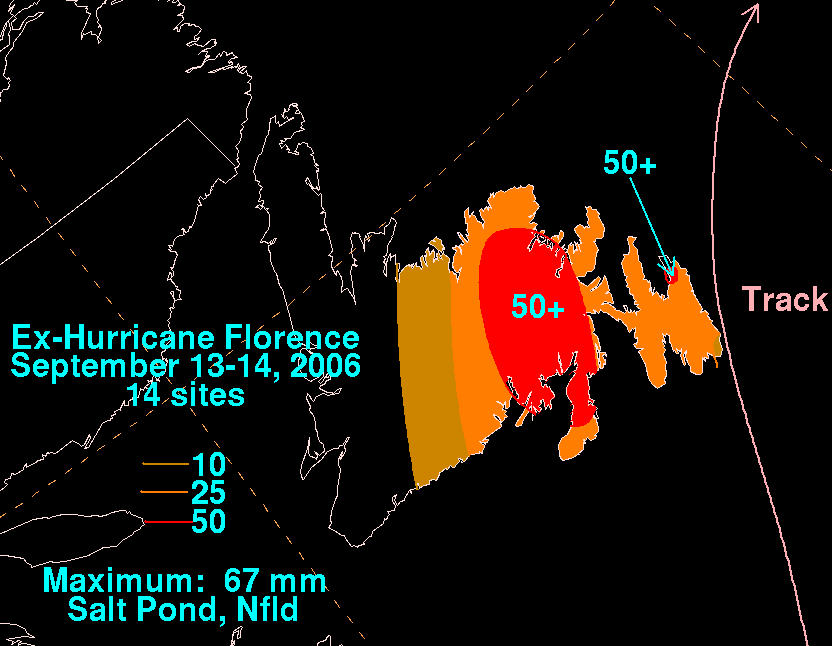
Rainfall totals for Florence in Newfoundland (in metric units) Imperial units

Hurricane Florence produced strong swells and dangerous surf conditions along the northern Lesser Antilles, Virgin Islands, Puerto Rico, Hispaniola, and Bermuda. Later in its duration, the tight pressure gradient between Florence and a high-pressure system over southeastern Canada produced strong winds and rough waves along the East Coast of the United States. The hurricane also caused strong swells and rough ocean conditions, including rip currents, in the Bahamas and Atlantic Canada. In South Carolina, high waves produced severe beach erosion on several beaches.

Passing a short distance west of Bermuda, Hurricane Florence produced strong winds on the island; sustained winds peaked at 82 mph (132 km/h) on St. David's Island at an elevation of 157 feet (48 m), while gusts reached 115 mph (185 km/h) at the Maritime Operations Centre in St. George's Parish at an elevation of 256 feet (78 m). The winds knocked down trees and power lines, leaving over 25,000 homes and businesses without electricity during the peak of the storm. The powerful winds damaged ten houses, including destroying the roofs of three, and blew out windows across the island. A few people were injured by flying glass, though none required hospital care. Rainfall on the island reached 1.32 inches (34 mm) at the Bermuda International Airport. A possible tornado in Southampton Parish downed trees and caused light property damage. At the Bermuda Zoo and Aquarium, two flamingos died due to falling branches. During the peak of the storm, police officials advised citizens to remain indoors away from harm, though there were several reports of looting throughout the territory. On the island, the storm's damage totaled over $200,000 (2006 USD). Shortly after the storm passed through, BELCO began restoring power, and by six hours after the peak of the storm power had been restored to 7,000 homes and businesses. By the day after the storm, about 3,000 remained without electricity on the island. The storm damaged the causeway between St. David's Island and Hamilton Parish, temporarily limiting traffic to one lane in each direction.

As an extratropical storm over Newfoundland, Florence produced powerful winds peaking at 101 mph (163 km/h) and moderate amounts of rainfall of up to 2.6 inches (66 mm). Flooding and power outages were reported, although they were isolated. The hurricane caused flight interruptions at St. John's International Airport and also to the Trans Canada ferry between Newfoundland and Cape Breton Island in eastern Nova Scotia. Strong winds destroyed a house in the small Newfoundland village of Francois. Residents in Francois agreed to rebuild the wrecked home while the family temporarily resided in a summer home of another family. The winds also caused damage to shingles and sides of homes, while the strong waves damaged roads and boats along the Burin Peninsula.

== See also ==
- List of Bermuda hurricanes
- Timeline of the 2006 Atlantic hurricane season
- Hurricane Maria (2011)
- Hurricane Leslie (2012)
