= C. H. Corn Hydroelectric Generating Station =

Hydroelectric dam in Florida, United States

Jackson Bluff Dam
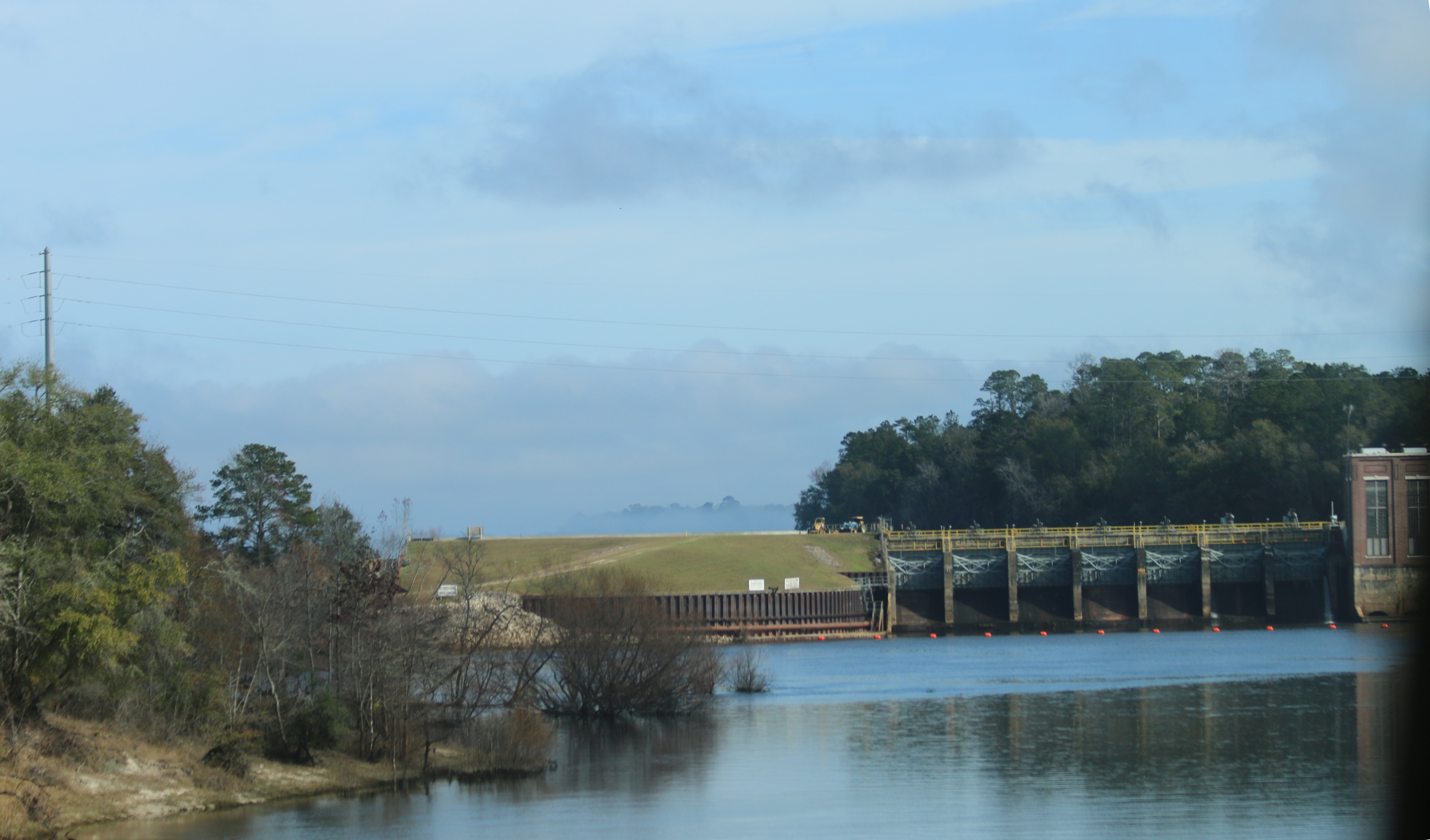
- Jackson Bluff Dam on Lake Talquin, site of C. H. Corn Hydroelectric Generating Station
- Interactive map of Jackson Bluff Dam
- Location: Leon County, Florida
- Coordinates: 30.38861310°N 84.64631981°W
- Purpose: Power
- Opening date: 1929

Dam and spillways
- Impounds: Ochlockonee River

Reservoir
- Creates: Lake Talquin

C. H. Corn Hydroelectric Generating Station
- Installed capacity: 12 MW

C. H. Corn Hydroelectric Generating Station is a hydroelectric dam on Lake Talquin and the Ochlockonee River in Leon County, Florida. Constructed in 1929 as the Jackson Bluff Dam by West Florida Power Company, the plant was operated until 1970 at which time the power plant was abandoned and the dam transferred to the Florida Department of Natural Resources, until 1981 at which point it was taken over by the City of Tallahassee and resumed operation in 1985.

The plant is one of only two hydroelectric plants in the state of Florida.

In 2017 the city proposed "mothballing" the power plant. State and federal officials have raised objections to this due to water flow for fish species. Among others Gulf sturgeon, Striped bass, and Alabama shad swim through the river, along with the only known population of Ochlockonee moccasinshell. Additionally, concerns over safety and flood mitigation have been raised by county and federal officials.
