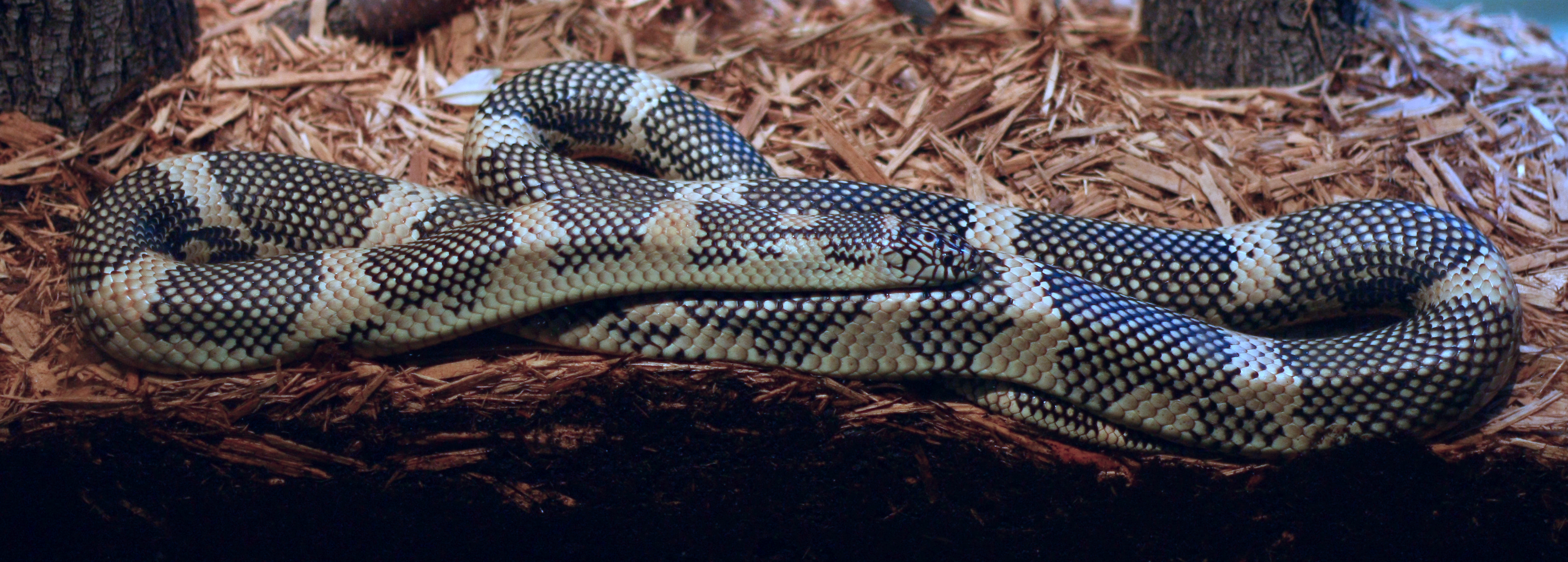
- Taken at Cincinnati Zoo.

Scientific classification
- Kingdom: Animalia
- Phylum: Chordata
- Class: Reptilia
- Order: Squamata
- Suborder: Serpentes
- Family: Colubridae
- Genus: Lampropeltis
- Species: L. getula
- Subspecies: L. g. meansi

Trinomial name
- Lampropeltis getula meansi Krysko & Judd, 2006

= Lampropeltis getula meansi =

Apalachicola Kingsnake

Subspecies of snake

The Apalachicola kingsnake (also known as the Eastern Apalachicola Lowlands kingsnake) is a species of nonvenomous colubrid snake found in a small area of the Florida Panhandle known as the Apalachicola Lowlands. Initially described as a subspecies by Krysko and Judd, 2006, the Eastern Apalachicola kingsnake is now recognized at the specific level as Lampropeltis meansi. After years of research by Dr. Kenneth L. Krysko, it was named for Dr. D. Bruce Means in recognition of his work on kingsnakes.

== Description ==
Adults can range from 30 to 56.1 inches. They are characterized by variable coloration patterns with an overall light dorsal coloration and wide or thin banding patterns. However, some striped and patternless specimens have also been identified. The ventral pattern is also variable; some with bicolored, loose checkerboard, or predominantly dark scales. They possess smooth scales and have 21 dorsal scale rows at mid-body.

== Geographic range ==
The Apalachicola kingsnake is endemic to Florida, and is only found in the panhandle between the Apalachicola River and Ochlokonee River and south of Telogia Creek. Morphological intermediates are found on both northern and southern ends of the range. These intermediates represent interbreeding between the Apalachicola kingsnake (L. g. meansi) and the eastern kingsnake (L. g getula).

== Habitat ==
Suitable habitat varies, but their range is quite small. Their habitat includes pinelands, hardwood hammocks, cypress strands, prairies, marshes, and estuaries.

== Diet ==
Their diet includes snakes, even venomous ones such as the rattlesnake, lizards, amphibians, rodents, birds, and turtle and bird eggs.

== Reproduction ==
Like other kingsnakes, they are oviparous, or egg-laying. Breeding takes place in March, April, and May, and after a month, three to 30 eggs are laid. The eggs hatch in late summer, 65 to 70 days after they have been laid. The hatchlings have an enormous appetite and grow quickly.

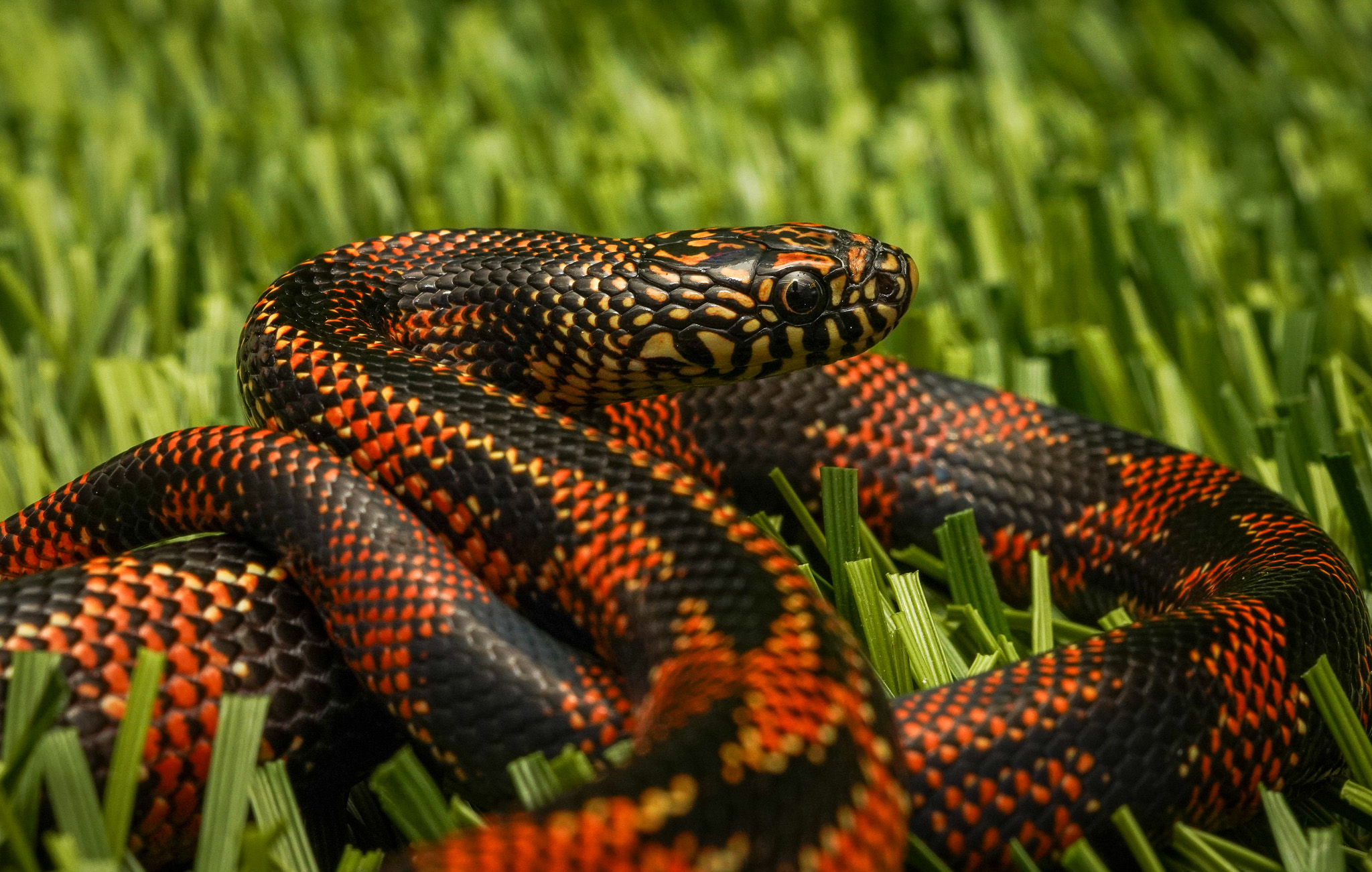
Hatchings are often born with a distinct red background coloring that dissipates as they mature.
