= Ochlockonee River =

River in Florida and Georgia, United States

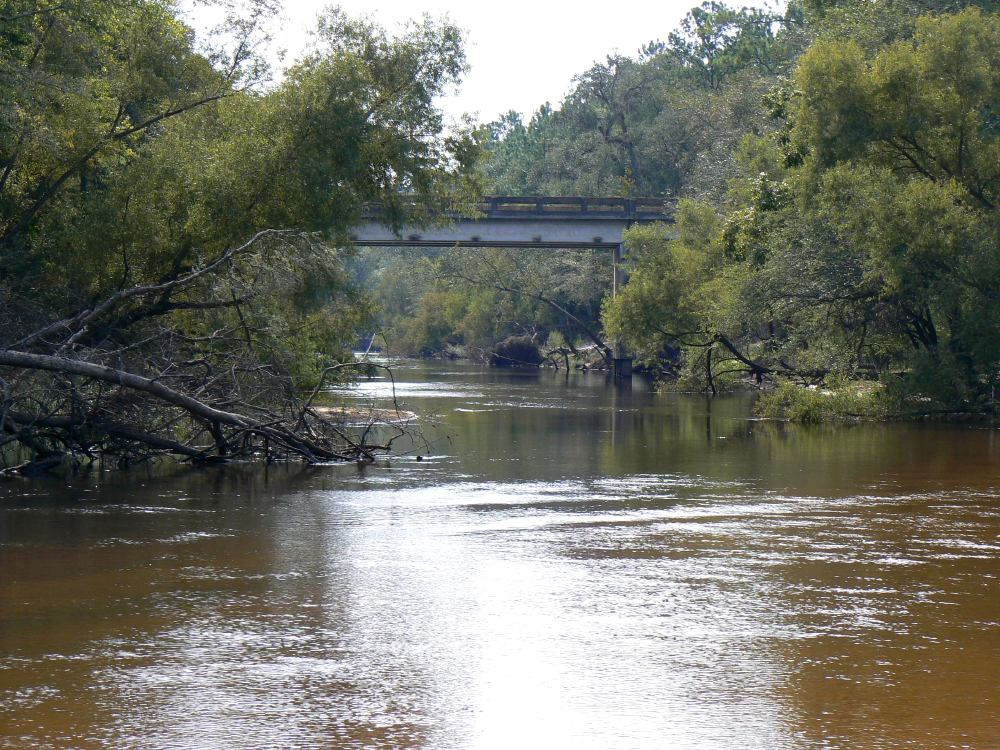
- Ochlockonee River at the Old Bainbridge Road Bridge

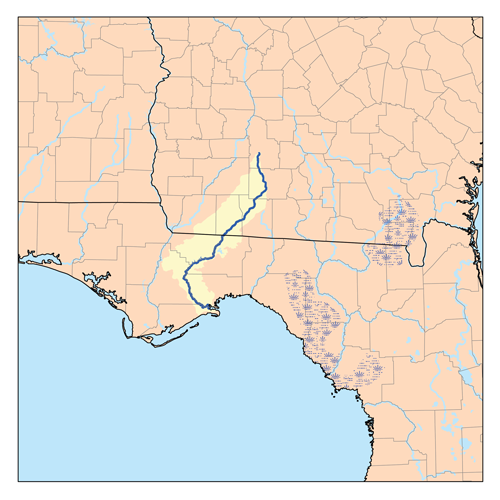
- Ochlockonee River watershed

Location
- Country: United States
- State: Georgia, Florida
- District: NWFWMD

Physical characteristics
- Source
  - location: Gordy, Georgia
  - coordinates: 31°29′06″N 83°52′49″W
- Mouth: Ochlockonee Bay
  - location: Surf, Florida
  - coordinates: 29°58′36″N 84°26′15″W
- Length: 206 mi (332 km)
- Basin size: 2,450 sq mi (6,300 km^{2})
- Discharge
  - location: Bloxham
  - average: 1,796 cu ft/s (50.9 m^{3}/s)

Basin features
- Tributaries
  - left: Sopchoppy River
  - right: Little River, Telogia Creek, Crooked River

The Ochlockonee River ( /oʊˈklɒknɪ/ o-KLOK-nee) is a fast-running river, except where it has been dammed to form Lake Talquin in Florida, originating in Georgia and flowing for 206 miles (332 km) before terminating in Florida.

== Background ==
The name is from the Hitchiti language words for yellow river. The Ochlockonee originates south of the town of Sylvester in Worth County in southwest Georgia and empties into Ochlockonee Bay and then Apalachee Bay in Florida.

The river forms the western boundaries of Leon County and Wakulla County and eastern boundaries of Gadsden County, Liberty County, and Franklin County in Florida. It flows through the Red Hills, the Jackson Bluff Dam, Talquin State Forest, Lake Talquin State Park and the Apalachicola National Forest, and past Ochlockonee River State Park, where it is tidally influenced and a mixture of fresh, brackish, and salt water, on the way to its terminus in Ochlockonee Bay, which then empties into Apalachee Bay, with tidal influences extending upstream over 15 miles (24 km) from the river's mouth.

== History ==
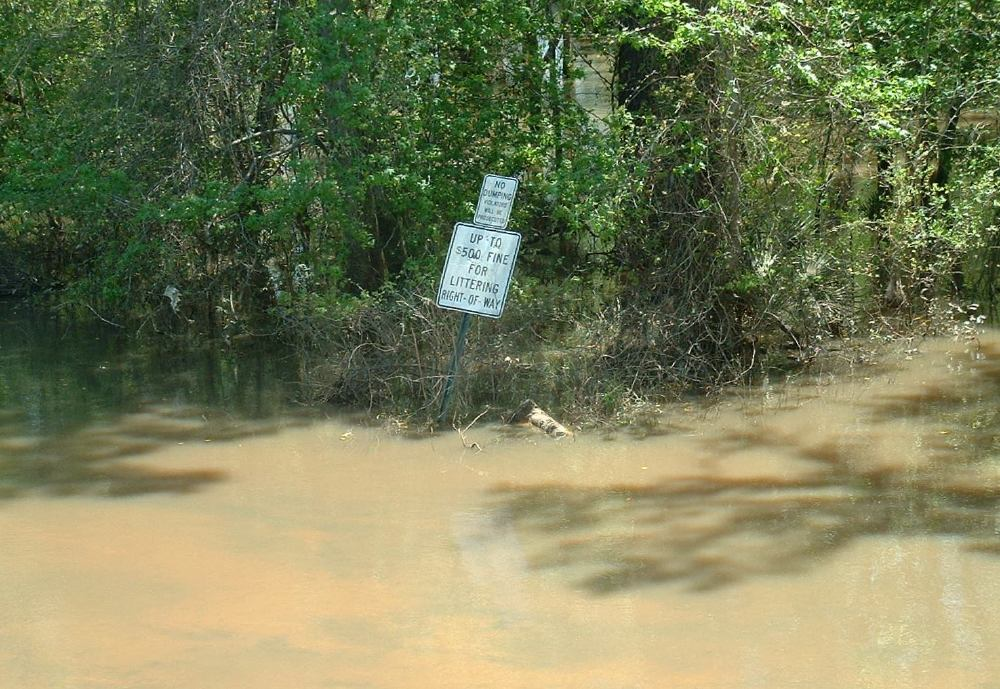
Ochlockonee flooding in Gadsden Co., Florida, near Fairbanks Ferry Road Bridge.

When the Spanish arrived in northern Florida, the Ochlockonee River formed the western boundary of their Apalachee Province. Late 17th-century Spanish documents refer to the river as Claraquachine (Note: The name may have been Apalachee or Chatot (both were Muskogean languages). The Chine (as in Claraquachine) people, who moved into Apalachee Province during the 17th century, may have been a branch of the Chatot.) and Amarillo (Spanish for "yellow"). A 1716 Spanish document called it Rio de Lagna (lagna is probably Apalachee for "yellow"). An English map from 1720 identifies it as the Yellow River. A 1778 map spells the river's name "Okalockney", while one from 1856 has it as "Oklokonee". The modern name probably derives from the Hitchiti/Mikasuki Oki (water) and Lagana (yellow).

From 1839 to 1842, Fort Virginia Braden was established on the river located at Fort Braden in Florida. The fort was named after the commander's wife who died of yellow fever.

=== The Civil War ===
The Ochlockonee River saw action during the Civil War. On 15 July 1863, the screw steamer gunboat USS Stars and Stripes and wooden side-wheel steam ferryboat USS Somerset attacked the salt works at Mashes Sands. On 29 December 1863, Stars and Stripes sank the blockade-running schooner Caroline Gertrude, aground on the sandbar at the mouth of the Ochlockonee. Stars and Stripes also captured the blockade-running steamer Laura off the Ochlockonee on 18 January 1864. On 19 and 20 October 1864, Stars and Stripes destroyed an extensive Confederate fishery at Mashes Island and captured the troops stationed there as guards.

=== Jackson Bluff Dam ===
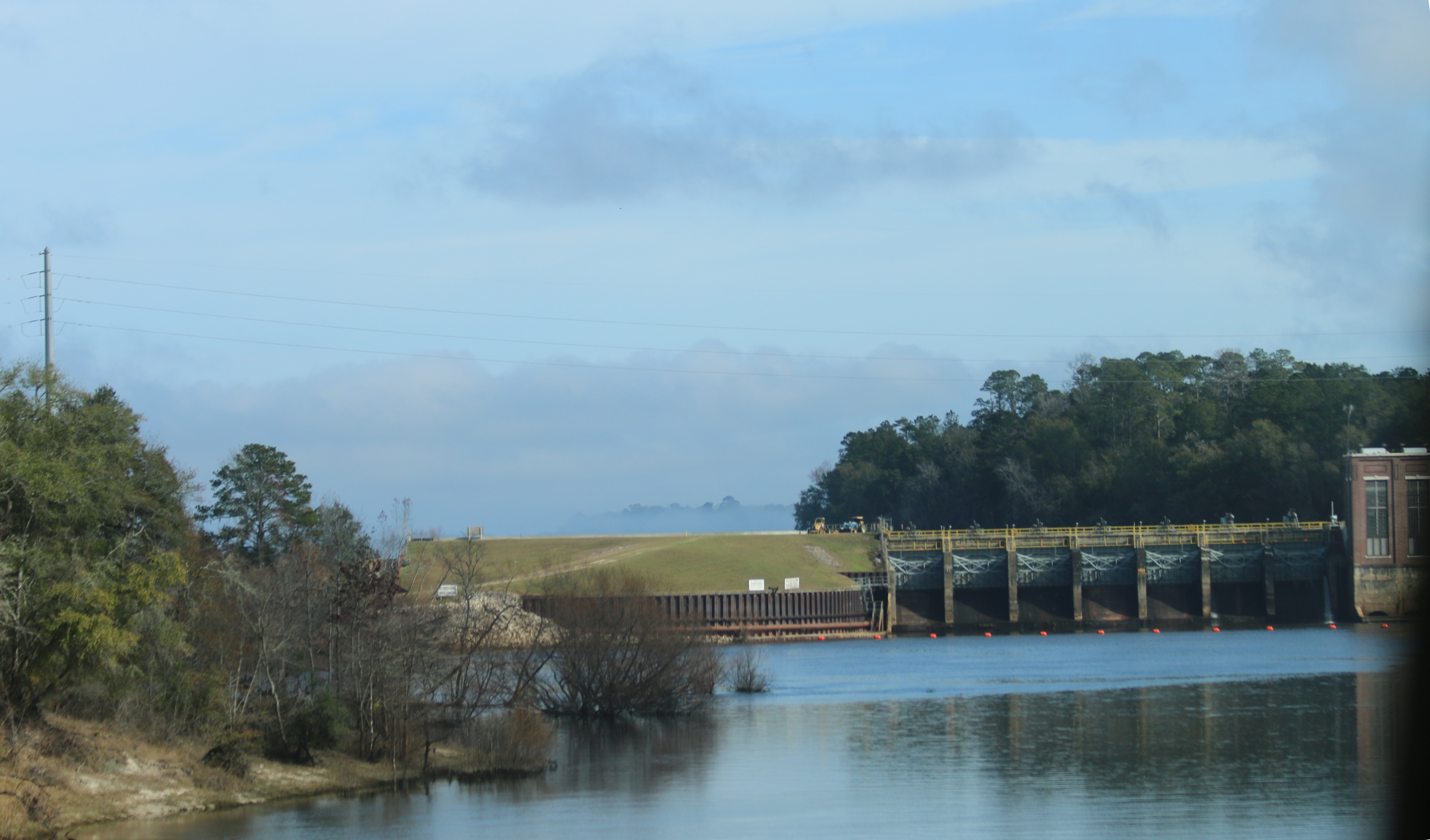
Jackson Bluff Dam

In 1927 the Jackson Bluff Dam was constructed on the Ochlockonee River to produce hydroelectric power. The waters held back by the dam formed Lake Talquin.

== Importance ==
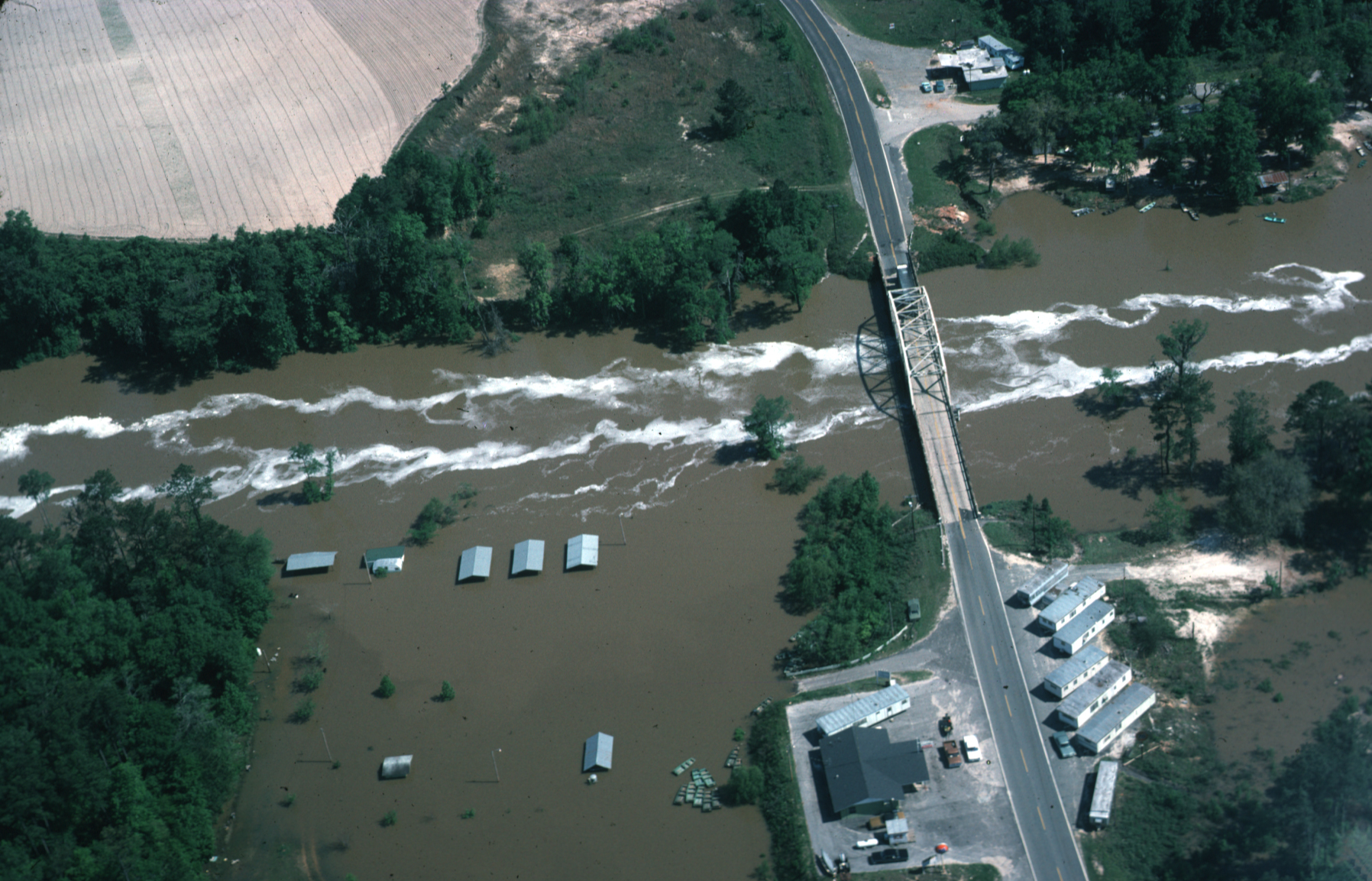
Aerial view of the flooded Ochlockonee River on April 16, 1975 near Bloxham, just southwest of the modern State Highway 20 bridge crossing and the Talquin Dam.

The Ochlockonee River corridor is home to many threatened fish, wildlife and plant species. It has been designated under the State of Florida's Outstanding Florida Waters program and has been identified by the Florida Fish and Wildlife Conservation Commission as a Strategic Habitat Conservation Area.

Rare animals that can be found along the Ochlockonee include red-cockaded woodpecker, least tern, and the Apalachicola dusky salamander. The river is especially rich in rare freshwater mussels (Unionidae), including three federally listed endangered species: the Ochlockonee moccasinshell, the Shinyrayed pocketbook, and the Oval pigtoe. "The Florida maybell tree can be found only along the Ochlockonee and Chipola Rivers.

The Ochlockonee is connected to and a source of water for Lake Iamonia, especially during flooding.

The Ochlockonee River's mouth serves as a breakpoint for the National Hurricane Center when issuing tropical cyclone warnings and watches.

== Recreation ==
Fishing for largemouth bass, black crappie, Bream, striped bass and channel catfish can be excellent on the Ochlockonee River, and a state-designated canoe trail can be found both upstream and downstream of Lake Talquin. Telogia Creek and the Little River near State Road 12 are also popular for canoeing. The Florida National Scenic Trail follows the river for two miles.

The Ochlockonee is a vital link in the production of seafood in Apalachee Bay. During floods, the river transports organic matter downstream into the estuary of Ochlockonee Bay where the shallows of the bay were created by the great volume of sand and clay brought down by the river. This estuary serves as a nursery for numerous species of fish and shellfish which are the basis for recreational and commercial fishing as well as the seafood that this area is known for. Fishing on the Ochlockonee Bay is excellent for Flounder, Redfish, Black Drum, Spotted Sea Trout, Blue Crab and sharks.

== Crossings ==
A number of major highways cross the Ochlockonee River along its course, including Interstate 10 and U.S. highways 19, 27, U.S. Route 84 and 319.

Crossing	Carries	Image	Location	Coordinates
=== Georgia ===
	Brooks Road			31.4004°N 83.8923°W
	Bridgeboro-Anderson Road			31.3943°N 83.8945°W
	Liberty Hill Road			31.3724°N 83.8969°W
	Childree Road			31.3501°N 83.8919°W
	Evergreen Road			31.3353°N 83.8835°W
	SR 270		Doerun	31.3194°N 83.8791°W
	Hagin Still Road			31.2990°N 83.8733°W
	Swift Canteen Road			31.2671°N 83.8424°W
	SR 133		Sigsbee	31.2471°N 83.8340°W
Rail bridge	Norfolk Southern Railway; Line formerly known as the Georgia Northern Railway			31.2471°N 83.8340°W
	Old Doerun Rd		Moultrie	31.2295°N 83.8349°W
	SR 37		Moultrie	31.1826°N 83.8091°W
	Lower Meigs Road		Moultrie	31.1421°N 83.8032°W
	Fred Webb Road			31.1056°N 83.8331°W
Smithwick Bridge	Smithwick Bridge Road			31.0692°N 83.8716°W
Rocky Ford Bridge	Zion Grove Church Road			31.0692°N 83.8716°W
	Bannister Road			31.0396°N 83.9189°W
	Beeline Road Road			31.0336°N 83.9356°W
	SR 188			31.0024°N 83.9390°W
	SR 202			30.9502°N 83.9622°W
Old Confederate Bridge	Egg-Butter Road (Defunct)		Dawesville	30.9287°N 83.9967°W
	US 19 / SR 300		Dawesville	30.9287°N 83.9967°W
Rail bridge	CSX; Line formerly known as the South Georgia and Florida Railroad		Dawesville	30.9173°N 84.0049°W
	SR 3		Dawesville	30.9121°N 84.0086°W
	US 84 / SR 38			30.8758°N 84.0464°W
Rail bridge	CSX; Line formerly known as the Atlantic and Gulf Railroad			30.8758°N 84.0464°W
	SR 93		Cairo	30.7917°N 84.1543°W
Hadley Ferry Bridge	CR 54; Hadley Ferry Road		Rocky Hill	30.7316°N 84.2356°W
Old Hadley Ferry Bridge	(Defunct)		Rocky Hill	30.731444°N 84.236319°W
=== Florida ===
Fairbanks Ferry/Bridge	CR 12		Concord	30.6690°N 84.3050°W
	CR 0361; CR 157		Tallahassee	30.5895°N 84.3601°W
	US 27		Tallahassee	30.5541°N 84.3840°W
Rail bridge	CSX; Line formerly known as the Georgia, Florida and Alabama Railway.		Tallahassee	30.5505°N 84.3875°W
	I-10		Midway	30.4852°N 84.3972°W
	US 90		Midway	30.4734°N 84.4073°W
Rail bridge	CSX; Line formerly known as the Pensacola and Georgia Railroad		Midway	30.4730°N 84.4080°W
Talquin Dam			Bloxham	30.3884°N 84.6464°W
	SR 20 / SR 267		Bloxham	30°23′05.6″N 84°39′09.4″W
	Former SR 20 Bridge (Defunct)		Bloxham	30.3837°N 84.6551°W
	CR 368; Forest Highway 13		Porter Lake	30.1767°N 84.6684°W
Rail bridge	Georgia, Florida and Alabama Railway (Defunct)		McIntyre	30.1767°N 84.6684°W
E.R.L. Moore Bridge	US 319		Sopchoppy	29.9881°N 84.5022°W
Ochlockonee Bay Bridge (a/k/a Walker Bridge)	US 98		Ochlockonee Bay	29.9682°N 84.3840°W

== See also ==
- South Atlantic-Gulf Water Resource Region
