= Lake Talquin =

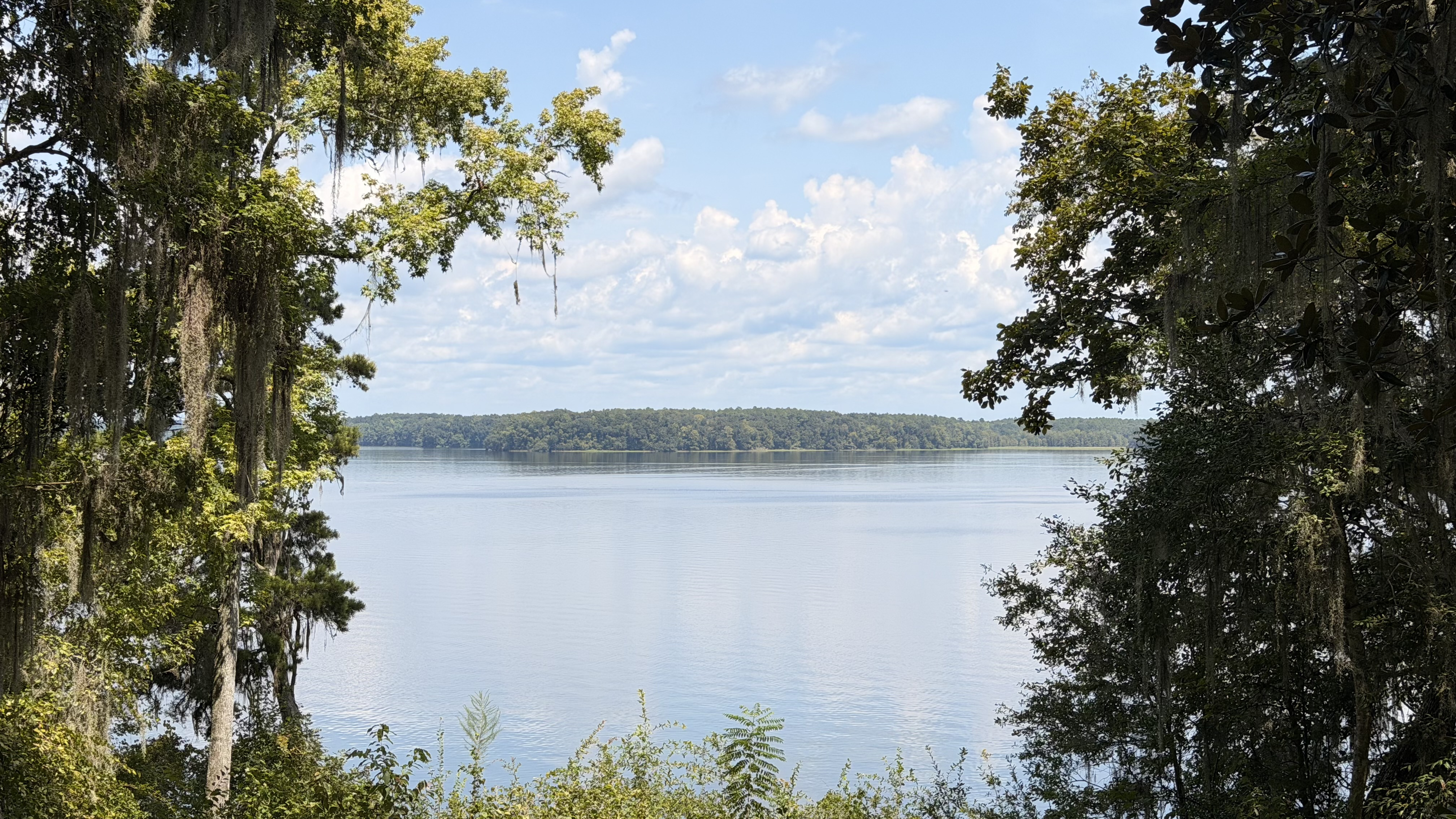
- viewed from Lake Talquin State Park

- Location within Florida Location within the United States
- Location: Gadsden / Leon counties, Florida, United States
- Coordinates: 30°23′19″N 84°38′48″W
- Type: reservoir
- Primary inflows: Ochlockonee River
- Primary outflows: Ochlockonee River
- Basin countries: United States

Lake Talquin is a reservoir located on the Ochlockonee River between Leon County and Gadsden County in north Florida. The lake, located about 10 miles (15 km) west of Tallahassee, is south of Interstate 10 and bordered by State Road 20 on the east and State Road 267 on the west.

The lake was created by the construction of the C. H. Corn Hydroelectric Generating Station, and used for the generation of hydroelectric power. The name Talquin is a contraction of the names of the two cities the lake lies between, Tallahassee and Quincy.

Lake Talquin State Forest includes several tracts of land along the lake's shoreline.

== History ==
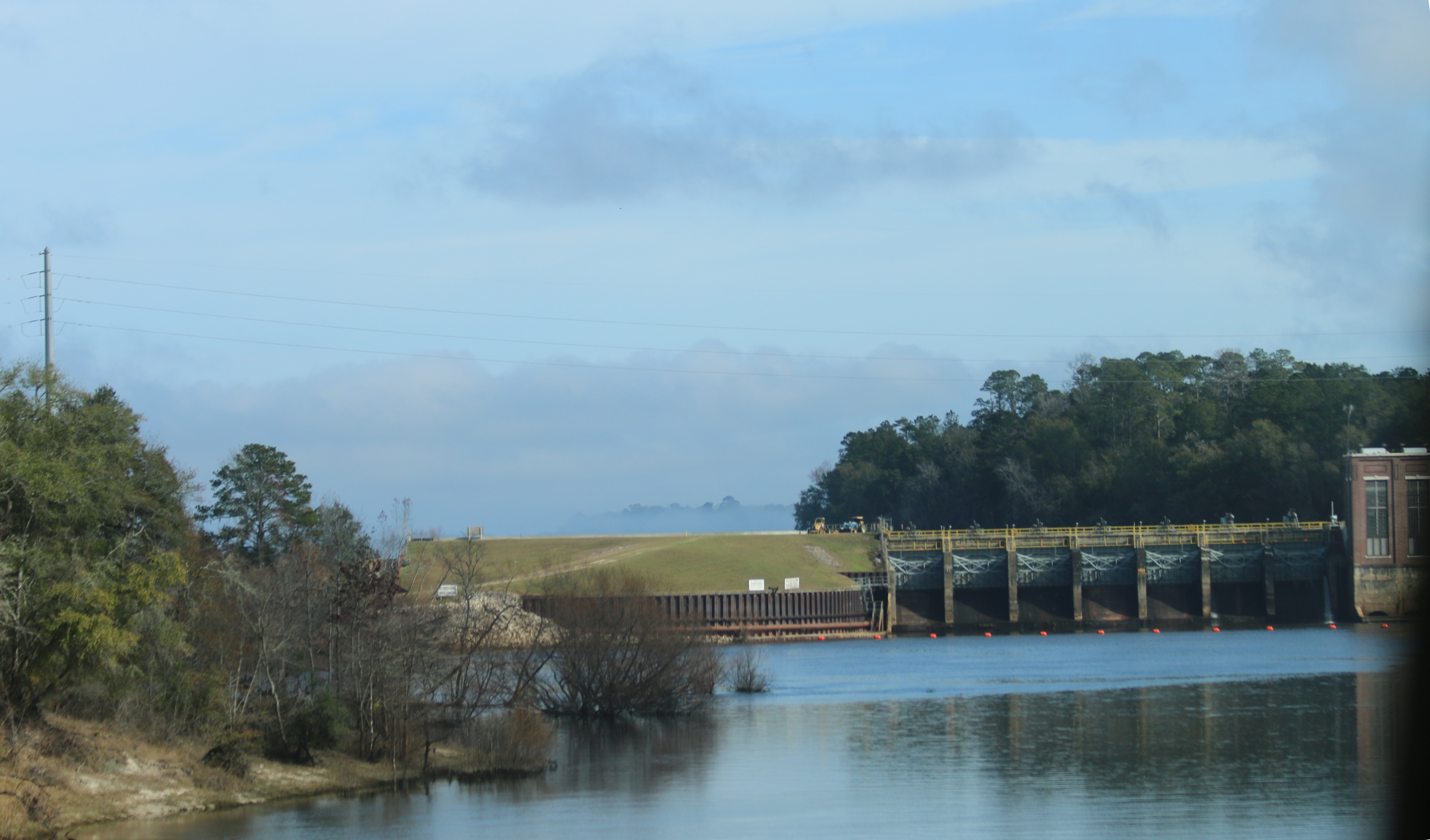
The Talquin Dam

In 1927 the Jackson Bluff Dam was constructed on the Ochlockonee River to produce hydroelectric power. The waters held back by the dam formed Lake Talquin. The dam was constructed by the Florida Power Corporation which operated the dam's hydroelectric plant through 1970. A 60 foot (18 m) earthen dam, it is one of only two hydroelectric power plants in the state of Florida.

In 1970, approximately 20,000 acres (80 km^{2}) of uplands and 10,000 acres (40 km^{2}) of lake bottom were donated by Florida Power to the State of Florida to form Lake Talquin State Recreation Area, now Lake Talquin State Park, and Florida Power handed over the dam's ownership to the State of Florida; the City of Tallahassee acquired the lease to generate electricity at the dam in 1978 and in 1986 refurbished the powerplant to resume generation. In 2017, Tallahassee announced they would not be renewing their lease when it expired in 2022, choosing instead to focus on solar power.

=== Incidents ===
On September 30, 1957, the dam suffered a failure due to the lake being overfilled. On August 18, 1962, the lake was the site of a tragedy when 17 children and one adult drowned in the capsizing of a boat while they were on an outing. In 2008 and 2009, releases of water from the dam to prevent a potential failure caused downstream flooding.

== Topography ==
Rolling hills and deep ravines surround the lake. The water level is usually at the 70 feet (21 m) contour (70 feet above sea level), but it can vary by as much as 3 feet (0.91 m). The lake's nominal surface area is about 10,000 acres (40 km^{2}), or about 15 square miles, but because of the shallow gradient in some of the inlets and the seasonal variations in water level, it is not possible to state a more precise figure for the size of the lake.

The lake's shoreline measures more than 40 miles (64 km), and considerably more if one includes all of the nooks and crannies of the numerous inlets. Most of this shoreline is public land, and is therefore undeveloped.

Most of the lake measures approximately 1 mile (1.6 km) in width. The total length of the lake is almost 20 miles (32 km) (depending on where one decides the river ends and the lake begins).

Much of the shore of the lake is now part of Lake Talquin State Forest. The waters that now cover Lake Talquin's floodplain are shallow except along the old channel of the river. The abundance of dead trees and stumps scattered about are reminders of the rich floodplain forest that once covered the area before the lake was formed. Most of the stumps can be found right under the water on the eastern end of the lake causing problems for boaters.

== Wildlife and vegetation ==
Eastern gray squirrels, fox squirrels, wild turkey, bald eagles, ospreys, alligators and whitetail deer are found in the forests surrounding the lake. Also commonly seen are egrets, blue herons, water turtles of several varieties, and water snakes, including water moccasins. Insect life is abundant, and mosquitoes and chiggers in particular can be troublesome during the summer months.

The area has forests of pines and hardwoods including sweetgum and a variety of oaks.

== Recreation ==
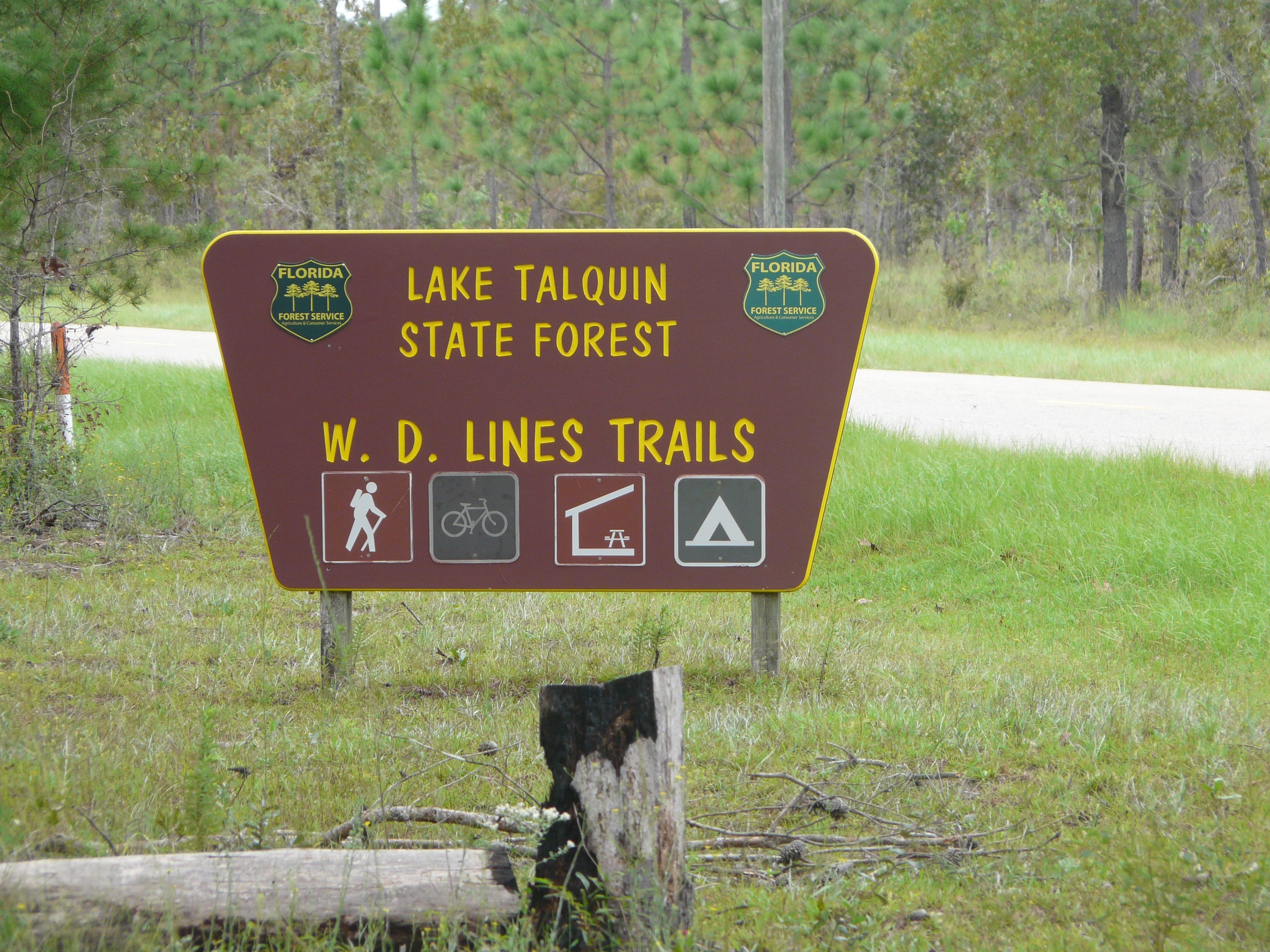
Entrance sign in the Lines Tract in Gadsden County.

Lake Talquin State Forest encompasses much of the southern and southwestern shores of the lake, with many boat landings and picnic areas, including Rock Bluff Recreation Area in Leon County. There are facilities for private picnics, parties, family reunions, weddings and receptions.

The lake is also home to the Florida State University Crew Club, a rowing club.

=== Fishing ===
Lake Talquin has largemouth and striped bass, crappie, bream, pickerel (commonly called "jack"), gar, catfish, and bowfin.

== Fire suppression ==
Lake Talquin Volunteer Fire Department provides fire protection services to the rural area around Lake Talquin with assistance from the Tallahassee Fire Department.
