= Lake Talquin State Park =

State park in Leon County, Florida, United States

- IUCN category IV (habitat/species management area)
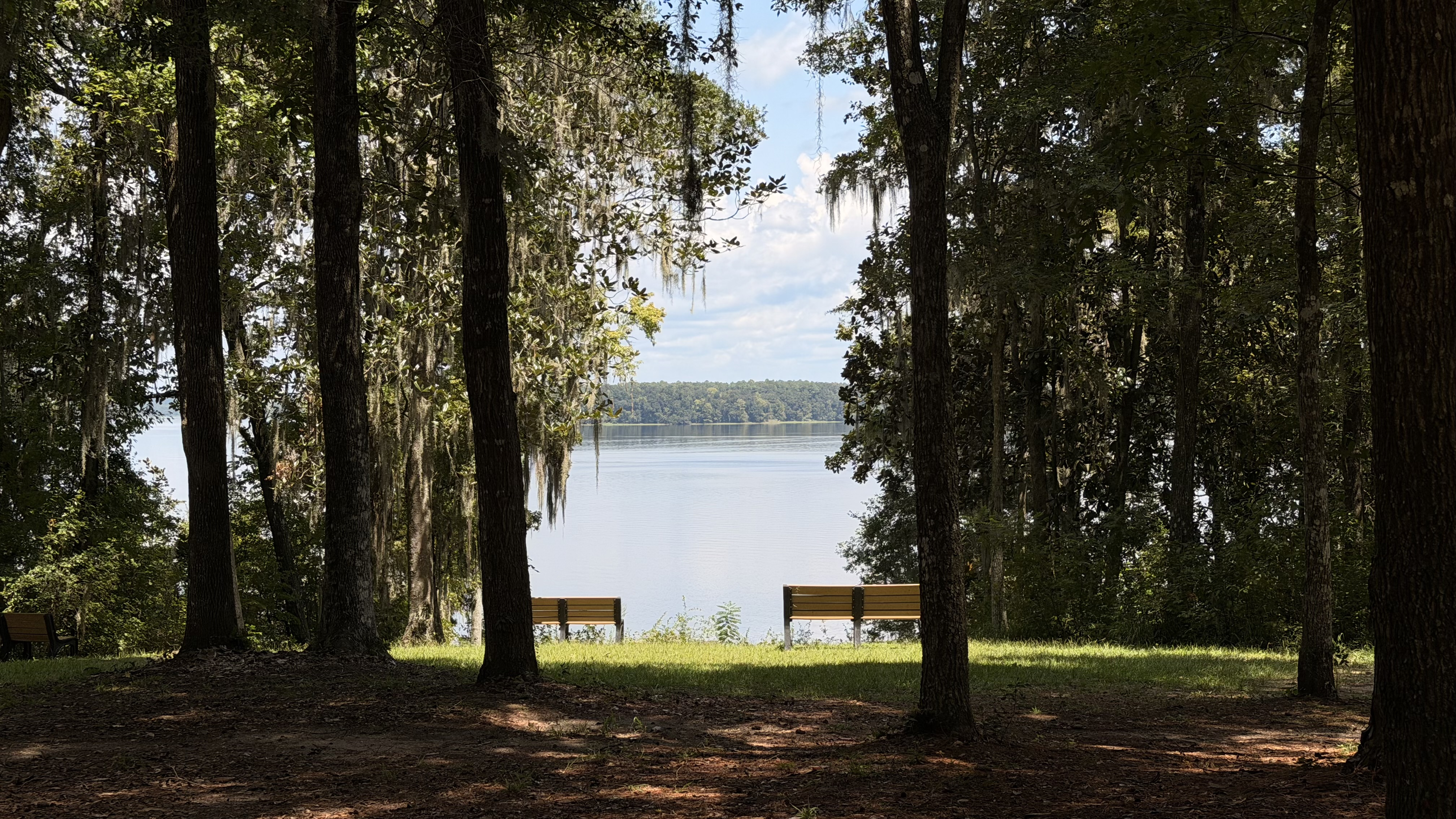
- A view of Lake Talquin from the park

- Location within Florida Location within the United States
- Interactive map of Lake Talquin State Park
- Location: Leon County, Florida, U.S.
- Nearest city: Tallahassee
- Coordinates: 30.4365°N 84.5301°W
- Area: 425.78 acres (172.31 ha)
- Established: December 15, 1970; 56 years ago
- Visitors: 11,835 (in FY 2018-2019)
- Governing body: Florida Department of Environmental Protection Division of Recreation and Parks

Lake Talquin State Park is a Florida state park in Leon County, about 15 miles (24 km) west of Tallahassee. The park is situated just south of Lake Talquin near the Fort Braden community. The park covers 425.78 acres (172.31 ha) and its accessible from State Road 20 via Jack Vause Landing Road. The park is administered by the Florida Park Service (FPS).

The land was donated to the State of Florida by the Florida Power Corporation in December 1970 and leased to FPS the following June under a 99-year lease. The recreation of the modern park was adapted from the former Lake Talquin State Recreation Area, which once exceeded 20,000 acres; most of the surrounding uplands were transferred to the Florida Division of Forestry, now the Florida Forest Service, which today makes up the Lake Talquin State Forest.

The park protects a stretch of high bluff and steep ravines above Lake Talquin, a 12,000-acre (4,900 ha) reservoir formed in 1927 when the Ochlockonee River was dammed at the Jackson Bluff for hydroelectric power. Most of the park's acreage is covered by slope forest and upland-hardwood forest, with smaller areas of sandhill and seepage stream. All the waters in the park are designated as Outstanding Florida Waters. Day-use facilities include a picnic pavilion, a 650-foot (200 m) boardwalk with an observation deck over the lake, a boat ramp, and about 1.68 miles (2.70 km) of nature trails. Visitors to the park can participate in activities such as hiking, birding, freshwater fishing, canoeing, and kayaking.

== History ==
=== Lake Talquin and the Jackson Bluff dam ===
Lake Talquin was created by damming the Ochlockonee River at Jackson Bluff, an erosional escarpment located on the river's eastern bank in western Leon County, to generate hydroelectric power. The lake takes its name from the two cities between which it lies: Tallahassee and Quincy. The unit management plan (UMP) and park documentation date the reservoir's creation to 1927, whereas the City of Tallahassee, who later managed the plant, cites 1929 as the year when the West Florida Power Company built the dam and power station. West Florida Power became part of the Florida Power Corporation, who would continue to operated the plant until 1970.

The dam consists of an earthen embankment approximately 4,575 feet (1,394 m) long and up to about 60 feet (18 m) high. It features a spillway equipped with seven gates and a brick powerhouse housing three generating units. The reservoir has a typical water level of 68.5 feet (20.9 m) above sea level and covers an area of approximately 10,200 acres (4,100 ha). (Note: The 2020 UMP describes Lake Talquin as a 12,000 acres (4,900 ha) reservoir extending 14.5 miles (23.3 km) along the Ochlockonee River floodplain, and the park brochure describes it as an "approximately 10,000-acre lake." The figure used here corresponds to the water surface area at its normal level, as stated in the federal environmental assessment for the hydroelectric project.) During the period of Florida Power's ownership, the company leased the land to the St. Joe Timberland Company, which conducted logging operations. The park's UMP suggests that the longleaf pine was likely much more widespread on the property prior to that logging activity. A 1938 aerial photograph shows areas of clear-cutting or possible cultivated fields in two sectors of what is now the park, while the rest of the area appears to have remained relatively undisturbed.

== Ecology ==
The upland forests include loblolly pine, American beech, southern magnolia, sweetgum, red maple and oaks. Flowering dogwood, redbud and red buckeye grow in the understory, while the steephead ravines provide moist habitats along the lake.
