= Telogia Creek =

River in the United States of America

Telogia Creek Tologic River
- Location within Florida Location within the United States

Location
- Country: United States
- State: Florida
- Counties: Gadsden; Liberty

Physical characteristics
- Source
  - coordinates: 30°38′41″N 84°41′06″W
- Mouth: Ochlockonee River
  - coordinates: 30°16′06″N 84°44′12″W
  - elevation: 20 feet (6.1 m)

Telogia Creek is a waterway in Florida. It is a major tributary of the Ochlockonee River. It is used for canoeing. The United States Geological Survey (USGS) monitors its discharge near Bristol. The stream's water quality is monitored at a site near Greensboro. Road crossings include the Telogia Creek Bridge.

Botanist Roland McMillan Harper identified several species in the area of the creek during his travels in Florida 1909–1910.

The surrounding area includes horse properties.

There is a community of Telogia, a scouting Telogia Camp, and a Telogia Creek Road. Lampropeltis getula meansi, the Appalachicola Kingsnake, lives in the area. It is non-venomous.

== Paddling ==
The creek can be accessed from the Bently Bluff ramp. Approximately 14 miles downstream (7 miles as the crow flies) it meets up with the Ochlockonee River. Huey P. Arnold County Park can be used as a takeout spot.

The creek's course is windy, portages necessary and there can be snags. Shorter water craft are easier to maneuver along it.
