= Bloxham, Florida =

- Unincorporated community
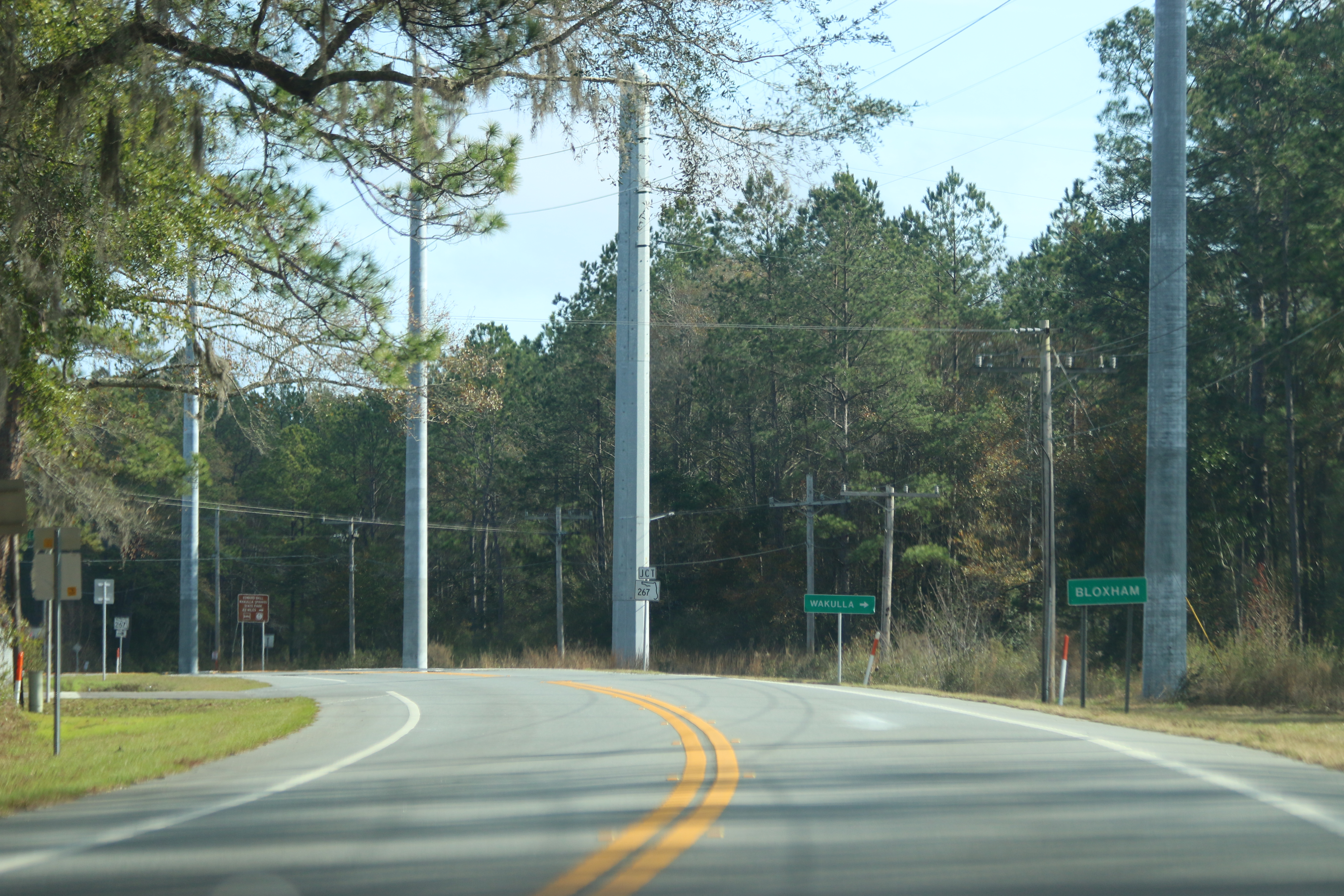
- Sign for Bloxham on State Road 20

- Location within Florida Location within the United States
- Coordinates: 30°23′19″N 84°37′51″W
- Country: United States
- State: Florida
- County: Leon
- Elevation: 102 ft (31 m)
- Time zone: UTC-5 (Eastern (EST))
  - Summer (DST): UTC-4 (EDT)
- Area code: 850
- GNIS feature ID: 305333

Bloxham is an unincorporated community in Leon County, Florida, United States. The community is located at the intersection of State Roads 20 and 267.
