= List of marine biologists =

This is a list of marine biologists.

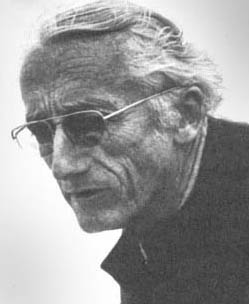
Jacques-Yves Cousteau, co-inventor of the aqua-lung, is well known for popularizing marine biology.

- Donald Putnam Abbott (1920–1986), American marine invertebrate zoologist
- Isabella Aiona Abbott (1919–2010), American marine botanist
- Jakob Johan Adolf Appellöf (1857–1921), Swedish marine zoologist
- Leanne Armand (born 1968), Australian marine scientist
- Samuel Stillman Berry (1887–1984), American marine zoologist
- Henry Bryant Bigelow (1879–1967), American marine biologist
- Jean Bouillon (1926–2009), Belgian marine zoologist
- Rachel Carson (1907–1964), American marine biologist and author
- María Elena Caso (1915–1991), Mexican marine biologist
- Carl Chun (1852–1914), German marine biologist
- Eugenie Clark (1922–2015), American marine biologist
- Malcolm Clarke (1930–2013), British cephalopod expert
- Jacques-Yves Cousteau (1910–1997), French marine explorer, conservationist, and filmmaker
- Charles Darwin (1809–1882), wrote Structure and Distribution of Coral Reefs (1842) while aboard HMS Beagle
- Paul K. Dayton (born 1941), American benthic marine ecologist noted for work in kelp forest ecology
- Finn Devold (1902–1977), Norwegian marine biologist
- Anton Dohrn (1840–1909), German marine biologist
- Nicole Dubilier, American marine microbiologist, head of Max Planck Institute for Marine Microbiology
- Patricia Louise Dudley (1929–2004) American zoologist specializing in copepods
- Sylvia Earle (born 1935), American oceanographer
- Austin Gallagher, marine biologist
- Ruth Gates (1962–2018), American marine biologist noted for work on coral reefs
- George Brown Goode (1851–1896), American ichthyologist
- Philip Henry Gosse (1810–1888), English marine zoologist
- J. Frederick Grassle (1939–2018), American marine biologist
- Judith Grassle, marine ecologist
- David Gruber Professor of Biology and Environmental Sciences and a National Geographic Explorer.
- Gordon Gunter (1909–1998), American marine biologist and fisheries scientist notable for pioneering fisheries research in the northern Gulf of Mexico
- Ernst Haeckel (1834–1919), German physician, zoologist, marine biologist and evolutionist
- Benjamin Halpern, American marine conservationist
- Hans Hass (born 1919), Austrian marine biologist and diving pioneer
- Gotthilf Hempel (born 1929), German marine biologist
- Stephen Hillenburg (1961–2018), American animator (creator of SpongeBob SquarePants); previously worked as a marine biology teacher for several years
- Hirohito, the Shōwa Emperor (1901–1989), jellyfish taxonomist
- Johan Hjort (1869–1948), Norwegian marine zoologist and one of the founders of ICES
- Bruno Hofer (1861–1916), German fisheries scientist
- Martin W. Johnson (1893–1984), American marine biologist and biological oceanographer
- Benjamin Kahn (born 1955), Israeli marine biologist and environmental activist
- Uwe Kils (born 1951), German marine biologist
- Otto Kinne (1923–2015), German marine biologist
- Nancy Knowlton, coral reef biologist and author of Citizens of the Sea (2010)
- August David Krohn (1803–1891), Russian/German zoologist
- Paul L. Kramp (1887–1975), Danish zoologist working on jellyfish
- William Elford Leach (1790–1836), English zoologist and marine biologist
- Nicholai Miklukho-Maklai (1846–1888), Russian marine biologist and anthropologist
- Melissa Cristina Márquez, "Mother of Sharks," marine biologist and science communicator
- Flower Msuya (born 1959), Tanzanian phycologist
- Sir John Murray (1841–1914), Scots-Canadian marine biologist
- Anders Sandøe Ørsted (1816–1872), Danish marine botanist studied arctic nematodes and marine algae
- Robert T. Paine (1933–2016), American marine zoologist known for developing the "keystone species" concept
- Joseph R. Pawlik (born 1960), American marine biologist
- Ronald C. Phillips (1932–2005), American marine botanist, co-author of Seagrasses (1980); worldwide development of seagrass science told in autobiographical Travels with Seagrass (2013)
- Syed Zahoor Qasim (born 1926), Indian marine biologist
- Ed Ricketts (1897–1948), American marine biologist noted for a pioneering study of intertidal ecology
- Harald Rosenthal (born 1937), German hydrobiologist known for his work in fish farming and ecology
- Anne Rudloe (1947–2012), American co-founder of Gulf Specimen Marine Laboratory
- Jack Rudloe (born 1943), American co-founder of Gulf Specimen Marine Laboratory and writer of several popular works on the sea including The Sea Brings Forth, and The Erotic Ocean.
- Frederick Stratten Russell (1897–1984), British marine biologist known for his work on zooplankton.
- Georg Sars (1837–1927), Norwegian marine biologist
- Michael Sars (1809–1869), Norwegian theologian and biologist
- Helen Scales (fl. 2026), British marine biologist and writer
- Oscar Elton Sette (1900–1972), American fisheries scientist notable for pioneering modern fisheries science and fisheries oceanography
- Bell M. Shimada (1922–1958), American fisheries scientist notable for pioneering studies of tuna stocks in the equatorial Pacific Ocean
- Ronald Shimek (born 1948), American marine biologist noted mainly for his work on scaphopods and turrid gastropods
- David N. Thomas (academic) (born 1962) British marine scientist specializing in sea ice ecology and biogeochemistry
- Charles Wyville Thomson (1832–1882), Scottish marine biologist
- Gunnar Thorson (1906–1971), Danish marine biologist
- Anne Thynne (1800–1866), British marine zoologist
- Takasi Tokioka (1913–2001), Japanese marine biologist known for his work on soft bodied zooplankton and tunicates
- Ruth Turner (1915–2000), marine biologist
- Anna Weber-van Bosse (1852–1942), marine phycologist

== See also ==
- List of fictional scientists and engineers
- Notable fisheries scientists
- Notable ichthyologists
