= Michèle Bowley =

Swiss health psychologist

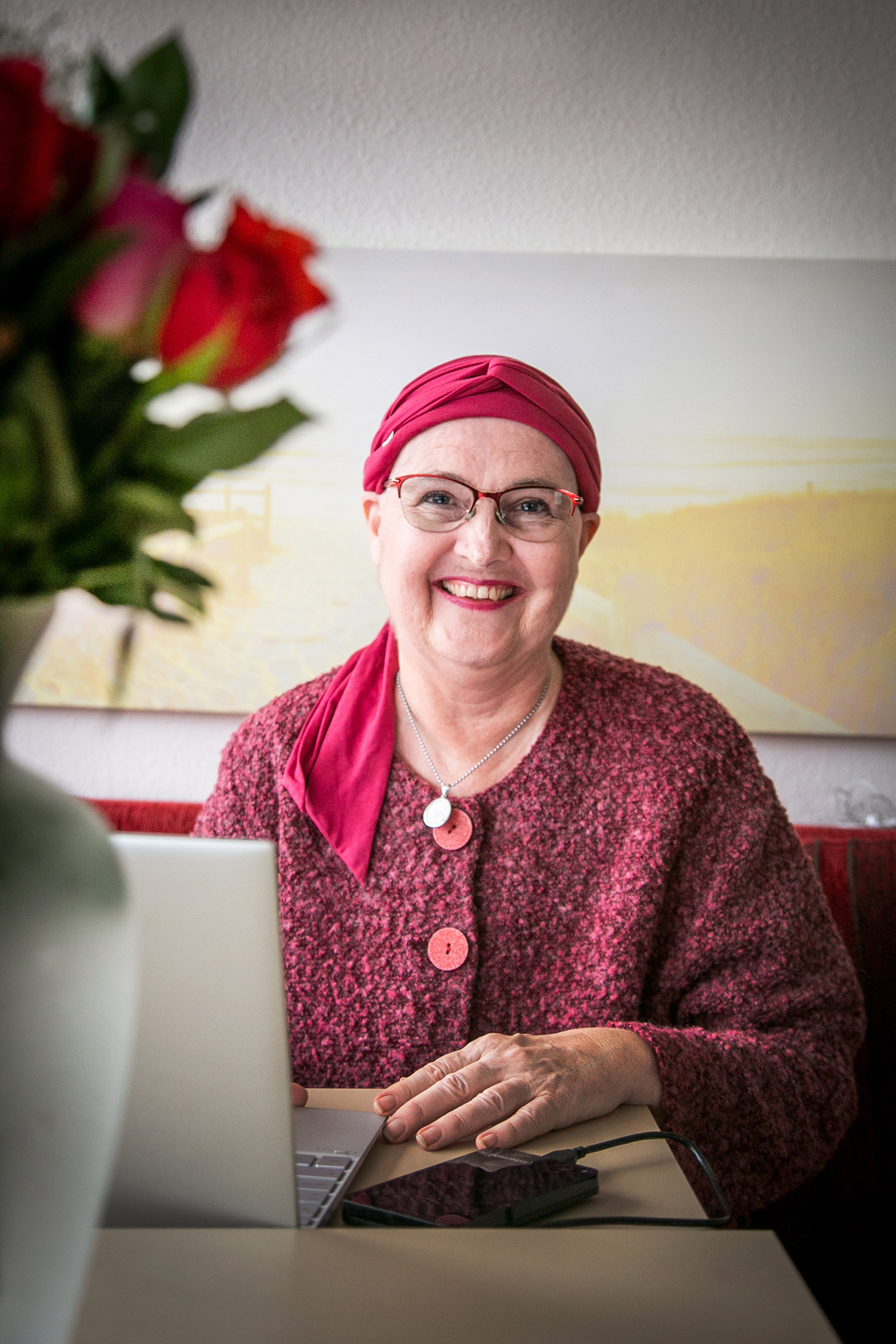
Michèle Bowley, health psychologist and book author, Basel

Michèle Bowley (June 28, 1966, Basel – November 30, 2023, Basel) was a Swiss health psychologist with additional training in adult education, project management and systemic, solution-oriented coaching. She owned the company "Psyche stärken by bowley resources" (Strengthen your psyche by bowley resources). She produced an Internet video diary about her cancer and how she was dealing with her impending death. She became a book author in 2023.

== Early life ==
Michèle Bowley grew up in the Basel region. Her father is English, her mother Swiss. From 1981 to 1985 she attended the business high school in nearby Muttenz. During this period, she also spent a year as a senior high school student in the USA.

== Education ==
She began her studies in social psychology at the University of Zurich in 1986 with subsidiary studies in sociology and Social and Preventive Medicine. She was a working student and graduated as a psychologist (lic. phil.) in 1995.

== Career ==
Bowley began her professional career in 1995 as a research assistant at the Institute for Social and Preventive Medicine at the University of Basel. Subsequently, she participated in numerous practical activities. She developed and implemented various programs and projects in public administration and in diverse associations. From 1997 until 2004 she headed the Tobacco Prevention Unit at the Basel Lung Association. In 2004 she worked as manager of "Gsünder Basel" (Healthier Basel), an association promoting health activities. From 2009 until 2015 she headed the program for mental health at the health department of the canton of Zug. In this function, she regularly wrote a column "Ratgeber Gesundheit" (health guide) for the local newspaper. In 2010 she received the "Public Health Switzerland Award for the best practice-based abstract" together with Matthias Meyer, head of Zug's health department.

In 2015 she returned to the Basel region where she promoted health improvement measures for children and adolescents. At the organisation "Benevol" she managed "Tandem 50 plus", a mentoring program that helps out-of-work people over 50 years of age to find a new job.

In 2018 Bowley ventured into self-employment and established the one-woman company "psyche stärken by bowley resources", in which she focused on the program about improving health (copyright Pro Mente Upper Austria). She adapted the program to suit the needs of diverse target groups (job seekers, caring relatives, pensioners and migrant populations for example). Michèle conveyed the appropriate knowledge in courses, individual consultations and projects such as the development of new offers and brochures for institutions from the social and health-care sector and for individuals from the private sector.

Her company provided courses for the regional employment mediation office in Zug on behalf of the coaching institute "VivaCoaching" in Basel, on how to apply for a job. At the coaching institute "livingsense" in Zurich she worked as a professional coach for Golden Agers. She also supported the Zurich University Hospital in its efforts to help people who wanted to stop smoking.

== Post-diagnosis ==
She was diagnosed with breast cancer in 2020, and began publishing "My Cancer Diary", a series of internet videos about her condition and describing the effects and side effects of her therapy. The aim of each post was to keep family members and friends up to date with her progress and to inspire others afflicted with cancer to lead a fulfilling life in spite of their condition. In autumn 2021, after surviving chemotherapy, radiotherapy and surgery, she learned that she had incurable brain metastases and a life expectancy of three to six months.

When Michèle Bowley found out that her cancer was incurable, she decided to share her experiences with other people interested in the topic. The filmmaker Florian Bitterlin produced "Hallo&Tschüss" (Hello&Goodbye) a short film that can be viewed on Michèle's website (www.psyche-staerken.ch) or on YouTube.

On January 17, 2022, the Swiss daily newspaper "Tages-Anzeiger" published an interview with Michèle that triggered an overwhelming reader response. Asked if she feared her impending death, Michèle Bowley replied: "No, I’m not afraid of dying". When the interviewer asked why, she replied: "I've had a good life. There's nothing I regret or would have done differently. I don't fear what's coming and I'm curious whether it ends as I imagine. I'm not afraid of the last few minutes."

In October 2021 the film makers Silvia Haselbeck and Erich Langjahr started to film Michèle's final days from diagnosis until her last breath and the funeral service. The film titled „The Taboo Breaker" has been published on 2024.

In February 2022 Michèle and two other women founded «Hallo&Tschüss» an association dedicated to their intellectual endowment and continuing the message "LEBE DEINS – JETZT" (LIVE YOURS– NOW).

The Swiss Cancer League awarded Michèle Bowley the Medal of Honour 2022 for her open approach to the topics of dying and cancer.

In 2023 Michèle published two books with the publishing house Cuvillier: her autobiography "VOLLE PULLE LEBEN; LEBE DEINS – JETZT" and a collection of her poems and illustrations "einlassen & loslassen; Gedichte zum Buch Volle Pulle Leben".

Michèle Bowley's autobiography takes readers on a journey through Switzerland. Various media have reviewed it. Irène Böhm wrote about "VOLLE PULLE LEBEN; LEBE DEINS – JETZT" in the Sissach newspaper "Volksstimme": "Whoever reads Michèle Bowley's biography will be richly rewarded. The 56-year-old author sparkles with joie de vivre and lets readers share it".

On November 6, 2023, she published her last video in her cancer diary on YouTube, in which she told viewers that the methastases had spread throughout her body and that she would die in the near future.

She ultimately died on November 30, 2023, in Basel.

== Publications ==
- Michèle Bowley: VOLLE PULLE LEBEN; LEBE DEINS – JETZT. Cuvillier Publishers, Göttingen 2023, ISBN 978-3-7719-8, 218 pages.
- Michèle Bowley: einlassen & loslassen; poems related to Volle Pulle Leben. Cuvillier Publishers, Göttingen 2023, ISBN 978-3-7369-6, 33 pages.
