= Mitzi Nagarkatti =

American microbiologist and administrator

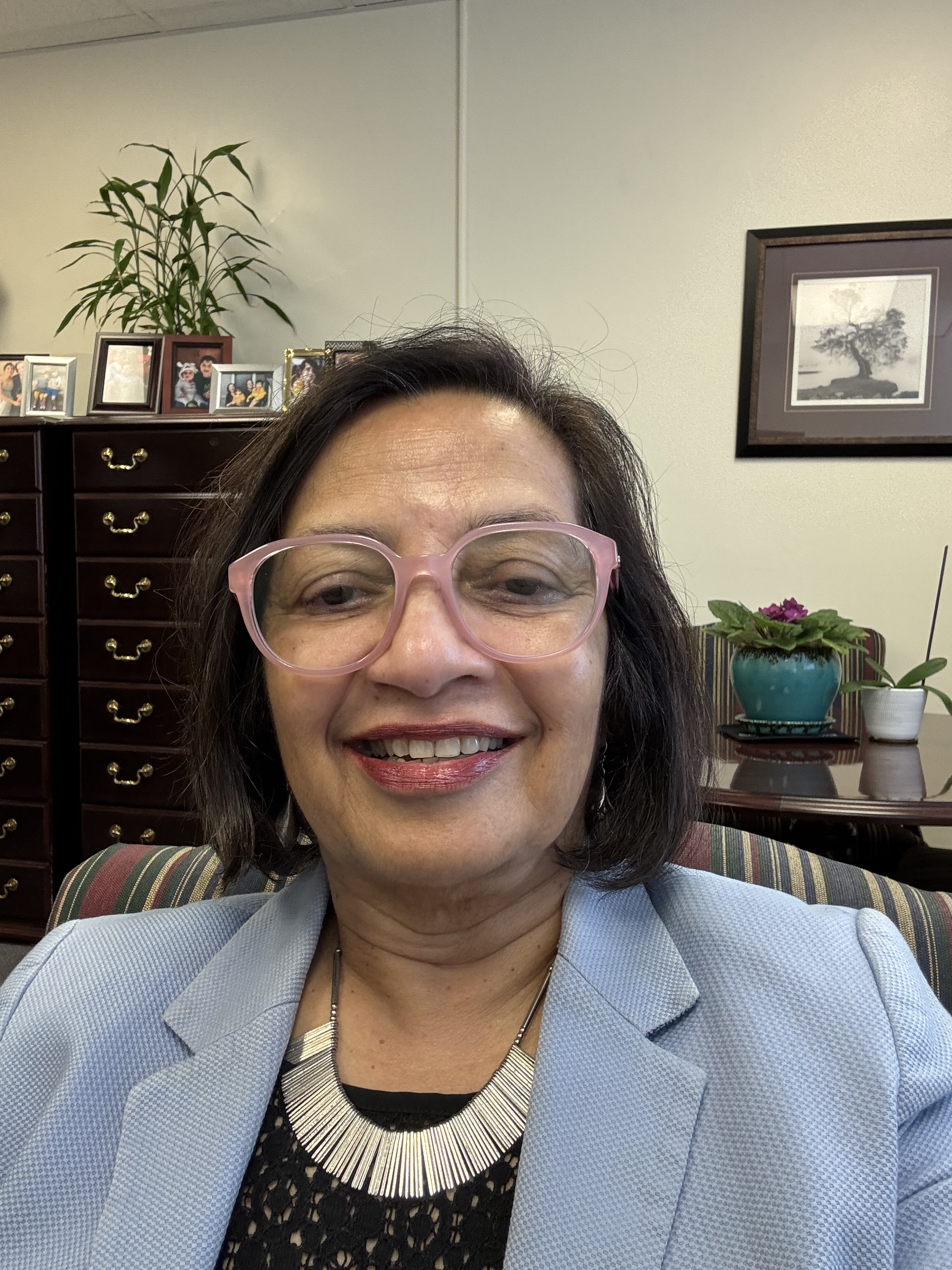
SmartState Endowed Chair of the Center for Cancer Drug Discovery at the University of SC, and Carolina Distinguished Professor of Pathology, Microbiology & Immunology.

Mitzi Nagarkatti is a researcher and a university administrator who has served as the Chair of the Department of Pathology, Microbiology and Immunology at the University of South Carolina (USC) School of Medicine at Columbia, SC, since 2005. She is also the SmartState Endowed Chair of the Center for Cancer Drug Discovery and Carolina Distinguished Professor. She pursues research in inflammatory diseases, immunotoxicology, and immunopharmacology. She has been recognized for her research contributions through numerous awards leading to her election as a Fellow of the American Association for the Advancement of Science (AAAS), Fellow of the Academy of Toxicological Sciences, Fellow of the National Academy of Inventors, and Fellow of the American Academy of Microbiology.

Mitzi Nagarkatti has also been recognized for her service through numerous awards, such as the Virginia Commonwealth University’s Women in Science, Dentistry, and Medicine Professional Development Award, USC's Breakthrough Leadership Award, USC School of Medicine's Diversity and Inclusion Leadership Award, and the first USC School of Medicine's Award for Advancement of Women in Science and Medicine. In 2022, she was elected President of the Association of Medical School Microbiology and Immunology Chairs (AMSMIC). She served on the Board of the Academy of Toxicological Sciences from 2023 to 2026. She was also elected to serve on the American Association of Immunologists Finance Committee for 2021–2024.

Nagarkatti has made numerous discoveries on how cannabinoids attenuate inflammation as well as kill certain types of cancers. Her studies have shown that cannabinoids can attenuate numerous autoimmune disorders such as multiple sclerosis, autoimmune hepatitis, and colitis, as well as inflammatory diseases such as Acute Respiratory Distress Syndrome, PTSD, endometriosis, and the like. Her laboratory has also shown how activation of CB2 receptors by cannabinoids attenuates colonic inflammation and colon cancer, and that CB1 blocking can attenuate obesity through induction of unique miRNA. She has also worked extensively on cannabidiol (CBD) to treat inflammatory diseases. Research from her laboratory demonstrating that CBD can be used to treat autoimmune hepatitis was the basis for FDA to approve its use as an orphan drug to treat this disorder.

Nagarkatti's laboratory has also studied the effect of a number of botanicals and natural products, including resveratrol, ginseng, Sparstolonin-B, indoles, and others, on autoimmune diseases and cancer. Her laboratory discovered that Bryostatin-1 (Bryo-1), a macrocyclic lactone isolated from the marine bryozoan, acts as a TLR-4 ligand and can activate dendritic cells. Her collaborative work in this area led to a major discovery that Bryostatin-1 can be used to treat latent HIV infection and formed the basis for clinical trials on the use of Bryostatin as a latent infection-reversing agent in HIV-infected patients. Nagarkatti's laboratory also demonstrated how certain botanicals, such as Indole-3-Carbinol, act as ligands for the Aryl Hydrocarbon Receptor and regulate inflammation.

Nagarkatti has also written extensively in The Conversation on various topics such as COVID-19 vaccines, inflammation, endocannabinoids, and marijuana cannabinoids.

Nagarkatti has served on grant review panels for funding agencies such as the National Institutes of Health (NIH), Veterans Administration, Department of Defense, American Cancer Society, Swiss Cancer League, Health Research Board of Ireland, New Zealand Oncology Grants, National Research Council, US Army Medical R&D Command, and USDA Animal Health and Diseases. She has served as a regular member of the NIH Systemic Injury by Environmental Exposure Study Section. She was appointed by the US Secretary of Health and Human Service, Dr. Sebelius, to the National Toxicology Program (NTP) Board of Scientific Counselors at the National Institute of Environmental Health Sciences (NIEHS) for a 4-year term. Nagarkatti has also served as a Chartered National Center for Research Resources (NCRR, NIH) member.

Nagarkatti has also established an endowment fund at the Society of Toxicology (SOT) to recognize graduate students and postdoctoral scholars for research excellence and to enable them to attend the SOT Annual Meetings.

== Education ==
Mitzi Nagarkatti received her B.S. degree in physics, Chemistry and Biology from Bangalore University, Bangalore, India, and M.S. degree in Microbiology from Karnatak University, Hubli, India. Nagarkatti received her Ph.D. in Pathology from Jiwaji University while working as a Senior Scientist at the Defense Research Development Establishment, Gwalior, India. She next pursued post-doctoral studies at McMaster University, Hamilton, Ontario, Canada from 1981 to 1983. She then moved to seek a second post-doctoral fellowship with Dr. Alan Kaplan at the University of Kentucky.

== Career ==
Nagarkatti started her independent career as an Assistant Professor in the Department of Biology, Virginia Tech, Blacksburg, VA in 1986. She was next recruited as an Associate Professor at the Virginia-Maryland College of Veterinary College at Virginia Tech. She was promoted to Professor in the Department of Biomedical Sciences and Pathobiology. In 2000, she was recruited to the Medical College of Virginia (MCV), Virginia Commonwealth University, as a professor in the Dept. of Microbiology and Immunology. Here, she directed the Immune Mechanisms Program of the National Cancer Institute (NCI) designated Massey Cancer Center. Nagarkatti was recruited to the University of South Carolina's School of Medicine as Chair of the Department of Pathology, Microbiology, and Immunology in 2005. In 2017, she was named SmartState Endowed Chair of the Center for Cancer Drug Discovery and Carolina Distinguished Professor.

== Selected bibliography ==
- Singh NP, Yang X, Bam M, Nagarkatti M, Nagarkatti P. 2,3,7,8-Tetrachlorodibenzo-p-dioxin induces multigenerational alterations in the expression of microRNA in the thymus through epigenetic modifications. PNAS Nexus. 2022 Dec 9;2(1):pgac290. doi:
- Xue D, Older EA, Zhong Z, Shang Z, Chen N, Dittenhauser N, Hou L, Cai P, Walla MD, Dong SH, Tang X, Chen H, Nagarkatti P, Nagarkatti M, Li YX, Li J. Correlational networking guides the discovery of unclustered lanthipeptide protease-encoding genes. Nat Commun. 2022 Mar 28;13(1):1647. doi: 10.1038/s41467-022-29325-1.
- McKallip, R.J., Lombard, C., Fisher, M., Martin, B.R., Ryu, S., Nagarkatti, P.S. and Nagarkatti, M. targeting CB2 cannabinoid receptors as a novel therapy to treat malignancies of the immune system. Blood 100:627-634, 2002.
- Shidal C, Singh NP, Nagarkatti P, Nagarkatti M. MicroRNA-92 Expression in CD133+ Melanoma Stem Cells Regulates Immunosuppression in the Tumor Microenvironment via Integrin-Dependent Activation of TGFβ. Cancer Res. 2019 Jul 15;79(14):3622-3635. doi: 10.1158/0008-5472.CAN-18-2659. Epub 2019 Apr 23.
- Nagarkatti, M., Hassuneh, M., Seth, A., Manickasundari, K. and Nagarkatti, P. S. Constitutive activation of IL-2 gene in the induction of spontaneous in vitro transformation and tumorigenicity of a T cell line. Proc. Natl. Acad. Sci. USA 91:7638-7642, 1994.
