= Gulf Specimen Marine Laboratory =

Marine research organization and public aquarium

Gulf Specimen Marine Laboratory, Inc
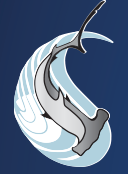
- Predecessor: Gulf Specimen Marine Company, Panacea Institute of Marine Science
- Founder: Jack and Anne Rudloe
- Tax ID no.: 59-2021454
- Location: Panacea, Florida
- Managing director: Jack Rudloe
- Executive director: Cypress Rudloe
- Office manager: Debbi Clifford
- Board of directors: David Frisby, Andrea Carter, Robert Seidler, Jack Rudloe, Cypress Rudloe
- Staff: 6
- Website: gulfspecimen.org

External videos
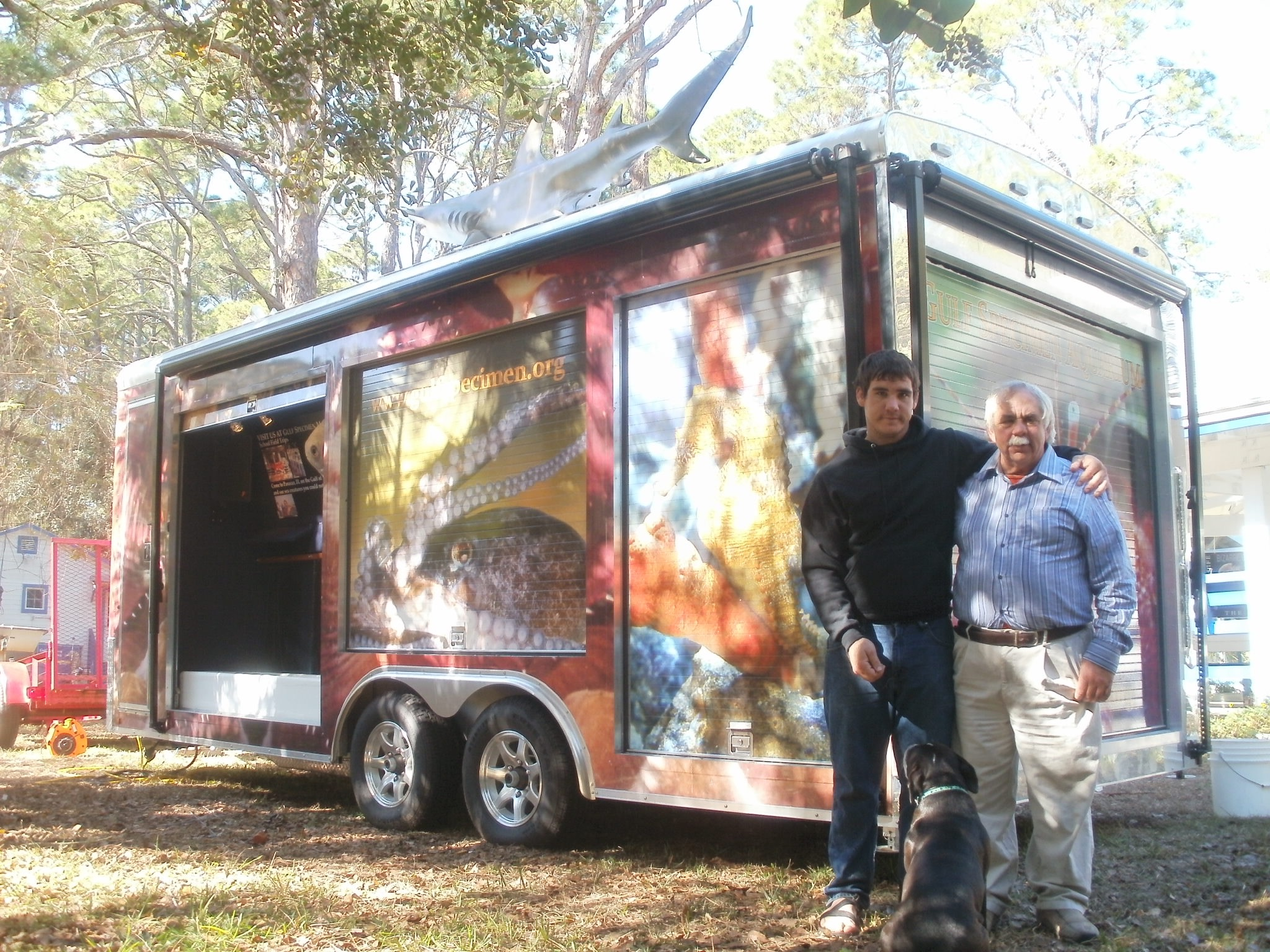
- Jack and Cypress Rudloe with the Sea Mobile
- Gulf Specimen Sea Turtle Release of "Spot" Rehabilitated Kemp's Ridley
- WFSU Demensions Allie the Sea Turtle Release

Gulf Specimen Marine Laboratory (GSML) is an independent not-for-profit marine research and education organization and public aquarium in Panacea, Florida, United States.

== History ==
The laboratory has its origins in Gulf Specimen Marine Company, which was founded by writer and naturalist Jack Rudloe in 1963 as a marine specimen company primarily supplying scientists. John Steinbeck was an important mentor to the company. The present location in Panacea, Florida, was purchased in 1964. In 1971 Rudloe married marine biologist Anne Eidemiller; Anne Rudloe founded the Panacea Institute of Marine Science in 1980. In 1980 this became a registered non-profit as Gulf Specimen Marine Laboratories, Inc., with Jack and Anne Rudloe as cofounders.

In 2010 Jack and Anne's son Cypress Rudloe took over as general manager. In 2012, Richard Gordon joined as emeritus scientist. In December 2014 the aquarium suffered a major setback when the aging ozonator donated to GSML two decades before by Valdosta State University stopped working. The aquarium launched a social media campaign and by March 2015 had raised over $70,000 to purchase the new equipment and to rebuild and upgrade the associated water purification system. The new water purification system, donated at cost by Xylem Inc. came on line June 2015. Hurricane Hermine made landfall near the laboratory September 2, 2016 causing damage to the lab itself as well as severe damage to the famous dock that was subject of the book The Living Dock, by Jack Rudloe. The dock was rebuilt after a third social media campaign. On October 10, 2018, storm surge from Hurricane Michael severely damaged the Living Dock. Storm surge entered the main floor and grounds of the facility, especially one of two sump systems, but damage was otherwise minimal, especially compared to other areas hit by the hurricane and the laboratory reopened the following week. Total damage has been estimated at $200,000 and repairs are ongoing. GSML was hard hit by the COVID-19 pandemic with revenues dropping to 10% of normal. The lab continued with virtual visits and Facebook tours but suffered a severe financial blow before reopening to the public when restrictions eased.

In July 2020 Volunteer Florida, awarded GSML a $485,000 grant to build a 2,000-square-foot classroom complex along with a new parking lot. GSML also acquired six lots adjacent to the original site with a land donation from Gene and Nancy Phipps of the Tallahassee Phipps Foundation to house the building and parking lot. The new Anne Rudloe Memorial Education Center will be dedicated to the memory of Anne Rudloe and will be offering new aquaculture classes to local seafood cooking tutorials, and further its mission of educating the community on marine life. In 2021 the Governing Board for the Northwest Florida Water Management District posthumously named Anne Rudloe the 2020 winner of the River and Bay Champion award. “Anne Rudloe’s passion for conservation and education throughout her career earned her national recognition,” said George Roberts, the Chairman of the District’s Governing Board. “But her biggest impact may be found in the thousands and thousands of children who learned about marine biology from touring the Marine Lab she founded in Panacea. No doubt, there will be scientists of tomorrow who discovered their own passion for learning thanks to Anne Rudloe’s work.”

== Activities ==
In addition to providing specimens for other scientists, GSML publishes both peer-reviewed scientific works and popular articles, and is involved in environmental activism, particularly in regards to coastal wetlands preservation. GSML also rescues and rehabilitates marine organisms, especially sea turtles. In 1990 the Gulf Specimen Marine Aquarium opened to the public; it has over 20,000 visitors annually. Norman Griggs DVM of Shepherd Spring Animal Hospital is the GSML veterinarian. He provides sea turtle care pro bono and in 2015 allowed GSML to expand the hospital facilities to include a sea turtle tank.

== Wetland preservation ==
Gulf Specimen Marine Lab has worked to preserve coastal wetlands and in particular was directly involved in the preservation of 35,000 acres of wetlands in the Florida Panhandle and the Florida Big Bend region through government lobbying, appearances at public meetings, television and radio appearances, and popular articles and books about marine wetlands.

== Jellyfish industry ==
Gulf Specimen Marine Laboratory was involved in early efforts to establish the now successful jellyfish export industry on the East Coast of the US.

== Sea turtle rescue ==
Gulf Specimen Marine Laboratory staff began tagging sea turtles under the guidance of Archie Carr and were the third sea turtle rescue organization in Florida. GSML is one of 23 state-permitted captive sea turtle facilities and the northernmost in Florida. In addition to short-term rescue such as cold-stunning and fish hook removal the lab provides long-term rehabilitation. The lab lacks specialized laser treatment surgical equipment for sea turtles and must transfer them from the Panhandle region to facilities such as Clearwater Marine Aquarium if they require laser treatment for fibropapillomatosis. However Dr. Griggs have been successful in complex surgical procedures such as reconstructive surgery on partial amputations. Their best known sea turtle was Allie, a 250 lb (113 kg), 50-year-old female loggerhead sea turtle rescued by a local commercial fisherman at Alligator Point, Florida, on May 15, 2012. Allie required 14 months of care before she was returned to the wild on June 22, 2013. Thousands of people followed her recovery online and 1500 people came to see her released at Bald Point State Park. In 2015 GSML joined the Responsible Pier Initiative as a partner with The Loggerhead Marinelife Centre. This resulted in a 600% increase in the number of Kemp's ridleys they rescued (from an average of 1-3/year to 17 in 2015) and they started a second social media campaign to expand their turtle rehabilitation facilities. In March 2016 GSML opened a "turtle hospital" in a renovated kitchen to give Dr. Griggs and GSML staff a suitable place to treat the turtles at the lab and decrease transport stress on animals. GSML has twice been involved in rescuing many cold-stunned sea turtles first in 2010 and then again in 2018. In May 2020, fishermen brought in a large female critically endangered Kemp's ridley sea turtle caught in their net. Facebook followers were polled and she was named Myrtle. The turtle was treated for a neck injury before release back to the wild.

== Education ==
Gulf Specimen Marine Lab staff and volunteers use experiential learning approaches to teach marine science and environmental awareness. GSML has several "touch tanks" of various sizes where visitors are encouraged to handle marine organisms "to overcome fear and increase curiosity and thereby learning" as well as guided marsh walks and visits to the GSML dock. The laboratory is visited by an average of 12,000 children in 400 school groups each year. In 2011 GSML added the Sea Mobile, a mobile version of the touch tank display, to provide the experience to groups unable to travel to the aquarium. GSML also provides internship opportunities to community college and university students.

== Contributions to research ==
Gulf Specimen Marine Laboratory provides marine specimens to scientists worldwide, including some that were the first specimen known to science, such as Chiropsella rudloei. GSML provided organisms sent to space by NASA. In addition GSML has supported direct research; for example, the laboratory assisted with an update to the 1957 Winston Menzel Annotated Check-list of the Marine Fauna and Flora of the region and provides the National Geographic Society-supported The Photo Ark project with an ongoing source of specimens. In 1968 GSML provided the first specimens of the bryozoan Bugula neritina used by the National Cancer Institute (NCI) to develop the bryostatin family of drugs used for treatment of cancer, HIV, Alzheimer's disease and strokes. Authors associated with GSML and its predecessor the Panacea Institute of Marine Science have published more than 40 peer-reviewed scientific articles on horseshoe crabs, electric rays, mysid shrimp, sea turtles, algae fuel and astrobiology.

== Awards ==
- 2014 Education and Outreach Environmental Law Institute National Wetlands Award
- 2004 ChevronTexaco Conservation Award
- 2003 Gulf Guardian Award Winners (3rd)
- 2003 Governor's Community Investment Award, Partners in Prevention.
- 2021 The Governing Board for the Northwest Florida Water Management District named Anne Rudloe the 2020 winner of the River and Bay Champion award.
