= Anne Rudloe =

American marine biologist (1947–2012)

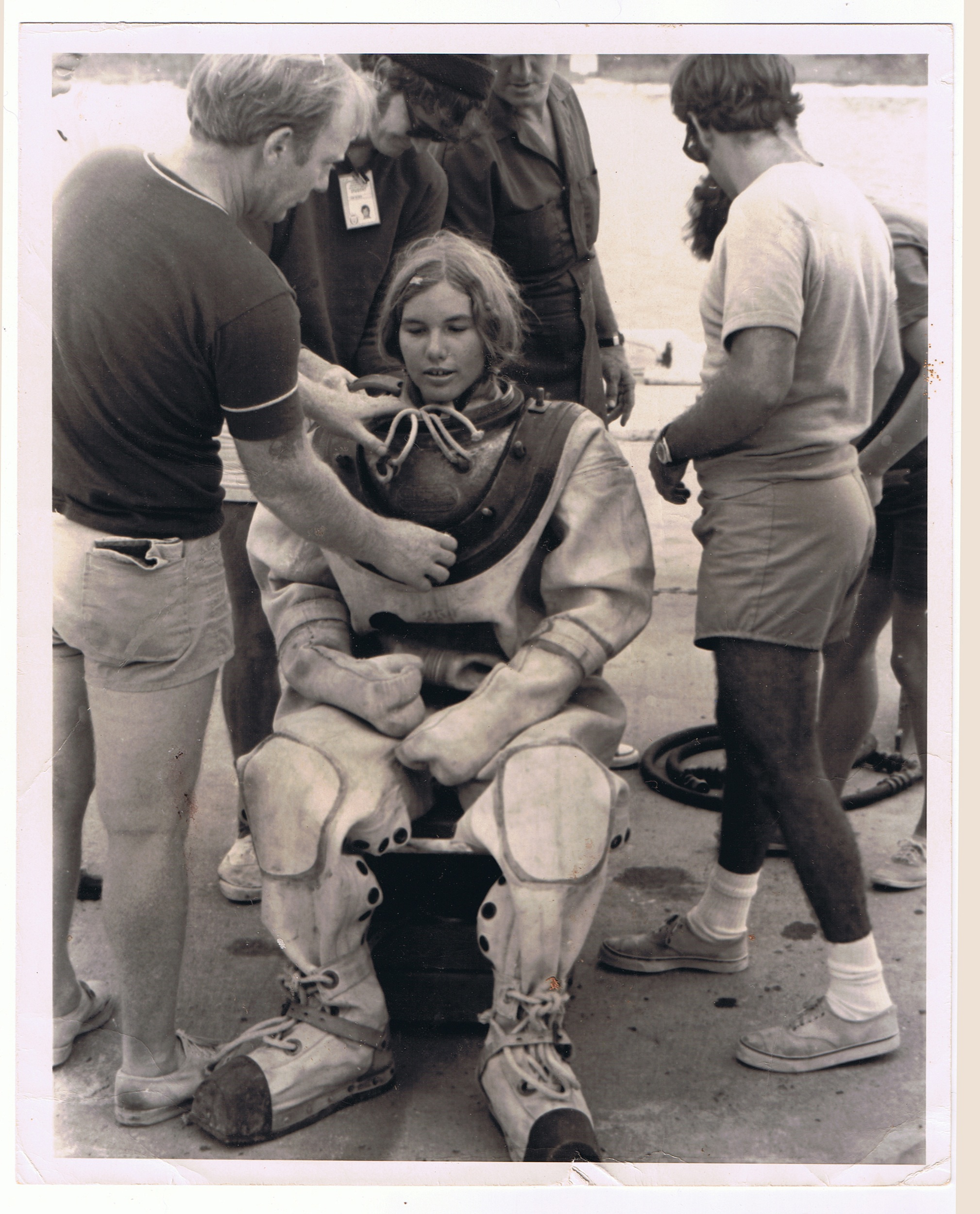
- Rudloe at the U.S. Naval base in Panama City in the underwater research and diving techniques as part of the "Scientists in the Sea" program
- Born: Anne Eidemiller; December 24, 1947; Troy, Ohio, U.S.
- Died: April 27, 2012 (aged 64); Panacea, Florida, U.S.
- Education: Mary Washington College; Florida State University
- Spouse: Jack Rudloe (m. 1971)
- Awards: National Wetlands Award
- Scientific career
- Fields: Marine biology
- Workplaces: Panacea Institute of Marine Science; Gulf Specimen Marine Laboratory

External videos
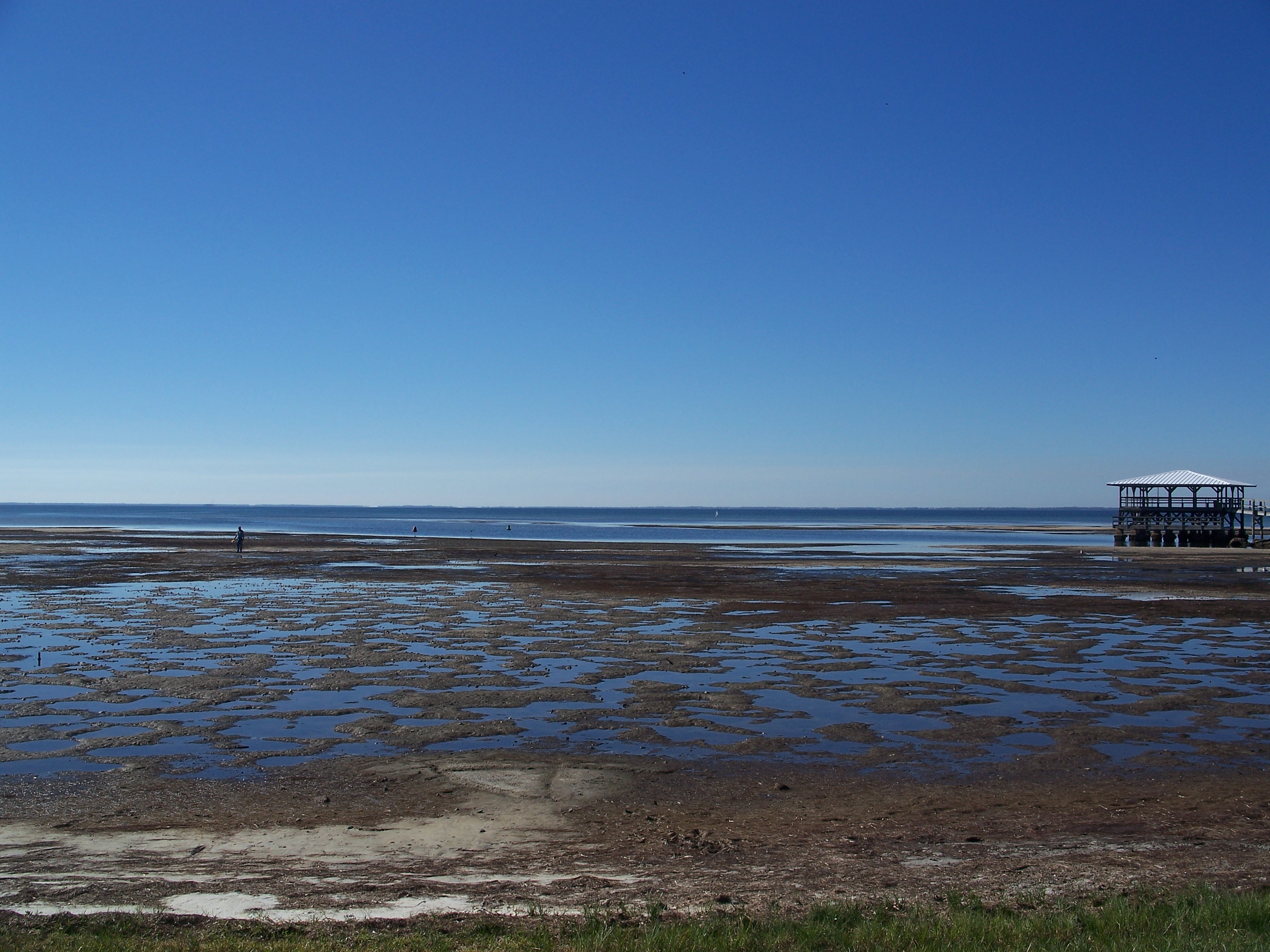
- Jack and Anne Rudloe coastal tour, St. Joseph Bay, AMM1539
- The Estuary of Panacea, Gulf Specimen Aquarium

Anne Rudloe (née Eidemiller, December 24, 1947 – April 27, 2012) was an American marine biologist. She was the co-founder of the Gulf Specimen Marine Laboratory in Panacea, Florida.

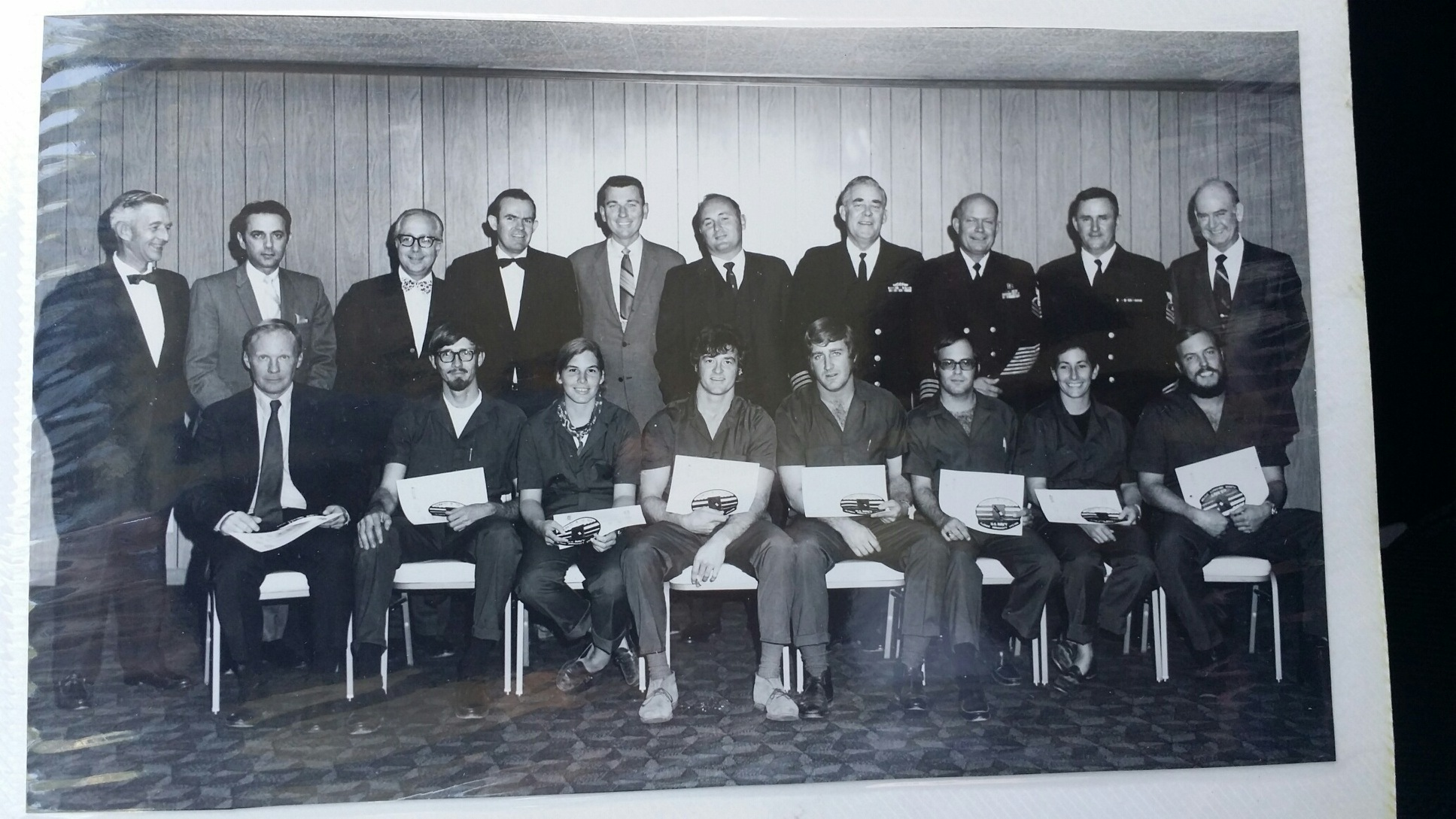
Anne Rudloe third from left in United States Naval base in Panama City in underwater research and diving techniques 1960s. In the back row, fourth from the right, is Dr. (Captain) George F. Bond, senior medical officer and principal investigator for the Sealab I and Sealab II experiments in the mid-1960s.

== Biography ==
Rudloe was born Anne Eidemiller, December 24, 1947, in Troy, Ohio, and grew up in Hampton, Virginia. In 1971, she married writer and naturalist Jack Rudloe.

She earned a BSc (Biology) at Mary Washington College in 1969. She received an MSc in oceanography from Florida State University in 1972 for Significant associations of the motile epibenthos of the turtle-grass beds of St. Joseph Bay, Florida. She received a PhD in Marine Biology in 1978 working with William F. Hernkind at Florida State University for Some ecologically significant aspects of the behavior of the horseshoe crab Limulus polyphemus. She trained at the United States Naval base in Panama City in underwater research and diving techniques in the "Scientists in the Sea" program and was the first woman to complete the program. She was an FSU adjunct professor of biological science. In 1980 she founded the Panacea Institute of Marine Science in Panacea, Florida. In 1990, she co-founded the Gulf Specimen Marine Laboratory, as a non-profit teaching laboratory of which she was the managing director.

Rudloe published five books, in addition to scientific articles on horseshoe crabs, electric rays, mysid shrimp, and sea turtles. She wrote for a larger audience as well, in publications such as National Geographic, Smithsonian Magazine, Sports Illustrated, Natural History and Audubon. The article "Trouble in Bayou Country" (National Geographic 182 (September 1979): 377–9), which she co-wrote with her husband, is frequently cited in accounts of environmental damage to the Atchafalaya Basin.

Rudloe also studied Zen Buddhism and received INGA (Dharma transmission) to teach as a JDPSN (Jido Pope Sanim) in the Kwan Um School of Zen. She then became the Abbot at the Cypress Tree Zen Center in Tallahassee, Florida. She was a frequent guest contributor for National Public Radio for both her conservation efforts and Zen Buddhism.

She died of colon cancer, April 27, 2012.

Rudloe was posthumously honored by the Environmental Law Institute with the 2014 Education and Outreach/National Wetlands award. In July 2020 Volunteer Florida, awarded GSML a $485,000 grant to build a 2,000-square-foot classroom complex along with a new parking lot. GSML also acquired six lots adjacent to the original site with a land donation from Gene and Nancy Phipps of the Tallahassee Phipps Foundation to house the building and parking lot. The new Anne Rudloe Memorial Education Center will be dedicated to the memory of Anne Rudloe and will be offering new aquaculture classes to local seafood cooking tutorials, and further its mission of educating the community on marine life.

In 2021 the Governing Board for the Northwest Florida Water Management District named Anne Rudloe the 2020 winner of the River and Bay Champion award.

== Selected works ==
- Butterflies on a sea wind: beginning Zen (2002)
- Chicken Wars (fiction, 2006, with Jack Rudloe)
- Priceless Florida: natural ecosystems and native species (2004, with E. Whitney and D.B. Means)
- Shrimp: the endless quest for pink gold (2010, with Jack Rudloe)
- Zen in a Wild Country (2012)
- "The Suwannee, Our Wild and Scenic Rivers" in National Geographic Vol. 152, No. 1, July, 1977 (with Jack Rudloe)
