= Jack Rudloe =

Writer, naturalist, and environmental activist

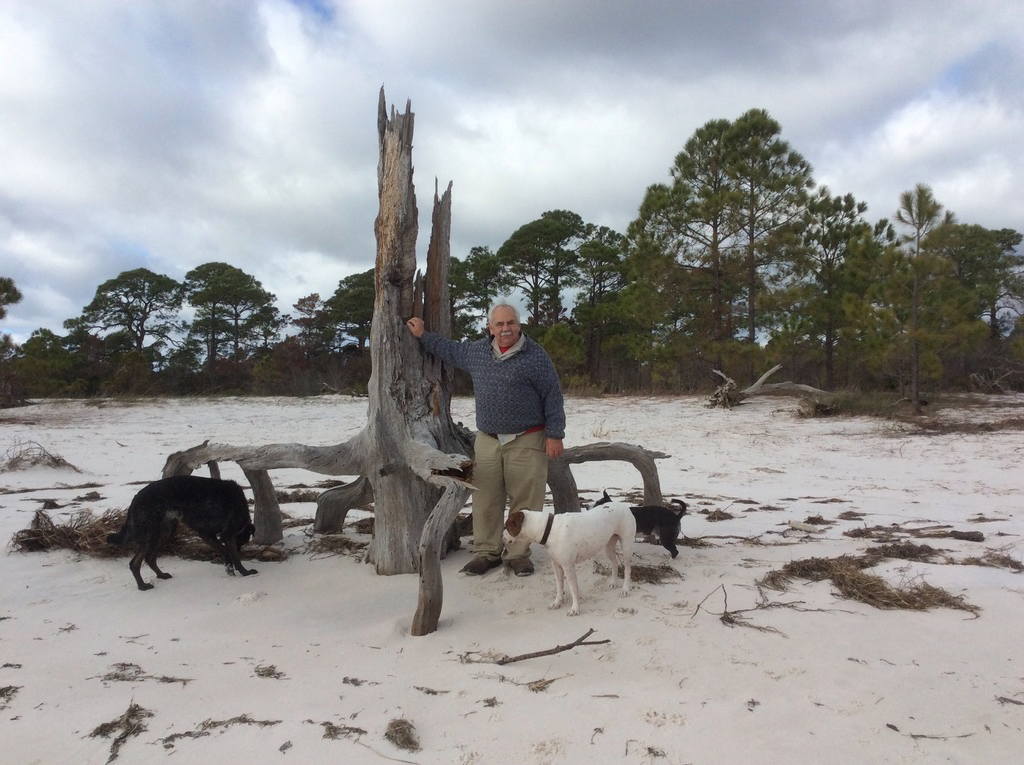
- Jack Rudloe, founder of Gulf Specimen Marine (Photo Dec 27, 2018)
- Born: February 17, 1943 (age 83); Brooklyn, New York
- Known for: Co-founder of Gulf Specimen Marine Laboratory
- Spouse: Anne Rudloe (m. 1971; died 2012)
- Children: 2
- Scientific career
- Fields: Naturalist, Writer

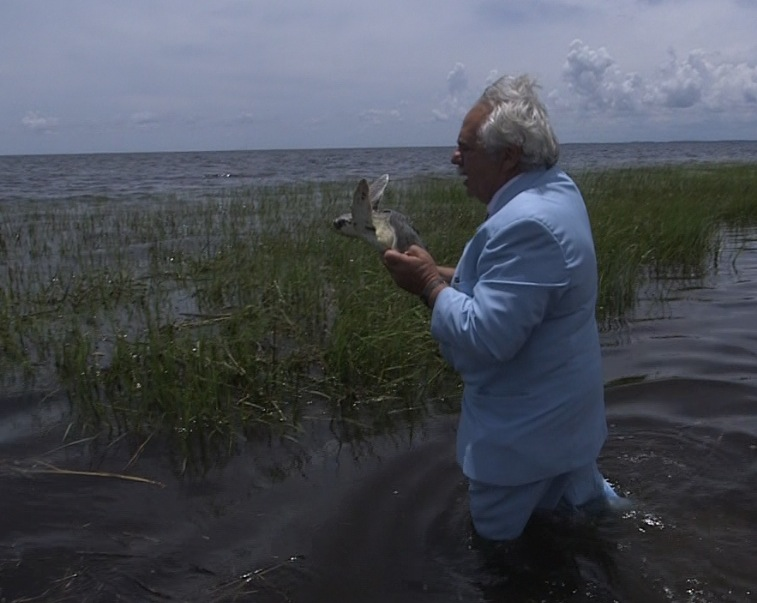
Jack Rudloe (72) wearing his trademark blue suit for the release of a rehabilitated Kemp's ridley sea turtle

Jack Rudloe is a writer, naturalist, and environmental activist from Panacea, Florida, United States, who co-founded Gulf Specimen Marine Laboratory.

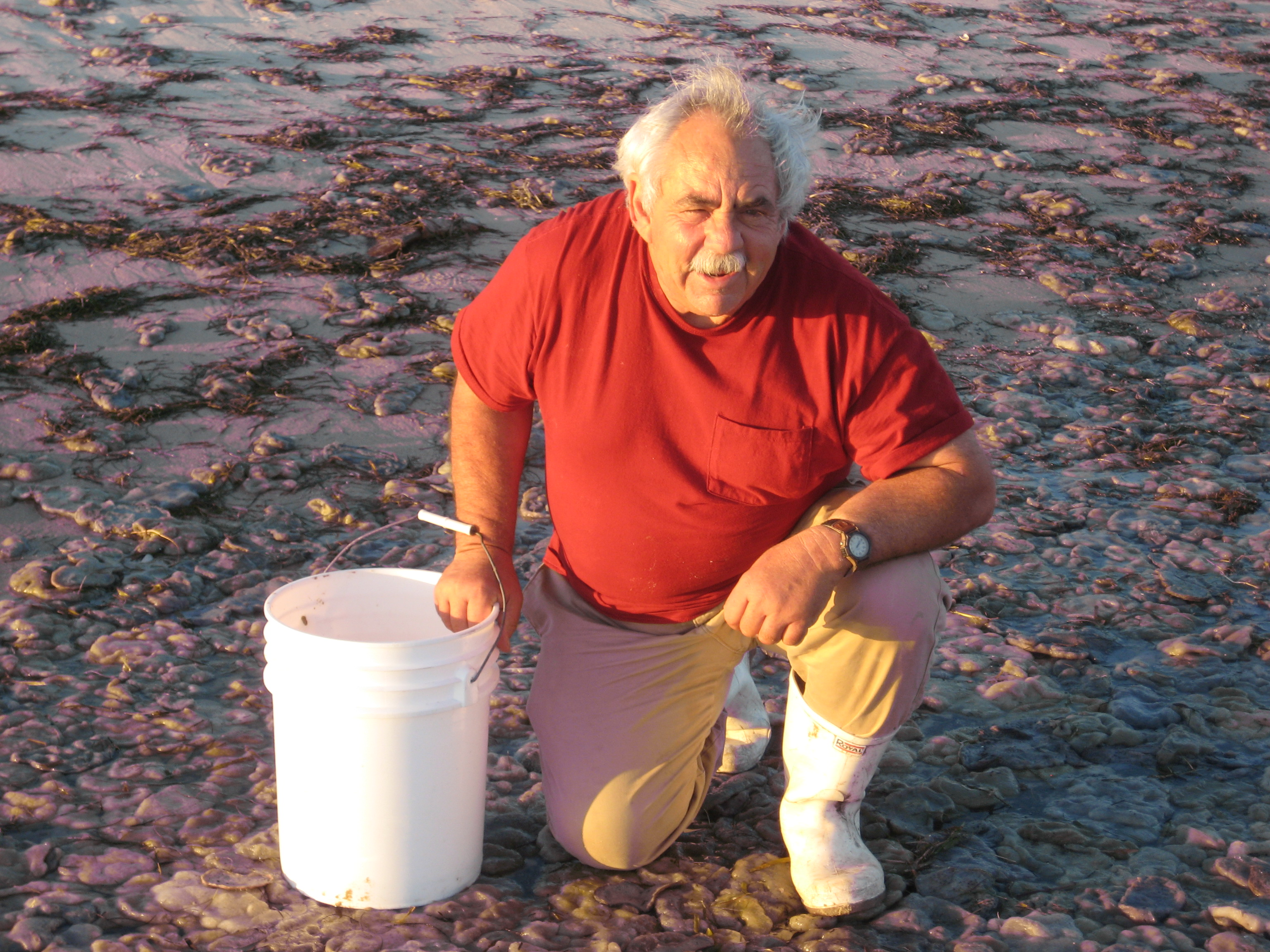
Jack Rudloe collecting at low tide.

External videos
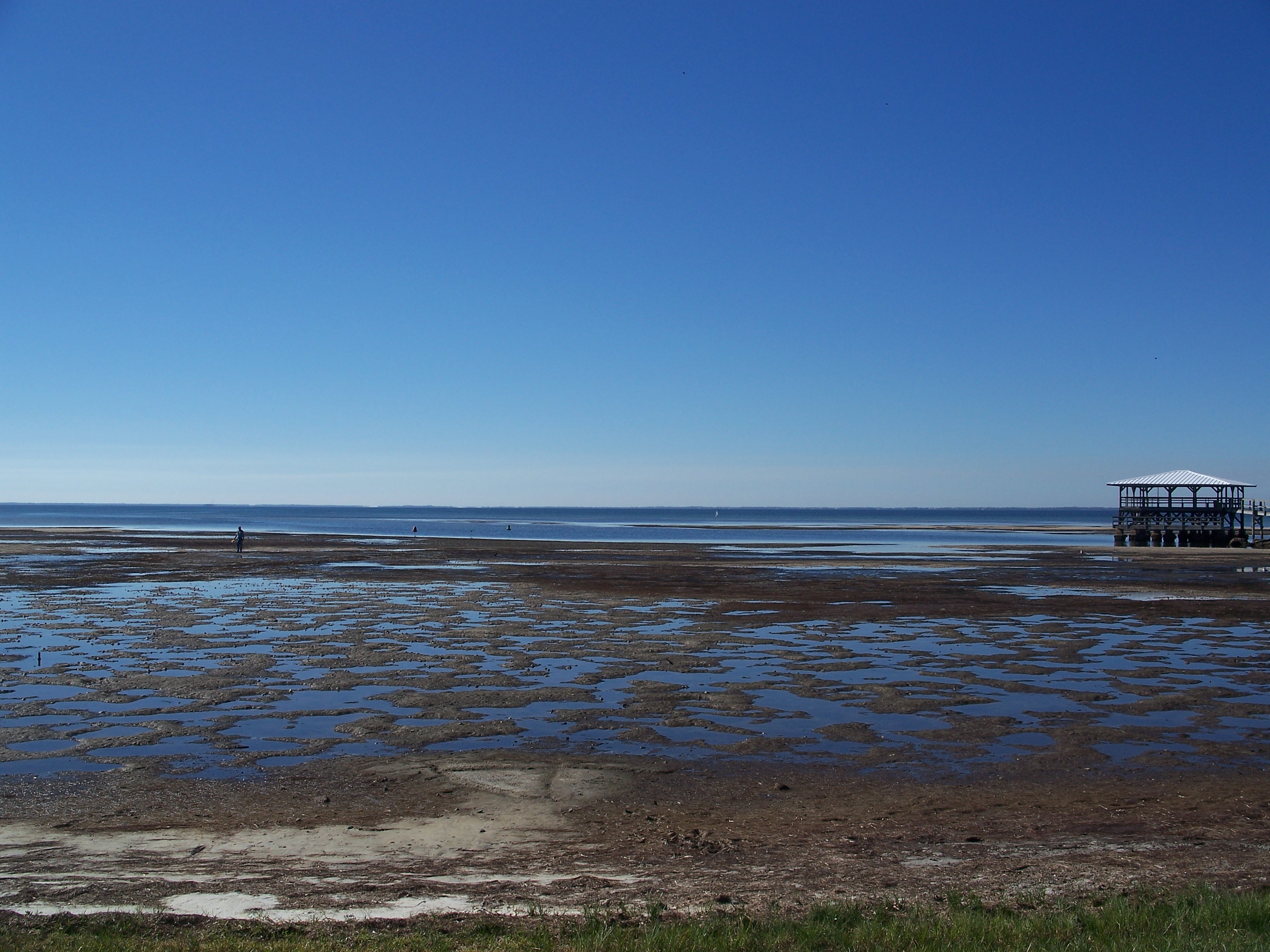
- Jack and Anne Rudloe coastal tour, St. Joseph Bay, AMM1539
- The Estuary of Panacea, Gulf Specimen Aquarium

== Biography ==
Jack Rudloe was born in Brooklyn, New York on February 17, 1943. At age 14, he moved to Carrabelle, Florida. His first work, "Experiments With Sensitive Plants, Cassia Nictitans", was published in Scientific American while he was attending Tallahassee's Leon High School. He later enrolled in Florida State University, but left after only two months. According to Rudloe's first book, The Sea Brings Forth, he was asked to leave FSU by the dean, who had decided Rudloe was not college material and advised that he should consider a trade instead. In spite of his premature departure from FSU, Rudloe was hired by marine biologist Dexter M. Easton of Harvard University to collect striped burrfish and bat fish. This launched his independent career as a writer and specimen collector. He was mentored in the early days by John Steinbeck. He founded Gulf Specimen Marine Company in 1963. In 1971, Rudloe married marine biologist Anne Rudloe, and together they founded Gulf Specimen Marine Laboratory in 1980. He has two sons, Sky and Cypress and a grandson Kai. He lives in Panacea, Florida and is semi-retired but still assists at GSML and he continues to write. He is the author/coauthor of nine books, both fiction and nonfiction.

== Scientific contributions ==
Rudloe has multiple acknowledgements from scientists about his personal contributions to and support of their research efforts in the marine science literature. Rudloe has also written numerous scientific articles, and technical publications himself. Rudloe was involved in early efforts to establish the now successful jellyfish export industry on the East Coast of the US. In 1968 he provided the first specimens of the bryozoan Bugula neritina used by the National Cancer Institute (NCI) to develop the bryostatin family of drugs used for treatment of cancer, HIV, Alzheimer's disease and strokes. He continues to work to find natural medicines from other sea organisms. Rudloe provides marine specimens to scientists worldwide, including some that were the first specimen known to science, such as Chiropsella rudloei. Rudloe has developed live culture techniques for food for captive animals otherwise considered difficult to raise in captivity including sea horses and the lesser electric ray (Narcine brasiliensis)

== Environmental activism ==
Rudloe is noted for two particular areas of effort in environmentalism. He was a strong proponent and advocate of turtle exclusion devices and his work is widely cited in efforts to introduce and later to enforce their use and his interest in general sea turtle welfare which were the subject of two of his books. Whenever a sea turtle rehabilitated at GSML is released back to the wild he is well known for arriving in sea blue suit which he wears into the water for the release. Working with his wife, he has also been credited with directly saving 35,000 acres of wetlands in the Florida Panhandle and the Florida Big Bend region through government lobbying appearances at public meetings and on television and radio broadcasts, about marine wetlands. He also wrote about shrimp and their contributions to the economy and to the environment. During the Deepwater Horizon oil spill Rudloe began a project to try to protect ocean invertebrates from contamination. He published numerous popular articles on environmental topics including several in Sports Illustrated, National Geographic and Audubon. Rudloe opposed Florida's commercial net fishing ban because he was concerned about the impact on small town fisheries and fishermen placing him at odds with many large environmental groups. He has been raising awareness of the issue of plastic and waste dumping into the ocean since at least 1992.

== Disputes ==
Rudloe began his career as an environmental activist at age 8 by biting the leg of a camp counsellor who was about to kill a turtle with a sledge hammer. His style of "high drama" and "lampooning" to promote environmental causes has not always endeared him to either the environmental movement or politicians. In 1972 Rudloe sued financier Edward Ball to try to force him to remove a fence across the Wakulla River, lost and was almost bankrupted by the resulting legal costs. A Wakulla News editorial called him "a nut" and "an extremist" in 1978. An owner of a local business has also called him "a nut". In 1988 he sued the Wakulla County Commissioner over alleged environmental damage caused by the building of a marina approved by the county and being built by the commissioner's brother. The county then resurrected a previously dropped legal battle from 1975 over his aquarium's water intake pipeline. While at a meeting over the marina, his boat was sunk and Rudloe was sued for slander when he claimed there was a connection. He was also arrested for cruelty to animals in the same period, a charge which was dismissed. In 1988 Rudloe organized a campaign to have people return their Exxon credit cards in a sealed bag of used motor oil to protest the Exxon Valdez's Prince William Sound oil spill.

There has been tension between members of the Florida State University Coastal and Marine Laboratory and Rudloe. Dr. Robert Livingstone of FSU publicly stated in 1988 that he takes care not to associate with Rudloe's fights. This tension reached a crescendo in 2002 with the publication of Alumni Notes by David M. Karl which included an account of persistent rumours at FSU that Rudloe had stolen a "priceless Neopilina specimen" which later appeared for sale in a Gulf Specimen Marine Laboratory catalogue and that this was the reason for Rudloe's departure from FSU in his first semester in 1962. Rudloe sued both Karl and FSU for slander. The case was initially dismissed by a local judge on the basis FSU had no liability but Rudloe appealed. After winning on appeal to The District Court of Appeal, State of Florida, the matter was later settled out of court. In 2015 FSU Coastal and Marine Lab donated giant sea roaches and hagfish to a "very grateful" Gulf Specimen Marine Lab to use in their aquarium for educating the public indicating the tension is resolved.

Rudloe submitted an article to Sports Illustrated describing how an alligator attacked and ate his dog in 1981. The editor sent a copy to Dr. F Wayne King, Professor and curator of the University of Florida's Florida Museum of Natural History in Gainesville who returned a marked up copy of the article with numerous objections taking particular exception to three items. Rudloe described the alligator as rearing to an upright position with front arms apart and fingers spread, he described vapour from the alligator's nostrils and how the alligator puffed up when Rudloe leaped on it and wrestled it in a vain attempt to save the dog. Based on the review, the editor excoriated Rudloe as a fraud and Rudloe did not write for Sports Illustrated again. Alligators have been observed to rise up and balance on their hind legs as part of a forward or upward lunge. King himself later published that it is possible to observe vapour from an alligator's nostrils and for them to puff up (although in the context of bellowing). There are also observations of alligators puffing up when aggressive. Rudloe eventually published the account in Audubon (1982) and Reader's Digest (1983).

In August 2016, Rudloe was removed by security for refusing to yield the microphone in a meeting of the Wakulla County, Florida Commissioners when they voted to adjourn instead of voting on a resolution opposing the permit for Foley Cellulose Mill's effluent pipeline extension project.

== Awards ==
- 2015 Environmental Hero in Joel Sartore's National Geographic Photo Ark Exhibit Nov 4, 2015
- 2014 Education and Outreach Environmental Law Institute National Wetlands Award (with Anne Rudloe and Gulf Specimen Marine Laboratory)
- 2004 ChevronTexaco Conservation Award (with Anne Rudloe and Gulf Specimen Marine Laboratory)
- 2003 Gulf Guardian Award Winners (3rd) (with Anne Rudloe and Gulf Specimen Marine Laboratory)
- 2003 Governor's Community Investment Award, Partners in Prevention (with Gulf Specimen Marine Laboratory)

== Selected works ==
- Shrimp, The Endless Quest for Pink Gold (with Anne Rudloe, 2010)
- Chicken Wars (with Anne Rudloe, 2005)
- Potluck (fiction, 2003)
- Search for the Great Turtle Mother (1995)
- The Wilderness Coast (1988)
- Time of the Turtle (1979)
- The Living Dock at Panacea (1977)
- The Erotic Ocean, A Handbook for Beachcombers and Marine Naturalists (1971)
- The Sea brings Forth (1968)
- Sea Turtles in a race for survival National Geographic Vol 185, No2 February 1994 (with Anne Rudloe)
- From the Jaws of Death, Canaveral Sea Turtles and the Corps of Engineers. Sports Illustrated, Vol. 54, No. 13:60-70. March 23, 1981
