= Ronald C. Phillips =

Ronald Carl Phillips
- Professor Ron Phillips in 2005
- Born: 4 June 1932; Carbondale, Illinois, US
- Died: 1 November 2005 (aged 73); Sevastopol
- Education: Wheaton College (Illinois) (BSc); Florida State University (MSc); University of Washington (PhD)
- Occupations: Marine botanist, SCUBA diver, underwater photographer, educator
- Spouse(s): Sylvia E. Anderson (1954-1983); Nataliya A. Milchakova (2003-2005)
- Children: 3 children and 1 stepson

Ronald Carl Phillips (1932–2005) was an American marine botanist and educator in the United States, Netherlands and Ukraine. He specialized in seagrass biology, ecology, systematics, distribution and transplantation. Prof. Phillips was the first individual to combine scuba-diving with seagrass research and transplantation. He co-edited or co-authored four scientific books, 20 book chapters, 20 technical reports and 3 monographs, over 70 reviewed papers, plus his autobiography which included the development of seagrass biology and restorative seagrass transplantation as important parts of the environmental sciences.

== Early years and education ==
Ron was born in 1932 to father Claude Phillips, a former geography teacher, and mother Cleo Belle (née Felts) in Carbondale, Illinois. They moved to Sheffield Avenue in Chicago with younger sister Pat in late 1933, then the family moved to Lombard, Illinois in 1938.

Ron took several biology courses from 10 years old at the Chicago Field Museum of Natural History. Ron graduated from York Community High School in 1950, and he graduated from Wheaton College (Illinois) in Biology in 1954. He worked with Chester S. Nielsen PhD on algal classification for the cryptogamic herbarium at the Field Museum in 1955.

After completing his master's degree in Botany in 1956 at Florida State University, he moved with his family to Seattle, Washington and taught general biology, vascular plant taxonomy and marine biology at Seattle Pacific College (changed to Seattle Pacific University in 1968). In addition to Phillips’s teaching career, he worked during the summers at Friday Harbor Laboratory, San Juan Islands near Seattle, Washington. He was granted a large National Science Foundation Fellowship in 1969 to complete his PhD thesis on Zostera in 1972.

== Seagrass career ==
From 1957 Phillips began scuba-diving as an integral part of his scientific field research into seagrasses. In 1959 he worked for Bob Ingle, the Director of the Florida State Board of Conservation Marine Lab, on projects involving the first recorded experimental seagrass transplants in order to restore habitats at dredged sites. In 1973, marine botanist and seagrass taxonomist Cornelius den Hartog invited Prof. Phillips to join the first International Seagrass Workshop in Leiden, Netherlands along with many international seagrass experts with whom he worked throughout his career. His scientific travels took him to 35 countries (Netherlands, France, Mexico, Australia, New Zealand, Japan, China and Taiwan, Philippines, United Kingdom, Israel and Egypt, the Soviet Union, Palau) and many places around South America and the Persian Gulf. His domestic travels included Alaska, Hawaii, Guam and every state except Delaware and Vermont.

He was a key speaker in many international Symposiums, conferences and meetings, and he was involved in the creation of several Natural and Biosphere Reserves.

== Sports ==
Ron had many varied sports interests and played on school teams for golf, baseball, basketball and marksmanship during secondary school and at Wheaton College (Illinois). He was a motorcycle enthusiast and raced motorcycles until 1998. He began skydiving in the early 1990s. He won various marksmanship and skeet shooting competitions throughout his life. He took more than 5000 photographs around the world, including many underwater pictures.

== Personal life ==
He married Sylvia Anderson of Blue Island, Illinois in late 1954 and had one son and two daughters; they divorced in 1983. He later married seagrass research colleague Nataliya A. Milchakova PhD (Sevastopol) in early 2003. Prof. Phillips was a lifelong Christian and attended various evangelical churches throughout his career.

== Awards ==
- Phipps-Bird Award. Best research paper of 1960 published in the Quarterly Journal of the Florida Academy of Science, 1961 (“Seasonal Aspect of the Marine Algal Flora of St. Lucie Inlet and Adjacent Indian River, Florida”, Vol. 24, No. 2, June, 1961 pp. 135-147, SEASONAL ASPECT OF THE MARINE ALGAL FLORA OF ST. LUCIE INLET AND ADJACENT INDIAN RIVER, FLORIDA).
- Burlington Northern Foundation. Scholar of the Year Award. Seattle Pacific University, 1985.
- US National Academy of Sciences. US-East European Exchange Program with the Soviet Union. Seagrass study, 1989.

== See also ==
- List of marine biologists
- Underwater photography
