= Cuvillier Verlag =

Germany-based publisher

- Status: Sole proprietorship
- Founded: 1989; 36 years ago
- Country of origin: Germany
- Headquarters location: Göttingen
- Distribution: Worldwide
- Publication types: Books, scientific papers and e-books
- Nonfiction topics: Scientific and business publications, including science, arts, and engineering
- Owner(s): Annette Jentzsch-Cuvillier
- Official website: www.cuvillier.de

Cuvillier Verlag is a German-based international publisher of dissertations, habilitation, scientific monographs, and brochures. There are also congress proceedings, special research reports, anthologies, commemorative publications, project reports, series of publications, brochures and e-platforms for organizations or other publications.

== History ==
It was founded in 1989 in Göttingen by Eric Cuvillier and Annette Jentzsch-Cuvillier. The publisher exports more than 7,100 titles (as of January 2016) in science and business. The spectrum of scientific publications includes all faculties of science, arts, and engineering. It is a family business, run by Annette Jentzsch-Cuvillier.

== Publishing program ==
The more than 7,100 published titles are made available both in print and as e-books.

The main subject areas of the company are:

- Agriculture and agricultural sciences
- Chemistry
- Physics
- Economics
- Mechanical engineering and process engineering
- Electrical engineering
- Law Sciences

== Cuvillier E-Collection ==
The company's e-book platform Cuvillier E-Collection publishes current research.
