= Bryostatin =

Bryostatin 1

Names
- IUPAC name (1S,3S,5Z,7R,8E,11S,12S,13E,15S,17R,20R,23R,25S)-25-Acetoxy-1,11,20-trihydroxy-17-[(1R)-1-hydroxyethyl]-5,13-bis(2-methoxy-2-oxoethylidene)-10,10,26,26-tetramethyl-19-oxo-18,27,28,29-tetraoxatetracyclo[21.3.1.1^{3,7}.1^{11,15}]nonacos-8-en-12-yl (2E,4E)-2,4-octadienoate

Identifiers
CAS Number	1: 83314-01-6
3D model (JSmol)	1: Interactive image
ChEBI	1: CHEBI:88353
ChEMBL	1: ChEMBL449158
ChemSpider	1: 27022418
DrugBank	1: DB11752
KEGG	1: C05149
PubChem CID	1: 5280757
UNII	1: 37O2X55Y9E
- InChI: InChI=1S/C47H68O17/c1-10-11-12-13-14-15-39(51)62-42-31(24-41(53)58-9)23-34-25-37(28(2)48)61-43(54)36(50)17-16-33-26-38(59-29(3)49)45(6,7)46(55,63-33)27-35-21-30(22-40(52)57-8)20-32(60-35)18-19-44(4,5)47(42,56)64-34/h12-15,18-19,22,24,28,32-38,42,48,50,55-56H,10-11,16-17,20-21,23,25-27H2,1-9H3/b13-12+,15-14+,19-18+,30-22+,31-24+/t28-,32+,33-,34+,35+,36-,37-,38+,42+,46+,47-/m1/s1 Key: XYXASLYZTKBYQJ-OAUMSBLFSA-N; 1: InChI=1/C47H68O17/c1-10-11-12-13-14-15-39(51)62-42-31(24-41(53)58-9)23-34-25-37(28(2)48)61-43(54)36(50)17-16-33-26-38(59-29(3)49)45(6,7)46(55,63-33)27-35-21-30(22-40(52)57-8)20-32(60-35)18-19-44(4,5)47(42,56)64-34/h12-15,18-19,22,24,28,32-38,42,48,50,55-56H,10-11,16-17,20-21,23,25-27H2,1-9H3/b13-12+,15-14+,19-18+,30-22+,31-24+/t28-,32+,33-,34+,35+,36-,37-,38+,42+,46+,47-/m1/s1 Key: XYXASLYZTKBYQJ-OAUMSBLFBY
- SMILES: 1: CCC/C=C/C=C/C(=O)O[C@H]1/C(=C/C(=O)OC)/C[C@H]2C[C@@H](OC(=O)[C@@H](CC[C@@H]3C[C@@H](C([C@@](O3)(C[C@@H]4C/C(=C/C(=O)OC)/C[C@@H](O4)/C=C/C([C@@]1(O2)O)(C)C)O)(C)C)OC(=O)C)O)[C@@H](C)O

Properties
Chemical formula	C_{47}H_{68}O_{17}
Molar mass	905.044 g·mol^{−1}
- Except where otherwise noted, data are given for materials in their standard state (at 25 °C [77 °F], 100 kPa). Infobox references

Bryostatins are a group of macrolide lactones from (bacterial symbionts of) the marine organism Bugula neritina that were first collected and provided to JL Hartwell’s anticancer drug discovery group at the National Cancer Institute (NCI) by Jack Rudloe. Bryostatins are potent modulators of protein kinase C. They have been studied in clinical trials as anti-cancer agents, as anti-AIDS/HIV agents and in people with Alzheimer's disease.

== Biological effects ==
Bryostatin 1 is a potent modulator of protein kinase C (PKC).

It showed activity in laboratory tests in cells and model animals, so it was brought into clinical trials. As of 2014 over thirty clinical trials had been conducted, using bryostatin alone and in combination with other agents, in both solid tumors and blood tumors; it did not show a good enough risk:benefit ratio to be advanced further.

It showed enough promise in animal models of Alzheimer's disease that a Phase II trial was started by 2010; the trial was sponsored by the Blanchette Rockefeller Neurosciences Institute. Scientists from that institute started a company called Neurotrope, and launched another clinical trial in Alzheimer's disease, preliminary results of which were released in 2017.

Bryostatin has also been studied in people with HIV. Mitzi Nagarkatti's research indicates that Bryostatin works as a latent infection-reversing agent in HIV-infected patients.

== Chemistry ==
Bryostatin 1 was first isolated in the 1960s by George Pettit from extracts of a species of bryozoan, Bugula neritina, based on research from samples originally provided by Jack Rudloe to Jonathan L. Hartwell’s anticancer drug discovery group at the National Cancer Institute (NCI). The structure of bryostatin 1 was determined in 1982. As of 2010 20 different bryostatins had been isolated.

The low concentration in bryozoans (to extract one gram of bryostatin, roughly one tonne of the raw bryozoans is needed) makes extraction unviable for large scale production. Due to the structural complexity, total synthesis has proved difficult, with only a few total syntheses reported so far. Total syntheses have been published for bryostatins 1, 2, 3, 7, 9 and 16. Among them, Wender’s total synthesis of bryostatin 1 is the shortest synthesis of any bryostatin reported, to date.

A number of structurally simpler synthetic analogs also have been prepared which exhibit similar biological profile and in some cases greater potency, which may provide a practical supply for clinical use.

== Biosynthesis ==
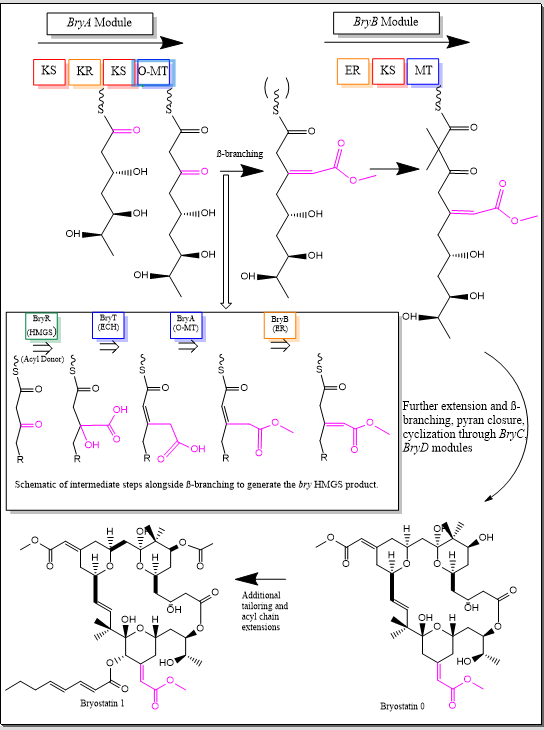
B. Neritina biosynthetic pathway for bryostatins.

In B. Neritina, bryostatin biosynthesis is carried out through a type I polyketide synthase cluster, bry. BryR is the secondary metabolism homolog of HMG-CoA synthase, which is the PKS in bacterial primary metabolism. In the bryostatin pathway, the BryR module catalyzes β-Branching between a local acetoacetyl acceptor acyl carrier protein (ACP-a) and an appropriate donor BryU acetyl-ACP (ACP-d).

The first step involves the loading of a malonyl unit onto a discrete BryU ACP-d within an initial BryA module. The extended BryU product in BryA is then loaded onto a cysteine sidechain of BryR for interaction with ACP-a. Upon interaction, BryR then catalyzes β-Branching, facilitating an aldol reaction between the alpha-carbon of the BryU unit and the β-ketone of ACP-a, yielding a product similar to HMGS products in primary metabolism. After β-Branching, subsequent dehydration by a BryT enoyl-CoA hydratase homolog (ECH), as well as BryA O-methylation and BryB double bond isomerization of the generated HMGS product, are carried out in specific domains of the bry cluster. These post-β-Branching steps generate the vinyl methylester moieties which are found in all natural product bryostatins. Finally, BryC and BryD are responsible for further extension, pyran ring closure, and cyclization of the HMGS product to produce the novel bryostatin product.

In the presence of BryR, ACP-d conversion to holo-ACP-d was observed prior to β-Branching. BryR was shown to have high specificity for ACP-d only after this conversion. Specificity for these protein-bound groups is a feature that differentiates the HMGS homologs found in primary metabolism, where HMGS typically acts on substrates linked to Coenzyme A, from those found in non-ribosomal peptide synthase (NRPS) or PKS pathways such as the bryostatin pathway.
