= María Elena Caso =

Mexican marine biologist

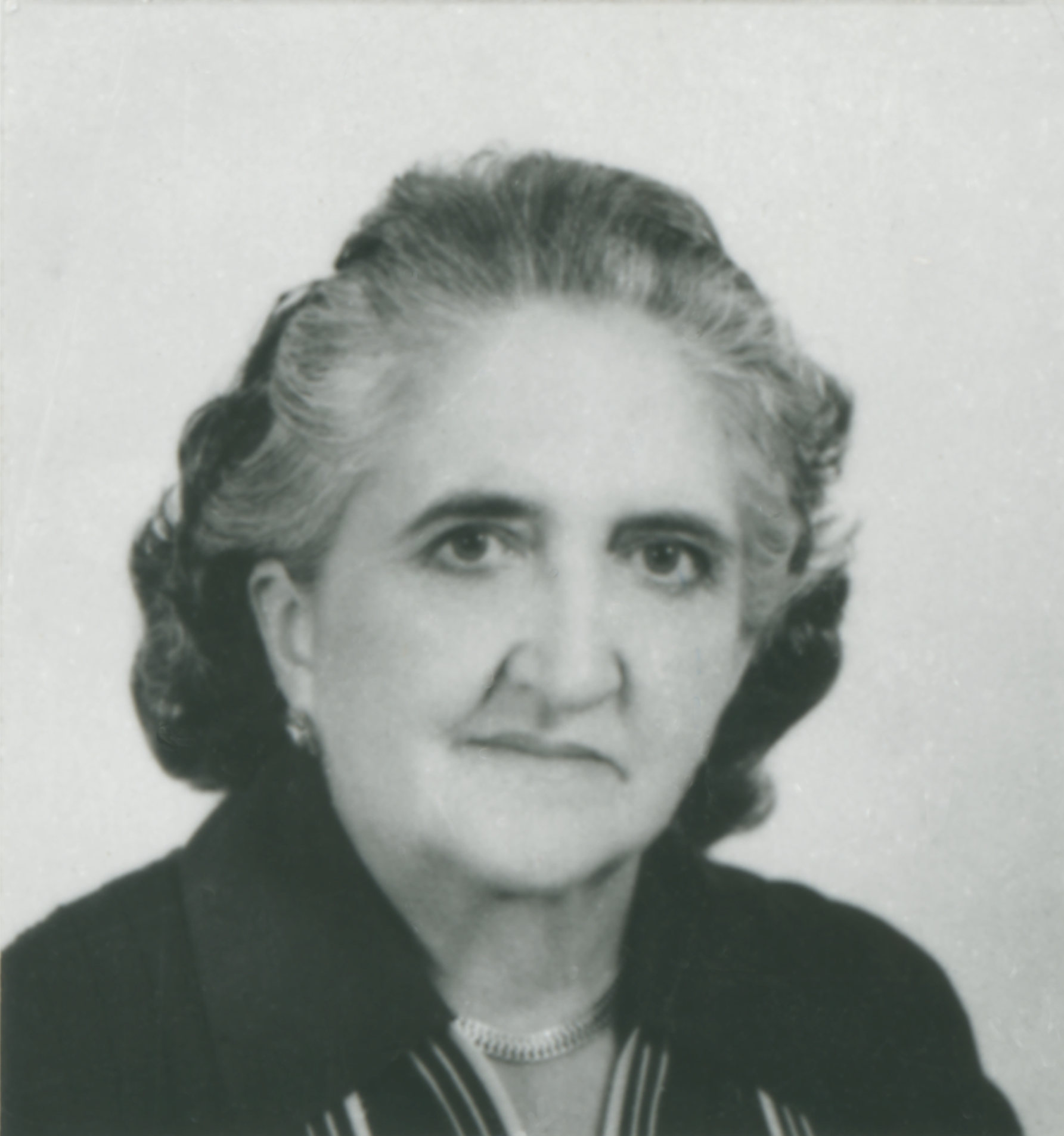
- Born: 18-12-1915; Mexico
- Died: 6-11-1991
- Education: National Autonomous University of Mexico, Mexico
- Known for: Pioneer in the study of equinoderms such as starfish in Mexico

María Elena Caso (18 December 1915 – 6 November 1991, Mexico) was a Mexican biologist who pioneered the study of starfish and other echinoderms in Mexico. She started the National Collection of Equinoderms in Mexico, the most important one in Latin America, which currently has at least 100.000 samples from 800 species from the Mexican coast and participated in the foundation of the laboratory of hydrobiology of the Biology Institute at the National Autonomous University of Mexico, currently known as "Marine Sciences and Limnology Institute". She became a reference scientist in marine biodiversity.

== Early life and scientific career ==
María Elena Caso was born in Mexico City (Mexico) in a family of well-known people: her father was the philosopher Antonio Caso Andrade, rector of the former Universidad Nacional de México. Her brother was the archeologist Alfonso Caso. During her childhood she also spent time with relevant Mexican personalities such as José Vasconcelos and Alfonso Reyes.

She studied Biological Sciences in the National Autonomous University of Mexico, where she also completed an MSc degree and received the honorific mention for her thesis in 1943 after reporting the existence of a new species in Mexico, Linckia guildingii.

Together with the Spanish professor Enrique Rioja Lobianco, who arrived in Mexico due to exile during the Spanish Civil War, she co-founded the laboratory of hydrobiology of the Biology Institute at the National Autonomous University of Mexico.

In 1961, María Elena completes her PhD thesis.

She visited both the Atlantic and Pacific Mexican coast in search of echinoderms in the harsh conditions of her times and spent more than 50 years of her life to the study of these animals.

== Contributions and acknowledgements ==
María Elena Caso hold several professor and researcher positions at the National Autonomous University of Mexico during her career.

She described 17 new taxa related with equinoderms and published numerous works.

The species of spider crab Podochela Casoae was named after her.
