= Swiss Cancer League =

Bern based Association on Cancer Pretension

- Formation: 1910
- Type: Non Profit Organization; Association under Swiss Law
- Purpose: Cancer Prevention
- Headquarters: Bern
- Website: www.liguecancer.ch

Swiss Cancer League is a Swiss association of public utility committed against cancer. It is known for its advocacy and researches for cancer prevention and screening and providing support for affected people and their families. This organization offers advice, publishes documentation on specific topics in the relevant domain. It also offers training and continuing education for professionals. It is operational in 18 cantons across Switzerland and its headquarter is located at Bern, Switzerland.

== History ==
The Swiss Cancer League was founded in 1910 and its initial name was “Swiss Association to Fight Against Cancer”.

== Organization ==
The association is composed of collective members and the 18 cantonal and regional leagues. The representatives form these regional leagues form the supreme body, the assembly of delegates. The supreme body, currently composed of twelve members, provides strategic direction to the organization. Operational management is the responsibility of management, which has five members. It is made up of the director and the heads of the four sectors (Prevention, support and monitoring; Research, innovation and development; Marketing & communication and fundraising, Finance, personnel & services). As of 2018, it has participated in numerous projects with the aim of preventing cancer worth CHF 30 million.

The Swiss Cancer League is also involved in the development and implementation of measures to fight cancer in Switzerland as part of the “National Cancer Strategy”. Similar organizations are quite common in many European countries.

== Bibliography ==
- Daniel Kauz: From taboo to debate? One hundred years of cancer control in Switzerland 1910-2010. Attinger, Bern 2010. ISBN 978-2-940418-16-9.
- Markus Wieser: Zeitzeugen berichten. Die Krebsliga 1960–2009. Swiss Cancer League, Bern 2014.
- Carl Wegelin: History of the Swiss National League for Combating Cancer and Cancer Research, 1910–1958. Karger, Basel 1959.
- Bruno Markus Balsiger: Welfare and social work in the history of the Swiss Cancer League. Bern 1993 (dissertation).
