= Panacea, Florida =

- Census-Designated Place
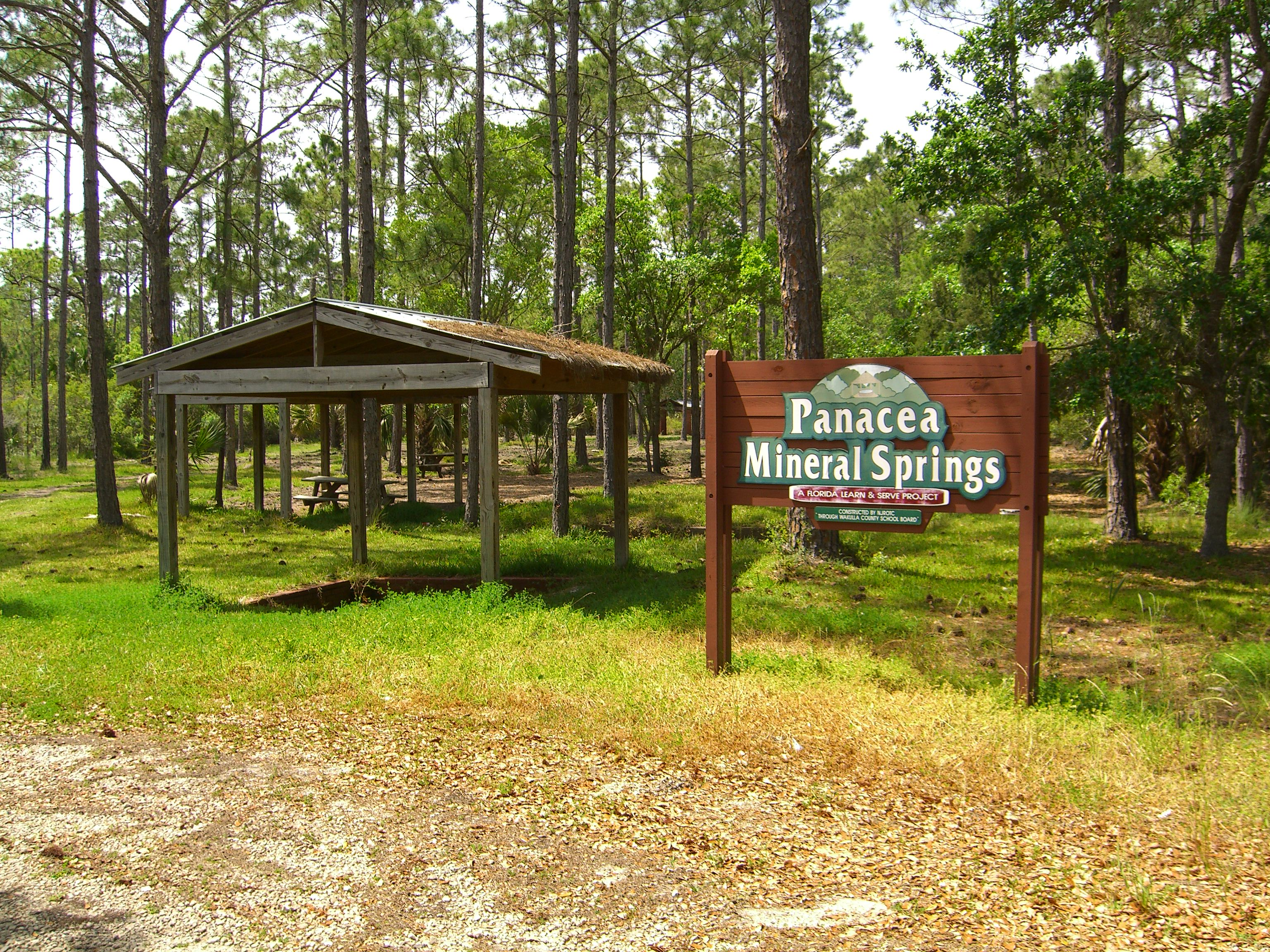

- Location in Wakulla County and the state of Florida.
- Coordinates: 30°01′42″N 84°23′37″W
- Country: United States
- State: Florida
- County: Wakulla
- Founded: 1895
- Elevation: 10 ft (3.0 m)

Population (2020)
  - Total: 735
- Time zone: UTC-5 (EST)
  - Summer (DST): UTC-4 (EDT)
- ZIP code: 32346
- Area code: 850
- GNIS feature ID: 2628528
- Website: www.visitpanacea.com

Panacea is an unincorporated community and census-designated place (CDP) in Wakulla County, Florida, United States. The population was 735 at the 2020 census, down from 816 at the 2010 census. It is part of the Tallahassee metropolitan area. The mule drawn and wooden railed Panacea Team brought tourists from Sopchoppy. It is home to the Gulf Specimen Marine Laboratory and its nature center.

== History ==
The community was known as Smith Springs until 1893 when some Bostonians purchased the land about the five springs here and renamed the town Panacea, after the goddess of universal remedy, because of the curative properties of the waters. During the Civil War a large plant here supplied salt for much of western Florida. Most of the development in the area was destroyed by a hurricane in 1928.

== Demographics ==
Panacea first appeared as a census designated place in the 2010 U.S. census.

=== 2020 census ===
Panacea racial composition (NH = Non-Hispanic) (Note: Note: the US Census treats Hispanic/Latino as an ethnic category. This table excludes Latinos from the racial categories and assigns them to a separate category. Hispanics/Latinos can be of any race.)
Race	Number	Percentage
White (NH)	695	94.56%
Black or African American (NH)	9	1.22%
Native American or Alaska Native (NH)	2	0.27%
Asian (NH)	1	0.14%
Some Other Race (NH)	1	0.14%
Mixed/Multi-Racial (NH)	22	2.99%
Hispanic or Latino	5	0.68%
Total	735	

As of the 2020 United States census, there were 735 people, 284 households, and 199 families residing in the CDP.

== Transportation ==
The Wakulla County Airport is located approximately 3 miles (4.8 km) south of Panacea. It is the only airport in Wakulla County.
